= List of songs recorded by Car Seat Headrest =

The following is a list of songs by Car Seat Headrest. Since 2010 Will Toledo has released 199 songs over 8 solo albums under the alias, 6 studio albums as a band, 5 EPs, and 2 outtakes compilations.

== Songs ==
Title	Year	Release	Writer(s)	Length	Ref.
"(Joe Gets Kicked Out of School for Using) Drugs With Friends (But Says This Isn't a Problem)"	2016	Teens of Denial	Will Toledo	5:37	
"(Joe Gets Kicked Out of School for Using) Drugs With Friends (But Says This Isn't a Problem)"	2026	Teen of Denial (Joe's Story)	Will Toledo	5:57	
"...Then It Will Be Exactly the Same as Earth"	2010	2	Will Toledo	2:53	
"100 Minutes of Solitude"	2010	Sunburned Shirts and Little Pieces Of Paper With "No" Written On Them	Will Toledo	2:20	
"1937 State Park"	2016	Teens of Denial	Will Toledo	4:00	
"1937 State Park"	2026	Teen of Denial (Joe's Story)	Will Toledo	4:03	
"2:24"	2013	Disjecta Membra	Will Toledo	2:57	
"90"	2010	2	Will Toledo	2:20	
"A Good Bridge to Never Cross Until There's No Doubt that He's Dead"	2010	4	Will Toledo	6:20	
"A Pleasant Sort of Terror"	2010	Little Pieces Of Paper With "No" Written On Them	Will Toledo	3:04	
"AC"	2013	Disjecta Membra	Will Toledo	2:48	
"Act Suspicious"	2010 / 2016	2 and Teens of Denial	Will Toledo	1:36 / 1:39	
"Afterglow"	2013	Nervous Young Man	Will Toledo	5:04	
"America (Never Been)"	2014	How to Leave Town	Will Toledo	7:15	
"Anchorite (Love You Very Much)"	2012	Monomania	Will Toledo	14:04	
"Around"	2010	4	Will Toledo	5:20	
"Bad Role Models, Old Idols Exhumed (psst, teenagers, put your clothes back o)"	2015	Teens of Style	Will Toledo	1:54	
"Beach Drugs"	2010	3	Will Toledo	4:00	
"Beach Fagz"	2010	3	Will Toledo	5:50	
"Beach Funeral"	2010	3	Will Toledo	4:48	
"Beach Life-in-Death"	2011	Twin Fantasy	Will Toledo	12:10	
"Beach Life-in-Death"	2018	Twin Fantasy (Face to Face)	Will Toledo	13:18	
"Beach Weak"	2010	3	Will Toledo	3:58	
"Beach Death"	2010	3	Will Toledo	4:00	
"Beast Monster Thing (Love Isn't Love Enough)"	2014	How to Leave Town	Will Toledo	6:52	
"Big Jacket"	2010 / 2013	1 and Nervous Young Man	Will Toledo	4:35 / 5:05	
"Bodys"	2011	Twin Fantasy	Will Toledo	6:15	
"Bodys"	2018	Twin Fantasy (Face to Face)	Will Toledo	6:46	
"Boxing Day"	2013	Nervous Young Man	Will Toledo	15:34	
"Broken Birds (Rest in Pieces)"	2013	Nervous Young Man	Will Toledo	8:21	
"Burning Man"	2013	Nervous Young Man	Will Toledo	5:32	
"Can't Cool Me Down"	2020	Making a Door Less Open	Will Toledo	5:09	
"CCF (I'm Gonna Stay With You)"	2025	The Scholars	Car Seat Headrest	8:11	
"Cesare the Somnambulist"	2010	1	Will Toledo	4:05	
"Connect the Dots (The Saga of Frank Sinatra)"	2016	Teens of Denial	Will Toledo	6:07	
"Connect the Dots (Song of Secretariat)"	2026	Teens of Denial (Joe's Story)	Will Toledo	6:04	
"Cosmic Hero"	2016	Teens of Denial	Will Toledo	8:31	
"Cosmic Hero"	2026	Teen of Denial (Joe's Story)	Will Toledo	8:30	
"Crows (Rest in Bigger Pieces Mix)"	2013	Nervous Young Man	Will Toledo	4:23	
"Culture"	2016	The Quad Dub	Will Toledo	3:55	
"Cute Thing"	2011	Twin Fantasy	Will Toledo, John Linnell, John Flansburgh	5:21	
"Cute Thing"	2018	Twin Fantasy (Face to Face)	Will Toledo, John Linnell, John Flansburgh	5:39	
"David Lynch Versus the Moon"	2010	1	Will Toledo	3:22	
"Deadlines (Hostile)"	2020	Making a Door Less Open	Will Toledo	5:51	
"Deadlines (Thoughtful)"	2020	Making a Door Less Open	Will Toledo	4:21	
"Death at the Movies"	2013	Nervous Young Man	Will Toledo	6:54	
"Destroyed by Hippie Powers"	2016	Teens of Denial	Will Toledo	5:03	
"Destroyed by Hippie Powers"	2026	Teen of Denial (Joe's Story)	Will Toledo	5:05	
"Devereaux"	2025	The Scholars	Car Seat Headrest	4:30	
"Devil Moon"	2012	Starving While Living	Will Toledo	3:27	
"Dickless Heart"	2010	4	Will Toledo	7:06	
"Don't Remind Me"	2013	Nervous Young Man	Will Toledo	4:45	
"Dream: Encounter on Smoke Mountain"	2013	Disjecta Membra	Will Toledo	10:00	
"Dreams Fall Hard"	2013	Nervous Young Man	Will Toledo	6:30	
"Drunk Drivers/Killer Whales"	2016	Teens of Denial	Will Toledo	6:14	
"Drunk Drivers/Killer Whales"	2026	Teen of Denial (Joe's Story)	Will Toledo	6:28	
"Drunk on a Work Night"	2013	Disjecta Membra	Will Toledo	1:20	
"Endpiece"	2013	Disjecta Membra	Will Toledo	0:42	
"Equals"	2025	The Scholars	Car Seat Headrest	4:11	
"Even the Who Knows"	2010	4	Will Toledo	3:22	
"Famous"	2020	Making a Door Less Open	Will Toledo	2:44	
"Famous Prophets (Minds)"	2011	Twin Fantasy	Will Toledo	10:20	
"Famous Prophets (Stars)"	2018	Twin Fantasy (Face to Face)	Will Toledo	16:10	
"Father, Flesh in Rags"	2010 / 2011	Sunburned Shirts and My Back is Killing Me Baby	Will Toledo	4:58	
"Feel like Daniel Johnston"	2010	4	Will Toledo	4:12	
"ff"	2010	Little Pieces Of Paper With "No" Written On Them	Will Toledo	3:47	
"Fiction I"	2010	2	Will Toledo	3:49	
"Fill in the Blank"	2016	Teens of Denial	Will Toledo	4:04	
"Fill in the Blank"	2026	Teen of Denial (Joe's Story)	Will Toledo	4:11	
"Foreign Song"	2010	3	Will Toledo	4:20	
"Get Better Song Titles Punk" "Get Better Get Well"	2010	Sunburned Shirts and Little Pieces Of Paper With "No" Written On Them	Will Toledo	3:37	
"Gethsemane"	2025	The Scholars	Car Seat Headrest	10:51	
"Golden Years"	2021	MADLO: Influences	David Bowie	4:34	
"Good Sunday"	2010	1	Will Toledo	4:07	
"Goodbye Love"	2013	Nervous Young Man	Will Toledo	1:48	
"Hanging Out With My Mom in Woman's Apparel"	2010	2	Will Toledo	3:06	
"Happy News for Sadness"	2011	My Back is Killing Me Baby	Will Toledo	4:57	
"Happy/Ugly"	2010	1	Will Toledo	2:56	
"Heartless Dick"	2010	4	Will Toledo	1:23	
"Hey, Space Cadet (Beast Monster Thing in Space)"	2014	How to Leave Town	Will Toledo	11:26	
"Hi Life"	2013	Disjecta Membra	Will Toledo	4:02	
"High to Death"	2011	Twin Fantasy	Will Toledo	5:36	
"High to Death"	2018	Twin Fantasy (Face to Face)	Will Toledo	7:39	
"His Shiny Customers"	2010	1	Will Toledo	2:37	
"Hollywood"	2020	Making a Door Less Open	Will Toledo, Andrew Katz	3:22	
"Homes"	2013	Nervous Young Man	Will Toledo	6:30	
"Hymn (Remix)"	2020	Making a Door Less Open	Will Toledo	2:48	
"I Am Afraid of Literally Everything"	2010	Little Pieces Of Paper With "No" Written On Them	Will Toledo	1:31	
"I Can Play the Piano"	2013	Nervous Young Man	Will Toledo	5:19	
"I CAN TALK WITH MY EYES SHUT"	2010	Little Pieces Of Paper With "No" Written On Them	Will Toledo	7:36	
"I Don't Want You"	2010	Little Pieces Of Paper With "No" Written On Them	Will Toledo	3:22	
"I Hate Living"	2012	Starving While Living	Will Toledo	5:10	
"I Scream Social"	2010	Little Pieces Of Paper With "No" Written On Them	Will Toledo	1:48	
"I Wanna Sweat"	2013	Nervous Young Man	Will Toledo	5:51	
"I Want You to Know That I'm Awake/I Hope That You're Asleep"	2014	How to Leave Town	Will Toledo	8:43	
"I-94 W (832 mi)"	2014	How to Leave Town	Will Toledo	1:26	
"If Not, Then Oh Well"	2013	Disjecta Membra	Will Toledo	5:57	
"Inside the Bell Jar"	2010	1	Will Toledo	2:15	
"Is This Dust Really From the Titanic?"	2014	How to Leave Town	Will Toledo	1:57	
"It's My Child (I'll Do What I Like)"	2023	Faces from the Masquerade	Ethan Ives	6:07	
"It's Only Sex"	2012	Starving While Living	Will Toledo	4:43	
"Its You, You're the Asshole that Made This"	2010	2	Will Toledo	2:50	
"Ivy"	2019	Commit Yourself Completely	Christopher Breaux, Malay	5:11	
"Jerks"	2013	Nervous Young Man	Will Toledo	5:30	
"Joe Drives Again"	2026	Teen of Denial (Joe's Story)	Will Toledo	4:09	
"Joe Goes to School"	2016	Teens of Denial	Will Toledo	1:17	
"Joe Goes to School"	2026	Teen of Denial (Joe's Story)	Will Toledo	1:20	
"July New Hey"	2010	1	Will Toledo	2:41	
"Jus' Tired"	2013	Nervous Young Man	Will Toledo	5:26	
"Just What I Needed"	2016	Teens of Denial	Will Toledo		
"Kid War"	2010	1	Will Toledo	5:09	
"Kimochi Warui (When? When? When? When? When? When? When?)"	2014	How to Leave Town	Will Toledo	4:44	
"Knife in the Coffee"	2013	Nervous Young Man	Will Toledo, Joe Chambers, Willie Chambers	4:25	
"KS"	2013	Disjecta Membra	Will Toledo	6:36	
"Lady Gay Approximately"	2025	The Scholars	Car Seat Headrest	3:47	
"Lawns"	2011	My Back is Killing Me Baby	Will Toledo	3:46	
"Leave Together"	2010	Little Pieces Of Paper With "No" Written On Them	Will Toledo	2:39	
"Life Worth Missing"	2020	Making a Door Less Open	Will Toledo	4:53	
"Los Borrachos (I Don't Have Any Hope Left, But the Weather is Nice)"	2012	Monomania and Teens of Style	Will Toledo	6:06 / 6:23	
"Love Me Too Much"	2013	Disjecta Membra	Will Toledo	3:28	
"March of the Pigs"	2021	MADLO: Influences	Trent Reznor	2:46	
"Martin"	2020	Making a Door Less Open	Will Toledo	3:27	
"Maud Gone"	2012	Monomania and Teens of Style	Will Toledo	5:36 / 5:58	
"Memories"	2013	Disjecta Membra	Will Toledo	5:32	
"Misheard Lyrics" (featuring Nora Knight)	2012	Monomania	Will Toledo	5:38	
"Mortgages for Veterans"	2010	1	Will Toledo	5:47	
"My Boy (Twin Fantasy)"	2011	Twin Fantasy	Will Toledo	2:49	
"My Boy (Twin Fantasy)"	2011	Twin Fantasy (Face to Face)	Will Toledo	2:52	
"My Dad Just Passed Out"	2010	3	Will Toledo	2:24	
"Napoleon (March Into Russia)"	2013	Disjecta Membra	Will Toledo	6:07	
"Neon Sign"	2010	Little Pieces Of Paper With "No" Written On Them	Will Toledo	3:09	
"Nervous Young Inhumans"	2011	Twin Fantasy	Will Toledo	4:14	
"Nervous Young Inhumans"	2018	Twin Fantasy (Face to Face)	Will Toledo	5:25	
"No Passion"	2011	My Back is Killing Me Baby and Teens of Style	Will Toledo	2:56 / 2:50	
"No Starving"	2010	3	Will Toledo	2:51	
"Not 'Kidding' Around"	2010	4	Will Toledo	5:55	
"Not What I Needed"	2016	Teens of Denial	Will Toledo	4:31	
"Oh! Starving"	2010 / 2012	3, Starving While Living, and Teens of Style	Will Toledo	3:10 / 3:53 / 3:51	
"Open-Mouthed Boy"	2011	My Back is Killing Me Baby	Will Toledo	2:59	
"Optimistic Son"	2026	Teen of Denial (Joe's Story)	Will Toledo	3:39	
"Overexposed (Enjoy)"	2012	Monomania	Will Toledo	4:33	
"P.O.W."	2010 / 2011	Sunburned Shirts and My Back is Killing Me Baby	Will Toledo	5:10	
"Plane Crash Blues (I Can't Play the Piano)"	2013	Nervous Young Man	Will Toledo	5:43	
"Planet Desperation"	2025	The Scholars	Car Seat Headrest	18:52	
"Please Mr Pilot"	2013	Disjecta Membra	Will Toledo	3:13	
"Portrait of the Artist as a Young Fag"	2010	3	Will Toledo	3:51	
"psst, teenagers, take off your clo"	2010 / 2015	3 and Teens of Style	Will Toledo	1:02 / 1:00	
"Reality"	2025	The Scholars	Car Seat Headrest	8:59	
"Reuse the Cels"	2012	Starving While Living	Will Toledo	4:41	
"Reversible Jacket"	2010	2	Will Toledo	2:50	
"Romantic Theory"	2012	Monomania	Will Toledo	3:42	
"Running Up That Hill"	2021	MADLO: Influences	Kate Bush	6:30	
"Ryan North by Northwest"	2010	3	Will Toledo	4:06	
"Samson's Golden Axe"	2010	Little Pieces Of Paper With "No" Written On Them	Will Toledo	1:43	
"Shoelaces"	2010	2	Will Toledo	3:10	
"Sinner"	2013	Disjecta Membra	Will Toledo	5:28	
"Sleeping With Strangers"	2012	Monomania	Will Toledo	5:17	
"Smokezone"	2010	2	Will Toledo	3:16	
"Sober to Death"	2011	Twin Fantasy	Will Toledo	5:03	
"Sober to Death"	2018	Twin Fantasy (Face to Face)	Will Toledo	5:04	
"Some Strange Angel"	2013	Nervous Young Man	Will Toledo	5:48	
"Something Soon"	2011	My Back is Killing Me Baby and Teens of Style	Will Toledo	4:22 / 4:20	
"Souls"	2012	Monomania	Will Toledo	9:42	
"Sound Man / Low Fidelity"	2013	Disjecta Membra	Will Toledo	5:12	
"Squid Desert"	2010	Little Pieces Of Paper With "No" Written On Them	Will Toledo	3:23	
"Stoop Kid"	2011	My Back is Killing Me Baby	Will Toledo	4:28	
"Stop Smoking"	2011	Twin Fantasy	Will Toledo	1:27	
"Stop Smoking (We Love You)"	2018	Twin Fantasy (Face to Face)	Will Toledo	1:29	
"Strangers"	2011	My Back is Killing Me Baby and Teens of Style	Will Toledo	5:52 / 5:39	
"Substitute"	2021	MADLO: Influences	Pete Townshend	3:47	
"Summer Bummer"	2010	3	Will Toledo	2:26	
"Sun Hot"	2010	3	Will Toledo	2:10	
"Sunburned Shirts"	2010 / 2011	Sunburned Shirts, My Back is Killing Me Baby, and Teens of Style	Will Toledo	3:48 / 4:05	
"Surf Jerk"	2010	Little Pieces Of Paper With "No" Written On Them	Will Toledo	2:32	
"The Ballad of the Costa Concordia"	2016	Teens of Denial	Will Toledo	11:30	
"The Catastrophe (Good Luck With That, Man"	2025	The Scholars	Car Seat Headrest	5:28	
"The Drum"	2011	My Back is Killing Me Baby and Teens of Style	Will Toledo	3:53 / 3:57	
"The Ending of Dramamine"	2014	How to Leave Town	Will Toledo	14:17	
"The Ghost of Bob Saget"	2010	4	Will Toledo	6:56	
"The Gun Song" "The Gun Song - No Trigger Version"	2013	Nervous Young Man	Will Toledo, Neil Young	16:05 / 15:16	
"The Hard Part"	2013	Disjecta Membra	Will Toledo	3:36	
"The Majestic Hotel"	2010	2	Will Toledo	2:12	
"The Move"	2016	Teens of Denial	Will Toledo	5:50	
"The Ravenous House"^{A}	2026	Teens of Denial (Joe's Story)	Will Toledo	11:32	
"The Singles Song"	2010	Little Pieces Of Paper With "No" Written On Them	Will Toledo	2:00	
"The Staying Song"	2010	Little Pieces Of Paper With "No" Written On Them	Will Toledo	5:38	
"The Vice President of Google and Et Al"	2010	Little Pieces Of Paper With "No" Written On Them	Will Toledo	3:29	
"There Must Be More Than Blood"	2020	Making a Door Less Open	Will Toledo	7:33	
"This One Time I Went to a Coffee House Because Some Guy I Knew Was Playing and I Just Sat There for an Hour and Didn't Talk to Anyone and Then I Came Home and Wrote This Song"	2010	2	Will Toledo	2:18	
"Times to Die"	2012	Monomania and Teens of Style	Will Toledo	6:40 / 6:50	
"Total Burn"	2010	Little Pieces Of Paper With "No" Written On Them	Will Toledo	2:24	
"True/False Lover"	2025	The Scholars	Car Seat Headrest	3:28	
"Twin Fantasy (Those Boys)"	2011	Twin Fantasy	Will Toledo	6:28	
"Twin Fantasy (Those Boys)"	2018	Twin Fantasy (Face to Face)	Will Toledo	6:28	
"Tybee Island Horse Ghosts"	2010	1	Will Toledo	4:55	
"Unfinished: Pain Star (If Heaven Is Full of People...)"	2013	Disjecta Membra	Will Toledo	4:39	
"Unforgiving Girl (She's Not An)"	2016	Teens of Denial	Will Toledo	5:26	
"Up All Night"	2010	1	Will Toledo	2:59	
"Vincent"	2016	Teens of Denial	Will Toledo	7:45	
"Vincent"	2026	Teen of Denial (Joe's Story)	Will Toledo	7:45	
"Wachovia Receipts"	2010	Little Pieces Of Paper With "No" Written On Them	Will Toledo	2:17	
"War is Coming (If You Want It)"	2017		Will Toledo	3:26	
"We Are in Space"	2010	2	Will Toledo	4:06	
"We Can't Afford (Your Depression Anymore)"	2013	Nervous Young Man	Will Toledo	4:39	
"We Looked Like Giants"	2023	We Looked Like Giants / Brand New Colony	Ben Gibbard, Nick Harmer, Jason McGerr, Chris Walla	5:14	
"Weightlifters"	2020	Making a Door Less Open	Will Toledo	5:40	
"What Does OUJ Stand For"	2010	1	Will Toledo	3:23	
"What's With You Lately"	2020	Making a Door Less Open	Will Toledo	1:34	
"When I'm Here"	2010	Little Pieces Of Paper With "No" Written On Them	Will Toledo	3:28	
"When Will My Man Come?"	2013	Disjecta Membra	Will Toledo	6:57	
"Who Even Knows"	2010	4	Will Toledo	3:04	
"Will You Please Pass the Milk, Please?"	2010	2	Will Toledo	4:46	
"Yes Bulletin"	2010	1	Will Toledo	3:25	
"You Have to Go to College"	2010	1	Will Toledo	2:38	
"You're in Love With Me"	2014	How to Leave Town	Will Toledo	5:42	

== Notes ==
A.Re-release of the "Teens of Denial" version with different lyrical content for the 2026 album.
