= Car Seat Headrest discography =

American indie band discography

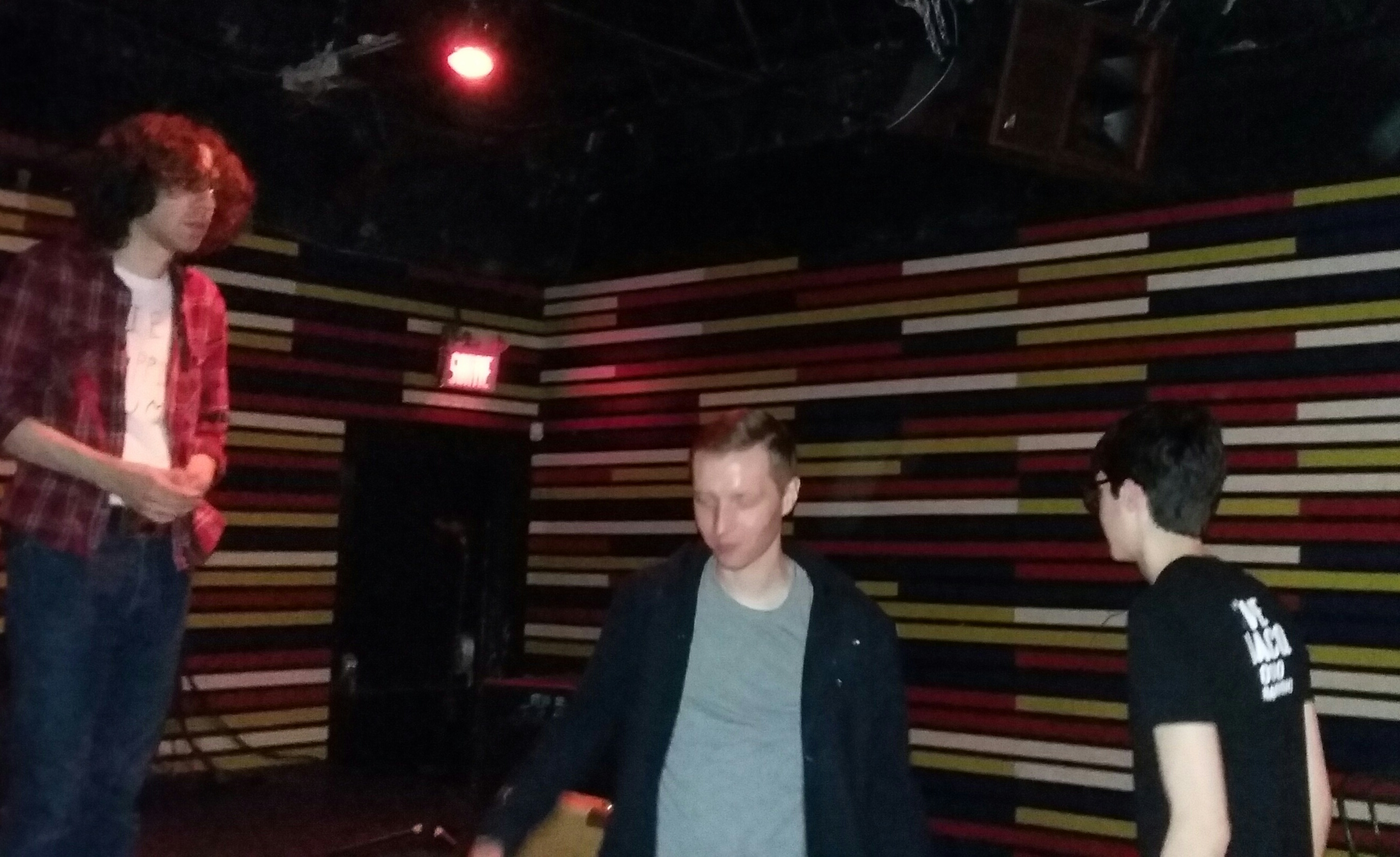
- Studio albums: 14
- EPs: 5
- Live albums: 4
- Compilation albums: 5
- Singles: 22
- Music videos: 8

American rock band Car Seat Headrest has released 14 studio albums, 4 live albums, 5 compilation albums and 5 extended plays. Starting in 2010, band self-released its first eight albums on the platform Bandcamp. In 2015, the band signed to Matador Records, and has since released five albums through the label.

== Albums ==
=== Studio albums ===
Title	Album details	Peak chart positions									
Title	Album details	US	US Indie	AUS	BEL (FL)	BEL (WA)	NED	POR	SCO	SPA	UK
1	Released: May 1, 2010; Label: Self-released; Format: DL	—	—	—	—	—	—	—	—	—	—
2	Released: June 1, 2010; Label: Self-released; Format: DL	—	—	—	—	—	—	—	—	—	—
3	Released: July 16, 2010; Label: Self-released; Format: DL	—	—	—	—	—	—	—	—	—	—
4	Released: August 16, 2010; Label: Self-released; Format: DL	—	—	—	—	—	—	—	—	—	—
My Back Is Killing Me Baby	Released: March 26, 2011; Label: Self-released; Format: CS, DL	—	—	—	—	—	—	—	—	—	—
Twin Fantasy	Released: November 2, 2011; Label: Self-released, Matador (OLE-1330); Format: CD, CS, DL, LP	—	—	—	—	—	—	—	—	—	— (Note: Twin Fantasy (Mirror to Mirror) did not enter the UK Albums Chart, but peaked at number 22 on the UK Record Store Chart.)
Monomania	Released: August 1, 2012; Label: Self-released; Format: CD, DL	—	—	—	—	—	—	—	—	—	—
Nervous Young Man	Released: August 23, 2013; Label: Self-released; Format: DL	—	—	—	—	—	—	—	—	—	—
Teens of Style	Released: October 30, 2015; Label: Matador (OLE-1088); Format: CD, CS, DL, LP	— (Note: Teens of Style did not enter the US Billboard 200, but peaked at number 19 on the US Heatseekers Albums Chart.)	—	—	117	—	—	—	—	—	—
Teens of Denial	Released: May 20, 2016; Label: Matador (OLE-1091); Format: CD, DL, LP	180	15	— (Note: Teens of Denial did not enter the Australian ARIA Albums Chart but peaked at number 13 on the ARIA Hitseekers Chart.)	121	—	82	—	—	—	198
Twin Fantasy (Face to Face)	Released: February 16, 2018; Label: Matador (OLE-1092); Format: CD, CS, DL, LP	92	3	— (Note: Twin Fantasy (Face to Face) did not enter the Australian ARIA Albums Chart but peaked at number three on the ARIA Hitseekers Chart.)	43	200	88	18	29	96	68
Making a Door Less Open	Released: May 1, 2020; Label: Matador (OLE-1558); Format: CD, DL, LP	184	22	86	91	—	— (Note: Making a Door Less Open did not enter the Dutch Album Top 100, but peaked at number 16 on the Dutch Vinyl Albums Chart.)	—	9	—	— (Note: Making a Door Less Open did not enter the UK Albums Chart, but peaked at number 44 on the UK Album Downloads Chart.)
The Scholars	Released: May 2, 2025; Label: Matador (OLE-2132); Format: CD, DL, LP	— (Note: The Scholars did not enter the US Billboard 200, but peaked at number eight on the Top Album Sales Chart.)	35	—	—	—	— (Note: The Scholars did not enter the Dutch Album Top 100, but peaked at number 29 on the Dutch Vinyl Albums Chart.)	—	15	—	— (Note: The Scholars did not enter the UK Albums Chart, but peaked at number 10 on the UK Albums Sales Chart.)
Teen of Denial (Joe's Story)	Released: May 20, 2026; Label: Matador; Format: CD, DL, LP	—	—	—	—	—	—	—	—	—	—
"—" denotes album that did not chart or was not released

=== Live albums ===
Title	Album details
Live at WCWM: Car Seat Headrest	Released: July 6, 2013; Label: Why Me; Format: DL
Spotify Sessions	Released: July 15, 2016; Label: Matador; Format: Streaming
Commit Yourself Completely	Released: June 17, 2019; Label: Matador (OLE-1477); Format: DL, streaming, CDr
Faces from the Masquerade	Released: December 8, 2023; Label: Matador (OLE-2028); Format: DL, streaming, LP

=== Compilation albums ===
Title	Album details
Little Pieces of Paper with "No" Written on Them	Released: December 8, 2010; Label: Self-released; Format: DL
Disjecta Membra	Released: August 23, 2013; Label: Self-released; Format: DL
Twin Fantasy / Monomania / How To Leave Town	Released: May 7, 2015; Label: Self-released; Format: 3xCDr
The MADLO EPs	Released: March 2022; Label: Matador (OLE-1843); Format: CD
Scholars: Early Hack	Released: May 2, 2025; Label: Matador; Format: CD

== Extended plays ==
Title	EP details
Sunburned Shirts	Released: October 5, 2010; Label: Self-released; Format: DL
Living While Starving	Released: November 22, 2012; Label: Self-released; Format: DL
How to Leave Town	Released: October 31, 2014; Label: Self-released; Format: CD, DL
MADLO: Influences	Released: June 20, 2021; Label: Matador (OLE-1806); Format: DL
MADLO: Remixes	Released: June 22, 2021; Label: Matador (OLE-1807); Format: DL

== Singles ==
=== As lead artist ===
Title	Year	Chart positions				Album
Title	Year	US AAA	US Alt.	US Rock Air.	MEX Air.	Album
"No Passion"	2015	—	—	—	—	Teens of Style
"Something Soon"	2015	—	—	—	—	Teens of Style
"Times to Die"	2015	—	—	—	—	Teens of Style
"Vincent"	2016	—	—	—	34	Teens of Denial
"Drunk Drivers/Killer Whales"	2016	—	—	—	—	Teens of Denial
"Fill in the Blank"	2016	—	—	—	—	Teens of Denial
"Drunk Drivers / Killer Whales (Single Version)"	2016	—	—	—	—	Teens of Denial
"Unforgiving Girl (She’s Not A) [Single Version]"	2017	—	—	—	—	Teens of Denial
"War Is Coming (If You Want It)"	2017	—	—	—	—	Non-album single
"Beach Life-In-Death"	2017	—	—	—	—	Twin Fantasy (Face to Face)
"Nervous Young Inhumans"	2018	—	—	—	44	Twin Fantasy (Face to Face)
"Cute Thing"	2018	—	—	—	—	Twin Fantasy (Face to Face)
"My Boy (Twin Fantasy)"	2018	—	—	—	—	Twin Fantasy (Face to Face)
"Can't Cool Me Down"	2020	—	—	—	—	Making a Door Less Open
"Martin"	2020	—	—	—	—	Making a Door Less Open
"Hollywood"	2020	31	29	45	—	Making a Door Less Open
"There Must Be More Than Blood"	2020	—	—	—	—	Making a Door Less Open
"Bodys (Live at Brooklyn Steel)"	2023	—	—	—	—	Faces from the Masquerade
"Gethsemane"	2025	—	—	—	—	The Scholars
"CCF ('I'm Gonna Stay With You')"	2025	—	—	—	—	The Scholars
"The Catastrophe (Good Luck With That, Man)"	2025	—	—	—	—	The Scholars
"—" denotes a recording that did not chart or was not released in that territory.

=== Split singles ===
List of split singles, with year released and other artists shown
Title	Year	Peak chart positions	Other artist(s)
Title	Year	UK Sales	Other artist(s)
"We Looked Like Giants" / "Brand New Colony"	2023	20	The Beths, Pickle Darling

== Appears On ==
List of appearances, showing date released, album, and formats
Track	Release Date	Album	Released By	Format
"Rebelradio"	July 30, 2011	Spiritual Advice in the Vacuum	Beta Snake Records	DL, CD
"House Band"	September 29, 2012	Youth Culture Dummy	Beta Snake Records	DL, CD
"Nobody Dies"	October 29, 2014	Servo Driven Hip Swivel	Beta Snake Records	DL, CD
"Hi Life" (Note: Hi Life was previously released on the 2013 B-Side album, Disjecta Membra)	December 1, 2014	Compilation 2/Slackgaze Split	Air Balloon Tapes	DL, CS
"Lowbrow"	March 16, 2015	If There's Hell Below Present: The Good Shit	If There's Hell Below	DL
"America"	April 15, 2016	The Quad Dub	Luau Records	DL, CD, LP
"Culture"	April 15, 2016	The Quad Dub	Luau Records	DL, CD, LP
"Fill in the Blank"	October 11, 2017	Live Current Volume 13	Live Current	DL, CD
"Vincent (Live)"	November 17, 2017	Live At The World Cafe: 25th Anniversary Edition	World Cafe Records	DL, CD
"Scatterbrain" (Radiohead Cover)	March 5, 2021	Save Stereogum: An '00s Covers Comp	Stereogum	DL
"waiting"	June 3, 2022	act v	kendall :3	DL

== Music videos ==
List of music videos, showing year released and director
Title	Year	Album	Director(s)
"Something Soon"	2011	My Back Is Killing Me Baby	Will Toledo
"Something Soon"	2015	Teens of Style	Jason Reid
"Vincent"	2016	Teens of Denial	Quinn George
"Nervous Young Inhumans"	2018	Twin Fantasy (Face to Face)	Will Toledo
"Hollywood"	2020	Making a Door Less Open	Sabrina Nichols
"Bodys" (Live at Brooklyn Steel)	2023	Faces from the Masquerade	Unknown
"Gethsemane"	2025	The Scholars	Andrew Wonder
"CCF (I'm Gonna Stay With You)"	2025	The Scholars	Cate Wurtz
