= Commit Yourself Completely =

Live album by Car Seat Headrest
- Released: June 17, 2019
- Recorded: April 14–November 8, 2018
- Venue: Various (see track listing)
- Genre: Indie rock
- Length: 66:57
- Label: Matador
- Producer: Will Toledo

Car Seat Headrest chronology
Twin Fantasy (Face to Face) (2018)	Commit Yourself Completely (2019)	Making a Door Less Open (2020)

Commit Yourself Completely is the second live album by American indie rock band Car Seat Headrest, released digitally on June 17, 2019, by Matador Records. It compiles songs performed by the band on tour in 2018 across the United States, United Kingdom and France, with the members of the Naked Giants playing with the group in a seven-person lineup. The album includes live renditions of songs from Teens of Denial (2016) and Twin Fantasy (2018), as well as a cover of Frank Ocean's "Ivy". The album title is taken from the first verse of "Cosmic Hero", a song from Teens of Denial. It was promoted by a video of the band's performance of "Fill in the Blank" at Newport Music Hall.

== Track listing ==
All tracks are written by Will Toledo, except where noted.

No.	Title	Date/Venue	Length
1.	"Cosmic Hero"	2018-11-06 at Tramshed, Cardiff, Wales	10:26
2.	"Fill in the Blank"	2018-09-09 at Newport Music Hall, Columbus, OH, USA	5:05
3.	"Drugs with Friends"	2018-11-03 at La Lune des Pirates, Amiens, France	6:16
4.	"Bodys"	2018-11-03 at La Lune des Pirates, Amiens, France	6:01
5.	"Cute Thing" (contains elements of "Ana Ng" by John Linnell and John Flansburgh)	2018-11-08 at O2 Forum Kentish Town, London, England	6:23
6.	"Drunk Drivers/Killer Whales"	2018-11-08 at O2 Forum Kentish Town, London, England	8:45
7.	"Destroyed by Hippie Powers"	2018-07-15 at Crystal Ballroom, Portland, OR, USA	5:28
8.	"Ivy" (Christopher Breaux, James Ryan Wui Hun Ho)	2018-04-14 at Capitol Theater, Olympia, WA, USA	5:11
9.	"Beach Life-in-Death"	2018-09-28 at Crossroads KC, Kansas City, MO, USA	13:22
Total length:			66:57

== Personnel ==
Credits adapted from Bandcamp.

Performance

- Will Toledo – vocals, guitar on "Ivy"
- Seth Dalby – bass guitar
- Ethan Ives – guitar, vocals
- Andrew Katz – drums, vocals
- Grant Mullen – guitar, vocals
- Gianni Aiello – guitar, keyboards, vocals
- Henry LaVallee – additional percussion

Production

- Will Toledo – production, mixing
- Andrew Katz – mixing, mastering
- John McRae – engineering
- Veronica Anderson – sleeve photo
