= Beach Life-in-Death =

2017 song by Car Seat Headrest

Single by Car Seat Headrest

from the album Twin Fantasy (Face to Face)
- Released: December 13, 2017
- Genre: Indie rock
- Length: 13:19
- Label: Matador
- Songwriter: Will Toledo
- Producer: Will Toledo

Car Seat Headrest singles chronology
"War Is Coming (If You Want It)" (2017)	"Beach Life-in-Death" (2017)	"Nervous Young Inhumans" (2018)

"Beach Life-in-Death"

Song by Car Seat Headrest

from the album Twin Fantasy
- Released: November 2, 2011
- Genre: Indie rock; lo-fi
- Length: 12:10
- Label: Self-released
- Songwriter: Will Toledo
- Producer: Will Toledo

"Beach Life-in-Death" is a song written by American rock musician Will Toledo, that was originally released on Twin Fantasy (2011), his sixth album under his Car Seat Headrest alias. After Car Seat Headrest expanded to become a four-piece band, the song was re-recorded and re-released on December 13, 2017 as the lead single for their album Twin Fantasy (Face to Face) (2018), which is a complete studio re-recording of the original album.

== Background ==
According to Toledo, the idea of writing a song longer than ten minutes was influenced by the music of progressive rock band Pink Floyd, alongside the tracks "The Past is a Grotesque Animal" by Of Montreal and "Looter's Follies" by Destroyer. Toledo would walk around Williamsburg, Virginia thinking about how the different parts of the song would fit together, which contrasted with his songwriting process for previous Car Seat Headrest projects. The writing process for "Beach Life-in-Death" also influenced his songwriting process for the rest of the songs on Twin Fantasy, with Toledo noting:

"I wasn't thinking about music unless I was literally working on it. Planning out “Beach Life-in-Death” and working on it was definitely where the palette of the album took place, where it was going to be this sort of carefully crafted thing that reflected a larger plan, not just a collection of songs."

During the writing and recording of Twin Fantasy, Toledo released demos and snippets of the album's songs on his Tumblr, including "Beach Life-in-Death". "Beach Life-in-Death" was first officially released on November 2, 2011, on Bandcamp along with the rest of Twin Fantasy. Toledo remastered the 2011 version of Twin Fantasy in 2013, noting that "Beach Life-in-Death" was the most different because of added bass.

After signing with Matador Records and completing their tenth studio album Teens of Denial (2016), sessions for the re-recording of Twin Fantasy began in mid-2016, and finished in mid-2017. The re-recording of "Beach Life-in-Death" was surprise-released on December 13, 2017, causing much speculation that a complete re-recording of Twin Fantasy would be released soon. A few weeks later, an Amazon listing confirmed the project. Toledo later confirmed that "Nervous Young Inhumans" was intended to be the lead single, however since Matador wanted to wait until January to announce the album, he asked if he could release the new "Beach Life-in-Death" with no prior announcement or explanation. The cover art for the single was created by Hojin "Stella" Jung, who also contributed the CD booklet art for Twin Fantasy (Face to Face).

== Composition ==
"Beach Life-in-Death" is an indie rock and surf rock song split into three distinct parts, as shown in the lyric booklets for both versions of Twin Fantasy. The first and third parts are high energy, with fast guitar strumming and vocals, while the second part has a slower tempo, with a quieter arrangement and vocal performance. The song's parts share multiple lyrical motifs, such as "The ocean washed over your grave", and "Last night I dreamed he was trying to kill you/I woke up and I was trying to kill you". The song also references several earlier Car Seat Headrest songs from the album 3, "Beach Death", "Beach Funeral", and "Beach Fagz." Lyrically, the 2011 and 2017 versions of the song are very similar, with the most drastic lyrical differences coming in Part II, which replaces a verse referencing Aubrey Beardsley's art with lines Toledo had written for his cover of "Ivy" by Frank Ocean.

== Reception ==
=== 2011 version ===
Steve Hyden of Uproxx, while writing a guide to all Car Seat Headrest projects, described the track as the most stunning work Twin Fantasy had to offer. Moreover, they described it as a "harrowing psychodrama that recalls how the narrator 'pretended to be drunk when I came out to my friends' before exploring the fantasies he now has about murdering his boyfriend." Overall, they noted that the track, a "long, exploratory song composed of epic narratives and multiple musical movements" would become a staple of Toledo's sound in the future.

=== 2017 version ===
The re-recording received acclaim from critics and the public. Sasha Geffen of Pitchfork praised the single, stating that instead of "smoothing over" the original, it "reinvigorates" it. Elaborating, they state that the track "hits all the same itchy, unnerved points that Toledo usually favors in his sprawling rock guitar". They also state that the track is split into three unique sections, "like a matryoshka doll of rock tropes". Lyrically, they state that it "oscillate[d] between the mundanities of staying alive—eating, sleeping, working, eating again—and the jitters of negotiating a queer identity and relationship". Overall, they state that in "Beach Life-in-Death", Toledo embodies making your skin crawl "with the kind of unhinged ferocity that only fits inside three songs wrapped into one."

The A.V. Club was also favorable to the re-recording, stating that Toledo's "fiery energy" remains intact, describing the track as a "jaw-dropping series of gear shifts". Collin Brennan of Consequence believed "Beach Life-in Death" to be the staple highlight of Twin Fantasy (Face to Face). They stated that the track "finds the young songwriter grappling with a queer identity amidst a loose, three-part structure that provides just enough support to withstand a storm of guitar solos, quasi-spoken monologues, and verses collapsing into bridges collapsing into codas". Overall, believing it to be a "breathtaking composition that demands multiple listens and rewards in each turn".

Writing for The Guardian, Michael Hann believed the track showcased Toledo trying to "unpack his confusion and bitterness and resentment, with swoops into devastating clarity". Hannah Vettese of Record Collector used "Beach Life-in-Death" as an example of how Toledo's lyrics have become "far clearer in the mix", elaborating by stating his ability to capture "angst, fury, depression, and joy of human life". Tom Brewster of The Edge described "Beach Life-in-Death" as lyrically, being "cripplingly introspective" with "detailed lyrics" that pick apart "both unrequited love and the terrors of an increasingly modern age with a charmingly awkward flourish". they described the track as evolving from "bedroom rock" to an anthemic ballad of "teenage confusion". He also complemented the guitar work of Ethan Ives, describing them as sounding "strained" and "squealing"

== Live performances and covers ==
"Beach Life-in-Death" has been a staple of the band's setlist, often closing their live performances. It is featured on both the band's live albums released under Matador, as the final track on Commit Yourself Completely and the penultimate track on Faces From The Masquerade.

American indie rock band Glass Beach covered the track as a standalone single on January 7, 2021.

American indie rock band WillyRodriguezWasTaken covered the track for the fan-curated album r/CSHFans covers Car Seat Headrest... Again!.
