= The Scholars (album) =

Studio album by Car Seat Headrest
- Released: May 2, 2025
- Studio: Temple of the Trees (Seattle)
- Length: 70:32; 127:47 (deluxe)
- Label: Matador
- Producer: Will Toledo

Car Seat Headrest chronology
Faces from the Masquerade (2023)	The Scholars (2025)	Teen of Denial (Joe's Story) (2026)

Singles from The Scholars
- 1. "Gethsemane" Released: March 4, 2025; 2. "CCF (I'm Gonna Stay with You)" Released: April 2, 2025; 3. "The Catastrophe (Good Luck with That, Man)" Released: April 29, 2025

The Scholars is the thirteenth studio album by American indie rock band Car Seat Headrest, released on May 2, 2025, through Matador Records. Work on the album began in spring 2023, after frontman Will Toledo began to recover from long COVID and histamine intolerance. While recording, collaboration within the band was greater, with other members contributing to the writing process.

The album was teased through an alternate reality game-style website that gradually revealed snippets of the track "Gethsemane". In contrast to the indietronica and standalone songs of their previous album, Making a Door Less Open (2020), The Scholars has been promoted as a concept album and a rock opera, based around several characters who attend a university. It was accompanied by three singles; "Gethsemane" on March 4, "CCF (I'm Gonna Stay With You)" on April 2, and "The Catastrophe (Good Luck with That, Man)" on April 29.

== Background and recording ==
While on the band's 2022 North American Tour (also called the "Masquerade Tour") frontman Will Toledo was diagnosed with COVID-19, along with drummer Andrew Katz. Toledo's condition later progressed into long COVID. After his health continued to deteriorate, leading to him becoming bedridden, Toledo cancelled the remainder of the band's tour dates in October 2022. During this time, the band considered disbanding for Toledo's health. The band also considered excluding touring completely, opting to exclusively record albums.

Toledo was later diagnosed with histamine intolerance, forcing him to adopt a restricted diet. Once his health began to improve in spring 2023, work on what would become The Scholars began with extended jam sessions in order to ease back into playing after a year off. With the jam sessions, the band's live dynamic was brought into the studio, resulting in more collaboration between band members while writing and recording the album. Compared to previous Car Seat Headrest albums, where Toledo would bring solo demos to the band and flesh them out, The Scholars saw some songs originate from other members of the band. As songs began to take form, Toledo stated the band would not "fight" the lengths of songs, stating "I think we were just going to allow each song to be what it would be". The Scholars is the first Car Seat Headrest album where the songwriting credits list the entire band as writers for all songs, rather than being written solely by Toledo.

As for his leadership role in the band's creative process, Toledo stated that he was "more of an organizer than the composer", and he felt his strengths lied in "prodding something that's already there into a direction that I see it going". Toledo encouraged guitarist Ethan Ives to take ownership of the sound design on the record, and Ives also co-wrote the song "Reality". Similar to other projects by the band, The Scholars was entirely self-produced by Toledo. However, unlike the band's previous albums, it was mostly recorded using analog equipment.

== Concept ==
The Scholars is a rock opera and concept album that features a cast of eight characters. Its storyline takes place at a fictional college named Parnassus University, which is home to "students and staff whose travails illuminate a loose narrative of life, death, and rebirth" and was founded by a "famed playwright" known as the Scop. Each song is sung from the perspective of one of these characters, who make up the university's faculty and student body. "Gethsemane" follows a protagonist named Rosa. "CCF (I'm Gonna Stay With You)" follows a protagonist named Beolco who is "deeply fond" of the university and its founder. Beolco believes himself to be a reincarnation of the founder, and seeks confirmation of his beliefs.

The album draws inspirations from sources such as Shakespeare, Mozart, classical opera, various Biblical and religious texts, and albums such as Tommy by The Who and The Rise and Fall of Ziggy Stardust and the Spiders from Mars by David Bowie. Themes of the album include "yearning, youth, and religious anxiety".

== Release ==
An example of one of the WebQuest tasks, where users drag pixels onto a canvas to unlock a snippet of "Gethsemane".

Matador founder Chris Lombardi came up with the idea of a game to promote the album. After hearing "Gethsemane", Lombardi wanted the band to release the song one piece at a time, inspired by its structure. Toledo came up with the idea of a scavenger hunt and composed the puzzles himself, inspired by the 1979 book Masquerade. While originally intended to be a video game, Katz said there wasn't enough time to create it. The game, known as a "WebQuest", was launched on February 18, 2025, on the band's website and shared similarities with alternate reality games. Users were able to solve puzzles themed around school subjects like science or mathematics to gradually unlock snippets. New puzzles were added regularly, culminating in the full version of "Gethsemane" and the album cover for The Scholars being revealed on February 28.

On March 4, "Gethsemane" premiered on BBC Radio 6, and was officially released as the album's lead single on streaming services, alongside the official album announcement and pre-order. The song was accompanied with a music video directed by Andrew Wonder, described as a "black-and-white short film". The album's second single, "CCF (I'm Gonna Stay With You)", was released on April 2, alongside a music video directed by longtime collaborator Cate Wurtz. The album's final single, "The Catastrophe (Good Luck With That, Man)", was released on April 29.

The Scholars was released on May 2, 2025, through Matador Records; five years and one day from the release of Making a Door Less Open. Physical deluxe versions of the album include a bonus CD titled Scholars: Early Hack, containing nineteen demos from The Scholars' recording sessions. A "conservatively planned" tour in support of the album was also announced, which began on May 16 and ended on November 1. The band aimed to space out their live shows to be considerate of Toledo's health.

== Reception ==
Professional ratings
Aggregate scores
Source	Rating
AnyDecentMusic?	7.6/10
Metacritic	79/100
Review scores
Source	Rating
AllMusic	4.5/5 stars
DIY	4/5 stars
Hot Press	7/10
The Line of Best Fit	7/10
Mojo	4/5 stars
Paste	8.5/10
Pitchfork	6.5/10
PopMatters	8/10
Rolling Stone	3.5/5 stars
Slant	3.5/5 stars

The Scholars was received positively by critics. At Metacritic, which aggregates scores from mainstream critics, The Scholars has an average score of 79 based on 13 reviews, indicating a score of "generally favorable".

In a review for AllMusic, Mark Deming called The Scholars "unquestionably [Toledo's] finest work to date" and "one of the best albums of 2025". Writing for DIY, Ben Tipple noted how the scale of the album contrasted the band's previous works and wrote "there really is a new world to explore, quite literally". Critic Peter McGoran of Hot Press called the album "perhaps their most ambitious [album] yet" and a "compelling effort". Reviewing the album for Mojo, David Fricke called the album a "rock opera worthy of the form". Tatiana Tenreyro of Paste called it the band's "best new album in almost a decade". Tenreyro also noted how the band's depressive songwriting wasn't present in The Scholars, instead containing a "complex and, at times, cryptic" narrative.

In a review for The Line of Best Fit, Joshua Mills stated it was an album that tried to make a "grand statement", and that there was a "story for those who want it and some delightful songcraft for those who don't". Rolling Stone's Jon Dolan called the album "admirable", and noted how the band could head in any direction. Grace Robins-Somerville of Stereogum wrote that The Scholars was "Car Seat Headrest at their densest and most esoteric", and concluded that the album showed "a band laying out the impulses and fascinations that they've been leaning into for their entire career". Leah Johnson of Flood Magazine enjoyed the narrative and rock opera format, writing "Car Seat Headrest hasn't been this bold since Teens of Denial" and calling the album "career-turning".

Some critics were less positive. Writer Jeremy Winograd of Slant gave the album 3.5/5, calling some songs "needlessly drawn out" and describing the plot as "never explicitly fleshed out enough" and concluding by calling the album "lumbering". Steven Hyden of Uproxx wrote that "those songs don't enough "song" in them" and that "quality tunes" haven't been the focus of a Car Seat Headrest album for almost a decade.

== Track listing ==
All songs are written by Car Seat Headrest.

The Scholars track listing
No.	Title	Length
1.	"CCF (I'm Gonna Stay with You)" ( (Note: "CCF (I'm Gonna Stay with You)" interpolates lyrics from the traditional French carol "Il est né, le divin Enfant"))	8:11
2.	"Devereaux"	4:30
3.	"Lady Gay Approximately" ( (Note: "Lady Gay Approximately" adapts elements from the traditional song "Lady Gay"))	3:47
4.	"The Catastrophe (Good Luck with That, Man)"	5:28
5.	"Equals"	4:11
6.	"Gethsemane"	10:51
7.	"Reality"	11:14
8.	"Planet Desperation" ( (Note: "Planet Desperation" interpolates lyrics from the hymn "Amazing Grace", written by John Newton))	18:52
9.	"True/False Lover" ( (Note: "True/False Lover" interpolates lyrics from the traditional English ballad "Scarborough Fair"))	3:28
Total length:		70:32

Scholars: Early Hack bonus CD track listing
No.	Title	Length
10.	"TOTT1"	1:20
11.	"Epops"	4:05
12.	"TOTT2"	1:35
13.	"World War"	6:37
14.	"World War TV"	1:58
15.	"Say My Name"	1:19
16.	"Zebedee Dirt"	4:59
17.	"Fallen in the Mud"	1:57
18.	"Old Encino"	3:30
19.	"Harmonics"	1:56
20.	"Catastrophe"	5:36
21.	"I Am Yours"	1:04
22.	"Jury Duty"	1:47
23.	"Reality"	4:34
24.	"0t0 2"	1:52
25.	"Reality 0t0"	0:56
26.	"False Life Lived"	7:47
27.	"Black Match"	7:03
28.	"TOTT1point2"	4:00
Total length:		127:47

== Personnel ==
Credits adapted from the vinyl liner notes.

- Will Toledo – vocals, piano, organ, wurlitzer, "some rhythm guitar"
- Andrew Katz – drums, auxiliary percussion, vocals (track 8)
- Ethan Ives – electric guitar, acoustic guitar, lead vocals (track 7, parts of track 8)
- Seth Dalby – bass, synth and drum programming, group vocals (track 8)

Additional musicians

- Arps – French horn (tracks 1, 5, 6, 8)
- Chester the Geroo – voice sample (track 9)
- Voxxy – voice sample (track 9)
- Voxxy's mother – voice sample (track 9)
- d0ghead – sonic textures (track 6), group vocals (track 8)
- Scurrow T. Oat (Michael Paul Zottoli) – accordion (tracks 1, 2, 7)
- James Ostrander – clarinet (track 6)
- John McRae – claps (track 9)
- Andy Zicari – trumpet (tracks 1, 7)

Production

- Will Toledo – production, mixing
- John McRae – engineering, mixing
- Ted Jensen – mastering
- Cate Wurtz – artwork
- Kai Becker – front cover photo, additional photos
- Mateo Brooks – additional photos
- Billis Helg – additional photos
- Mike Zimmerman – layout

== Charts ==
Chart performance for The Scholars
Chart (2025)	Peak position
Scottish Albums (Official Charts)	15
UK Album Downloads (Official Charts)	14
UK Independent Albums (Official Charts)	6
US Independent Albums (Billboard)	35
