= Nervous Young Man =

2013 studio album by Car Seat Headrest

- Cover used since 2017.

Studio album by Car Seat Headrest
- Released: August 29, 2013 (Note: All digital releases of Nervous Young Man list the intended release date of August 23, 2013. The album's actual release was delayed to August 29 due to a hard drive crash.)
- Recorded: 2009–2013
- Genre: Slacker rock
- Length: 129:23
- Label: Self-released
- Producer: Will Toledo

Car Seat Headrest chronology
Starving While Living (2012)	Nervous Young Man (2013)	Disjecta Membra (2014)

Nervous Young Man is the eighth solo studio album by American musician Will Toledo released under the Car Seat Headrest alias. It was self-released via Bandcamp on August 29, 2013, and served as Car Seat Headrest's final album as a solo project.

A double album, clocking in at two hours and nine minutes, it is the band's longest release to date. Described on Bandcamp as featuring "tracks written from ages 17 to 21", the album was conceptualized as a "greatest hits" album, despite being composed almost entirely of newly written material. (Note: "Boxing Day", "Big Jacket", and "Crows" were previously released on Boxing Day/I Need Money Not Friends, The Loudness War by Nervous Young Men, and via Cate Wurtz's Lamezone respectively.) The title of the album and three of the songs come from Toledo's high school project, Nervous Young Men.

== Recording and release ==
Toledo began recording Nervous Young Man following the release of Car Seat Headrest's seventh album, Monomania. While working on the album, Toledo shared several tracks on SoundCloud during the 2012 Christmas season, before officially announcing the album on Tumblr, on July 15, 2013. However, shortly before the album was scheduled to release, the hard drive for Toledo's laptop crashed, resulting in a partial loss of the album. In the following days, Toledo reached out to those who had downloaded the tracks he previously shared in order to finish uploading the album to Bandcamp. Due to the crash, the album was released on August 29. However, the album is presently listed on Bandcamp and streaming services as being released on August 23, to match Toledo's intended release date.

According to Toledo, the writing process of Car Seat Headrest's tenth album, Teens of Denial, came as a response to fan and critical reaction to Nervous Young Man, along with his own experiences creating the album. In an interview with Loud And Quiet, Toledo stated:

“I think people just had a hard time listening to it because it was so long, on a personal level, I kind of disliked it because a lot of the songs were more interested in songcraft than emotional engagement. I felt like I couldn’t engage with it as soon as the album was done. I struggle to make every song a deep reflection of myself and something I can connect to intimately. But that took a long time to come into shape, even though I know what I wanted to do. Usually knowing what you want to do does take longer to come into shape because you have to reject more material."

When Toledo re-uploaded the album to streaming services in 2017, the album cover was changed to an edited version of the original cover that replaced Toledo with a new drawing, and changed the colors to be nearly grayscale. Toledo explained his discomfort with the 2013 cover of him being shirtless as the reason for the change.

== Reception ==
Sean Elliot of The Daily Album praised the record, specifically highlighting opener "Boxing Day", which they described as a 15-minute "coming of age epic" that moves "back and forth between acoustic guitar and vocal confessions, raucous, distorted electric rock interludes, drunken, reverberated rambles ala Johnny Cash, crunchy, electro rock, and somber organ and electronic percussion". Other highlights included "We Can't Afford (Your Depression Anymore)", "Don't Remind Me", "Afterglow", and "Plane Crash Blues (I Can't Play the Piano)".

In a 2016 Reddit AMA, Toledo described the album as "a sleeper hit", adding "I don't know if anyone even listened all the way through at the time."

== Track listing ==
All tracks are written by Will Toledo unless stated.

Disc 1: Love
No.	Title	Length
1.	"Boxing Day"	15:35
2.	"We Can't Afford (Your Depression Anymore)"	4:45
3.	"Don't Remind Me"	4:45
4.	"Homes"	6:41
5.	"Afterglow"	5:04
6.	"Jerks"	5:30
7.	"Broken Birds (Rest in Pieces)"	8:22
8.	"The Gun Song" (contains lyrics and elements of the song "Down by the River", written by Neil Young)	16:05
9.	"Goodbye Love"	1:48
10.	"I Can Play the Piano"	5:20

Disc 2: Death
No.	Title	Length
11.	"Crows (Rest in Bigger Pieces Mix)"	4:24
12.	"I Wanna Sweat"	5:52
13.	"Burning Man"	5:33
14.	"Dreams Fall Hard"	6:31
15.	"Plane Crash Blues (I Can't Play the Piano)"	5:43
16.	"Big Jacket"	5:05
17.	"Death at the Movies"	6:54
18.	"Jus' Tired"	5:27
19.	"Some Strange Angel"	5:49
20.	"Knife in the Coffee" (contains lyrics of the song "Time Has Come Today", written by Joe Chambers and Willie Chambers)	4:26
Total length:		129:23

Notes

- The streaming version of "The Gun Song" is subtitled the "No Trigger Version", which removes the elements of "Down by the River".
- Toledo has said that tracks 19 and 20 are "not in any particular order" and that the listener may choose an ending track that fits best for them.
- “Boxing Day” originally appeared on Will Toledo’s 2009 project Nervous Young Men, on the albums “I Need Money Not Friends,” and its reissue, “Boxing Day.”
- “Knife in the Coffee” is a reworking of the Nervous Young Men song “Clowns in My Coffee,” which originally appeared on “The Bell Jar.”
- Big Jacket originally appeared on the Nervous Young Men album “The Loudness War,” as well as 1.

== Personnel ==
Car Seat Headrest

- Will Toledo – all vocals and instrumentation, except:

Additional personnel

- Amanda Schiano di Cola – trumpet (tracks 1, 14, 15, 18)
- Austin Ruhf – cello (track 8)
- JohnAugust – "the Voice of the Law" (track 14)

== Disjecta Membra ==
Disjecta Membra

Compilation album by Car Seat Headrest
- Released: August 29, 2013
- Genres: Indie rock; lo-fi
- Length: 78:25
- Label: Self-released
- Producer: Will Toledo

Car Seat Headrest chronology
Nervous Young Man (2013)	Disjecta Membra (2013)	How to Leave Town (2014)

Disjecta Membra is the second compilation album released by American musician Will Toledo under the Car Seat Headrest alias. It was personally emailed by Toledo to anyone who purchased Nervous Young Man for five dollars or more within the first year of its release. The compilation contained songs that were recorded from "Twin Fantasy era to [2013]" along with more re-recorded songs from the Nervous Young Men project, such as "Napoleon (March Into Russia)" and "Please Mr. Pilot".

=== Track listing ===
All tracks are written by Will Toledo, except when noted.

No.	Title	Length
1.	"Endpiece"	0:42
2.	"Please Mr Pilot"	3:13
3.	"2:24"	2:57
4.	"The Hard Part"	3:36
5.	"Sound Man / Low Fidelity"	5:12
6.	"Napoleon (March Into Russia)"	6:07
7.	"Drunk on a Work Night"	1:20
8.	"Love Me Too Much"	3:28
9.	"Dream: Encounter on Smoke Mountain"	10:00
10.	"Sinner"	5:28
11.	"When Will My Man Come?"	6:57
12.	"Hi Life"	4:02
13.	"AC"	2:48
14.	"If Not, Then Oh Well"	5:57
15.	"Memories" (Leonard Cohen)	5:32
16.	"KS"	6:36
17.	"Unfinished: Pain Star (If Heaven Is Full of People...)"	4:39
Total length:		78:25
