= Ivy (song) =

2016 song by Frank Ocean

Song by Frank Ocean

from the album Blonde
- Released: August 20, 2016
- Genre: Indie rock; futuristic R&B
- Length: 4:09
- Label: Boys Don't Cry
- Songwriters: Christopher Breaux; Malay Ho
- Producers: Frank Ocean; Om'Mas Keith; Rostam Batmanglij

"Ivy" is a song by American R&B singer Frank Ocean, released as a part of his 2016 studio album Blonde. The minimalistic guitar-driven song embodies indie rock, avant-R&B and guitar pop, with its nostalgic lyrics exploring memories of a lost love. Ocean wrote the song with frequent collaborator Malay Ho, and produced it with Om'Mas Keith and former Vampire Weekend multi-instrumentalist Rostam Batmanglij, the latter of whom also arranged the track. Guitars on the track are performed by a musician credited as Fish. The track appeared on multiple year-end lists, with some critics describing it as amongst Ocean's best work, and charted at number 80 on the Billboard Hot 100 chart, despite not being released as a single.

== Background ==
Ocean initially debuted a version of the song in a live performance in Munich, in June 2013, alongside "Seigfried". The version performed live differed significantly from the track included on Blonde, incorporating a jazz style not evident in the studio recording, as well as alternative grammatical person in sections of the track.

== Composition and lyrics ==
"Ivy" is an indie rock and futuristic R&B song, with the track employing "heady guitar work" Ocean had previously displayed an admiration for. The track has been described as a "guitar pop reverie" and a "minimalist guitar chug", featuring "chiming" palm-muted power chords "doused in crystalline tones" and no percussion. The track depicts an "avant-R&B tale of heartbreak [sung] over distorted electric guitar", and incorporates the soul and rock of Ocean's earlier work with a hip hop sensibility. The "shimmery" guitar intertwines with Ocean's vocals, forming a "snake space" described as "mesmerizing". The track's only other musical element is a subtly propulsive bass line. The guitar's melody was produced and arranged by Rostam Batmanglij (formerly of the band Vampire Weekend), who was inspired by the song "Under Control" by The Strokes. The track's use of guitar has been compared to the indie rock of Alex G, with the "sheer force" of Ocean's voice differentiating the song from other "intimate strummers". The guitar tone emphasises Ocean's word "dreaming", which is repeated in a high-pitched squeal as the track concludes, with Ocean's vocals being compared to Prince. The track then features multiple seconds of indeterminate background noise, symbolising how "messiness both fucks with grace and makes it possible". The song has been compared to "Usher singing for Deerhunter", in relation to its incorporation of indie rock and R&B.

The track has been described as a "ballad of reflection and regret". It features Ocean reminiscing "poignantly" and nostalgically about lost youth, innocence, love and sex, with the repeated lyric "I thought that I was dreaming when you said you loved me" plaintively addressing someone whose heart was broken by the narrator. The line "the feeling still deep down is good" highlights the ultimately worthwhile nature of the relationship. The song has been likened to "a diary entry where a long-buried memory surges back into his mind in bits and pieces", with the "bittersweet angst" being compared to Brian Wilson, "mourn[ing]" that "We'll never be those kids again". Ocean's voice is digitally manipulated such that he sounds younger, in order to capture the time period the track evokes.

== Critical reception ==
Marc Hogan of Pitchfork awarded the song "Best New Track", stating that the track continued Ocean's tradition of masterful short story writing, and that "the lyrics refer back to and build on themselves, so the emotional payoff is all the more powerful". The publication later listed the song as the fourth best of the year, with Jace Clayton writing that "love songs that trade in high-contrast emotions draped over straightforward song structures may be aspirational but they rarely ring true, which is why this love song stays with us, irrefutable and unexpected". Rob Sheffield of Rolling Stone listed the song as the second-best track of 2016, describing it as "the most powerful song Ocean has created yet". Chris Payne of Billboard listed it in Ocean's top ten tracks, praising the track's incorporation of indie rock.

== Cover performances ==
American indie rock band Car Seat Headrest regularly covered the track live after the song's release, featuring reworked lyrics that were incorporated into their 2017 re-recording of "Beach Life-in-Death". A 2018 performance of the cover was included on their live album Commit Yourself Completely. Australian hip hop group Thundamentals covered the song in December 2017, as a part of Australian radio station Triple J's "Like A Version" segment. American singer-songwriter Indigo de Souza covered the song in November 2021.

== Personnel ==
- Frank Ocean – lead vocals, composer, lyricist, production
- Malay – composer, lyricist
- Om'Mas Keith – production
- Rostam Batmanglij – production, arrangement
- Fish – guitars

== Charts ==
Chart (2016)	Peak position
Canada Hot 100 (Billboard)	75
New Zealand Heatseekers (Recorded Music NZ)	3
UK Singles (Official Charts Company)	103
UK Hip Hop/R&B (Official Charts)	16
US Billboard Hot 100	80
US Hot R&B/Hip-Hop Songs (Billboard)	28

== Certifications ==
Region	Certification	Certified units/sales
Denmark (IFPI Danmark)	Platinum	90,000^{‡}
New Zealand (RMNZ)	4× Platinum	120,000^{‡}
United Kingdom (BPI)	2× Platinum	1,200,000^{‡}
^{‡} Sales+streaming figures based on certification alone.
