= Monomania (Car Seat Headrest album) =

2012 album by Car Seat Headrest

Studio album by Car Seat Headrest
- Released: August 1, 2012
- Genres: Indie rock; indietronica; lo-fi
- Length: 61:18
- Label: Self-released
- Producer: Will Toledo

Car Seat Headrest chronology
Twin Fantasy (2011)	Monomania (2012)	Starving While Living (2012)

Monomania is the seventh solo studio album by American indie rock musician Will Toledo under the Car Seat Headrest moniker. The songs "Maud Gone", "Times to Die" and "Los Borrachos" were re-recorded for their 2015 album Teens of Style. It was self-released on Bandcamp on August 1, 2012.

== Background and release ==
Will Toledo described Monomania as the final part of a "triptych" of albums (My Back Is Killing Me Baby, Twin Fantasy, and Monomania) about the same relationship, with Monomania being about the break-up of it, and the only one written after the relationship was over.

== Track listing ==
All tracks are written by Will Toledo.

No.	Title	Length
1.	"Romantic Theory"	3:42
2.	"Misheard Lyrics" (featuring Nora Knight)	5:38
3.	"Times to Die"	6:40
4.	"Overexposed (Enjoy)"	4:33
5.	"Los Borrachos (I Don't Have Any Hope Left, But the Weather Is Nice)"	6:06
6.	"Souls"	9:42
7.	"Maud Gone"	5:36
8.	"Sleeping With Strangers"	5:17
9.	"Anchorite (Love You Very Much)"	14:04
Total length:		61:18

== Personnel ==
Credits adapted from Bandcamp

Car Seat Headrest

- Will Toledo – all vocals and instrumentation, except:

Additional personnel

- Nora Knight – co-lead vocals (track 2)
- Daniel Kent – saxophone (track 7)
