= Teen of Denial (Joe's Story) =

Studio album by Car Seat Headrest
- Released: May 20, 2026
- Recorded: 2015–2016; 2026
- Studio: Soundhouse (Seattle)
- Genre: Indie rock
- Length: 69:15
- Label: Matador
- Producer: Steve Fisk

Car Seat Headrest chronology
The Scholars (2025)	Teen of Denial (Joe's Story) (2026)

Teen of Denial (Joe's Story) is the fourteenth studio album by American indie rock band Car Seat Headrest. A "re-imagination" of their tenth studio album Teens of Denial, it features a different album concept, lyrics, songs, mixing, and instrumentation on top of the original recordings. It was released by Matador Records on May 20, 2026, the tenth anniversary of Teens of Denial, and as part of Matador's "Revisionist History" reissue series. The album received polarizing reactions from both critics and fans for its changes and perceived lack of necessity.

== Background and release ==
Teens of Denial was released on May 20, 2016 and was the first major label album by the band to consist of new material, receiving overwhelming praise from critics and fans. In 2026, between May 12 and May 15, fans received early copies of Teen of Denial (Joe's Story), alongside letters from Matador Records and Toledo. Founding member and lead singer Will Toledo began development of Joe's Story after revisiting Teens of Denial for its tenth anniversary and began viewing it as a concept record revolving around the character of "Joe", who appears numerous times on the original record, inspired by Daniel Johnston. Toledo said that Joe functioned more as a placeholder than a character on Teens of Denial, whereas he gave the character a more fleshed out backstory on Joe's Story, similar to the rock opera storytelling on 2025's The Scholars.

In order to maintain the original sound of the record, the band reunited with Teens of Denial producer Steve Fisk. When writing the original record in 2013 and 2014, Toledo said he had been dealing with a lot of cynicism and aggression and that Joe's Story was what Teens of Denial was "always supposed to be". Toledo also noted:

"This time, I could pull memories of that darkness, and use the distance and additional perspective of ten years of life to shed a fuller light on the experience. Joe is a character going through some of what I experienced, and some of his own problems. Telling his story, and not just my own impressions of life at the end of the teen years, brought a new level of compassion and wholeness to the album."

The album contains new mixing, lyrical changes, two new tracks, "Optimistic Son" and "Joe Drives Again" which replace "Not What I Needed" and "Unforgiving Girl", as well as new arrangements. Notably, the album removes all profanity and has greater emphasis on themes of religion. Joe's Story officially released to streaming services on May 20, 2026, while physical editions released on October 16, 2026.

== Track listing ==
Teen of Denial (Joe's Story) tracklist
No.	Title	Length
1.	"Fill in the Blank"	4:11
2.	"Vincent"	7:44
3.	"Destroyed by Hippie Powers"	5:05
4.	"(Joe Gets Kicked Out of School For Using) Drugs with Friends (But Says This Isn't A Problem)"	5:57
5.	"Optimistic Son"	3:45
6.	"Drunk Drivers / Killer Whales"	6:28
7.	"1937 State Park"	4:03
8.	"Joe Drives Again"	4:07
9.	"Cosmic Hero"	8:30
10.	"The Ravenous House"	11:32
11.	"Connect the Dots (Song of Secretariat)"	6:23
12.	"Joe Goes to School"	1:30
Total length:		69:15

=== Notes ===
- "The Ravenous House" is instrumentally and structurally very similar to "The Ballad of the Costa Concordia" on Teens of Denial, but has different lyrical content.

== Personnel ==
Car Seat Headrest

- Will Toledo – vocals, guitars, organ, piano, Mellotron
- Ethan Ives – bass, vocals, guitars, vibrato switch on organ
- Andrew Katz – drums, mixed percussion, Mellotron, vocals
- Seth Dalby – bass

Additional musicians

- Jon Maus – trumpets and trombone (tracks 2, 9, 10)
- Nick Shadel – piano (track 10)
- Jim Dejoie – saxophone (track 11)

Production

- Steve Fisk – production
- Gordon S. Fisk – back cover photograph
- Mike Zimmerman – cover layout, design
