= Naked Giants =

American rock music group

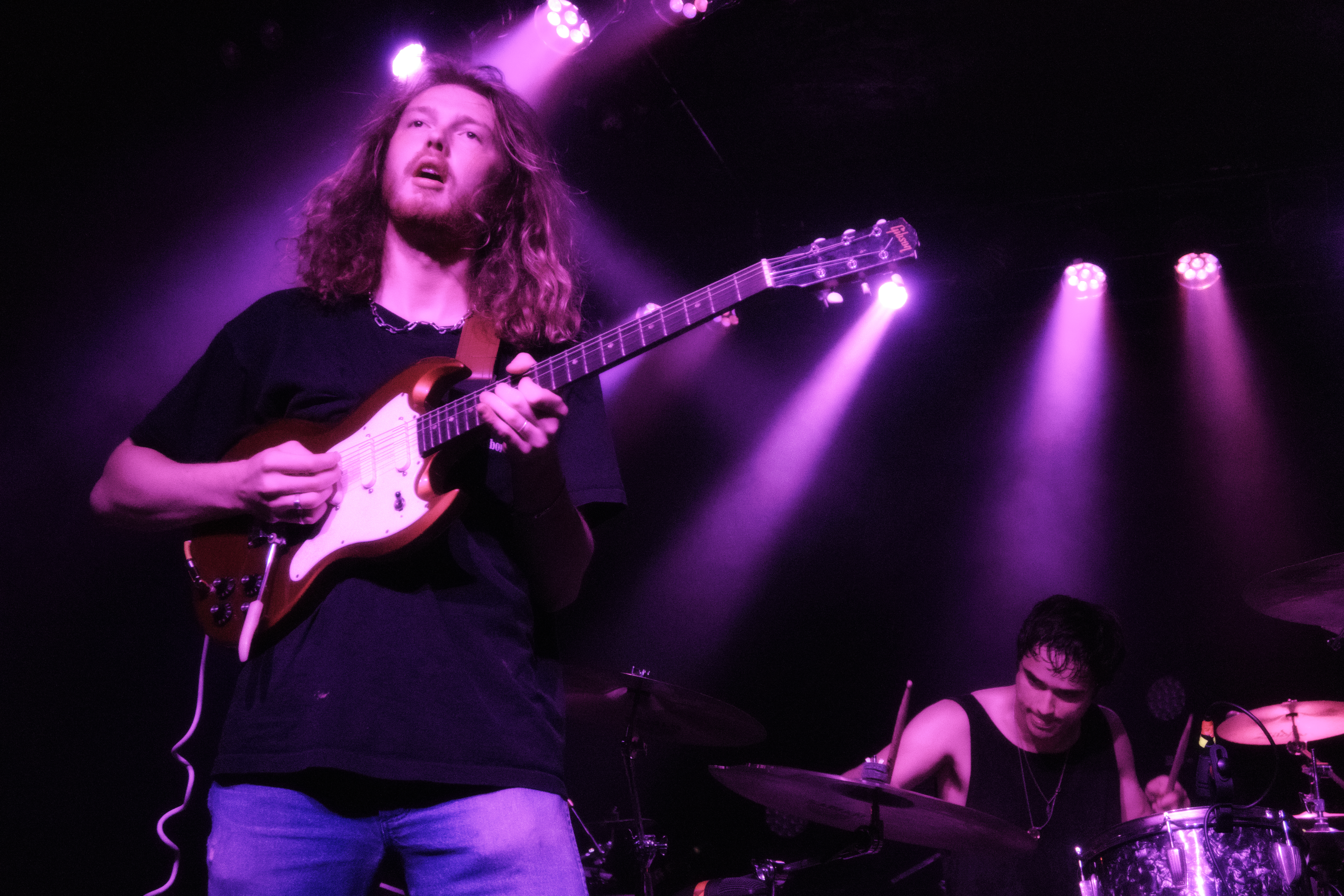
- Naked Giants performing at The Showbox in Seattle, Washington in October 2018

Background information
- Origin: Seattle, Washington, United States
- Genres: Rock and roll; psychedelic rock; grunge; post-punk
- Years active: 2014–present
- Label: New West Records
- Members: Grant Mullen; Gianni Aiello; Henry LaVallee
- Website: www.nakedgiants.com

Naked Giants are an American rock music group founded in 2014 in Seattle, Washington. The band comprises vocalist and guitarist Grant Mullen, bassist and vocalist Gianni Aiello, and drummer (and occasional vocalist) Henry LaVallee. After releasing their lo-fi EP R.I.P. in 2016, they were signed by New West Records. The band released their debut studio album SLUFF on March 30, 2018, to positive critical reviews. Naked Giants toured through 2018 and 2019 with indie rock band Car Seat Headrest. They released their second studio album The Shadow on 21 August 2020.

== History ==
=== 2014–2017: Formation and R.I.P. ===
Grant Mullen and Henry LaVallee met in pre-school. In their teenage years they took up practicing music together and discovered they had musical chemistry. At 17 or 18, the duo decided to pursue music together and create the band. Naked Giants had their first practice in August, 2014. Gianni was part of a synthpop band called Laser Fox at the time, playing bass for the group. LaVallee and Mullen discovered Aiello at a live performance at the Crocodile cafe in Seattle. According to Aiello, "they thought I looked really cool, and they liked my moves, and they said I could play the bass really well." He was then invited to perform with them in Mercer Island, and joined the group. They released their first single Easy Eating in 2016, followed by three more prior to the release of the R.I.P. EP, distributed via Miscreant Records. The EP was well received by Andi Villegas of North West Music Scene. After finishing second in the Sound Off! music competition in Emerald City, Naked Giants became a member of New West Records and started work on their debut studio album.

=== 2017–2020: SLUFF, touring, and Green Fuzz ===
In 2017, Naked Giants collaborated with fellow New Records signee Ron Gallo on his 7" single Sorry Not Everybody Is You/The Age of Information. Their debut album, SLUFF was produced by Steve Fisk, who had previously worked with Nirvana, Soundgarden, and Car Seat Headrest. On the direction for SLUFF, Mullen said "it's a smorgasbord of shit. Loud rock music, that's what it is." Aiello spoke of the project, "it's that kind of thing where you make something and you don't really know what it is, but you understand it later." Despite interpretations that SLUFF stands for South Lake Union Fuck Faces, Naked Giants state that is only one view. "Sluff" can also be "either slang for the black gunk that comes off your shoes when it snows in the winter, ... or what a snake does when it sheds its skin" according to different members.

The album was released on March 30, 2018, and included twelve tracks. The first single released off of the album was "TV", which was accompanied by a music video directed by Sean Downey and released on the New West Records YouTube channel. Their second single was "Everybody Thinks They Know (But No One Really Knows)", and the third single was the titular track "SLUFF". The album dabbles with blues on the song "Slow Dance II", and in themes of duality and gender identity on the closer track "Shredded Again." Naked Giants went on tour with Car Seat Headrest performing both their own songs and Car Seat Headrest's in a seven-man set. Their performance in Olympia, Washington was well-received and Billboard named their performance with Car Seat Headrest in Brooklyn one of their favorite live performances of the year. Grant Mullen said in July, 2018, that they may have 16 months of touring and promotion left still to do before a new album is released. On 25 January 2019, the group released the Green Fuzz E.P., including the songs Green Fuzz, That's Who's Really Pointing At Me, and an acoustic version of Everybody Thinks They Know (But No One Really Knows). According to Henry LaVallee, "The Green Fuzz EP concept was to give a few of our longer songs a platform to exist that would be something excellent to own as a 10". On 17 July 2019, Naked Giants released a music video for the song Green Fuzz with a plot revolving around three students attempting to solve the mystery of several missing students and a Green Fuzz monster. In 2018, Naked Giants stated that they are already working on demos and takes for a new album. In the interview for ANCHR Magazine, Aiello stated that they had already completed 9 demos for a sophomore album. Aiello said that the second studio album would try to refine what was done well on SLUFF and that the album was about "realizing ... where you are in the world and how you fit into [the] balance of oppression and privilege and how to navigate that and navigate your own anxiety of these things you internalize."

=== 2020-Present: The Shadow, second album ===
On 11 June 2020, Naked Giants released their lead single from their second studio album The Shadow produced by Chris Funk, with a socially distanced music video due to the COVID-19 pandemic. The song was described by the band as representing the "dance-the-stress-away attitude we’ve had since the band was formed" and that the song's lyrics are meant to represent the "big unanswered questions in our lives, like the mechanisms of privilege and oppression or the capitalist oxymoron of individualism and assimilation, and we’re pairing it all with a danceable backbeat to tell people it’s ok to get up off the couch and do something about it." They also describe The Shadow as "a much more honest album than SLUFF" about the "part of yourself that’s hard to confront and understand" and "facing that darkness and having the strength to bring it into the light." Aiello said that many of the songs on The Shadow had been brewing for a long time, and that they "leaned into our ’80s and ’90s influences for this record. We took a lot of inspiration from bands like Devo, The Cure, U2, Talking Heads, My Bloody Valentine, and The Fall, as well as our usual sources like Neil Young, Black Sabbath, and all that classic stuff." Aiello also said that Chris Funk was an important part of the creative process, suggesting taking away Henry's cymbals on some songs. In an interview with American Songwriter upon releasing their single The Shadow, the members stated they spent more of their time during the pandemic teaching children music. Their second album, The Shadow released on August 21, 2020.

Critics noted the album's more diverse sound including more stylistic influences from Mudhoney, and post-punk influences a la Joy Division on songs like Turns Blue, The Ripper, and Unpeeled. Other influences noted by critics were The Ramones and Talking Heads. The album has been received positively. Maeri Ferguson of No Depression notes that Turns Blue "is a standout, unexpectedly knocking the wind out of you with its silken vocals and air of solitude that feels fitting for a time of unprecedented loneliness and isolation," and that the trio "use their harmonies strategically, sometimes mono and hypnotic to work you into a trance, other times primal and deeply felt, like a long-awaited release of tension." Jeremy Lukens of Glide Magazine wrote that The Shadow was more melodic than SLUFF and, whilst having a "slightly overproduced pop sheen detracting from the band’s primal nature," that The Shadow "deftly blends Naked Giants’ influences of early-2000s garage rock with 1990s alternative. Lukens also found the eponymous song The Shadow to be the highlight of the album. Michael Rietmulder of The Seattle Times described the album as "glammy, synth-squiggling dance rock and a stoner rock leg-stretcher that sets up hazy, dream-pop send-off 'Song For When You Sleep' — all sprinkled across an album that never feels too scatterbrained." The Shadow made numerous Seattle music journalists and critics' year end lists for best 2020 Seattle albums.

== Discography ==
=== Studio albums ===
- SLUFF (March 30, 2018)
- The Shadow (August 21, 2020)
- Shine Away (October 4, 2024)

=== Extended plays ===
- R.I.P. (2016)
- Green Fuzz (2019)

=== Singles ===
- "Easy Eating" (2016)
- "Pyramids" (2016)
- "Ya Ya" (2016)
- "Surchin 4 U" (2016)
- "Sorry Not Everybody Is You" / "The Age of Information" (2017) with Ron Gallo.
- "TV" (2018)
- "Everybody Thinks They Know (But No One Really Knows)" (2018)
- "SLUFF" (2018)
- "Green Fuzz" / "That's Who's Really Pointing At Me" (2019)
- "Take a Chance" (2020)
- "High School (Don't Like Them)" (2020)
- "Turns Blue" (2020)
- "(God Damn!) What I Am" (2020)
- "Regular Guy" (2021)
- "Pirate Radio Queen" (2022)
- "Merry Christmas to You and Your Dog" (2023)
- "Apartment 3" (2024)
- "Bad Guys Win" (2024)
- "Did I Just Die" (2024)
