= Twin Fantasy =

Studio album by Car Seat Headrest
- Released: November 2, 2011
- Recorded: 2011
- Genres: Indie rock; lo-fi; alternative rock
- Length: 60:26
- Label: Self-released
- Producer: Will Toledo

Car Seat Headrest chronology
| My Back Is Killing Me Baby (2011) | Twin Fantasy (2011) | Monomania (2012) |

Twin Fantasy, later re-titled Twin Fantasy (Mirror to Mirror), is the sixth solo studio album by American indie rock musician Will Toledo, under his alias Car Seat Headrest. Since its release on November 2, 2011, the album has amassed an online cult following, with the internet forums 4chan and Reddit playing major roles in the album's initial success. A re-recording of the album was released via Matador Records on February 16, 2018.

== Background and recording ==
Writing for Twin Fantasy began in mid-2011 after Toledo transferred from Virginia Commonwealth University to the College of William and Mary due to feelings of isolation and anxiety. He specified in an interview with Uproxx that it was the first Car Seat Headrest album to be conceived of and written as a full album, rather than a collection of songs. This change in style had been a result of the writing process for "Beach Life-in-Death".

Twin Fantasy was performed and produced entirely by Toledo, and would feature a prominent use of lo-fi production, largely due to his lack of resources. The album's cover art was also created by Toledo, with liner notes art provided by independent comic artist Cate Wurtz, who had previously worked with Toledo on the artwork for 3, 4, and My Back is Killing Me Baby.

Twin Fantasy was initially released via the online music platform Bandcamp on November 2, 2011. Around a year after its release, the album was remastered by Toledo, with additional bass being added to most tracks. Upon its release, Toledo estimates the album was downloaded by around 100 people, but had since gone on to be downloaded over 33,000 times as of 2018.

== Music and lyrics ==
Toledo stated via Tumblr that Twin Fantasy is a concept album which explores a relationship he was in at the time.

"Beach Life-in-Death", the longest track on the album, clocks in at 12 minutes and 11 seconds and changes style multiple times throughout. The lyric sheet included with downloads separates the song into three parts. Toledo has noted that his main sources of inspiration for the album included Pink Floyd, of Montreal, Destroyer, and They Might Be Giants, along with various romantic poets he had been studying at the time.

The chorus from "Ana Ng" by They Might Be Giants was interpolated into "Cute Thing" with some minor changes. The outro of "Jugband Blues" by Pink Floyd was also interpolated in "High to Death" with some changes. However, this would be removed in future releases.

== Track listing ==
All tracks written and performed by Will Toledo.

| No. | Title | Length |
|---|---|---|
| 1. | "My Boy (Twin Fantasy)" | 2:49 |
| 2. | "Beach Life-in-Death" | 12:10 |
| 3. | "Stop Smoking" | 1:27 |
| 4. | "Sober to Death" | 5:03 |
| 5. | "Nervous Young Inhumans" | 4:14 |
| 6. | "Bodys" | 6:15 |
| 7. | "Cute Thing" | 5:21 |
| 8. | "High to Death" | 5:36 |
| 9. | "Famous Prophets (Minds)" | 10:20 |
| 10. | "Twin Fantasy (Those Boys)" | 6:28 |
| Total length: | | 59:43 |

=== Notes ===
- "Cute Thing" interpolates the They Might Be Giants song "Ana Ng" in its bridge.

== 2018 re-recording ==
A re-recording of Twin Fantasy was released on February 16, 2018, under the name Twin Fantasy (Face to Face). It is a complete full band re-recording and reworking of the original album, which was subsequently subtitled Mirror to Mirror after the release of the re-recorded album.
