= How to Leave Town =

EP by Car Seat Headrest
- Released: October 31, 2014
- Recorded: 2014
- Genres: Indie rock; lo-fi
- Length: 62:22
- Label: Self-released
- Producer: Will Toledo

Car Seat Headrest chronology
Disjecta Membra (2013)	How to Leave Town (2014)	Teens of Style (2015)

How to Leave Town is the third extended play by American musician Will Toledo, released under the alias Car Seat Headrest. It was self-published on Bandcamp on October 31, 2014. The EP would end up being Car Seat Headrest's final release as a solo project, and final independent release, as Toledo would expand Car Seat Headrest into a band and sign to Matador Records the next year.

Material for the EP came from demos Toledo initially discarded while writing Teens of Denial (2016), and the music blends the lo-fi, indie rock, and indietronica production styles featured on his prior releases. Despite its "album-sized" length, Toledo deemed How to Leave Town an EP since it "explores realms which might have otherwise gone untreaded" on Car Seat Headrest's albums.

== Background and release ==
Following the release and mixed reception of his eighth album, Nervous Young Man, Toledo began planning out what would become his follow-up album, Teens of Denial, with the intention of writing music that was more straightforward and easier to perform live. How to Leave Town originated from "Hey, Space Cadet (Beast Monster Thing in Space)", a song originally considered for Teens of Denial that Toledo liked enough to structure an EP around instead. Toledo noted that the EP's creation was spontaneous and had only been "consciously in the works" for a little over a month before release, and that many of the tracks from How to Leave Town originated from material Toledo "demoed and [then] forgot" while he was writing Teens of Denial.

In an interview with Uproxx, Toledo stated that he considered the EP to be a compilation of B-sides and outtakes conceptually, though not literally. The formation of the project as an EP was also inspired by Sufjan Stevens' 2010 hour-long EP, All Delighted People.

Toledo did not release much of the music on How to Leave Town online before the EP's release, except for two "obscure previews" Toledo uploaded to SoundCloud, but has since deleted. After release, an edited version of "America (Never Been)" was featured on the Luau Records compilation The Quad Dub as simply "America", along with "Culture", an unreleased song from the same time period as How to Leave Town and Teens of Denial.

== Composition ==
"Beast Monster Thing (Love isn't Love Enough)"
The second track from How to Leave Town. "Beast Monster Thing (Love isn't Love Enough)" features distorted guitars, synthesizer based melodies and lyrics describing Toledo's creative process.

How to Leave Town has been described as indie rock, synth-pop, and lo-fi, with critics noting the EP's less directly personal lyricism, as well as the project's borrowed influences from pop music. The first track, "The Ending of Dramamine" is the longest song on the EP at fourteen minutes, with the track making heavy use of synthesizers and unsteady guitars. Toledo noted that he had drawn inspiration from Frank Sinatra when writing the chord progression for the song, as well the Modest Mouse song "Dramamine", which the song was named after. In a track review for Pitchfork, Ian Cohen described the EP's second track, "Beast Monster Thing (Love isn't Love Enough)" as "giving listeners a direct line to [Toledo's] inner monologue", comparing the song's harsh lo-fi intro to Sparklehorse, and the works of artists from Saddle Creek Records and Elephant 6.

The third track, "Kimochi Warui (When? When? When? When? When? When? When?)" derives its title from the 1997 anime film, The End of Evangelion. Writing for Paste, Casey Epstein-Gross described the song as "atmospheric", "devastating", and "hopeless", noting that it "[evokes] the sensation of standing alone in a desert, on a field, inside a planetarium, looking up at the sheer magnitude of everything around you and feeling just so very, very small." "You're in Love with Me" is a more upbeat track, with Emily English of Campus Times describing its guitar and drum parts as the most reminiscent of Teens of Denial. The last track on the EP, "Hey, Space Cadet (Beast Monster Thing in Space)" originated directly as a scrapped demo from Teens of Denial, and features a returning refrain from the prior track "Beast Monster Thing."

== Legacy ==
How to Leave Town would serve as the final project that Toledo would self-release as Car Seat Headrest. After signing to Matador Records in 2015, Car Seat Headrest expanded into a three-piece band, with Toledo being joined by Andrew Katz and Jacob Bloom. Teens of Style, an album mostly made up of re-recorded tracks Toledo self-produced, was released as their label debut in 2015, followed by Teens of Denial, the album Toledo had been writing since 2013, in 2016.

== Track listing ==
All tracks are written by Will Toledo.

No.	Title	Length
1.	"The Ending of Dramamine"	14:17
2.	"Beast Monster Thing (Love isn't Love Enough) (Note: The original release of this EP has a sample of John Lennon saying "What are you doing?" as well as an interpolation of Clampdown by the Clash. It was removed in 2017 with the streaming release.)"	6:52
3.	"Kimochi Warui (When? When? When? When? When? When? When?)"	4:44
4.	"I-94 W (832 Mi)"	1:26
5.	"You're in Love with Me"	5:42
6.	"America (Never Been) (Note: This song was rerecorded and released as “America” as a bonus track for Teens of Denial, but was quickly removed.)"	7:15
7.	"I Want You to Know That I'm Awake / I Hope That You're Asleep (Note: Stylized as "I Want You to Know That I'm Awake/i Hope That You're Asleep" on streaming.)"	8:43
8.	"Is This Dust Really from the Titanic? (Note: On Bandcamp, this track is stylized in all lowercase, except for the word "Titanic".)"	1:57
9.	"Hey, Space Cadet (Beast Monster Thing in Space)"	11:26
Total length:		62:22

== Personnel ==
Credits adapted from Bandcamp.

- Will Toledo – music
- Degnan Smith – featured performer
- Andrew Snook – artwork
