= Teens of Style =

Compilation album / studio album by Car Seat Headrest
- Released: October 30, 2015
- Recorded: February 28 – June 7, 2015
- Genres: Indie rock, lo-fi
- Length: 46:47
- Label: Matador
- Producer: Will Toledo

Car Seat Headrest chronology
How to Leave Town (2014)	Teens of Style (2015)	Teens of Denial (2016)

Singles from Teens of Style
- 1. "No Passion" Released: July 22, 2015; 2. "Something Soon" Released: September 1, 2015; 3. "Times to Die" Released: October 6, 2015

Professional ratings
Aggregate scores
Source	Rating
AnyDecentMusic?	7.5/10
Metacritic	79/100
Review scores
Source	Rating
AllMusic	4/5 stars
The A.V. Club	A−
MusicOMH	5/5 stars
Pitchfork	8.1/10
Rolling Stone	4/5 stars

Teens of Style is the ninth studio album/a compilation album by American indie rock band Car Seat Headrest, released on October 30, 2015. It is their first album as a full band, and first release under Matador Records. Intended as an introductory compilation for new listeners, it features reworked, newly recorded versions of songs originally released between 2010 and 2012, with the addition of one new composition.

== Background and recording ==
From the description of the "No Passion" music video, Teens of Style is a collection of older Car Seat Headrest songs, rerecorded in 2015 to make a sonically expanded new release.

From Interview magazine, "At the time that I was originally recording the songs, I don't think I considered them to be the final versions, [...] They were just self-recorded and I wanted to do them properly at some point."

Speaking with Stereogum, Toledo said: "I’d had the idea for a while, including when I was originally recording them; it felt like the best I could do at the time, rather than something I’d really be happy with forever. That was part of the appeal with digital albums, is that they could feel less ‘official’, and I could mess with them long after their technical release date. I often went back and tweaked stuff on past albums I felt could be better, but I also wanted to do a more comprehensive overhaul of the best of it, to give it new life. And I'd always thought ‘studio’ when thinking of that, but by the time Matador came around I felt I was working well enough in the home environment to do the first album that way, and that's what ended up happening. Everything on Teens Of Style I recorded and produced myself. We got a professional, Abe Seiferth, to mix the drums and bass for Something Soon, but everything else is me. I figured this would be my last chance to do something that still sounded & felt like the ‘old’ Car Seat Headrest before we started doing bigger work."

Performers on the album include the live lineup from the time of Car Seat Headrest's signing with Matador; Will Toledo on guitar and vocals, Andrew Katz on drums, and Jacob Bloom on bass.

== Accolades ==
Publication	Accolade	Year	Rank
Stereogum	The 50 Best Albums of 2015	2015	39
Rolling Stone	The 50 Best Albums of 2015	2015	30

== Track listing ==
All tracks are written by Will Toledo.

No.	Title	Original release(s)	Length
1.	"Sunburned Shirts"	Sunburned Shirts EP (2010); My Back Is Killing Me Baby (Note: The previous album 5 was combined with Sunburned Shirts to make My Back Is Killing Me Baby. Some songs from both originals were removed, and the original albums were delisted.) (2011)	4:05
2.	"The Drum"	My Back Is Killing Me Baby	3:57
3.	"Something Soon"	My Back Is Killing Me Baby	4:20
4.	"No Passion"	My Back Is Killing Me Baby	2:50
5.	"Times to Die"	Monomania (2012)	6:50
6.	"Psst, Teenagers, Take Off Your Clo (Note: Stylized in all lowercase.)"	3 (2010)	1:00
7.	"Strangers"	My Back Is Killing Me Baby	5:39
8.	"Maud Gone"	Monomania	5:58
9.	"Los Borrachos (I Don't Have Any Hope Left, But the Weather is Nice)"	Monomania	6:23
10.	"Bad Role Models, Old Idols Exhumed (Psst, Teenagers, Put Your Clothes Back O) (Note: The text in the parentheses are in lowercase.)"		1:54
11.	"Oh! Starving"	3; Starving While Living EP (2012) (Note: Known on streaming as “Living while Starving.”)	3:51
Total length:			46:52

== Personnel ==
Car Seat Headrest

- Will Toledo – all vocals and instruments except:
- Andrew Katz – drums
- Jacob Bloom – bass

Additional musicians

- Amanda Schiano di Cola – trumpet (tracks 5, 10)
- Eleni Govetas – saxophone (track 8)

Production

- Will Toledo – production, mixing
- Abe Seiferth – additional mixing (track 3)
- Degnan Smith – East Coast recordings, unsolicited vocals
- Stewart Piccolo – additional dialogues
- JJ Golden – mastering
- Max Wedner – illustration
- Mike Zimmerman – design and colour

== Charts ==
Chart (2016)	Peak position
Belgian Albums (Ultratop Flanders)	117
US Heatseeker Albums	19
