= Faces from the Masquerade =

Live album by Car Seat Headrest
- Released: December 8, 2023
- Recorded: March 28–30, 2022
- Venue: Brooklyn Steel
- Genre: Indie rock
- Length: 84:35 (digital); 91:56 (vinyl)
- Label: Matador
- Producer: John McRae

Car Seat Headrest chronology
Making a Door Less Open (2020)	Faces from the Masquerade (2023)	The Scholars (2025)

Singles from Faces from the Masquerade
- 1. "Bodys (Live at Brooklyn Steel)" Released: October 18, 2023

Faces from the Masquerade is the third live album by American indie rock band Car Seat Headrest, released on December 8, 2023 by Matador Records. The album was recorded during the band's three-night concert residency at Brooklyn Steel in March 2022. The title comes from the fact that audience members were asked to wear masks at the shows due to the COVID-19 pandemic, and that the band's lead singer, Will Toledo, performed the concerts in a custom gas mask and hazmat suit. Stereogum noted that many of the songs on the album were "reimagined and rejiggered" from the studio versions.

== Track listing ==
All tracks are written by Will Toledo, except where noted.

No.	Title	Writer(s)	Length
1.	"Crows"		8:16
2.	"Weightlifters"		5:22
3.	"Fill in the Blank"		4:54
4.	"Hymn"		4:04
5.	"Hollywood"	Andrew Katz, Will Toledo	3:53
6.	"Bodys"		6:18
7.	"Something Soon"		4:32
8.	"1937 State Park"		4:39
9.	"Sober to Death"		5:58
10.	"Drunk Drivers/Killer Whales"		7:26
11.	"It's My Child (I'll Do What I Like)"	Ethan Ives	6:07
12.	"Beach Life-In-Death"		13:34
13.	"Deadlines"		9:18
Total length:			84:35

Vinyl edition (with bonus track)

Side A
No.	Title	Length
1.	"Crows"	8:16
2.	"Weightlifters"	5:22
3.	"Fill in the Blank"	4:54
4.	"Hymn"	4:04

Side B
No.	Title	Writer(s)	Length
5.	"Hollywood"	Andrew Katz, Will Toledo	3:53
6.	"Bodys"		6:18
7.	"Something Soon"		4:32
8.	"1937 State Park"		4:39
9.	"Sober to Death"		5:58

Side C
No.	Title	Writer(s)	Length
10.	"Drunk Drivers/Killer Whales"		7:26
11.	"It's My Child (I'll Do What I Like)"	Ethan Ives	6:07
12.	"Can't Cool Me Down"		7:35

Side D
No.	Title	Length
13.	"Beach Life-In-Death"	13:34
14.	"Deadlines"	9:18
Total length:		91:56

== Personnel ==
Credits adapted from AllMusic.

Car Seat Headrest

- Will Toledo – vocals; guitar on "Sober to Death"
- Ethan Ives – guitar, backing vocals; lead vocals on "It's My Child (I'll Do What I Like)"
- Seth Dalby – bass
- Andrew Katz – drums; vocals on "Hollywood"
- Ben Roth – keyboards

Guests

- Bartees Strange – additional guitar on "Can't Cool Me Down" (vinyl only)
- Jordyn Blakely – tambourine on "Can't Cool Me Down" (vinyl only)

Technical

- John McRae – producer, recording engineer, mixing
- Scott Sedillo – mastering
- Emilio Herce – photography
- Mike Zimmerman – design
