= Car Seat Headrest =

American indie rock band

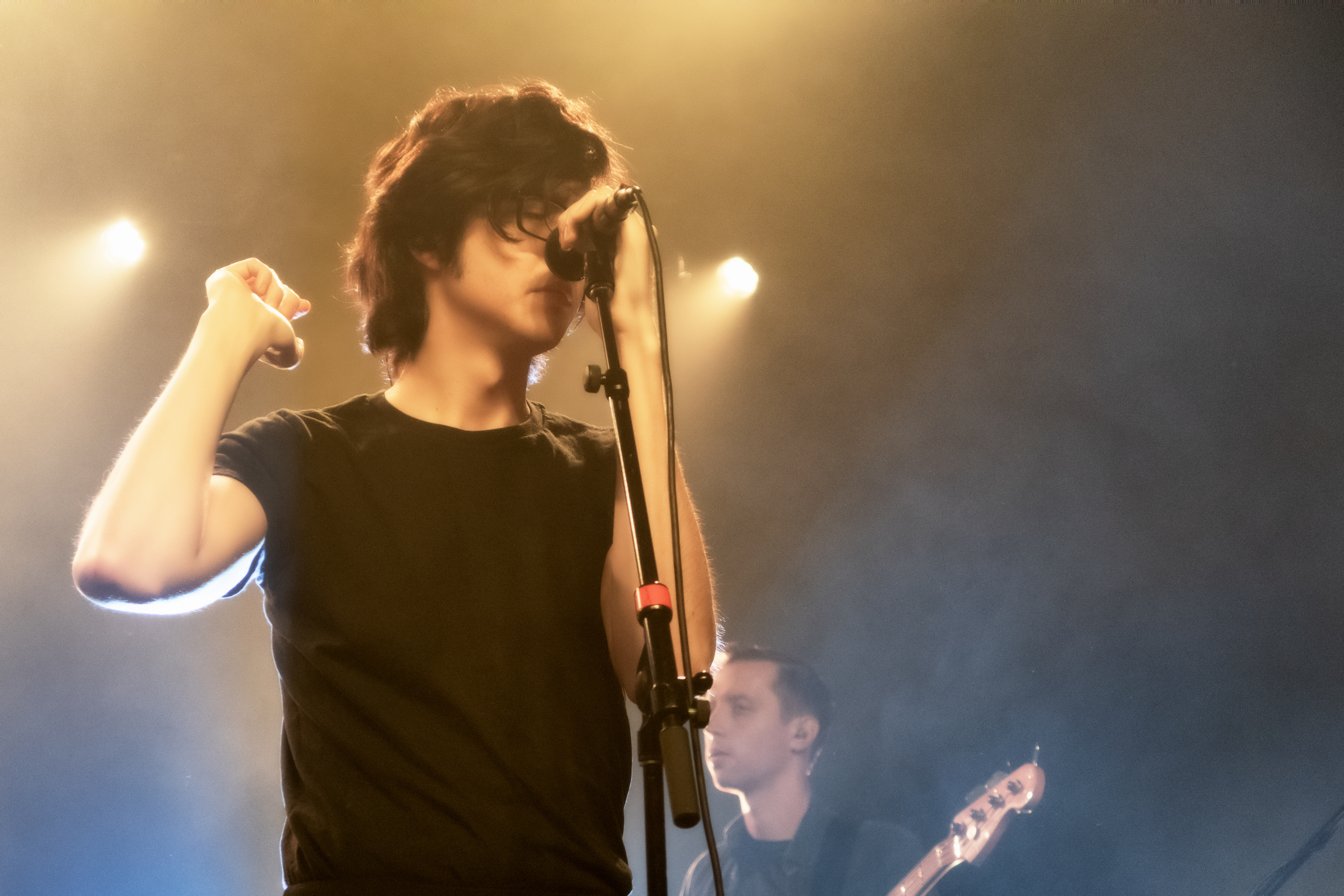
- Will Toledo and Seth Dalby performing as part of Car Seat Headrest at The Showbox in Seattle, Washington, in October 2018

Background information
- Origin: Leesburg, Virginia, U.S.
- Genres: Indie rock; lo-fi
- Works: Car Seat Headrest discography
- Years active: 2010–present
- Label: Matador
- Members: Will Toledo; Ethan Ives; Andrew Katz; Seth Dalby
- Past members: Jacob Bloom
- Website: www.carseatheadrest.com

Car Seat Headrest is an American indie rock band formed in Leesburg, Virginia, and currently located in Seattle, Washington. The band consists of Will Toledo (vocals, guitar, piano, synthesizers), Ethan Ives (guitar, bass, backing vocals), Seth Dalby (bass), and Andrew Katz (drums, percussion, backing vocals).

Beginning as a solo recording project by Toledo in 2010, Car Seat Headrest self-released 12 projects on the music platform Bandcamp between 2010 and 2014 before signing to Matador Records in 2015. They began touring and recording as a full band the same year, and have released 8 albums as a band, including studio albums, live albums, and re-recorded albums from across the band's discography.

== History ==
=== 2010–2014: Lo-fi and solo releases, from 1 to How to Leave Town ===
Car Seat Headrest began as the solo project of singer/songwriter and multi-instrumentalist Will Toledo (born William Barnes) shortly after he graduated high school. Toledo had previously released music under other aliases, The 63rd Fret and Nervous Young Men, and played in a band in high school called Mr. Yay Okay, but after struggling to establish an audience, he decided to change tactics, choosing to try and release more experimental songs anonymously. Toledo chose the name "Car Seat Headrest" as he would often record the vocals to his early albums in the back seat of his family's car for privacy. He recorded vocals through his laptop's built-in microphone, not buying a separate one for the first three years of the project, and used the free audio applications Audacity and GarageBand.

Throughout the summer of 2010, Toledo released his first four albums under the Car Seat Headrest name: 1, 2, 3, and 4. 1 and 2 incorporated less traditional song structures, based around samples and stream-of-consciousness lyrics, whereas 3 and 4 would begin to cement his lo-fi indie rock style. Following the numbered albums, Toledo began attending classes at Virginia Commonwealth University, releasing the Sunburned Shirts EP during his first semester. The Sunburned Shirts EP was later semi-combined with his fifth LP, 5 (now removed from their Bandcamp), to create his first titled album, My Back Is Killing Me Baby, released in March 2011. Songs culled from 5 and Sunburned Shirts were moved to the B-sides compilation album Little Pieces of Paper with "No" Written on Them.

After a difficult and lonely semester at VCU, Toledo transferred to the College of William & Mary, where he would release his next project, Twin Fantasy, a concept album centering around a relationship he was in at the time. Twin Fantasy was followed by 2012's Monomania, which is a spiritual successor to Twin Fantasy, and the Living While Starving EP, also known as Starving While Living.

Around this time, Toledo began performing live shows with fellow students Adrian Wood, Austin Ruhf, and Christian Northover, recording and releasing a short live album in July 2013 entitled Live at WCWM: Car Seat Headrest at the university's studio. Toledo released his next full length project the following month, a two-hour-long double album entitled Nervous Young Man, described on its Bandcamp page as "a collection of songs written between ages 17 and 21". Three of the songs, and the title of the album, were taken from his high school solo project, Nervous Young Men, but had been heavily reworked and re-recorded. Released alongside Nervous Young Man, for those who paid $5 or more, was the outtakes compilation album Disjecta Membra.

Toledo's final solo release was 2014's How to Leave Town, an hour-long EP with rock and electronic instrumentation, and more ambitious song structures. In the spring of 2014, he also produced an EP by indie rock band Gold Connections (led by friend and fellow WCWM DJ Will Marsh), which was released by Fat Possum Records in 2017.

=== 2015–2017: Matador Records, Teens of Style and Teens of Denial ===
Car Seat Headrest playing at The Sinclair, in Cambridge, Massachusetts (September 2016):

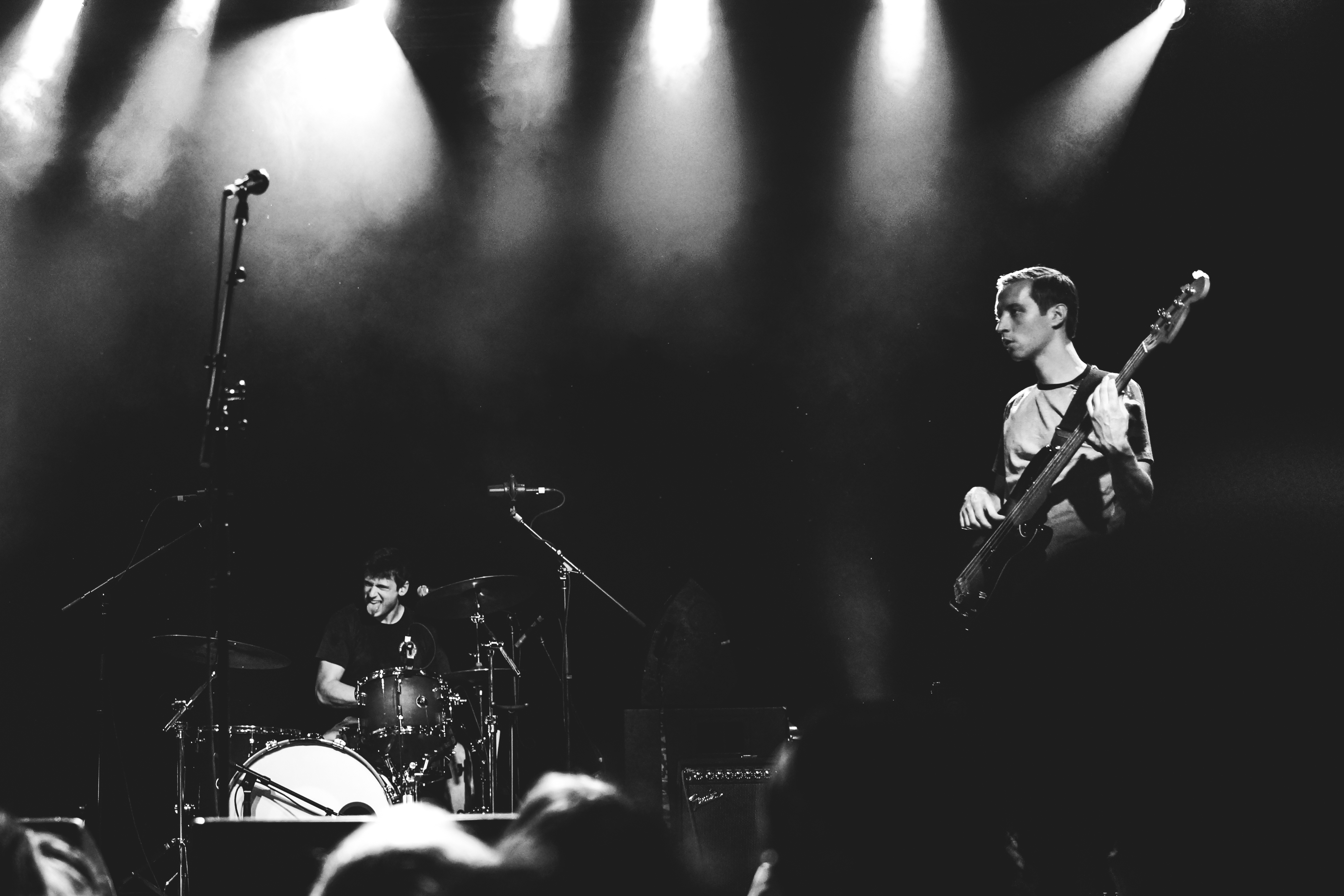
Andrew Katz (drums) and Seth Dalby (bass)

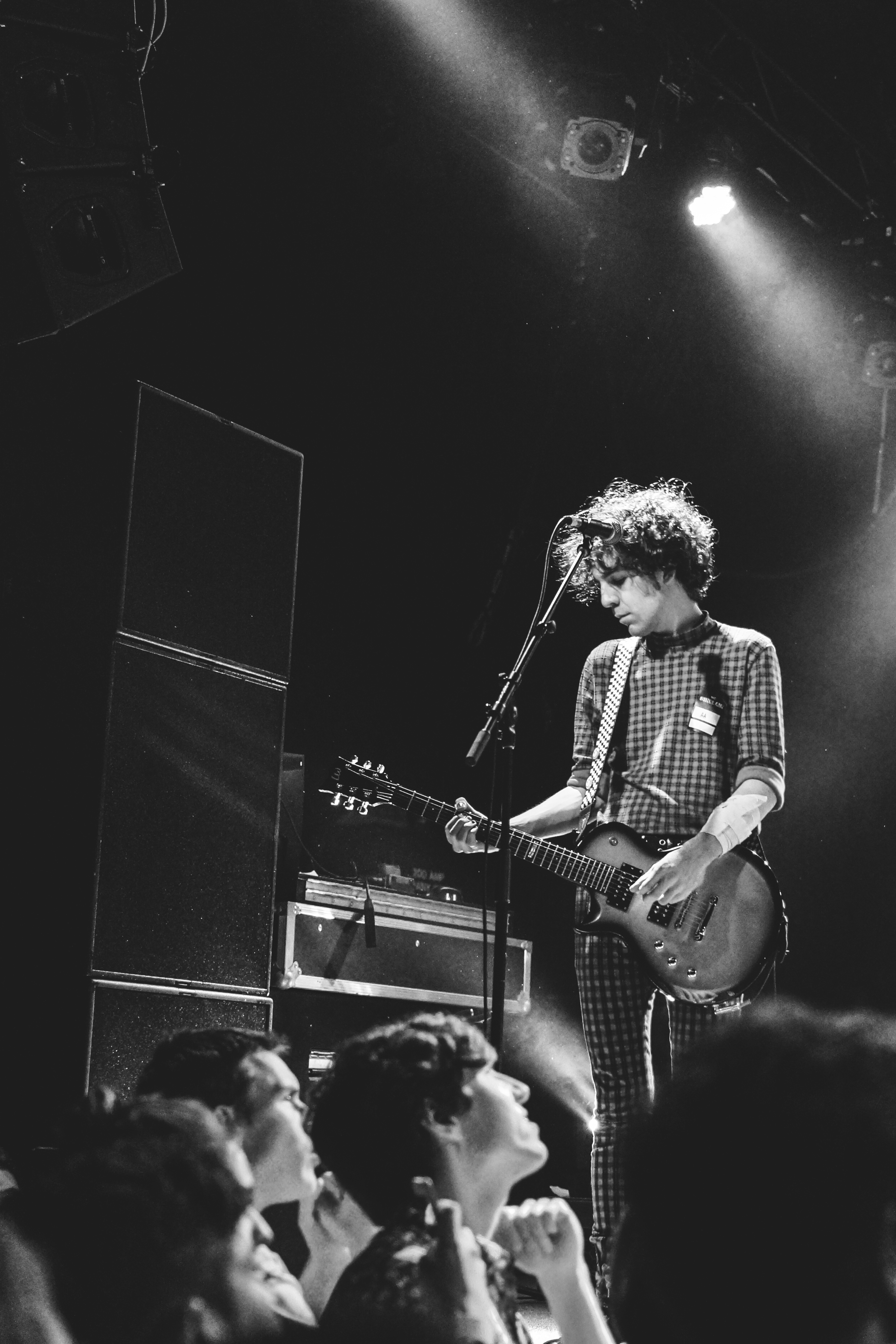
Ethan Ives

In September 2015, Car Seat Headrest announced on Facebook that they had signed an album deal with Matador Records. Toledo, who had recently graduated and moved to Seattle, recruited bassist Jacob Bloom and drummer Andrew Katz through Craigslist to record and tour his next album. The next month, Car Seat Headrest released the compilation album Teens of Style, consisting of re-recorded material from Toledo's solo discography and was their first record to not be self-released exclusively via Bandcamp. Shortly after the album's release, Bloom left the group to attend medical school and was replaced by bassist Ethan Ives, who met the band at an open mic.

Ives played bass on most of the recordings for the band's following release, but later switched to guitar, with Seth Dalby taking over on bass. Ives and Dalby would subsequently be cemented in these positions during live shows and future releases. The new album, created with traditional studio processes, Teens of Denial, was released on May 20, 2016.

In August 2017, Car Seat Headrest released an alternate mix of their single, "War Is Coming (If You Want It)" through Bandcamp for one day, with profits going to the Transgender Law Center. The original mix of the track was released ten days later.

On December 13, 2017, the band released a re-recorded version of "Beach Life-In-Death", the second track on Twin Fantasy, through Spotify without prior announcement. This sparked fan rumours that the album would be re-recorded and released the following year. On December 27, 2017, an Amazon listing detailing a re-recorded version of Twin Fantasy was found by fans, and subsequently uploaded to the Car Seat Headrest subreddit. This was followed up by a listing on SRCVinyl.com with the date February 16, 2018.

=== 2018–2019: Twin Fantasy (Face to Face) and Commit Yourself Completely ===
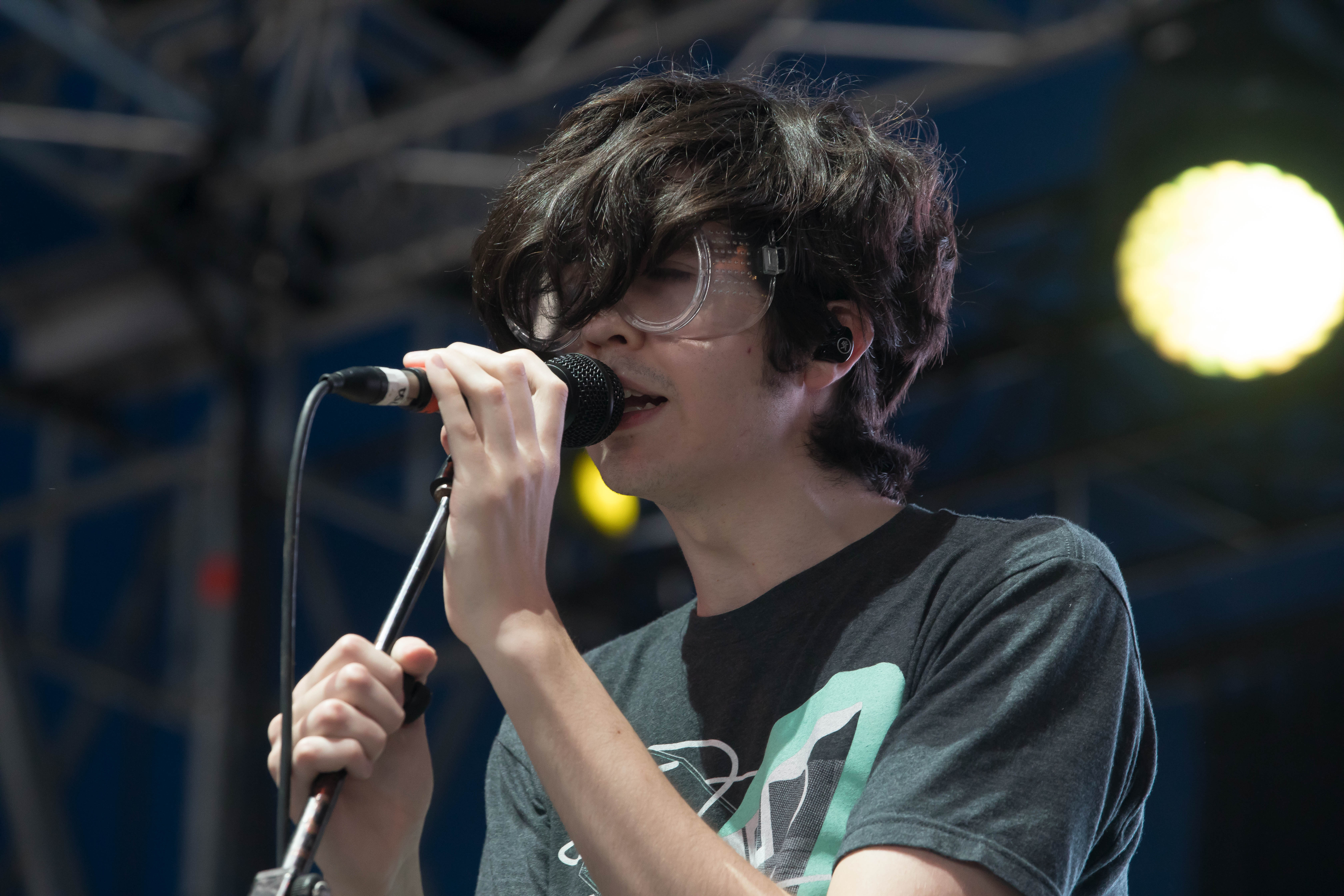
Will Toledo performing as Car Seat Headrest in Australia, 2018

On January 9, 2018, Matador Records formally announced the release of the re-recording, entitled Twin Fantasy (Face to Face), alongside a re-release of the original album. Twin Fantasy (Face to Face) was released via Matador on February 16. The original, which has been re-titled Twin Fantasy (Mirror to Mirror), was released on vinyl as a part of Record Store Day on April 21. On February 15, 2018, the band released a cover of "Fallen Horses" by Smash Mouth, who had previously covered "Something Soon" (from 2011's My Back Is Killing Me Baby). Around the same time, Car Seat Headrest began touring with fellow Seattle-based band Naked Giants as a part of the group's expanded live lineup. Toledo also produced and featured on Midnight by Stef Chura.

The band tested new material at various live shows in December 2018, debuting the tracks "Weightlifters", "Hollywood", "Stop Lying To Me", and "You Know There's Someone Out There", soon followed by "Can't Cool Me Down" in February and March 2019 performances.

On June 12, 2019, Car Seat Headrest announced a new live album titled Commit Yourself Completely, featuring official recordings of performances from the Twin Fantasy tour from 2018. It was released the following week on June 17.

=== 2020–2022: Making a Door Less Open and Faces from the Masquerade ===
On February 26, 2020, Car Seat Headrest announced their first studio album consisting of wholly new material since 2016's Teens of Denial, Making a Door Less Open. This announcement coincided with the release of "Can't Cool Me Down", the first single and second track off the album, and a release date of May 1, 2020. It marks a stylistic divergence from previous material, Toledo describing the album as containing elements of EDM, hip hop, futurism, doo-wop, soul and rock and roll. Three more singles were released to promote the album between March and April of that year: "Martin", "Hollywood" and "There Must Be More Than Blood". The release also coincided with the introduction of Trait, an alternative persona of Toledo's, featured prominently wearing a modified gas mask with blinking LED lights for eyes, and floppy, rabbit-like ears. The character had originally been created for the group's "comedic" side project, 1 Trait Danger, featuring Toledo alongside drummer Andrew Katz.

Making a Door Less Open was released with three separate versions across different formats: vinyl, CD and streaming, each with variations in track-list and specific musical elements. The album received a mixed reaction from fans, who pointed out the many divergences from the band's previous works, but received an overall score of 77 on review aggregate site Metacritic. Toledo noted that he and the band were working on a companion album for their latest release, while also looking for ways to improve the Trait mask to incorporate it into live performances. Shortly after the album's release, Ethan Ives released his debut solo album, Life for Cowards, under the name Toy Bastard. Due to the 2020 COVID-19 pandemic, the band's planned North American tour was cancelled, with shows later being rescheduled to the spring of 2022.

In 2021, Toledo produced the album My Head Hz by Naked Days, with Andrew Katz and Seth Dalby credited for providing drums and bass respectively. On June 22, 2021, Car Seat Headrest released two EPs: MADLO: Influences, a collection of four covers, including one of Kate Bush's Running Up That Hill, and MADLO: Remixes, consisting of five remixed versions of tracks from Making a Door Less Open. In the same year, Toledo produced the album How to Drive a Bus by New Jersey–based band I've Made Too Much Pasta. Katz is also credited alongside Toledo for mastering the album.

In April 2022, Toledo was diagnosed with COVID-19 while on tour, resulting in many of the band's performances being rescheduled, and later cancelled outright. Toledo later revealed he had developed a histamine intolerance as a result of Long COVID.

On October 12, 2023, Car Seat Headrest released a double A-side single with the Beths in support of Death Cab for Cutie and The Postal Service's 2023–2024 joint tour, covering "We Looked Like Giants" for the single. One week later, the band announced their second full-length live album, Faces from the Masquerade, featuring recordings from their residency at Brooklyn Steel during their 2022 tour. The album released on December 8.

=== 2023–present: The Scholars, Joe's Story, and upcoming fifteenth studio album ===
Recording for a new Car Seat Headrest studio album began in early 2023 at the Temple of the Trees studio in Seattle. In 2024, the band also began returning to live performances, performing their first live show in two years at the Woodland Park Zoo in June. Ethan Ives' second solo album under the alias Toy Bastard, The War, was released on July 15, 2024, followed by a music video for the song "Missing Kid". In October, Toledo announced that recording and mixing for the album had completed to the band's Patreon subscribers.

On February 18, 2025, the band officially began the rollout for their next studio album, which began with the Car Seat Headrest website re-designed to resemble a "basic Geocities site from the 90s". The site was made up of pages for academic subjects, with each page hosting a riddle or problem, that when solved, played a part of an unreleased song, with new puzzles being released regularly. The puzzles concluded on February 28, with the hidden "Computer Lab" riddle revealing the full cover art for the new album, The Scholars, and the full lyrics and audio to the album's lead single, "Gethsemane", which released digitally on March 4, shortly after it premiered on BBC Radio 6.

Starting on May 12, 2026 fans began receiving early copies of Teen of Denial (Joe's Story), a reimagining of Teens of Denial for its 10-year anniversary, alongside letters from Matador and Toledo. The album was released on May 20, 2026, featuring alternative versions of the original tracks, as well as entirely new material. In a statement on social media about the changes made to Teens of Denial on Joe's Story, Katz stated that a new studio album was in the works.

== Style ==
AllMusic biographer Mark Deming wrote that Car Seat Headrest created "moody and introspective lo-fi pop tunes that are melodic but structurally ambitious at once". Writing for Pitchfork, Jeremy Gordon stated that on Teens of Denial, "Will Toledo reaffirms that he is ahead of the pack as an imaginative singer-songwriter, capable of crafting dynamic indie rock." Ian Cohen of Pitchfork also described Toledo's music as "dense, confounding music that most often captures the giddy thrill of having access to recording equipment, of finally putting a sound to the voice in your head." Rolling Stone described Making a Door Less Open as "an immersive and adventurous album that sounds polished, but never slick, a well-executed experiment in cross-genre pollination that heightens Toledo's best songwriting impulses." Toledo has been open about his musical influences, which include, but are not limited to: Radiohead, the Beatles, the Beach Boys, Leonard Cohen, David Bowie, the Monkees, R.E.M., Nirvana, Green Day, the Who, Pavement, Kendrick Lamar, Daniel Johnston, Sufjan Stevens, Destroyer, Guided by Voices, Frank Ocean and They Might Be Giants.

== Members ==
=== Current members ===
- Will Toledo – vocals, guitar, keyboards (2010–present); bass, drums (2010–2014)
- Andrew Katz – drums, backing vocals (2014–present)
- Ethan Ives – bass guitar (2015–2016); guitar, backing vocals (2016–present); vocals (2020–present)
- Seth Dalby – bass guitar (2016–present; touring 2011–2012); backing vocals (2024–present)

=== Former members ===
- Jacob Bloom – bass guitar (2014–2015)

=== Touring members ===
- Will Marsh (of Gold Connections) – guitar, drums (2011–2012)
- Nora Knight – guitar, drums, backing vocals (2011–2012) (Note: Nora Knight provided vocals for "Misheard Lyrics" from Monomania (2012))
- Adrian Wood – guitar, backing vocals (2012–2014)
- Austin Ruhf – bass guitar, backing vocals, cello (2012–2014)
- Christian Northover – drums (2012–2014)
- Grant Mullen – guitar, backing vocals (2016, 2018–2019)
- Gianni Aiello – guitar, keyboards, backing vocals (2016, 2018–2019)
- Henry LaVallee – additional percussion (2016, 2018–2019)
- Ben Roth – keyboards (2022–present)

== Discography ==
=== Studio albums ===
==== As a solo project ====
- 1 (2010)
- 2 (2010)
- 3 (2010)
- 4 (2010)
- My Back Is Killing Me Baby (2011) (Note: Originally released as 5, but was re-released with an updated tracklist and new title in late 2011.)
- Twin Fantasy (2011) (reissued in 2018 as "Twin Fantasy (Face to Face)")
- Monomania (2012)
- Nervous Young Man (2013)

==== As a band ====
- Teens of Style (2015)
- Teens of Denial (2016)
- Twin Fantasy (Face to Face) (2018)
- Making a Door Less Open (2020)
- The Scholars (2025)
- Teen of Denial (Joe's Story) (2026)

=== Extended plays ===
- Sunburned Shirts (2010) (Note: Sunburned Shirts was deleted from Bandcamp in 2011. The songs from the EP were moved to Little Pieces Of Paper With "No" Written On Them and My Back Is Killing Me Baby.)
- Living While Starving (2012) (Note: Titled Living While Starving on streaming services.)
- How to Leave Town (2014)
- MADLO: Influences (2021)
- MADLO: Remixes (2021)

=== Live albums ===
- Live at WCWM: Car Seat Headrest (2013)
- Spotify Sessions (2016)
- Commit Yourself Completely (2019)
- Faces from the Masquerade (2023)

=== Compilation albums ===
- Little Pieces Of Paper With "No" Written On Them (2010) (Note: Re-released in late 2011, adding some songs that were removed from My Back Is Killing Me Baby and Sunburned Shirts.)
- Disjecta Membra (2013)
