= Teens of Denial =

2016 studio album by Car Seat Headrest

Studio album by Car Seat Headrest
- Released: May 20, 2016
- Recorded: 2015—2016
- Studio: Soundhouse (Seattle)
- Genre: Indie rock
- Length: 70:07
- Label: Matador
- Producer: Steve Fisk

Car Seat Headrest chronology
Teens of Style (2015)	Teens of Denial (2016)	Twin Fantasy (Face to Face) (2018)

Singles from Teens of Denial
- 1. "Vincent" Released: February 23, 2016; 2. "Drunk Drivers/Killer Whales" Released: March 24, 2016; 3. "Fill in the Blank" Released: April 11, 2016; 4. "Drunk Drivers/Killer Whales (Single Version)" Released: December 2, 2016; 5. "Unforgiving Girl (She's Not An)" Released: April 19, 2017

Teens of Denial is the tenth studio album by American indie rock band Car Seat Headrest, released on May 20, 2016 through Matador Records. The album is the band's first to be recorded in a studio, is the first of two albums to be recorded with an outside producer, and serves as their first album of newly written material for Matador, following their compilation album Teens of Style (2015).

The album was re-recorded with minor changes, and released on May 20, 2026 as Teen of Denial (Joe's Story).

== Background ==
Writing for Teens of Denial began in 2013, shortly after the release of Car Seat Headrest's eighth album, Nervous Young Man. Due to the previous album's length and complexity, lead singer and songwriter Will Toledo decided to focus on writing music that was more straightforward and easier to perform live. Toledo would go on to describe Teens of Denial as a bildungsroman, adding that, "I wrote it during a period in my life where I was not feeling a lot of love. Its tone and content reflect that. I made it because that's what I do – records have always marked the various phases of my life, and I needed to get out of this one, so I needed to make a record." The album was heavily influenced by Toledo's time in college at The College of William and Mary in Williamsburg, Virginia, but also drew influence from the life of Frank Sinatra and Ernest Becker's 1973 book, The Denial of Death.

In an interview with Uproxx, Toledo noted that it took two years to finish writing the album, as he wanted the songs to flow together coherently. Outtakes from this period were released on the 2014 EP, How to Leave Town.

== Release ==
In a November 2015 interview with Billboard, Toledo stated that the band's 2015 album Teens of Style would be followed by Teens of Denial, which he indicated would be their first to feature an outside producer and a "totally different" sound. On February 23, 2016, the lead single from Teens of Denial, "Vincent", was released, along with an accompanying music video. On March 24, Toledo announced a May 20 release date for the album and premiered the album's second single, "Drunk Drivers/Killer Whales".

=== Recall ===
On May 13, 2016, Matador Records recalled the entire initial compact disc and vinyl print runs of the album following the denial of permission to use lyrics from The Cars' "Just What I Needed" in the song "Just What I Needed/Not Just What I Needed". It was the first time in the label's history that they had recalled a record. The recalled copies were destroyed at the label's warehouse using a garbage truck compactor.

Car Seat Headrest and Matador Records had believed that they had secured the proper approval from The Cars' publisher to include the interpolation of "Just What I Needed" in "Just What I Needed/Not Just What I Needed" and had moved forward with pressing copies of Teens of Denial with the song. However, on May 10, 2016, Cars singer and songwriter Ric Ocasek denied permission to use elements of "Just What I Needed" after discovering that Toledo had changed a line from the original lyrics.

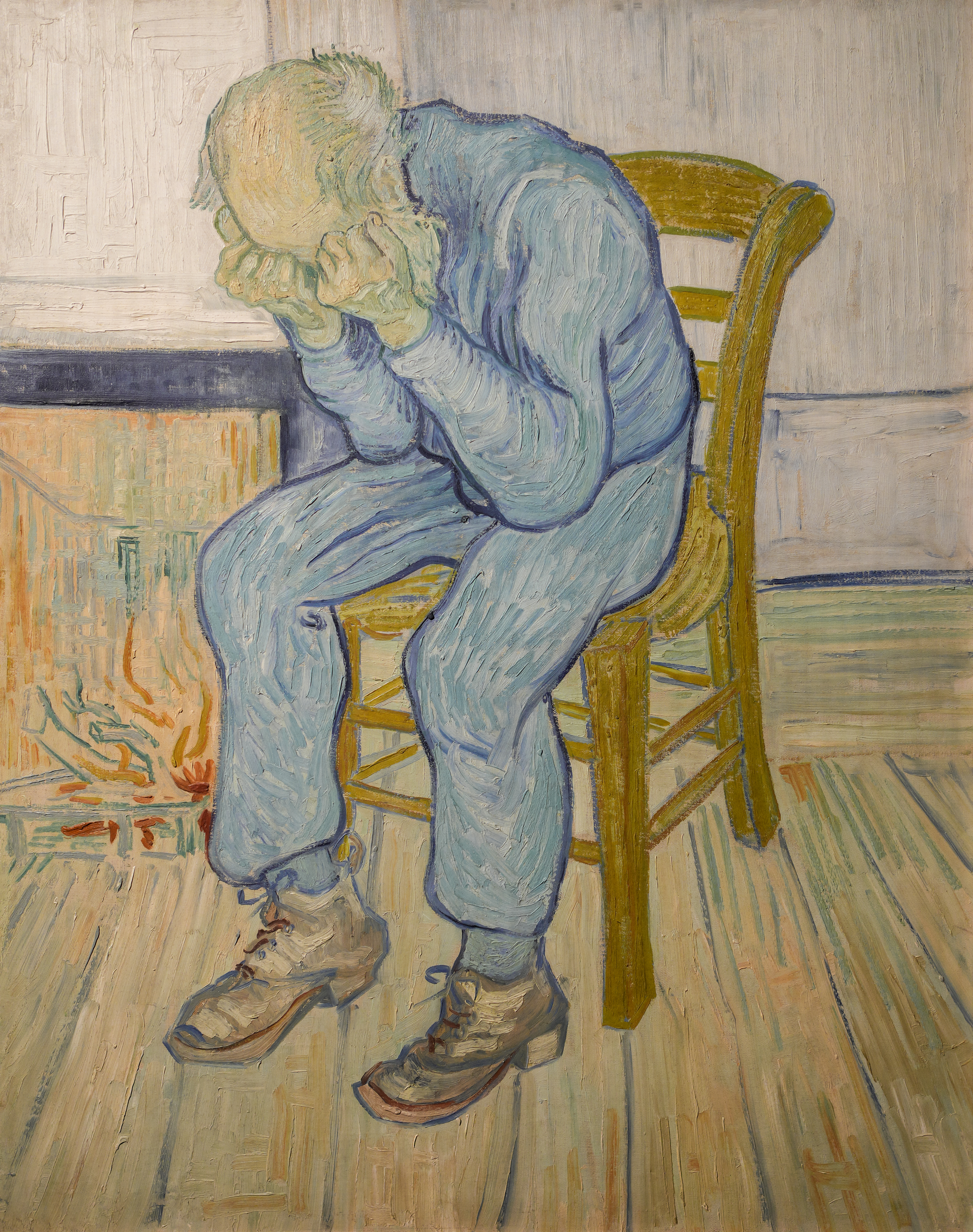
At Eternity's Gate, the portrait referenced in the line "They got a portrait by van Gogh on the Wikipedia page for clinical depression" from the song "Vincent"

Toledo recorded a new version of the song, titled "Not What I Needed", which removed the elements from "Just What I Needed" and was inserted in the revised track list of the album, adding a reversed sample of "Something Soon" from Car Seat Headrest's previous album, Teens of Style, and a recording of an interview Toledo did with a German radio station. The digital release of Teens of Denial was unaffected by the recall and included the new song, while the physical release was delayed until July.

== Critical reception ==
Professional ratings
Aggregate scores
Source	Rating
AnyDecentMusic?	8.0/10
Metacritic	86/100
Review scores
Source	Rating
AllMusic	4/5 stars
The Austin Chronicle	4/5 stars
The A.V. Club	A
Mojo	4/5 stars
NME	4/5
Pitchfork	8.5/10
Rolling Stone	4/5 stars
Spin	7/10
Uncut	8/10
Vice (Expert Witness)	A

Teens of Denial holds a score of 86 out of 100 on the online review aggregate site Metacritic, indicating "universal acclaim". David Brusie of The A.V. Club wrote that the repeated "exercise in tension and release" throughout the record "is essential to Teens of Denial's blistering greatness", concluding that "Toledo seems to be saying, buckle in; I'm taking you somewhere exciting. Trust him." Mark Deming of AllMusic found "real and powerful wit" in the album's songs and stated that Toledo "has created something like a novel after previously offering us short stories, and it's a piece of rough-hewn brilliance." In a "Best New Music" review for Pitchfork, Jeremy Gordon noted "even with the bigger budget and brighter environs, Toledo's underriding DIY sensibility comes through", adding that, "there’s an honest reckoning with what his wallowing has led to, and rapturous exhortation when logic alone cannot solve a problem" in regard to the album's themes and lyrics. NME critic Alex Flood called Teens of Denial "the work of a precocious talent."

=== Accolades ===
Publication	Accolade	Year	Rank	Ref.
American Songwriter	Top 50 Albums of 2016	2016	36	
The A.V. Club	The A.V. Club's Top 50 Albums of 2016	2016	19	
Consequence of Sound	Top 50 Albums of 2016	2016	18	
NME	NME's Albums of the Year 2016	2016	45	
Mojo	The 50 Best Albums of 2016	2016	24	
Paste	50 Best Albums of 2016	2016	3	
Pitchfork	The 20 Best Rock Albums of 2016	2016	—N/a	
Pitchfork	The 50 Best Albums of 2016	2016	24	
Pitchfork	The 200 Best Albums of the 2010s	2019	127	
Rolling Stone	50 Best Albums of 2016	2016	4	
Rolling Stone	The 100 Best Albums of the 2010s	2019	29	
Rough Trade	Albums of the Year	2016	10	
The Skinny	Top 50 Albums of 2016	2016	12	
Stereogum	The 50 Best Albums of 2016	2016	11	
Stereogum	The 100 Best Albums of the 2010s	2019	99	

== Track listing ==
All tracks are written by Will Toledo.

No.	Title	Length
1.	"Fill in the Blank"	4:04
2.	"Vincent"	7:45
3.	"Destroyed by Hippie Powers"	5:03
4.	"(Joe Gets Kicked out of School for Using) Drugs with Friends (But Says This Isn't a Problem)"	5:37
5.	"Not What I Needed"	4:31
6.	"Drunk Drivers / Killer Whales"	6:14
7.	"1937 State Park"	4:00
8.	"Unforgiving Girl (She's Not An)"	5:26
9.	"Cosmic Hero"	8:31
10.	"The Ballad of the Costa Concordia" (contains lyrics and elements of the song "White Flag", written by Florian Armstrong, Rollo Armstrong and Rick Nowels)	11:30
11.	"Connect the Dots (The Saga of Frank Sinatra)"	6:07
12.	"Joe Goes to School"	1:19
Total length:		70:07

Japanese bonus tracks
No.	Title	Length
13.	"Act Suspicious (Note: Act Suspicious is a re-recording of the song off of 2 of the same name.)"	1:39
14.	"The Move"	5:50
Total length:		77:36

Notes

- The album accidentally originally released with bonus tracks “The Deal” and “America.” The latter is a rerecording of “America (Never Been)” released originally on How to Leave Town.

== Personnel ==
Car Seat Headrest

- Will Toledo – vocals, guitars, organ, piano, Mellotron
- Ethan Ives – bass, vocals, guitars, vibrato switch on organ
- Andrew Katz – drums, mixed percussion, Mellotron, vocals
- Seth Dalby – bass (track 8)

Additional musicians

- Jon Maus – trumpets and trombone (tracks 2, 9, 10)
- Nick Shadel – piano (track 10)
- Jim Dejoie – saxophone (track 11)

Production

- Steve Fisk – production
- Gordon S. Fisk – back cover photograph
- Mike Zimmerman – cover layout, design

== Charts ==
Chart (2016)	Peak position
Belgian Albums (Ultratop Flanders)	121
Dutch Albums (Album Top 100)	82
UK Albums (Official Charts)	198
US Billboard 200	180
US Heatseekers Albums (Billboard)	3
US Independent Albums (Billboard)	15
US Top Alternative Albums (Billboard)	16
US Top Rock Albums (Billboard)	22
