= Will Toledo =

Indie rock musician

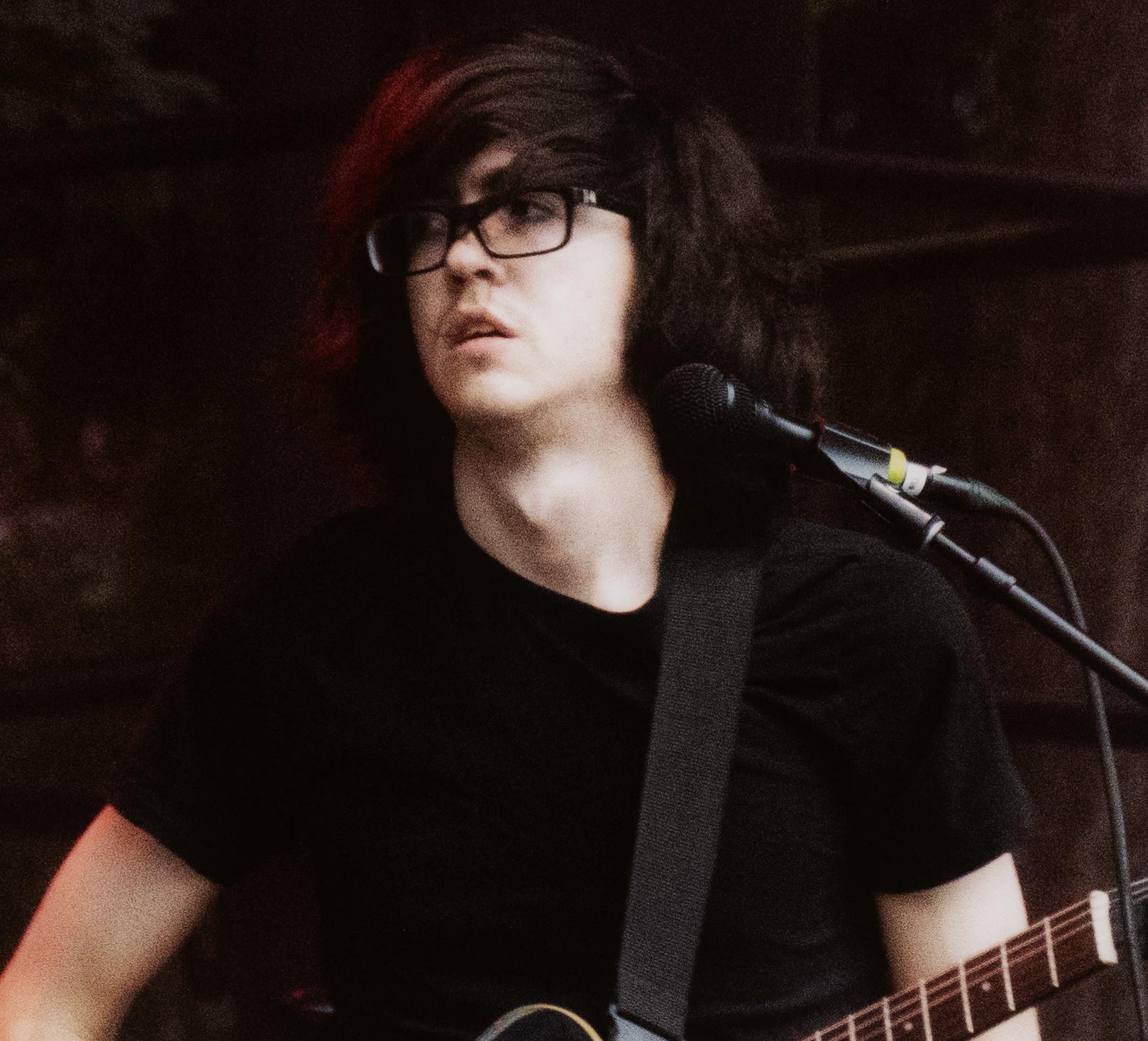
- Will Toledo in 2019

Background information
- Also known as: Mortis Jackrabbit; Trait
- Born: William Barnes; August 23, 1992 (age 34); Leesburg, Virginia, U.S.
- Origin: Leesburg, Virginia, U.S.
- Genres: Indie rock; slacker rock; lo-fi; power pop; psychedelic rock; electronic rock
- Occupations: Musician; singer; songwriter; producer
- Instruments: Vocals; guitar; keyboards; bass; drums
- Years active: 2007-present
- Member of: Car Seat Headrest; 1 Trait Danger
- Formerly of: The 63rd Fret, Mr. Yay Okay, Nervous Young Men
- Website: carseatheadrest.com

William Barnes (born August 23, 1992), known professionally as Will Toledo, is an American singer-songwriter, multi-instrumentalist, producer, and founding member of the indie rock band Car Seat Headrest.

== Early life ==
William Barnes was born and raised in Leesburg, Virginia, with his father working for the local county government, and his mother working as a special education teacher's aide. As a child, Toledo and his two sisters were taught piano by their father, recounting a story with Vice of how his father thought he knew how to read sheet music, but Toledo had instead only been imitating how his father played. Toledo began learning guitar at around 12 or 13, and has used the same Yamaha steel-string acoustic guitar since 8th grade.

While attending Loudoun County High School, Toledo was involved in marching band, and played trombone. During this time, he would also begin pursuing music on his own, becoming involved with the band Mr. Yay Okay, as well as working under his own solo projects, The 63rd Fret and Nervous Young Men. Toledo would begin sharing his work through the online music distribution platform Bandcamp after learning about the success the band Cults had been able to achieve through the platform. Toledo has stated that he and his musical style are influenced by Nirvana, The Beach Boys, Radiohead, Leonard Cohen, and Green Day.

== Car Seat Headrest ==
Toledo began Car Seat Headrest as a solo project shortly after graduating from high school, choosing the name as he would frequently record his vocals in the back seat of his family's car for privacy. As he had originally struggled to establish an audience through his previous projects, he chose to try to release more experimental songs anonymously.

Under the Car Seat Headrest moniker, Toledo released eight studio albums, three extended plays, and two outtakes' compilations between 2010 and 2014. In 2015, upon signing to Matador Records, Toledo recruited drummer Andrew Katz and bassist Jacob Bloom, turning Car Seat Headrest into a full band.

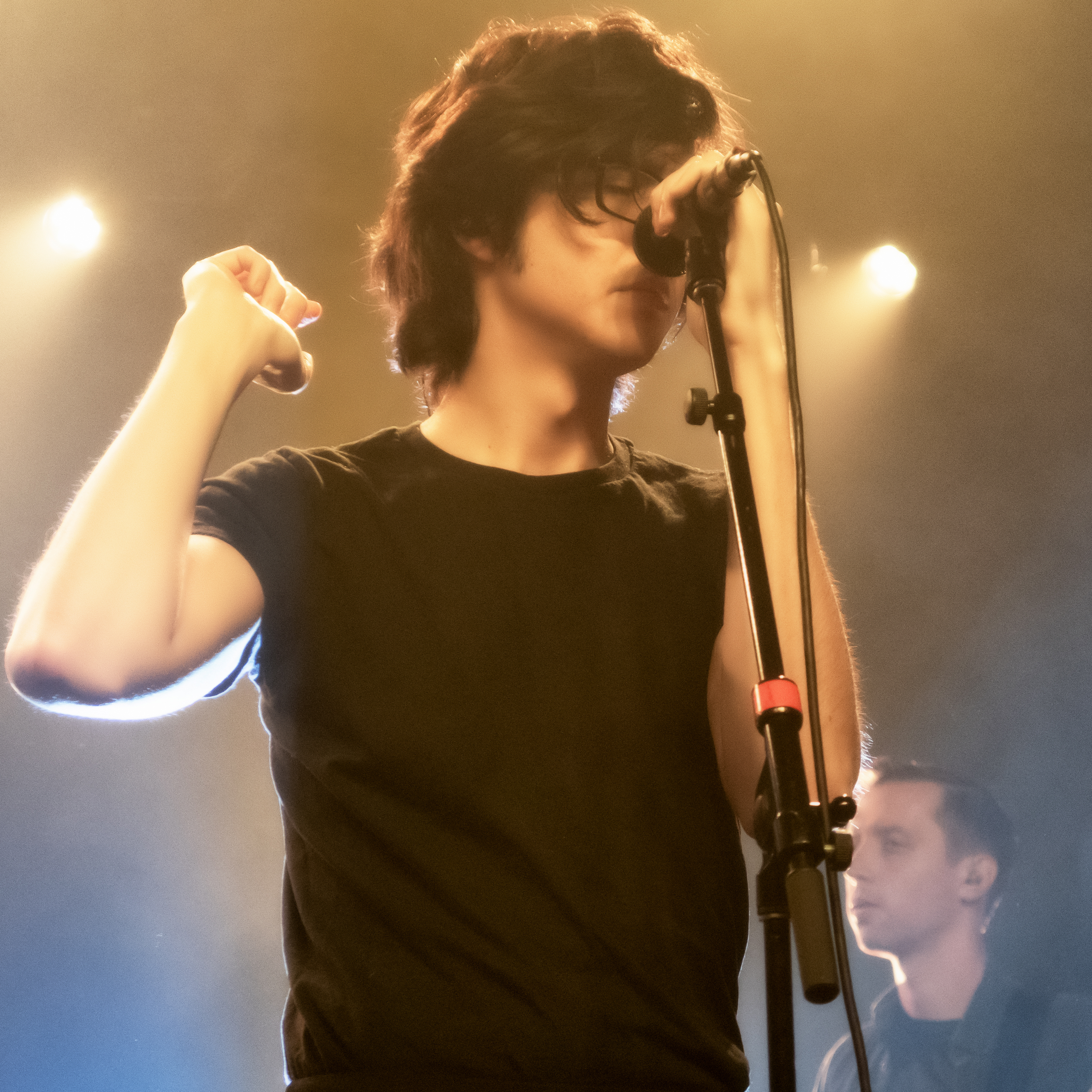
Toledo performing with Car Seat Headrest at The Showbox in 2018.

Within Car Seat Headrest, Toledo provides vocals, guitar, piano, and synthesizers. Toledo's songwriting often combines influence from literature with personal, 'confessional' lyricism. Toledo is also one half of music duo 1 Trait Danger with Katz, with Toledo often performing as Trait and Katz often performing as Stoney. Together, they have released five albums.

Toledo posted covers on his Tumblr account car seat headrest and through livestreams on Twitch during the COVID-19 pandemic, under his Twitch account traitincommon.

== Personal life ==
Toledo graduated from Loudoun County High School in 2010, and subsequently enrolled at Virginia Commonwealth University. After a semester, Toledo would transfer to the College of William & Mary in Williamsburg, Virginia, where he majored in English and minored in religious studies. He graduated from William & Mary in 2014 and moved to Seattle, Washington to pursue Car Seat Headrest professionally. Toledo is gay and a member of the furry fandom. He is one-fourth Mexican. He takes his professional name, Toledo, from his mother's maiden name.

Despite themes of mental unrest in his songwriting, Toledo does not consider himself depressed or mentally ill. He has previously faced autoimmune complications since early adulthood, and developed a histamine intolerance after testing positive for COVID-19 while on tour in 2022. He has since used social media to raise awareness for long COVID.

== Discography ==
=== As Nervous Young Men ===
- The Bell Jar (2008)
- Boxing Day (2009)
- Katzenjammer (2009)
- The Loudness War (2009)
- Nervous Young Men (2010)

=== Mr Yay Okay ===
- Mr. Yay Okay (2008, EP)

=== 1 Trait Danger ===
- 1 Trait High (2018)
- 1 Trait World Tour (2019)
- 1 Trait Bangers (2021)
- 1 Trait University (2025)
- Escape from 1 Trait (2025)

=== Production ===
Year	Release	Artist	Ref
2011	D'Urberville	The Whiting Brothers	
2012	Sleeping in Herndon	Naked Days	
2014	Chai Knees	Naked Days	
2014	Tie Yourself to Me	Katie Wood	
2015	Four Ways To Say Goodbye Forever	American Holly	
2017	Gold Connections	Gold Connections	
2019	Midnight	Stef Chura	
2021	My Head Hz	Naked Days	
2021	How To Drive A Bus	I've Made Too Much Pasta	
