= Earth discography =

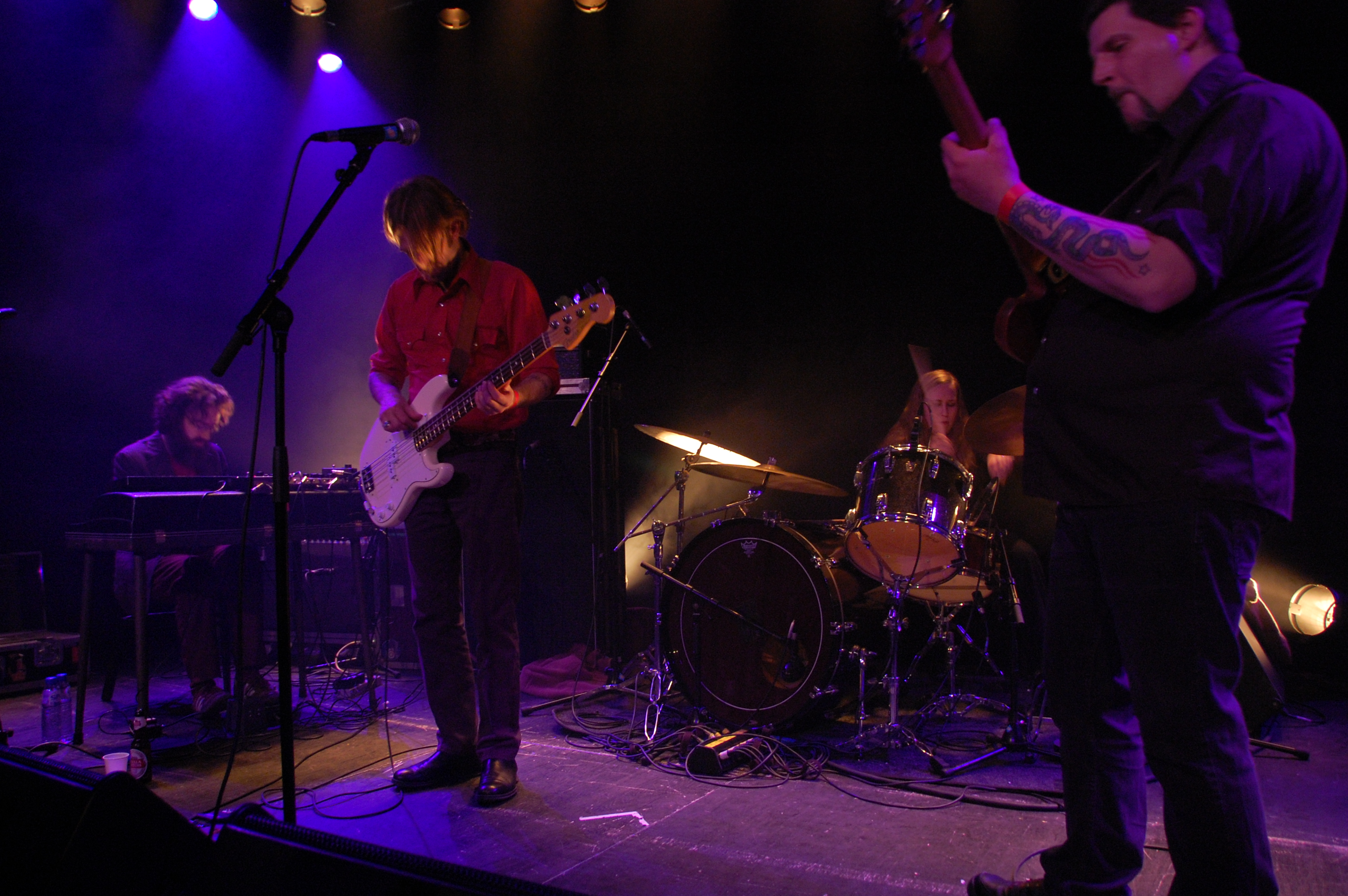
- Earth performing live in Hamburg in 2009; from left to right: Steve Moore, Don McGreevy, Adrienne Davies and Dylan Carlson
- Studio albums: 9
- EPs: 3
- Live albums: 6
- Compilation albums: 1
- Video albums: 1
- Music videos: 1
- Split releases: 4
- Remix albums: 1

The discography of Earth, an Olympia, Washington-based experimental music group, consists of nine studio albums, six live albums, a compilation album, a remix album, a video album, three extended plays, four split releases and a music video.

== Albums ==
=== Studio albums ===
| Year | Album details | Peak chart positions | |
| Year | Album details | US | US Heat. |
|---|---|---|---|
| 1993 | Earth 2: Special Low-Frequency Version: Released: February 5, 1993; Label: Sub Pop; Format: CD, LP | — | — |
| 1995 | Phase 3: Thrones and Dominions: Released: April 25, 1995; Label: Sub Pop; Format: CD, LP | — | — |
| 1996 | Pentastar: In the Style of Demons: Released: July 23, 1996; Label: Sub Pop; Format: CD, LP | — | — |
| 2005 | Hex; Or Printing in the Infernal Method: Released: October 23, 2005; Label: Southern Lord; Format: CD, LP | — | — |
| 2008 | The Bees Made Honey in the Lion's Skull: Released: February 26, 2008; Label: Southern Lord; Format: CD, LP | — | — |
| 2011 | Angels of Darkness, Demons of Light I: Released: February 22, 2011; Label: Southern Lord; Format: CD, LP | — | 40 |
| 2012 | Angels of Darkness, Demons of Light II: Released: February 14, 2012; Label: Southern Lord; Format: CD, LP | — | — |
| 2014 | Primitive and Deadly: Released: September 2, 2014; Label: Southern Lord; Format: CD, LP | — | 3 |
| 2019 | Full upon Her Burning Lips: Released: May 24, 2019; Label: Sargent House; Formats: CD, LP, DL | — | — |
"—" denotes a release that did not chart.

=== Live albums ===
| Year | Album details |
|---|---|
| 1995 | Sunn Amps and Smashed Guitars: Released: 1995; Label: Blast First |
| 2003 | 070796 Live: Released: 2003; Label: Autofact |
| 2005 | Living in the Gleam of an Unsheathed Sword: Released: January 25, 2005; Label: Megablade |
| 2006 | Live Hex: In a Large City on the North American Continent: Released: 2006; Label: aRCHIVE |
| 2007 | Live Europe 2006: Released: 2007; Label: Southern Lord |
| 2008 | Radio Earth Live 2007 – 2008: Released: 2008; Label: Southern Lord |
| 2017 | Live at Third Man Records: Released: November 24, 2017; Label: Third Man Records |
| 2025 | WEM Dominator (Live in London NW1, 2016): Released: May 23, 2025; Label: Fire Records |

=== Remix albums ===
| Year | Album details |
|---|---|
| 2005 | Legacy of Dissolution: Released: July 7, 2005; Label: No Quarter / Southern Lord |
| 2023 | Earth 2.23 Special Lower Frequency Mix: Released: November 23, 2023; Label: Sub Pop |

=== Compilation albums ===
| Year | Album details |
|---|---|
| 2010 | A Bureaucratic Desire for Extra-Capsular Extraction: Released: October 25, 2010; Label: Southern Lord |

=== Video albums ===
| Year | Album details |
|---|---|
| 1991 | Bureaucratic Desire For Revenge: Released: 1991; Label: Sub Pop |

== EPs ==
| Year | Album details |
|---|---|
| 1991 | Extra-Capsular Extraction: Released: October 18, 1991; Label: Sub Pop |
| 2003 | Divine and Bright: Released: July 23, 2003; Label: Autofact |
| 2007 | Hibernaculum: Released: March 20, 2007; Label: Southern Lord |

== Split releases ==
| Year | Album details |
|---|---|
| 2003 | Earth / KK Null: Released: 2003; Label: Important; Other artist: KK Null |
| 2006 | Angel Coma: Released: March 8, 2006; Label: Southern Lord; Other artist: Sunn O))) |
| 2007 | Earth / Tribes of Neurot: Released: 2007; Label: Neurot Recordings; Other artist: Tribes of Neurot |
| 2008 | Earth / Sir Richard Bishop: Released: 2008; Label: Southern Lord; Other artist: Sir Richard Bishop |

== Singles ==
- "Cats on the Briar" (2019)

== Music videos ==
| Year | Title |
|---|---|
| 1996 | "Tallahassee" |
| 2019 | "The Colour of Poison" |
