= Earth 2 (album) =

Earth 2: Special Low Frequency Version

Studio album by Earth
- Released: February 5, 1993
- Recorded: August 1992
- Studios: Avast! (Seattle, Washington)
- Genre: Drone metal
- Length: 73:01
- Label: Sub Pop
- Producers: Earth, Stuart Hallerman

Earth chronology
Extra-Capsular Extraction (1991)	Earth 2: Special Low Frequency Version (1993)	Phase 3: Thrones and Dominions (1995)

Earth 2: Special Low Frequency Version is the debut studio album by the American rock band Earth, released on February 5, 1993 on Sub Pop. Produced by Earth and Stuart Hallerman, it was highly influential in the development of drone music, especially the drone metal subgenre.

== Background and recording ==
The recent advent of compact discs allowed for playing times up to 74 minutes, which encouraged the group to "fill up an entire CD with one song in three parts." However, the recording tape used only allowed for a maximum of 30 minutes, so bandleader Dylan Carlson said they were forced to "sort of splice it or fade it in and fade up, stuff like that" to achieve the longer songs.

The group were signed to Sub Pop, closely associated with the grunge genre. But Carlson explained: "what we did was not grunge and not part of that whole thing. A lot of people I think that bought the records saying Sub Pop expecting something were disappointed." He noted that "luckily I wore a Morbid Angel t-shirt on the back of the album and so metal fans were sort of the first to really embrace what we were doing."

== Music ==
Earth 2 contains almost no drums or percussion instruments, only cymbal crashes within "Like Gold And Faceted". The album makes use of extreme levels of guitar distortion, feedback and delay. The album's riffs are highly repetitious and droning, drawing comparisons to Tony Iommi of Black Sabbath but at a much slower tempo. Ned Ragget of AllMusic described the album's sound as "ambient music completely and totally suffused with threat and fuzz."

Jonathan Horsley of Guitar World wrote, "Earth 2 is a massage chair for the inner ear, and over an unhurried 70-minute-plus running time it inveigles its way through the rest of the body, shaking your timber. What falls out are ideas, inspiration, and perhaps even the promise of an epiphany." In his book Gimme Indie Rock, music journalist Andrew Earles wrote "If any of the early Earth albums perfected the marriage of [Brian] Eno's ambient works and the almighty doom metal riff, this was it." Carlson gave the following assessment regarding the album's sound: "It very much represents my age. At that time, I was young and full of vigor as they say. It represents contrariness and willingness to be unpopular."

Carlson has stated that the album draws influence from thrash metal band Slayer and progressive rock band King Crimson. The album also draws "conceptual inspiration" from minimalist composer La Monte Young, whose music Carlson knew mostly by reptuation as Young's recordings were difficult to obtain. As a child, Carlson was a fan of classic rock groups such as AC/DC, noting that "when I would hear a song and there’d be a cool riff or a cool part of the song I was always like, 'Oh, what would it be like if they stayed on that instead of moving on to the next part?' Then I read about minimalism and stuff like that. I was like, 'Oh, what if we take a Slayer-style riff and play it for 20 minutes at half speed?' I guess you could say that was my one good idea."

== Artwork ==
The font used on the cover and the subtitle are a nod to Environments 2: Tintinnabulation (Special Low Frequency Version) (1987). According to Ned Raggett of AllMusic: "If one opens up the CD, the reverse of the booklet shows a wide selection of pills -- arguably Earth and its stoned and droned appeal in a nutshell."

== Reception and legacy ==
Professional ratings
Review scores
Source	Rating
AllMusic	5/5 stars
The Encyclopedia of Popular Music	3/5 stars
Kerrang!	(1993) (2011)
Mojo	5/5 stars
Select	4/5 medals

Celebrated as a "milestone" by Terrorizer's Dayal Patterson, he described it as "a three-track, 75 minute deluge of feedback and distorted guitars that marked the blueprint for what lead singer/guitarist Dylan Carlson at the time coined 'ambient metal'". Jonathan Horsley of Guitar World wrote: "Metal needed [it] then, as now." AllMusic's John Bush called the album a "glacial, monolithic exercise" which "virtually created the drone and ambient metal subgenres." Critic Ned Raggett of AllMusic gave the album a positive review, stating: "If Carlson and his bassist du jour, in this case Dave Harwell, weren't quite Sub Pop's answer to the ranges of UK guitar extremism from the likes of Godflesh, Main, and Skullflower, Earth still came pretty darn close to it, creating a record even the Melvins would find weird."

Alan Licht, in his third list of minimalist classics, wrote "Unlike a lot of more recent noise underground stuff, which (to me) is relatively factorable, this is technically boggling drone music—the sustain is achieved not just with distortion but through overdubbing, and there's clean guitars in there too—even on headphones it's hard to tell what the fuck they're really doing. On this album, Earth set up a drone and place a few choice metal riffs against it over the course of forty minutes, at which point they just let the drone chord ring for another half hour... Hard to remember how completely unfashionable this was in the heyday of grunge".

Earth Guitarist Dylan Carlson said in 2018: "To me, a lot of people talk about how huge this record sounds. I think this record sounds very claustrophobic. Knowing what I know now, I would’ve definitely recorded it differently, but then it would be a different album, huh? I’m very glad that people responded to it though, eventually. It’s very gratifying to know that this record has had a small effect and achieved some sort of notice. To know it’s inspired people to do stuff is really cool."

In 2021, a writer for Revolver wrote: "No list of drone albums for metalheads would complete without Earth 2, right? [...] I love imagining some poor soul who bought this record in 1993 because they liked Nirvana and saw that Sub Pop put this out."

== Track listing ==
No.	Title	Length
1.	"Seven Angels"	15:35
2.	"Teeth of Lions Rule the Divine"	27:05
3.	"Like Gold and Faceted"	30:21
Total length:		73:01

== Personnel ==
- Dylan Carlson – guitar
- Dave Harwell – bass guitar
- Joe Burns – percussion on "Like Gold and Faceted"
