= Your Heart Breaks =

American indie band

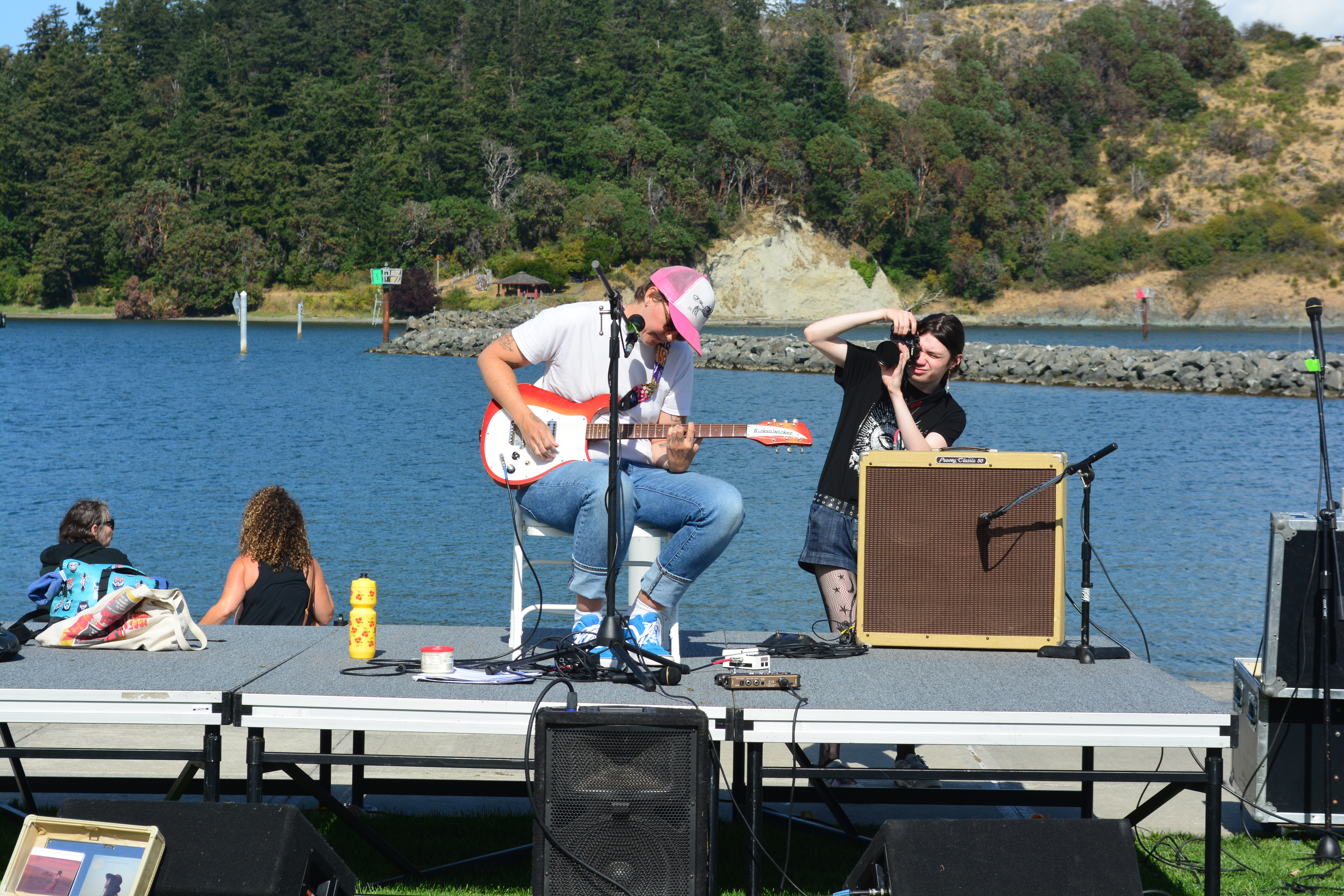
- Petersen performing solo at AMPFest 2022

Background information
- Origin: Bellingham, Washington
- Genres: Indie rock, folk
- Years active: 1998 – Present
- Labels: Kill Rock Stars
- Members: Clyde Petersen; Karl Blau; Lori Goldston; Kimya Dawson; Kyle Field; Dylan Carlson; Adrienne Davies; Katherine Paul; Eli Moore; Ashley Eriksson

Your Heart Breaks is an indie rock band from Seattle, Washington led by artist and musician Clyde Petersen. The group was formed in Bellingham, Washington in 1998. Petersen is transgender and his songwriting, particularly on album Drone Butch Blues (2019), often explores queer themes. The rest of the lineup of the group is fluid, however common collaborators include Karl Blau, Lori Goldston, Kimya Dawson, Kyle Field, Dylan Carlson and Adrienne Davies.

== History ==
Your Heart Breaks was started by Petersen in Bellingham, Washington in 1998 whilst studying film production and stop motion animation at Western Washington University.

The band released multiple albums, either by self-releasing or through small independent labels, throughout the 2000s.

In July 2016, in honour of cartoonist, illustrator, and musician Geneviève Castrée who had recently passed, Petersen released From Mount Eerie. It had been recorded in 2008 whilst Petersen had been staying at Castrée and her husband Phil Elverum's house. The music produced was so sad that Petersen had opted not to release it at the time of recording.

In October 2016 Petersen released Torrey Pines, a film he had written, directed, and animated over the previous three years. The soundtrack for which was recorded by Your Heart Breaks and several other collaborators - including Chris Walla.

On 19 April 2019 the band released album Drone Butch Blues on Sofaburn Records. A concept album inspired by the writings of LGBTQI authors, it explores an array of stories surrounding the queer community in the 20th Century. The lyrical themes include forbidden love, the impact of AIDS, and rebellion, as well as snippets of Petersen's own life.

On July 7, 2023, Your Heart Breaks released The Wrack Line on cult independent record label Kill Rock Stars. Collaborators on this record included Katherine Paul, Eli Moore and Ashley Eriksson from the band LAKE, Kimya Dawson, Theo Hilton of Nana Grizol, David Christian of Comet Gain, Christine Fellows, and John K Samson of The Weakerthans.

== Discography ==
=== Albums ===
- Kittens - Self-released (2002) Re-released (2015)
- Tales from the Gimli Hospital - MASA Records (2005)
- New Ocean Waves - Plan-It-X Records/MASA Records (2006)
- Sailor System - Don't Stop Believin' Records (2006)
- Love Is A Long Dark Road (Love Is All You Need) - Mighty Mo Records/Lost Sound Tapes/Fiscal Year Records (2008)
- Harsh Tokes And Bong Jokes - This Will Be Our Summer / Lost Sound Tapes (2012)
- America - Self-released (2015)
- My Side Of The Mountain with Rae Spoon - Self-released (2016)
- From Mount Eerie - Self-released (2016)
- Torrey Pines (Official Soundtrack) - Self-released (2016)
- Drone Butch Blues - Sofaburn Records (2019)
- The Wrack Line - Kill Rock Stars (2023)
