= Primitive and Deadly =

Studio album by Earth
- Released: September 2, 2014
- Recorded: Rancho de la Luna in Joshua Tree, California; Avast! in Seattle, Washington
- Genre: Doom metal; post-rock
- Length: 47:15
- Label: Southern Lord
- Producer: Randall Dunn

Earth chronology
Angels of Darkness, Demons of Light II (2012)	Primitive and Deadly (2014)	Full Upon Her Burning Lips (2019)

Primitive and Deadly is the eighth studio album by American musical group Earth. It was released on September 2, 2014, through Southern Lord Records. The album, which features Mark Lanegan and Rabia Shaheen Qazi of Rose Windows as guest vocalists, is the first Earth album since Pentastar: In the Style of Demons (1996) to feature vocals. Other contributors include Brett Netson of Built to Spill, Jodie Cox of Narrows, and Bill Herzog of Jesse Sykes.

The third track off the album, "From the Zodiacal Light", was released for streaming on June 18, 2014. In support of the record, the band embarked on a world tour in 2014.

== Background ==
The album was recorded at Rancho de la Luna in Joshua Tree, California and Avast! Recording Company studio in Seattle, Washington with producer Randall Dunn who had previously worked with Earth on Hex; Or Printing in the Infernal Method (2005) and The Bees Made Honey in the Lion's Skull (2008). On the press release, the band stated that they "allowed themselves to be a rock band" and "approached traditional pop structures." Rabia Shaheen Qazi and Mark Lanegan performed vocals on one and two songs, respectively, while Brett Netson and Jodie Cox contributed additional guitar tracks to the album.

== Critical reception ==
Professional ratings
Aggregate scores
Source	Rating
Metacritic	80/100
Review scores
Source	Rating
AllMusic	4/5 stars
Drowned in Sound	8/10
musicOMH	4/5 stars
Pitchfork	(7.0/10)
About.com	4.5/5 stars

Upon its release, Primitive and Deadly received a positive reception from music critics. At Metacritic, which assigns a normalized rating out of 100 to reviews from critics, the album received an average score of 80, which indicates "Generally favorable reviews", based on 18 reviews. Thom Jurek of AllMusic stated: "Earth's massive, plodding, serpentine approach on Primitive and Deadly reflects a new focus on lyric euphony and a renewed commitment to corporeal force." Jurek also further added: "The pervasive, blinding darkness that saturates this bleak, sublime music is driven by the band's collective desire to seek ecstasy in the very heart of the void." Drowned in Sound critic Tristan Bath described the album as "the latest in a recent suite of triumphs—by this point Earth are masters of their game, making music that’s bigger and more powerful than anything mere mortals should be able to create." musicOMH critic Sam Shephard wrote: "Primitive and Deadly, in part, represents an encapsulation of Earth’s discography, but more importantly it also sees the band moving on, entering a new phase and expanding their dimensions." Grayson Currin of Pitchfork declared: "Earth have seemed overdue for a change, and these songs collectively represent a promising half-step toward it."

== Track listing ==
All songs written by Dylan Carlson except where noted.

1. "Torn By The Fox of the Crescent Moon" – 8:54
2. "There Is a Serpent Coming" (Carlson, Lanegan) – 8:06
3. "From the Zodiacal Light" (Carlson, Qazi) – 11:29
4. "Even Hell Has Its Heroes" – 9:43
5. "Rooks Across the Gate" – 9:03
6. "Badgers Bane" (vinyl-only bonus track) – 12:27

== Personnel ==
Earth

- Dylan Carlson – guitar
- Adrienne Davies – drums
- Bill Herzog – bass guitar

Guest contributors

- Mark Lanegan – vocals (2, 5)
- Rabia Shaheen Qazi – vocals (3)
- Brett Netson – guitar
- Jodie Cox – guitar

Other personnel

- Randall Dunn – production
- Samantha Muljat – artwork
