= Push th' Little Daisies =

1993 single by Ween

Single by Ween

from the album Pure Guava
- B-side: "Ode to Rene"; "I Smoke Some Grass (Really Really High)"; "Mango Woman"
- Released: May 30, 1993
- Genre: Alternative rock; neo-psychedelia; lo-fi
- Length: 2:50
- Label: Elektra
- Songwriters: Gene Ween; Dean Ween
- Producer: Ween

Ween singles chronology
"I'm Fat" (1992)	"Push th' Little Daisies" (1993)	"Sky Cruiser" (1992)

"Push th' Little Daisies" is a song by American band Ween from their third album, Pure Guava, and released as a single in 1993. A music video was released, featuring Dean and Gene Ween eating various foods while fooling around with cuts to a girl and interspersed with them performing the song. The video (which replaced the word "shit" with a sample of Prince squealing—taken from his song "Alphabet St.") and the song gained exposure after being critiqued on the MTV show Beavis and Butt-head.

The song was a hit in Australia, spending 13 weeks on the Australian Singles Chart and peaking at number 18 in August 1993. At the end of the year, it was ranked 40th on Triple J's annual Hottest 100 music poll. The song was also successful on US alternative rock radio, charting at number 21 on the Billboard Modern Rock Tracks chart.

== Critical reception ==
Reviewing "Push th' Little Daisies" for Melody Maker, Simon Reynolds characterized Ween as 'slacker pathetique' (in reference to the knowing amateurishness of punk pathetique) and a "lo-fi Notsensibles next to Sebadoh's ATV". Reynolds wrote that the song "could have been a gorgeous Stevie Wonder/Isley Bros ballad, but the singer has inhaled helium and sounds like a goblin." The Age critic Richard Plunkett deemed it among the more unusual novelty songs since the Wurzels' "The Combine Harvester" (1976), situating Ween's style between the Violent Femmes and They Might Be Giants and noted that the song's vocal imitates "a 13-year-old love-obsessed creep over a tinny backing of guitar and drum machine."

The A.V. Club said, "there's something undeniable about the madness of 'Push th' Little Daisies', with its roots in alternative-nation open-mindedness, pop subversion, and lots of drugs. It's crazy catchy, too, even as it's deliberately annoying." Andrew Earles of Spin comments that it was inspired by the Barnes & Barnes song "Fish Heads" (1978). In his book Gimme Indie Rock (2014), Earles calls it a "Barnes and Barnes/Dr. Demento-style romp with helium-pitched vocals", believing it to be "one of the oddest three minutes of music to reach a wide audience". Noting the improved production qualities of Pure Guava over its two predecessors, Ira Robbins of Trouser Press noted how "Push th' Little Daisies", a "peppy and irritating old-lady-voiced ode to flowers (or is it burial?)", was "presentable enough for radio play". Pitchfork critic Stuart Berman writes: "Even in the midst of a '90s alt-rock boom that encouraged the masses to turn and face the strange, the song was odd, sounding like a nursery rhyme performed by a Casiotone-toting hotel-lounge act fronted by a six-year-old." The song is mentioned in the book 1001 Songs You Must Hear Before You Die.

== Track listing ==
Push th' Little Daisies EP

1. "Push th' Little Daisies" (Shitless radio edit—no shit) – 2:49
2. "Push th' Little Daisies" (Happier Than Shit album version) – 2:49
3. "Ode to Rene" – 2:21
4. "I Smoke Some Grass (Really Really High)" – 7:45
5. "Mango Woman" – 2:23
6. "Push th' Little Daisies" (Funky Drummer mix) – 2:52

== Charts ==
=== Weekly charts ===
Weekly chart performance for "Push th' Little Daisies"
Chart (1993)	Peak position
Australia (ARIA)	18
US Modern Rock Tracks (Billboard)	21

=== Year-end charts ===
Year-end chart performance for "Push th' Little Daisies"
Chart (1993)	Position
Australia (ARIA)	82

== Release history ==
Release dates and formats for "Push th' Little Daisies"
Region	Date	Format(s)	Label(s)	Ref.
Australia	May 30, 1993	CD; cassette	White	
United Kingdom	August 30, 1993	12-inch vinyl; CD	August	
