= Sock It To Me =

"Sock It To Me" may refer to:

== Music ==
- "Sock It to Me, Baby", an album by Mitch Ryder and the Detroit Wheels, released 1967.
  - "Sock It to Me, Baby", a song by Mitch Ryder and the Detroit Wheels, released January 1967.
- "Sock It to Me", in Aretha Franklin's version of the song "Respect," released March 1967.
- "Sock It to Me", in Goin' Down by the Monkees. Released October 25, 1967.
- "Sock It To Me", a song by Beautiful People from the 1994 album If 60's Were 90's
- "Sock It 2 Me", a 1997 song by Missy Elliott
- Sock It to Me, a 2013 album by Colleen Green

== Television ==
- "Sock it to me", a frequently recurring phrase in TV series Rowan & Martin's Laugh-In 1968–1973
- "Sock It To Me", an episode of TV series Bump in the Night

== Other uses ==
- Sock It To Me (clothing company), based in Oregon, U.S.
