= Peace in Mississippi =

Song by Jimi Hendrix

from the album Crash Landing
- Released: October 24, 1975
- Recorded: October 24, 1968
- Studio: TTG, Hollywood, California
- Genre: Hard rock
- Length: 4:21
- Label: Reprise
- Songwriters: Jimi Hendrix, Alan Douglas (credit)
- Producers: Alan Douglas, Tony Bongiovi

"Peace in Mississippi" is an instrumental by Jimi Hendrix. The version included on Voodoo Soup is the original version of the song (although in edited form), as recorded by Hendrix, drummer Mitch Mitchell and bassist Noel Redding in 1968, and different from the version of "Peace in Mississippi" included on Crash Landing, in which Mitchell's and Redding's contributions were supplanted by overdubbed drum and bass parts performed by other musicians in 1975; the version on Crash Landing also includes overdubbed guitar and percussion parts performed in 1975. In addition, the version on Voodoo Soup is about a minute longer than the one on Crash Landing. The version of "Peace in Mississippi" included on the Valleys of Neptune CD single, that was sold exclusively at Walmart, has the unedited version of the song, and so does the B-side of the 2010 release of Hendrix's version of Elmore James's "Bleeding Heart".

Earth recorded it for their 1996 album Pentastar: In the Style of Demons. In 2001, Shawn Lane covered it for The Tri-Tone Fascination. Beautiful People sampled the instrumental in 1994 for their album If 60's Were 90's.
