= If 60's Was 90's =

Single by Beautiful People

from the album If 60's Were 90's
- Released: 1994
- Genre: House, breaks, techno
- Label: Essential Records
- Songwriter: Du Kane/Luke Baldry
- Producer: Ben Mitchell

"If 60's Was 90's" is a song by Beautiful People. Recorded in 1991, the song was first released on their album If 60's Were 90's in 1992 but was not released as a single until 1994 after the success of "Rilly Groovy", charting at #74 on the UK Singles Chart and #5 on the Hot Dance Club Songs chart.

== Background ==
The song was written by group-leader Du Kane, with the programming done by Luke Baldry at Kane's mother's house in Sussex. The song is a downtempo cover version of Jimi Hendrix's "If 6 Was 9", sampling vocals and drums from said song and from The Dick Cavett Show, and copious amounts of blues guitar from Voodoo Chile including its entire final solo at the end. The song has live drums with bandmembers augmenting the drum samples from "If 6 Was 9"; in a blog post, Baldry explained that the style of the song required the rhythm section to have been more rigid than the take they sampled, and to combat said woes the then-ubiquitous Akai S1000 sampler was used to take a six-track sample of "If 6 Was 9"'s drums and drop it across the entire drum track. Multiple attempts were necessary because, according to Baldry, the Akai at the time was incapable of behaving as a stereo sampler, despite its claims to the contrary, because it didn't know how to lock the phase correlation and as a result every time a stereo sample was triggered the relationship between left and right was different. (This is fixed by turning on "note-on sample coherence", although this delays the note start.)

== Music video ==
A music video was shot for the song. It was directed by Richard Heslop in March 1994 at his house in Hammersmith and Notting Hill and features Jimi Hendrix Jnr, a friend of the band, miming to the final solo.
