= Angels of Darkness, Demons of Light I =

Studio album by Earth
- Released: February 22, 2011
- Recorded: April 2010
- Genre: Experimental rock; post-rock
- Length: 60:26
- Label: Southern Lord
- Producer: Stuart Hallerman, Dylan Carlson and Adrienne Davies

Earth chronology
The Bees Made Honey in the Lion's Skull (2008)	Angels of Darkness, Demons of Light I (2011)	Angels of Darkness, Demons of Light II (2012)

Angels of Darkness, Demons of Light I is the sixth full-length studio album by the band Earth, released on Southern Lord Records. Cello is introduced as a new instrument, along with the usual ones being used since the album Hex. Dylan Carlson describes the album as more melodic and riff oriented. The second part of the album was released in 2012. The album illustrations were created by Stacey Rozich.

== Reception ==
Professional ratings
Aggregate scores
Source	Rating
Metacritic	82/100
Review scores
Source	Rating
AllMusic	4/5 stars
Classic Rock	4/5 stars
Drowned in Sound	8/10
The Guardian	5/5 stars
Kerrang!	4/5 stars
Mojo	4/5 stars
Pitchfork	7.9/10
Rock Sound	8/10
Tiny Mix Tapes	4/5 stars
Uncut	4/5 stars

In the AllMusic review, Thom Jurek awarded the album 4 stars out of 5, describing the album as "harmony and dissonance coexist[ing] without antagonism, creating a heaviness and tension that are aesthetically beautiful and emotionally resonant." Pitchfork's Grayson Currin also gave the album a positive review, stating "In the 90s, Earth's heavy metal offered an escape, a massive shelter of volume and drone. But the intricacies of this Earth—Carlson's harmonics and harmonies, Davies' careful builds, Blau's unexpected bass maneuvers, Goldston's adventurous versatility—demand attention and immersion. That is, check in, not out, and you'll rarely hear four players with as much quiet command."

== Track listing ==
All tracks by Earth

No.	Title	Length
1.	"Old Black"	8:49
2.	"Father Midnight"	12:11
3.	"Descent to the Zenith"	7:30
4.	"Hell’s Winter"	11:32
5.	"Angels of Darkness, Demons of Light I"	20:24
Total length:		60:26

== Personnel ==
- Dylan Carlson — electric guitar and devices
- Adrienne Davies — trap kit and percussives
- Lori Goldston — cello and devices
- Karl Blau — electric bass guitar
