= Clyde Petersen =

American film director, animator, and musician

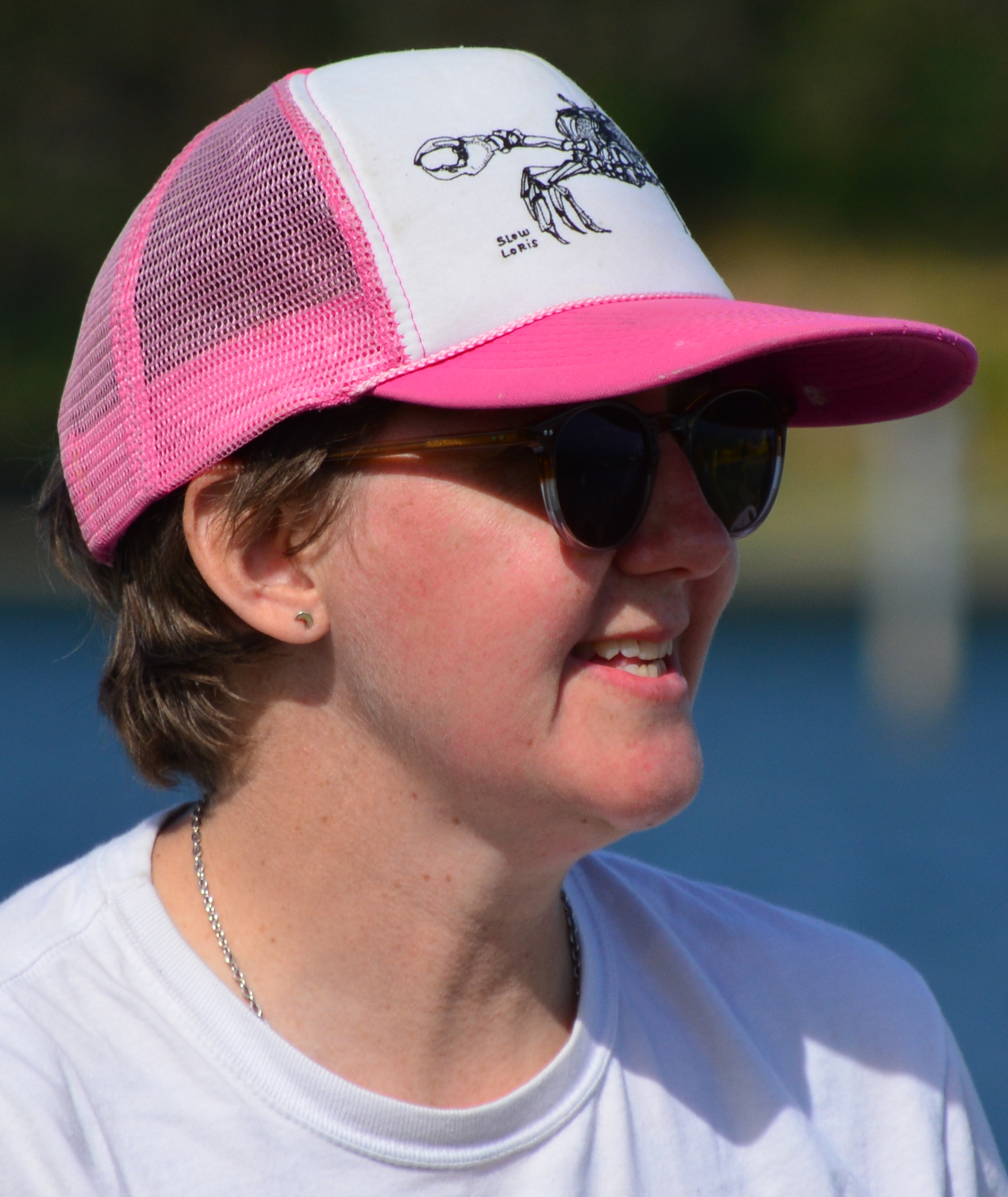
- Clyde Petersen, 2022
- Born: 1980 (age 45–46)
- Education: Western Washington University
- Occupations: Director; Animator; Musician
- Years active: 1998–present
- Website: https://www.clydepetersen.com/

Clyde Petersen is an artist based in Seattle, working in film, animation, music, and installation. As a director, he is best known for Torrey Pines (2016), an autobiographical stop-motion animated feature film, which toured the world with a live score.

He is the founding member of punk band Your Heart Breaks. Between 2012 and 2015, he hosted the web series Boating with Clyde, set on a small handmade boat in the Washington Park Arboretum. In 2016, he released Torrey Pines, a film he directed, wrote, and animated. Petersen is transgender and his art often explores queer themes.

== Career ==
In 1998, whilst living in Bellingham, Washington and studying documentary film production at Western Washington University, Petersen started the band Your Heart Breaks. The band has released multiple albums, either by self-releasing or through small independent labels, throughout the 2000s and 2010s.

Petersen worked with animation on commercials at a post-production house in Seattle. He has directed music videos (some of which were animated) for The Thermals, Laura Veirs, Deerhoof, and Thao & the Get Down Stay Down.

In October 2016, Petersen released Torrey Pines, a film he had written, directed, and animated over the previous three years. The soundtrack for which was recorded by Chris Walla and features members of Your Heart Breaks as well as several other collaborators. The film was toured worldwide with a live score for the next two years.

In early 2018, Petersen announced he was working on a documentary about the American drone metal band Earth. This is entitled Even Hell has its Heroes and had its North American premiere on May 17, 2023 the Seattle International Film Festival.

Petersen's art installation work often uses cardboard and paper as medium, akin to his stop-motion animations. From late 2018 to spring 2019, he had an exhibition entitled Merch and Destroy at the Bellevue Arts Museum in Washington.

== Filmography ==
Year	Film	Credited as				Notes
Year	Film	Director	Producer	Editor	Animator	Notes
2010	The Unspeakable	Yes	Yes	Yes		Documentary
2010	Last Night on Earth	Yes	Yes	Yes		Documentary Short
2012	After Terminal Velocity	Yes	Yes	Yes		Short
2012	13 Wayz to Get Hard	Yes	Yes		Yes	Animated Short
2012 - 2015	Boating With Clyde	Yes	Yes	Yes		Four Season Web Series
2016	Torrey Pines	Yes	Yes	Yes	Yes	Animated Feature
2023	Even Hell has its Heroes	Yes	Yes	Yes		Documentary about drone metal band Earth
