= 070796 Live =

Live album by Earth
- Released: 2003
- Recorded: 2001–2003
- Genre: Drone doom
- Length: 68:27
- Label: OR Records/Autofact Records

Earth chronology
Pentastar: In the Style of Demons (1996)	070796 Live (2003)	Living in the Gleam of an Unsheathed Sword (2005)

EARTH070796LIVE is a live album by Earth.

== Track listing ==
No.	Title	Length
1.	"070796"	22:21
2.	"Dissolution III (Oversaturated Intervallic Collisions)"	14:03
3.	"Dexamyl"	18:31
4.	"070796 (Reconstruction By James Plotkin)"	13:32

== Credits ==
- Dylan Carlson
- Adrienne Davies
- Ian Dickson
- James Plotkin
