= Essential Records =

Essential Records was the name of two record companies:

- Essential Records (London), a subsidiary of London Records
- Essential Records (Christian), a Christian subsidiary of Sony BMG Music Entertainment
