= Hollywood (Car Seat Headrest song) =

Single by Car Seat Headrest

from the album Making a Door Less Open
- Released: April 16, 2020
- Recorded: January 2019; October 2019
- Studio: Avast Recording Co. (Seattle)
- Genre: Alternative rock; synth-rock
- Length: 3:23
- Label: Matador
- Songwriters: Will Toledo; Andrew Katz
- Producers: Andrew Katz; Will Toledo

Car Seat Headrest singles chronology
"Martin" (2020)	"Hollywood" (2020)	"There Must Be More Than Blood" (2020)

Music video
- "Hollywood" on YouTube

"Hollywood" is a song by American indie rock band Car Seat Headrest. It was released on April 16, 2020, by Matador Records, as the third single from their twelfth studio album, Making a Door Less Open (2020). The song was written and produced by bandleader Will Toledo and drummer Andrew Katz.

== Composition and lyrics ==
The song was described by Spin as Car Seat Headrest's "aim to make a big leap into alternative rock". The staff further described the song to feature "familiar heavy riffs", "a big hook" and "heavy grooves". Toledo commented that the song was "about Hollywood as a place where people go to make their fantasies come to life, and they end up exploiting other people and doing terrible things to maintain their fantasy". In Pitchfork's review of the associated album, critic Ian Cohen described the lyrics as "Eephus pitch" and called it "something that destabilizes through counter-intuitive simplicity".

== Critical reception ==
Writing for Pitchfork, Ian Cohen compared the song as Toledo's "version of Weezer's 'Beverly Hills'" and described the concept as "catchy" and "banal". Upon reviewing the associated album, Jon Blistein of Rolling Stone called the track as one of the most "divisive". Writing for The Observer, Emily Mackay wrote that the song is "pleasingly punchy, but brought down by facile lyrics".

In a less positive review, Alexis Petridis of The Guardian described the track as Making a Door Less Open's "dead thud". Petridis stated: "a conflation of guitar and raw-throated rapping in which the spirit of 1 Trait Danger seems rather too evident, self-consciously wacky shrieked vocals and all."

== Music video ==
The release of the track was accompanied by an animated music video. It was directed by Sabrina Nichols. In the animated music video, Toledo appears as his alter ego, Trait, wearing a gas mask, as he takes a journey through Hollywood.

== Personnel ==
Credits adapted from Bandcamp.

Car Seat Headrest

- Will Toledo – vocals, synths, keyboards, organ, guitar, piano, drum programming
- Andrew Katz – vocals, drums, drum programming
- Ethan Ives – guitars
- Seth Dalby – bass guitar

Additional musician

- Gianni Aiello – guitar

Technical

- Will Toledo – production, engineering, mixing
- Andrew Katz – production, mixing, mastering

== Charts ==
Chart (2020)	Peak position
US Adult Alternative Airplay (Billboard)	31
US Alternative Airplay (Billboard)	29
US Rock & Alternative Airplay (Billboard)	45
