= Extra-Capsular Extraction =

EP by Earth
- Released: October 18, 1991
- Recorded: October 1990 at Smegma Studios in Portland, Oregon
- Genre: Drone metal
- Length: 32:21
- Label: Sub Pop
- Producer: Earth

Earth chronology
Extra-Capsular Extraction (1991)	Earth 2 (1993)

Professional ratings
Review scores
Source	Rating
AllMusic	2.5/5 stars

Extra-Capsular Extraction is the first official release by the drone doom band Earth. Despite the length, it is an EP release. Originally a CD only release, the first vinyl edition was released in 2002 by Sub Pop.

== Track listing ==
No.	Title	Length
1.	"A Bureaucratic Desire for Revenge, Part 1"	7:22
2.	"A Bureaucratic Desire for Revenge, Part 2"	6:38
3.	"Ouroboros Is Broken"	18:19

== Personnel ==
- Dave Harwell - bass guitar
- Dylan Carlson - guitar, vocals
- Joe Preston - bass guitar, percussion
- Guests: Kelly Canary and Kurt Cobain - vocals on "A Bureaucratic Desire for Revenge, Part 2" (and also on "Divine and Bright", included on the 2010 Southern Lord re-issue)
