= Pure Guava =

Studio album by Ween
- Released: November 10, 1992
- Recorded: 1990–1992
- Genres: Alternative rock; lo-fi; experimental rock; noise rock; noise; acid rock
- Length: 55:27
- Label: Elektra
- Producer: Ween

Ween chronology
The Pod (1991)	Pure Guava (1992)	Chocolate and Cheese (1994)

Singles from Pure Guava
- 1. "Push th' Little Daisies" Released: 1993

Pure Guava is the third studio album and major label debut by American rock band Ween, released on November 10, 1992, by Elektra Records. The record contains the US radio hit "Push th' Little Daisies".

== Background ==
The album features one of Ween's best-known songs, "Push th' Little Daisies." The song was also released as a single on August Records in 1993, including both the album and radio edit versions of the song (the latter replacing the word "shit" with a sample of Prince squealing from "Alphabet St."), as well as the tracks "Ode to Rene", "I Smoke Some Grass (Really Really High)" and "Mango Woman"; "Puerto Rican Power" replaces "I Smoke Some Grass" on some editions.

In a 1993 interview with Australia's Triple J, Dean Ween said many of the album's songs come from at least two tapes the band made for friends, including Springstuff and The Caprice Classic Tape.

The song "Big Jilm" was inspired by a car dealer named James A. Lemons who worked at the dealership Dean Ween's father owned.

The song "Poop Ship Destroyer" became a live staple for the band, although the live performances usually bear little resemblance to the album version and are instead played as a protracted jam.

== Touring ==
The band toured throughout the United States in late 1992 and 1993 to support the album. One of these shows was in the band's hometown of New Hope, Pennsylvania. In October 1993, they did an 11 show tour of Australia, a country where "Push th' Little Daisies" became an unexpected radio hit.

== Reception ==
Professional ratings
Review scores
Source	Rating
AllMusic	5/5 stars
Christgau's Consumer Guide	C+
Encyclopedia of Popular Music	3/5 stars
Entertainment Weekly	B+
MusicHound Rock	2.5/5 stars
OndaRock	7/10
The Rolling Stone Album Guide	3.5/5 stars
Spin Alternative Record Guide	6/10
Ultimate Guitar	8/10

AllMusic editor Heather Phares called the album "more polished and concise" than their previous albums The Pod and GodWeenSatan: The Oneness and wrote, "Considering Elektra released it, it's just as uncompromising as their previous work, but it hints at just how much further they could go with their music." Bill Wyman in Entertainment Weekly gave it a B+, noting that it was "Very, very weird, but I can't stop playing [it]". Robert Christgau was more negative in his Village Voice consumer guide, finding that the band wrote their "fucked-up" songs "without thinking (and how)". He went on to disparagingly call them "the kind of rec-room gigglefritzes who enjoy a good nigger joke when they're sure their audience is sophisticated enough to enjoy it. And to be perfectly honest, I don't hear one of those here."

Pure Guava was described as a modest commercial success. In its first six months of release it sold 65,000 copies.

== Legacy ==
In 1999, Ned Raggett, writing for the website Freaky Trigger, named Pure Guava the 53rd best album of the '90s, calling it "the greatest 'major label debut after an indie career' record of the decade. Not least because it was recorded in the same exact conditions and from the same exact sessions as most of said earlier indie career, so that means that Ween hit the big time with a record compiled from the outtakes that weren't good enough for their previous album, and it's still one of the best records ever made." The same year, German magazine Spex included the album on its list of the 100 best albums of the 20th century. Aphex Twin named it one of his 10 favorite albums of all time (making it one of two Ween albums on the list, the other being The Pod). In 1992, Faith No More covered parts of "The Goin' Gets Tough From the Getgo" on its Angel Dust tour.

In 2013, Andrew Earles of Spin ranked Pure Guava 7th on its list of the "40 Weirdest Post-Nevermind Major Label Albums". He noted the presence of "psychotically ill-tuned guitars, drum machines at their fartiest, sage advice not to 'caress the weasel,' ballads that ignored rhythm and reason, a five-minute power-electronics suite, a few dubious sing-a-longs centered around offensive accents, and, of course, a ride on the 'Poop Ship Destroyer.'" In 2014, Earles listed the album in his book Gimme Indie Rock: 500 Essential American Underground Rock Albums 1981–1996, in which he calls Pure Guava "one of the strangest albums ever to carry the logo of a major label". He also credits it as the second album released on a major label to be recorded wholly on an analog four-track recorder, after Bruce Springsteen's Nebraska (1982).

== Track listing ==
All tracks written by Ween, except "Flies on My Dick," by Ween and Guy Heller.

No.	Title	Lead vocals	Length
1.	"Little Birdy"	Melchiondo and Chris Williams	3:30
2.	"Tender Situation"	Melchiondo	3:40
3.	"The Stallion Pt. 3"	Freeman	3:30
4.	"Big Jilm"	Freeman and Melchiondo	2:10
5.	"Push th' Little Daisies"	Freeman	2:48
6.	"The Goin' Gets Tough from the Getgo"	Freeman and Melchiondo	2:08
7.	"Reggaejunkiejew"	Melchiondo	4:51
8.	"I Play It Off Legit"	Freeman and Melchiondo	3:20
9.	"Pumpin' 4 the Man"	Freeman and Melchiondo	1:30
10.	"Sarah"	Freeman	2:09
11.	"Springtheme"	Freeman	3:00
12.	"Flies on My Dick"	Melchiondo and Guy Heller	3:26
13.	"I Saw Gener Cryin' in His Sleep"	Melchiondo	1:48
14.	"Touch My Tooter"	Freeman	2:23
15.	"Mourning Glory"	Freeman	5:14
16.	"Loving U thru It All"	Freeman and Melchiondo	2:28
17.	"Hey Fat Boy (Asshole)"	Freeman	1:53
18.	"Don't Get 2 Close (2 My Fantasy)"	Freeman	3:23
19.	"Poop Ship Destroyer"	Freeman	2:16
Total length:			55:27

== Personnel ==
Ween

- Dean Ween – guitars, vocals, bass guitar, keyboards, drum machine
- Gene Ween – vocals, guitars

Additional musicians

- Guy Heller – vocals on "Flies on My Dick"
- Larry Curtin – backing vocals and whistling solo on "I Saw Gener Cryin' in His Sleep"
- Scott Lowe – second vocal and whistling solo on "Don't Get 2 Close (2 My Fantasy)"
- Mean Ween – second vocal on "Little Birdy"
- Stephan Said – additional instrumentation

Technical

- Dean Ween – producer, engineer
- Gene Ween – producer, engineer
- Andrew Weiss – mixing
- Patricia Frey – digital editing
- Howie Weinberg – mastering
- Tom Nichols – photography
- Reiner Design Consultants – design

== Charts ==
Chart performance for Pure Guava
Chart (1993)	Peak position
Australian Albums (ARIA)	93
