= Legacy of Dissolution =

Remix album by Earth
- Released: July 7, 2005
- Recorded: 2004
- Genre: Drone doom
- Length: 68:13
- Label: No Quarter; Southern Lord (SUNN40)
- Producer: Dylan Carlson and Mike Quinn

Earth chronology
Living in the Gleam of an Unsheathed Sword (2005)	Legacy of Dissolution (2005)	Hex; Or Printing in the Infernal Method (2005)

Professional ratings
Review scores
Source	Rating
Pitchfork Media	(7.8/10) link

Legacy of Dissolution is a 2005 tribute album featuring remixes of tracks by Earth.

== Track listing ==
No.	Title	Music	Length
1.	"Teeth of Lions Rule the Divine"	Mogwai	12:16
2.	"Tibetan Quaaludes (Waveset Sloth mix)"	Russell Haswell	9:30
3.	"Thrones and Dominions"	Jim O'Rourke	16:30
4.	"Coda Maestoso in F (Flat) Minor"	Autechre	5:35
5.	"Harvey"	Justin Broadrick	8:22
6.	"Rule the Divine (Mysteria Caelestis Mugivi)"	Sunn O)))	16:00
