= Seldon Hunt =

- Born: 1969 (age 56–57); Melbourne, Australia
- Occupations: Graphic designer, illustrator, documentary film maker, photographer, artist

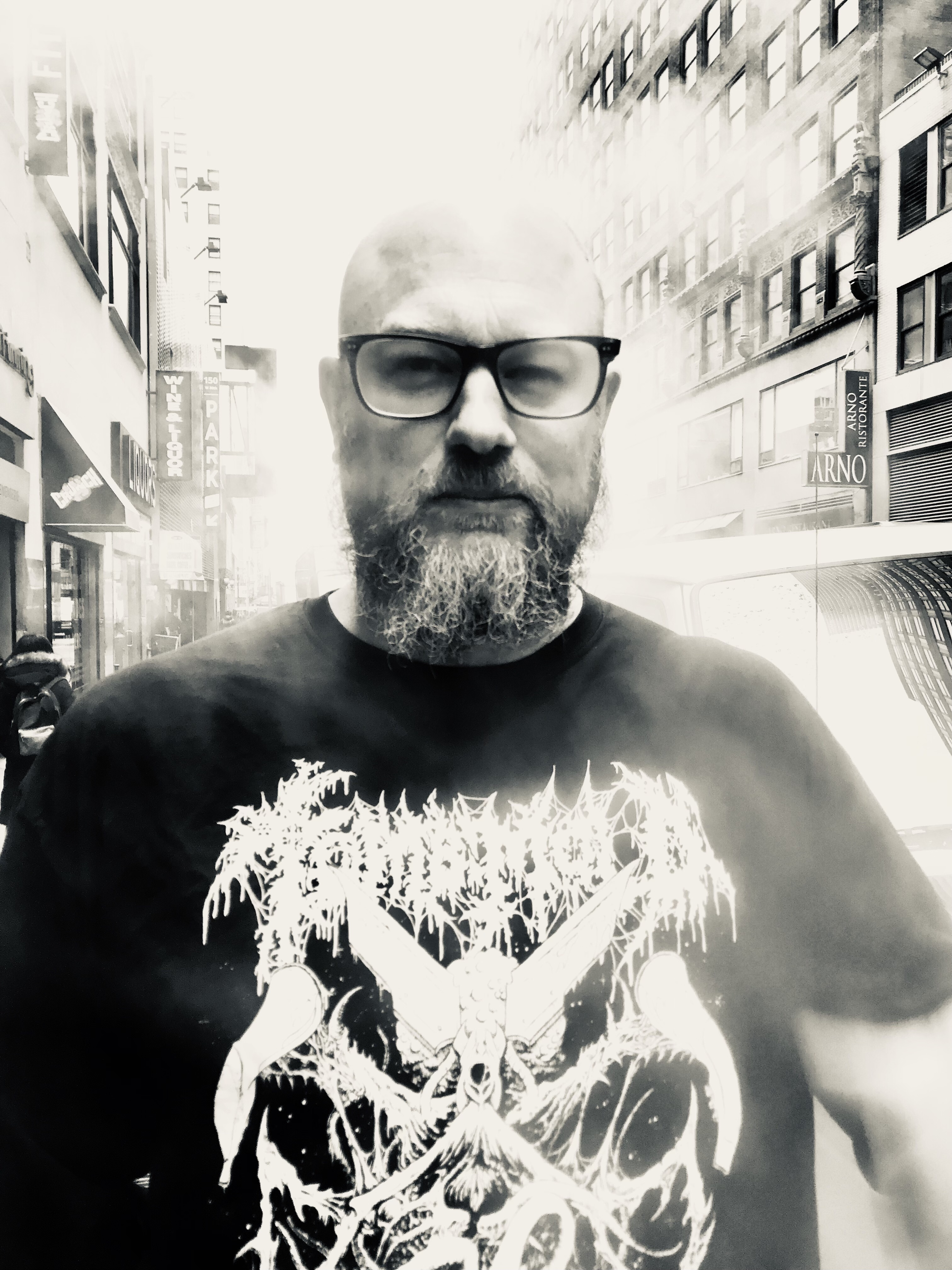
Seldon Hunt

Seldon Hunt (born 1969, in Melbourne and migrated to New York in 2006, (now residing in Brooklyn) is an artist best known for his photography and his graphic artwork (on album covers and promotional poster) for rock musicians.

Hunt's photography usually consists of thick undergrowth yet is often devoid of any human presence. His work has been compared to the romantic landscape painting of the 19th Century. His influences include the works of Vaughan Oliver and Neville Brody.

Hunt is best known in the world of music for his graphic works – often extremely complex – for rock bands Neurosis, Earth, Jesu, Isis, Dälek, Mick Harris, Acid Mothers Temple, and the Melvins. His first album cover artwork was for a solo album by KK Null (Zeni Geva). He has worked with Stephen O'Malley from Sunn O)))) and the label Southern Lord. His work is associated with other labels such as Hydrahead, Ipecac, TeePee and Relapse Records.

He is the author of an essay published in the booklet of Sunn O)))'s The Grimmrobe Demos.

== Selected exhibitions ==
=== Solo exhibitions ===
- 2009 "Six Degrees of Transmutation" – Baum Gallery in University of Central Arkansas, USA

=== Group exhibitions ===
- 2008 "Catalyst" – FIFTY24SF gallery in San Francisco, USA

== Filmography ==
- "Within the Drone" (Biographic documentary about Dylan Carlson) contained with Hibernaculum by Earth

== Bibliography ==
- Khanate – "Things Viral"
- Sunn O))) "Grimmrobe Demos" 2005
- Sunn O))) "Black"
- Andrew Pegler, ed. (2004). The Bugle's dicktionary : unabridged, unadulterated, unflattering, unconcise edition. Illustrator: Seldon Hunt. South Yarra, VIC: Hardie Grant Books. ISBN 1-74066-194-X.
