= If 6 Was 9 =

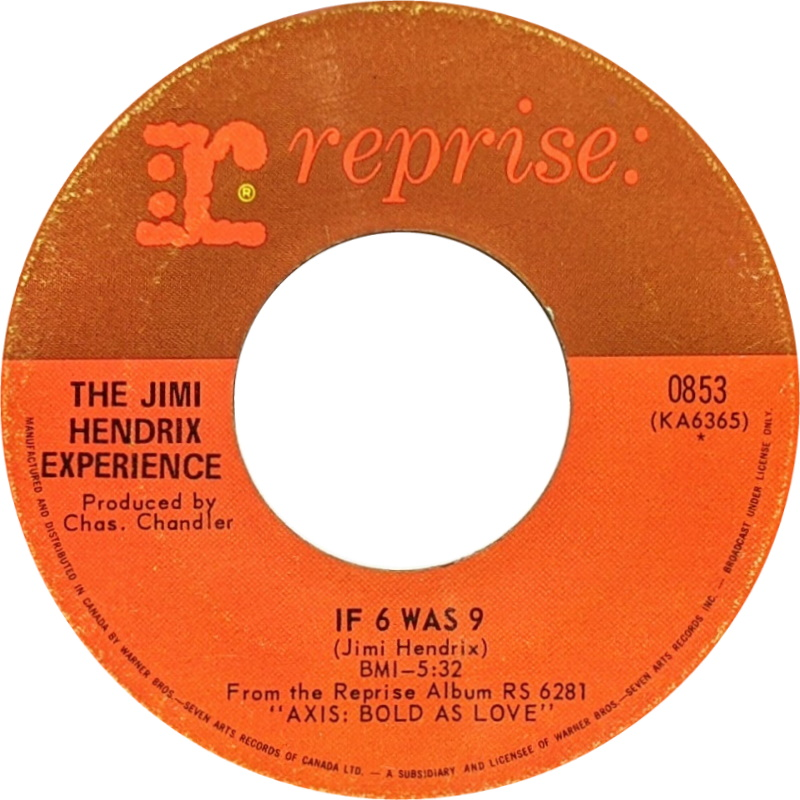

Song by the Jimi Hendrix Experience

from the album Axis: Bold as Love
- Released: December 1, 1967 (UK); January 15, 1968 (US)
- Recorded: May 4–5, 1967
- Studio: Olympic, London
- Genre: Psychedelia; acid rock; space rock; experimental; proto-prog; blues rock; proto-metal; jazz fusion
- Length: 5:32
- Label: Track (UK); Reprise (US)
- Songwriter: Jimi Hendrix
- Producer: Chas Chandler

"If 6 Was 9" is a song written by Jimi Hendrix and recorded by the Jimi Hendrix Experience. It was released on their second studio album Axis: Bold as Love (1967). It appeared on the soundtrack for the film Easy Rider (1969) and the soundtrack for the film Point Break (1991).

== Style and instrumentation ==
The style of the song has been referred to as "acid-fueled blues". The guitar solo makes innovative use of studio technology for the time, with stereo panning from left to right and vice versa, along with other effects, such as slap echo, fuzzbox distortion, and reverb.

== Lyrics ==
Sara Pendergast described it as an "individualist anthem". The lyrics portray the underlying conflict of the counterculture of the 1960s: the "social and cultural dichotomies" between the hippies and the "white collared conservative" business world of the establishment. Beginning with a blues riff, the lyrics accompany a "spacey" free-form jam, with Hendrix epitomizing the existentialist voice of the youth movement: "I'm the one that's got to die when it's time for me to die/so let me live my life/the way I want to."

Authors Harry Shapiro and Caesar Glebbeek believe the lyrics, "if the mountains fell into the sea" are a reference to the creation myth of the second world of Hopi mythology. Frank Waters' Book of the Hopi (1963) was known to have influenced Hendrix, and many of his songs contain mythological themes and images related to Native Americans in the United States.

Various urban legends based on numerology have developed around the meaning of number 9 in the song and Hendrix's death in 1970.

== Renditions ==
In 1991, Beautiful People adapted the song as "If 60's Was 90's" for the album If 60's Were 90's. Written by group leader Du Kane, it reached 74 on the UK Singles Chart and number five on the Hot Dance Club Songs chart.
