= Living in the Gleam of an Unsheathed Sword =

Live album by Earth
- Released: January 25, 2005
- Recorded: WNYU Radio, September 17, 2002
- Genre: Drone doom
- Length: 73:16
- Label: Megablade

Earth chronology
070796 Live (2003)	Living in the Gleam of an Unsheathed Sword (2005)	Legacy of Dissolution (2005)

Professional ratings
Review scores
Source	Rating
Allmusic	3/5 stars
Pitchfork Media	4.9/10

Living in the Gleam of an Unsheathed Sword is a 2005 live album by the American drone band Earth.

== Track listing ==
No.	Title	Length
1.	"Dissolution III"	14:21
2.	"Living in the Gleam of an Unsheathed Sword"	58:52

== Credits ==
- Dylan Carlson – guitar
- Adrienne Davies – drums
