= Conquistador (Dylan Carlson album) =

Studio album by Dylan Carlson
- Released: April 27, 2018
- Length: 32:08
- Label: Sargent House
- Producers: Dylan Carlson; Kurt Ballou

Singles from Conquistador
- 1. "Scorpions in Their Mouths" Released: March 7, 2018

Professional ratings
Aggregate scores
Source	Rating
Metacritic	75/100
Review scores
Source	Rating
AllMusic	4/5 stars
Drowned in Sound	8/10
Loud and Quiet	9/10
MusicOMH	3.5/5 stars
Pitchfork	6.7/10

Conquistador is the debut studio album by American musician Dylan Carlson and his first full-length recording outside the band Earth. It was released on April 27, 2018, under Sargent House.

== Singles ==
On March 7, 2018, Carlson released the first single from the album, "Scorpions In Their Mouths".

== Critical reception ==
Conquistador was met with "generally favorable" reviews from critics. At Metacritic, which assigns a weighted average rating out of 100 to reviews from mainstream publications, this release received an average score of 75, based on 8 reviews. Aggregator Album of the Year gave the release a 78 out of 100 based on a critical consensus of 7 reviews.

== Track listing ==
Conquistador track listing
No.	Title	Length
1.	"Conquistador"	13:12
2.	"When the Horses Were Shorn of Their Hooves"	5:45
3.	"And Then the Crows Descended"	1:01
4.	"Scorpions in Their Mouths"	5:46
5.	"Reaching the Gulf"	6:24

== Personnel ==
Musicians

- Dylan Carlson – lead artist, guitar, producer
- Holly Carlson – percussion
- Emma Ruth Rundle – baritone and slide guitar, devices, and percussion

Production

- Kurt Ballou – engineer, producer
- Carl Saff – mastering
