= Angels of Darkness, Demons of Light II =

Studio album by Earth
- Released: February 14, 2012
- Recorded: April 2010
- Genre: Experimental rock; post-rock
- Length: 45:53
- Label: Southern Lord Records
- Producer: Stuart Hallerman, Dylan Carlson and Adrienne Davies

Earth chronology
Angels of Darkness, Demons of Light I (2011)	Angels of Darkness, Demons of Light II (2012)	Primitive and Deadly (2014)

Professional ratings
Aggregate scores
Source	Rating
Metacritic	83/100
Review scores
Source	Rating
AllMusic	4/5 stars
Classic Rock	4/5 stars
Drowned in Sound	9/10
Fact	4.5/5 stars
The Guardian	5/5 stars
Kerrang!	4/5 stars
Mojo	4/5 stars
Pitchfork	7.9/10
PopMatters	8/10
Tiny Mix Tapes	5/5 stars

Angels of Darkness, Demons of Light II is the seventh full-length studio album by the band Earth, released on February 14, 2012, through Southern Lord Records. This album was recorded at the same time as its predecessor Angels of Darkness, Demons of Light I.

== Track listing ==
No.	Title	Length
1.	"Sigil of Brass"	3:32
2.	"His Teeth Did Brightly Shine"	9:00
3.	"A Multiplicity of Doors"	13:04
4.	"The Corascene Dog"	8:26
5.	"The Rakehell"	11:51
Total length:		45:53

== Personnel ==
- Dylan Carlson - electric guitar and devices
- Adrienne Davies – trap kit and percussives
- Lori Goldston – cello and devices
- Karl Blau – electric bass guitar
