= Making a Door Less Open =

Studio album by Car Seat Headrest
- Released: May 1, 2020
- Recorded: January 2015 – April 2020
- Studio: Avast!
- Genres: Indie rock; experimental; electronic; EDM; lo-fi; pop
- Length: 47:28 (Streaming); 76:00 (Bandcamp); 48:32 (CD); 42:20 (LP)
- Label: Matador
- Producers: Will Toledo; Andrew Katz

Car Seat Headrest chronology
Commit Yourself Completely (2019)	Making a Door Less Open (2020)	Faces from the Masquerade (2023)

Singles from Making a Door Less Open
- 1. "Can't Cool Me Down" Released: February 26, 2020; 2. "Martin" Released: March 23, 2020; 3. "Hollywood" Released: April 16, 2020; 4. "There Must Be More Than Blood" Released: April 23, 2020

Making a Door Less Open (abbreviated as MADLO) is the twelfth studio album by American indie rock band Car Seat Headrest. It was released on May 1, 2020, through Matador Records. The album serves as the band's fourth under the label, and the second to consist of newly written material.

Making a Door Less Open marked a distinct stylistic divergence from the band's previous material. While Car Seat Headrest largely became known for their indie rock sound and use of lo-fi aesthetics, the album's style was largely influenced by experiments with 1 Trait Danger, an electronic side-project of band members Will Toledo and Andrew Katz. Each format of the album feature different track orders and alternate versions of tracks.

While critics reacted mostly positively to the album, enjoying the band's new electronic and EDM influences along with its lyricism, others criticised the album's experimentation, calling it unmemorable and not fully fleshed out.

== Background and production ==
=== Development ===
Writing for Making a Door Less Open began in January 2015, prior to the band's signing to Matador Records. Toledo began developing the songs electronically, with the ideas later being fleshed out into full songs in 2018.

In an official write-up on the album titled "Newness and Strangeness", Toledo wrote, "The songs [from Making a Door Less Open] contain elements of EDM, hip hop, futurism, doo-wop, soul, and of course rock and roll. But underneath all these things I think these may be folk songs, because they can be played and sung in many different ways, and they're about things that are important to a lot of people: anger with society, sickness, loneliness, [and] love".

=== Recording ===
During recording of the album, the band created two separate versions of Making a Door Less Open; one version was a traditional live album with guitars and drums, while the other was made with MIDI and other synthesized sounds. Toledo noted that he wanted the album to maintain the style and sound of demo recordings. Toledo also stated the album's title had no exact meaning; rather, he preferred it to be ambiguous to push people to listen to the album. Radiohead was noted as a large influence during the creation of Making a Door Less Open, specifically "Idioteque" and Kid A.

"Weightlifters" was the first song to be conceived for Making a Door Less Open, being written during a tour in 2015 to 2016. "Can't Cool Me Down" was made with the intention of using as many different instruments as possible, even if they clashed. Toledo noted the track "Hymn" was not intentionally written, and instead emerged from the recording sessions. The remixed version of the track came from a desire to have a hit song on streaming platforms. "Hollywood" started out as a more basic track, before Toledo decided to turn it into a rap song. The beat of "Martin" came about after Toledo had auto-generated a beat with Ableton. "Deadlines (Thoughtful)" was made from a slowed version of a 1 Trait Danger song, "DROVE MY CAR". "Life Worth Missing" came about after Toledo and Katz were texting each other anxiously after a lack of response from a demo version of the album.

Initial production and recording of the album finished up in December 2019, however, writing and recording for the digital version of the album (which had a later due date than the physical versions) continued into April 2020. Unlike previous albums from the band, Making a Door Less Open would end up being produced with more emphasis on individual tracks due to the increased prominence of digital streaming. This resulted in three differing versions of the album across all formats, with some featuring different versions of tracks or new tracks altogether.

== Music ==
Making a Door Less Open has been described as indie rock, experimental, lo-fi, electronic, EDM, and pop. Many critics noted the general shift in sound that came with the release of the album; rather than the indie rock and lo-fi sounds the band were known for with releases like Teens of Denial, Making a Door Less Open instead took on a more experimental and electronic approach. Much of this new sound was inspired by Toledo and Katz' comedic EDM side project, 1 Trait Danger.

=== Composition ===
The album's opener, "Weightlifters", discusses themes of change. Toledo notes how one's thoughts can change their body. Jeremy Winograd of Slant called the track "adrenaline-inducing" and referred to it as "grooving dance-rock". Critics also related this track to the album's new electronic sound. "Can't Cool Me Down" is a more explicitly electronic track. Kyle Kohner of Riff Magazine called it a "fun, sprawling indietronica cut". The track features sprawling guitar lines, electronic-based percussion and synthesizers. One critic likened Toledo's lyricism on the track to a blues song. The track "Deadlines" is split into four versions across all formats; "Deadlines (Hostile)" and "Deadlines (Thoughtful)" on digital services, "Deadlines" on physical editions, as well as a bonus acoustic version on CD. "Deadlines (Hostile)" has been referred to as a more traditional indie rock track, while "Deadlines (Thoughtful)" borrows influences from EDM and electronic music.

"Hollywood"
Hollywood is a rock song with lyrics criticizing exploitation within entertainment. It was especially controversial among critics due to its lyrics and sound.

"Hollywood" is a brash rock song featuring fuzzy synthesizers and a narrator disgusted at the exploitation within the entertainment industry. It features Katz shouting the lyrics to the song, while Toledo softly performs them. The track was one of the most controversial within reviews; some enjoyed the track, such as Jonathan Leal of PopMatters who called it "pithy and allusive", while others such as Steven Edelstone of Paste called it "cliché", "bland" and "horrendous". The physical edition of "Hollywood" removes the majority of Katz' shouting. "Hymn" was split into the original version on physical editions, along with "Hymn (Remix)" on digital services. Rob Hakimian of Beats Per Minute described the original track as one made up of atmospheric organs, featuring Toledo's discussion of life's futility. "Hymn (Remix)" is more experimental, containing "juddering" synthesizers and autotune that warps and distorts Toledo's voice. "Martin" has been described as an acoustic track that longingly discusses a past relationship. It features a "stuttering, off-kilter" drum machine and upbeat acoustic guitars. Alexis Petridis of The Guardian noted its resemblance to the band's older tracks. "What's With You Lately" is a shorter track that features vocals from band member Ethan Ives. Rhys Buchanan from NME described it as a "lovesick grunge ballad". "Life Worth Missing" discusses fear and depression. It features warm and shimmering synthesizers. Edelstone noted the track was a "nice middle ground" between the band's newer and older sound.

"There Must Be More Than Blood" contains lyrics of regret and disillusionment. It makes use of buzzing synthesizers and "sky-searching" guitars. The track is over 7 minutes long; the longest on the album. Emily Mackay of The Observer stated the track focuses on "self-deprecation and naked emotion". "Famous" closes the album across all versions. It borrows influences from hip-hop along with "Diplo-inspired machine-stomp". The track discusses themes of depression and isolation.

== Release ==
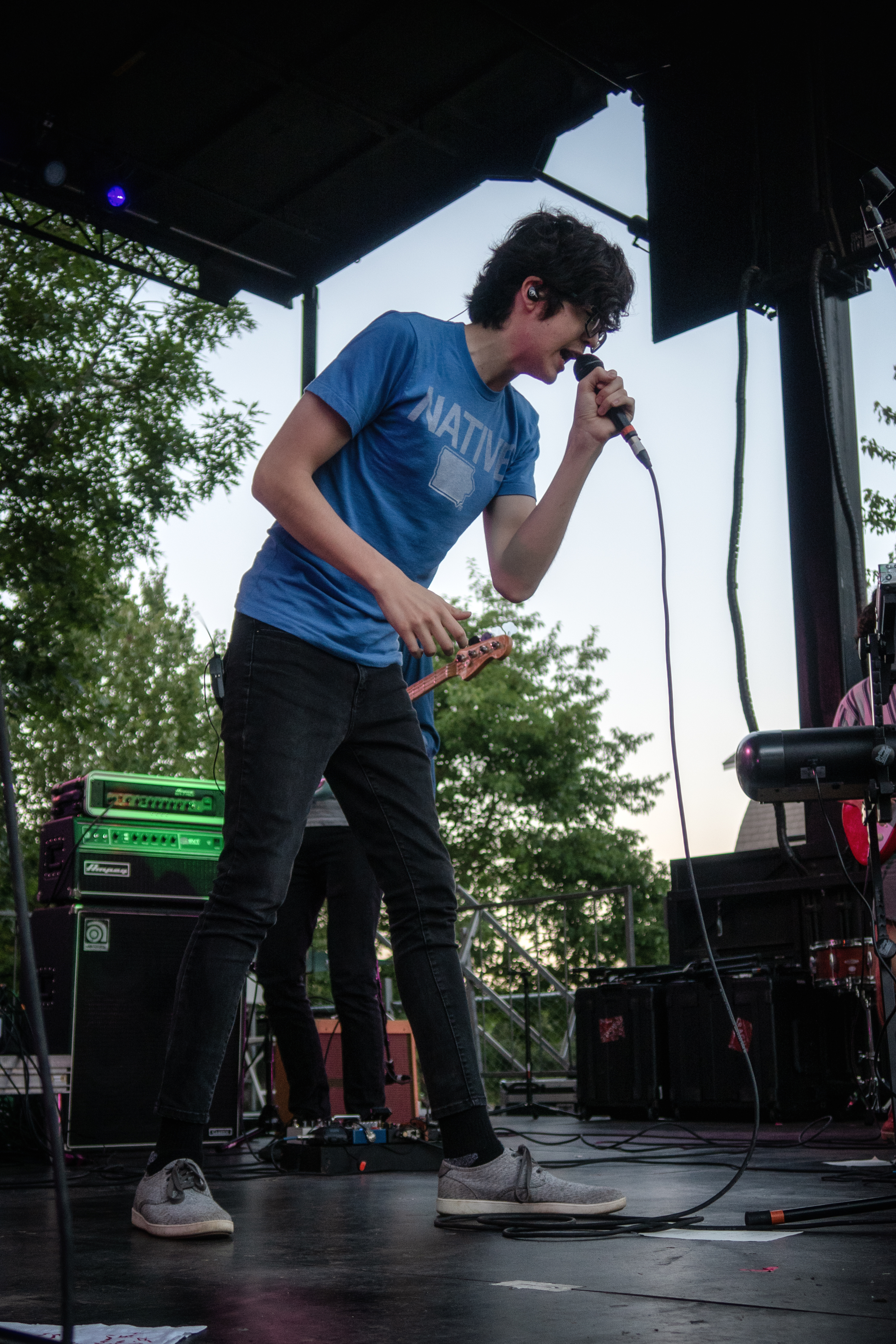
Toledo performing live in 2018

On February 26, 2020, Making a Door Less Open was officially announced by the band, along with the release of the album's first single, "Can't Cool Me Down". The album's announcement also coincided with the introduction of "Trait", an alternative persona of Toledo's which had originally stemmed from the band's side-project, 1 Trait Danger. The character is presented wearing a gas-mask with LED eyes, and a hi-viz jacket and pants. Toledo explained his reasoning for introducing the character as the result of performance anxiety.

The character would appear in the video for the album's second single, "Martin", which was released on March 23. A third single, "Hollywood", was released on April 16. It was accompanied with an animated music video by Sabrina Nichols featuring Trait. The final single, "There Must Be More Than Blood", was released on April 23.

Making a Door Less Open would officially release on May 1, 2020, through Matador on CD, LP and digital services. A tour accompanying the album was planned, although it was postponed due to the COVID-19 pandemic, later being rescheduled to 2022.

== Reception ==
Professional ratings
Aggregate scores
Source	Rating
AnyDecentMusic?	7.2/10
Metacritic	77/100
Review scores
Source	Rating
AllMusic	4/5 stars
Beats per Minute	85%
Clash	7/10
Consequence	B
DIY	4/5 stars
The Guardian	3/5 stars
NME	4/5 stars
Paste	6/10
Pitchfork	6.6/10
PopMatters	9/10

Making a Door Less Open received generally positive reviews from critics. At Metacritic, which aggregates scores from mainstream critics, Making a Door Less Open has an average score of 77 based on 23 reviews, indicating a score of "generally favorable".

Mark Deming of AllMusic gave the album 4/5 stars, stating that the album was "tremendously powerful". Deming wrote that while the songs on the album were "less cozy" and "more precise" than their previous work, the melodies of the album were still reminiscent of Toledo's earlier projects. Rob Hakimian of Beats Per Minute described how the album had some of the band's most "excoriating songs yet", also noting how the tracks were easy to emotionally connect to. Writing about the album for Clash, Marianne Gallagher stated how Making a Door Less Open was a fitting representation of the COVID-19 pandemic. Dan Weiss of Consequence enjoyed the album, writing about how it was clearly a "transitional album". In a review for DIY, Elly Watson described how the album marked the band moving away from their previous indie rock lo-fi sound, moving into experimentation with electronica instead. Jeremy Winograd of Slant stated that Making a Door Less Open was an album that "[overflowed] with adventurous new ideas", enjoying its new EDM influences. Writing for PopMatters, Jonathan Leal gave the album a 9/10, calling it a "landmark record" within the band's catalogue. Leal also stated how Katz had brought new creative energy out of Toledo. Rhys Buchanan of NME noted how the album would alienate some fans, but described how the band had fun composing it. In a piece about the album for Rolling Stone, Jon Blistein stated that even when the album was "clunky", it was still compelling.

Some critics had a more negative outlook of the album. Writing for Pitchfork, Ian Cohen wrote about how the album was made up of "mild disappointments and half-realized experiments". Steven Edelstone of Paste described the lack of relatable lyrics and melodies throughout the album. Edelstone concluded by writing how the album didn't seem fully fleshed out. In a review for Our Culture, Konstantinos Pappis wrote about how some of the album's experimentation worked, but some tracks were messy and fell flat. Writing for The Guardian, Alexis Petridis enjoyed tracks such as "Can't Cool Me Down" and "Hymn (Remix)", but noted how Making a Door Less Open sometimes "[landed] with a dead thud". Petridis also questioned the band's unclear vision with the album. Emily Mackay of The Observer enjoyed some of the new sound of the album, but noted that some tracks "[failed] to charm".

While critical reception was generally positive, fan reception was more divisive, with fans noting the many divergences from the band's previous work. In an interview with Binaural, Toledo would discuss the album's reception, saying:

"I'm bummed at what some people are making of it, because most people don't follow my philosophy of approaching [each album] completely fresh, so they see it in terms of how they see the band already. But I just can't really counter that; to me, music is only exciting when there's the possibility of going anywhere with it."

In a 2023 interview with Stereogum, Toledo would note that he still liked the songs on the record, but felt that the release of the album coinciding with the COVID-19 lockdowns had left fans feeling unreceptive to a "thorny" album.

== Accolades ==
Accolades for Making a Door Less Open
Publication	Accolade	Rank	Ref.
Billboard	Billboard's 50 Best Albums of 2020 – Mid-Year	—N/a	
Stereogum	Stereogum's 50 Best Albums of 2020 – Mid-Year	30	
Rolling Stone	Rolling Stone's 50 Best Albums of 2020 – Mid-Year	—N/a	
Under the Radar	Under the Radar's Top 100 Albums of 2020	43	

== Track listing ==
All tracks are written by Will Toledo, except where noted.

Digital edition
No.	Title	Writer(s)	Length
1.	"Weightlifters"		5:40
2.	"Can't Cool Me Down"		5:09
3.	"Deadlines (Hostile)"		4:21
4.	"Hollywood"	Toledo, Andrew Katz	3:23
5.	"Hymn (Remix)"		2:48
6.	"Martin"		3:28
7.	"Deadlines (Thoughtful)"	Toledo, Katz	5:52
8.	"What's With You Lately?"		1:35
9.	"Life Worth Missing"		4:53
10.	"There Must Be More Than Blood"		7:33
11.	"Famous"		2:45
Total length:			47:28

Bandcamp bonus tracks
No.	Title	Writer(s)	Length
12.	"Deadlines (Alternate Acoustic)"		3:06
13.	"Hollywood (Acoustic)"	Toledo, Katz	3:09
14.	"Hymn"		3:01
15.	"Hollywood (Vinyl Mix)"	Toledo, Katz	3:22
16.	"Deadlines"		5:02
17.	"Life Worth Missing (Vinyl Mix)"		4:52
18.	"There Must Be More Than Blood (Acoustic)"		6:00
Total length:			76:00

CD edition
No.	Title	Writer(s)	Length
1.	"Weightlifters"		5:41
2.	"Can't Cool Me Down"		5:09
3.	"Hollywood"		3:22
4.	"Martin"	Toledo, Katz	3:32
5.	"Hymn (Remix)"		2:48
6.	"There Must Be More Than Blood"		7:22
7.	"Deadlines"		5:05
8.	"What's With You Lately?"		1:37
9.	"Life Worth Missing"		4:52
10.	"Famous"		2:52
11.	"Deadlines" (alternative acoustic; bonus track)		3:07
12.	"Hollywood" (acoustic; bonus track)		3:10
13.	Untitled	Toledo, Katz
Total length:			48:32

Japanese CD bonus track
No.	Title	Length
13.	"Can't Cool Me Down (Live At MASS MoCA)"	8:19
Total length:		56:51

Vinyl Side A
No.	Title	Writer(s)	Length
1.	"Weightlifters"		5:38
2.	"Can't Cool Me Down"		5:08
3.	"Hollywood"	Toledo, Katz	3:23
4.	"There Must Be More Than Blood"		7:21
Total length:			21:30

Vinyl Side B
No.	Title	Length
5.	"Hymn"	3:02
6.	"Deadlines"	5:03
7.	"Martin"	3:27
8.	"What's with You Lately?"	1:37
9.	"Life Worth Missing"	4:52
10.	"Famous"	2:49
Total length:		42:20

== Personnel ==
Credits are adapted from Bandcamp, and the album's vinyl liner notes.

Car Seat Headrest

- Will Toledo – vocals, synthesizers, keyboards, organ, guitar, piano, drum programming (on "Martin")
- Andrew Katz – drums, drum programming, vocals (on "Hollywood")
- Ethan Ives – guitars, vocals (on "Can't Cool Me Down" and "What's With You Lately")
- Seth Dalby – bass guitar

Additional musicians

- Gianni Aiello – guitar (on "Hollywood" and "There Must Be More Than Blood")
- John Huggins – violin (on "Can't Cool Me Down")

Production

- Will Toledo – production, mixing, engineering
- Andrew Katz – production, mixing, mastering (digital)
- John McRae – engineering
- Bernie Grundman – mastering (vinyl)
- Cate Wurtz – artwork

== Charts ==
Chart performance for Making a Door Less Open
Chart (2020)	Peak position
Australian Albums (ARIA)	86
Belgian Albums (Ultratop Flanders)	91
Scottish Albums (Official Charts)	9
US Billboard 200	184
US Independent Albums (Billboard)	22
