= Phase 3: Thrones and Dominions =

Studio album by Earth
- Released: April 25, 1995
- Recorded: November 1993, 1994
- Genre: Drone metal; ambient
- Length: 55:04
- Label: Sub Pop
- Producer: Earth, Stuart Hallerman

Earth chronology
| Earth 2 (1993) | Phase 3: Thrones and Dominions (1995) | Sunn Amps and Smashed Guitars (1995) |

Phase 3: Thrones and Dominions is the second studio album by the American drone band Earth, released in 1995.

== Critical reception ==
Professional ratings
Review scores
| Source | Rating |
|---|---|
| AllMusic | 2/5 stars |

Spin deemed the album "stoner-metal Muzak that's as soothing as it is disturbing."

AllMusic lamented that "there are plenty of excellent ideas—stellar, half-written song structures that are never granted the proper completion or percussive accompaniment."

== Track listing ==
| No. | Title | Length |
|---|---|---|
| 1. | "Harvey" | 2:54 |
| 2. | "Tibetan Quaaludes" | 7:43 |
| 3. | "Lullaby (Take 2: How Dry I Am)" | 3:15 |
| 4. | "Song 4" | 2:50 |
| 5. | "Site Specific Carnivorous Occurrence" | 8:41 |
| 6. | "Phase 3: Agni Detonating Over the Thar Desert..." | 12:28 |
| 7. | "Thrones and Dominions" | 14:21 |
| 8. | "Song 6 (Chime)" | 2:48 |

== Personnel ==
- Dylan Carlson – guitars, percussion
- Tommy Hansen – guitar
