= Slim Moon =

American musician

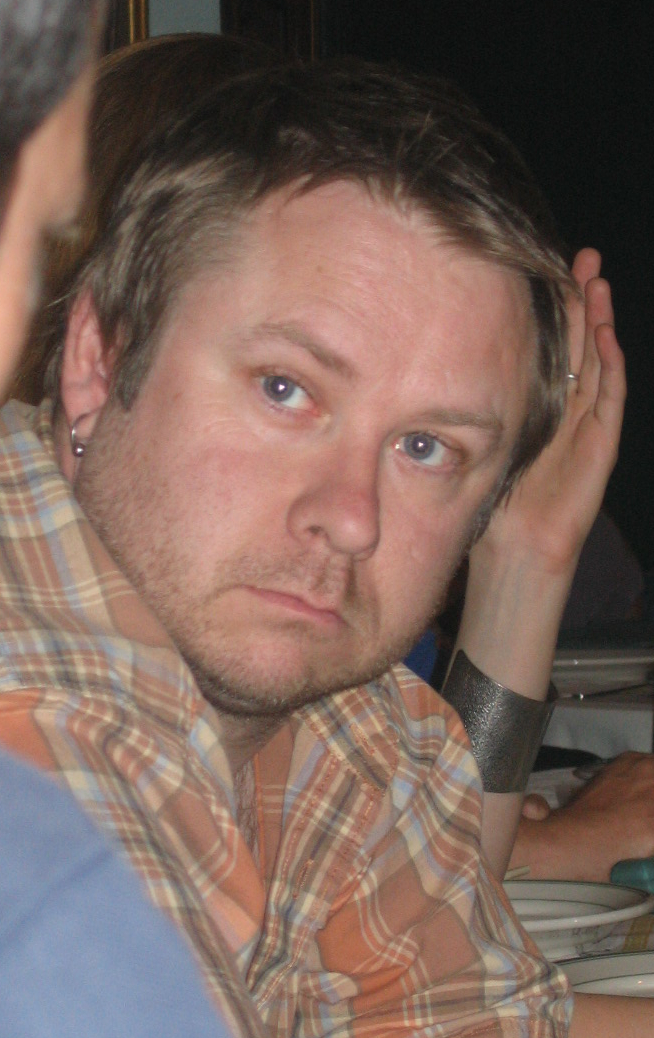
- Moon in 2005

Background information
- Born: Matthew Moon; October 15, 1967 (age 59)
- Origin: Missoula, Montana, USA
- Genre: Indie rock
- Occupations: Musician, minister
- Labels: Kill Rock Stars, 5 Rue Christine, Nonesuch, Rykodisc

Matthew "Slim" Moon (born October 15, 1967) is an American musician and the founder of the American independent music label Kill Rock Stars (KRS). He also started its sister label, 5 Rue Christine. Moon ran KRS from 1991 to 2006, during which time KRS released albums by dozens of artists including Sleater-Kinney, Elliott Smith, the Decemberists, Miranda July, Bikini Kill, Unwound, Huggy Bear, Gossip, and Linda Perry. He was also the co-founding vocalist of Earth, and is associated with the acts Lush and Witchy Poo.

== Life and career ==
Moon graduated from high school in Seattle in 1986. Danny Goldberg has described him as one of "a group of obsessed Melvins fans" who would attend any show the band played within driving distance. Moon says he first met Nirvana frontman Kurt Cobain at one of these shows. He reportedly bonded with Cobain over a shared interest in the punk band Big Black at a party he attended with high school friend Dylan Carlson in East Olympia. Some months later, Moon attended another party where Cobain and Krist Novoselic were playing with Aaron Burckhard on drums. The trio called themselves Skid Row (though Moon says the band's name was still changing frequently.) He began to promote small shows in Olympia and booked Skid Row for one of their first shows, before renaming to Nirvana.

After moving to Olympia, Moon attended Evergreen State College for a short time, remaining in the city due to the thriving music scene. Moon has described Olympia during that era as "a tough place to be seen as cool. It had a rep for being elitist."

=== Management and ministry ===
In October 2006, Moon announced he would be departing from Kill Rock Stars to work as an A&R representative at Nonesuch Records, a Warner Music Group (WMG) subsidiary. Portia Sabin took over ownership of Kill Rock Stars. In June 2007, Moon was laid off from his position at Nonesuch as part of corporate downsizing in WMG. A few days later, Moon was named senior director of A&R and artistic development at Rykodisc, also owned by WMG. Moon left Rykodisc in July 2008 to engage in artist management full-time for Shotclock Management, a company he owns with his wife. He is also a co-founder and the Director of Development for the Portland Folk Festival, which had its inaugural festival in 2010.

In 2014, Moon discussed his new role as a minister with First Unitarian Church in Portland—as well as his departure from the music world—with Oregon Public Broadcasting's radio show State of Wonder. On the topic of his life in the music world then to his life in the ministry now he states, "When I walked away from music. I made a really clean break. I stopped going to shows. Then I walked into the world of ministry, and have sort of made completely new friends, new relationships. Most of the people who knew me for twenty years don't know what I'm doing now, and most of the people I know now have no idea what I did before I got here."

On September 24, 2019, Kill Rock Stars announced Moon's return to manage the label. In February 2022, it was announced that independent music company Exceleration Music had acquired the label's catalog and formed a partnership with him. Under the deal, he would continue to handle A&R and would be actively signing and developing new artists there.
