= Dylan Carlson =

Dylan Carlson may refer to:

- Dylan Carlson (musician) (born 1968), American musician, frontman of the band Earth
- Dylan Carlson (baseball) (born 1998), American baseball outfielder for the Baltimore Orioles
