= Avast! Recording Company =

Music recording studio in Seattle, Washington

- Founded: 1990
- Founder: Stuart Hallerman
- Status: Active
- Genre: Rock, grunge, hard rock, metal
- Location: Seattle, Washington, U.S.

Avast! Recording Company is a music recording studio in Seattle, Washington. It was established in 1990 by producer Stuart Hallerman, who was soundman for Soundgarden and involved in the grunge movement coming out of Seattle at the time. The first CD released by Avast! was Crime Pays When Pigs Die by Nate Mendel and Eric Akre's Christ on a Crutch project, and the company has since worked with a number of other artists, including Screaming Trees, Soundgarden, Built to Spill, Steve Fisk, Bikini Kill, and Supersuckers.

The so-called "Avast! Classic" studio, located at 1325 N 46th St., operated through 2008, and the present studio was set up in 2005 at 601 NW 80th St. and features two separate units: Studios A & B. The use of this building as a studio dates back to 1978, and some rooms are still as they originally were, while others have been modernized.

== Recording history ==
- 1990: Crime Pays When Pigs Die by Christ on a Crutch
- 1990: "Gravity Bill" by Supersuckers
- 1990: "Room A Thousand Years Wide" b/w "H.I.V. Baby" by Soundgarden
- 1990: "Rest In Pieces" by R.I.P.
- 1991: "Rusty Cage" by Soundgarden
- 1992: Steel Mill by Willard
- 1992: Pussy Whipped by Bikini Kill
- 1992: Frenching the Bully by The Gits
- 1992: Chow Down by 7 Year Bitch
- 1993: Earth 2: Special Low Frequency Version by Earth
- 1994: New Plastic Ideas by Unwound
- 1994: Vulgaris by Vulgaris
- 1995: "Fell On Black Days" by Soundgarden
- 1996: The American Fadeout by Stuntman
- 1997: The Lonesome Crowded West by Modest Mouse
- 1997: Perfect from Now On by Built to Spill
- 1998: The Hot Rock by Sleater-Kinney
- 2001: Space Country by Neo
- 2003: Transatlanticism by Death Cab For Cutie
- 2005: Plans by Death Cab For Cutie
- 2006: Everything All the Time by Band Of Horses
- 2007: Cease To Begin by Band Of Horses
- 2007: Fleet Foxes by Fleet Foxes
- 2008: We Are Beautiful, We Are Doomed by Los Campesinos!
- 2008: The Lucky Ones by Mudhoney
- 2012: The Heist by Macklemore & Ryan Lewis
- 2014: Primitive and Deadly by Earth
- 2015: Twelvefour by The Paper Kites
- 2020: Making a Door Less Open by Car Seat Headrest
- 2023: Routine for Now by The Whags
- 2024: Rose Peak by Rose Peak

== See also ==
- Grunge
