= Rilly Groovy =

Single by Beautiful People

from the album If 60's Were 90's
- Released: 1993
- Genre: House, breaks, techno
- Label: Essential Records
- Songwriter: Du Kane/Luke Baldry
- Producer: Du Kane/Luke Baldry

"Rilly Groovy" is a 1993 song by Beautiful People. Released as the second single from their 1993 album If 60's Were 90's, the song reached #3 on the Hot Dance Club Songs chart.

== Background ==
The song was written by group leader Du Kane and Luke Baldry with the programming done by Baldry at Kane's mother's house in Sussex. Like the rest of Rilly Groovy's parent album If 60's Were 90's, the song extensively samples the works of Jimi Hendrix; Rilly Groovy samples guitar from "Wild Thing", "Up the Road" and "Bleeding Heart", and bass guitar and spoken words from Jimi Plays Monterey.

The sample used for the guitar solo, like the others on the album, was a multitrack solo; although the group had permission to raid Jimi Hendrix's archive and indeed did do for the song's solo, most of the album's samples were taken from CD to show how much could be done. However, Rilly Groovy's solo posed an extra challenge as the drumming used in the source solo was non-metronomic, with Mitch Mitchell starting at about 100bpm and rising to 140bpm; Baldry's response was to cut it into about 20 different chunks each on the left and right, reorder them, and then replay them across the beat.

== Music video ==
A music video was produced for the song. It was shot at the now-defunct Fungus Mungus in Battersea, although since many of the samples were originally taken from Jimi Plays Monterey, so too was the corresponding video.

== Chart performance ==
Rilly Groovy charted at No. 3 in the US Billboard Hot Dance Club Songs chart; on the back of this, If 60's Was 90's was re-released and peaked at No. 74 on the UK Singles Chart, and No. 5 on the Hot Dance Club Songs chart.
