= Hibernaculum (album) =

Studio album by Earth
- Released: March 20, 2007
- Recorded: 2006 in Aleph Studios
- Genre: Drone doom; post-rock; post-metal
- Length: 36:45
- Label: Southern Lord (SUNN74)
- Producer: Randall Dunn

Earth chronology
Hex; Or Printing in the Infernal Method (2005)	Hibernaculum (2007)	The Bees Made Honey in the Lion's Skull (2008)

Professional ratings
Review scores
Source	Rating
AllMusic	3.5/5 stars
Pitchfork	7.8/10
Scene Point Blank	8.8/10

Hibernaculum is a 2007 studio album by the American musical group Earth, though acknowledged as an EP by the band. All of the songs, except for "A Plague of Angels", are older Earth songs that were re-recorded in the country-influenced style of Hex. The album includes a DVD with a documentary by Seldon Hunt, called "Within the Drone". Both "Coda Maestoso in F (Flat) Minor" and a "A Plague of Angels" appear in the documentary, "The Wild and Wonderful Whites of West Virginia".

== Track listing ==
No.	Title	Length
1.	"Ouroboros is Broken"	8:17
2.	"Coda Maestoso in F (Flat) Minor"	6:52
3.	"Miami Morning Coming Down"	5:15
4.	"A Plague of Angels"	16:21

== Credits ==
- Dylan Carlson – guitar
- Adrienne Davies – drums, percussion
- Don McGreevy – bass guitar, upright bass
- Greg Anderson – Korg ms-20 bass
- Steve Moore – trombone, Hammond B-3, Mellotron, Wurlitzer electric piano
- Randall Dunn – low drone
- Stephen O'Malley and Seldon Hunt – art direction
- Seldon Hunt — photography and text
- Jason Evans – Carlson portraiture
- Mell Dettmer – mastering at Sinister Kitchen
