= Sunn Amps and Smashed Guitars =

Live album by Earth
- Released: 1995 (re-released in 2001 on No Quarter Records)
- Recorded: Track 1: May 1995; Tracks 2–5: Oct 1990
- Genre: Drone metal
- Length: 54:17
- Label: Blast First; No Quarter

Earth chronology
Phase 3: Thrones and Dominions (1995)	Sunn Amps and Smashed Guitars (1995)	Pentastar: In the Style of Demons (1996)

Professional ratings
Review scores
Source	Rating
Allmusic	link

Sunn Amps and Smashed Guitars is a live album by Earth, originally released in 1995 by Blast First Records. It contained the track "Ripped on Fascist Ideas", recorded in London in May 1995. It was re-released in 2001 by No Quarter Records with four bonus tracks taken from a 1990 demo. Kurt Cobain and Kelly Canary contribute guest vocals on the track "Divine and Bright".

== Track listing ==
No.	Title	Length
1.	"Ripped on Fascist Ideas"	31:19
2.	"Geometry of Murder"	7:22
3.	"German Dental Work"	5:20
4.	"Divine and Bright"	3:02
5.	"Dissolution 1"	7:11

== Personnel ==
- Dylan Carlson – vocals, guitar
- Ian Dickson – bass guitar, guitar on "Ripped On Fascist Ideas"
- Dave Harwell – bass guitar
- Joe Preston – bass guitar, drum machine
- Kurt Cobain – guest vocals on "Divine and Bright"
- Kelly Canary – guest vocals on "Divine and Bright"
