= Lake (American band) =

American indie pop band

LAKE
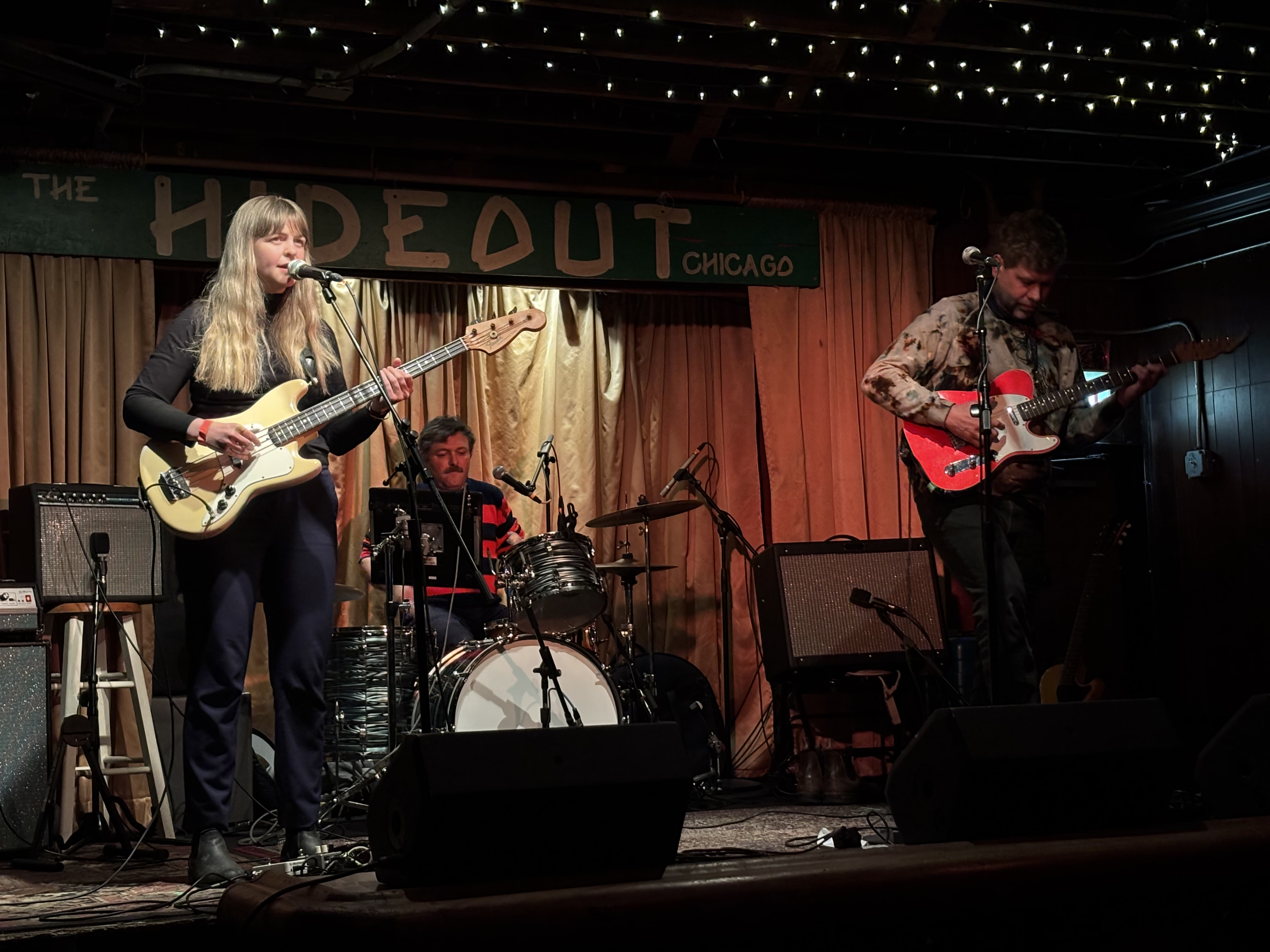
- LAKE performing in 2025

Background information
- Origin: Olympia, Washington, U.S.
- Genres: Indie pop, indie rock
- Years active: 2005–present
- Labels: Don Giovanni; Off Tempo; K; Tapete; Human Sounds; Funkytonk
- Members: Ashley Eriksson; Eli Moore; Andrew Dorsett
- Past members: Lindsay Schief; Kenny Tarantino; Adam Oelsner; Markly Morrison
- Website: laketheband.com

LAKE (which stands for the founding members Lindsay, Ashley, Kenny, and Eli) is an American indie pop band, based in Langley, Washington. They are currently signed to Don Giovanni Records.

== History ==
Formed in 2005, in Olympia, Washington, they are best known for composing the end song to the Cartoon Network show Adventure Time, titled "Christmas Island" or "The Island Song" (written by Ashley Eriksson). A version of the song was featured on their fourth album, Let's Build a Roof. Other Adventure Time episodes featured their songs "No Wonder I," "I Look Up To You," and "Greatly Appreciated."

On August 22, 2015, the band celebrated their 10-year anniversary by playing all their albums from start to finish in a 12-hour marathon set at Bayview Hall, Whidbey Island, Washington.

Their eleventh and most recent album, Bucolic Gone, was released on March 7, 2025.

== Musical style ==
Lake features male and female vocals backed by guitars, keyboards and occasionally horns. AllMusic referred to Lake as being "one of several brainy and sweet indie pop bands... to call the Pacific Northwest their home." These characteristics were also noted in their reviews by Pitchfork Media. Like many artists on K Records, their style is lo-fi.

== Album overview ==
Album	Title	Songs	Length	Label	Release date
1	First Album	12	46:10	Kelp! Monthly	July 19, 2006
2	Cassette	8	25:51	Funkytonk Records/Brown Interiour Music	October 1, 2006
3	Oh, the Places We'll Go	10	26:47	K Records	October 10, 2008
4	Let's Build a Roof	12	36:44	K Records	October 6, 2009 (reissued April 19, 2024)
5	Giving and Receiving	14	40:34	K Records	April 5, 2011
6	Circular Doorway	10	34:07	Funkytonk Records/Water Islands Records	July 17, 2013
7	The World is Real	11	44:19	K Records	September 17, 2013
8	Forever or Never	12	48:31	Tapete Records	April 7, 2017
9	Practice Space	10	33:51	Human Sounds Records	February 3, 2020
10	Roundelay	11	46:24	Off Tempo Records	April 24, 2020
11	Bucolic Gone	10	38:58	Don Giovanni Records	March 7, 2025

== Studio albums ==
- First Album (July 19, 2006)

No.	Title	Length
1.	"Without Devotion"	2:16
2.	"Widower"	5:23
3.	"Behave"	2:39
4.	"Helicopter"	4:37
5.	"Mountain"	2:50
6.	"I Look Up to You"	3:03
7.	"Ice Scream"	5:19
8.	"L. M. J."	3:49
9.	"Happy Man"	4:00
10.	"Moving Roads"	2:32
11.	"Alibi"	2:28
12.	"Wedding Days"	7:14
Total length:		46:10

- Cassette (October 1, 2006)

No.	Title	Length
1.	"Recognize"	3:05
2.	"River"	5:05
3.	"Emotionally"	2:59
4.	"Fantasy/Reality"	2:29
5.	"Higher than Merry"	2:13
6.	"You Are Alone"	2:58
7.	"Lindy"	3:35
8.	"Kite"	3:27
Total length:		25:51

- Oh, The Places We'll Go (October 10, 2008)

No.	Title	Length
1.	"Oh, the Places"	2:47
2.	"Blue Ocean Blue"	3:32
3.	"Counting"	2:50
4.	"Bad Dream"	4:01
5.	"Minor Trip"	2:09
6.	"Dead Beat"	2:14
7.	"Heaven"	2:39
8.	"On the Swing"	3:07
9.	"Oh, the Places Two"	2:39
10.	"Secret Track"	0:49
Total length:		26:47

- Let's Build a Roof (October 6, 2009)

No.	Title	Length
1.	"Breathing"	3:54
2.	"Gravel"	3:17
3.	"Madagascar"	3:13
4.	"Sing 99 & 90"	3:46
5.	"Acorn"	2:35
6.	"The Roof Caves In"	2:01
7.	"Loose Wind"	2:46
8.	"Winking Sign"	2:39
9.	"Remote Control Cars"	3:41
10.	"Don't Give Up"	4:14
11.	"Christmas Island"	2:30
12.	"Collapsing Homes"	2:08
Total length:		36:44

- Giving and Receiving (April 5, 2011)

No.	Title	Length
1.	"Intro"	0:50
2.	"One Small Step"	2:39
3.	"Roger Miller"	4:41
4.	"Within/Without"	2:27
5.	"The Stars"	1:06
6.	"Stumble Around"	1:47
7.	"Giving & Receiving"	4:30
8.	"Mother Nature's Promise"	4:18
9.	"Skeleton Costume"	3:57
10.	"Bird and the Berry"	3:46
11.	"Interlude"	1:16
12.	"Pilgrim's Day"	3:43
13.	"Efforts"	2:52
14.	"Distant Stars"	2:42
Total length:		40:34

- Circular Doorway (July 17, 2013)

No.	Title	Length
1.	"Circular Doorway"	3:03
2.	"What You See is What You Get"	3:18
3.	"Don't Hate Yourself"	3:58
4.	"Crying Room"	3:07
5.	"Positive Warning"	3:28
6.	"No Wonder I"	3:07
7.	"Torpedoes"	4:35
8.	"Relief"	3:42
9.	"Yawrood"	2:09
10.	"Alone"	3:40
Total length:		34:07

- The World is Real (September 17, 2013)

No.	Title	Length
1.	"Do You Recall?"	6:32
2.	"Bury the House"	2:46
3.	"Combat Culture"	2:54
4.	"Composure"	3:26
5.	"Go Back"	4:17
6.	"Dog in the Desert"	4:50
7.	"Perfect Fit"	3:19
8.	"Takin' My Time"	4:44
9.	"I Wish for You"	3:50
10.	"In the Stubborn Eyes of a Demon"	3:24
11.	"Reconcile"	4:17
Total length:		44:19

- Forever or Never (April 7, 2017)

No.	Title	Length
1.	"Turn Around"	4:07
2.	"On the Swing"	3:17
3.	"Work with What You Got"	3:39
4.	"Give Back"	4:21
5.	"Gone Against the Wind"	2:44
6.	"Trouble"	5:08
7.	"Christian Comedians"	5:03
8.	"Over/Under"	3:20
9.	"Push and Pull"	4:11
10.	"Forever or Never"	4:49
11.	"We Can Work It Out"	4:22
12.	"Magazine"	3:30
Total length:		48:31

- Practice Space (February 3, 2020)

No.	Title	Length
1.	"Love Will Linger On"	3:30
2.	"Backstroke"	4:53
3.	"It’s Alright, Maisy (Down at the Goldrush)"	4:16
4.	"My Time, Your Time"	2:57
5.	"Just As the Tide Was Flowing"	3:16
6.	"Dreamin'"	3:05
7.	"Best Love"	1:53
8.	"Ideas Make Ideas"	2:44
9.	"American Dream"	2:26
10.	"Not Today"	4:51
Total length:		33:51

- Roundelay (April 24, 2020)

No.	Title	Length
1.	"Roundelay"	3:54
2.	"She Plays One Chord"	4:25
3.	"Resolution"	4:44
4.	"Forgiveness"	3:20
5.	"Bubble"	3:30
6.	"Don't Pray For Me"	4:17
7.	"Without It"	5:05
8.	"Hanged Man"	3:50
9.	"Talons & Feathers"	4:34
10.	"Tell Me What Is True Love"	3:36
11.	"Cup Sludge"	5:13
Total length:		46:24

- Bucolic Gone (March 7, 2025)

No.	Title	Length
1.	"Bucolic Gone"	3:46
2.	"Ferrari"	4:03
3.	"Airplane"	4:47
4.	"Glad Rags"	3:29
5.	"Love Is Deeper Now"	5:38
6.	"Blue Horizon"	4:48
7.	"My Dear Brother"	2:20
8.	"The Way Old Friends Do"	3:48
9.	"Wonderful Sunlight"	3:42
10.	"No Wonder I"	4:37
Total length:		38:58
