= If 60's Were 90's =

Studio album by Beautiful People
- Released: 1994
- Genre: Pop; rock; electronic
- Length: 44:40
- Label: Continuum Records
- Producer: Duncan Kane, Luke Baldry, Pely

If 60's Were 90's is an album by techno-dance band Beautiful People featuring numerous samples from Jimi Hendrix songs. It spawned the hits "Rilly Groovy," which reached number three on the Hot Dance Club Songs chart and the title track "If 60's Were 90's", which reached number 74 on the UK Singles Chart and number five on the Hot Dance Club Songs chart.

== Critical reception ==
The Los Angeles Times called it an "inspired piece of grave-digging".

== Track listing ==
All songs written by Du Kane and Luke Baldry.

No.	Title	Samples used	Length
1.	"Comin' to Get You"	Guitar from "Voodoo Child (Slight Return)", "Peace in Mississippi", "I Don't Live Today" and "Foxy Lady"; Vocals from "Foxy Lady"	5:08
2.	"Get Your Mind Together"	Guitar from "1983... (A Merman I Should Turn to Be)"; Bass guitar from "EXP"; Vocals from "Voodoo Chile", "The Stars That Play with Laughing Sam's Dice" and "Are You Experienced?,"; Guitar and vocals from "Spanish Castle Magic" and "Love or Confusion"	5:05
3.	"If 60's Was 90's"	Guitar from "Voodoo Chile"; Vocals from "If 6 Was 9"; Spoken vocals from The Dick Cavett Show	6:11
4.	"Stone Crazy"	Guitar from both versions of "Voodoo Chile"; Vocals from "Spanish Castle Magic" and "Purple Haze"; Guitar and vocals from "Ezy Ryder"	3:15
5.	"Rilly Groovy"	Guitar from "Wild Thing", "Up the Road" and "Bleeding Heart"; Bass guitar from Jimi Plays Monterey	4:45
6.	"Happiness on the Wind"	Guitar from "Belly Button Window" and "The Wind Cries Mary"; Vocals from "Hear My Train A Comin'" and "The Wind Cries Mary"	5:06
7.	"Sock It to Me"	Guitar from "Killing Floor"; Guitar and vocals from "The Wind Cries Mary"	4:23
8.	"Feel the Heat"	Crowd noise from "Voodoo Child (Slight Return)", "My Friend" and "The Stars That Play with Laughing Sam's Dice"; Vocals from 'The Stars That Play with Laughing Sam's Dice" and "Long Hot Summer Night"; Guitar from "Long Hot Summer Night"; Bass guitar from Jimi Plays Berkeley	5:02
9.	"The Sea... Eventually"	Guitar from "1983... (A Merman I Should Turn to Be)", "Castles Made of Sand", "Hey Baby (New Rising Sun)", and "Have You Ever Been (To Electric Ladyland)"; Vocals from "May This Be Love", "Pali Gap", "Hey Baby" and "God Save the Queen"	5:45
Total length:			44:40
