= The Bees Made Honey in the Lion's Skull =

Fifth full-length studio album by the American musical group Earth

Studio album by Earth
- Released: February 26, 2008
- Recorded: Avast/Aleph Studios
- Genre: Rock
- Length: 53:25
- Label: Southern Lord (SUNN90)
- Producer: Randall Dunn

Earth chronology
Hibernaculum (2007)	The Bees Made Honey in the Lion's Skull (2008)	Angels of Darkness, Demons of Light I (2011)

Professional ratings
Review scores
Source	Rating
AllMusic	4/5 stars
The A.V. Club	A
BBC	(favorable)
The Guardian	4/5 stars
Pitchfork	7.7/10
PopMatters	7/10 stars
The Quietus	9/10
Tiny Mix Tapes	4.5/5 stars

The Bees Made Honey in the Lion's Skull is the fifth full-length studio album by the American musical group Earth.

The 2008 album continues bandleader Dylan Carlson's creative evolution away from the experimental drone-grunge-metal output of their earlier work. The music on Bees still features the band's trademark slower tempos and gradually developed melodic themes, but has influence from jazz, country and western, and film music. Unlike previous material, Hammond organ and acoustic piano is prominently featured on this album.

Earth embarked on a worldwide tour in support of the album.

Bill Frisell is a guest on the album, playing guitar on tracks one, four, and five.

The title is a reference to Judges 14:8 in the Bible. It tells the story of Samson, who tore apart a lion and when he returned, noticed a swarm of bees and some honey on the lion's carcass. The album continues the partial trend of Earth material being influenced by Cormac McCarthy's Blood Meridian, with certain songs named after phrases from the book (for example, "Hung from the Moon" and "Engine of Ruin").

== Track listing ==
No.	Title	Length
1.	"Omens and Portents I: The Driver"	9:06
2.	"Rise to Glory"	5:47
3.	"Miami Morning Coming Down II (Shine)"	8:01
4.	"Engine of Ruin"	6:28
5.	"Omens and Portents II: Carrion Crow"	8:04
6.	"Hung from the Moon"	7:44
7.	"The Bees Made Honey in the Lion's Skull"	8:15
8.	"Junkyard Priest" (Vinyl bonus track)	7:13

== Personnel ==
Per the liner notes

Earth

- Dylan Carlson – electric guitars, amplifier
- Steve Moore – acoustic grand piano, Hammond organ, Wurlitzer electric piano
- Don McGreevy – bass guitar, double bass
- Adrienne Davies – drums, percussion

Guest musicians

- Bill Frisell – electric guitar on tracks 1, 4, and 5
- Milky Burgess – slide guitar on "Junkyard Priest"

Production

- Randall Dunn – basic tracks recorded at Avast, all other recording and mixing at Aleph Studios
- Sinister Kitchen – mastering
- Mell Detmer – mastering
- Arik Roper – artwork
- Seldon Hunt – layout
