= Andrew Earles =

American music journalist

Andrew Earles is a music journalist. He is the author of the book Gimme Indie Rock. He has written articles for Paste, The A.V. Club Spin, and Memphis Flyer.
