= Adrienne Davies =

American drummer

- Genres: Psychedelic rock, drone metal
- Occupation: Musician
- Instruments: Drums, percussion

Adrienne Davies is the drummer and percussionist of the post-rock band Earth.

Davies is credited as drummer on all of Earth's albums since 2001. They range from Living in the Gleam of an Unsheathed Sword (2005) to drums, percussion, and wind chimes on Hex (Or Printing in the Infernal Method) (2005). She has since played on its album Hibernaculum, as well as Altar—the Sunn O))) and Boris collaboration—which also features other members of Earth. She was also the drummer for their most recent album, Full Upon Her Burning Lips, released in 2019.

Davies' drumming style is heavily influenced by Dylan Carlson's pioneering drone metal sound, with Michael McDaniel as the band's drummer in the 1990s. Some of her other influences include Jim Keltner, Tony Williams, and Jack DeJohnette.

== Discography (partial) ==
- 2003: 070796 Live
- 2005: Living in the Gleam of an Unsheathed Sword
- 2005: Hex (Or Printing in the Infernal Method)
- 2006: Altar
- 2007: Hibernaculum
- 2008: The Bees Made Honey in the Lion's Skull
- 2011: Angels of Darkness, Demons of Light I
- 2012: Angels of Darkness, Demons of Light II
- 2014: Primitive and Deadly
- 2019: Full upon Her Burning Lips
