= Pentastar: In the Style of Demons =

Studio album by Earth
- Released: July 23, 1996
- Recorded: 1996
- Genre: Doom metal; drone metal; stoner rock
- Length: 43:12
- Label: Sub Pop
- Producer: Earth

Earth chronology
Sunn Amps and Smashed Guitars (1995)	Pentastar: In the Style of Demons (1996)	070796 Live (2003)

Professional ratings
Review scores
Source	Rating
AllMusic	1.5/5 stars

Pentastar: In the Style of Demons is the third studio album by the drone metal band Earth, released in 1996. It has a more rock-oriented sound than their earlier drone doom work, although in a very minimalist style. "Peace in Mississippi" is a cover of the Jimi Hendrix song. The original vinyl release of the album has an alternative take of "Peace in Mississippi".

The car depicted on the cover is a "Sassy Grass Green" Plymouth Barracuda, with the car's iconic hockey-stick decal modified to say "Earth." The "Pentastar" named in the album title is an apparent reference to the brand logo of Chrysler, parent company of Plymouth, and also a reference to the fact that it is the fifth release by Earth.

== Critical reception ==
Rolling Stone wrote that "'Introduction' and 'Coda Maestoso in F(flat) Minor', which frame the album, are robust, majestic, Black Sabbath-esque riffs transformed into symphonic hot-rod music." The Gazette declared: "As long as there are wood-paneled suburban basements, heavy amps, delinquent parents, quaaludes and beer, there will be a planet of Earths."

== Track listing ==
All songs written by Dylan Carlson, except where noted.

No.	Title	Music	Length
1.	"Introduction"		5:15
2.	"High Command"		5:50
3.	"Crooked Axis for String Quartet"	Sean McElligot	5:29
4.	"Tallahassee"		3:50
5.	"Charioteer (Temple Song)"	Ian Dickson	4:17
6.	"Peace in Mississippi"	Jimi Hendrix	5:56
7.	"Sonar and Depth Charge"		7:13
8.	"Coda Maestoso in F (Flat) Minor"		5:19

== Personnel ==
- Dylan Carlson – vocals, guitar, vibraphone, piano
- Ian Dickson – bass guitar, guitar
- Sean McElligot – guitar
- Michael Deming – organ
- Michael McDaniel - drums
