= Full upon Her Burning Lips =

Studio album by Earth
- Released: May 24, 2019
- Studio: Studio Soil
- Genre: Drone doom
- Length: 62:50
- Label: Sargent House
- Producers: Earth, Mell Dettmer

Earth chronology
Primitive and Deadly (2014)	Full upon Her Burning Lips (2019)

Full upon Her Burning Lips is the ninth studio album by American band Earth. It was released on May 24, 2019, through Sargent House.

In support of the album, the band announced a US tour from May 24, 2019, to June 29, 2019, with Helms Alee as a support act. The first single from the album, "Cats on the Briar" was released March 6, 2019.

== Critical reception ==
Professional ratings
Aggregate scores
Source	Rating
AnyDecentMusic?	7.3/10
Metacritic	79/100
Review scores
Source	Rating
AllMusic	4/5 stars
Pitchfork	7.8/10
Spectrum Culture	3.5/5 stars
The Spill Magazine	2/5 stars
Under the Radar	7.5/10

Full upon Her Burning Lips was met with generally favorable reviews from critics. At Metacritic, which assigns a weighted average rating out of 100 to reviews from mainstream publications, this release received an average score of 79, based on 12 reviews

=== Accolades ===
Accolades for Full upon Her Burning Lips
Publication	Accolade	Rank	Ref.
Louder Than War	Top 50 Albums of 2019	38	

== Track listing ==
No.	Title	Length
1.	"Datura's Crimson Veils"	12:15
2.	"Exaltation of Larks"	3:19
3.	"Cats on the Briar"	5:56
4.	"The Colour of Poison"	5:31
5.	"Descending Belladonna"	5:11
6.	"She Rides an Air of Malevolence"	11:27
7.	"Maidens Catafalque"	2:49
8.	"An Unnatural Carousel"	6:51
9.	"The Mandrake's Hymn"	5:03
10.	"A Wretched Country of Dusk"	4:28
Total length:		62:50

== Charts ==
Chart performance for Full upon Her Burning Lips
Chart (2019)	Peak position
US Independent Albums (Billboard)	17
US Heatseekers Albums (Billboard)	1
