= Hex; Or Printing in the Infernal Method =

Studio album by Earth
- Released: October 23, 2005
- Recorded: March–May 2005
- Genre: Post-metal
- Length: 46:29; 61:35 (vinyl version)
- Label: Southern Lord (SUNN48)
- Producer: Randall Dunn

Earth chronology
Legacy of Dissolution (2005)	Hex; Or Printing in the Infernal Method (2005)	Hibernaculum (2007)

Hex; Or Printing in the Infernal Method is the fourth full-length studio album by American drone rock band Earth.

== Background ==
Marking a new direction the band would follow in years to come, Hex stands in stark contrast to Earth's previous works. While retaining the extremely heavy doom/drone metal song structure of epic riffs over simple repetitive drum beats, the guitar was inflected with country influences that favored a cleaner reverb-heavy tone layered with acoustic instruments over the band's previous predilection for distortion. The press release cited diverse influences such as Ennio Morricone, Billy Gibbons, Neil Young's soundtrack to the movie Dead Man, country musicians Duane Eddy, Merle Haggard, and Roy Buchanan. Bandleader Dylan Carlson indicated that he viewed this shift as part of a continuum rather than a categorical change in direction:

I view music as a continuum and there're different faces that it takes. This is not a genre record. I don't do genre. I've always listened to that music, it's the main thing I'm listening to now. You know, they're the guitar players I admire and they also have, for example, the banjo rolls, going back to the open string, the drone...Basically with all the music I like, the drone is always present. Someone might look at my records and say it's schizophrenic, but there's always that element I hear. Maybe it's delusional, but it makes sense to me, I guess. It's like the Hindu gods where they have all these different incarnations but it's still the same force behind it.

The album was influenced by Cormac McCarthy, particularly his novel Blood Meridian. Every song title on the album is named after a phrase found in the text of the novel. Carlson commented that:

That's the one [Blood Meridian] that's the most violent or occult, but all of his books deal with that theme of the West and the frontier and its violence and effects. It's more about capturing that sense of place. As someone born in America, I definitely consider myself a product of the frontier and the history of it has influenced me. This whole vast continent and these "peoples": "Indians", the white man, they were all forced to deal with this place, an environment that was harsh and demanding and it forced people to react to it in a certain way. Like the "hex" sign itself - the Mennonites are normally super God-fearing people, but when they came to American they had to invent these signs to keep evil spirits away. There's this need to protect themselves from this entity that inhabits the landscape...everything was violent and hard, everyone was violent.

Carlson said that "There's an arc to each song and an arc to the album, rather than just a collection of songs. There's silence and a sense of space to the music". The subtitle is from William Blake's The Marriage of Heaven and Hell. It was well received by fans of the band and critics alike despite the change in sound.

When asked about the elimination of distortion, Carlson remarked:

I don't know if it's because I've got cleaner living or not, but the sound that I hear in my head is cleaner now. There's always some harmonic distortion when you have an amplified sound, I mean if you had a pure electric guitar tone it would be pretty uninspiring, but I just started to want to hear more of the resonance of the wood and the metal of the instrument...Sometimes I think that with Earth, although there's not a lot going on because of the distortion and the saturation, it can be quite tiring. I wanted there to be space [on Hex], so the music breathes.

== Reception ==
Professional ratings
Review scores
Source	Rating
AllMusic	3.5/5 stars
Chronicles of Chaos	9.5/10
Exclaim!	(favorable)
Pitchfork	8.2/10

Critics acknowledged the sharp transformation in the band's sound and were generally favorable towards Hex. Writing for Pitchfork, Austin Gaines described the album as a "surprisingly beautiful instrumental album" that exchanged distorted riffing for "the austere beauty of a telecaster roaming the Western U.S." In Exclaim!, Kevin Hainey praised the album as "an elegant and singular effort filled with sparsely beautiful passages that lead headlong into the void". Within the band's stylistic transformation, Todd DePalma observed in Chronicles of Chaos "a stripped, damn near ossified sound that yields a more conceptual - and by far the heaviest - album of [Earth's] storied lifespan".

== Track listing ==
No.	Title	Length
1.	"Mirage"	1:45
2.	"Land of Some Other Order"	7:18
3.	"The Dire and Ever Circling Wolves"	7:34
4.	"Left in the Desert"	1:13
5.	"Lens of Unrectified Night"	7:56
6.	"An Inquest Concerning Teeth"	5:16
7.	"Raiford (The Felon Wind)"	7:21
8.	"The Dry Lake"	3:21
9.	"Tethered to the Polestar"	4:42
10.	"Untitled" (vinyl-only bonus track)	15:03

== Personnel ==
- Dylan Carlson – guitar, banjo, baritone guitar
- Adrienne Davies – drums, percussion, wind chime
- John Schuller – bass guitar
- Dan Tyack – lap and pedal steel guitar
- Steve Moore – trombone, tubular bells
- Randall Dunn – production, harmonica, recording
