= Beautiful People (band) =

- Origin: UK
- Genres: Pop/rock/electronic
- Years active: 1990s-present
- Labels: Essential Records
- Members: Du Kane; Luke Baldry; Robin Goodridge

Beautiful People are a British techno-dance group. They are best known for blending sampled guitar sounds by Jimi Hendrix with dance music.

== History ==
Beautiful People began as three friends in the late 1980's playing house and dance music in London area clubs. Seeking a more vibrant sound and frustrated with the lack of guitar in current music, they hit on the bold idea of sampling the music of guitar legend Jimi Hendrix.

Aware that they would face licensing issues, they made three demo songs then sought counsel with Eric Clapton. He got them in touch with creative head of the Jimi Hendrix Estate, record producer Alan Douglas.He commissioned the band and gave them access to the music. The result was the hit If 60's were 90's.

Having been granted permission to sample any Jimi Hendrix song they wished, they released "If 60's Was 90's". Originally released in 1992 in just the United Kingdom, a similarly named album, If 60's Were 90's, was also issued.

In 1993, they released "Rilly Groovy", which reached No. 3 in the United States Billboard Hot Dance Club Songs chart; on the back of this, "If 60's Was 90's" was re-released and peaked at No. 74 on the UK Singles Chart, and No. 5 on the Hot Dance Club Songs chart.

In 2012, Beautiful People hit No. 100 in the UK with a pre-release cover version of "Turn Up the Music" by Chris Brown.

== Members ==
1989-1998 Duncan "Du Kane" Kane -guitar / backing vocals Luke Baldry -keyboards / drum programming / backing vocals Robin Goodridge -drums / percussion.
