= Essential Records (London) =

British sub record label to London Records

Essential Records is a subsidiary of London Records and is an offshoot of Pete Tong's Essential Selection programme on Radio 1.

The later originated US label, run by London-Sire Records from 2000 to 2001, released dance music compilations from well-known DJs and artists including Paul Oakenfold, Fatboy Slim, Carl Cox, Pete Heller, John Digweed, Boy George, DJ Skribble, DJ Icey, and Peter Rauhofer.

== See also ==
- List of record labels
