= Gimme Indie Rock (book) =

Book by Andrew Earles

Gimme Indie Rock: 500 Essential American Underground Rock Albums 1981–1996
- Author: Andrew Earles
- Language: English
- Subject: Albums; capsule review; discography; music journalism; indie music
- Publisher: Voyageur Press
- Publication date: September 15, 2014
- Publication place: United States
- Media type: Print
- Pages: 400
- ISBN: 978-0-7603-4648-8

Gimme Indie Rock: 500 Essential American Underground Rock Albums 1981–1996 is a music reference book by American music journalist Andrew Earles. It was published on September 15, 2014, by Voyageur Press, an imprint of Quarto Publishing Group.

== Reception ==
Gimme Indie Rock has received generally favorable reviews from critics. Spectrum Culture scored the album 3 out of 5, stating that it was more of a "useful reference [...] than a consistently enjoyable read, but that usefulness may well lead you to great music you’ve never heard before." Consequence called it an "infinitely readable guide". PopMatters critic Kevin Korber gave the album 6 out of 10. He said that it was "hard to say if the book itself is essential, though many of the albums it covers are", but praised Earles' enthusiasm and concluded that he "wrote this book for the right reasons, and he’s sure to find an audience receptive to his take on this era of American music." Mark Dober of Maximumrocknroll said that Earles' reviews "do a good job of putting [its] records in context to their timeframes and scenes", and that it offered "a good cross section of the indie music of [its] era".

== See also ==
- Album era
- All Time Top 1000 Albums
- Our Band Could Be Your Life
- Rolling Stone's 500 Greatest Albums of All Time
- 1,000 Recordings to Hear Before You Die
