= Earth (American band) =

American musical group

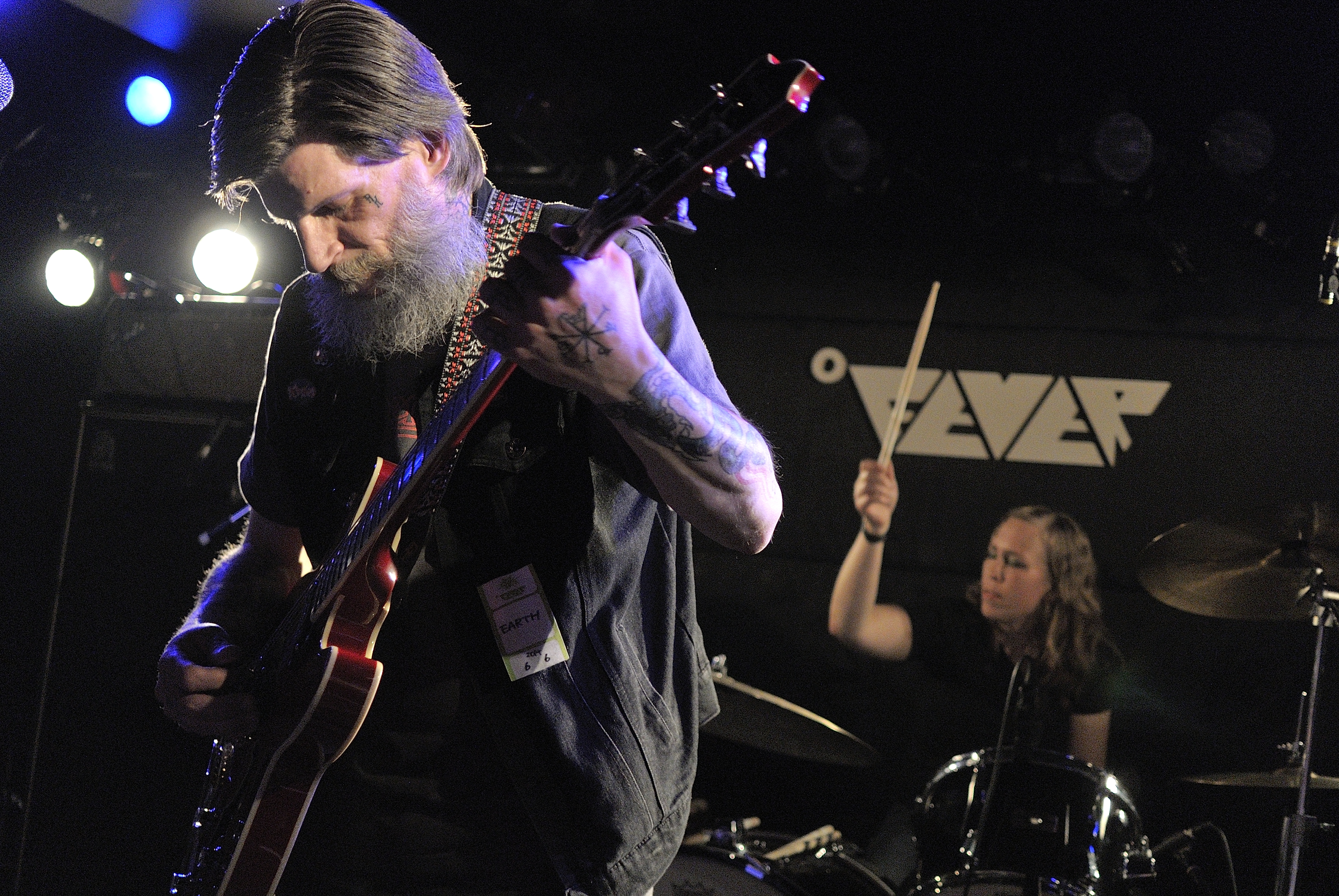
- Earth perform live in 2014: Dylan Carlson (left) and Adrienne Davies.

Background information
- Origin: Olympia, Washington, U.S.
- Genres: Post-rock; drone metal; drone; psychedelic rock; instrumental rock
- Years active: 1989–1997, 2003–present
- Labels: Sub Pop; No Quarter; Or; Southern Lord; Blast First/Mute; Sargent House; Fire
- Members: Dylan Carlson; Adrienne Davies
- Past members: List: Slim Moon; Greg Babior; Joe Preston; Ian Dickson; Dave Harwell; Sean McElligot; John Schuller; Michael McDaniel; Jonas Haskins; Don McGreevy; Steve Moore; Brett Netson; Angelina Baldoz; Karl Blau; Lori Goldston; Bill Herzog
- Website: earthseattle.com

Earth is an American rock band originally based in Olympia, Washington, and led by the guitarist Dylan Carlson. Initially active between 1989 and 1997, their early work is characterized by heavily distorted guitar, drones, and lengthy, minimalist song structures; their 1993 debut album Earth 2 is recognized as a pioneering work of the drone metal genre. The band resurfaced in the early 2000s, with their subsequent output reducing the distortion and incorporating elements of country, jazz rock, and folk. Earth's current lineup consists of Carlson and drummer Adrienne Davies. Often Bill Herzog is on bass as well as other Earth members, past present and future.

== History ==
Dylan Carlson founded the band in 1989 along with Slim Moon and Greg Babior, taking the title "Earth" from Black Sabbath's prior name. Carlson has remained the core of the band's line-up throughout its changes. At the time of Earth's formation, Carlson was conceptually influenced by minimalist composers such as La Monte Young as well the bands King Crimson and Slayer.

Earth 2 was described as a "milestone" by Terrorizer's Dayal Patterson, which he described as "a three-track, 75 minute deluge of feedback and distorted guitars that marked the blueprint for what Carlson at the time coined 'ambient metal'". Carlson was a close friend of Kurt Cobain, who sang lead vocals in the song "Divine and Bright", from a demo included on the re-release of the live album Sunn Amps and Smashed Guitars. Because police had twice confiscated guns from Cobain inside a single year, Cobain had Carlson purchase a shotgun for him on March 30, 1994. Cobain told Carlson the gun was for protection. Cobain would use the shotgun to kill himself six days later. The band went on hiatus after the release of Pentastar: In the Style of Demons due to Carlson's personal problems, including heroin addiction, rehabilitation, his connection to Kurt Cobain's death, and incarceration. Carlson attributed the break primarily to his heroin addiction:

At one point, music was everything to me. Then suddenly it wasn't and something else was there, and that was something destructive and damaging. Heroin is part of your life – you don't function without it. It's not like, "I need to get it to write," it's at a much more fundamental level to your existence, like, "I need it to get out of bed."

Earth reappeared around 2000 with a markedly different sound. Its music was still drone based, slow-paced, and lengthy, but it now included a drummer and featured strong elements of country music. Remarking on the stylistic change, Carlson was quick to point to the continuity with Earth's previous sound:

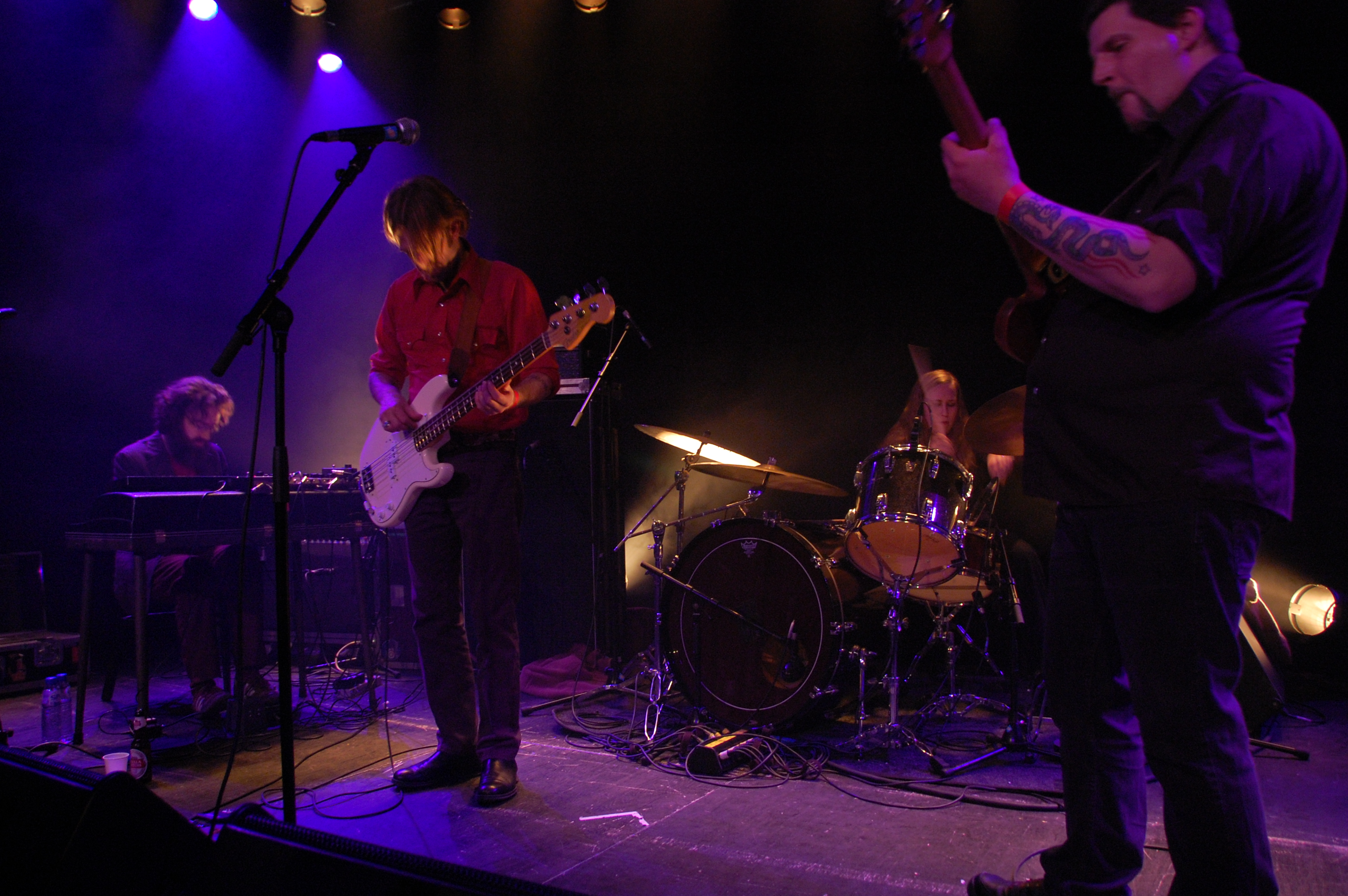
Earth performing live in Hamburg in 2009; from left to right: Steve Moore, Don McGreevy, Adrienne Davies and Dylan Carlson.

In 2001 I started writing again. Originally I had thought it would be something radically different and if it had been I probably wouldn't have stuck with the name. I thought about doing something different at first, but no matter what I do there's always going to be certain elements that are the same, like the slow tempos and repetition. So for whatever reason, I can't help myself - it was still Earth.

The press release for Hex; Or Printing in the Infernal Method (2005) stated the band's music shows "the influence of country guitarists/songwriters such as: Duane Eddy, Merle Haggard, Roy Buchanan and fuses it with the vibe of epic visionary composer: Ennio Morricone." The press release for The Bees Made Honey in the Lion's Skull (2008) referenced "the more adventurous San Francisco bands of the late 1960s and 1970s, and the more spiritually aware and exciting forms of Jazz-Rock from the same era". The press release for Angels of Darkness, Demons of Light I describes "inspiration from both British Folk-Rock bands the Pentangle and Fairport Convention".

On January 27, 2026, Earth’s scheduled concert at the TPO social centre in Bologna, Italy, was cancelled shortly before their performance. Earth objected to the presence of a Palestinian flag near the stage. The supporting act had already concluded their performance at the time of the cancellation. The late decision resulted in a reported financial loss of approximately €5,000 for TPO, which subsequently launched a crowdfunding campaign to cover the costs. Carlson said via social media that the venue had cancelled the performance rather than remove the flag, which he said “put politics above music”.

== Members ==
Current

- Dylan Carlson – guitar
- Adrienne Davies – drums

Touring

- Bill Herzog – bass guitar
- Brett Netson – guitar
- Jonas Haskins- guitar / bass guitar

Former / All

- Slim Moon – vocals
- Greg Babior – guitar
- Joe Preston – bass guitar, percussion
- Ian Dickson – guitar, bass guitar
- Dave Harwell – bass guitar
- John Schuller – bass
- Sean McElligot – guitar
- Michael McDaniel – drums
- Jonas Haskins – guitar, bass, baritone guitar
- Steve "Stebmo" Moore – electric piano, trombone, acoustic grand piano, Hammond organ, Wurlitzer electric piano
- Lori Goldston – cello
- Karl Blau – bass guitar
- Angelina Baldoz – bass guitar (tour only)
- Don McGreevy – bass guitar
- Brett Netson – guitar
- Bill Herzog – bass guitar

== Discography ==
Studio albums

- Earth 2: Special Low-Frequency Version (1993)
- Phase 3: Thrones and Dominions (1995)
- Pentastar: In the Style of Demons (1996)
- Hex; Or Printing in the Infernal Method (2005)
- Hibernaculum (2007)
- The Bees Made Honey in the Lion's Skull (2008)
- Angels of Darkness, Demons of Light I (2011)
- Angels of Darkness, Demons of Light II (2012)
- Primitive and Deadly (2014)
- Full upon Her Burning Lips (2019)

Collaborations

- The Bug & Earth: Concrete Desert (2017)

== See also ==
- List of ambient music artists
