= Dylan Carlson (musician) =

American guitarist (born 1968)

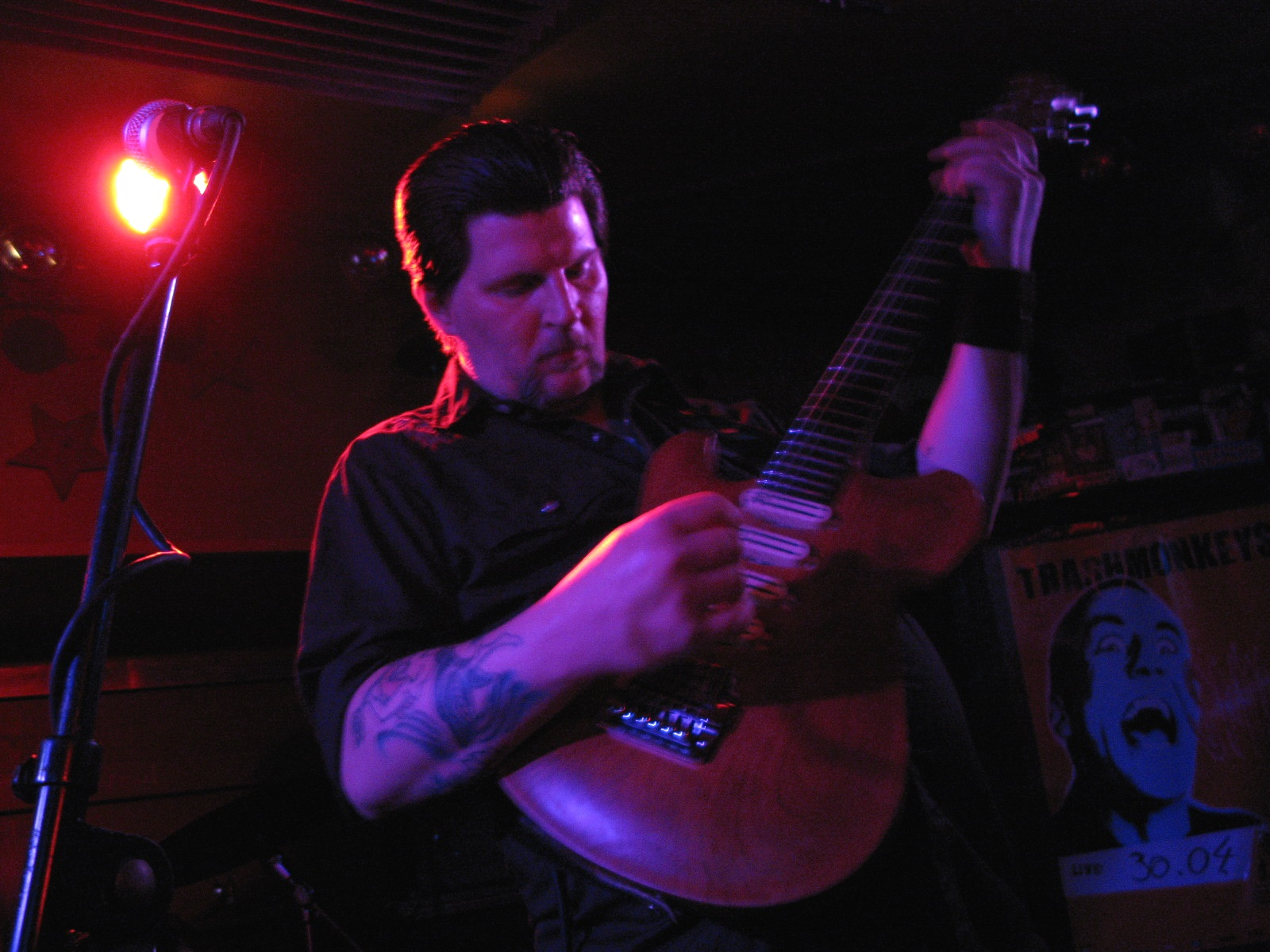
- Dylan Carlson in 2009

Background information
- Born: March 12, 1968 (age 58); Seattle, Washington, U.S.
- Genres: Drone doom; post-rock; experimental
- Instrument: Guitar
- Years active: 1985–present
- Website: www.thronesanddominions.com

Dylan Randolph Carlson (born March 12, 1968) is an American musician best known as the guitarist and founder of the drone metal/post-rock group Earth, and the main contributor to his solo project Drcarlsonalbion.

== Early life and education ==
Carlson was born in Seattle, Washington, United States. His father worked for the Department of Defense, and as a result, moved quite frequently. Carlson lived in Philadelphia, Texas, New Mexico, and New Jersey before coming back to live in Washington state.

== Career ==
Carlson first became interested in rock music at age 15, inspired by bands like Molly Hatchet, AC/DC, and Black Sabbath. He also cites the Melvins and composers La Monte Young and Terry Riley as major influences on his music. It was in Olympia, Washington that he met Slim Moon, Greg Babior, Dave Harwell and Joe Preston, with whom he would later form Earth. During this time, he would often work on various musical projects with his then-roommate Kurt Cobain. From 1991 to 1996, Earth had an ever-changing lineup. Carlson attributes a lack of full-length studio albums from 1997 to 2005 to "legal and drug problems."

== Personal life ==
Carlson was a good friend of Kurt Cobain of Nirvana and, like Cobain, has struggled with heroin addiction, particularly so after Cobain's death. Carlson purchased the gun that Cobain used to end his life, which he bought at Cobain's request six days before his death. He was with investigator Tom Grant when Grant searched Cobain's home, but they failed to search the greenhouse above the garage where his body was eventually discovered on April 8, 1994.

In his biography of Cobain, Heavier Than Heaven, Charles R. Cross asserted that "In Bloom" was a "thinly disguised portrait" of Carlson. He now lives in recovery of heroin addiction. He has survived a rare form of hepatitis B and liver failure. Carlson was married to fellow Earth member, drummer Adrienne Davies for a time. Davies remains in the band despite their split.

== Solo discography ==
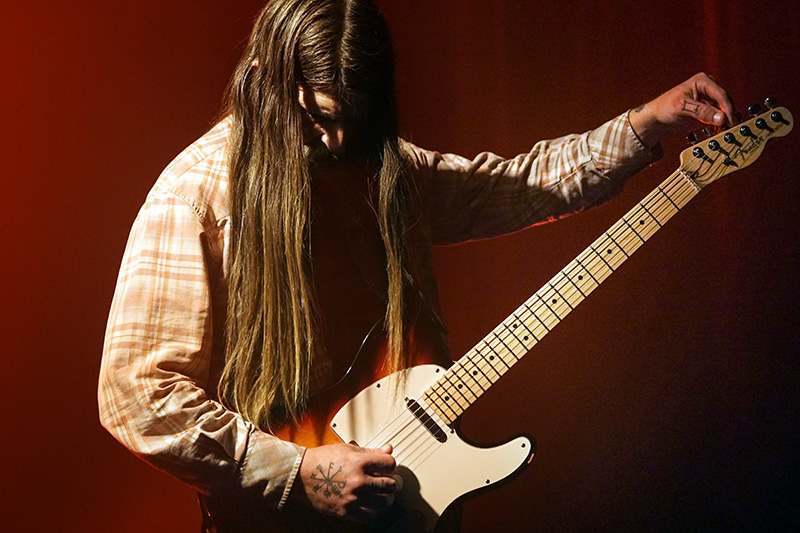
Dylan Carlson at Aarhus Festival, Denmark 2018

- La Strega and the Cunning Man in the Smoke (as Drcarlsonalbion) (2012)
- Gold (as Drcarlsonalbion) (2014)
- Falling with a 1000 Stars and other wonders from the House of Albion (with Coleman Grey) (2016)
- Conquistador (2018)
