= 2025 in American music =

The following is a list of events and releases that happened in 2025 in music in the United States.

== Notable events ==
=== January ===
- 10 – Tremonti released their first studio album in four years, The End Will Show Us How.
- 17 – Balloonerism, the second posthumous Mac Miller album in five years, was released.
- 20 – Coco Jones performed the national anthem and Travis Scott performed the halftime show at the College Football Playoff National Championship at Mercedes-Benz Stadium in Atlanta, Georgia.
- 25 – Bowling for Soup co-founder and lead guitarist Chris Burney announced his retirement from the band after playing with them for over 30 years.
- 28 – Singer Chase Lawrence announced the breakup of his band, Coin, following allegations of misconduct against drummer Ryan Winnen and guitarist Joe Memmel.
- 31 – All That Remains released their first studio album in almost seven years, Antifragile. It is also the band's first album to not feature original guitarist Oli Herbert following Herbert's death in 2018.
  - Grayscale released their first studio album in four years, The Hart.
  - Moe released their first studio album in five years, Circle of Giants.
  - Pentagram released their first studio album in ten years, Lightning in a Bottle.

=== February ===
- 2 – The 67th Annual Grammy Awards took place at the Crypto.com Arena in Los Angeles. Beyoncé won Album of the Year for Cowboy Carter, Kendrick Lamar won Record of the Year and Song of the Year for "Not Like Us" and Chappell Roan won Best New Artist.
- 5 – Record producer and Murder Inc. Records co-founder Irv Gotti died from a stroke at the age of 54.
- 7 – Dream Theater released their first studio album in nearly four years, Parasomnia. It is also the band's first album with original drummer Mike Portnoy since 2009.
  - Tyga released his first studio album in nearly six years, NSFW.
- 9 – Jon Batiste performed the national anthem and Kendrick Lamar and SZA performed the halftime show during Super Bowl LIX at the Caesars Superdome in New Orleans, Louisiana.
- 14 – Amber Pacific released their first studio album in nearly eleven years, All In.
- 18 – A Day to Remember released their first studio album in nearly four years, Big Ole Album Vol. 1. It is also the band's first album to not feature founding bassist Joshua Woodard following Woodard's departure in 2021.
- 21 – Killswitch Engage released their first studio album in six years, This Consequence.
  - Nardo Wick released his first studio album in nearly four years, Wick.
  - Mike Posner released his first solo album in nearly five years, The Beginning.
- 24 – Legendary R&B singer Roberta Flack died from cardiac arrest stemming from complications of ALS at the age of 88.
- 28 – New York Dolls lead singer David Johansen, the band's last surviving original member, died from cancer at the age of 75.
  - Shinedown bassist Eric Bass released his debut solo album, I Had a Name.

=== March ===
- 1 – R&B and soul singer Angie Stone died in a car crash in Montgomery, Alabama at the age of 63.
- 7 – Bob Mould released his first studio album in five years, Here We Go Crazy.
  - Lady Gaga released her first solo album in nearly five years, Mayhem.
  - Whitechapel released their first studio album in four years, Hymns in Dissonance.
  - Mastodon co-founder and lead guitarist Brent Hinds announced his departure from the band after 25 years. He was later killed in a traffic collision on August 20.
- 14 – Clipping released their first studio album in five years, Dead Channel Sky.
  - Warbringer released their first studio album in five years, Wrath and Ruin.
  - Playboi Carti released his first studio album in nearly five years, Music.
- 17 – The 2025 iHeartRadio Music Awards took place at the Dolby Theatre in Los Angeles.
- 21 – Japanese Breakfast released their first studio album in almost four years, For Melancholy Brunettes (and Sad Women).
  - Selena Gomez and Benny Blanco released their collaborative studio album, I Said I Love You First. It is Gomez's first album in five years and Blanco's first in seven years.
  - My Morning Jacket released their first studio album in four years, Is.
- 28 – Will Smith released his first studio album in twenty years, Based on a True Story.
  - Lucy Dacus released her first solo album in nearly four years, Forever Is a Feeling.
  - Deafheaven released their first studio album in four years, Lonely People with Power.
  - Alison Krauss & Union Station released their first studio album in fourteen years, Arcadia. It is Krauss' first album in four years.

=== April ===
- 2 – Duckwrth released his first studio album in five years, All American FuckBoy.
- 4 – Grace VanderWaal released her first studio album in nearly eight years, Childstar.
- 6 – Blondie drummer Clem Burke died from cancer at the age of 70.
- 11 – Spin Doctors released their first studio album in twelve years, Face Full of Cake.
  - OK Go released their first studio album in nearly eleven years, And the Adjacent Possible.
  - Bon Iver released their first studio album in six years, Sable, Fable.
  - Sleigh Bells released their first studio album in four years, Bunky Becky Birthday Boy.
  - Bootsy Collins released his first studio album in five years, Album of the Year #1 Funkateer.
- 12 – Wu-Tang Clan and Mathematics released their collaborative studio album, Black Samson, the Bastard Swordsman. It is the Wu-Tang Clan's first studio album in ten years, their first to be publicly available in eleven years and their first group project in seven years.
- 18 – Tunde Adebimpe released his debut solo album, Thee Black Boltz, which is also his first album in nearly eleven years following the release of Seeds by his band, TV on the Radio, in November 2014.
  - Keri Hilson released her first studio album in fifteen years, We Need to Talk: Love. It is the first installment of a planned three-part album. The second part, We Need to Talk: Drama, was released in September.
  - Superheaven released their self-titled album, their first in ten years.

=== May ===
- 1 – Singer Jill Sobule died in a house fire in Woodbury, Minnesota at the age of 66.
- 2 – Car Seat Headrest released their first studio album in five years, The Scholars.
  - Eric Church released his first studio album in four years, Evangeline vs. the Machine.
  - Maddie & Tae released their first studio album in five years, Love & Light.
  - Suzanne Vega released her first studio album in nine years, Flying with Angels.
- 7 – 3 Doors Down frontman Brad Arnold announced that he was diagnosed with Stage IV clear cell renal carcinoma, which had metastasized to his lung. With his diagnosis, 3 Doors Down cancelled their 2025 shows including their summer tour.
- 8 – The 60th Academy of Country Music Awards took place at the Ford Center at The Star in Frisco, Texas.
- 9 – Counting Crows released their first studio album in eleven years, Butter Miracle, The Complete Sweets!.
  - Blake Shelton released his first studio album in four years, For Recreational Use Only.
  - Tetrarch released their first studio album in four years, The Ugly Side of Me.
- 16 – Xzibit released his first studio album in thirteen years, Kingmaker.
  - Tune-Yards released their first studio album in four years, Better Dreaming.
  - Pelican released their first studio album in six years, Flickering Resonance.
  - Foo Fighters part ways with their drummer of two years, Josh Freese, with no explanation. Freese had been hired as the replacement for longtime drummer Taylor Hawkins, who died in 2022.
- 18 – Jamal Roberts won the twenty-third season of American Idol. John Foster was named runner-up and Breanna Nix placed third.
- 20 – Adam David won the twenty-seventh season of The Voice. Jaelen Johnston was named runner-up. Renzo, Lucia Flores-Wiseman, and Jadyn Cree finished in third, fourth, and fifth place respectively.
- 23 – Billy Joel cancelled his upcoming concert tours after being diagnosed with normal pressure hydrocephalus which leads to problems with his hearing, vision and balance.
  - Joe Jonas released his first solo album in nearly fourteen years, Music for People Who Believe in Love.
  - Hinder released their first studio album in eight years, Back to Life.
- 26 – The American Music Awards took place at the Fontainebleau Las Vegas in Winchester, Nevada.
- 30 – Taylor Swift bought back the masters of her first six albums from Shamrock Holdings.
  - Ben Kweller released his first studio album in four years, Cover the Mirrors.
  - Garbage released their first studio album in four years, Let All That We Imagine Be the Light.
  - The National vocalist Matt Berninger released his first solo album in five years, Get Sunk.
  - Anderson East released his first studio album in four years, Worthy.

=== June ===
- 6 – Black Moth Super Rainbow released their first studio album in seven years, Soft New Magic Dream.
  - The Doobie Brothers released their first studio album in four years, Walk This Road.
  - Lil Wayne released his first solo album in five years, Tha Carter VI.
  - Rascal Flatts released their first studio album in eight years, Life Is a Highway: Refueled Duets.
  - Turnstile released their first studio album in four years, Never Enough. It is also their first album with guitarist Meg Mills, who replaced guitarist and co-founder Brady Ebert after his departure from the band in 2022.
- 9 – Sly and the Family Stone frontman Sly Stone died at the age of 82.
- 11 – The Beach Boys co-founder and singer Brian Wilson died at the age of 82.
- 13 – Slick Rick released his first studio album in twenty-six years, Victory.
- 20 – Haim released their first studio album in five years, I Quit.
  - Memphis Bleek released his first studio album in twenty years, Apt 3D.
  - Badflower released their first studio album in four years, No Place Like Home.
  - James McMurtry released his first studio album in four years, The Black Dog and the Wandering Boy.
- 25 – Charles Kelley released his first solo album in nine years, Songs for a New Moon.
- 27 – Public Enemy released their first studio album in five years, Black Sky Over the Projects: Apartment 2025.
  - Fishbone released their first studio album in nineteen years, Stockholm Syndrome.
  - Deadguy released their first studio album in thirty years, Near-Death Travel Services.

=== July ===
- 2 – Sean Combs was found guilty on two counts of transportation for the purpose of prostitution. He was found not guilty of racketeering conspiracy and sex trafficking.
- 7 – After being in the band for 27 years, drummer Matt Cameron announced his departure from Pearl Jam.
- 11 – Clipse released their first studio album in fifteen years, Let God Sort Em Out.
  - Born of Osiris released their first studio album in four years, Through Shadows.
  - Hell released their first studio album in eight years, Submersus.
- 16 – Connie Francis, the first female artist to score a number 1 hit on the Billboard Hot 100 chart, died at the age of 87.
- 18 – Raekwon released his first studio album in eight years, The Emperor's New Clothes.
  - Cam released her first studio album in nearly five years, All Things Light.
  - Lord Huron released their first studio album in four years, The Cosmic Selector Vol. 1.
  - Styx released their first studio album in four years, Circling from Above.
  - Trisha Yearwood released her first studio album in six years, The Mirror.
- 22 – Jazz trumpeter Chuck Mangione died in his sleep at the age of 84.
- 25 – Alice Cooper released their reunion album, The Revenge of Alice Cooper. It is the first studio album released by the full band in fifty-two years, though its eponymous lead vocalist has been prolific with solo material in the interim period, and is dedicated to former lead guitarist Glen Buxton, who died from viral pneumonia in 1997.

=== August ===
- 1–3 – The 34th and final Oregon Jamboree country music festival was held in Sweet Home, Oregon.
- 6 – Latin jazz and salsa musician Eddie Palmieri died at the age of 88.
- 8 – Good Charlotte released their first studio album in seven years, Motel Du Cap.
  - Ashley Monroe released her first studio album in four years, Tennessee Lightning.
  - Attack Attack! released their first studio album in thirteen years, Attack Attack! II.
- 12 – Insane Clown Posse released their first studio album in four years, The Naught.
- 15 – Rise Against released their first studio album in four years, Ricochet.
  - Chance the Rapper released his first studio album in six years, Star Line.
  - Maroon 5 released their first studio album in four years, Love Is Like.
  - Chevelle released their first studio album in four years, Bright as Blasphemy.
  - Marissa Nadler released her first studio album in four years, New Radiations.
- 22 – Deftones released their first studio album in nearly five years, Private Music.
  - Ciara released her first studio album in six years, CiCi.
  - Hunx and His Punx released their first studio album in twelve years, Walk Out on This World.
  - Teyana Taylor released her first studio album in five years, Escape Room.
  - The World Is a Beautiful Place & I Am No Longer Afraid to Die released their first studio album in four years, Dreams of Being Dust.
- 25 – The Summer Set released their first studio album in four years, Meet Me at the Record Store.
- 28 – Hayley Williams of Paramore released her first solo album in four years, Ego Death at a Bachelorette Party. The following week, on September 5, she announced that Paramore would be taking a break.
- 29 – Vicious Rumors released their first studio album in five years, The Devil's Asylum.

=== September ===
- 5 – Dark Angel released their first studio album in thirty-four years, Extinction Level Event.
  - David Byrne released his first studio album in seven years, Who Is the Sky?.
  - Rob Thomas released his first solo album in four years and his first of all-original material in six years, All Night Days.
  - La Dispute released their first studio album in six years, No One Was Driving the Car.
  - Blessthefall released their first studio album in seven years, Gallows.
  - Ivy released their first studio album in fourteen years, Traces of You. The album was dedicated to founding member Adam Schlesinger, who died in 2020 due to complications from COVID-19.
  - Modern Life Is War released their first studio album in twelve years, Life on the Moon.
- 7 – The MTV Video Music Awards took place at the UBS Arena in Elmont, New York.
- 12 – Between the Buried and Me released their first studio album in four years, The Blue Nowhere.
  - Cafuné released their sophomore studio album, and also their first in four years, Bite Reality.
  - John Carter Cash released his first studio album in seven years, Pineapple John.
  - Starset released their first studio album in four years, Silos.
  - Teenage Bottlerocket released their first studio album in four years, Ready to Roll.
- 18 – Longtime music video director and choreographer Diane Martel died from breast cancer at the age of 63.
- 19 – Cardi B released her first studio album in seven years, Am I the Drama?.
  - 38 Special released their first studio album in twenty-one years, Milestone.
  - Motion City Soundtrack released their first studio album in ten years, The Same Old Wasted Wonderful World.
- 26 – Mariah Carey released her first studio album in nearly seven years, Here for It All.
  - Neko Case released her first solo studio album in seven years, Neon Grey Midnight Green.
  - Lady A released their first studio album in four years, On This Winter's Night: Volume 2.
  - The Starting Line released their first studio album in eighteen years, Eternal Youth.

=== October ===
- 3 – AFI released their first studio album in four years, Silver Bleeds the Black Sun....
  - Thrice released their first studio album in four years, Horizons/West.
  - The Red Jumpsuit Apparatus released their first studio album in seven years, X's for Eyes.
- 10 – Mobb Deep released their first studio album in eleven years, Infinite. It is their only album following Prodigy's death in 2017.
  - Yellowcard released their first studio album in nine years, Better Days.
  - Testament released their first studio album in five years, Para Bellum.
  - John 5 released his first studio album in four years, Ghost.
  - Jay Som released her first studio album in six years, Belong.
  - Bernie Leadon released his first solo studio album in twenty-one years, Too Late to Be Cool.
  - Black Eyes released their first studio album in twenty-one years, Hostile Design.
- 14 – Neo soul singer D'Angelo died from pancreatic cancer at the age of 51.
- 16 – Kiss co-founder and original lead guitarist Ace Frehley died at the age of 74 following complications from a fall he suffered in his studio.
- 17 – Biohazard released their first studio album in thirteen years, Divided We Fall.
  - Tombs released their first studio album in five years, Feral Darkness.
  - Ty Dolla Sign released his first solo album in five years, Tycoon.
- 18 – Limp Bizkit bassist Sam Rivers died at the age of 48.
- 23 – Miguel released his first studio album in eight years, Caos.
- 24 – The Lemonheads released their first studio album in six years, and also their first album of original material in nineteen years, Love Chant.
  - Brandi Carlile released her first solo studio album in four years, Returning to Myself.
  - Tortoise released their first studio album in nine years, Touch.
- 31 – Armani White released his first studio album in six years, There's a Ghost in My House.
  - Lydia Luce released her first studio album in four years, Mammoth.
  - Saintseneca released their first studio album in seven years, Highwallow & Supermoon Songs.

=== November ===
- 7 – Mavis Staples released her first studio album in six years, Sad and Beautiful World.
  - Agnostic Front released their first studio album in six years, Echoes in Eternity.
  - Jessica Fortino, under her project Tiny Vipers, released her first studio album in eight years, Tormentor.
- 14 – Summer Walker released her first studio album in four years, Finally Over It.
  - Cheap Trick released their first studio album in four years, All Washed Up.
  - Wale released his first studio album in four years, Everything Is a Lot.
  - The Neighbourhood released their first studio album in five years, Ultrasound.
- 21 – De La Soul released their first studio album in nine years, Cabin in the Sky. It is the group's first album since founding member Trugoy the Dove's death in 2023, though it featured his contributions from prior recordings.
  - Spock's Beard released their first studio album in seven years, The Archaeoptimist.

=== December ===
- 5 – Zac Brown Band released their first studio album in four years, Love & Fear.
  - Seeming released their first studio album in five years, The World.
- 8 – The Mavericks frontman Raul Malo died from colon cancer at the age of 60.
- 12 – Jim Peterik and his band World Stage released an album of duets, River of Music – The Power of Duets, Vol. 1.
- 17 – One year and three months after the onstage altercation between Perry Farrell and Dave Navarro in Boston, the members of Jane's Addiction officially announced the band's breakup despite their reconciliation.
- 19 – Peter Criss released his self-titled album, his first in eighteen years.

== Bands reformed ==
- The Click Five
- Fifth Harmony
- Fountains of Wayne
- Girlset
- Myka Relocate
- The Neighbourhood
- Rilo Kiley
- Spineshank
- The Thermals

== Bands on hiatus ==
- Paramore
- Tennis

== Bands disbanded ==
- Coin
- Jane's Addiction
- Jawbox
- REO Speedwagon
- Stray from the Path

== List of albums released ==
=== January ===
Date	Album	Artist	Genre(s)
3	WHAM	Lil Baby	Hip-hop
8	Perverts	Ethel Cain	Alternative rock; indie rock; ambient
10	The End Will Show Us How	Tremonti	Alternative metal; rock
16	Dyed (2008-2023)	The Maine	Indie rock; alternative rock
17	Mend	Eidola	Rock
17	Balloonerism	Mac Miller	Hip-hop
24	The High Road	Kane Brown	Country; R&B
24	Burnout Days	Flipturn	Indie rock; alternative rock
24	NGL (EP)	JoJo	Pop; R&B
24	I've Tried Everything but Therapy (Part 2)	Teddy Swims	Pop; R&B
31	Antifragile	All That Remains	Metalcore; heavy metal
31	The Hart	Grayscale	Pop-punk; alternative rock
31	Violet	L.S. Dunes	Post-hardcore; alternative rock; emo
31	Circle of Giants	Moe	Progressive rock; rock
31	Lightning in a Bottle	Pentagram	Doom metal

=== February ===
Date	Album	Artist	Genre(s)
7	Parasomnia	Dream Theater	Progressive metal
7	Universe Room	Guided by Voices	Indie rock
7	year of the slug	Caroline Rose	Indie pop; indie rock
7	NSFW	Tyga	Hip-hop
7	Sharon Van Etten & the Attachment Theory	Sharon Van Etten	Rock
14	New Dawn	Marshall Allen	Jazz
14	All In	Amber Pacific	Pop-punk; emo
14	Satisfied Soul (EP)	Brother Ali and Ant	Hip-hop
14	Phonetics On and On	Horsegirl	Post-punk; indie rock
14	Automatic	The Lumineers	Indie folk; indie pop
14	Saint Motel & the Symphony in the Sky	Saint Motel	Indie pop
14	Welcome to Your Funeral	Twiztid	Horrorcore; hip-hop; rap rock
14	Ghostholding	Venturing	Indie rock; emo
14	Plus One	The War and Treaty	Americana; Southern soul
18	Big Ole Album Vol. 1	A Day to Remember	Metalcore; pop-punk
21	This Consequence	Killswitch Engage	Metalcore; heavy metal
21	The Beginning	Mike Posner	Pop
21	Wick	Nardo Wick	Hip-hop
28	The Music of Tori and the Muses	Tori Amos	Pop
28	Off with Her Head	Banks	Pop; pop rock
28	I Had a Name	Eric Bass	Rock
28	Billboard Heart	Deep Sea Diver	Indie rock; indie pop
28	Softcore	Transviolet	Indie pop

=== March ===
Date	Album	Artist	Genre(s)
7	Foxes in the Snow	Jason Isbell	Americana; folk; country rock
7	Mayhem	Lady Gaga	Synth-pop; dance-pop; industrial
7	Here We Go Crazy	Bob Mould	Alternative rock; rock
7	Hymns in Dissonance	Whitechapel	Deathcore; progressive metal
14	Dead Channel Sky	Clipping	Alternative hip-hop
14	Vaxis – Act III: The Father of Make Believe	Coheed and Cambria	Progressive rock; alternative rock
14	Quitter	Giovannie and the Hired Guns	Rock; country rock; alternative rock
14	Music	Playboi Carti	Hip-hop
14	Wrath and Ruin	Warbringer	Thrash metal
21	I Said I Love You First	Selena Gomez and Benny Blanco	Pop
21	For Melancholy Brunettes (and Sad Women)	Japanese Breakfast	Indie pop; indie rock
21	Is	My Morning Jacket	Indie rock; alternative rock
28	Forever Is a Feeling	Lucy Dacus	Indie rock; indie folk
28	Lonely People with Power	Deafheaven	Black metal; heavy metal
28	Arcadia	Alison Krauss & Union Station	Bluegrass; country
28	Deep Thoughts	Lil Durk	Hip-hop
28	Shapeshifter	Memphis May Fire	Metalcore; alternative metal
28	Glory	Perfume Genius	Art pop; indie pop; indie rock
28	Based on a True Story	Will Smith	Hip-hop
28	Good Company	The Walters	Indie pop; indie rock

=== April ===
Date	Album	Artist	Genre(s)
2	All American FuckBoy	Duckwrth	Alternative hip-hop
4	The Crux	Djo	Synth-pop; indie pop; neo-psychedelia
4	Welcome to My Blue Sky	Momma	Indie rock; indie pop
4	Revengeseekerz	Jane Remover	Hyperpop; alt-pop
4	Are We All Angels	Scowl	Punk rock; pop-punk; alternative rock
4	Childstar	Grace VanderWaal	Pop
11	Sable, Fable	Bon Iver	Indie folk; indie rock
11	More Chaos	Ken Carson	Hip-hop
11	Album of the Year #1 Funkateer	Bootsy Collins	Funk; soul; R&B
11	And the Adjacent Possible	OK Go	Alternative rock; pop rock
11	Bunky Becky Birthday Boy	Sleigh Bells	Indie pop; alternative rock
11	Face Full of Cake	Spin Doctors	Alternative rock; rock
12	Black Samson, the Bastard Swordsman	Wu-Tang Clan and Mathematics	Hip-hop
18	Thee Black Boltz	Tunde Adebimpe	Indie rock; alternative rock
18	We Need to Talk: Love	Keri Hilson	R&B
18	Sweet (EP)	Mayday Parade	Pop-punk; emo
18	Superheaven	Superheaven	Alternative rock
25	Joyride the Pale Horse	Heart Attack Man	Punk rock; emo; pop-punk
25	Why Not More?	Coco Jones	R&B
25	Oh What a Beautiful World	Willie Nelson	Country
25	At the Beach, in Every Life	Gigi Perez	Indie pop; indie rock; alternative rock
25	Mortal Primetime	Sunflower Bean	Indie pop; indie rock
25	Face Down in the Garden	Tennis	Indie pop; alternative rock
25	What Not To	Tucker Wetmore	Country

=== May ===
Date	Album	Artist	Genre(s)
2	Excelsior	Benny the Butcher	Hip-hop
2	The Scholars	Car Seat Headrest	Indie rock
2	Evangeline vs. the Machine	Eric Church	Country
2	Blame The Chat	DDG	Hip-hop
2	Glockaveli	Key Glock	Hip-hop
2	Gems	Josh Groban	Pop
2	Country! (EP)	Hardy	Country
2	Lucius	Lucius	Indie pop; indie rock
2	Love & Light	Maddie & Tae	Country
2	Kiss the Machine	Puddle of Mudd	Hard rock; rock; post-grunge
2	Flying with Angels	Suzanne Vega	Alternative rock; folk rock
9	Butter Miracle, The Complete Sweets!	Counting Crows	Alternative rock; rock
9	Child of God II	Forrest Frank	Christian pop; hip-hop; lo-fi
9	Aperture	The Head and the Heart	Indie folk; indie rock
9	Dreamsicle	Maren Morris	Pop; country
9	For Recreational Use Only	Blake Shelton	Country
9	The Ugly Side of Me	Tetrarch	Nu metal; heavy metal
9	Sincerely	Kali Uchis	R&B; pop
16	Goodbye Small Head	Ezra Furman	Alternative pop; indie pop; indie folk
16	Flickering Resonance	Pelican	Post-metal
16	Afterglow	Sleep Theory	Alternative metal; hard rock; nu metal
16	Butter	Sofi Tukker	House; samba
16	Sons of Sunday	Sons of Sunday	Worship; Christian; gospel
16	Better Dreaming	Tune-Yards	Art pop; indie pop
16	I'm the Problem	Morgan Wallen	Country; country pop; country rock
16	Kingmaker	Xzibit	Hip-hop
23	Back to Life	Hinder	Hard rock; alternative rock
23	Hunting Season	Home Is Where	Emo; post-hardcore
23	Music for People Who Believe in Love	Joe Jonas	Pop
23	Map of a Blue City	Marc Ribot	Alternative rock; folk rock
23	Mad!	Sparks	Rock; pop
23	Pressure	Julia Wolf	Indie pop; indie rock; alternative rock
30	Get Sunk	Matt Berninger	Alternative rock; indie rock
30	Something Beautiful	Miley Cyrus	Pop
30	Worthy	Anderson East	Americana; roots rock
30	Let All That We Imagine Be the Light	Garbage	Alternative rock; rock
30	Cover the Mirrors	Ben Kweller	Indie rock; alternative rock
30	Hope We Have Fun	Mt. Joy	Alternative rock; indie rock; indie pop
30	Clockworked	Stray from the Path	Metalcore; hardcore punk

=== June ===
Date	Album	Artist	Genre(s)
6	Soft New Magic Dream	Black Moth Super Rainbow	Psychedelic pop; indie rock
6	Walk This Road	The Doobie Brothers	Rock
6	Tha Carter VI	Lil Wayne	Hip-hop
6	Addison	Addison Rae	Pop; synth-pop; dance-pop
6	Life Is a Highway: Refueled Duets	Rascal Flatts	Country
6	If Nevermore	Sub Urban	Indie pop
6	Never Enough	Turnstile	Hardcore punk; alternative rock
13	Broken Branches	Dierks Bentley	Country
13	Roar Like Thunder	Buckcherry	Hard rock; alternative rock
13	Harbingers	Byzantine	Hard rock; heavy metal
13	What's Not To Love	John C. Reilly	Alternative country; folk
13	Victory	Slick Rick	Hip-hop
20	No Place Like Home	Badflower	Hard rock; alternative rock
20	American Heart	Benson Boone	Pop rock
20	I Quit	Haim	Alternative rock; pop rock
20	The Black Dog and the Wandering Boy	James McMurtry	Roots rock; folk rock; alternative country
20	Apt 3D	Memphis Bleek	Hip-hop
20	2.0	Brett Young	Country
25	Songs for a New Moon	Charles Kelley	Country; rock
27	Winged Victory	Willi Carlisle	Folk; country
27	Near-Death Travel Services	Deadguy	Metalcore; heavy metal
27	Stockholm Syndrome	Fishbone	Funk metal; alternative rock
27	Somewhere	Charlotte Lawrence	Dance; electropop
27	Parker McCollum	Parker McCollum	Country
27	Black Sky Over the Projects: Apartment 2025	Public Enemy	Hip-hop
27	Spanish Moss	Cole Swindell	Country

=== July ===
Date	Album	Artist	Genre(s)
4	For the People	Dropkick Murphys	Celtic punk
4	GDLU (Preluxe)	JID	Hip-hop
4	Period	Kesha	Dance-pop; hyperpop
4	Only Frozen Sky Anyway	Jonathan Richman	Folk; rock
11	Through Shadows	Born of Osiris	Progressive metal; metalcore
11	Let God Sort Em Out	Clipse	Hip-hop
11	Ain't Rocked in a While	Brent Cobb & The Fixin's	Country; rock
11	Beloved	Giveon	R&B
11	Submersus	Hell	Doom metal
18	All Things Light	Cam	Country; pop
18	The Cosmic Selector Vol. 1	Lord Huron	Indie rock; alternative rock
18	The Emperor's New Clothes	Raekwon	Hip-hop
18	Circling from Above	Styx	Hard rock; progressive rock
18	You'll Be Alright, Kid	Alex Warren	Folk-pop
18	Qualifying Miles	We Are Scientists	Indie rock
18	The Mirror	Trisha Yearwood	Country
21	Don't Tap the Glass	Tyler, the Creator	Hip-hop; dance; funk
25	The Revenge of Alice Cooper	Alice Cooper	Hard rock; rock
25	The Way It Never Was	Atomic Tom	Alternative rock; indie rock
25	Snipe Hunter	Tyler Childers	Country
25	Precipice	Indigo De Souza	Indie rock; alternative rock
25	Man on the Moon	Fitz and the Tantrums	Indie pop; alternative rock
25	Crown of Roses	Patty Griffin	Folk; country

=== August ===
Date	Album	Artist	Genre(s)
1	Lonely God	Fit for a King	Metalcore; heavy metal
1	Wild Horses	Chris Janson	Country
1	Bite Me	Reneé Rapp	Pop; R&B
1	Thy Kingdom Come	Suicideboys	Hip-hop
1	If Not Winter	Wisp	Indie rock; alternative rock
8	Attack Attack! II	Attack Attack!	Metalcore; hard rock
8	Accelerator	Bad Suns	Alternative rock; dream pop
8	No Rain, No Flowers	The Black Keys	Alternative rock; garage rock
8	Willoughby Tucker, I'll Always Love You	Ethel Cain	Americana; folk; indie pop
8	Motel Du Cap	Good Charlotte	Pop-punk; alternative rock
8	God Does Like Ugly	JID	Hip-hop
8	Greetings from Your Hometown	Jonas Brothers	Pop
8	Tennessee Lightning	Ashley Monroe	Country
8	Different Night Same Rodeo	Bailey Zimmerman	Country
12	The Naught	Insane Clown Posse	Horrorcore; hip-hop; rap rock
15	Star Line	Chance the Rapper	Hip-hop
15	Bright as Blasphemy	Chevelle	Hard rock; alternative metal
15	Learn the Hard Way	Jordan Davis	Country
15	Live at the Warfield	Jerry Garcia Band	Rock
15	Love Is Like	Maroon 5	Pop rock
15	New Radiations	Marissa Nadler	Indie folk; indie rock
15	Ricochet	Rise Against	Punk rock; melodic hardcore
22	CiCi	Ciara	R&B
22	Private Music	Deftones	Alternative metal; hard rock
22	The Sound a Body Makes When It's Still	Hot Mulligan	Pop-punk; emo; alternative rock
22	Walk Out on This World	Hunx and His Punx	Punk rock; alternative rock
22	Hearts Sold Separately	Mariah the Scientist	R&B
22	Don't Click Play	Ava Max	Pop
22	I Barely Know Her	Sombr	Indie rock; alternative pop
22	Escape Room	Teyana Taylor	R&B
22	Dreams of Being Dust	The World Is a Beautiful Place & I Am No Longer Afraid to Die	Emo; indie rock; post-hardcore
25	Meet Me at the Record Store	The Summer Set	Indie pop; pop-punk; indie rock
28	Ego Death at a Bachelorette Party	Hayley Williams	Pop rock; alternative rock
29	Once Upon a Time in California	Belinda Carlisle	Rock; pop
29	Man's Best Friend	Sabrina Carpenter	Pop
29	Hard Headed Woman	Margo Price	Country; pop
29	Caught Stealing (The Original Motion Picture Soundtrack)	Rob Simonsen and Idles	Film score; post-punk
29	Ain't in It for My Health	Zach Top	Country
29	The Devil's Asylum	Vicious Rumors	Power metal

=== September ===
Date	Album	Artist	Genre (s)
5	What No One's Thinking (EP)	AJR	Indie pop; electropop
5	Gallows	Blessthefall	Metalcore; hard rock
5	Who Is the Sky?	David Byrne	Alternative rock; rock
5	Extinction Level Event	Dark Angel	Thrash metal
5	Traces of You	Ivy	Indie pop; indie rock
5	No One Was Driving the Car	La Dispute	Post-hardcore; progressive rock
5	Life on the Moon	Modern Life Is War	Hardcore punk
5	All Night Days	Rob Thomas	Pop rock; alternative rock
12	The Blue Nowhere	Between the Buried and Me	Progressive metal; metalcore
12	Bite Reality	Cafuné	Electropop; dance-pop; indie pop
12	Pineapple John	John Carter Cash	Country; folk
12	Pantheon	Dance Gavin Dance	Post-hardcore
12	We Need to Talk: Drama	Keri Hilson	R&B
12	A Quiet and Harmless Living	Matt Maeson	Alternative rock; indie rock; rock
12	Silos	Starset	Rock; hard rock; electronic rock
12	Ready to Roll	Teenage Bottlerocket	Punk rock; pop-punk
12	Breach	Twenty One Pilots	Alternative rock; pop rock; alternative hip-hop
19	Milestone	38 Special	Hard rock; Southern rock
19	Jestures	Atmosphere	Hip-hop
19	Season of the Peach	Black Lips	Punk rock; garage rock; rock
19	Am I the Drama?	Cardi B	Hip-hop
19	Violent Nature	I Prevail	Metalcore; alternative metal; post-hardcore
19	The Same Old Wasted Wonderful World	Motion City Soundtrack	Alternative rock; pop-punk
19	Dance Called Memory	Nation of Language	Indie pop
19	Bleeds	Wednesday	Alternative rock; country rock
26	Here for It All	Mariah Carey	R&B; pop
26	Neon Grey Midnight Green	Neko Case	Indie rock; alternative country
26	Vie	Doja Cat	Pop; hip-hop; R&B
26	Country! Country!	Hardy	Country; country rock
26	On This Winter's Night: Volume 2	Lady A	Christmas; country
26	Fight Song (Rachel's Version)	Rachel Platten	Pop
26	Bones	Rainbow Kitten Surprise	Alternative rock; indie rock; indie pop
26	Eternal Youth	The Starting Line	Alternative rock; pop-punk
26	Only Slightly Empty	White Reaper	Garage rock; punk rock

=== October ===
Date	Album	Artist	Genre(s)
3	Silver Bleeds the Black Sun...	AFI	Gothic rock; post-hardcore
3	Kiss of the Spider Woman (Original Motion Picture Soundtrack)	Jennifer Lopez, Diego Luna and Tonatiuh	Pop
3	Sad (EP)	Mayday Parade	Pop rock; pop-punk; emo
3	X's for Eyes	The Red Jumpsuit Apparatus	Post-hardcore; emo; pop-punk; alternative rock; alternative metal
3	Cut & Rewind	Say She She	Indie pop; alternative rock
3	Lunger	Stay Inside	Post-punk; post-hardcore
3	The Life of a Showgirl	Taylor Swift	Pop
3	Horizons/West	Thrice	Post-hardcore; alternative rock
10	Here and Nowhere	The Autumn Defense	Alternative country; baroque pop
10	Hostile Design	Black Eyes	Post-punk; post-hardcore
10	Ghost	John 5	Hard rock; alternative metal
10	Too Late to Be Cool	Bernie Leadon	Rock; country
10	Infinite	Mobb Deep	Hip-hop
10	Belong	Jay Som	Indie pop; indie rock
10	Para Bellum	Testament	Thrash metal
10	Better Days	Yellowcard	Pop-punk; alternative rock
17	Everyone's Talking!	All Time Low	Pop-punk; pop rock; alternative rock
17	Divided We Fall	Biohazard	Hardcore punk; rap metal
17	My Heart is an Outlaw	Casey Dienel	Indie pop; dream pop; art pop
17	MotherDaughterSisterWife	Jillian Jacqueline	Country; pop
17	Feral Darkness	Tombs	Black metal; heavy metal
17	Tycoon	Ty Dolla Sign	R&B; hip-hop
17	Invincible	Worldview	Hard rock; heavy metal
17	I Didn't Come Here to Leave	Chris Young	Country
23	Caos	Miguel	R&B
24	You Are Safe from God Here	The Acacia Strain	Metalcore; heavy metal
24	Returning to Myself	Brandi Carlile	Americana; alternative country; folk rock
24	Love Chant	The Lemonheads	Alternative rock; power pop
24	It's Not That Deep	Demi Lovato	Pop; dance-pop
24	Good Story	Eliza McLamb	Pop; indie rock; alternative rock
24	Never Say Yes – 1986	Doug Raney	Jazz
24	Rude	Spiritual Cramp	Hardcore punk; post-punk; garage rock
24	Touch	Tortoise	Post-rock; alternative rock
31	In the Earth Again	Chat Pile and Hayden Pedigo	Noise rock; folk; alternative rock
31	XXV	Greensky Bluegrass	Bluegrass; rock
31	Thick Rich and Delicious	Guided by Voices	Indie rock; garage rock
31	Mammoth	Lydia Luce	Classical; folk
31	Highwallow & Supermoon Songs	Saintseneca	Folk rock; alternative rock; indie rock
31	There's a Ghost in My House	Armani White	Hip-hop

=== November ===
Date	Album	Artist	Genre(s)
7	Echoes in Eternity	Agnostic Front	Hardcore punk; crossover thrash
7	There Is No Memory	Armor for Sleep	Emo; alternative rock; pop-punk
7	Stardust	Danny Brown	Alternative hip-hop
7	...Is Your Friend	Drain	Hardcore punk; crossover thrash
7	Genius	Leah Kate	Alternative rock; electropop
7	Through This Fire Across from Peter Balkan	The Mountain Goats	Alternative rock; indie rock
7	Shish	Portugal. The Man	Alternative rock; indie rock
7	Set It Off	Set It Off	Alternative rock; alternative metal
7	Sad and Beautiful World	Mavis Staples	R&B; soul; gospel
7	Small Talk	Whitney	Indie folk; indie pop; indie rock
14	Wisher	Ben Quad	Post-punk; post-hardcore
14	All Washed Up	Cheap Trick	Hard rock; power pop
14	Flowers	The Devil Wears Prada	Hard rock; heavy metal
14	Ultrasound	The Neighbourhood	Alternative rock; pop rock; indie rock
14	Another Miracle	Of Mice & Men	Metalcore; alternative metal
14	Ash Souvenir	Ragana and Drowse	Black metal; doom metal; alternative metal
14	Everything Is a Lot	Wale	Hip-hop
14	Finally Over It	Summer Walker	R&B
21	Haunted Heart: The Legendary Riverside Studio Recordings	Bill Evans Trio	Jazz
21	Cabin in the Sky	De La Soul	Hip-hop
21	Wicked: For Good – The Soundtrack	Ariana Grande and Cynthia Erivo	Pop
21	Sommi	Snarky Puppy	Jazz; pop; rock
21	The Archaeoptimist	Spock's Beard	Progressive metal; rock
21	The Greatest Gift of All	Stryper	Christmas; hard rock; heavy metal
28	Quarantième: Live á Paris	Dream Theater	Progressive metal; hard rock
28	Dancing with the Devil	Lynch Mob	Hard rock; heavy metal
28	Dark Days	Noah Preminger	Jazz

=== December ===
Date	Album	Artist	Genre(s)
4	The Noise of Say Anything's Room Without...	Say Anything	Indie rock; pop-punk; alternative rock
5	Mercado 48	Daniel Knox	Indie rock; alternative rock
5	A to H	NOFX	Punk rock; pop-punk
5	The World	Seeming	Electronic; industrial
5	Love & Fear	Zac Brown Band	Country
11	Conflict DLC	Health	Noise rock; industrial rock
12	Lightning Might Strike	Juliana Hatfield	Alternative rock; indie rock
12	Light-Years	Nas and DJ Premier	Hip-hop
12	River of Music – The Power of Duets, Vol. 1	Jim Peterik and World Stage	Hard rock; rock
12	Holo Boy	This Is Lorelei	Indie rock; indie pop
12	Mirror Touch	Volumes	Progressive metal; nu metal
19	Peter Criss	Peter Criss	Hard rock; rock
22	Public Domain 7: The Purge	Max B	Hip-hop

== Top songs on record ==
=== Billboard Hot 100 No. 1 Songs ===
- "4x4" – Travis Scott (1 week)
- "All I Want for Christmas Is You" – Mariah Carey (2 weeks in 2019, 2 weeks in 2020, 2 weeks in 2021, 5 weeks in 2022, 3 weeks in 2023, 3 weeks in 2024, 4 weeks in 2025)
- "Die with a Smile" – Lady Gaga and Bruno Mars (5 weeks)
- "Golden" – Huntrix: Ejae, Audrey Nuna and Rei Ami (8 weeks)
- "Luther" – Kendrick Lamar and SZA (13 weeks)
- "Manchild" – Sabrina Carpenter (1 week)
- "Not Like Us" – Kendrick Lamar (2 weeks in 2024, 1 week in 2025)
- "Ordinary" – Alex Warren (10 weeks)
- "The Fate of Ophelia" – Taylor Swift (8 weeks)
- "What I Want" – Morgan Wallen feat. Tate McRae (1 week)

=== Billboard Hot 100 Top 20 Hits ===
All songs that reached the Top 20 on the Billboard Hot 100 chart during the year, complete with peak chart placement.

- "4x4" – Travis Scott (#1)
- "20 Cigarettes" – Morgan Wallen (#20)
- "30 for 30" – SZA and Kendrick Lamar (#10)
- "A Bar Song (Tipsy)" – Shaboozey (#1 in 2024, #2 in 2025)
- "A Holly Jolly Christmas" – Burl Ives (#4 in 2020, #6 in 2025)
- "Abracadabra" – Lady Gaga (#13)
- "Actually Romantic" – Taylor Swift (#7)
- "All I Want for Christmas Is You" – Mariah Carey (#1)
- "All the Stars" – Kendrick Lamar and SZA (#7 in 2018, #14 in 2025)
- "All the Way" – BigXthaPlug feat. Bailey Zimmerman (#4)
- "Anxiety" – Doechii (#9)
- "APT." – Rosé and Bruno Mars (#3)
- "Back to Friends" – Sombr (#10)
- "Baile Inolvidable" – Bad Bunny (#3)
- "Beautiful Things" – Benson Boone (#2 in 2024, #8 in 2025)
- "Birds of a Feather" – Billie Eilish (#2 in 2024, #3 in 2025)
- "Blue Strips" – Jessie Murph (#15)
- "Cancelled!" – Taylor Swift (#10)
- "Choosin' Texas" – Ella Langley (#11)
- "Christmas (Baby Please Come Home)" – Darlene Love (#15)
- "CN Tower" – PartyNextDoor and Drake (#18)
- "Crush" – Playboi Carti and Travis Scott (#20)
- "Cry for Me" – The Weeknd (#12)
- "Daisies" – Justin Bieber (#2)
- "Deck the Halls" – Nat King Cole (#16 in 2022, #20 in 2025)
- "Die with a Smile" – Lady Gaga and Bruno Mars (#1)
- "DTMF" – Bad Bunny (#2)
- "Dum, Dumb, and Dumber" – Lil Baby, Young Thug and Future (#16)
- "Eldest Daughter" – Taylor Swift (#9)
- "Elizabeth Taylor" – Taylor Swift (#3)
- "Espresso" – Sabrina Carpenter (#3 in 2024, #9 in 2025)
- "Eternity" – Alex Warren (#16)
- "Evil J0rdan" – Playboi Carti (#2)
- "Fat Juicy & Wet" – Sexyy Red and Bruno Mars (#17)
- "Father Figure" – Taylor Swift (#4)
- "Feliz Navidad" – José Feliciano (#6 in 2021, #11 in 2025)
- "Folded" – Kehlani (#7)
- "Gimme a Hug" – Drake (#6)
- "Go Baby" – Justin Bieber (#18)
- "Golden" – Huntrix (#1)
- "Good Credit" – Playboi Carti and Kendrick Lamar (#17)
- "Good Luck, Babe!" – Chappell Roan (#4 in 2024, #17 in 2025)
- "Good News" – Shaboozey (#12)
- "Honey" – Taylor Swift (#12)
- "How It's Done" – Huntrix (#8)
- "I Ain't Comin' Back" – Morgan Wallen feat. Post Malone (#8)
- "I Got Better" – Morgan Wallen (#7)
- "I Had Some Help" – Post Malone feat. Morgan Wallen (#1 in 2024, #8 in 2025)
- "I'm a Little Crazy" – Morgan Wallen (#17)
- "I'm the Problem" – Morgan Wallen (#2)
- "It Depends" – Chris Brown feat. Bryson Tiller (#16)
- "It's Beginning to Look a Lot Like Christmas" – Michael Bublé (#12)
- "It's Beginning to Look a Lot Like Christmas" – Perry Como and The Fontane Sisters with Mitchell Ayres and His Orchestra (#12 in 2020, #16 in 2025)
- "It's the Most Wonderful Time of the Year" – Andy Williams (#5 in 2021, #7 in 2025)
- "Jingle Bell Rock" – Bobby Helms (#2)
- "Jingle Bells" – Frank Sinatra (#16 in 2023, #18 in 2025)
- "Just in Case" – Morgan Wallen (#2)
- "Last Christmas" – Wham! (#2)
- "Let It Snow, Let It Snow, Let It Snow" – Dean Martin (#7 in 2024, #8 in 2025)
- "Lose Control" – Teddy Swims (#1 in 2024, #4 in 2025)
- "Love Me Not" – Ravyn Lenae (#5)
- "Love Somebody" – Morgan Wallen (#1 in 2024, #10 in 2025)
- "Luther" – Kendrick Lamar and SZA (#1)
- "Man I Need" – Olivia Dean (#4)
- "Manchild" – Sabrina Carpenter (#1)
- "Messy" – Lola Young (#14)
- "Mutt" – Leon Thomas (#6)
- "My Man on Willpower" – Sabrina Carpenter (#15)
- "Mystical Magical" – Benson Boone (#17)
- "Nobody's Son" – Sabrina Carpenter (#12)
- "Nokia" – Drake (#2)
- "Not Like Us" – Kendrick Lamar (#1)
- "Nuevayol" – Bad Bunny (#8)
- "Opalite" – Taylor Swift (#2)
- "Ordinary" – Alex Warren (#1)
- "Outside" – Cardi B (#10)
- "Pink Pony Club" – Chappell Roan (#4)
- "Rather Lie" – Playboi Carti and The Weeknd (#4)
- "Rockin' Around the Christmas Tree" – Brenda Lee (#1 in 2023, #2 in 2025)
- "Ruin the Friendship" – Taylor Swift (#11)
- "Run Rudolph Run" – Chuck Berry (#10 in 2021, #14 in 2025)
- "Santa Tell Me" – Ariana Grande (#5)
- "Sleigh Ride" – The Ronettes (#8 in 2023, #12 in 2025)
- "Smile" – Morgan Wallen (#4)
- "So Easy (To Fall in Love)" – Olivia Dean (#18)
- "Soda Pop" – Saja Boys (#3)
- "Sorry I'm Here for Someone Else" – Benson Boone (#19)
- "Sports Car" – Tate McRae (#16)
- "Squabble Up" – Kendrick Lamar (#1 in 2024, #5 in 2025)
- "Stargazing" – Myles Smith (#19)
- "Sticky" – Tyler, the Creator feat. GloRilla, Sexyy Red and Lil Wayne (#10 in 2024, #18 in 2025)
- "Sugar Talking" – Sabrina Carpenter (#20)
- "Superman" – Morgan Wallen (#8)
- "Taste" – Sabrina Carpenter (#2 in 2024, #10 in 2025)
- "Tears" – Sabrina Carpenter (#3)
- "That's So True" – Gracie Abrams (#6)
- "The Christmas Song (Merry Christmas to You)" – Nat King Cole (#6)
- "The Fate of Ophelia" – Taylor Swift (#1)
- "The Giver" – Chappell Roan (#5)
- "The Life of a Showgirl" – Taylor Swift feat. Sabrina Carpenter (#8)
- "The Subway" – Chappell Roan (#3)
- "Thriller" – Michael Jackson (#4 in 1984, #10 in 2025)
- "Timeless" – The Weeknd and Playboi Carti (#3 in 2024, #7 in 2025)
- "Tit for Tat" – Tate McRae (#3)
- "Too Sweet" – Hozier (#1 in 2024, #14 in 2025)
- "Travelin' Soldier" – Cody Johnson (#12)
- "TV Off" – Kendrick Lamar feat. Lefty Gunplay (#2 in 2024, #3 in 2025)
- "Twilight Zone" – Ariana Grande (#18)
- "Underneath the Tree" – Kelly Clarkson (#7)
- "Undressed" – Sombr (#16)
- "Voy a Llevarte Pa' PR" – Bad Bunny (#17)
- "Weren't for the Wind" – Ella Langley (#18)
- "What Did I Miss?" – Drake (#2)
- "What I Want" – Morgan Wallen feat. Tate McRae (#1)
- "What It Sounds Like" – Huntrix (#15)
- "When Did You Get Hot?" – Sabrina Carpenter (#17)
- "White Christmas" – Bing Crosby (#12 in 1962, #19 in 2025)
- "Wi$h Li$t" – Taylor Swift (#6)
- "Wood" – Taylor Swift (#5)
- "Worst Way" – Riley Green (#20)
- "Your Idol" – Saja Boys (#4)
- "Yukon" – Justin Bieber (#17)

== Deaths ==
- January 10 – Sam Moore, 89, soul & R&B singer and songwriter (Sam & Dave)
- January 15 – Melba Montgomery, 86, country singer-songwriter
- January 20 – Bob Kuban, 84, R&B drummer
- January 22 – Barry Goldberg, 83, blues & rock keyboardist
- January 27 – Aaron Rossi, 44, industrial metal drummer (Ministry)
- February 1 – Sal Maida, 76, rock bassist
- February 2 – Paul Plishka, 83, opera singer
- February 5 – Irv Gotti, 54, hip-hop & R&B record producer (Murder Inc. Records)
- February 12 – Tommy Hunt, 91, soul singer
  - Betsy Arakawa, 65, classical pianist
- February 20 – Jerry Butler, 85, soul singer songwriter
- February 24 – Roberta Flack, 88, R&B & soul singer and pianist
- February 28 – David Johansen, 75, proto-punk & rock singer/songwriter (New York Dolls)
- March 1 – Angie Stone, 63, R&B & soul singer, songwriter and record producer
- March 3 – Jeffrey Runnings, 61, post-punk singer, songwriter and bassist (For Against)
  - Beau Dozier, 45, R&B & hip-hop songwriter and record producer
- March 4 – Roy Ayers, 84, post-bop & acid jazz vibraphonist and composer
- March 6 – Troy Seals, 86, country singer and songwriter
- March 7 – D'Wayne Wiggins, 64, R&B & soul singer, songwriter and guitarist (Tony! Toni! Toné!)
- March 11 – Bob Rivers, 68, radio personality
- March 13 – Mark Holder, 52, blues rock guitarist (Black Diamond Heavies)
- March 16 – Jesse Colin Young, 83, folk rock singer-songwriter (The Youngbloods)
- April 6 – Clem Burke, 70, punk rock & rock drummer (Blondie, The Empty Hearts)
- May 1 – Jill Sobule, 66, folk-pop & rock singer, songwriter and guitarist
- May 15 – Charles Strouse, 96, composer and lyricist
- May 22 – Daniel Williams, 39, metalcore drummer (The Devil Wears Prada)
- June 9 – Sly Stone, 82, funk & psychedelic soul singer, songwriter and record producer (Sly and the Family Stone)
- June 11 – Brian Wilson, 82, rock & pop singer, songwriter, musician (The Beach Boys)
- June 26 – Walter Scott, 81, R&B singer (The Whispers)
- July 16 – Connie Francis, 87, pop singer, actress
- July 18 – Helen Cornelius, 83, country singer
- July 22 – Chuck Mangione, 84, jazz trumpeter
- July 26 – Tom Lehrer, 97, singer-songwriter and satirist
- August 1 – Jeannie Seely, 85, country singer
- August 6 – Eddie Palmieri, 88, latin jazz & salsa bandleader and composer
- August 20 – Brent Hinds, 51, heavy metal guitarist and singer (Mastodon)
- September 18 – Brett James, 57, country songwriter, producer
  - Diane Martel, 63, music video director, choreographer
- September 21 – Ron Carroll, 57, club DJ, singer and songwriter
- September 26 – Jim McNeely, 76, jazz pianist and composer
- October 10 – Thommy Price, 68, rock drummer (Scandal, Joan Jett and the Blackhearts)
- October 14 – D'Angelo, 51, neo soul & R&B singer and musician
- October 16 – Ace Frehley, 74, hard rock guitarist and singer (Kiss, Frehley's Comet)
- October 18 – Sam Rivers, 48, nu metal & rock bassist (Limp Bizkit)
- October 19 – Dave Burgess, 90, rock singer and guitarist (The Champs)
- October 24 – Benita Valente, 91, opera singer
- October 26 – Jack DeJohnette, 83, jazz drummer, pianist and composer
- October 30 – Scott Sorry, 47, rock singer, songwriter and bassist (Sorry and the Sinatras)
- November 1 – Young Bleed, 51, rapper
- November 3 – Victor Conte, 75, R&B & funk bassist (Tower of Power)
- November 6 – Steve Whitaker, 62, Christian metal drummer (Barren Cross)
- November 11 – Cleto Escobedo III, 59, jazz saxophonist and bandleader
- November 14 – Todd Snider, 59, singer-songwriter
- November 15 – Hilly Michaels, 77, new wave singer and songwriter
- November 19 – Walt Aldridge, 70, country singer and songwriter (The Shooters)
- November 21 – Jellybean Johnson, 69, funk drummer (The Time)
- November 23 – Phil Upchurch, 84, jazz & blues guitarist
- November 26 – Judy Cheeks, 71, soul & R&B singer
- November 29 – Leslie Fish, 81, folk singer
- December 2 – Billy Nichols, 85, soul guitarist and songwriter
- December 3 – Steve Cropper, 84, R&B & soul songwriter and record producer
- December 5 – Camryn Magness, 26, pop singer
- December 6 – Rory MacLeod, 70, blues and swing bassist (Roomful of Blues)
- December 8 – Raul Malo, 60, country rock singer, songwriter and guitarist (The Mavericks)
- December 12 – Manny Guerra, 85, Tejano singer, songwriter and producer
- December 14 – Carl Carlton, 73, R&B, soul & funk singer-songwriter
- December 15 – Joe Ely, 78, alternative country singer and songwriter
- December 24 – Howie Klein, 77, record label executive (Reprise Records)
- December 26 – Don Bryant, 83, R&B singer and songwriter
