= July (album) =

- UK cover

Studio album by Marissa Nadler
- Released: February 4, 2014
- Recorded: 2013
- Genres: Indie folk, dream pop
- Length: 46:03
- Labels: Bella Union; Sacred Bones Records
- Producer: Randall Dunn

Marissa Nadler chronology
The Sister (2012)	July (2014)	Strangers (2016)

Singles from July
- 1. "Was It a Dream" Released: March 10, 2014; 2. "Drive" Released: May 12, 2014

North American Cover

July is Marissa Nadler's sixth full-length studio album, released in North America on February 4, 2014 on Sacred Bones Records, and in the UK on February 10, 2014 on Bella Union. The album was recorded at Seattle's Avast Studios and produced by Randall Dunn. Meeting with a largely positive reception, it debuted at No. 16 on the Billboard Folk Albums chart and No. 14 on the Billboard Top Heatseekers Albums chart. PopMatters called the album a "triumph" and "one of 2014's best albums so far", while Spin called it a "masterfully composed release". Noisey wrote that "the darkly lit July is a moody trip through heat spells and night drives... Nadler's quiet songwriting and ethereal sound give July a sound that's, at times, almost sinister."

== Production and release ==
Like Nadler's previous work, the album is acoustic and blends genres such as indie folk and dream pop, with Nadler writing the songs, singing and playing guitar. According to Nadler, the ideal situations for listening to the album might be "driving on a Nebraska highway" or "some lonely, drunken New York City evening by candlelight." Beyond Nadler, the album also featured a number of guest artists who recorded instrumentals at Avast Studios in 2013. Phil Wandscher also played guitar, with Jason Kardong on pedal steel guitar. Eyvind Kang contributed strings and string arrangements, while Steve Moore of the band Earth contributed keyboards.

The first single from the album, "Dead City Emily", was released in November 2013.

== Reception ==
=== Critical reception ===
Professional ratings
Aggregate scores
Source	Rating
AnyDecentMusic?	7.7/10
Metacritic	83/100
Review scores
Source	Rating
AllMusic	3.5/5 stars
American Songwriter	4/5 stars
Exclaim!	8/10
Fact	4/5
The Irish Times	3/5 stars
Mojo	4/5 stars
NME	8/10
Pitchfork	8.1/10
Record Collector	4/5 stars
Uncut	8/10

July has received mostly positive feedback from music critics. At Metacritic, the album received a Metascore of 83, based on 25 reviews, indicating "universal acclaim". The album received an exact score of 4 out of 5 from the majority of music publications, including AllMusic, MusicOMH, NME, Drowned in Sound, Fact, Blurt and PopMatters, with Pitchfork breaking the trend by awarding the album 8.1 out of 10.

"July is moon music, quiet music, slurp-merlot-in-the-fetal-position music, a slow-burning tapestry of goth-folk torch songs and woozy-pop incantations about love and loss and memory, whispered by the same spirits as Julee Cruise's airy Twin Peaks vocals".
— SPIN

In a positive review, PopMatters called the album a "triumph" and "one of 2014's best albums so far", while Spin included the album on its list of "The Best Overlooked Albums of 2014 So Far", calling it a "masterfully composed release".

About the atmosphere of the album, Vice Media's Noisey website wrote that "the darkly lit July is a moody trip through heat spells and night drives... Nadler's quiet songwriting and ethereal sound give July a sound that's, at times, almost sinister". Noisey further wrote that "her spectral voice earns comparisons to a siren" and the production "adds deadliness to her sound". Steven Rosen of Blurt wrote that Nadler manages to achieve an "almost-hallucinatory effect out of her singing, often multi-tracking the voice to create a ghostly pillowing effect. The production by Randall Dunn highlights this, choosing instruments – strings, synths, piano, pedal steel, Nadler's own reflective acoustic and 12-string guitar – that create a sanctuary, a safe haven, for her to sing these 11 measured, stately compositions".

=== Singles ===
The first single from the album, "Dead City Emily", was positively received by Stereogum as an "ethereal spine-tingler" and by BrooklynVegan as "a track as haunting and delicate as any of her best tracks to date."

== Track listing ==
All tracks are written by Marissa Nadler.

No.	Title	Length
1.	"Drive"	5:36
2.	"1923"	5:39
3.	"Firecrackers"	4:38
4.	"We Are Coming Back"	2:51
5.	"Dead City Emily"	5:54
6.	"Was It a Dream"	3:56
7.	"I've Got Your Name"	2:29
8.	"Desire"	5:32
9.	"Anyone Else"	3:43
10.	"Holiday In"	3:33
11.	"Nothing in My Heart"	2:13

== Personnel ==
- Marissa Nadler - vocals, guitar
- Phil Wandscher - guitar
- Jonas Haskins - bass
- Pat Schowe - drums
- Jason Kardong - pedal steel guitar
- Steve Moore - keyboards
- Eyvind Kang - strings/arrangements

== Charts ==
Chart (2014)	Peak position
UK Independent Albums (OCC)	30
UK Independent Album Breakers Chart (OCC)	6
UK Record Store Chart (OCC)	18
US Folk Albums (Billboard)	16
US Top Heatseekers Albums (Billboard)	14
