= Strangers (Marissa Nadler album) =

Studio album by Marissa Nadler
- Released: May 20, 2016
- Recorded: 2015
- Studios: Litho (Seattle, Washington); Avast! (Seattle, Washington)
- Genre: Dream pop
- Length: 45:01
- Labels: Sacred Bones; Bella Union
- Producer: Randall Dunn

Marissa Nadler chronology
July (2014)	Strangers (2016)	For My Crimes (2018)

Strangers is the seventh studio album by American musician Marissa Nadler. It was released on May 20, 2016, through Sacred Bones Records and Bella Union. It received generally favorable reviews from critics.

== Background ==
Strangers is a follow-up to July (2014). It is Marissa Nadler's seventh studio album. Produced by Randall Dunn, the album consists of 11 tracks. Music videos were released for "All the Colors of the Dark" and "Janie in Love". The album was released on May 20, 2016, through Sacred Bones Records and Bella Union.

== Critical reception ==
Professional ratings
Aggregate scores
Source	Rating
Metacritic	76/100
Review scores
Source	Rating
AllMusic	3.5/5 stars
Consequence	B+
Drowned in Sound	7/10
Exclaim!	8/10
The Line of Best Fit	8/10
Paste	7.7/10
Pitchfork	7.6/10
PopMatters	7/10
The Skinny	3/5 stars
Tiny Mix Tapes	3/5 stars

According to the review aggregator Metacritic, Strangers received "generally favorable reviews" based on a weighted average score of 76 out of 100 from 22 critic scores.

Daniel Sylvester of Exclaim! wrote, "After wading into the murky waters of electronic and goth for her past few releases, Strangers finds Nadler focusing more on core songwriting elements, using her music's sonic textures more for mood." Thom Jurek of AllMusic stated, "The nuanced musical and sonic sophistication on display here is an extension of the songwriter's signature sound, which has perhaps become more accessible." He added, "That said, these changes mark development, not compromise." Philip Cosores of Consequence described the album as "a culmination of years of work, moving past heartbreak and embracing maturity as growth rather than deterioration."

=== Accolades ===
Year-end lists for Strangers
Publication	List	Rank	Ref.
Louder Than War	Albums of the Year 2016	32	
The Quietus	The Quietus Albums of the Year 2016	20	
Spin	The 50 Best Albums of 2016	43	

== Track listing ==
All tracks are written by Marissa Nadler.

Strangers track listing
No.	Title	Length
1.	"Divers of the Dust"	2:44
2.	"Katie I Know"	5:46
3.	"Skyscraper"	4:07
4.	"Hungry Is the Ghost"	6:16
5.	"All the Colors of the Dark"	4:13
6.	"Strangers"	4:12
7.	"Janie in Love"	5:02
8.	"Waking"	2:38
9.	"Shadow Show Diane"	3:16
10.	"Nothing Feels the Same"	3:14
11.	"Dissolve"	3:33
Total length:		45:01

== Personnel ==
Credits adapted from liner notes.

- Marissa Nadler – vocals, acoustic guitar, 12-string guitar, electric guitar
- Randall Dunn – synthesizer (on "Skyscraper" and "Hungry Is the Ghost"), production, recording, mixing
- Milky Burgess – electric guitar, acoustic guitar
- Jonas Haskins – bass guitar, synthesizer bass
- Eyvind Kang – string arrangement, viola, violin
- Jay Kardong – pedal steel guitar
- Steve Moore – piano, synthesizer
- Brad Mowen – percussion
- Steve Nistor – drums, percussion
- Will Smith – engineering assistance
- Jason Ward – mastering
- Ebru Yildiz – photography
- Sacred Bones Design – graphic design

== Charts ==
Chart performance for Strangers
Chart (2016)	Peak position
UK Independent Albums (Official Charts)	18
