= Diamond Heart =

Diamond Heart may refer to:

== Music ==
- Diamond Heart, an album by Ladies of the Canyon
- "Diamond Heart", a song by Lady Gaga from Joanne
- "Diamond Heart", a song by BoA from the album The Face
- "Diamond Heart", a song by Alan Walker
- "Diamond Heart", a song by Marissa Nadler from Songs III: Bird on the Water

== Other ==
- Diamond Heart, a series of books by A. H. Almaas
- A Diamond Heart Production, an artist development label and publishing company formed by Vanessa Silberman
