= The Sister (EP) =

EP by Marissa Nadler
- Released: May 29, 2012
- Genres: Folk, dream pop
- Length: 33:22
- Label: Box of Cedar Records
- Producer: Brian McTear

Marissa Nadler chronology
Marissa Nadler (2011)	The Sister (2012)	July (2014)

Professional ratings
Aggregate scores
Source	Rating
Metacritic	71/100
Review scores
Source	Rating
Paste	9/10
Pitchfork	7.0/10
PopMatters	6/10
Beats Per Minute	75%
The A.V. Club	B+
Consequence	C−
Spin	6/10
The Line of Best Fit	8/10
AllMusic	4/5 stars

The Sister is an extended play by Marissa Nadler. It was released on May 29, 2012, by Box of Cedar Records. Nadler announced the EP on her Facebook page as a "sister album" to her 2011 eponymous album. The album was dubbed by Paste Magazine an "impressive concoction of stark minimalism."

== Track listing ==
All tracks are written by Marissa Nadler.

The Sister track listing
No.	Title	Length
1.	"The Wrecking Ball Company"	4:52
2.	"Love Again, There is a Fire"	2:57
3.	"Christine"	3:33
4.	"Apostle"	3:51
5.	"Constantine"	4:31
6.	"To a Road, Love"	4:14
7.	"In a Little Town"	3:58
8.	"Your Heart is a Twisted Vine"	5:23
Total length:		33:22

== Personnel ==
Credits taken from the album liner notes.

- Marissa Nadler – Guitar, Vocals, 12 String
- Orion Rigel Dommisse – Piano ("Love Again, There is a Fire")
- Amelia Emmett – Vocals ("Constantine")
- Peter English – Drums ("The Wrecking Ball Company")
- Helena Espvall – Cello ("To a Road, Love")
- Faces on Film – Vocals ("The Wrecking Ball Company", "Christine", "Constantine" and "In a Little Town")
- Jonathan Low – Synthesizer ("The Wrecking Ball Company", "Christine", "Constantine" and "In a Little Town")
- Ben McConnell – Percussion ("Love Again, There is a Fire")
- Brian McTear – Drums, Cymbal Swells ("The Wrecking Ball Company", "Apostle", "Constantine" and "In a Little Town")
- Jesse Sparhawk – Bass ("The Wrecking Ball Company", "Apostle", "Constantine" and "In a Little Town"), Mandolin ("In a Little Town")
- Carter Tanton – Electric Guitar ("Your Heart is a Twisted Vine")
