= Butter Miracle, Suite One =

Butter Miracle, Suite One (EP)

EP by Counting Crows
- Released: May 21, 2021
- Genre: Alternative rock
- Length: 18:54
- Label: BMG
- Producer: Brian Deck

Counting Crows chronology
Somewhere Under Wonderland (2014)	Butter Miracle, Suite One (EP) (2021)	Butter Miracle, The Complete Sweets! (2025)

Singles from Butter Miracle, Suite One
- 1. "Elevator Boots" Released: April 27, 2021

Butter Miracle, Suite One is an EP by American rock band Counting Crows. It features four tracks that are connected as a single suite. The song "Elevator Boots" was released as the first single in April 2021 ahead of the full release on May 21, 2021.

The EP was expanded to a full album, Butter Miracle, The Complete Sweets!, with five additional songs, set to be released on May 9, 2025.

== Background and recording ==
Following the release of their previous album Somewhere Under Wonderland in 2014, the band toured extensively for years. Finally on break in 2019, Adam Duritz spent a lot of time at a friend's farm in England and started writing songs for a new album. When the band ran into the COVID-19 pandemic, they were 85% done with recording. The record was later finished in July 2020.

== Reception ==
The EP received generally positive reviews. Henry Yates of Classic Rock scored it a 7 out of 10, writing that "Duritz's melodic powers at full stretch you can't help but be buttered up". Dave Holmes of Esquire called this music "pure Counting Crows, comforting without feeling like a retread, elevated bar rock and beat storytelling unfolding over four tracks".

At PopMatters, Adam Finley rated it an 8 out of 10, stating that "Adam Duritz is a strong contender for the best songwriter of his generation" for music that has "a classic rock feel", with "four disparate compositions [in] a seamless whole". Rolling Stone described the EP as "a melodic, wistful ode to life on tour, with a sound that somehow manages to bridge the gap between The Band and Mott the Hoople."

== Track listing ==
All tracks are written by Adam Duritz.

Butter Miracle, Suite One
No.	Title	Length
1.	"The Tall Grass"	4:34
2.	"Elevator Boots"	3:48
3.	"Angel of 14th Street"	5:01
4.	"Bobby and the Rat-Kings"	5:29
Total length:		18:54

The vinyl version features the song "August and Everything After" (8:41) on the B side.

== Personnel ==
Counting Crows

- Jim Bogios – drums, percussion
- David Bryson – electric guitar, acoustic guitar, mandola
- Adam Duritz – vocals
- Charles Gillingham – piano, Mellotron, organ
- David Immerglück – electric guitar, acoustic guitar, twelve-string guitar, bass guitar
- Millard Powers – bass guitar, acoustic guitar
- Dan Vickrey – electric Guitar, twelve-string guitar, classical guitar

Additional personnel

- Brian Deck – mixing, production
- Dave Drago – backing vocals
- Meghan Foley – art direction
- Beth Hoeckel – artwork
- Neil Strauch – recording
- Curtis Watson – trumpet

== Follow-up ==
Writing for a planned four-song follow-up EP, tentatively titled Butter Miracle, Suite Two, was initially completed by 2022. The intention was to also release both EPs together as a single album. While Duritz was performing backing vocals on two tracks from the Gang of Youths 2022 album Angel in Realtime, he came to believe that the initial songwriting for the second EP was not strong enough. He decided to rewrite the songs and add an additional composition. Recording for the follow-up could only happen once the band was done with touring.

Eschewing a second EP release, a full album titled Butter Miracle, The Complete Sweets! was finished in 2024 and released on May 9, 2025. The album contains five new songs, in addition to the original suite.
