= The Saga of Mayflower May =

Studio album by Marissa Nadler
- Released: January 31, 2005
- Recorded: December 2004
- Genre: Folk
- Length: 35:22
- Label: Eclipse Records; Beautiful Happiness
- Producer: Brian McTear and Amy Morrissey

Marissa Nadler chronology
Ballads of Living and Dying (2004)	The Saga of Mayflower May (2005)	Songs III: Bird on the Water (2007)

Professional ratings
Review scores
Source	Rating
Pitchfork	7.8/10 link

The Saga of Mayflower May is the second studio album by American musician Marissa Nadler, released on January 31, 2005, through Eclipse Records and released later that year in Europe through Beautiful Happiness. The album followed the breakup of her relationship with her previous collaborator, Myles Baer. She explained, "Heartbreak was like water to a plant for my songwriting. I hate to say it was one of the times where I was feeling the most manic and the most inspired".

== Track listing ==
All songs written by Marissa Nadler.

1. "Under an Old Umbrella" – 4:13
2. "The Little Famous Song" – 3:14
3. "Mr. John Lee (Velveteen Rose)" - 3:34
4. "Damsels in the Dark" - 1:37
5. "Lily, Henry, and the Willow Trees" - 2:45
6. "Yellow Lights" - 2:54
7. "Old Love Haunts Me in the Morning" - 3:07
8. "My Little Lark" - 2:54
9. "In the Time of the Lorry Low" - 3:04
10. "Calico" - 3:30
11. "Horses and Their Kin" - 4:30

== Credits ==
=== Musicians ===
- Marissa Nadler - guitar, vocals, 12-string guitar, background vocals.
- Brian McTear - Hammond organ on "Mr. John Lee", "Yellow Lights" and "My Little Lark"
- Nick Castro - tin whistle on "The Little Famous Song", piano on "Old Love Haunts Me in the Morning"

=== Production ===
- Recorded at Miner Street/Cycle Sound Studios, Philadelphia, PA. December 2004
- Recorded, mixed and produced by Brian McTear and Amy Morrissey
- Mastered by Paul Hammond and Paul Sinclair at Fat City, Blue Bell, PA
