= Marissa Nadler (album) =

Studio album by Marissa Nadler
- Released: June 14, 2011
- Recorded: January 2011
- Genres: Folk; country
- Length: 45:00
- Label: Box of Cedar
- Producer: Brian McTear

Marissa Nadler chronology
Little Hells (2009)	Marissa Nadler (2011)	The Sister (2012)

Singles from Marissa Nadler
- 1. "Baby I Will Leave You in The Morning" Released: March 26, 2011

Professional ratings
Aggregate scores
Source	Rating
Metacritic	80/100
Review scores
Source	Rating
AllMusic	3.5/5 stars
Beats Per Minute	81%
Cokemachineglow	78%
Consequence of Sound	B
Drowned in Sound	6/10
MusicOMH	4.5/5 stars
Paste	9/10
Pitchfork	8.1/10
PopMatters	7/10
Slant Magazine	3.5/5 stars

Marissa Nadler is the fifth studio album by American musician Marissa Nadler. It was released on June 14, 2011, by Box of Cedar Records. The song "Baby, I Will Leave You In The Morning" was released as a free download on March 8, followed by a music video for the song.

== Background ==
On November 5, 2010, Marissa Nadler started a Kickstarter campaign to support the start of the album. She received $17,037 from 390 people to start up the campaign. The album was recorded over a three-week period in January 2011.

== Release ==
On March 25, 2011, Nadler announced the release of her eponymous album, explaining:

"It's the most honest, natural record I've ever written... I'm no longer hiding. The mystery still exists in the music as an aesthetic tool, but the songs cut harder because of the vocal mix, with more varied colors than my other records."

=== Singles ===
The first single "Baby I Will Leave You in The Morning" was released on March 26, 2011.

=== Music videos ===
Nadler released her music video "Alabaster Queen" on August 10, 2011, which features director Joana Linda.

The next music video "In Your Lair, Bear" was released on December 14, 2011.

On February 12, 2013, Nadler released the music video to "Wedding" with director Derrick Belcham.

== Tour ==
In support of the album, Nadler went on tour, starting at Bowery Ballroom in New York City on September 9, 2011, and finishing at the Kuudes Linja club in Finland on October 16, 2011.

== Critical reception ==
Marissa Nadler was met with "generally favorable" reviews from critics. At Metacritic, which assigns a weighted average rating out of 100 to reviews from mainstream publications, this release received an average score of 80 based on 19 reviews.

In a review for AllMusic, critic reviewer Thom Jurek said: "Marissa Nadler is, ironically, her lushest, warmest, most sophisticated offering yet, with its lyric and melodic concerns honed to a stiletto's edge. Nothing here feels the least bit overdone. Marissa Nadler is a sensual, provocative, enticing work of vision and maturity." Jordan Cronk of Cokemachineglow wrote: In that sense the record's self-titled nature is a most accurate description: as a reconciliation of her most innate stylistic tendencies it's a beautiful realization of her skills as an arranger and songwriter. Nadler subtly nudges at the contours of her melodies, stretching tracks across a more expansive backdrop than ever before, with strings, keys, vibraphone, slide guitar, cello, and light percussion coloring the mix with a rose-tinted atmosphere of longing and conflicted devotion." At Drowned in Sound, David Edwards described Marissa Nadler as "strikingly beautiful".

Writing for Paste, Stephen Deusner explained: "Nadler emerges with her strongest album yet, a beguiling distillation of her quirks and concerns that nevertheless reveals some new tricks. The self-titled aspect is telling, as this album truly represents an artist coming into her own.

=== Accolades ===
Publications' year-end list appearances for Marissa Nadler
Critic/Publication	List	Rank	Ref
Drowned in Sound	Drowned in Sound's Top 75 Albums of 2011	43	
Obscure Sound	Obscure Sound's Top 50 Albums of 2011	36	

== Track listing ==
Marissa Nadler track listing
No.	Title	Length
1.	"In Your Lair, Bear"	5:59
2.	"Alabaster Queen"	2:30
3.	"The Sun Always Reminds Me of You"	4:25
4.	"Mr. John Lee (Revisited)"	4:39
5.	"Baby, I Will Leave You in the Morning"	4:01
6.	"Puppet Master"	5:11
7.	"Wind Up Doll"	3:49
8.	"Wedding"	3:52
9.	"Little King"	3:38
10.	"In a Magazine"	2:31
11.	"Daisy, Where Did You Go?"	4:25

== Personnel ==
Musicians

- Marissa Nadler – vocals, guitar
- Orion Rigel Dommisse – piano
- Ben McConnell – drums
- Helena Espvall – cello
- Carter Tanton – bass, guitar, tambourine

Production

- Brian McTear – engineer, mixing, producer
- Paul Hammond – mastering
- Paul Sinclair – mastering
- Jonathan Low – engineer, mixing
