= Unstable (Tetrarch album) =

Studio album by Tetrarch
- Released: April 30, 2021
- Genre: Nu metal
- Length: 36:57
- Label: Napalm Records
- Producers: Dave Otero; Joshua Fore; Diamond Rowe

Tetrarch chronology
Freak (2017)	Unstable (2021)	The Ugly Side of Me (2025)

Unstable is the second album by nu metal quartet Tetrarch, released on April 30, 2021. It is their debut recording for Napalm Records.

== Composition ==
Musically, Unstable is a nu metal work, with both the album and Tetrarch credited with playing into the genre's revival. Elements of metalcore also appear, from the "intense" riffs on "I'm Not Right" to "Addicted"'s "pure anthemia".

== Critical reception ==
Professional ratings
Review scores
Source	Rating
AllMusic	4.5/5 stars
Kerrang!	3/5
Metal Hammer	4/5 stars

Upon its release, Unstable received generally positive reviews from music critics.

== Track listing ==
No.	Title	Length
1.	"I'm Not Right"	3:46
2.	"Negative Noise"	4:07
3.	"Unstable"	3:27
4.	"You Never Listen"	3:20
5.	"Sick of You"	3:18
6.	"Take a Look Inside"	3:51
7.	"Stitch Me Up"	3:32
8.	"Addicted"	4:27
9.	"Pushed Down"	2:49
10.	"Trust Me"	4:20
Total length:		37:02

== Personnel ==
Adapted from AllMusic.

Tetrarch

- Joshua Fore - lead vocals, rhythm guitar
- Diamond Rowe - lead guitar
- Ryan Lerner - bass
- Ruben Limas - drums

Technical

- Dave Otero - production, engineering, mixing, mastering
- Joshua Fore - production
- Diamond Rowe - production

Artwork and design

- Alan Ashcraft - artwork
