= New Radiations =

Studio album by Marissa Nadler
- Released: August 15, 2025
- Recorded: 2025
- Studios: Haptown Studios, Nashville
- Length: 46:00
- Label: Sacred Bones
- Producer: Marissa Nadler

Marissa Nadler chronology
The Path of the Clouds (2021)	New Radiations (2025)

Singles from New Radiations
- 1. "New Radiations" Released: June 3, 2025; 2. "Light Years" Released: August 12, 2025

New Radiations is the tenth studio album by American singer-songwriter Marissa Nadler. It was released on August 15, 2025, via Sacred Bones Records in LP, CD and digital formats.

== Background ==
Nadler self-produced the album in her home and at Haptown Studios in Nashville, and recorded it with Roger Moutenot.

The title track was released on June 3, 2025, as the lead single, alongside a music video directed by Nadler and Jenni Hensler. "Light Years" was released as the second single of the album on August 12, 2025.

== Reception ==
Professional ratings
Review scores
Source	Rating
AllMusic	4/5 stars
The Arts Desk	3/5 stars
New Noise	4.5/5 stars
PopMatters	8/10

AllMusic's Marcy Donelson noted the album as Nadler "stripping that sound back down to something more simplified while achieving a similarly haunting astro-folk. At the same time, her memorable narratives remain the stuff of heartbreak, tragedy, history, and lore." Kieron Tyler of the Arts Desk rated it three stars and described it as "very sparse" and "ethereal", stating it "sets its mood and sticks with it." In a similar vein, J. Simpson of PopMatters felt this aspect was one of the album's strengths, arguing that, "Nadler’s music doesn’t need bells and whistles" and giving it an 8/10 rating

Nicole Sacks of Mxdwn commented, "The production of New Radiations is exactly what it needs to be. Marissa Nadler does not stray from the overall theme to prove a point; she remains consistent and true to her sound," and Flood Magazine's Kyle Lemmon remarked, "Much of the album finds Nadler inhabiting distressing character studies as she plucks at her guitar and wrestles with the current state of America through obscured lyrics—a standby scenario for her in the past as both a painter and songwriter."

New Noise's Kevin L. Jones assigned the album a rating of 4.5 out of five and stated, "With its giant soundscapes and Nadler's heavenly harmonies, listening to it while cruising the desert promises to be a positively cosmic experience," calling it "an exploration of atmospheres for Nadler's voice, and not just cavernous ones." Andrew Sacher of BrooklynVegan remarked that the album "hits as hard as anything I've ever heard from her," and is a return "to something more isolated."

== Track listing ==
All tracks are written by Marissa Nadler.

New Radiations track listing
No.	Title	Length
1.	"It Hits Harder"	5:07
2.	"Bad Dreams Summertime"	2:54
3.	"You Called Her Camellia"	4:19
4.	"Smoke Screen Selene"	4:27
5.	"New Radiations"	4:33
6.	"If It's an Illusion"	3:55
7.	"Hatchet Man"	4:29
8.	"Light Years"	3:31
9.	"Weightless Above the Water"	3:33
10.	"To Be the Moon King"	3:37
11.	"Sad Satellite"	5:35
Total length:		46:00

== Personnel ==
Credits adapted from the album's liner notes.

- Marissa Nadler – acoustic guitar, vocals, harmony vocals, production, recording, engineering, album design
- Milky Burgess – electric guitar, steel guitar, organ, synthesizers, arrangements, recording, engineering
- Randall Dunn – mixing, additional synthesizer on "New Radiation"
- Roger Moutenot – associate engineering
- Heba Kadry – mastering
- Ebru Yildz – photography
- Sacred Bones Design – album design

== Charts ==
Chart performance for New Radiations
Chart (2025)	Peak position
UK Album Downloads (Official Charts)	33
UK Americana Albums (Official Charts)	32
UK Independent Albums Breakers (OCC)	19
