= Little Hells =

Studio album by Marissa Nadler
- Released: March 3, 2009
- Genre: Folk
- Length: 42:16
- Label: Kemado Records
- Producer: Chris Coady

Marissa Nadler chronology
Songs III: Bird on the Water (2007)	Little Hells (2009)	Marissa Nadler (2011)

Professional ratings
Aggregate scores
Source	Rating
Metacritic	79/100
Review scores
Source	Rating
Drowned in Sound	(9/10)
Pitchfork	(8.3/10)
PopMatters	7/10
Spin	5/10

Little Hells is Marissa Nadler's fourth full-length studio album, released in March 2009 on Kemado Records. The poster for the Little Hells European tour was designed by Berlin-based poster artist Stefan Guzy.

== Track listing ==
1. "Heart Paper Lover" - 4:08
2. "Rosary" - 3:56
3. "Mary Come Alive" - 4:44
4. "Little Hells" - 2:26
5. "Ghosts & Lovers" - 4:16
6. "Brittle, Crushed & Torn" - 3:12
7. "The Whole Is Wide" - 4:39
8. "River of Dirt" - 4:24
9. "Loner" - 4:49
10. "Mistress" - 5:42

== Credits ==
=== Album ===
- Marissa Nadler - vocals, acoustic and electric guitar, wurlitzer
- Myles Baer - acoustic and electric guitar, theremin, wurlitzer
- Dave Scher - lap steel guitar, organ, piano, synthesizer
- Simone Pace - drums, percussion

=== Production ===
- Chris Coady - production, mixing, programming
- Brendan Muldowny - engineer
- David Tolomei - engineer
- Howie Weinberg - mastering
