= Ballads of Living and Dying =

Studio album by Marissa Nadler
- Released: January 31, 2004
- Recorded: 2003–2004
- Studio: Black Hole Sound
- Genre: Folk
- Length: 36:41
- Label: Eclipse
- Producer: Myles Baer

Marissa Nadler chronology
Ballads of Living and Dying (2004)	The Saga of Mayflower May (2005)

Professional ratings
Review scores
Source	Rating
AllMusic	3.5/5 stars
Dusted Magazine	favourable
Pitchfork	8.0/10

Ballads of Living and Dying is the debut studio album by American musician Marissa Nadler, released on January 31, 2004, through Eclipse Records.

== Background ==
Nadler first began recording her songs onto cassette at an early age. When she turned 16, her parents gifted her a couple hours in a recording studio. When she entered art school in Providence, Rhode Island, she would perform at open mic events. This eventually led to her recording her first album: "I had a boyfriend at the time and he recorded that record for me over the course of many months and we fell in love during the recording, and he ended up being the subject matter for several albums after!"

== Track listing ==
All tracks are written by Marissa Nadler, except where noted.

No.	Title	Lyrics	Length
1.	"Fifty Five Falls"		5:01
2.	"Hay tantos muertos"	Pablo Neruda	2:51
3.	"Stallions"		3:11
4.	"Undertaker"		2:17
5.	"Box of Cedar"		4:39
6.	"Bird Song"		3:07
7.	"Mayflower May"		3:21
8.	"Days of Rum"		4:20
9.	"Virginia"		2:39
10.	"Annabelle Lee"	Edgar Allan Poe	5:15
Total length:			36:41

Vinyl limited edition bonus track
No.	Title	Length
11.	"Door Slam"	2:29
Total length:		39:10

== Personnel ==
Credits taken from album booklet.

- Marissa Nadler – vocals (all tracks), acoustic guitar (all tracks except 8), organ (tracks 3 and 7), keys (tracks 4 and 9), banjo (track 8)
- Myles Baer – electric guitar (tracks 1 and 10), background vocals (track 1), accordion (track 2), e-bow (track 10), recording, mixing, production
- Kendra Flowers – harmony vocals (track 5)
