= For My Crimes =

Studio album by Marissa Nadler
- Released: September 28, 2018
- Studios: House of Lux, Laurel Canyon, Los Angeles
- Genres: Indie rock; indie folk; country
- Length: 34:03
- Labels: Sacred Bones (US); Bella Union (UK)
- Producers: Marissa Nadler; Justin Raisen; Lawrence Rothman

Marissa Nadler chronology
Strangers (2016)	For My Crimes (2018)	Droneflower (2019)

Singles from For My Crimes
- 1. "For My Crimes" Released: June 27, 2018; 2. "Blue Vapor" Released: August 8, 2018; 3. "I Can't Listen to Gene Clark Anymore" Released: September 10, 2018; 4. "Said Goodbye to That Car" Released: December 4, 2018

Professional ratings
Aggregate scores
Source	Rating
Metacritic	77/100
Review scores
Source	Rating
The 405	5.5/10
Albumism	4.5/5 stars
AllMusic	4/5 stars
Clash	8/10
Consequence of Sound	B
Drowned in Sound	7/10
Exclaim!	7/10
MusicOMH	3.5/5 stars
Paste	7.6/10
Pitchfork	7.2/10

For My Crimes is the eighth studio album by American musician Marissa Nadler. It was released on September 28, 2018, under Bella Union in the UK, and Sacred Bones Records in the US.

== Production ==
The album was produced with Justin Raisen and Lawrence Rothman at the House of Lux Studio in Laurel Canyon, Los Angeles, and features collaborations by Angel Olsen, Sharon Van Etten and Kristin Kontrol.

== Release ==
On June 27, 2018, Nadler announced the release of her eighth studio album, along with the title track which features a collaboration by Angel Olsen.

The second single "Blue Vapor" was released on August 8, 2018. "Blue Vapor" was voted Best Song of the Year by Tiny Mix Tapes.

On September 10, 2018, the third single "I Can't Listen to Gene Clark Anymore" was released, which features a collaboration by American actress and musician Sharon van Etten.

== Critical reception ==
For My Crimes was met with "generally favorable" reviews from critics. At Metacritic, which assigns a weighted average rating out of 100 to reviews from mainstream publications, this release received an average score of 77, based on 17 reviews. Aggregator Album of the Year gave the release a 75 out of 100 based on a critical consensus of 19 reviews.

Charles Cook from The 405 said of the album: "Even though themes of distance and time are key players in the message Nadler is trying to convey, the personal heart of the album is often swamped by her trademark ethereal production and sometimes abstract lyricism. The imagery feels both impersonal and melodramatic, without offering any reason for empathy." Liz Ikowsky from Albumism said: "Written in response to the emotional strain of being a touring musician, For My Crimes feels therapeutic and apologetic. The mythic quality of her voice transports the listener, fully enveloping you in Nadler's world." She also noted the songs on the album "reflect a person being confronted with the truth and grieving the mistakes made along the way." Nick Roseblade from Clash noted on the album that "each song plays like an exquisite short story. Through the intricate word play we are given just enough information to know what's going on, but not enough to get the full story." David Sackllah from Consequence of Sound said the album "is a shining example of how Nadler continues to impress and improve upon each release. By putting the focus on her expressive characterization, she moves beyond the forlorn goth label that always seemed to accompany her work."

=== Accolades ===
Accolades for For My Crimes
Publication	Accolade	Rank
Albumism	Albumism's Top 50 Albums of 2018	45
Bandcamp	Bandcamp's Top 100 Albums of 2018	93
BrooklynVegan	BrooklynVegan's Top 50 Albums of 2018	35
BrooklynVegan	BrooklynVegan's Top 141 Albums of the 2010s	133
Fractured Air	Fractured Air's Top 10 Albums of 2018	9
Paste	Paste's Top 20 Folk Albums of 2018	19

== Track listing ==
For My Crimes track listing
No.	Title	Length
1.	"For My Crimes" (featuring Angel Olsen)	4:17
2.	"I Can't Listen to Gene Clark Anymore" (featuring Sharon Van Etten)	2:53
3.	"Are You Really Going to Move to the South?"	3:31
4.	"Lover Release Me" (featuring Sharon Van Etten)	2:27
5.	"Blue Vapor" (featuring Kristin Kontrol)	3:26
6.	"Interlocking"	3:55
7.	"All Out of Catastrophes"	2:12
8.	"Dream Dream Big in the Sky"	2:53
9.	"You're Only Harmless When You Sleep"	2:54
10.	"Flame Thrower"	2:33
11.	"Said Goodbye to That Car"	3:02

== Personnel ==
Musicians

- Marissa Nadler – primary artist (all tracks), producer (all tracks)
- Dana Colley – sax (track 5)
- Eva Gardner – bass (tracks 1, 6, 8)
- Mary Lattimore – harp (tracks 3, 8)
- Patty Schemel – drums (track 5)
- Janel Leppin – cello (tracks 1, 2, 3, 4, 5, 7, 8, 9, 10, 11), mellotron (track 6)
- Angel Olsen – backing vocals (track 1)
- Sharon Van Etten – backing vocals (tracks 2, 4)
- Kristin Kontrol – vocals (track 5)

Production

- Jesse Newport – engineer (all tracks)
- Justin Raisen – producer (all tracks)
- Lawrence Rothman – engineer (all tracks), producer (all tracks)
- Heba Kadry – mastering
- Christen Dute – design

== Charts ==
Chart performance for For My Crimes
Chart (2018)	Peak position
Heatseekers Albums (Billboard)	24

== Release history ==
Region	Date	Label	Format(s)	Catalog
United States	September 28, 2018	Sacred Bones	LP	3102657
United States	September 28, 2018	Sacred Bones	CD	31026
United Kingdom	September 28, 2018	Bella Union	CD	BELLA803
