= Marissa Nadler =

American singer-songwriter

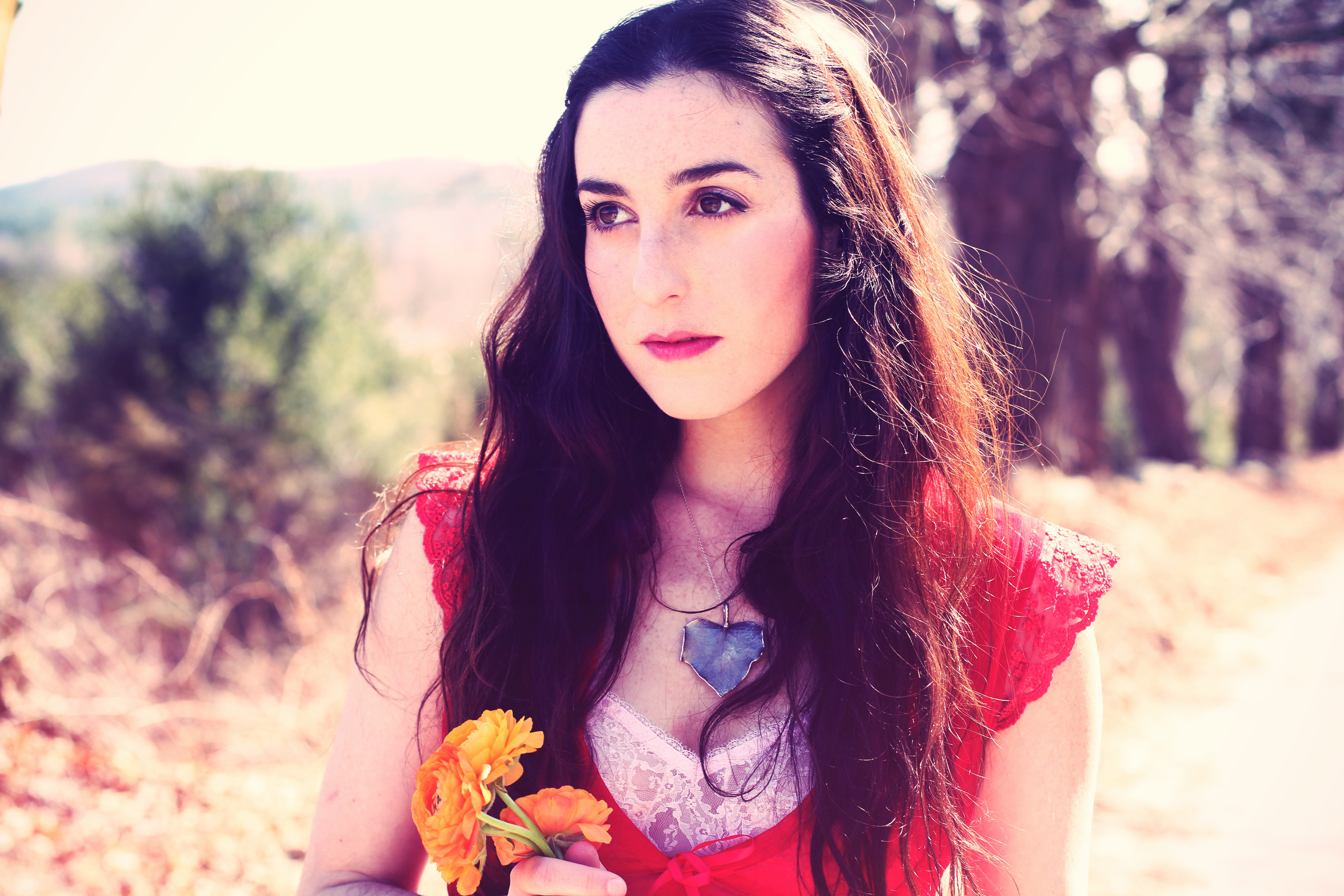
- Marissa Nadler in 2011

Background information
- Born: Marissa Rachael Nadler; April 5, 1981 (age 45); Washington D.C., U.S.
- Origin: Needham, Massachusetts, U.S.
- Genres: Folk; indie folk; indie rock; dream pop; ambient; black metal; Americana
- Occupations: Musician; singer; songwriter
- Instruments: Vocals; guitar; piano; keyboards
- Years active: 2000–present
- Labels: Eclipse Records; Beautiful Happiness; Peacefrog Records; Kemado Records; Box of Cedar; Sacred Bones Records; Bella Union
- Website: marissanadler.com

Marissa Rachael Nadler (born April 5, 1981) is an American singer and songwriter. She is currently signed to Sacred Bones Records and Bella Union, and released her tenth studio album, New Radiations, in August 2025. Her music has been characterized as blending "traditional folk, Gothic Americana, and dreamy pop into an original musical framework". Her music "is rooted in old-school country and folk but brings in elements of experimental and black metal". Sometimes the term "dream folk" has been invoked to describe her work.

Possessing a mezzo-soprano voice, Nadler has received acclaim for her vocals, which was described by Pitchfork as one "you would follow straight into Hades", and also "textured and angelic, with just a hint of pain captured within her iridescent falsetto". The Boston Globe said, "She has a voice that, in mythological times, could have lured men to their deaths at sea, an intoxicating soprano drenched in gauzy reverb that hits bell-clear heights, lingers, and tapers off like rings of smoke".

== Early life ==
Marissa Nadler was born in Washington, D.C. and raised in Needham, Massachusetts. She was raised Jewish. As a teenager, she taught herself to play guitar in a style similar to fingerpicking, playing a steady bass pattern with the thumb and filling out syncopated rhythms with the index finger. It was described as having an "unorthodox, dusky sound". Also while in her teens, she began to write songs as a hobby. She studied painting at Rhode Island School of Design, where she obtained a bachelor's degree in illustration in 2003, and a master's degree in art education a year later. During her studies, she began to perform at open mic events around Providence. While exploring artistic techniques such as illustration, painting, bookbinding, wood carving and encaustic painting, she also honed her songwriting craft. She subsequently recorded an album titled Autumn Rose (2002) as well as the four-track EP Somber Ghost Recordings (2003), neither of which have ever been released. Nadler also contributed to the Pearls Before Swine tribute album For the Dead in Space - Volumes II & III in 2003.

== Career ==
=== 2004–2010: First releases ===
Nadler released her first official album, Ballads of Living and Dying, on Eclipse Records in January 2004. In a positive review, Matthew Murphy wrote on Pitchfork that, "Nadler has the sort of voice that you'd follow straight to Hades. Her luxurious, resonant soprano is immediately transfixing, and throughout these songs it envelops the listener like a dense fog rolling in off the moors." The follow-up The Saga of Mayflower May was released in July 2005. Both records were distributed in the United States by Eclipse, and by the UK label Beautiful Happiness in Europe. Nadler went on some of her first tours with acts such as the late American primitive guitarist Jack Rose and the drone metal band Earth.

Nadler released her third studio album, Songs III: Bird on the Water, on Peacefrog Records in Europe on March 12, 2007. The album was recorded and produced by Greg Weeks of the band Espers in Philadelphia and was subsequently released in the US and Canada on August 12, 2007, by Kemado Records. It was nominated for two PLUG Independent Music Awards in 2008: "Best Female Artist of the Year" and "Best Americana Record of the Year". Nadler also won "Outstanding Singer-Songwriter of the Year" at the 2008 Boston Music Awards, with three nominations altogether.

Her fourth album, Little Hells, produced by Chris Coady, was released on March 3, 2009 and received praise from many critics. including 4-star reviews from magazines such as Mojo, Rolling Stone in France and Germany, Uncut, and Q. It received an 8.3 from Pitchfork. The album departed from the earlier folk-based template with the introduction of electronic elements. In early 2010, Nadler contributed vocals on Portal of Sorrow, the final album by black metal project Xasthur.

=== 2011–2012: Marissa Nadler and The Sister ===
On June 14, 2011, an eponymous record was released worldwide on Nadler's own label, Box of Cedar Records. The song "Baby, I Will Leave You in the Morning" was released as a free download on March 8, followed by a subsequent music video. The album was positively received by Pitchfork, which gave it 8.1 out of 10, and it was called "a stellar collection of sullen melodies and lovelorn anecdotes akin to those of Joni Mitchell".

On May 29, 2012, she released The Sister, a short eight-song "companion" album to Marissa Nadler. The album was dubbed by Paste as an "impressive concoction of stark minimalism".

In November 2012, Nadler collaborated with Angel Olsen on two cover songs that were shared on Nadler's SoundCloud page: the Richard and Linda Thompson song "My Dreams Have Withered and Died" and the Mickey Newbury song "Frisco Depot".

=== 2013–2014: Sacred Bones Records and July ===
"July is moon music, quiet music, slurp-merlot-in-the-fetal-position music, a slow-burning tapestry of goth-folk torch songs and woozy-pop incantations about love and loss and memory, whispered by the same spirits as Julee Cruise's airy Twin Peaks vocals."
— Spin

In 2013, she signed to Brooklyn-based Sacred Bones Records. Her album July was released by the label on February 4, 2014 and on February 10 by Bella Union in the UK. It was recorded at Seattle's Avast Studios, and produced by collaborator Randall Dunn. The first single from the album, "Dead City Emily", was released in November 2013 and positively received by Stereogum as an "ethereal spine-tingler" and by BrooklynVegan as "a track as haunting and delicate as any of her best tracks to date". July debuted at No. 16 on the Billboard Folk Albums chart and No. 14 on the Billboard Top Heatseekers albums chart.

July received positive feedback from music critics. At Metacritic, it received "universal acclaim" with a score of 83 out of 100. A majority of music publications gave July 4 out of 5 stars, among them NME, Drowned in Sound, Blurt and PopMatters, In a positive review, PopMatters called the album a "triumph" and "one of 2014's best albums so far", while Spin called it a "masterfully composed release". Vice Media's Noisey website discussed the atmosphere of the album, writing that "the darkly lit July is a moody trip through heat spells and night drives... Nadler's quiet songwriting and ethereal sound give July a sound that's, at times, almost sinister". Steven Rosen of Blurt wrote that Nadler managed to achieve an "almost-hallucinatory effect out of her singing, often multi-tracking the voice to create a ghostly pillowing effect".

In July 2014, Nadler collaborated with Father John Misty, releasing a split 7-inch on Bella Union. Father John Misty covered Nadler's "Drive", while Nadler covered "Hollywood Forever Cemetery Sings".

=== 2015–2016: Strangers ===
The album Strangers, recorded with producer Dunn in 2015, was released on May 20, 2016, on Sacred Bones and Bella Union. A limited-edition version with original artwork included a pre-release cassette of Bury Your Name. The album release was accompanied by an extensive tour of North America and Europe. In late 2016, Nadler joined Ghost for the US tour.

Strangers holds a score of 76 out of 100 from Metacritic based on "generally favorable reviews". The album was listed on several lists of 2016's best albums to date, including Spin, Newsweek, Uncut and The Quietus. Spin also listed "Janie in Love" as one of the best songs of 2016 so far.

During this period, Nadler directed and animated music videos for Strangers tracks "Janie in Love" and "All the Colors of the Dark", as well as "Blood and Tears", a Danzig cover she had self-released as a digital-only single for Halloween 2015. In late September 2016, a video for the Strangers song "Dissolve", featuring both animation and live performance, was released on Pitchfork.tv.

=== 2017–2018: Leave the Light On: Bedroom Recordings and For My Crimes ===
After touring Europe and North America promoting Strangers, Nadler guested on the Lawrence Rothman album The Book of Law (2017), and on Ojalá (2017), the debut album by Lost Horizons, a duo consisting of Simon Raymonde (Cocteau Twins) and Richie Thomas (Dif Juz, the Jesus and Mary Chain). On September 15, 2017, Sacred Bones released Nadler's first compilation album, Leave the Light On: Bedroom Recordings, a collection of home recordings and demos dating back to 2014. She also self-released two covers albums on Bandcamp for free download.

"The latest in a long career of consistently stellar records, For My Crimes is a shining example of how Nadler continues to impress and improve upon each release"
— Consequence of Sound

Nadler's eighth studio album, For My Crimes, was released by Sacred Bones on September 28, 2018. Rolling Stone wrote that, in contrast to the 2014 break-up album July, For My Crimes, "seems to touch instead on the daily realities of making a relationship work, the epilogue to a happily-ever-after love story when real life kicks in". It was her first album cover to feature her fine art, an untitled painting. The album included guest vocals by Olsen, Sharon Van Etten and Kristin Kontrol. The album's first video, "Blue Vapor", was directed by Thomas McMahan, who "utilizes various experimental and mixed media animation techniques, merging the mood and imagery of the song with hallucinatory visuals..." Nadler's wardrobe in the video for "Blue Vapor" was created and put together by New York-based costume designer and stylist Jenni Hensler, who also styled Nadler's Pitchfork.tv performance clip for the song "Dissolve." For My Crimes was relatively well-received by critics and fans.

=== 2019-2020: "Poison" / "If We Make It Through The Summer" and Droneflower ===
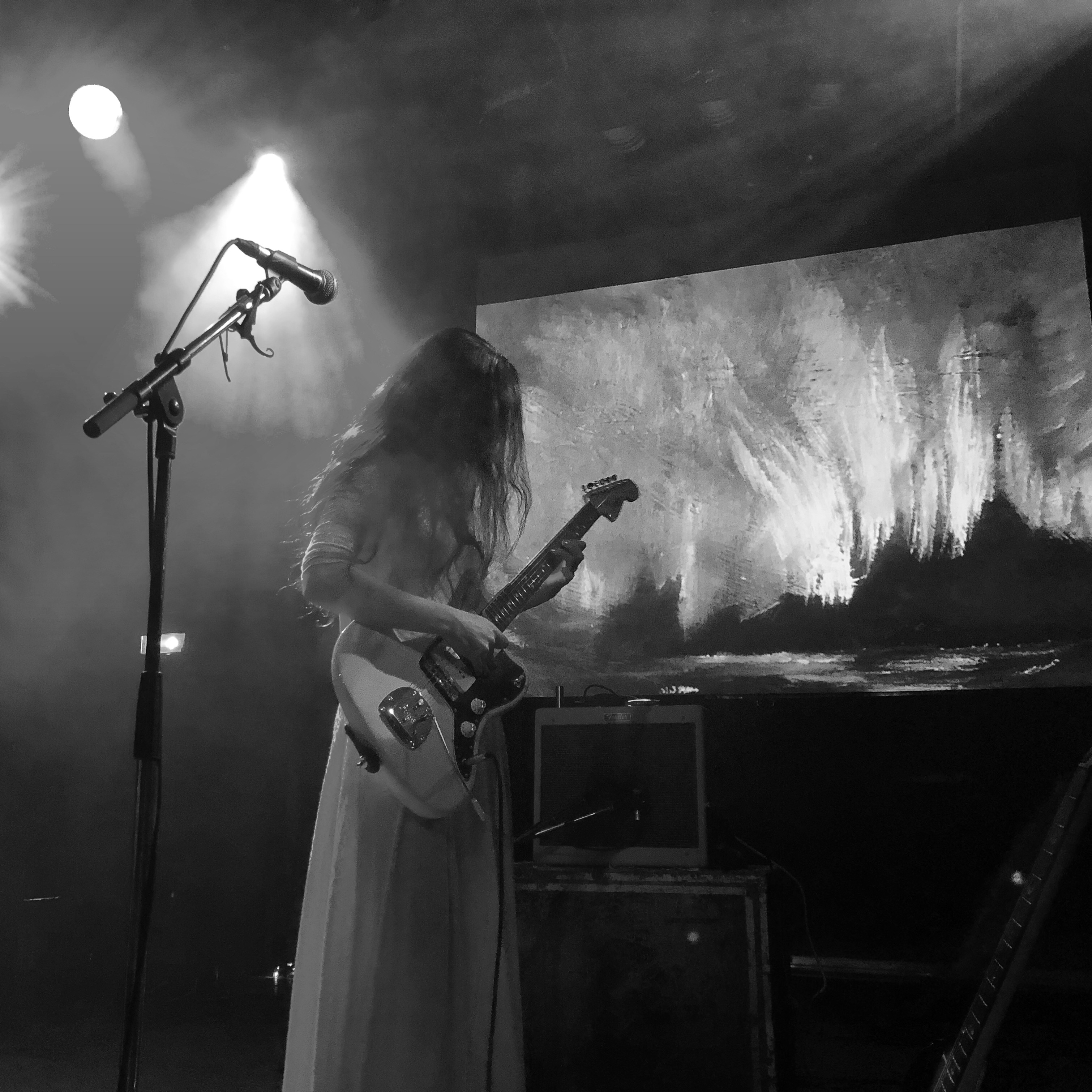
Marissa Nadler performing in 2019 before a reproduction of her painting "For my Crimes" in Groningen

On February 21, 2019, Nadler released a collaborative track with John Cale called "Poison". On the same day she shared another song called "If We Make It Through The Summer". Her collaborative album with Stephen Brodsky, Droneflower was released on April 26, 2019. The album received positive reviews, earning a 8/10 score from Soundblab, 8/10 from PopMatters, 7/10 from Atwood Magazine, 7/10 from Earbuddy, 3.5/5 from The Thin Air and a 4.5/5 from Cryptic Rock. The music website Everythingisnoise remarked, "this mind meld between Nadler and Brodsky is unexpectedly brilliant." and SLUG Magazine called the collaboration a "cosmic collision" in a favorable review. Droneflower was performed at three East Coast shows in June 2019, together with the release of a claymation video of "For the Sun." On December 6, 2019, Nadler and Brodsky released two cover songs on Bandcamp that were not included on the Droneflower album: "In the air tonight" by Phil Collins and "More than words" by Extreme. Nadler's figurative and sonic work again converged at the Grauzone Festival in The Hague in February 2020 with a stage performance and simultaneous exhibition of self-portrait paintings. In addition, 2020 saw the publication two limited-edition books of photography, a cover of Simon & Garfunkel's "Old Friends/Bookends" and two albums of previously unreleased songs and demo versions, Unearthed and Covers 3. 3 July 2020 saw the release of the EP moons which has a meditative, ambient atmosphere.

=== 2021-2024: Instead of Dreaming and The Path of the Clouds ===
In February 2021, she released the single "Sleepwalk & Lonely People", and in May 2021 the compilation album Instead of Dreaming. Nadler released her ninth solo album, The Path of the Clouds on October 29, 2021. Like others, the album found its origins in the Covid-19 pandemic: "Gripped by wanderlust while suddenly housebound at the start of the pandemic in 2020, Nadler escaped into writing, and came back with a stunning set of songs about metamorphosis, love, mysticism, and murder." A review from the magazine UNCUT notes that, "[e]scape is a central theme of the album, and several songs recall historical cases of mysterious disappearances, but infused with personal experience, blurring the line between fact and fiction." This self-produced album contains the most sonically elaborate work of her discography. Various guests make an appearance on The Path of the Clouds including harpist Mary Lattimore and former Cocteau Twins bassist Simon Raymonde. Emma Ruth Rundle contributes a guitar solo to "Turned into Air" and Amber Webber of Black Mountain provides backing vocals on "Elegy". Milky Burgess played various instruments throughout the album.

The Path of the Clouds has received critical acclaim. NME gave the album a positive review, writing, "This is a departure for Nadler in a number of ways, with more sophisticated production, unusual storytelling, and a firm look ahead to her future as an artist (more piano, more power vocally)." Pitchfork awarded the album a score of 7.5, comparing the album favourably to the true crime genre that inspired it: "The thrills of The Path of the Clouds are far richer than most true crime fiction, but like the best examples of the genre, it leaves you breathless." The album received four stars from 8/10 from UNCUT, MusicOMH, Rock n Reel, MOJO, and Record Collector. Other reviewers were even more positive, with All Music Guide (4 ½ stars) praising the "epic, aching songs, which refuse to keep tragedy at arm's length" and Sputnikmusic (superb: 4.5) noting that it "sounds so lush, sweeping, and powerful that all the subtle, intricate melodies are merely the cherry on top." In its five-star "essential" review, Contact Music called the album "exquisitely crafted and utterly beguiling" and recommended that, "The Path of the Clouds … should be listened to, uninterrupted, in its entirety."

=== 2025: New Radiations ===
In June 2025, Marissa Nadler released the title track of her upcoming album New Radiations, accompanied by a self-made video featuring animations of her fine art photography, drawing and painting, followed and videos for Hatchet Man and Light Years. The album was released in full on 15 August. Compared to its predecessors, it has an intimate, lush feeling, full of atmosphere and stacked harmonies. It was produced by Nadler and mixed by Randell Dunn and features Milky Burgess on instrumental arrangements.

The reviews of the album were overwhelmingly positive. About the style, many noted the album’s cohesiveness and consistency. For example, in a 5-star rating HiFi Choice wrote that “Across all 11 songs, Nadler manages a rare feat: balancing expansive, wide-eyed beauty with fragility and vulnerability.” Paste Magazine similarly noted that “Each track immerses you in a haze of contemplation through minimalist production and poetic lyrics” while Pitchfork called the songs "lullabies" that "seem designed to induce the sort of sleep that hovers on the precipice between dream and nightmare.” Stephen Thompson of NPR Music also remarked on this dual quality: “It's got kind of a wispy softness to it but also real heaviness." Finally, KEXP called it, “an emotive set of dark Americana that still radiates warmth, thanks to the rich, vivid textures achieved by her breathy voice, captivating guitar picking, and atmospheric keys.”

With respect to its subject matter, Pitchfork writes that the album “tells stories of surreal and introspective adventure in tones at once heavenly and subterranean” and Amelia Mason of NPR Music noted "this feeling of being like you're in a short story or a novel or a film." According to KLOF magazine, "She is perhaps the most distinctive and gifted songwriter working in the nebulous realm of dark folk, and New Radiations […] could easily become a career-defining album”

The release of the album was followed by a European tour in the autumn of 2025 and a North American tour in 2026.

== Personal life ==
Nadler currently lives in Nashville, Tennessee. She has been open about past struggles with anxiety, depression, and stage fright.

== Discography ==
=== Studio albums ===
List of studio albums, with selected chart positions and certifications
Title	Details	Peak chart position							
Title	Details	United States		United Kingdom					
Title	Details	Folk	Heatseekers	Independent	Record Store	Independent Breakers	Physical Albums	Album Downloads	Americana
Ballads of Living and Dying	Released: January 31, 2004; Label: Eclipse Records; Formats: CD, LP, Digital Download	—	—	—	—	—	—	—	—
The Saga of Mayflower May	Released: January 31, 2005; Label: Eclipse Records; Formats: CD, LP, Digital Download	—	—	—	—	—	—	—	—
Songs III: Bird on the Water	Released: March 12, 2007; Label: Kemado Records; Formats: CD, LP, Digital Download	—	—	18	—	—	—	—	—
Little Hells	Released: March 3, 2009; Label: Kemado Records; Formats: CD, LP, Digital Download	—	—	—	—	—	—	—	—
Marissa Nadler	Released: June 14, 2011; Label: Box of Cedar Records; Formats: CD, LP, Digital Download	—	—	—	—	—	—	—	—
July	Released: February 4, 2014; Label: Sacred Bones Records/Bella Union; Formats CD, LP, Digital Download	16	14	30	18	6	—	—	—
Strangers	Released: May 20, 2016; Label: Sacred Bones Records/Bella Union; Formats: CD, LP, Digital Download	—	—	18	7	3	91	—	—
For My Crimes	Released: September 28, 2018; Label: Sacred Bones Records/Bella Union; Formats: CD, LP, Digital Download	—	24	46	28	7	—	—	—
Droneflower (with Stephen Brodsky)	Released: April 26, 2019; Label: Sacred Bones Records; Formats: CD, LP, Digital Download	—	—	—	36	—	—	—	—
Instead of Dreaming (with Milky Burgess)	Released: May 21, 2021; Label: Sacred Bones Records; Formats: Cassette, Digital download	—	—	—	—	—	—	—	—
The Path of the Clouds	Released: October 29, 2021; Label: Sacred Bones Records; Formats: CD, LP, Cassette, Digital Download	—	—	—	—	16	—	—	22
New Radiations	Released: August 15, 2025; Label: Sacred Bones Records/Bella Union; Formats: CD, LP, Digital Download	—	—	—	—	19	—	33	32

=== Self-released albums ===
- Four-Track Recordings, Outtakes (2005)
- Ivy and the Clovers (2007)
- Little Hells: Acoustic Demos (2010)
- Various Covers Over the Years (2010)
- Covers Volume II (2011)
- S/T Demos (2012)
- Covers (2017)
- Covers 2 (2018)
- Unearthed (2020)
- Covers 3 (2020)
- moons (2020)

=== Compilation albums ===
- Leave the Light On: Bedroom Recordings (2017, Sacred Bones Records)

=== EPs ===
- The Sister (2012, Box of Cedar Records)
- Before July: Demos and Unreleased Songs (2014, Box of Cedar Records)
- Bury Your Name (2016, Sacred Bones Records/Bella Union)
- The Wrath of the Clouds (2022, Sacred Bones Records)

=== Singles ===
- "Diamond Heart"/"Leather Made Shoes" 7-inch (2006, My Kung Fu)
- "Diamond Heart"/"Dying Breed" 7-inch (2007, Peacefrog Records)
- "River of Dirt" CD (2009, Kemado Records)
- "Dead City Emily" digital-only (2013, Sacred Bones Records)
- "Hollywood Forever Cemetery Sings"/"Drive" 7-inch (2014, Bella Union) (split single with Father John Misty) – No. 29 UK Physical Singles Chart
- "Solitude" (Black Sabbath cover) digital-only (2015, self-released)
- "Blood and Tears" (Danzig cover) digital-only (2015, self-released)
- "Janie in Love" digital-only (2016, Sacred Bones Records)
- "All the Colors of the Dark" digital-only (2016, Sacred Bones Records)
- "Poison"/"If We Make It Through the Summer" (2019, KRO Records) (with John Cale)
- "This is Not a Dream" 12-inch (2019, Sacred Bones Records) (with Stephen Brodsky)
- "In the Air Tonight"/"More Than Words" 7-inch (2020, Sacred Bones Records) (with Stephen Brodsky)
- "Where Do I Go" 7-inch (2024, Numero Group) (split single with Happy Rhodes) – No. 21 UK Physical Singles Chart / No. 19 UK Vinyl Singles Chart

=== Guest appearances ===
- Xasthur - Portal of Sorrow (2010, Hydra Head Records)
- Sailors with Wax Wings - "Strange That I Should Have Grown So Suddenly Blind" on Sailors with Wax Wings (2010, Angel Oven Records)
- Cloud Seeding - "Unquestioning" on Ink Jar (2011, Bleek Records)
- Carter Tanton - "Fake Pretend" on Free Clouds (2011, Western Vinyl)
- Hallelujah the Hills - No One Knows What Happens Next (2012, Discrete Pageantry Records)
- Case Studies - "Villain" on This Is Another Life (2013, Sacred Bones Records)
- Emily Jane White - "Dandelion Daze" and "Faster than the Devil" on Blood / Lines (2013, Talitres Records)
- Carter Tanton - "Jettison the Valley" on Jettison the Valley (2016, Western Vinyl)
- Ben Watt - "New Year of Grace" on Fever Dream (2016, Unmade Road)
- Lushlife + CSLSX - "Integration Loop" on Ritualize (2016, Western Vinyl)
- Okkervil River - Away (2016, ATO Records)
- Lost Horizons - "Winter's Approaching" and "I Saw the Days Go By" on Ojalá (2017, Bella Union)
- Lawrence Rothman - "Ain't Afraid Of Dying" on The Book of Law (2017, Downtown Records/Interscope Records)
- Mercury Rev - "Refractions" on Bobbie Gentry's The Delta Sweete Revisited (2019, Partisan Records)
- Slow Dials - "To Be Back Home" (2021, Bandcamp release)
- Lost Horizons - "Marie" on In Quiet Moments (2021, Bella Union)
- Kronos Quartet and Ghost Train Orchestra "High on a Rocky Ledge" on Songs and Symphoniques: The Music of Moondog (2023, Cantaloupe Music)

=== Compilation appearances ===
The following is an incomplete list of compilation albums that include tracks by Nadler.

- "Ballad to an Amber Lady" (Pearls Before Swine cover) on For the Dead in Space – Volumes II & III (2003, Secret Eye Records)
- "Ms John Lee" on New Skin for the Old Ceremony: The Polyamory Nine Year Anniversary Compilation (2005, Polyamory)
- "Your Dreary Days Are Dead" on Talitres Is 5 (2006, Talitres Records)
- "Judgement Day" on Not Alone (2006, Durtro/Jnana Records)
- "Clowne Towne" (Xiu Xiu cover) on Remixed & Covered (2007, 5 Rue Christine)
- "No Surprises" (Radiohead cover) on Reprises Inrocks (2008, Les Inrockuptibles)
- "Lonesome" on Brainwaves 2008 (2008, Brainwashed Recordings)
- "The Kiss" (Judee Sill cover) on Crayon Angel: A Tribute to the Music of Judee Sill (2009, American Dust)
- "All My Trials" on Beautiful Star: The Songs of Odetta (2009, Wears the Trousers Records)
- "Famous Blue Raincoat" (Leonard Cohen cover) on Cohen Revisited (A Tribute to Leonard Cohen) (2009, Les Inrockuptibles)
- "Daisy, Where Did You Go?" on Yuletide (2010, Disco Naïveté)
- "Dead Birds in Arkansas" on Music & Migration II (2011, Second Language)
- "The Killing Moon" (Echo and the Bunnymen cover) on Free Music Impulse (2011, Hybryda)
- "You've Got It All Wrong" on For Tom Carter (2013, Deserted Village)
- "Half as Much" on You Be My Heart (2013, Devon Reed)
- "It's Easier Now" (Jason Molina cover) on Through The Static and Distance: The Songs of Jason Molina (2015, Burst & Bloom)
- "The Kindness of Strangers" on Todo Muere Volume 4 (2016, Sacred Bones)
- "So Long And Far Away" (Karen Dalton cover) on Remembering Mountains: Unheard Songs by Karen Dalton (2016, Tompkins Square)
- "Solitude" (Black Sabbath cover) on Todo Muere Volume 5 (2016, Sacred Bones)
- "Carnival" on One Hundred Thousand Voices (2016, Active Minds, Inc.)
- "Absolutely Sweet Marie" (Bob Dylan cover) on Blonde on Blonde Revisited (2016, Mojo)
- "Rosemary" on Our First 100 Days (2017, Our First 100 Days)
- "Cold Wind Blowin'" (David Lynch cover) on Todo Muere SBXV (2022, Sacred Bones)
- "What Remains" on The Spine of Night OST (2022, Yuggoth Records)
- "Quicksilver Daydreams of Maria," "Sad Cinderella" and "None but the Rain" on Songs of Townes Van Zandt Vol III (2022, Neurot Recordings)
- "Fell on Black Days" (Soundgarden cover) on Superunknown (Redux) (2023, Magnetic Eye Records)

==== Music Videos ====
List of music videos, showing year released and directors
Title	Year	Director(s)	Ref.
"Diamond Heart"	2007	Alina Smirnova	
"Your Heart is a Twisted Vine" (Demo version)	2007	Marissa Nadler	
"Thinking of You"	2008	Jennifer Cox	
"Little Hells"	2010	Si Clark	
"Rosary"	2011	Patrick Fraser	
"Mexican Summer"	2011	Joana Linda	
"Alabaster Queen"	2011	Joana Linda	
"Bird On Your Grave"	2011	Joana Linda	
"The Wrecking Ball Company"	2012	Ryan Hamilton Walsh	
"Wedding"	2013	Derrick Belcham	
"Dead City Emily"	2014	Derrick Belcham and Emily Terndrup	
"Was It a Dream"	2014	Ryan Hamilton Walsh	
"Drive"	2014	Naomi Yang	
"Firecrackers"	2014	Ryan Hamilton Walsh	
"Blood and Tears"	2015	Marissa Nadler	
"All the Colors of the Dark"	2016	Marissa Nadler	
"Janie in Love"	2016	Marissa Nadler	
"For My Crimes" (Acoustic)	2018	Tyler Smith	
"Blue Vapor"	2018	Thomas McMahan	
"Said Goodbye To That Car"	2018	Marissa Nadler	
"For the Sun" (with Stephen Brodsky)	2019	Deborah Sheedy	
"Poison"	2020	Eden Tijerina	
"Marie" (Lost Horizons feat. Marissa Nadler)	2021	?	
"Sleep Walk"	2021	Christen Dute and Tyler Derryberry	
"Bessie, Did You Make It?"	2021	Mitch Wells	
"If I Could Breathe Underwater"	2021	Jenni Hensler	
"Couldn't Have Done the Killing"	2021	Tyler Hollis Derryberry and Christen Dute	
"Lemon Queen"	2021	Eden Tijerina	
"New Radiations"	2025	Marissa Nadler	
"Hatchet Man"	2025	Marissa Nadler	
"Light Years"	2025	Marissa Nadler	
"The Great Below"	2025	Marissa Nadler	

== See also ==
- Dream pop
