= Lydia Luce =

American singer-songwriter

- Born: Lydia Luce; Fort Lauderdale, Florida, U.S.
- Genres: Classical; folk; Americana
- Occupations: Singer-songwriter; musician
- Instruments: Vocals; viola; guitar
- Website: lydialuce.com

Lydia Luce is a folk/Americana singer-songwriter and multi-instrumentalist based in Nashville, Tennessee.

== Early life and education ==
Brought up in Fort Lauderdale, Florida, Luce learned how to play viola and guitar from her mother, who conducted her own symphony orchestra. Her mother was also an organ and a piano player, and her brother, a cellist. By age 13, Luce was performing with her mother's orchestra Ars Flores.

Luce is a Berklee College of Music graduate, who after graduation moved to Washington D.C. to work at The Smithsonian and Folkways Records. She then left for Los Angeles where she received a master's degree from UCLA in viola performance before moving to Nashville.

== Career ==
In 2015, Luce released her first EP The Tides. In 2016, she finished as a finalist at the Rocky Mountain Folk Fest songwriting competition and toured with Sam Outlaw as a fiddle player. In 2017, Luce performed at Merlefest and AmericanaFest, and also toured as an opening artist for Peter Bradley Adams. Her debut album Azalea, released in 2018, was produced by Jordan Lehning and Skylar Wilson.

Luce has also recorded with Joe Pisapia, Joshua Hedley, Eminem, Dolly Parton and Willie Nelson.

== Discography ==
=== Albums/EPs ===
- The Tides EP (2015)
- Azalea (2018)
- Azalea Strings EP (2019)
- Dark River (2021)

=== Singles ===
- "Sausalito" (2018)
- "Helen" (2018)
- "Azalea" (2018)
- "Like You Do" (2018)
- "Golden Days" (2019)

== See also ==
- List of singer-songwriters
