= The Ugly Side of Me =

Studio album by Tetrarch
- Released: May 9, 2025
- Genre: Nu metal
- Length: 32:31
- Label: Napalm
- Producers: Dave Otero, Josh Fore, Diamond Rowe

Tetrarch chronology
Unstable (2021)	The Ugly Side of Me (2025)

Singles from The Ugly Side of Me
- 1. "Live Not Fantasize" Released: September 19, 2024; 2. "Never Again (Parasite)" Released: February 12, 2025

The Ugly Side of Me is the third studio album by American heavy metal band Tetrarch. It was released on May 9, 2025, by Napalm Records, in LP, CD and digital formats. The single, "Never Again (Parasite)", was released on February 12, 2025.

== Reception ==
Professional ratings
Review scores
Source	Rating
AllMusic	4/5 stars
Distorted Sound	7/10 stars
Metal Hammer	7/10 stars
Spill	4.5/5 stars

AllMusic gave the album a four star rating and remarked, "Yet another effortless reimagining of peak-period Y2K nu-metal, the set builds upon their balanced blend of sweeping melodies, brutal sonic attacks, and irresistible singalong choruses."

Melinda Welsh of Spill Magazine stated, "Each track on the album really connects the band with its fans with its deep, dark, lyrics that relate to the daily mental health struggles, while comforting them with the familiarity of Tetrarch's hypnotizing and unmistakable sounds," assigning it a rating of four and a half out of five.

Elliot Leaver of Distorted Sound rated the album seven out of ten, describing it as "arguably the best representation of why it was so beloved" and noting, "it feels like a compilation of all the best bits, a homemade mixtape for Sony Walkmans and cassette players that would be taken on road trips and outings."

Metal Hammer's Merlin Alderslade assigned the album a rating of seven out of ten and stated, "Still, as a fun, energetic metal album for those who have always loved their rock music catchy as hell and brimming with snotty angst, it ticks every box you could ask for."

== Track listing ==
The Ugly Side of Me track listing
No.	Title	Length
1.	"Anything Like Myself"	3:24
2.	"Never Again (Parasite)"	3:24
3.	"Live Not Fantasize"	2:59
4.	"Erase"	2:55
5.	"The Only Thing I've Got"	3:46
6.	"Best of Luck"	3:06
7.	"Crawl"	2:54
8.	"Cold"	2:58
9.	"Headspace"	3:50
10.	"The Ugly Side of Me"	3:15
Total length:		32:31

== Personnel ==
Credits adapted from Bandcamp.

=== Tetrarch ===
- Josh Fore – lead vocals, guitar, production
- Diamond Rowe – lead guitar, backing vocals, production, additional vocals on "Never Again (Parasite)" and "The Ugly Side of Me"
- Ryan Lerner – bass
- Ruben Limas – drums

=== Additional contributors ===
- Dave Otero – production, recording, mixing, mastering
- Mike Low – additional engineering
- Kevin Moore – artwork
