= Songs III: Bird on the Water =

Studio album by Marissa Nadler
- Released: March 12, 2007
- Genre: Folk
- Length: 48:06
- Label: Peacefrog Records; Kemado Records
- Producer: Greg Weeks, Marissa Nadler

Marissa Nadler chronology
The Saga of Mayflower May (2005)	Songs III: Bird on the Water (2007)	Little Hells (2009)

Professional ratings
Review scores
Source	Rating
AllMusic	link
Drowned in Sound	9/10
Pitchfork	8.1/10 link
PopMatters	5/10

Songs III: Bird on the Water is Marissa Nadler's third full-length studio album, released on March 12, 2007 on Peacefrog Records. It was distributed in the US and Canada on August 12, 2007 by New York City-based Kemado Records.

== Reception ==
The album was nominated for Best Americana Record of the Year at the 2007 PLUG Awards; Nadler was also nominated as Best Female Artist. After the album, Nadler also won "Outstanding Singer-Songwriter of the Year" at the 2008 Boston Music Awards, with three nominations altogether.

== Track listing ==
1. "Diamond Heart" – 3:47
2. "Dying Breed" – 3:38
3. "Mexican Summer" - 5:27
4. "Thinking of You" - 3:36
5. "Silvia" - 5:40
6. "Bird on Your Grave" - 5:02
7. "Rachel" - 4:20
8. "Feathers" - 3:59
9. "Famous Blue Raincoat" - 4:23
10. "My Love and I" - 3:32
11. "Leather Made Shoes" - 4:42

The US release of this album included a digital bonus EP with the following tracks:

1. "Conjuring Spirit Worlds" - 5:00
2. "Daisy & Violet" - 3:41
3. "Honey Bear" - 3:25
4. "Cortez the Killer" - 3:57

== Singles ==
- "Diamond Heart"/"Leather Made Shoes" (May 2006)
- "Diamond Heart"/"Dying Breed" (February 2007)
- "Bird on Your Grave" (music video only) (October 2007)

== Credits ==
=== Album ===
- Marissa Nadler - vocals, guitar, background vocals
- Greg Weeks - synthesiser, acid leads, vocals
- Helena Espvall - cello
- Orion Rigel Dommisse - synthesiser
- Jesse Sparhawk - mandolin, harp
- Otto Hauser - percussion

All songs written by Marissa Nadler, except:

- "Famous Blue Raincoat," written by Leonard Cohen.
- "Cortez the Killer," written by Neil Young.

=== Production ===
- Recorded by Greg Weeks at Hexham Head Studio, Philadelphia, PA.
- Produced by Greg Weeks and Marissa Nadler
- Mastered by Mandy Parnell at Electric Mastering, London
- Design by David Lovelock - formerly stuidospecial . Inside photograph by Socrates Mitsios.

== Charts ==
Chart (2007)	Peak position
UK Independent Albums (OCC)	18
