= Jenni Hensler =

American creative director and artist

- Born: Seattle
- Occupations: filmmaker, creative director, visual artist, costume designer, fashion stylist
- Website: www.jennihensler.com

Jenni Hensler is a multidisciplinary artist based in New York City. Her work spans analog filmmaking, photography, costume design, and experiential installations. Hensler initially gained recognition in the fashion and music industries for styling fashion editorials for American Vogue, Vogue Italia, Elle, Interview, and i-D, and for her role as costume designer for artists like Chelsea Wolfe, Zola Jesus, and Marissa Nadler. Her handcrafted costumes and wearable sculptures have been showcased at the Museum of Modern Art and Guggenheim Museum in New York, as well as the Museum of Contemporary Art in Los Angeles.

Since 2017, Hensler has concentrated on her own creative work, creating art films, directing music videos, and continuing to incorporate costume into her art. She was credited as creative director on a short film produced by Stella McCartney and David Lynch titled Curtains Up, as part of a project funded by the David Lynch Foundation, to highlight the power and effects of Transcendental Meditation. Hensler also created "Garden of Ants," an art film that explores themes of innocence and abuse, with an original music score by Chelsea Wolfe and Alex Zhang Hungtai of Dirty Beaches. She was the fashion director for techno DJ Black Asteroid's video "Tangiers," featuring Michèle Lamy, the wife and muse of fashion designer Rick Owens. Hensler has directed music videos for artists such as Zola Jesus, Chelsea Wolfe, and Liz Lamere, the long-time collaborator and wife of Alan Vega of the synth-punk duo Suicide.

== Visual art ==
In 2017, Hensler presented her first art exhibition, a multi-sensory live installation at New York's James Fuentes Gallery, titled Persona Somnia I (Latin for "Dream Persona"). The exhibition featured Spanish performance artist María Forqué suspended from the ceiling by intricately knotted shibari ropes, accompanied by an ambient soundscape. Hensler described it as "a visual, sonic and tactile exploration of a kaleidoscopic, fragmented self as it merges into a whole," and elaborated that "the exhibit explores the act of viewing as a reciprocal one... We experience ourselves as living mirrors of each other."

Hensler is also a creator of art films, including Garden of Ants, a work exploring themes of innocence and abuse, with an original music score by Chelsea Wolfe and Alex Zhang Hungtai of Dirty Beaches. Her work in this medium has further expanded into a blend of film, performance, and installation art. She often incorporates her costume design into these projects, blending different artistic disciplines into visual narratives. Prior to her exhibition at James Fuentes Gallery, Hensler shared a residency space at the Park Avenue Armory, where she developed new work and expanded her artistic practice.

In addition to her art films, Hensler is a published photographer, working primarily with 35mm film. She takes candid portraits of people, often in black-and-white or highly saturated monochromatic colors, using dramatic chiaroscuro lighting techniques. This can be seen in the series of a portraits she did for the July 2019 issue of Nasty Magazine. Her photographic work was also featured in the second issue of We Understand the Future magazine from Basel, Switzerland, in September 2024.

== Directing ==
Hensler has directed several music videos, including "If I Could Breathe Underwater" by Marissa Nadler, "The Fall" by Zola Jesus, Moondog's "High on a Rocky Ledge" (performed by Kronos Quartet and Ghost Train Orchestra), "Lights Out" by Liz Lamere, as well as videos for Johnny Based ("Virus"), Liz Lamere ("Sin"), and November Girl ("Beam Me Up"). She has also served as creative director for a photo shoot for Red Bull Music Academy.

== Costume design and styling ==
Hensler's costume and styling work can be seen in numerous music videos by a variety of artists, such as in the Chelsea Wolfe videos for the songs "Carrion Flowers," "16 Psyche," "Flatlands," "Spun," and "Be All Things," and she has created stage costumes for Wolfe's concert tours and festival appearances. Hensler costume designed and styled the Zola Jesus videos for "Dangerous Days," "Seekir," "Hunger," "Nail," and "Exhumed," and the Marissa Nadler videos for "Blue Vapor" and "Dissolve," the latter of which was produced for Pitchfork.tv. In addition to those, Hensler styled the electronic musician Black Marble's video for the song "Cruel Summer," Australian electronic act HTRK's video for the song "Chinatown Style," indie pop band Lower Dens' video for the song "Real Thing," and the video for the collaboration between Dutch composer Jozef van Wissem and American filmmaker-composer Jim Jarmusch for their minimalist classical music piece "Etimasia." She appeared in the Chelsea Wolfe video for "Spun," and in the HTRK videos for "Chinatown Style" and "New Year's Day," which was directed by collaborator Nathan Corbin.

Hensler has been a crew member on a number of independent narrative films as well, including as the costume designer on the short film The Puppet Man, which features horror-film director John Carpenter, and which was screened at the 2016 Sundance Film Festival.

== Influences and vision ==
The vision behind Hensler's art, films, and installations draws on and incorporates elements of diverse eras, visual traditions, and movements, such as magic realism and dark surrealism, esoteric and occult symbology, Japanese minimalism, ancient Egypt, and classical mythology, as various Greco-Roman motifs, shapes, and silhouettes appear throughout her work. She describes herself as being inspired by the Jungian concept of archetypes that inhabit humanity's collective unconscious, and she has said, "Creating a dream world in the waking world is a major part of what I like to do," "[m]ixing dreams with reality... One of my passions is to create ways to take others into this place. To open a part of the psyche and create a dream-like psychedelic experience which connects everyone using minimal elements." According to one fashion commentator, Hensler "creates wearable works of art, melding mysticism and ethereal beauty with the strict order of natural science."

Hensler favors an aesthetic that projects female power, mystery, and eroticism. The looks she created as a designer and stylist alternate between or juxtapose voluminous dresses, cloaks, and sleeves with bare skin and tight-fitting pieces, and she has made wearable sculptures from wood, metal, PVC, and leather, often paired with large-sole boots or shoes, and accented with headpieces, veils, and jewelry. She has created wearable sculptures using LED lights and has hand-painted directly onto fabric as well. She has been said to create esoteric, "borderline-spiritual looks [that] seem to draw inspiration from the occult, fetish wear, and fantasy." Her designers of choice, who serve as influences on some of her signature looks, include Thierry Mugler, Maison Margiela, Yohji Yamamoto, Rick Owens, Ann Demeulemeester, and A.F. Vandevorst.
