= Butter Miracle, The Complete Sweets! =

Butter Miracle: The Complete Sweets!

Studio album by Counting Crows
- Released: May 9, 2025
- Genres: Alternative rock, roots rock
- Length: 40:48
- Label: BMG
- Producer: Brian Deck

Counting Crows chronology
Butter Miracle, Suite One (EP) (2021)	Butter Miracle: The Complete Sweets! (2025)

Singles from Butter Miracle, The Complete Sweets!
- 1. "Spaceman in Tulsa" Released: February 21, 2025; 2. "Under the Aurora" Released: April 4, 2025

Butter Miracle, The Complete Sweets! is the eighth studio album by American rock band Counting Crows, released on May 9, 2025 by BMG. It is a follow-up to the 2021 EP Butter Miracle, Suite One, expanding the EP into a full album, and the band's first full-length album of original material since Somewhere Under Wonderland in 2014.

== Background and recording ==
Writing for a planned four-song follow-up EP to the 2021 EP Butter Miracle, Suite One, tentatively titled Butter Miracle, Suite Two, was initially completed by 2022. The intention was to also release both EPs together as a single album. While Duritz was performing backing vocals on two tracks from the Gang of Youths 2022 album Angel in Realtime, he came to believe that the initial songwriting for the second EP was not strong enough. He decided to rewrite the songs and add an additional composition. Recording for the follow-up could only happen once the band was done with touring.

Eschewing a second EP release, the full nine-track album, with five new songs in addition to the original suite, was finished in 2024, and was released on May 9, 2025.

== Track listing ==
All tracks are written by Adam Duritz.

Butter Miracle, The Complete Sweets! track listing
No.	Title	Length
1.	"With Love, From A-Z"	4:42
2.	"Spaceman in Tulsa"	3:50
3.	"Boxcars"	3:51
4.	"Virginia Through The Rain"	3:56
5.	"Under the Aurora"	5:41
6.	"The Tall Grass"	4:34
7.	"Elevator Boots"	3:48
8.	"Angel of 14th Street"	5:01
9.	"Bobby and the Rat-Kings"	5:29
Total length:		40:48

== Personnel ==
Counting Crows

- Jim Bogios – drums, percussion, harmony vocals
- David Bryson – guitar, acoustic guitar, harmony vocals
- Adam Duritz – lead vocals, piano, harmony vocals
- Charlie Gillingham – keyboards, piano, Hammond B3 organ, Mellotron, harmony vocals
- David Immerglück – guitar, pedal steel guitar, mandolin, vocals, harmony vocals
- Millard Powers – bass guitar, harmony vocals
- Dan Vickrey – guitar, 12-string guitar, harmony vocals

Additional musicians

- Dave Drago – backing vocals - Tracks 6–9
- Curtis Watson – trumpet - Tracks 6–9

Technical personnel

- Brian Deck – production
- Tchad Blake – mixing
- Meghan Foley – art direction
- Beth Hoeckel – artwork
- Neil Strauch – recording

== Charts ==
Chart performance for Butter Miracle, The Complete Sweets!
Chart (2025)	Peak position
French Rock & Metal Albums (SNEP)	53
Scottish Albums (Official Charts)	13
Swiss Albums (Schweizer Hitparade)	90
UK Albums (Official Charts)	81
UK Independent Albums (Official Charts)	4
