= Tetrarch (band) =

American nu metal band

- Origin: Atlanta, Georgia, U.S.
- Genres: Nu metalcore, nu metal, metalcore
- Years active: 2006–present
- Label: Napalm
- Members: Josh Fore; Diamond Rowe; Ryan Lerner; Ruben Limas
- Past members: Tyler Wesley; Nick Jones; Jared Vann; Michael Bowles; Thomas Taylor; Jake Wertman; Dillon Forret
- Website: tetrarch.komi.io

Tetrarch is an American heavy metal band originally from Atlanta, Georgia, now based in Los Angeles. They have released three EPs, five singles and three albums.

== History ==
=== Formation, Pravda EP, The Will to Fight EP (2006–2012) ===
Tetrarch was formed in Atlanta in 2006 by Diamond Rowe and Josh Fore. According to lead guitarist Diamond Rowe, "Tetrarch began their live shows in the local scene, playing their first show at the 7 Venue in Douglasville, Georgia. They spent the rest of 2007 perfecting their live performance by playing close to 100 shows, which started a buzz in the Atlanta area. They released their first EP, Pravda in the summer of 2008, which was recorded at Ledbelly Studios by Matthew Washburn. To support their first release, Tetrarch continued to play in Atlanta while expanding their reach regionally with mini tours in the south east. In 2009, Tetrarch started working with producer Russ-T Cobb at Bang Studios in Atlanta. The band released the "Disciples of Sorrow" single from those sessions. The single caught the attention of Atlanta's biggest Rock Station, "Project 9-6-1" (96.1FM), where the band was featured for multiple weeks on the air. Tetrarch hit the studio again in late 2010 with producer Matthew Laplant at Bieler Bros studio in Pompano Beach, FL". On May 5, 2011, while the EP was being finished, they were asked to play the main stage, supporting Avenged Sevenfold, Seether, and Alter Bridge at Verizon Wireless Amphitheater in Atlanta. With this performance, the band saw their fan base continue to grow. As a result, the band released their biggest EP to date, The Will to Fight, in the summer of 2011. "We Are The Hunters", the first single released from the EP, quickly gained attention from the metal blogs and consumers. In the summer of 2011, Tetrarch got their first taste at extensive touring by doing a 40-day east coast tour in support of the EP. The band finished the year off with a few hometown shows in Atlanta and made preparations for the busy year that was ahead of them. According to OurStage.com, Tetrarch reached two "Top 100 and three Top 40 finishes" with this EP. In the summer of 2012, Tetrarch was in Audiohammer Studios in Sanford, FL with Jason Suecof and Eyal Levi working on a their Relentless EP, a follow-up to 2011's The Will to Fight.

=== Relentless EP (2013) ===
Tetrarch's new EP entitled Relentless was released on March 19, 2013. Relentless was produced by Eyal Levi and Jason Suecof at Audiohammer Studios in Sanford, Florida. The EP's artwork was done by McBridge Design. According to lead guitarist Diamond Rowe, "Relentless is very different from [the] last EP, The Will to Fight, but at the same time you can still tell that it is the same band." The first single was the title track, released on February 24, 2013. On March 3, 2013, the band released "Take Your Best Shot" as their second single; and on March 15, 2013 "Final Words" was released as their third single. A music video for "Final Words" was released exclusively through Revolver Magazine on March 15, 2013. This music video was directed by Jeffrey Moore. Lead guitarist Diamond Rowe was featured in the book "WHAT ARE YOU DOING HERE? A Black Woman's Life and Liberation in Heavy Metal", by Laina Dawes. The book "investigates how black women musicians and fans navigate the metal, hardcore, and punk music genres that are regularly thought of as inclusive spaces and centered on a community spirit, but fail to block out the race and gender issues that exist in the outside world." The band headlined their first shows of 2013 on May 24 at The Masquerade in Atlanta, GA and May 25 at Firewater 110 in Rock Hill, SC. On July 5, 2013, the band announced their first complete tour, headlining the "Here We Stand Tour" (August–September 2013) sponsored by Outerloop Management. The band closed the year out with 3 shows from December 13–15, 2013 spanning from Albany, Georgia at The Oglethorpe Lounge to Port Charlotte, Florida at Voodoo.

=== New album (2013–2017) ===
The band entered Audiohammer Studios in Sanford, Florida with Eyal Levi to record their newest album on December 16, 2013; which followed a 3-day headliner (December 13–15, 2013) spanning from Albany, Georgia to Port Charlotte, Florida. The Port Charlotte date was moved to The Goathouse in Odessa, Florida with Illuminate Me. To open 2014, Tetrarch are scheduled to provide support to Straight Line Stitch, Goodbye October, and Viscera on January 17, 2014, at The Lantern (relocated from DJ's Tavern) in Rome, Georgia; and are also scheduled to headline the "Hometown Throwdown" on January 18, 2014, at The Masquerade in Atlanta with support from Prime Mover, As Animals Eat My Insides, and Living With Strangers. The band's first confirmed tour of 2014 was an east coast headliner, "The Please Don't Snow" Tour (January 23–30, 2014) that reached from South Carolina to Pennsylvania. On February 6, 2014, the band announced their headliner "The Take Your West Shot Tour" (February 21 – March 1, 2014) that reaches from Albany, Georgia to Terrell, Texas. Tetrarch has tentative/unannounced tours scheduled in the United States and Canada for the remainder of 2014.

=== Freak and Unstable (2017–current) ===
In 2017, the band released Freak. On May 15, 2017, the band released a music video for the song "I'm Not Right". On February 4, 2021, the band announced that their latest album Unstable would be released on April 30, 2021. The song "You Never Listen" was elected by Loudwire as the 23rd best metal song of 2021.

== Notable events ==
In October of 2024, Diamond Rowe became the first woman to be given a customized signature guitar from Jackson Guitars and the first black female metal artist to have a signature guitar from any manufacturer.

== Influences ==
The bands that influenced Tetrarch are Linkin Park, Korn, Disturbed, System of a Down, Limp Bizkit, Slipknot, Mudvayne, Metallica, Megadeth, Pantera, Lamb of God, Trivium, Guns N' Roses, Green Day, Pearl Jam, Nirvana, Nothing More, and Rise Against. Diamond Rowes influences on her guitar playing style are Dimebag Darrell, Head, Dan Donegan, Slash, Mark Morton, Zakk Wylde, Kirk Hammett, Dave Mustaine and James Hetfield.

== Band members ==
=== Current members ===
- Josh Fore – lead vocals, rhythm guitar (2006–present), drums (2012–2015)
- Diamond Rowe – lead guitar, backing vocals (2006–present)
- Ryan "Doom" Lerner – bass, backing vocals (2009–present)
- Ruben Limas – drums, percussion (2015–present)

=== Former members ===
- Thomas Taylor – bass (2007–2008)
- Tyler Wesley – drums, percussion (2007–2010)
- Michael Bowles – bass (2008–2009)
- Nick Jones – drums, percussion (2010–2011)
- Jared Vann – drums, percussion (2011–2012)

== Discography ==
=== Albums ===
- Freak (Self-released, 2017)
- Unstable (Napalm, 2021)
- The Ugly Side of Me (Napalm, 2025)

=== EPs ===
- Fate of the Chosen demo (Self-released, 2007)
- Pravda (Self-released, 2008)
- The Will to Fight (Self-released, 2011)
- Relentless (Self-released, 2013)

=== Singles ===
Title	Year	Peak chart positions	Album
Title	Year	US Main.	Album
"Disciples of Sorrow"	2009	—	Non-album single
"We Are the Hunters"	2011	—	The Will to Fight
"Relentless"	2013	—	Relentless
"Take Your Best Shot"	2013	—	Relentless
"Final Words"	2013	—	Relentless
"Break the Trend"	2017	—	Freak
"Freak"	2017	—	Freak
"Pull the Trigger"	2017	—	Freak
"I'm Not Right"	2020	27	Unstable
"You Never Listen"	2021	31	Unstable
"Negative Noise"	2021	—	Unstable
"Addicted"	2021	—	Unstable
"Sick of You"	2022	39	Unstable
"Live Not Fantasize"	2024	38	The Ugly Side of Me
"Never Again (Parasite)"	2025	—	The Ugly Side of Me
"Cold"	2025	—	The Ugly Side of Me
"Best of Luck"	2025	—	The Ugly Side of Me

== Music videos ==
Year	Song	Director
2017	"Oddity"	Scott Hansen & Desiree Connell
2018	"Freak"	Brian Kirks
2020	"I'm Not Right"	Scott Hansen
2021	"You Never Listen"	Vicente Cordero
2021	"Negative Noise"	Vicente Cordero
2021	"Stitch Me Up"	Vicente Cordero
2024	"Live Not Fantasize"	Vicente Cordero
2025	"Never Again (Parasite)"	Vicente Cordero
