= Jonas Haskins =

American guitarist

Jonas Haskins is the former bass player for the drone metal band Earth. Prior to playing in Earth, he was a part of numerous obscure Seattle-based bands, such as The Jesus Chords. He also has collaborated with Sera Cahoone. Also, Haskins is a former employee of AdReady, Inc. based in Seattle, Washington where he worked as Senior Network Administrator.

== Biographical Information ==
Jonas grew up in the San Juan islands of the Puget Sound. As a boy he enjoyed visiting the various creameries and sweet shops in Friday Harbor, but his real passion was for the baritone guitar. As his hair grew, he found that his knowledge of music theory, his ear for pitch, and his pizazz and style called for him to bring his talent into the Seattle music scene.
