= Modulations: Cinema for the Ear =

Modulations
- Directed by: Iara Lee
- Produced by: George Gund III
- Cinematography: Marcus Burnett; Paul Yates
- Edited by: Paula Heredia
- Music by: Karlheinz Stockhausen
- Release date: January 21, 1998 (Sundance)
- Country: United States
- Language: English

Modulations: Cinema for the Ear is a 1998 American documentary film on the history of electronic music. It is accompanied by a soundtrack album and the 2000 book Modulations: A History of Electronic Music by Peter Shapiro. The project was directed by Iara Lee, the maker of the documentary film Synthetic Pleasures.

== Reception ==
On the review aggregator website Rotten Tomatoes, 33% of six critics' reviews are positive.

In a negative review, Ron Wells of Film Threat wrote, "It's ironic that a film about music you stay up all night listening to, just put me to sleep."

Stephen Holden of The New York Times was more positive, writing, "[D]espite its shortcomings, Modulations is an invaluable primer that begins to make sense of a rapidly changing sonic world that in many people's minds is only a grating, intimidating jumble of unwelcome noise."

== Soundtrack ==
Modulations: Cinema for the Ear

Soundtrack album
- Released: October 6, 1998
- Genre: Electronic music
- Length: 75 min
- Label: Caipirinha Productions
- Compiler: Caipirinha Productions

1. "I Feel Love" – Donna Summer
2. "Planet Rock" – Afrika Bambaataa & Soulsonic Force
3. "No UFO's" (remix) – Model 500
4. "Simon from Sydney" – LFO
5. "Strings of Life" – Rhythm Is Rhythm
6. "Yeah" – Jesse Saunders
7. "Amazon 2-King of the Beats" – Aphrodite
8. "Stormbringer" – Panacea
9. "The Shadow" – Rob & Goldie
10. "Luxus 1-3" – Ryoji Ikeda
11. "Atomic 2000" – Coldcut
12. "Kritische Masse 1" – To Rococo Rot
