= Flaming Fire =

The Flaming Fire
- Origin: Brooklyn, New York, United States
- Genre: Rock
- Years active: 2000–present
- Labels: Silly Bird Records (U.S.); Cuniglius Records (U.S.)
- Members: Patrick Hambrecht; Lauren Weinstein; Theo Edmands; Kathleen Peistrup Hambrecht; Lou Underwood; Lisa Darrow Badavi; Banjo Pete; Camilla Ha; Jonathan Ackerman; John Mathias; Sheila Bosco; Danny Tunick; Brian Wilson; Leon Dewan; Brian Dewan; Zach Layton; Sarah Blust; JZ Barrell; Josh Aerosols; Rob Aerosols; Joe Armin Aerosol; Mark Wolberg; Natasha Lewin; Natalie Unicorn; John Keen; Dale W. Miller of Palomar (band); John drummer from Helios Creed; Joe McGinty; Chris Talsness; Polly Watson; Stirling Kusing; Amanda Sayle Rinzel; Anna Copa Cabanna; Gabriel Galvin; Nick Anderson; Justina Heckard; Trent Wolbe; Maria Levitsky; Sam Goldsmith; Chris Theise; Pamelia Kurstin; Jorge Antonius; Arthur Owens; Lennon Olivia
- Website: flamingfire.com

Flaming Fire is an American arts collective and experimental rock band from Brooklyn, New York, United States, which formed in 2000.

Other projects include live performance, film, comics and the Flaming Fire Illustrated Bible (described as the largest illustrated Bible in the world).

The band is on avant rock label Silly Bird Records, home to bands like Autobody and the Irving Klaw Trio. Their projects and music have been featured in such news and music publications as The New York Times, Arthur Magazine, The New Yorker, Vice Magazine, The Boston Globe, Venus Magazine, The Omaha World Herald, The Omaha Reader, The Lincoln Journal Star, Blastitude, Dead Angel, Mick Mercer's The Mick and Baltimore City Paper.

The group features cartoonist Lauren Weinstein on lead vocals with Patrick Hambrecht, the band songwriter. Hambrecht, a Southern Baptist from Papillion, Nebraska, moved to New York City in 1996. Their music has been described as a mix of psychedelic folk, noise music and pop music, similar to other New Weird America artists, but with a more aggressive, transgressive bent, akin to bands like Psychic TV. The group's prior incarnation, Rock Rock Chicken Pox, featured Dame Darcy and members of Laddio Bolocko.

The band has three albums; Get Old and Die with Flaming Fire, Songs from the Shining Temple and When the High Bell Rings. Their music has been featured on various compilations, including WFMU's Tunes From the Toxic Terrain and Psycho-O-Path Records' Space is No Place, NYC: Noise from the Underground.

In December 2009, the arts collective organized a holiday art show and performance space in Brooklyn entitled "The Flaming Fire Temple Presents: Eternal Christmas – A Yuletide Dreamland", sponsored by Atlantic Assets and Issue Project Room. The show featured visual art by Camilla Ha, Dame Darcy, Dewanatron, Lauren Weinstein, Jared Whitham, Patrick Smith, Alyssa Taylor Wendt and Jenny Gonzalez-Blitz. It featured a live recording project from LYDSOD each night, and performances by many friends of the band, including Autodrone, Laura Ortman, The Clean's Hamish Kilgour, Martin Bisi, Joe McGinty's Circuit Parade, Gelatine and others. The installation was described in articles by Vice Magazine and The New York Times, and kept a website.
