= Moby Presents: Alien Sex Party =

2001 film by Paul Yates

- Directed by: Paul Yates
- Written by: Jonee Eisen; Paul Yates (writing as Berlin Frankfurt Oberhausen)
- Produced by: Next in Line Productions: Moby; Paul Yates; Jonee Eisen; Alexander Berberich
- Starring: Adam Sarner; Joe Smith; Tina Carlucci; Dean Haspiel; Christian Urich; Dyanna Lauren
- Cinematography: Paul Yates
- Edited by: Caleb Oglesby
- Music by: The Happiest Guys in the World, Moby, The Zambonis
- Distributed by: Independent theatrical distribution (14 cities U.S.); Eclectic DVD Distribution (a USA-based distributor) (video release)
- Release dates: September 19, 2001 (Silver Lake Film Festival); January 2002 (United States)
- Running time: 88 minutes
- Country: United States
- Language: English
- Budget: $200,000

Moby Presents: Alien Sex Party, also called Porno, is a 2001 American independent comedy musical directed by Paul Yates and executive produced by Moby about the goings-on in an adult video store on Christmas Eve. It had its world theatrical premiere at the 2001 Silver Lake Film Festival and was released on DVD (Eclectic DVD) in 2003.

== Plot ==
It's Christmas Eve and the staff of the adult video store, Amazing Video, are settling in for a long night. Not only will there be a crush of last minute shoppers, but porn star Dyanna Lauren is appearing to sign her latest release for her rabid, trench coat-wearing fans. Prudish new owner, Joe (Joe Smith) has recently inherited the store from his much wilder late sister. Joe has also taken over parenting duties for his precocious niece Grace (Grace Creech) who would rather go out on the town than spend Christmas with her puritanical uncle. Helping Joe learn the ropes of porn and teenagers is anything goes assistant Tina (Tina Carlucci). When not helping her overwhelmed boss by demonstrating proper use of a strap-on, Tina needles her ex-boyfriend Adam (Adam Sarner) with tales of her sexual conquests, which include family members and a curious pooch. Adam secretly hopes for a chance to talk to Grace. Wise guys Dean (Dean Haspiel) and Christian (Christian Urich) work security and pass the time ignoring their job and betting who would perform the more disgusting sex act for a rare comic book. As the night goes on, the gang is confronted by wacky customers including a dildo-craving Rastafarian, a Borscht Belt comedian, a K-Y jelly-eating space alien, the man in black tailing him and his partner, a chicken. Dean and Christian perform the musical number "You Can Have Sex With Anything You Want". Everyone gets involved when a mad bomber learns that the Price is Right girls are better than Viagra. Finally, Dyanna Lauren and Moby lead the porn geeks and employees in a rousing rendition of "Feliz Navidad" before everyone heads to Joe's for tofurkey.

== Cast ==
- Joe Smith as Joe (and Joe's twin brother Harry)
- Tina Carlucci as Tina
- Adam Sarner as Adam
- Dean Haspiel as Dean
- Christian Urich as Christian
- Grace Creech as Grace
- Moby as Dildo Head
- Brian O'Halloran as Clerk
- Toby Amies as Distraught Father
- Dyanna Lauren as Herself

== Cameos ==
Notable cameos include:

- Peter Prescott the drummer from Mission of Burma.
- The Upper Crust
- Fancy from FannyPack
- Steven St. Croix as Santa
- The Pork Guys
- The Zambonis with Peter Katis and The LeeVees Dave Schneider
- Leon Dewan and The Happiest Guys in the World
- This is the first film soundtrack to feature the sounds of a Dewanatron

== Filming ==
The movie was filmed in Super 16 mm and then blown up in 35 mm.

== Controversy ==
During post-production the film received a great deal of media attention when, in response to Moby distancing himself from the movie and Moby's management's statement to Time magazine that he “no longer agrees with the film creatively”, director Paul Yates sold Moby's soul on eBay. They have since put their differences behind them.

== Cultural references ==
The film includes numerous references to the Kevin Smith film Clerks. At one point Adam, Tina and Harry (Joe's twin brother) drive a microcar to Quick Stop. The film goes into a black and white sequence where Tina and Adam purchase candy from a clerk (Brian O'Halloran) who tells Tina about his girlfriend performing fellatio on 37 men.
