= Johnny Blowers =

American drummer

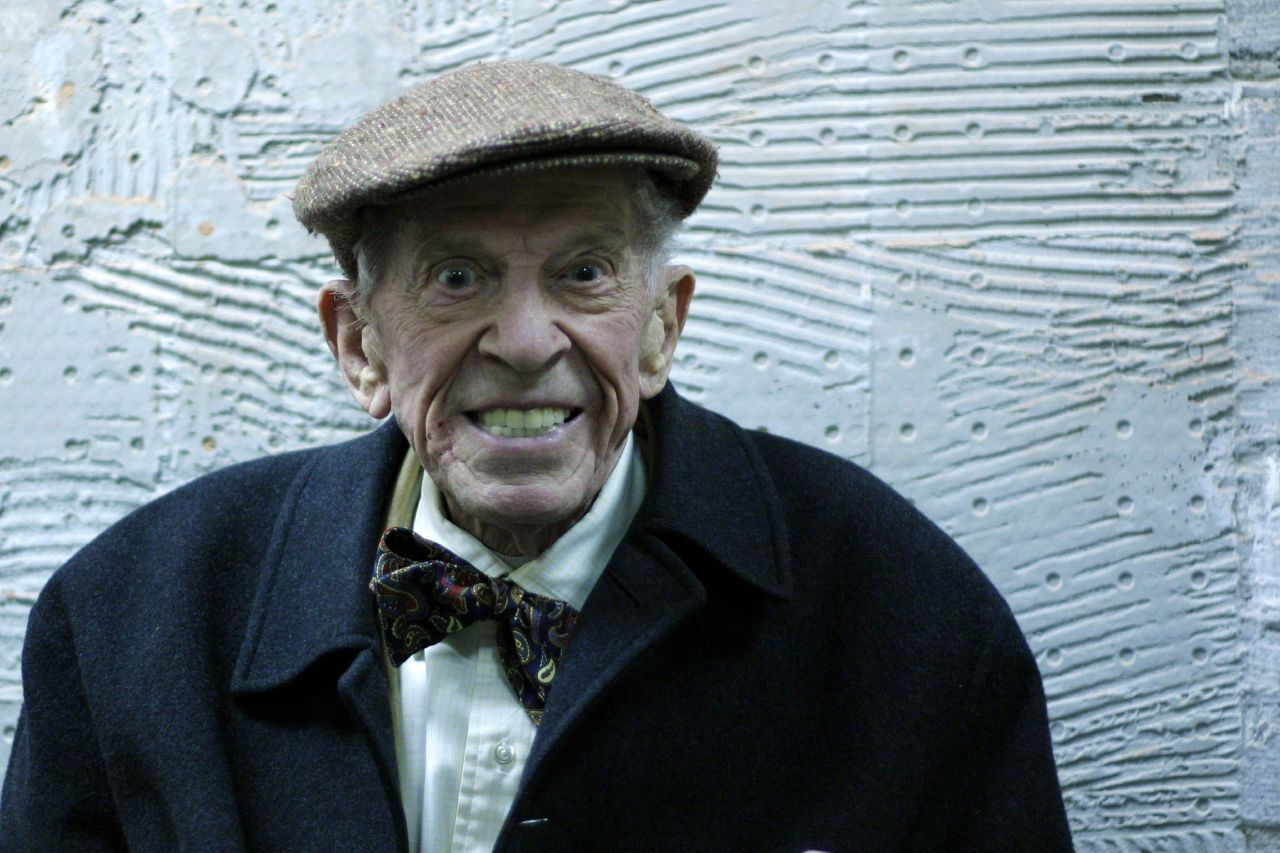
Blowers not long before his death.

John G. Blowers Jr. (April 21, 1911 – July 17, 2006) was an American drummer of the swing era. Born in Spartanburg, South Carolina, United States, Blowers ("Blau-ers") learned to play percussion during his schooldays and began performing with the Bob Pope Band in 1936. Blowers attended college at Oglethorpe College, now Oglethorpe University.

In 1937, he travelled to New York City, where he found employment as a drummer in Greenwich Village. In 1938, he joined Bunny Berigan's band, and in 1942 he began performing with the up-and-coming Frank Sinatra, who asked Blowers to record with him. They performed and recorded together regularly until the 1950s. In 1947, he opened Club Blowers in the Queens district.

In addition to Sinatra, Blowers performed with Louis Armstrong, Perry Como, Bing Crosby, Sidney Bechet, Eddie Fisher, Ella Fitzgerald, Judy Garland, Billie Holiday, and Mel Tormé.

Blowers also performed in the They Might Be Giants video, "They'll Need a Crane" from the album, Lincoln.

== Bibliography ==
- Warren W. Vaché (1997). Back Beats and Rim Shots: The Johnny Blowers Story. Scarecrow Press. ISBN 978-0-8108-3162-9.
- Hentoff, Nat (May 1, 2002). "Johnny Blowers: Riding the Rhythm Wave at 91". JazzTimes.
- Franklin, Benjamin V (2016). An Encyclopedia of South Carolina Jazz and Blues Musicians. University of South Carolina Press. ISBN 9781611176223.
