= Amara, Romania =

Amara
- Town
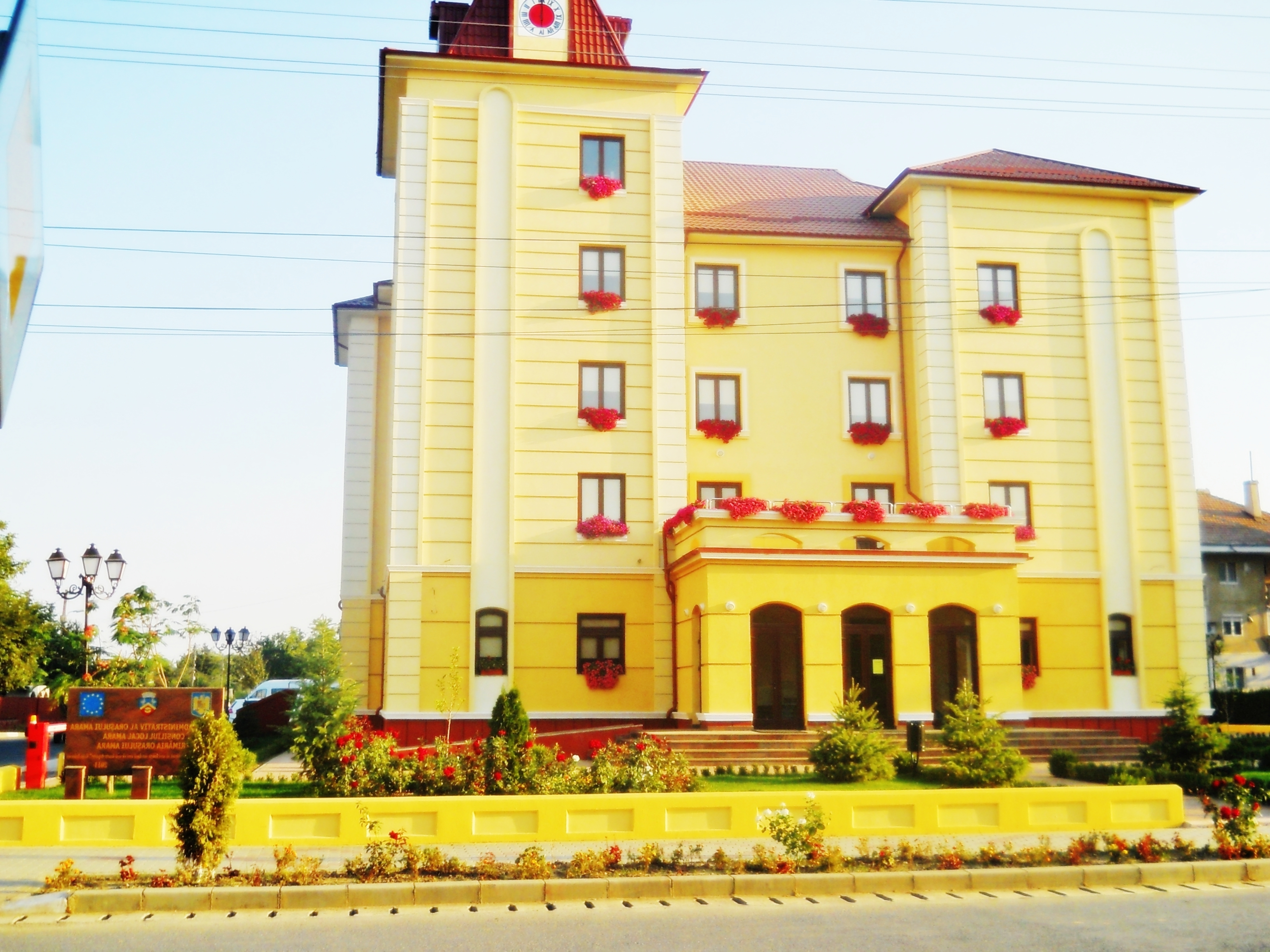

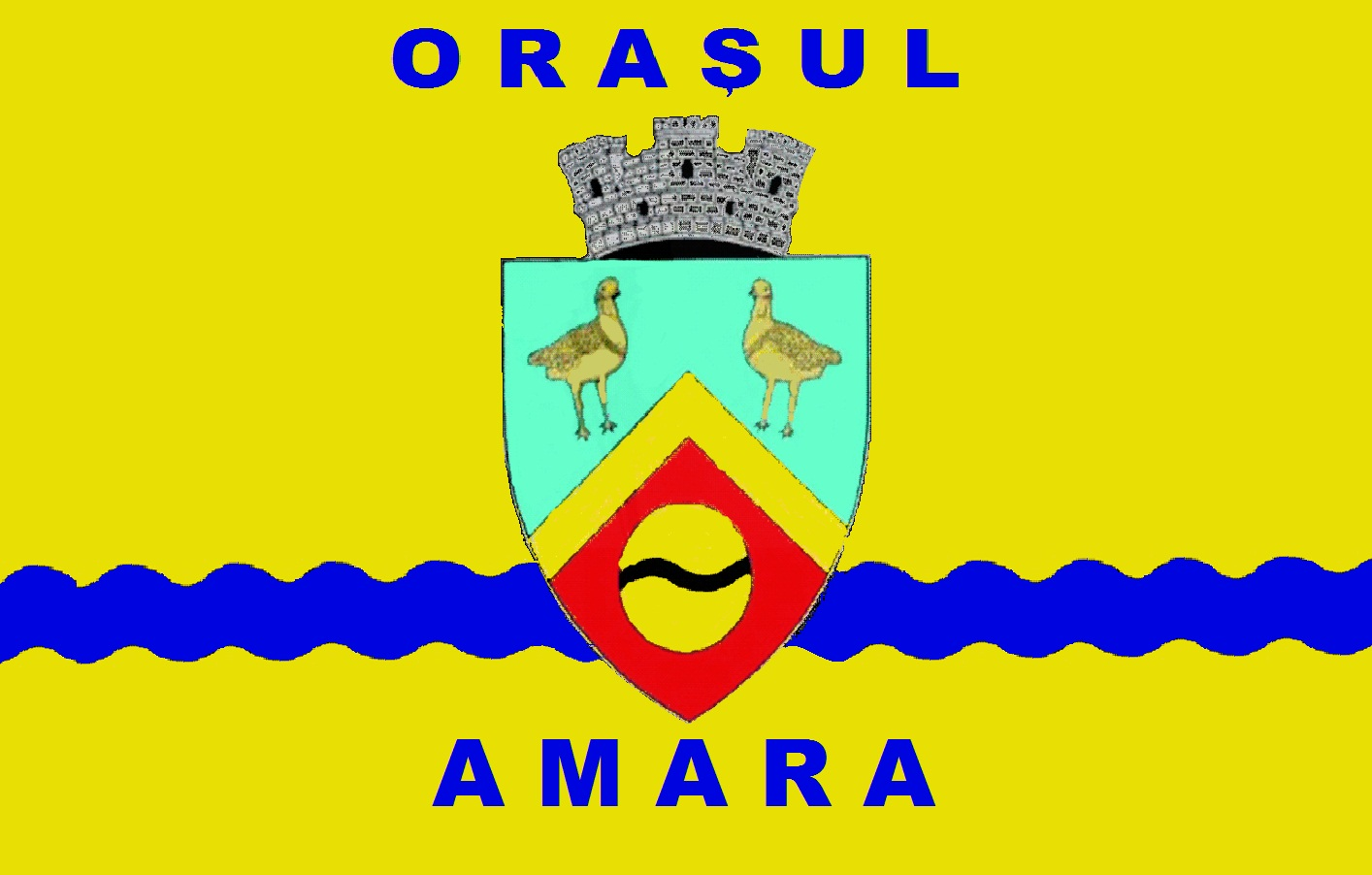
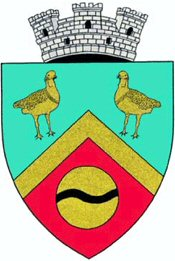
- Flag Coat of arms

- Location in Ialomița County

- Location in Romania
- Coordinates: 44°37′12″N 27°19′12″E
- Country: Romania
- County: Ialomița

Government
  - Mayor (2024–2028): Ionuț-Valentin Moraru (PSD)
- Area: 70.34 km^{2} (27.16 sq mi)
- Elevation: 33 m (108 ft)
- Population (2021-12-01): 6,805
  - Density: 96.74/km^{2} (250.6/sq mi)
- Time zone: UTC+02:00 (EET)
  - Summer (DST): UTC+03:00 (EEST)
- Postal code: 927020
- Area code: (+40) 02 43
- Vehicle reg.: IL
- Website: primaria-amara.ro

Amara is a town in Ialomița County, Muntenia, Romania. It is located in Bărăgan on the shores of Lake Amara, at 7 kilometres (4.3 miles) north of the county capital, Slobozia. Amara was elevated to town status in 2004.

== Demographics ==
Historical population
Year	Pop.	±%
2002	7,627	—
2011	7,345	−3.7%
2021	6,805	−7.4%
Source: Census data

At the 2011 census, Amara had a total of 7,080 residents, 3507 males and 3573 females. Ten years later, at the 2021 census, the total population had dropped to 6,805.

== Natives ==
- Tudorița Chidu (born 1967), middle-distance runner
