= List of experimental bands =

A list of notable bands that are considered to be experimental rock or any experimental genre.

== # ==
- 1 Mile North
- 120 Days

== A ==
- AMM (group)
- Acid Mother's Gong
- Adam Forkner
- Aidan Baker
- Air Liquide (band)
- Alarm Will Sound
- Alex Machacek
- Animal Collective
- Anja Garbarek
- Anthony Moore
- Antipop Consortium
- Apache Beat
- Apse
- Armen Nalbandian
- Autobody
- Autopsia
- Avey Tare & Kría Brekkan

== B ==
- Battles (band)
- Beach House
- Beaten by Them
- Beck
- Benevento/Russo Duo
- Birchville Cat Motel
- Björk
- The Black Angels
- Black Dice
- Black Flag
- Black Moth Super Rainbow
- Blonde Redhead
- Blood Axis
- Boards of Canada
- Bowery Electric
- David Bowie
- Brand New
- Broken Social Scene
- Buck 65
- Butthole Surfers

== C ==
- Captain Beefheart
- Cardiacs
- CEvin Key
- CLOUDDEAD
- Capitol K
- Caroline K
- Caspian
- The Chariot (band)
- Charming Hostess
- Chevron
- Chrome Hoof
- Cindytalk
- Circa Survive
- Circle Takes the Square
- Cloud Cult
- Cluster (band)
- Coil
- Colleen
- Crime in Choir
- Crystal Castles (band)
- Current 93
- Cyclobe

== D ==
- Daedelus
- Death Grips

== E ==
- Experimental Sonic Machines (solo)
- Emerald Suspension
