= Lauren Weinstein (cartoonist) =

American cartoonist

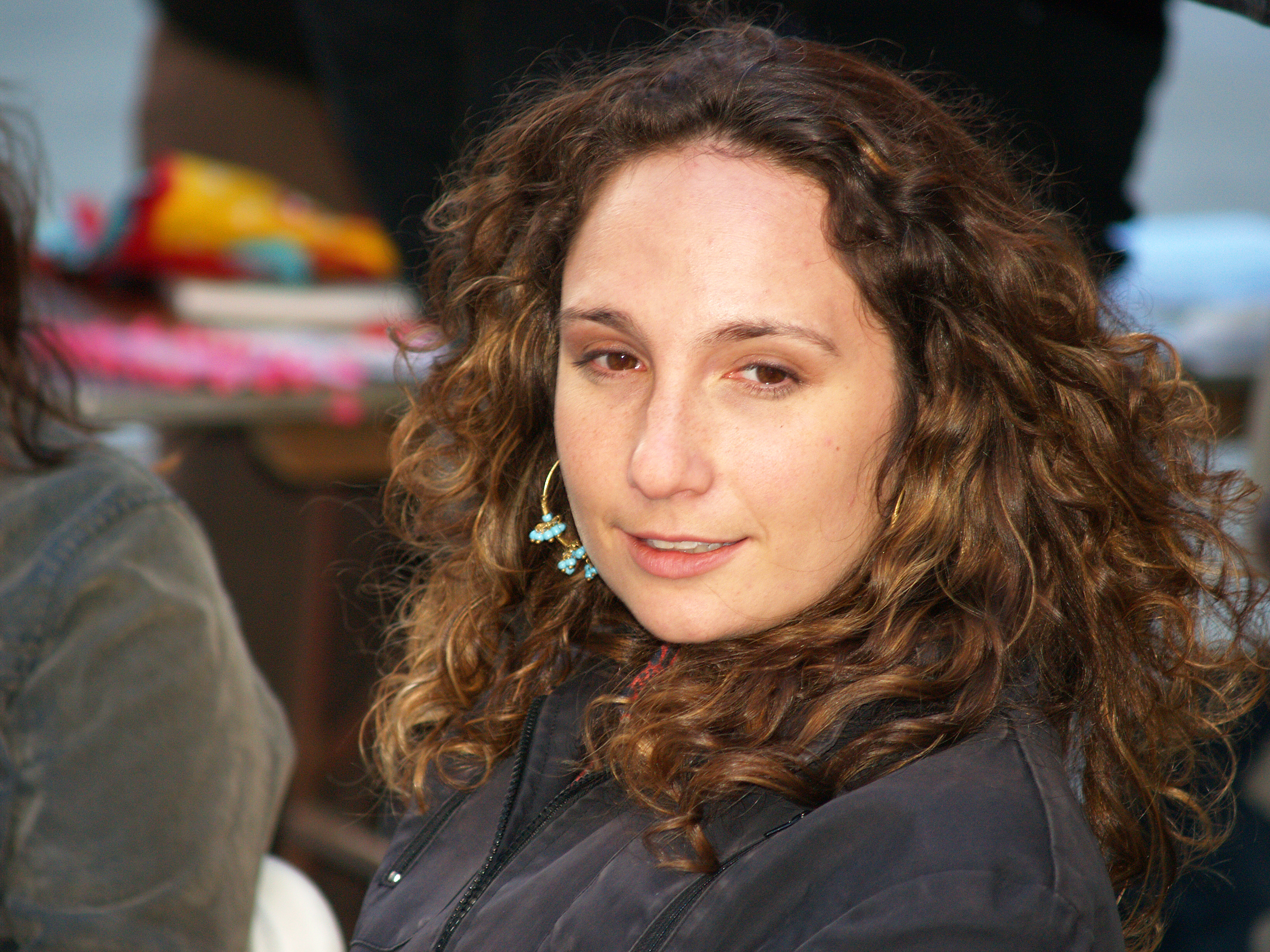
- Weinstein in 2007
- Born: 1975 (age 50–51) Brookline, Massachusetts, U.S.
- Area: Cartoonist
- Notable works: Inside Vineyland; Girl Stories; The Goddess of War
- Awards: Xeric Award, 2003

Lauren Weinstein (born 1975) is an American comic book artist and illustrator. Her first comics appeared as syndicated strips in the Seattle Stranger and Gurl.com, a website aimed at teenagers.

Weinstein was one of a number of artists who graduated from Washington University in St. Louis and moved to New York City in the late 1990s, among them Patrick Smith of Vector Park and Dan Nadel of The Ganzfeld.

Her first solo comic, the Xeric award-winning Inside Vineyland, was published in 2003. Her collection Girl Stories, which originated as a series of short webcomics, was published by Henry Holt in 2006. Her work has appeared in The Best American Comics: An Anthology of Graphic Fiction, Kramers Ergot, and The Graphic Canon. In 2015 her five-part webcomic, Carriers, about dealing with the discovery that she and her husband are carriers of the gene that causes cystic fibrosis, won a Gold Medal from The Society of Illustrators. She is Jewish.

Weinstein is also the lead singer of the metaphysical rock band/arts collective Flaming Fire, and has released three albums: Get Old and Die with Flaming Fire in 2001, Songs from the Shining Temple in 2003, and When the High Bell Rings in 2007.

== Bibliography ==
- Inside Vineyland (Alternative Comics, 2003)
- Girl Stories (Henry Holt, 2006)
- The Goddess of War (Picturebox, 2008)
- M0ther's Walk (Youth in Decline, 2018)
