= Ana Ng =

- Cover art of Australian 7-inch vinyl single

Single by They Might Be Giants

from the album Lincoln
- B-side: "Snowball in Hell"; "Nightgown of the Sullen Moon"
- Released: 1988
- Recorded: 1988
- Genre: Geek rock
- Length: 3:23
- Label: Bar/None / Restless (U.S.); One Little Independent Records (UK); Liberation (AU); Elektra / WEA (EU)
- Songwriters: John Flansburgh, John Linnell
- Producer: Bill Krauss

They Might Be Giants singles chronology
"(She Was A) Hotel Detective" (1988)	"Ana Ng" (1988)	"They'll Need a Crane" (1989)

Music video
- "Ana Ng" on YouTube

"Ana Ng" (/ɛŋ/ ENG) is a song by American alternative rock duo They Might Be Giants. It was released as the lead single from the band's 1988 album Lincoln. Although the song was their first United States chart appearance, hitting number 11 on the U.S. Modern Rock chart, the single was never officially released in the U.S. It was only released for promotional purposes in the U.S., and it saw official releases in 1989 in the United Kingdom (as a maxi-single), Australia, and later, in 1991, in Europe.

== Background ==
The title of the track came from an experience that band members John Flansburgh and John Linnell (the Johns) had when they found a huge number of Ng listings in the New York City phone book.

Linnell: "I think I was collecting possible song ideas and, for some reason, I ended up looking in the phone book, and there were about four pages of this name that contains no vowels, Ng. I was fascinated because it's a name I didn't know about before, and it was filling up a large chunk of the Manhattan white pages. I called up some of the numbers kind of experimentally to find out how it was pronounced, and I got the phone machine of a Dr. Ng and I was kind of relieved. The message said, 'Dr. Ng is not in,' and I had my material." (Pitchfork Magazine, 1996)

Ng is a common Cantonese family name; in Cantonese, it is pronounced [ŋ̍], like the last sound in the English word song.

Linnell: "The other inspiration for [Ana Ng] was a Pogo comic strip. [...] Some of the characters are digging a hole. They decide they're going to dig to China, but one of the smarter characters pulls this huge revolver out of a drawer and shoots a hole "in the desktop globe." Then they look at the other side and the hole is in the Indian Ocean. (Pitchfork Magazine, 1996).

The song, or at least part of it, is set against the backdrop of the 1964 New York World's Fair, which John Linnell and John Flansburgh both separately attended as children. It includes references to "It's a Small World" and the DuPont pavilion, both attractions at the fair.

The line "I don't want the world / I just want your half" is said by Lisa Klapp, a friend of the Johns, and recorded through a telephone.

== Music video ==
A music video for the song was shot at the Ward's Island Fireman's Training Center, and was directed by Adam Bernstein. The song makes mention of a "foreign nation" while a map of Romania (specifically the cities of Bragadiru and Slobozia) is shown.

In 2006, a Pitchfork Media staff review of "100 Awesome Music Videos" included "Ana Ng" on the list. The review praised the video's simplicity, stating that it "matches They Might Be Giants' weird lyrics with equally weird visuals that eschew literality in favor of strange juxtapositions of Cold War ephemera that subtly shade the song with new meanings." It also commented on the lack of special effects: "[T]he clip is just two guys, a camera, and a cool set. And that's all you need."

== Reception ==
The song has been well received by numerous critics. Longtime music critic Robert Christgau called it "a beyond-perfect tour de force about a Vietnamese [sic] woman they never got to meet." In a review for Lincoln on AllMusic, Stephen Thomas Erlewine described "Ana Ng" as a standout song having "irresistible pop hooks". Also for AllMusic, critic Steve Huey reviewed the individual song at length, naming it "a masterpiece of pop absurdism." He cited its "typically playful, seemingly free-associative" lyrics, noting that the syntax is "elongated and convoluted, as one prepositional phrase after another gets tacked on; it's a subtle expression of the group's sense of humor".

== Other uses ==
- "Ana Ng" has been covered by the rock band Self on the album Hello Radio: The Songs of They Might Be Giants.
- The song was featured during the 2008 Jim Carrey comedy film Yes Man.
- The song played in the first episode of the 1991 sitcom Clarissa Explains It All while Clarissa proclaimed her affinity for John Linnell.
- The song was covered by Star Fucking Hipsters on their 2011 album From the Dumpster to the Grave.
- "Ana Ng" is referenced and interpolated in the Car Seat Headrest song "Cute Thing".

== Track listing ==
All tracks by They Might Be Giants.

12" maxi-single

1. "Ana Ng" – 3:23
2. "Nightgown of the Sullen Moon" – 1:59
3. "It's Not My Birthday" – 1:52
4. "Lie Still, Little Bottle" – 2:06

UK 7" release

1. "Ana Ng" – 3:23
2. "Nightgown of the Sullen Moon" – 1:59

Australian 7" release

1. "Ana Ng" – 3:23
2. "Snowball in Hell" – 2:31

1991 European release

This release's cover art was the same photograph as that used for the rarities compilation, Miscellaneous T.

1. "Ana Ng" – 3:23
2. "They'll Need a Crane" – 2:33
3. "(She Was A) Hotel Detective" (single mix) – 2:20
4. "Don't Let's Start" (single mix) – 2:35

== Personnel ==
- John Flansburgh – electric guitar
- John Linnell – lead and backing vocals, accordion, autoharp

== Charts ==
Chart (1988)	Peak position
US Alternative Airplay (Billboard)	11
