= Lincoln (album) =

Studio album by They Might Be Giants
- Released: September 25, 1988
- Recorded: October 1987–June 1988
- Studios: Dubway, New York City
- Genres: Alternative rock; art rock; geek rock
- Length: 39:32
- Labels: Bar/None; Restless
- Producer: Bill Krauss

They Might Be Giants chronology
They Might Be Giants (1986)	Lincoln (1988)	Flood (1990)

Singles from Lincoln
- 1. "Ana Ng" Released: 1988; 2. "They'll Need a Crane" Released: February 10, 1989; 3. "Purple Toupee" Released: July 1989

Lincoln is the second studio album by American alternative rock band They Might Be Giants. It was released by Bar/None in 1988. The album is named after John Linnell and John Flansburgh's boyhood home of Lincoln, Massachusetts. The album produced three singles: "Ana Ng", "They'll Need a Crane", and "Purple Toupee". It is included on Then: The Earlier Years in its entirety.

== Composition ==
Lincoln maintains the range of musical styles present on the previous album, They Might Be Giants, and lyrically attempts to merge word play into narrative songs. Lyrical themes are broadened with the inclusion of songs detailing troubled romantic relationships ("Ana Ng", "They'll Need a Crane", "I've Got a Match"), and songs that verge on social or political satire ("Purple Toupee", "Kiss Me, Son of God"), whereas musically, the album explores a number of genres. For example, songs such as "Cowtown" and "Mr. Me" incorporate elements of sea shanties, while "Lie Still, Little Bottle" suggests a jazz influence.

Like previous releases, Lincoln does not utilize a full band arrangement. Instead, bass and drum tracks are entirely synthetic or sampled, with the exception of live drums on "Lie Still, Little Bottle". The drum tracks on the album were produced with an Alesis HR-16 drum machine. The album featured The Ordinaires, a nonet which was also signed to the Bar/None label, providing the arrangement for "Kiss Me, Son of God".

== Release and commercial performance ==
As of 1999, the album had sold more than 200,000 copies, double the amount of the previous album.

== Packaging and artwork ==
The cover art depicts a shrine built by Brian Dewan and photographed by Carol Kitman. Two slightly different versions of the cover photograph exist: one that was used for domestic releases, and another that was used for all releases outside the United States with the exception of the Australian releases and Italian CD. The two men pictured behind the lecterns in the shrine are John Linnell's great-grandfather, Lewis T. Linnell (left), and Flansburgh's maternal grandfather, Brigadier General Ralph Hospital (right).

The artwork for the album was designed by John Flansburgh. The CD and LP labels feature diagrams of an accordion and accordion case, which were drawn by John Linnell.

== Critical reception ==
Professional ratings
Review scores
Source	Rating
AllMusic	5/5 stars
MusicHound	4.5/5
NME	8/10
Q	4/5 stars
Record Mirror	4/5
Rolling Stone	3/5 stars
The Rolling Stone Album Guide	4/5 stars
Select	4/5
Spin Alternative Record Guide	7/10
The Village Voice	B+

Lincoln received generally positive reviews. David Kissinger of Rolling Stone called the album "every bit as eccentric as its predecessor, and even more eclectic", though this was supplemented with the disclaimer that "[a]t times this penchant for the bizarre leads them into pointlessly sophomoric zaniness". Robert Christgau of The Village Voice described the band as "actively annoying even if intelligence is all you ask of your art-pop" and called the album's hooks "cleverness for cleverness's sake", nonetheless conceding that "damned clever they are." The album placed at number 78 on Pitchfork's 100 Best Albums of the 1980s.

The album peaked at number 89 on the Billboard Top Pop Albums chart in 1989, spending 19 weeks on that chart. Its success led to They Might Be Giants' signing to the major label Elektra Records in 1990. Lincoln also generated the band's first charting single, "Ana Ng", which peaked at number 11 on the Billboard Modern Rock Tracks chart. The single, which was only released promotionally in the United States, also received positive attention. Christgau praised it as "a beyond-perfect tour de force about a Vietnamese woman they never got to meet". The other singles from the album, "They'll Need a Crane" and "Purple Toupee", failed to chart, though both songs and the track "Kiss Me, Son of God" received praise from Stewart Mason of Allmusic.

In his review of Lincoln, Robert Christgau cited "Purple Toupee" as a potential highlight from the album's A-side, though not as strong as the lead single "Ana Ng". He describes the song as "antiboomer". The track was also designated as an Allmusic "pick". Writing for Allmusic, Stewart Mason lauds the song's "infectious tune" and adds that the chorus is "among the duo's most endearing and memorable". Like Christgau, Mason speculates that it carries a baby-boomer theme from the perspective of a confused child of the 1960s. In an Allmusic review of the full album, Stephen Thomas Erlewine also names "Purple Toupee" one of the album's strong "pop hooks".

== Track listing ==
All tracks are written by They Might Be Giants.

Side one
No.	Title	Lead vocals	Length
1.	"Ana Ng"	John Linnell	3:23
2.	"Cowtown"	John Flansburgh / Linnell	2:21
3.	"Lie Still, Little Bottle"	Flansburgh	2:06
4.	"Purple Toupee"	Linnell	2:40
5.	"Cage & Aquarium"	Flansburgh	1:10
6.	"Where Your Eyes Don't Go"	Linnell	3:06
7.	"Piece of Dirt"	Flansburgh	2:00
8.	"Mr. Me"	Linnell	1:52
9.	"Pencil Rain"	Linnell	2:42

Side two
No.	Title	Lead vocals	Length
10.	"The World's Address"	Flansburgh	2:24
11.	"I've Got a Match"	Linnell	2:36
12.	"Santa's Beard"	Flansburgh	1:55
13.	"You'll Miss Me"	Flansburgh	1:53
14.	"They'll Need a Crane"	Linnell	2:33
15.	"Shoehorn with Teeth"	Flansburgh / Linnell	1:13
16.	"Stand on Your Own Head"	Linnell	1:16
17.	"Snowball in Hell"	Flansburgh	2:31
18.	"Kiss Me, Son of God"	Linnell	1:54
Total length:			39:32

=== 2013 Australian bonus tracks ===
No.	Title	Length
19.	"Hello Radio"	0:55
20.	"It's Not My Birthday"	1:52
21.	"I'll Sink Manhattan"	2:32
22.	"Nightgown of the Sullen Moon"	1:59
23.	"World's Address" (Joshua Fried remix)	5:42
24.	"Hey, Mr. DJ, I Thought You Said We Had a Deal"	3:48
25.	"The Lady Is a Tramp" (Rodgers and Hart)	1:20
26.	"Birds Fly"	1:25
27.	"Kitten Intro"	1:43
28.	"Weep Day"	1:50
29.	"The Big Big Whoredom"	1:39
30.	"I'm Getting Sentimental Over You" (Bassman and Washington)	1:59
31.	"Become a Robot"	1:18
32.	"Which Describes How You're Feeling"	1:24
33.	"Swing Is a Word"	0:53
34.	"Doris Cunningham"	0:12
35.	"Counterfeit Fake"	0:39
36.	"Schoolchildren Singing 'Particle Man'"	2:05

== Personnel ==
=== They Might Be Giants ===
- John Flansburgh – lead vocals (2, 3, 5, 7, 10, 12, 13, 15, 17), electric guitar (1, 2, 4–6, 8–12, 14, 16), trumpet (3, 13), backing vocals (4, 5, 7, 8, 13, 14, 18), acoustic guitar (6, 7, 9, 14, 17), melodica (17)
- John Linnell – lead vocals (1, 2, 4, 6, 8, 9, 11, 14–16, 18), backing vocals (1, 5, 9, 10, 11, 12, 16, 17), accordion (1, 4, 7, 8, 11, 15–17), autoharp (1, 9), clarinet (2), keyboard (2, 6, 9–14, 16–18), baritone saxophone (3, 15), bass saxophone (5, 10, 13), bass harmonica (7), tenor saxophone (15), banjo (16)

=== Additional musicians ===
- Lisa Klapp – bridge monologue (1)
- Kenneth Nolan – drums (3)
- Unknown – glockenspiel (15)
- The Ordinaires – arrangement (18)

=== Production ===
- Brian Dewan – cover art
- Al Houghton – engineer
- Carol Kitman – cover photography
- Bill Krauss – producer

== Charts ==
Chart performance for Lincoln
Chart (1989)	Peak position
Australian Albums (ARIA)	116
Billboard 200	89
