= Nervous Young Inhumans =

2018 single by Car Seat Headrest

Single by Car Seat Headrest

from the album Twin Fantasy (Face to Face)
- Released: January 9, 2018
- Genre: Indie rock; power pop
- Length: 5:25; 3:08 (edit)
- Label: Matador
- Songwriter: Will Toledo
- Producer: Toledo

Car Seat Headrest singles chronology
"Beach Life-in-Death" (2017)	"Nervous Young Inhumans" (2018)	"Cute Thing" (2018)

Music video
- "Nervous Young Inhumans" on YouTube

"Nervous Young Inhumans"

Song by Car Seat Headrest

from the album Twin Fantasy
- Released: November 2, 2011
- Genre: Indie rock; lo-fi; power pop
- Length: 4:14
- Label: Self-released
- Songwriter: Toledo
- Producer: Toledo

"Nervous Young Inhumans" is a song written by American indie rock musician Will Toledo. It was originally released independently on Twin Fantasy (2011), his sixth album under his Car Seat Headrest alias. The song would go on to receive a full band re-recording with new lyrics, and be released as the second single in promotion of the band's twelfth studio album Twin Fantasy (Face to Face). The re-recording was released alongside a music video, with cover artwork provided by Hojin Stella Yung.

== Background ==
"Nervous Young Inhumans" was the final track written and recorded for Twin Fantasy, with Toledo originally sharing the song on Tumblr in October 2011. Both versions of the song feature a spoken word outro performed over an instrumental jam, with the original 2011 version featuring Toledo explaining his use of the term "galvanistic" in the chorus, and drawing allusions to Mary Shelley's Frankenstein. Steven Hyden of Uproxx would compare this monologue to "a filmmaker embedding his own director’s commentary into the closing credits".

The spoken word outro would be completely re-written for the re-recording, with added references to the "painstar" (the fictional concept of a star that causes immense pain for a split second when touched, originally dreamed by a friend of Toledo and drawn by Cate Wurtz, the subject of the album) which is referenced in the penultimate track on the album, Famous Prophets (Stars).It also references Murry Wilson and a series of nightmares Toledo had after watching the 2017 film, The Evil Within. In a self-published interview with Peyton Thomas, Toledo would describe the updated outro as "much more stream-of-consciousness", comparing it, and the associated jam, to Neil Young's album Hitchhiker. The lyrics referencing "galvanism" in the chorus would also be removed after Toledo realized the adjectival form of galvanism would be "galvanic" instead of "galvanistic".

== Music video ==
A music video was released alongside the single, directed by front man Will Toledo in collaboration with the production company Dos Rios. The video shows a split screen of Toledo singing and dancing along with the track, alongside a brief cameo from the band's percussionist, Andrew Katz.

== Reception ==
=== 2011 version ===
In a review for the 2018 re-recording, Sasha Geffen of Pitchfork expressed some criticisms for the original version, describing the spoken word outro as "deadpanned over a blasé bass line". They would also describe the main guitar riff in the track as "antithetic". Andy Cush of Spin described the track as a "tight and punchy pop song".

=== 2018 version ===
In the same Pitchfork review by Sasha Geffen, they would praise the updated version as being "among the poppiest songs in Toledo’s catalog," noting that the updated guitar work is "a sparkling, robust tone that throws a glam rock sheen on his fevered power-pop." They would ultimately describe the track as "the shyest glam possible, a tortured internal monologue screamed beneath a broken disco ball [...] remembering what it felt like to want to dance with someone long after the party's over".

Andy Cush of Spin described the re-working as being "one of the most immediate things" Toledo has released so far. Hannah Vettese of Record Collector described the track as being one of the most changed and fleshed out on the album when compared to the original. In a review for Twin Fantasy (Face to Face), Collin Brennan of Consequence named "Nervous Young Inhumans" as one of the three essential tracks.

== Personnel ==
=== 2018 version ===
Adapted from Bandcamp.

Car Seat Headrest

- Will Toledo
- Seth Dalby – bass
- Ethan Ives – guitar
- Andrew Katz – drums

Additional musicians

- Adam Stilson – various sounds

Featured performances

- Will Toledo – "the nonbeliever"
- Andrew Katz – "1traitdanger"
- Hojin "Stella" Jung – "the artist"
- Reesa Mallen – "Margot"

Production

- Will Toledo – production, mixing
- Adam Stilson – engineering, mixing
- Jason Ward – mastering

== Charts ==
Weekly chart performance for "Nervous Young Inhumans"
Chart (2018)	Peak position
Mexico Ingles Airplay (Billboard)	44
