= They'll Need a Crane =

1989 single by They Might Be Giants

Single by They Might Be Giants

from the album Lincoln
- Released: February 10, 1989
- Genre: Alternative rock
- Length: 2:33
- Label: Bar/None, Restless
- Songwriters: John Flansburgh, John Linnell
- Producer: Bill Krauss

They Might Be Giants singles chronology
"Ana Ng" (1989)	"They'll Need a Crane" (1989)	"Purple Toupee" (1989)

Music video
- They'll Need a Crane on YouTube

"They'll Need a Crane" is a song by American alternative rock duo They Might Be Giants, released as a single on February 10, 1989. In addition to vinyl and cassette releases, the single was released as a 3-inch CD. "They'll Need a Crane" was the first song the band performed on network television, in 1989 on Late Night with David Letterman.

== Background ==
The song's lyrics focus on the breakup of a dysfunctional relationship. According to AllMusic critic Stewart Mason, the song contrasts a "jaunty, uptempo melody" with "one of the bluntest depictions of divorce in popular music" about a couple (described as "Gal" and "Lad") whose relationship is crumbling. Mason notes that the song uses construction imagery to describe the relationship's degradation.

== Music video ==
A music video for the single was directed by Adam Bernstein, a frequent collaborator of the band during their earlier years. It was filmed at the Bethesda Terrace in Central Park, New York City. The video primarily features the band playing with a group of elderly musicians, most notably jazz drummer Johnny Blowers who worked with Frank Sinatra during the 1940s.

== Track listing ==
No.	Title	Length
1.	"They'll Need A Crane"	2:33
2.	"It's Not My Birthday"	1:52
3.	"I'll Sink Manhattan"	2:32
4.	"Nightgown of The Sullen Moon"	1:59
