= Iara Lee =

Brazilian filmmaker and activist (born 1966)

Iara Lee (born 1966) is a Brazilian film producer, director and activist who works mainly in the Middle East and Africa. Her documentary films include Unite for Bissau (Nô Kumpu Guiné) (2023), From Trash to Treasure: Turning Negatives into Positives (2020), Stalking Chernobyl: Exploration After Apocalypse (2020), Wantoks: Dance of Resilience in Melanesia (2019), Burkinabè Rising: The Art of Resistance in Burkina Faso (2018), Burkinabè Bounty: Agroecology in Burkina Faso (2018), Life Is Waiting: Referendum and Resistance in Western Sahara (2015), K2 and the Invisible Footmen (2015), The Kalasha and the Crescent (2013), The Suffering Grasses (2012), Cultures of Resistance (2010), Beneath the Borqa in Afghanistan (2002), Architettura (1999), Modulations: Cinema for the Ear (1998), Synthetic Pleasures (1995), and An Autumn Wind (1994).

In 2010, Lee was involved in the "Gaza Freedom Flotilla", where nine pro-Palestinian activists were killed by Israeli naval forces and many were injured.

Lee is the founder of the Cultures of Resistance Network Foundation (formerly named the Caipirinha Foundation) and a longtime supporter of Greenpeace International, Amnesty International, Center for Constitutional Rights, Committee to Protect Journalists, and Doctors Without Borders.

== Film career ==
From 1984 to 1989, Lee was the producer of the São Paulo International Film Festival in Brazil. From 1989 to 2003, while based in New York, she ran the mixed-media company Caipirinha Productions to explore the synergy of different artforms (such as film, music, architecture, and poetry). Under that banner, Iara has directed short and feature-length documentaries including Synthetic Pleasures, Modulations, Architettura, and Beneath the Borqa. Synthetic Pleasures, released in 1995, deals with the impact of high technology on mass culture. The multimedia project Modulations, released in 1998, traces the evolution of electronic music. Her next film was Beneath the Borqa, a 2000 short documentary film about the lives of women and children under the Taliban regime in Afghanistan.

In 2010, Lee directed the feature-length documentary film, Cultures of Resistance, which celebrates creative acts of political struggle. The film debuted in its final form late in 2010, after which it screened at many film festivals, including the International Documentary Film Festival Amsterdam, and won numerous awards. Notably, the film was screened at the Beijing International Film Festival in 2011, defying the norms in a country where political resistance is rarely depicted in the media.

Lee's subsequent projects include a short film, The Kalasha and the Crescent (2013), on the ways that the Kalash indigenous people of northern Pakistan are responding to the challenges facing their culture; and a documentary entitled The Suffering Grasses: when elephants fight, it is the grass that suffers, (2012) which explores the Syrian conflict from the perspective of the civilians who have been displaced to refugee camps. The Suffering Grasses came out of footage taken during Lee's participation in a press delegation to Turkish refugee camps housing Syrians in exile.

In 2015, Lee released K2 and the Invisible Footmen (2015), which documents the unsung efforts of the indigenous porters who for decades have facilitated the ascent of the Earth's second-highest mountain. That same year, she released Life Is Waiting: Referendum and Resistance in Western Sahara (2015), a documentary that chronicles the everyday violence of life under occupation in Western Sahara. In 2018, she released two films about Burkina Faso: Burkinabè Rising: The Art of Resistance in Burkina Faso (2018) and Burkinabè Bounty: Agroecology in Burkina Faso (2018). She followed these with Wantoks: Dance of Resilience in Melanesia (2019), a documentary profiling the artists and activists in Melanesia who are fighting for self-determination while trying to defend their homes against the rising sea.

In 2020, she released a full-length documentary entitled Stalking Chernobyl: Exploration After Apocalypse (2020), which examines the underground culture of the Chernobyl Exclusion Zone, three decades after the world's most infamous nuclear disaster. Later that year, she released From Trash to Treasure: Turning Negatives into Positives (2020), which showcases a spirit of reimagination among artists in Lesotho. She also launched a short film series called Dispatches from Malawi, starting with a music video for "Better Must Come," a song by Ishan Cyapital featuring Teebz. "Better Must Come" gives voice to popular dissatisfaction with corruption and denounces government apathy about the urgent problems facing countries like Malawi.

In 2023, she released a documentary entitled Unite for Bissau (Nô Kumpu Guiné): agroecology and feminism in Guinea Bissau, which documents local women in the West African nation of Guinea-Bissau who challenge patriarchy by building institutions that promote self-sufficiency through agroecology.

== Activism ==
In 2008, Lee traveled to Iran and supported a number of cultural exchange projects between that country and the West, with the goal of promoting arts and culture for global solidarity. For example, she helped produce Iranian rapper Hichkas' "Ye Mosht Sarbaz (A Bunch of Soldiers)" music video, which was directed and edited by Fred Khoshtinat.

Lee has also actively supported indigenous and civil society campaigns to prevent the construction of the Belo Monte mega-dam on the Xingu river, a major tributary of the Amazon in Brazil. According to the California-based nonprofit International Rivers, the dam project threatens to displace over 20,000 people, destroy an extensive area of the Brazilian rainforest, and endanger indigenous tribes that depend on the river for their survival. In 2009, Lee released a short film about the dam controversy, Battle for the Xingu, in conjunction with groups such as International Rivers.

In 2020, Lee launched the Cultures of Resistance Awards, aimed at supporting creative activism, artistic expression, and other socially minded-endeavors, particularly in the global South. As of 2024, more than 200 awards have been distributed.

=== Gaza flotilla ===
In 2010, Lee participated in the "Gaza Freedom Flotilla", where nine pro-Palestinian activists were killed by Israeli naval forces and many were injured. Her footage of the event was released in a press conference at the United Nations in June 2010.

== Filmography ==
- Synthetic Pleasures (1995) – feature documentary
- Modulations: Cinema for the Ear (1998) – feature documentary
- Battle for the Xingu (2009) – short film
- Cultures of Resistance (2010) – feature documentary
- The Suffering Grasses (2012) – feature documentary
- The Kalasha and the Crescent (2013) – short film
- Burkinabè Rising: The Art of Resistance in Burkina Faso (2018 – feature documentary
- Burkinabè Bounty: Agroecology in Burkina Faso (2018 – short film
- Wantoks: Dance of Resilience in Melanesia (2019)
- Stalking Chernobyl: Exploration After Apocalypse (2020)
- From Trash to Treasure: Turning Negatives into Positives (2020)
- Dispatches from Malawi (2020 – short film series
- Unite for Bissau (Nô Kumpu Guiné): agroecology and feminism in Guinea Bissau (2023 – short film
