= Brian Dewan =

Musical artist (born 1963)

- Born: Brian Dewan; June 14, 1963 (age 62)
- Genres: Folk; electronic; chamber music; jazz
- Occupations: Musician, composer, vocalist, instrument builder, illustrator, cartoonist
- Instruments: Electric zither; organ; piano; autoharp; koto; accordion; Dewanatron
- Years active: 1985–present
- Labels: Bar/None, Instinct, Eschatone

Brian Dewan (born June 14, 1963) is an American multi-media artist, who produces music, audio-visual performances, decorative painting, furniture, poetry, filmstrips, illustrations, and musical instruments. He has released three albums of songs and performed extensively in clubs and concert halls as a solo artist and as a member of various ensembles. He lives in Catskill, New York. Brian is the brother of artist Ted Dewan and the cousin of musical instrument builder/musician Leon Dewan.

== Music ==
=== Genre ===
Dewan has a cross-genre approach to music, although he is predominantly known for his folk-tinged vocal stylings and instrumental electronic music, which on a performance level are generally mutually exclusive. His vocal repertoire references folk music, hymns, popular songs from bygone eras (especially topical songs from the 19th and early 20th centuries), and rock music. He also composes original songs reflecting these influences.

These genres permeate his first two full-length albums, Brian Dewan Tells the Story (1993, Bar None Records) and The Operating Theatre (1998, Instinct Records). His songs often contemplate the nature of submission to authority, often in a storytelling manner. His lyrics are by turns humorous, philosophical, and contemplative. His historical song repertoire often betrays a post-modern irony in the re-telling.

=== Live ===
In live performance, Dewan accompanies his singing with a home-built electric zither, outfitted with eight humbucker pickups and 88 strings, sometimes piped through a leslie cabinet or guitar effects pedals. He also plays a variety of other instruments, including autoharp, koto, organ, and accordion. His electronic music, either solo or in collaboration with his cousin, Leon Dewan, tends to be more sprawling and free-form, often evoking the dissonance of early analog electronic music.

=== Bands Worked With ===
Dewan has worked with They Might Be Giants, Sesame Street, Flaming Fire, Jed Davis, The Music Tapes, Loser's Lounge, The Shondes and The Musical Stones of Skiddaw.

He is a member of the Raymond Scott Orchestrette, a group dedicated to reinterpreting Scott's compositions, and appeared on their 2002 album Pushbutton Parfait. He also composes and performs with the Patient Island Singers, a project loosely centered around the topic of Roosevelt Island. He was an original member of the Blue Man Group Tubes house band, for whom he composed musical scores. He later sued the group for authorship claims, and eventually prevailed in court.

=== Musical Work ===
Dewan's 2007 album Words Of Wisdom (Eschatone Records) was the first in a series of folk archival recordings called the Humanitarium Series. Each record in the series will collect a set of song artifacts by theme: temperance, school songs, hymns, folksongs ancient and modern, institutional music, advertisement and persuasion, ditties, jingles, and popular music.

He has also performed a song for the original soundtrack CD for the "Where in the World is Carmen San Diego?" television series, though this track was commissioned for the CD and never used in any other context.

== Visual and multi-media art ==
=== Filmstrips ===
Brian Dewan's series of I Can See filmstrips use the technology of the educational filmstrips from the mid-twentieth century as a point of departure for imaginative personal invention.

Each panel features one of Dewan's fanciful drawings, usually rendered in magic marker or watercolor. The images are accompanied by elaborate soundtracks in which Dewan is heard, adopting a deadpan narrator's voice, and playing various musical instruments to create a different miniature soundtrack for each panel of the filmstrip.

When it is time for the projectionist to advance the strip to the next panel, Dewan's voice is typically heard singing "boop" in close imitation of the noise traditionally used for this purpose. The themes of the strips often seem as though they could have been taken from actual educational strips – Grimm's Fairy Tales, Civic Pride, and a short history of the Organ. Biblical stories have all served as conceits for the filmstrips. The strips tend to take many free-associative liberties and are by turns satirical and surreal, often whimsical and sometimes touching on serious themes. "Before the White Man Came" seems as though it might be about colonialism or racism, but the "White Man" of the filmstrip starts to seem more likely to be a folkloric evil spirit, with a charged and ambiguous relationship to racial stereotypes.

In 2003, Dewan created an installation at the Pierogi 2000 Gallery in Brooklyn which transformed the appearance of the gallery into that of an American classroom from an indeterminate bygone era, perhaps from the 1940s. He presented his filmstrips regularly during the course of the month-long exhibition, to audience members seated in old schooldesks.

=== Shrines ===
Dewan has created a series of what he terms "shrines". They are constructed of wood and other materials, such as light bulbs, clocks, photographs and bottles. The best known shrine is the one appearing on the cover of They Might Be Giants' album Lincoln. The shrines range from about one to six feet tall and often evoke New England church architecture with their lean geometrical spires. While the word "shrine" might connote a site created for devotion to a spiritual entity, Dewan's shrines seem to exist not as a conduit for worship, but as playful aesthetic objects.

Dewan created a number of shrines for New Year's Eve parties and performances, and those shrines often have some sort of illumination which could be turned on at midnight. At least one had a drink-dispenser built into it. The cabinetry he built for his recent series of electronic instruments, created in collaboration with his cousin, Leon Dewan, often continue some of the visual ideas behind the shrines. His New Year's Eve shrine ritual involves completing the shrine only moments before midnight.

=== Dewanatron ===
Brian Dewan currently works with Leon Dewan under the name Dewanatron. Together they have designed and built a series of synthesizers in custom cabinetry, often reminiscent of either New England churches or 1940's school house architecture. The instruments create sounds evocative of the early electronic music. The instruments were exhibited and concertized at the Pierogi 2000 gallery in Brooklyn in December 2005, Pierogi Leipzig in Germany in April 2006 and at "Another Year in LA" gallery as well as the Steve Allen Theater in Los Angeles in August and September 2007.

=== Cover art for albums ===
Dewan has created album art for others, such as the cover of David Byrne's Uh-Oh, They Might Be Giants' Lincoln, Beat Circus' Dreamland, and the interior artwork of In the Aeroplane Over the Sea by Neutral Milk Hotel.

== Discography ==
=== Albums ===
- Tells the Story (Bar/None, 1993)
- The Operating Theatre (Instinct, 2001)
- Dewanatron [with Leon Dewan] (2005)
- Live at the Auk (Obedience School, 2005)
- Irregular Hours, Vol. 1 (Live at Pierogi) [with Leon Dewan, as Dewanatron] (Obedience School, 2006)
- Sleep on It - Electronic Excursions (Obedience School, 2007)
- Words of Wisdom (Eschatone, 2007)
- Semi Automatic [with Leon Dewan, as Dewanatron] (Cuniglius, 2008)
- Ringing At The Speed Of Prayer (Innova, 2009)
- The Greenhorns Presents: Brian Dewan Sings Grange Future: Songs of the Patrons of Husbandry (2014)
- The Hunting of the Snark (Obedience School, 2017)
- Catskill Escapade [with Elizabeth Karp] (2024)

=== EPs ===
- Hello Recording Club EP (March, 1993)
- Hello Recording Club EP (September, 1994)

=== Guest appearances ===
- "The Violin" (w/ Eileen Ivers on violin), Where in the World is Carmen Sandiego? soundtrack
