= Twin Fantasy (Face to Face) =

- The cover is a retraced version of Toledo's original drawing for the original 2011 album.

Studio album by Car Seat Headrest
- Released: February 16, 2018
- Recorded: 2016–17
- Studios: Decade Music (Chicago); Soundhouse (Seattle)
- Genre: Indie rock
- Length: 71:16
- Label: Matador
- Producer: Will Toledo

Car Seat Headrest chronology
| Teens of Denial (2016) | Twin Fantasy (Face to Face) (2018) | Commit Yourself Completely (2019) |

Singles from Twin Fantasy (Face to Face)
- 1. "Beach Life-in-Death" Released: December 13, 2017; 2. "Nervous Young Inhumans" Released: January 9, 2018; 3. "Cute Thing" Released: January 23, 2018; 4. "My Boy (Twin Fantasy)" Released: February 6, 2018

Twin Fantasy (Face to Face) is the eleventh studio album by American indie rock band Car Seat Headrest, released on February 16, 2018 through Matador Records. It is a complete full band studio re-recording and reworking of the band's sixth album, Twin Fantasy, later retitled Twin Fantasy (Mirror to Mirror), originally released by then-solo artist Will Toledo in 2011.

== Background ==
Twin Fantasy began as a solo album recorded by Car Seat Headrest's lead singer/songwriter Will Toledo, and released as a pay-what-you-want download via Bandcamp on November 2, 2011, while Toledo was attending the College of William & Mary. In an interview with CityBeat, Toledo explained that due to his lack of resources, Twin Fantasy was unable to achieve the expansiveness he originally wanted, adding that "It just never seemed like the book was closed on it". When he first met with independent label Matador Records in 2015 before signing, Toledo expressed his intentions to rerecord the album in full, following the release of compilation album Teens of Style (2015) and studio album Teens of Denial (2016).

== Recording and release ==
Recording for Twin Fantasy (Face to Face) began in 2016, with much of the instrumental work being recorded live by the band at Soundhouse in Seattle. Toledo's vocals were recorded separately by engineer Adam Stilson at Decade Music Studios in Chicago. Post production and mixing took place between Decade Music Studios and Will Toledo's apartment, with most effects, stems and final mixes run through the studio's vintage mixing console. "Stop Smoking (We Love You)" was recorded by Toledo in his apartment.

On December 13, 2017, the band released a re-recorded version of "Beach Life-In-Death" digitally without prior announcement. Fans began speculating that the album would be re-recorded and released soon afterwards. On December 27, 2017, an Amazon listing detailing a re-recorded version of Twin Fantasy was found by fans, and subsequently uploaded to the Car Seat Headrest subreddit. This was followed up by a listing on SRCVinyl.com with the date February 16, 2018, which contained an abridged version of the Matador Records press announcement.

On January 9, 2018, Matador officially announced the release of the re-recording, entitled Twin Fantasy (Face to Face), alongside a tour announcement and a music video for the single "Nervous Young Inhumans". The album was released via Matador on February 16. The CD release of the album included both versions of the album, and a lyric booklet with art by Hojin "Stella" Jung.

The original recording, re-titled to Twin Fantasy (Mirror to Mirror), was released on vinyl as a part of Record Store Day on April 21, and was re-released to streaming services on November 2.

== Critical reception ==
Professional ratings
Aggregate scores
| Source | Rating |
|---|---|
| AnyDecentMusic? | 8.1/10 |
| Metacritic | 87/100 |
Review scores
| Source | Rating |
| AllMusic | 4/5 stars |
| The A.V. Club | A |
| Consequence | A− |
| The Guardian | 4/5 stars |
| Mojo | 4/5 stars |
| Pitchfork | 8.6/10 |
| Q | 4/5 stars |
| Record Collector | 5/5 stars |
| Uncut | 8/10 |
| Vice (Expert Witness) | A− |

Twin Fantasy (Face to Face) received positive critical reception from contemporary music critics. On the review aggregate site Metacritic, the album received a score of 87 out of 100 based on 21 reviews, indicating "universal acclaim". Hannah Vettese of Record Collector gave the album a perfect score, calling Toledo's lyrics "exhilarating" and described the album as "no stop-gap, contract filler of a record but rather a perfectionist giving a great album the full workout it deserved." The album received a "Best New Music" certification from Pitchfork, with Mark Richardson commenting that "Toledo pulls off an album with a jarring degree of specificity that touches on feelings familiar to almost anyone who has experienced young desire and heartbreak." In an "Album of the Day" feature for Bandcamp Daily, J. Edward Keyes described Twin Fantasy as "not only the best album in Toledo's catalog, [but] one of the young year's best rock albums, period", concluding that the result of the revisions, "is a blistering rock record of tremendous scope and heft, richly detailed and overflowing with memorable melodies. It is Car Seat Headrest's first masterpiece." Journalist Robert Christgau gave the album an A−, stating that his favorite track was the shortest one, "Stop Smoking".

== Track listing ==
All tracks are written by Will Toledo, except where noted.

| No. | Title | Writer(s) | Length |
|---|---|---|---|
| 1. | "My Boy (Twin Fantasy)" | | 2:52 |
| 2. | "Beach Life-in-Death" ("a cursed song") | | 13:19 |
| 3. | "Stop Smoking (We Love You)" | | 1:29 |
| 4. | "Sober to Death" ("sickening sickening humans") | | 5:04 |
| 5. | "Nervous Young Inhumans" ("a song about art theft") | | 5:25 |
| 6. | "Bodys" ("on a need-to-know basis") | | 6:46 |
| 7. | "Cute Thing" ("Paul we know") | John Linnell, John Flansburgh | 5:39 |
| 8. | "High to Death" ("all summer in a night") | | 7:39 |
| 9. | "Famous Prophets (Stars)" ("a song about Jesus") | | 16:10 |
| 10. | "Twin Fantasy (Those Boys)" | | 6:54 |
| Total length: | | | 1:11:16 |

=== Notes ===
- "Cute Thing" interpolates the They Might Be Giants song "Ana Ng" in its bridge.

== Personnel ==
Adapted from Bandcamp.

Car Seat Headrest

- Will Toledo – vocals, guitar, synthesizer, piano, organ
- Seth Dalby – bass
- Ethan Ives – guitar
- Andrew Katz – drums

Additional musicians

- Adam Stilson – various sounds
- Amanda Schiano di Cola – trumpet (track 9)
- Jeff Walker – trombone (track 9)
- Degnan Smith – acoustic guitars (track 4, "possibly some")

Featured performances

- Will Toledo – "the nonbeliever"
- Andrew Katz – "1traitdanger"
- Hojin "Stella" Jung – "the artist"
- Reesa Mallen – "Margot"

Production

- Will Toledo – production, mixing
- Adam Stilson – engineering, mixing
- Jason Ward – mastering

== Charts ==
| Chart (2018) | Peak position |
|---|---|
| Belgian Albums (Ultratop Flanders) | 43 |
| Belgian Albums (Ultratop Wallonia) | 200 |
| Dutch Albums (Album Top 100) | 88 |
| New Zealand Heatseeker Albums (RMNZ) | 1 |
| Scottish Albums (Official Charts) | 29 |
| Spanish Albums (PROMUSICAE) | 96 |
| UK Albums (Official Charts) | 68 |
| US Billboard 200 | 92 |
| US Independent Albums (Billboard) | 3 |
| US Top Alternative Albums (Billboard) | 5 |
| US Top Rock Albums (Billboard) | 11 |
