= Elena Voicu =

Romanian handball player (born 1990)

Personal information
- Full name: Elena Gabriela Voicu
- Nationality: Romanian
- Born: 28 April 1990 (age 36) Slobozia, Romania
- Height: 1.78 m (5 ft 10 in)

Sport
- Sport: Handball
- Position: Goalkeeper
- Current club: Rapid București
- Number: 16

Senior clubs
- Years: Team
- 2009–2018: Dunărea Brăila
- 2018–2021: Măgura Cisnădie
- 2021–: Rapid București
National team
Years	Team	Apps	(Gls)
2016–	Romania	2	(0)
- Updated on 1 November 2017

Elena Gabriela Voicu (born 28 April 1990) is a Romanian handballer who plays for Rapid București.

== Achievements ==
- Liga Naţională:
  - Winner: 2022
  - Silver Medalist: 2017
  - Bronze Medalist: 2014, 2018
