= Diocese of Slobozia and Călărași =

Facade of the Catedrala Episcopala - Episcopia Sloboziei si Calarasilor

The Diocese of Slobozia and Călărași (Romanian: Episcopia Sloboziei și Călărașilor) is a diocese of the Romanian Orthodox Church. Its see is the Ascension Cathedral in Slobozia and its ecclesiastical territory covers Ialomița and Călărași counties. The diocese forms part of the Metropolis of Muntenia and Dobrudja. It was established in 1993, making it the church's first new diocese since before the onset of the communist regime. There are six archpriests' districts and around 400 priests assigned to 350 churches, of which eleven are historic monuments. The diocese includes nine monasteries and four sketes with around a hundred monks in total, seven almshouses, a high-school level theological seminary in Slobozia and a school for church singers in Călărași.

== Bishops ==
- Nifon Mihăiță (1994-1999)
- Damaschin Coravu (2000-2009)
- Vincențiu Grifoni (2009-)
