= Lake Amara =

Lake in Romania

Lacul Amara
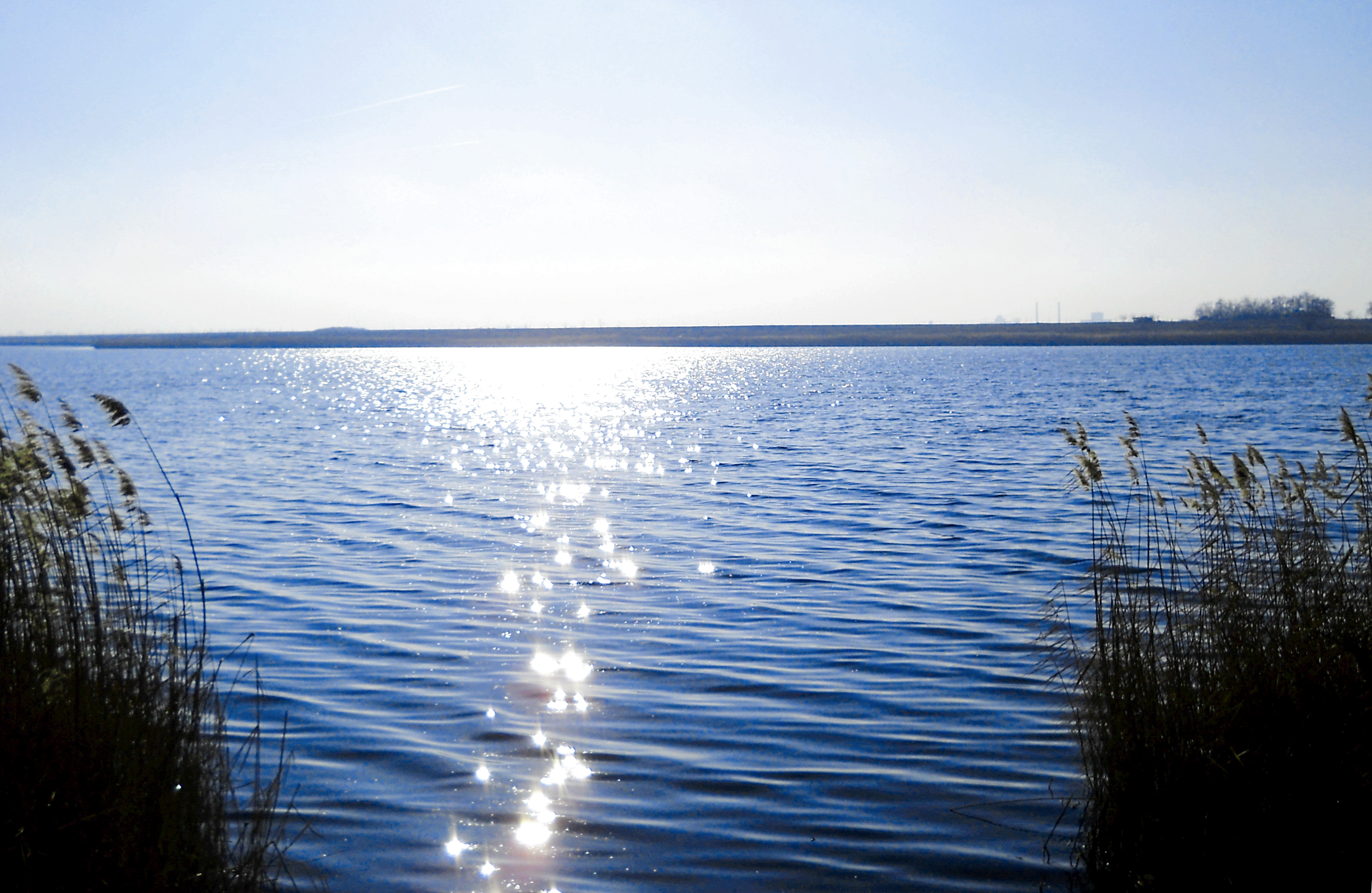

- Location within Romania
- Location: Amara, Romania
- Coordinates: 44.608°N 27.338°E
- Type: fluvial liman
- Basin countries: Romania
- Max. length: 4 km (2.5 mi)
- Max. width: between 200 m (660 ft) and 800 m (2,600 ft)
- Surface area: 1.32 km^{2} (0.51 sq mi)
- Average depth: 1.5 m (4.9 ft)
- Max. depth: 3 m (9.8 ft)
- Water volume: 2.6×10^{6} m^{3} (2,100 acre⋅ft)
- Surface elevation: 30 m (98 ft)

Lake Amara (Romanian: Lacul Amara) is a saltwater fluvial liman lake located on the Slobozia - Buzău road near Amara in Ialomița County, Romania.

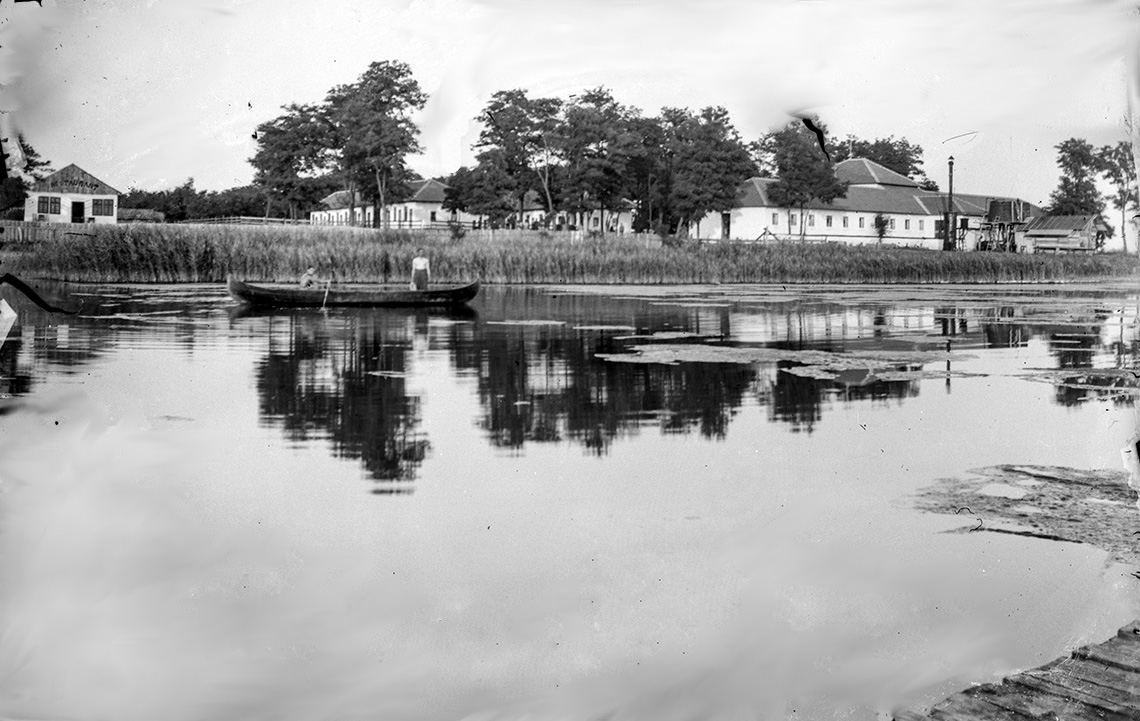
Lake Amara, taken in the 1930s-1940s.

The lake has a surface area of 132 ha (0.51 mi^{2}), a water volume of 2,600,000 m^{3} (0.00062 cu mi), a length of 4 km (2.5 mi) and a width between 200 m (660 ft) and 800 m (2,600 ft) while the maximum depth reaches 3 m (9.8 ft). The lake is situated in a depression having no links to the Ialomița River. Because of the lack of a year-round constant fresh water supply and because of the evaporation process triggered by the dry climate, the concentration of salts in the lake is quite high. The hypertonic water is rich in sulphate salts, bicarbonate, chlorides, iodides, bromides and magnesium salts which led to the formation of a therapeutic mud used to treat different illnesses. The general mineral concentration of the water is around 9.8g/L. The sapropelic mud contains around 40% organic and 41% mineral substances. The mud is recommended to people with affections of the locomotory system, with gynaecologic affections (especially sterility) and dermatosis patients of all kinds. The mud is not recommended to people with cardiovascular diseases, Graves' disease, asthma or infectious diseases.

The Amara Resort located at the shores of the lake has around 2,000 accommodation places in three hotels. At 507 rooms, the Lebăda Hotel is the largest in the resort and one of the largest hotels in the country.
