= Modulations: A History of Electronic Music =

2000 book by Peter Shapiro

- Language: English
- ISBN: 1-891024-06-X

Modulations: A History of Electronic Music: Throbbing Words on Sound is a 2000 book edited by Peter Shapiro. It is a companion piece to the documentary film Modulations: Cinema for the Ear.

The book features Rob Young on the pioneers of electronic music, Simon Reynolds on krautrock, Peter Shapiro on disco & post-punk, Kodwo Eshun on house music, David Toop on hip hop, Mike Rubin on techno music, Chris Sharp on Drum and bass jungle, Tony Marcus on ambient music, Kurt Reighley on downtempo, and Michael Berk on the technology of electronic music.
