= Sfinții Voievozi Monastery =

Romanian Orthodox religious building

Coordinates: 44.5618°N 27.3767°E

- Mănăstirea Sfinții Voievozi
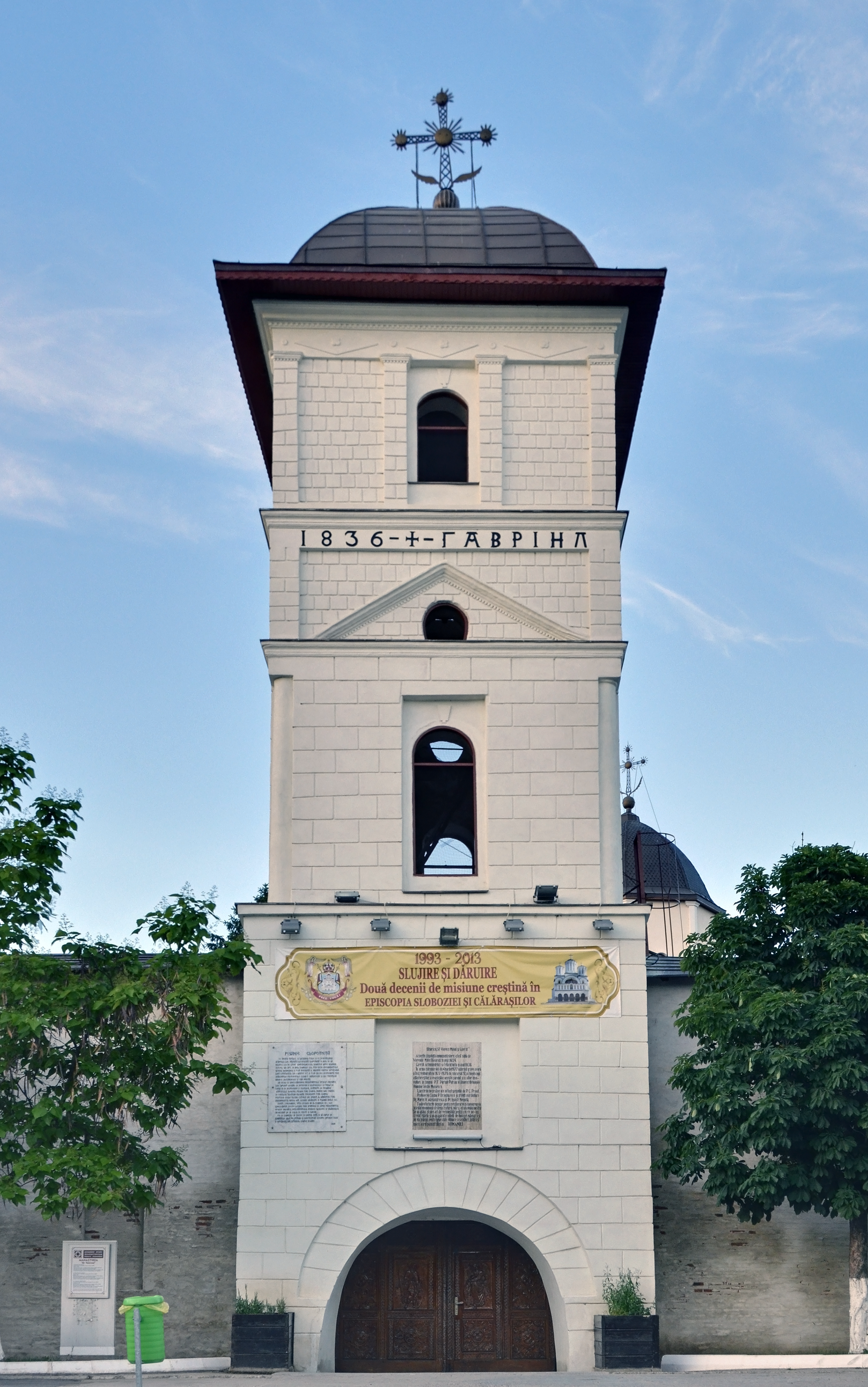
- Bell tower of the monastery

Religion
- Affiliation: Eastern Orthodox
- Year consecrated: 1612; 414 years ago

Location
- Location: Aleea Mănăstirii 1, Slobozia 920073
- Country: Romania
- Interactive map of Sfinții Voievozi Monastery

Architecture
- Founder: Matei Basarab
- Site area: 5,000 square metres (54,000 sq ft)

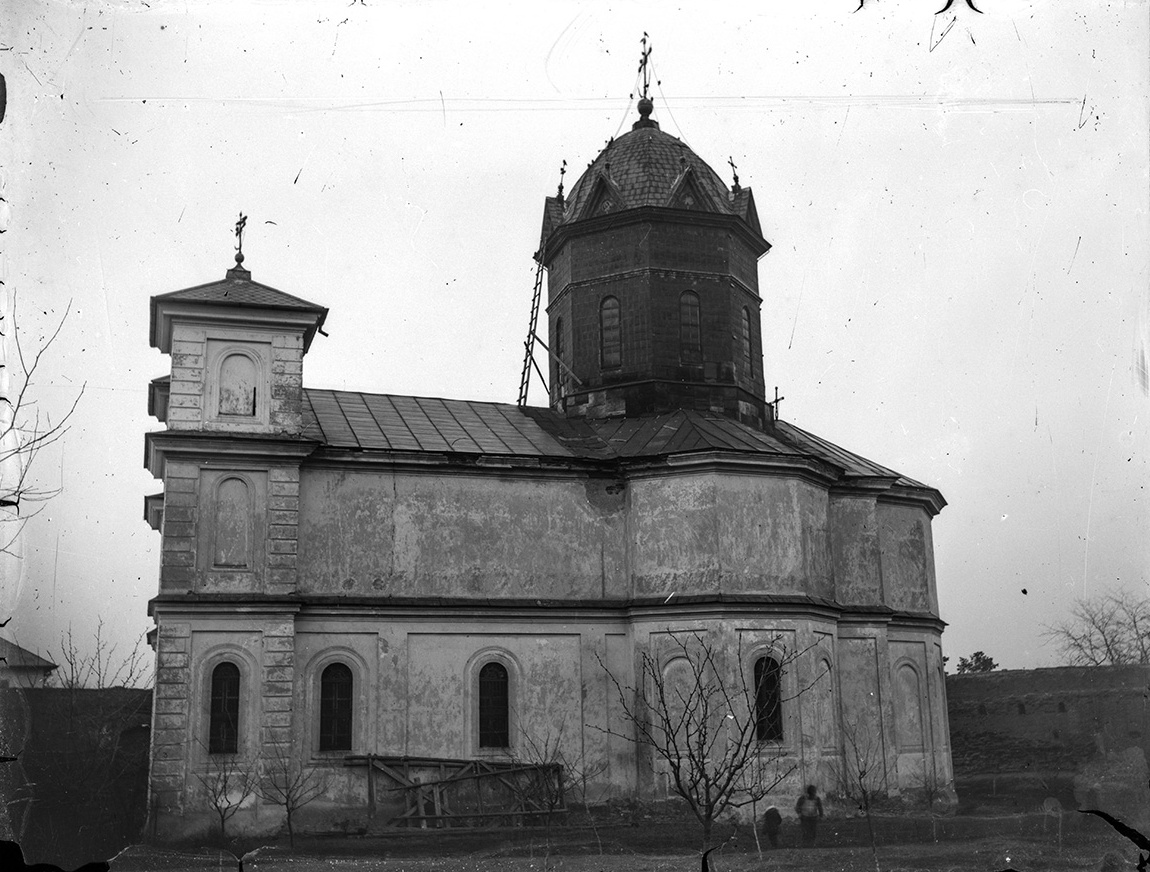
Older view of the monastery

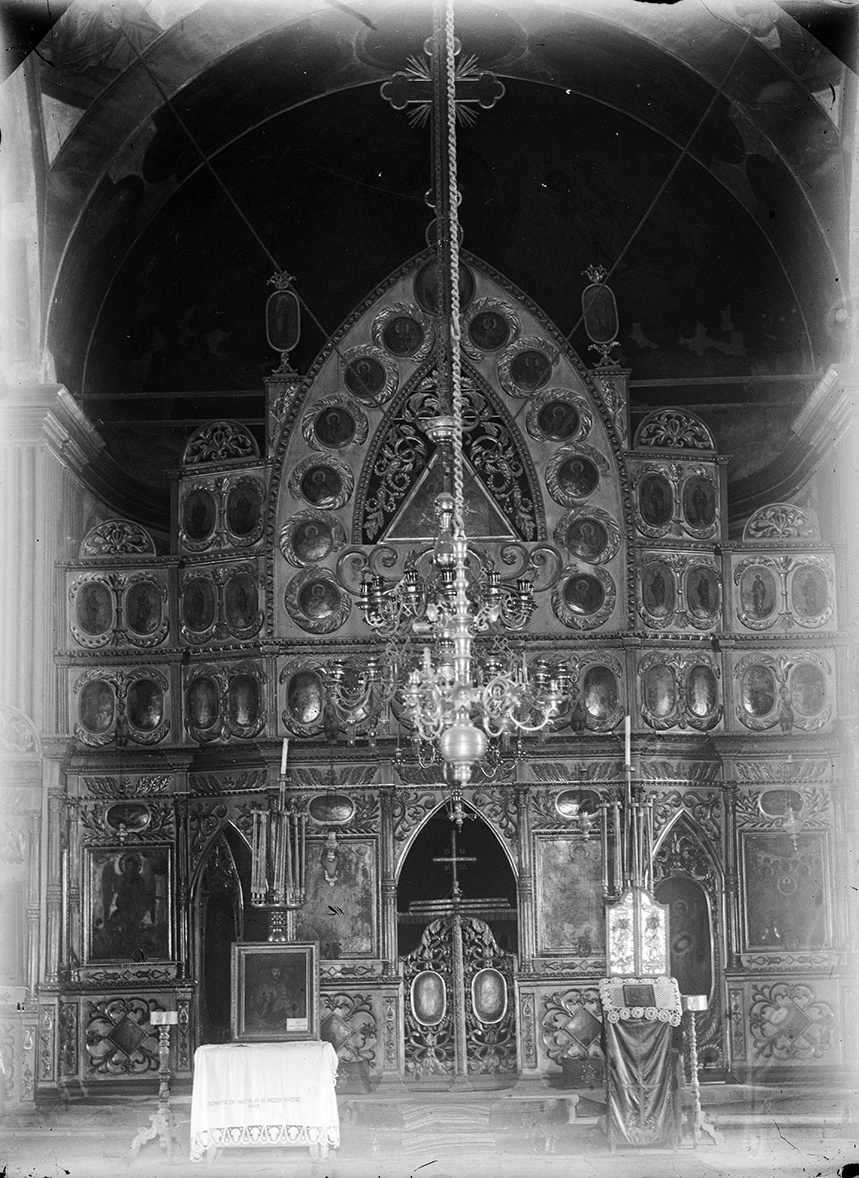
Altar inside the monastery

The Sfinții Voievozi Monastery (Romanian: Mănăstirea Sfinții Voievozi) is a monastery in Slobozia, Ialomița County, Romania. It dates to the 17th century.

== History ==
The monastery is one of biggest in the southeastern portion of the country. It was built by marshal Enache Caragea and Prince Matei Basarab, built on an estate received by the marshal from Iliaș Alexandru, in 1616. The building collapsed in an earthquake in 1627, and was rebuilt by Prince Basarab. In 1636, the consecration of the monastery was headed by the Ecumenical Patriarch of Constantinople along with more than 500 priests, in the presence of the Prince. From the old building were kept a cross, the two icons above the iconostasis and four large icons of Jesus Christ, the Virgin Mary, the Holy Kings and Saint John the Baptist. These icons are still on the iconostasis of the church today.

Until the nineteenth century, the monastery was not in need of repairs or renovation. After the earthquake of 1838, the church and bell tower were quite damaged. During the communist period the monastery was disbanded and the building became a parish church. In February 1994, the Holy Monastery hosted the installation of the first bishop of Sloboziei and Calarasi. The building was renovated and part of the west side of the structure was rebuilt. The monastic settlement was re-founded and the Church of the Holy Princes became an Episcopal cathedral. Dedicated to the Archangels Michael and Gabriel, it is listed as a historic monument by the Culture Ministry.
