= Dyanna Lauren =

American pornographic actress and director (born 1965)

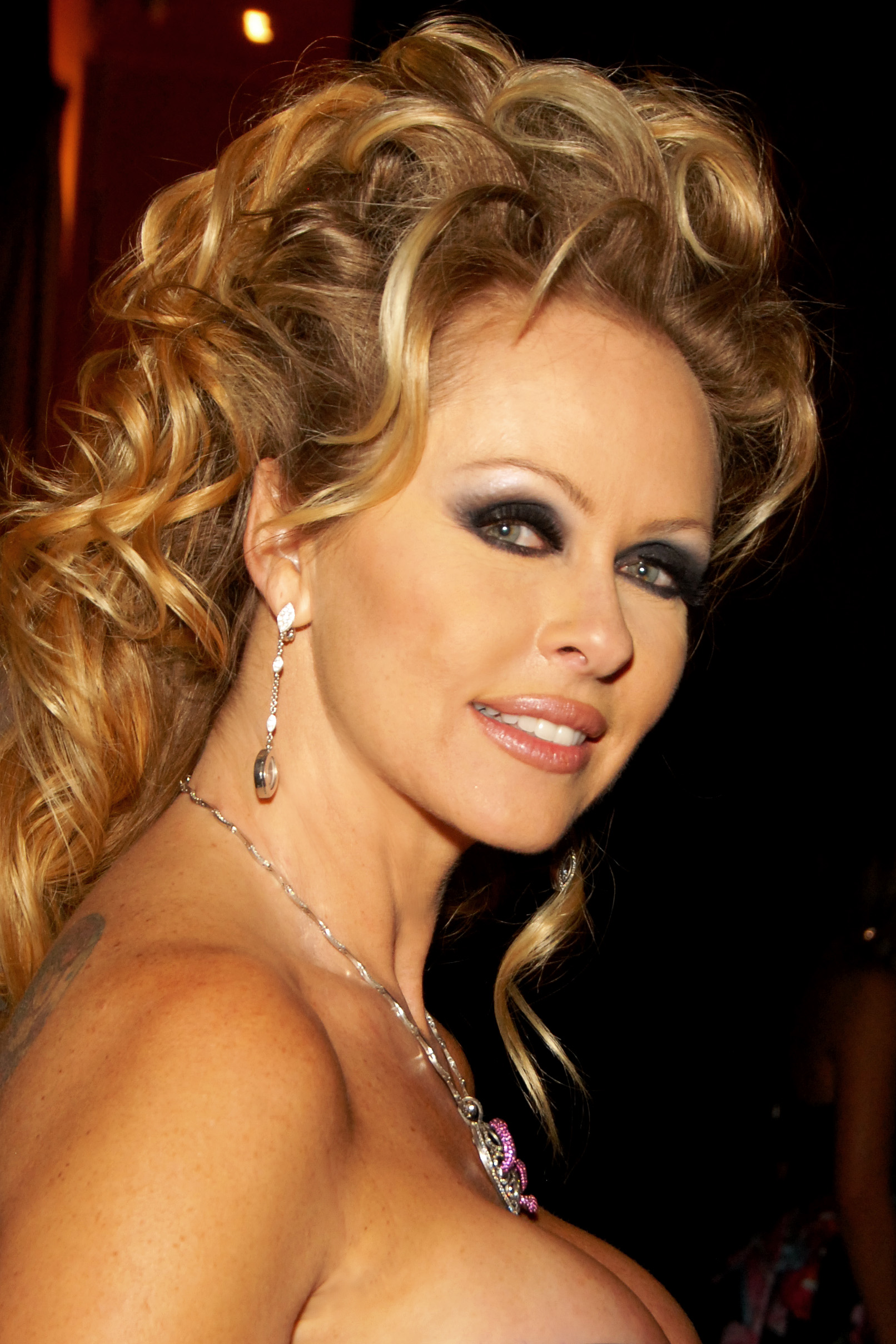
- Lauren attending the 25th Anniversary XRCO Awards in Hollywood, California, 2009
- Born: March 18, 1965 (age 61); Los Angeles, California, U.S.
- Other names: Diana Lauren; Dyanna Brown; Dyanna Gray
- Occupations: Erotic dancer; pornographic actress; singer; director
- Height: 5 ft 6 in (1.68 m)

Dyanna Lauren (born March 18, 1965) is an American erotic dancer, pornographic actress, singer, and director.

== Career ==
She appeared in over 200 movies between 1989 and 2000; in the years since, she has shifted away from acting and towards directing, even though she has remained an active onscreen performer into the 2010s.

Lauren was a singer before entering the adult industry. She explained her career change by saying, "I decided that if I was going to get screwed, I would at least get paid for it". Lauren has also composed a song called Psycho Magnet, a hard-rock ballad about being a porn star and being constantly stalked and harassed by "mentally ill mooks". Lauren's performance of the song, however, has been criticized by David Foster Wallace as having an argumentation that "strikes yr and a bit uneven" while also criticizing Lauren's singing as sounding like a "scalded cat". She performed "Silent Night/Feliz Navidad" with Moby on the 2003 album of the 2001 film Moby Presents: Alien Sex Party.

Lauren started out in porn appearing on box-covers for films that she was not in. Later, before deciding on going all the way on film, she would often make brief appearances in non-sexual roles, but would still front the film's cover nonetheless. Lauren was the Penthouse Pet of the Month in July 1995, and has been a contract performer with Vivid Entertainment. She was the first to appear as a single guest on Playboy TV's The Helmetcam Show. This appearance was broadcast live on August 21, 1996.

In addition to her work in adult films, Lauren also sang and appeared on the Marilyn Manson album Mechanical Animals, along with fellow porn star Kobe Tai.

In 2007, she became the CEO and spokesperson of Ninn Worx_SR, a film production company which is owned by her ex-husband, John Gray. Lauren was inducted into the AVN Hall of Fame at ceremonies held on January 12, 2008. In April 2009 she began filming for her first feature appearance in over ten years.

== Personal life ==
Lauren is bisexual.

She is of English, German, Irish, Australian and Native American descent.

She was married to Wild Boyz founder, Kurt Lee Hurley and John Grey, founder of the Spearmint Rhino Gentlemen's Club chain.

== Awards ==
- 1997 XRCO Award – Best Actress, Single Performance (Bad Wives)
- 1998 AVN Award – Best Actress, Film (Bad Wives)
- 1998 AVN Award – Best Anal Sex Scene, Film (Bad Wives) with Steven St. Croix
- 2008 AVN Hall of Fame inductee
- 2010 XBIZ Award – Performer Comeback of the Year
