= Leon Dewan =

American artist, inventor, and musician

Leon Dewan is an American artist, inventor, and musician. He collaborates with Brian Dewan on Dewanatron, an electronic music instrument project. The son of an inventor, Dewan received a degree in physics from Yale University in 1989. His musical career draws on his background in physics, and heavily incorporates electronic and experimental instruments.

Dewan resides in New Rochelle, in Westchester County, New York.

== Music ==
Leon Dewan has performed and recorded music with several bands spanning over a decade. Bands include Radeesh, The Happiest Guys in the World, Schaumgummi, Dangerspoon, Flaming Fire, and collaborative work with The Philistines Jr. Dewan sings and plays a variety electronic instruments including the electric guitar, the Theremin, and Dewanatron instruments.

=== Albums and collaborations ===
- The Happiest Guys in the World (as The Happiest Guys in the World) (1996)
- The Tarquin Records All Star Holiday Extravaganza (as The Happiest Guys in the World) (1997)
- Dewanatron (as Dewanatron) (2005)

=== Soundtracks ===
- Shadowbox (2007)

=== Music Videos ===
- Hey! Hey! It's the Vegetable Man! (as The Happiest Guys in the World)(1999) Directed by Paul Yates

== The Happiest Guys in the World ==
Dewan performed and recorded with the band The Happiest Guys in the World from 1991 through 2001. The band's music video Hey! Hey! It's the Vegetable Man! was screened at the 2004 International Surrealist Film Festival.

== Dewanatron ==
Leon Dewan and his cousin Brian Dewan collaborate on Dewanatron, an electronic music instrument project. The instruments have been performed and exhibited at the Pierogi 2000 gallery in Brooklyn in January 2006, Pierogi Leipzig (Germany) from April thru July 2006 and at Another Year in LA gallery as well as the Steve Allen Theater in Los Angeles in August/September, 2007. In March 2010, Dewanatron performed at the Town Hall in Manhattan opening for the Magnetic Fields.
