= Synthetic Pleasures =

- Directed by: Iara Lee
- Release date: 1996

Synthetic Pleasures (1996) is a documentary film by Iara Lee that explores the implications of virtual reality, digital and biotechnology, plastic surgery and mood-altering drugs.

== Reception ==
The film has a 17% rating on Rotten Tomatoes, based on 6 reviews. Roger Ebert for the Chicago Sun-Times gave it 2/4 stars, writing, "Seeing it, you may be frustrated because Lee is essentially just a cheerleader. But it will make you think. Or at least you will think you are thinking. If, of course, that is really you."
