= Peter Shapiro (journalist) =

American music journalist and lawyer (1969–2025)

- Born: August 22, 1969
- Died: July 2, 2025 (aged 55)
- Education: B.A., M.A
- Alma mater: University of Michigan, University of Sussex
- Occupations: Lawyer; music journalist
- Notable work: Turn the Beat Around: The Secret History of Disco, Modulations: A History of Electronic Music

Peter Shapiro (August 22, 1969 – July 2, 2025) was an American lawyer and music journalist. He wrote several reference works on music genres including Disco and Hip-hop, before moving into practice focusing on media law.

== Life and career ==
Shapiro had written for Spin, URB, Music Week, Uncut, Vibe, The Wire and The Times. He has written a number of Rough Guide reference works focused on music genres. These include The Rough Guide to Drum N' Bass in 1999 and The Rough Guide to Soul and R 'n' B, which was published in 2006. His 2005 book, The Rough Guide to Hip-Hop, has been cited as an "important" reference source on the subject, with entries that are "comprehensive and commendable".

After a decade in music journalism Shapiro moved into law. As of 2024 he specialized in media law and intellectual property, working for the BakerHostetler law firm.

=== Turn the Beat Around: The Secret History of Disco ===
In 2005 Shapiro authored the book Turn the Beat Around: The Secret History of Disco which charted the history of the Disco genre including from the Swingjugend of Nazi Germany and the Zazous of France, to how the repetitive beats "opened the doors to techno, house and hip-hop". It received positive critical reception, which included a review in The Observer that highlighted how the book rehabilitates the "dinosaur" that is Disco, and Gary Lachman of The Guardian stated he "put down the book knowing a great deal more about disco than I ever wanted to".

=== Death ===
After a two year battle with cancer, Shapiro died on July 2, 2025, at the age of 55.

== Bibliography ==
- Shapiro, Peter (1999). The Rough Guide to Drum N' Bass. London: Rough Guides. ISBN 9781858284330.
- Shapiro, Peter, ed. (2000). Modulations: A History of Electronic Music Throbbing Words on Sound. Caipirinha Productions. p. 255. ISBN 9781891024061.
- Shapiro, Peter (2000). Soul 100 Essential CDs : the Rough Guide. Rough Guides. ISBN 9781858285627.
- Shapiro, Peter; Authors, Individual (2002). Young, Rob (ed.). Undercurrents The Hidden Wiring of Modern Music. Bloomsbury Publishing. ISBN 9781441109934.
- Shapiro, Peter; Kennedy, Angus (2002). The Rough Guide Website Directory. Rough Guides. ISBN 9781843530114.
- Shapiro, Peter (2005). The Rough Guide to Hip-Hop. London: Rough Guides. p. 416. ISBN 1-84353-263-8.
- Shapiro, Peter (2005). Turn the Beat Around: The Secret History of Disco. Faber & Faber. p. 368. ISBN 9780571359820.
- Shapiro, Peter (2006). The Rough Guide to Soul and R 'n' B. Rough Guides. ISBN 9781843532644.
