= Irving Klaw Trio =

American experimental rock group

Irving Klaw Trio was an American experimental rock group formed in Olympia, Washington in the 1990s.

The band, named after Irving Klaw, was started when founding members Jeff Fuccillo, Jason Funk and Andrew Price met at the Evergreen State College. Later the group added saxophonist Ryan Polous but retained the "trio" name. Early recordings were influential lo-fi recordings released on numerous underground cassette tape labels such as Shrimper, Union Pole, Chocolate Monk and Catsup Plate. Later recordings were more refined and drew from a variety of influences including free jazz, space-rock and world music.

Jeff Fuccillo and Jason Funk now play in the Japanese improvisational band Helll. Andrew Price is a member of Hungry Ghost.

== Discography ==
- Irving Klaw Trio, this self-titled album was released on the Silly Bird label on March 29, 1996.
- Utek Pahtoo Mogoi, released on the Road Cone label on May 15, 1997.

== Independent reviews ==
- "Irving Klaw Trio - Utek Pahtoo Mogol". Splendid Reviews.
- "Irving Klaw Trio - Utek Pahtoo Mogol ( Label: Road Cone )". Hayfever (in German). Archived from the original on May 3, 2005.
