= Autobody (band) =

American rock band

- Origin: Brooklyn, New York, USA
- Genres: Avant-garde; Experimental rock Noise rock
- Years active: 1995–2001
- Labels: Haunted Toast; Silly Bird; Old Gold; Sweet Mistakes Productions
- Members: Jim Abramson; David Abel; Eric Marc Cohen; Sheila Bosco
- Past members: Nicholas Mir Chaikin

Autobody was a Brooklyn, New York based underground rock band. They released three albums on the Silly Bird label, as well as various other tapes and 7" records.

== Discography ==
- Black Angus (1997)
- Vanilla Impressions (1997)
- Underworld d-Tales, Vol. 4 (1998)
- Autobody (1999)
- Autobody EP (2001)
- Xelp (?)
- Black Angus Vol. II (?)

== Members ==
- David Abel — bass, guitar, vocals
- Jim Abramson — guitar, bass, vocals
- Sheila Bosco — drums, vocals
- Eric Marc Cohen — drums, bass

All hail from (or subsequently joined) other arty post-rock/freeform acts like Caroliner, Dymaxion, Fly Ashtray, Job's Daughters, Wharton Tiers Ensemble, Flaming Fire, The Aerosols, Bare Flames, and Drumhead.
