= Patrick Smith (artist) =

American artist (born 1972)

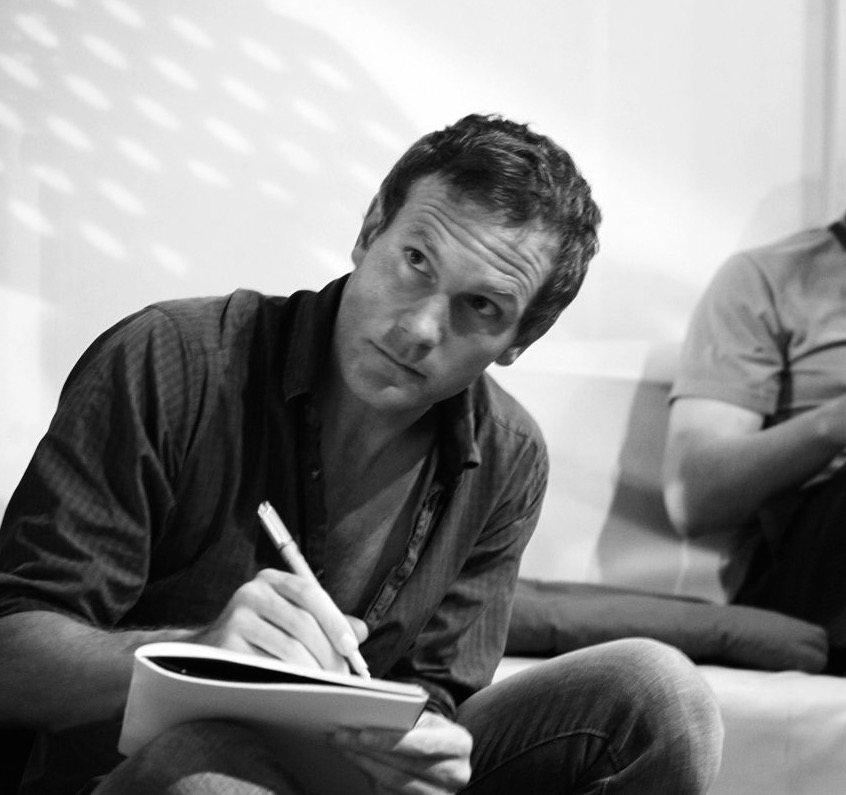
- Smith in Singapore 2013
- Born: February 18, 1972 (age 54); San Juan, Puerto Rico, U.S.
- Education: University of Massachusetts
- Known for: Animation
- Notable work: Daria, Masks, Puppet, Drink.
- Patrons: MTV, PBS Digital Studios

Patrick Smith (born 1972 in San Juan, Puerto Rico) is an American animator and YouTuber. He is a member of the Academy of Motion Picture Arts and Sciences (AMPAS). His formative years were spent as a storyboard artist for Walt Disney, and animation director for MTV's Daria and the Emmy-nominated Downtown. Smith spent five years in Singapore as a professor at the graduate film program for New York University Tisch School of the Arts, under artistic director/filmmaker Oliver Stone. His 2019 film "Pour 585" is one of the 5 most viewed Animated Shorts on YouTube, and Smith is one of the few YouTubers that retains a consistent film festival release schedule, his films have screened at Tribeca Film Festival, Slamdance, Ottawa, and Annecy, and hundreds of other festivals world-wide. His most recent stop motion short "Beyond Noh" is currently part of the acclaimed traveling showcase "The Animation Show of Shows." Patrick is a fellow of the New York Foundation of the Arts and a curator for multiple international film and animation festivals. The beginning of his animation career has been told by himself like this:

In 1994, I was in college, and one night decided to animate something strange. I didn't know how to draw, let alone animate, so I just did something abstract. A friend of mine told me I should put an logo on it and send it to MTV. So I mailed a VHS of it to "MTV Networks" the address I got from the phone book. About two weeks later I got a call from a guy named Abbey, who said that they wanted to buy it. I remember the day he called, because it was the same day that I got my rejection letter from Cal Arts. I re-animated the same thing, a bit tighter. The spot won a BDA award (Broadcast Design Association) and a Jury Prize at the 1995 Holland Animation Festival. After I finished the ID, MTV offered me a job on Beavis and Butt-Head, which was my first ever studio job, and which brought me to New York City.

His directorial debut was for the Emmy-nominated series Downtown, continuing on to direct the popular animated series Daria. Since then he has directed a handful of short films which earned him much reputation at film festivals worldwide as well as numerous awards. Smith and his studio produced the animated series Blank on Blank for PBS Digital Studios, an innovative animated show that visually illustrates rare audio interviews of famous artists, actors and musicians.

== Filmography ==
- Oblivious (1994) Director/Animator
- MTV Swallow-Face (1995) Director/Animator
- MTV Beavis and Butt-Head Do America (1996) Animator
- Life Animator (1999, collaborative)
- Drink (2001) Director/Animator
- Delivery (2003) Director/Animator
- Moving Along (2004) Director/Animator
- Handshake (2004) Director/Animator
- Puppet (2006) Director/Animator
- Masks (2010) Director/Animator
- Pittari (2017) Director/Animator
- Punch Everyone (2017) Director/Animator
- Body of Water (2017) Director/Animator
- Pour 585 (2018) Director/Animator

== Awards and honors ==
- 2018 Academy of Motion Picture Arts and Sciences (AMPAS) Member
- Best Animation Comicpalooza Film Festival 2018
- Best Animation NYC Downtown Short Film Festival 2018
- Best Story Animation Studio Festival 2018
- Best Animated Short, Woodstock Film Festival 2017
- Best Experimental Short, Santa Cruz Film Festival 2017
- Best Animated Short, Bend Film Festival 2017
- Best Animated Short, Raleigh Film Festival 2017
- Honorable Mention, Asia South East Short Film Festival 2017
- 2017 Spencer Barnett Memorial Fund Visiting Artist, Sarah Lawrence College.
- American Filmatic Arts Award 2017
- Audience Award, 2017 ASIFA-San Francisco Film Festival
- 2nd Place Independent, 2017 ASIFA-East
- Best Sound, 2017 ASIFA-East
- Audience Award 2017 ASIFA-San Francisco.
- Emmy Nomination, Wynton Marsalis, Outstanding New Approaches.
- Streamy Nomination, Best Animation.
- Best Animation, Santa Clarita Valley Film Festival.
- Jury Award, Durango Film Festival.
- Jury Award, Anima Mundi, Brazil.
- Surreal Animation Award, Dragon Con Film Fest, Presented by Ralph Bakshi.
- Excellence in Animation, ASIFA-East.
- Best Animation, Naperville Independent Film Festival.
- Best Animation, Wild Rose Independent Film Festival.
- Best Animation, Back Seat Independent Film Festival.
- Best Animation, Arizona Underground Film Festival.
- Best Animation, Dragon Con Film Festival.
- Best Animation, Great Lakes Film Festival.
- Best Animation, Phoenix Film Festival.
- Best Animation, First Sundays Film Festival, New York City.
- Honorable Mention, Smogdance Film Festival.
- Second Place, ASIFA-East (Assoc. Internationale du Film d'Animation).
- 3rd Place, Lake Havasu Film Festival.
- 1st Place, Dragon Con Film Festival, Atlanta.
- Best Music Video, No Exit Music Video Festival.
- Best Animation, Northampton Independent Film Festival.
- Best Animation, Action on Film Festival, Los Angeles.
- Best Animation, Griffin International Film Festival.
- Honorable Mention, Signals International Film Festival, UK.
- Best Animation, Grand Festival Award, Berkeley Film Festival.
- Best Animation, Garden State Film Festival.
- Best Animation, Myrtle Beach Film Festival.
- 3rd Place, First Glance Film Festival, Los Angeles.
- Second Place, Asheville Film Festival.
- Honorable Mention, Smogdance International Film Festival.
- Best Animation, Temecula Valley International Film Festival.
- Best Animation, Myrtle Beach Film Festival.
- Best Animation, Golden Film Festival.
- Best Animation, Spindletop Film Festival.
- Best Animation, Long Island Film Expo.
- Bronze Award, Kalamazoo Animation Festival.
- Best Animation, Black Point Film Festival.
- Best Music Video, Oxford Film Festival.
- Jury Award, Savannah Film Festival. Presented by Producer Don Bluth.
- 1st Place, ASIFA-East (Association Internationale du Film d'Animation).
- Pulcinella Award Nomination, Cartoons on the Bay, Italy.
- Honorable Mention, Tribeca Underground Film Festival.
- Honorable Mention, ASIFA San Fran.
- Best Animation, Northampton Film Festival.
- Jury Prize, China International Cartoon Animation Festival.
- Best Music Video, Urban Mediamakers Film Festival.
- Winner, IMVF, International Music Video Festival.
- Winner, Sponsored Films, ASIFA-East Animation Festival.
- 1st Place, ASIFA-East (Association Internationale du Film d'Animation).
- Winner, "The One to Watch" Award, Chicago Animation Festival.
- Gold Pencil Award, The One Club.
- DTC National Communication Bronze Award.
- 2nd Place, ASIFA-San Francisco Animation Festival.
- 2nd Place, ASIFA-East (Association Internationale du Film d'Animation).
- Best Debut Film, New York Film Expo.
- Jury Award, Holland Animation Festival.
- Fellowship Grant. New York Foundation for the Arts.
- Bronze Award. BDA (Broadcast Design Assoc.)
- Fellowship Grant. Cable Endowment of Springfield Public Service Grant.
