= Carol Kitman =

American photographer (1930–2026)

Carolyne Kitman (née Sibushnik; February 1, 1930 – March 3, 2026) was an American photographer. She followed the lives of twin brothers Alexander and Eugene Vindman in a decades-long documentary project. Kitman died in The Bronx on March 3, 2026, at the age of 96.
