= Paul Sanchez IV =

American filmmaker

Paul Francis Sanchez IV, aka Paul Yates, is an American filmmaker, film and television screenwriter, artist, and musician.

Sanchez attended New York University Tisch School of the Arts for photography, received a BFA in film from SUNY Purchase in 1993 and received his M.F.A. in directing from AFI Conservatory in 2006 where he was the recipient of the Tom Yoda Scholarship Award.

Sanchez with his semi-autobiographical pilot AV'82 was selected as one of only 7 projects to participate in the annual Sundance Institute's Episodic Lab, held at the Sundance Resort in Utah.

Sanchez began working in the film industry at age 9. Despite losing his family and becoming homeless at 15, Sanchez has made music videos or shot footage for Moby, R.E.M., The Dandy Warhols, The Zambonis, Mr. Flannery of Little-T and One Track Mike, and The Neighbourhood and many others. Sanchez's films have screened in festivals in Berlin, Havana, Singapore, and Tribeca, among others. Sanchez was the director of photography on the feature documentary Modulations, which screened at Sundance Film Festival. Sanchez's first directed feature, Moby Presents: Alien Sex Party was released in 2003. Yates's AFI thesis film Onion Underwater starring Rachel Miner was a 2007 Tribeca Film Festival selection. In 2017, Sanchez penned the Lifetime movie: The Landlord also known as Fatherly Obsession which starred Ted McGinley.

As Paul Francis Sanchez Yates, Sanchez sings backup vocals on the James Kochalka album Spread Your Evil Wings and Fly. The Philistines Jr., helmed by Grammy Award winning producer, Peter Katis, wrote a tribute song to Sanchez entitled: The Ballad of Paul Yates. Sanchez is a former member of the band.

In October 2001, Time Magazine reported that Sanchez actioned and sold Moby's eternal soul for US$41 on eBay.

Sanchez is an avid photobooth artist and a monograph of his work was collected by the MoMA. His German pop star alter ego Schaumgummi has had several pop hits in Germany. Sanchez was Moby's keyboardist during his live shows during the 1990s. Sanchez has performed on the Late Show with David Letterman and Woodstock 1999 where he was also a documentarian. His footage appears in the HBO documentary Woodstock 99: Peace, Love, and Rage. Sanchez did an extensive shadowing of the writers and director for the TV series Battlestar Galactica. He was also a pilot for the Red Bull Flugtag event in New York City in 2003. Sanchez is the founder of The International Surrealist Film Festival.

Sanchez has been a finalist in both the Disney Entertainment Television (DET) Writing Program and the BlueCat Screenplay Competitions.

In 2024 Paul Sanchez IV's short art-horror film Babyteeth, had its festival premiere at the Oscar Micheaux and the Dances With Films festivals.

== Filmography ==
Year	Title	Notes
1987	Geranium	
1990	I Am Curious Onion	
1991	My Father's Son	
1994	Space Water Onion	
1997	The Leaf Blower	underwater photographer and actor
1998	Modulations	
2001	Moby Presents: Alien Sex Party	AKA Porno
2006	Onion Underwater	
2010	The People vs. George Lucas	as himself
2017	The Landlord aka Fatherly Obsession	
2020	Save the Cat Online Beat Sheet Workshop	series producer and director
2021	Woodstock 99: Peace, Love, and Rage	documentarian and performer
2024	Babyteeth	
