= Dewanatron =

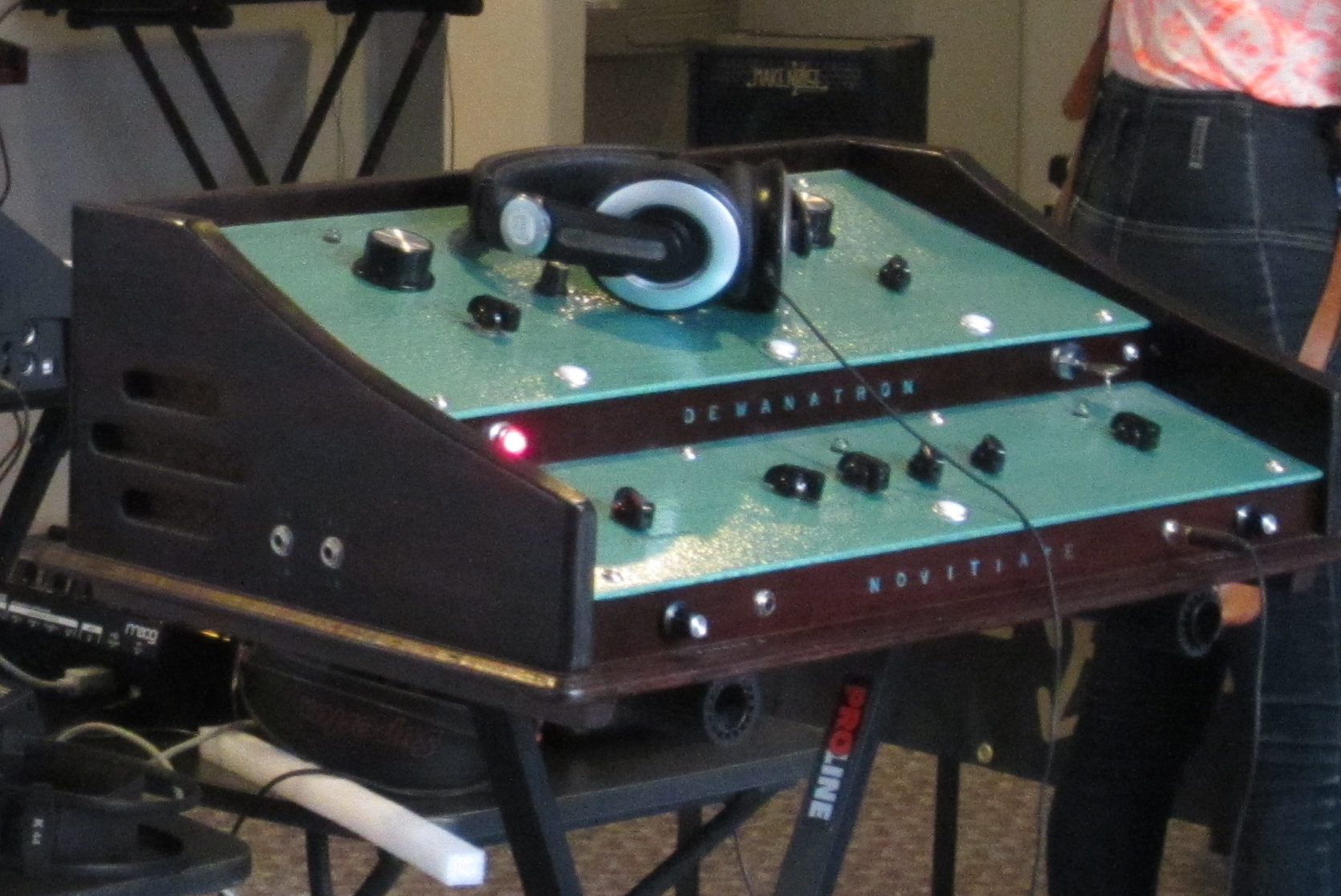
Dewanatron Novitiate (exhibited at moogfest 2012)

Dewanatron is a family of experimental electronic instruments.

Cousins Brian Dewan and Leon Dewan collaborate on the creation and performance of these instruments. The instruments have been performed and exhibited at the Pierogi 2000 gallery in Brooklyn in January 2006, Pierogi Leipzig (Germany) from April through July 2006 and at ANOTHER YEAR IN LA gallery as well as The Steve Allen Theater in Los Angeles in August/September, 2007 and May 31, 2009 at the Ghetto Gloss Gallery.

== Instruments ==
- Swarmatron
- Novitiate – a one-of-a-kind educational instrument designed for the Bob Moog Foundation
- Hymnotron
- Melody Gin
- Dual Primate Console
