= Slobozia =

- Municipality
- Orthodox Cathedral of Slobozia

- Coat of arms

- Location in Ialomița County

- Location in Romania
- Coordinates: 44°33′50″N 27°21′58″E
- Country: Romania
- County: Ialomița

Government
  - Mayor (2024–2028): Dănuț-Alexandru Potor (PSD)
- Area: 126.72 km^{2} (48.93 sq mi)
- Population (2021-12-01): 41,550
  - Density: 327.9/km^{2} (849.2/sq mi)
- Time zone: UTC+02:00 (EET)
  - Summer (DST): UTC+03:00 (EEST)
- Postal code: 9200xx
- Area code: (+40) 02 43
- Vehicle reg.: IL
- Website: municipiulslobozia.ro

Slobozia (Romanian pronunciation: [sloboˈzi.a]) is the capital city of Ialomița County, Muntenia, Romania, with a population of 41,550 in 2021.

== Etymology ==
Its name is from the Romanian "slobozie", which meant a recently colonized village which was free of taxation. The word itself comes from the Slavic word "slobod" which means "free". As it is located in the middle of flat land (Bărăgan Plain), it was very vulnerable to Tatar and Ottoman incursions. To encourage peasants to settle there, they were exempted from some taxes, hence the name.

== Geography ==
Slobozia lies roughly in the middle of the county, on the banks of Ialomița River, at about 120 km (75 mi) east of Bucharest and 150 km (93 mi) west of Constanța, important port at the Black Sea. The city is within 17 km (11 mi) of the Bucharest-Constanța A2 Motorway (Autostrada Soarelui).

The total area of the municipality is 126.72 km^{2} (48.93 sq mi). In the present administrative form, Slobozia consists of Slobozia proper and the neighbourhoods of Bora and Slobozia Nouă.

== Economy ==
The main activity in the area is agriculture, processing of the agricultural products and light industry.

== Culture ==
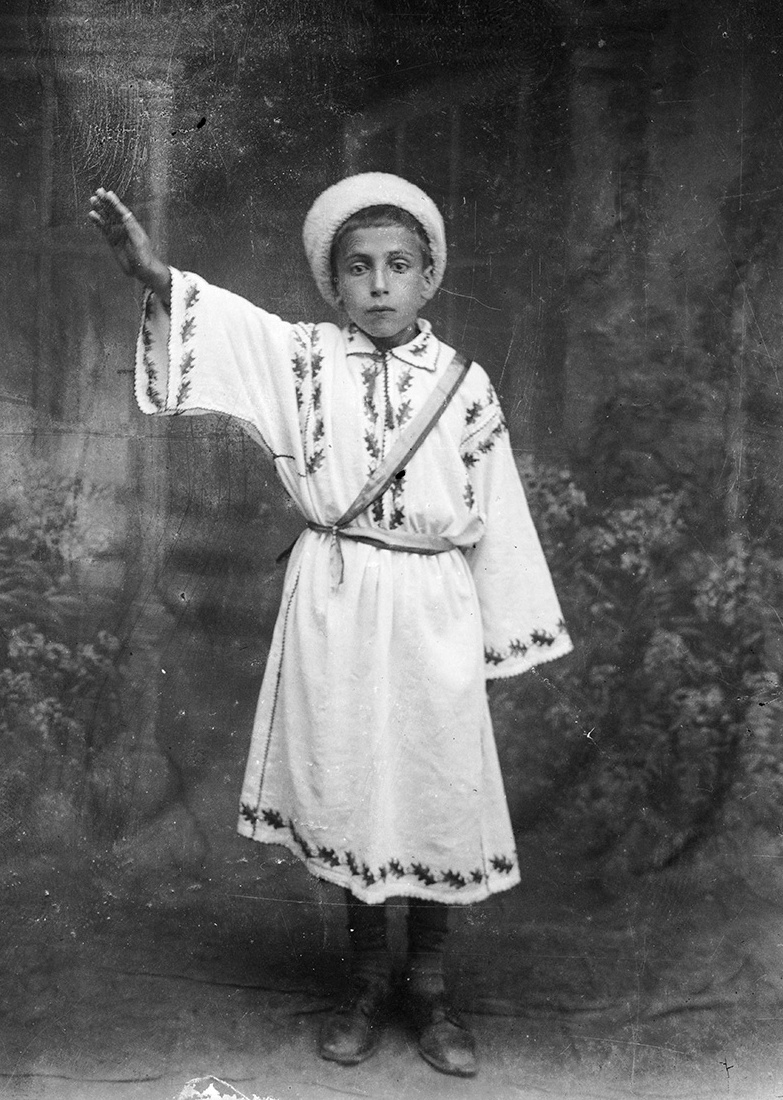
Traditional costume of the Slobozia region

In 1990 the Cultural Centre was inaugurated, bearing the name of the conductor and composer Ionel Perlea, a city native. The building houses exhibition and performance rooms, bookstores, cultural institutions. In 1999 the Cultural Centre Ionel Perlea entered the UNESCO circuit.

The city is the headquarters of the Romanian Orthodox Diocese of Slobozia and Călărași, established in 1993.

== Demographics ==
At the 2002 census, 97.6% of inhabitants were ethnic Romanians and 2.2% Roma. 98.6% were Romanian Orthodox, 0.4% Seventh-day Adventist and 0.2% Roman Catholic.

== Tourism ==
The main tourist attraction consists of the nearby Lake Amara, situated 5 km (3.1 mi) away. Amara Resort is also a balneoclimateric resort. Access to Amara is by minibuses that leave every 15 minutes from the Slobozia Train Station. As part of a private tourist complex, there is a small copy of the Eiffel Tower 54 m (177 ft) high.

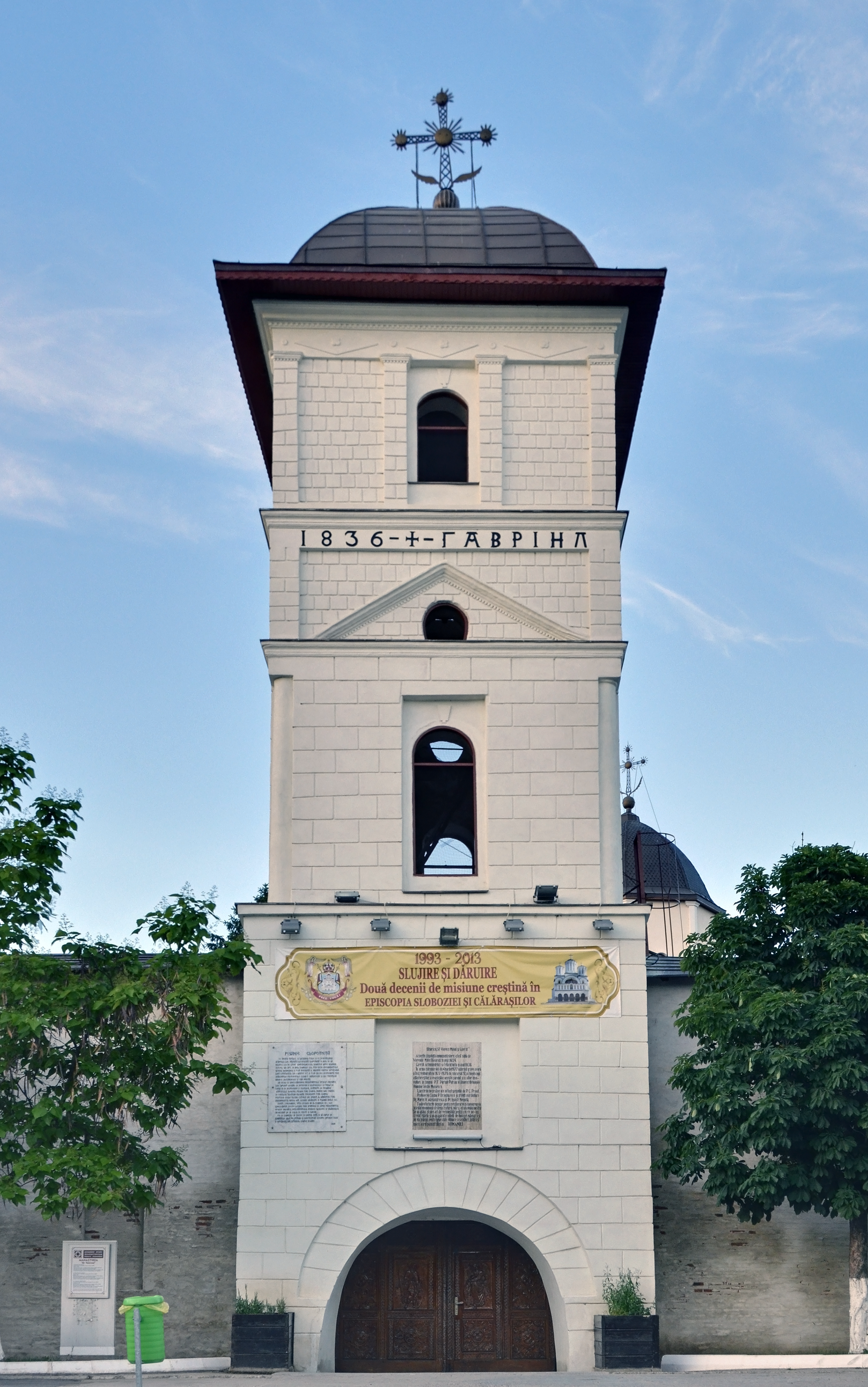
Sfinții Voievozi Monastery

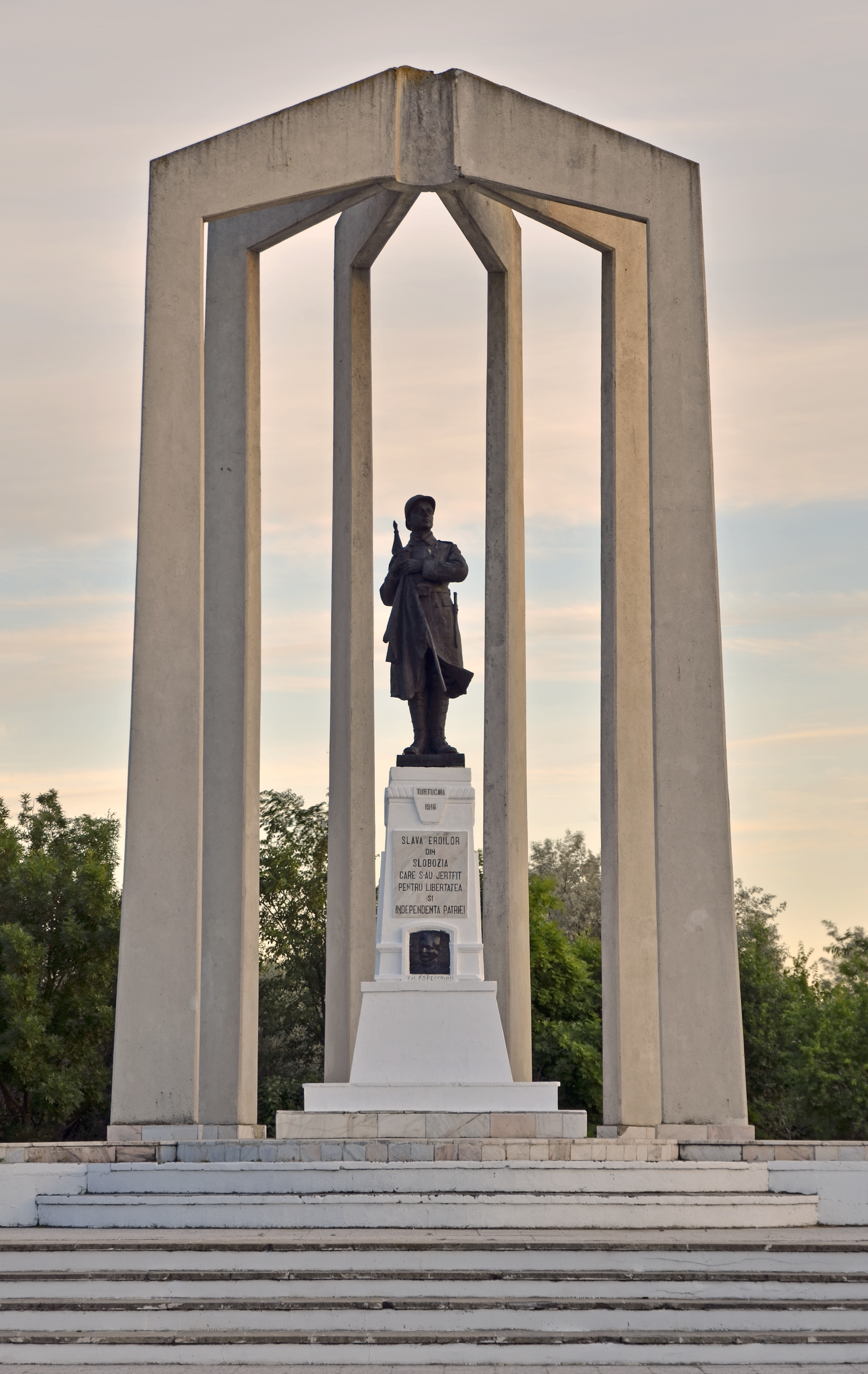
Heroes' Monument

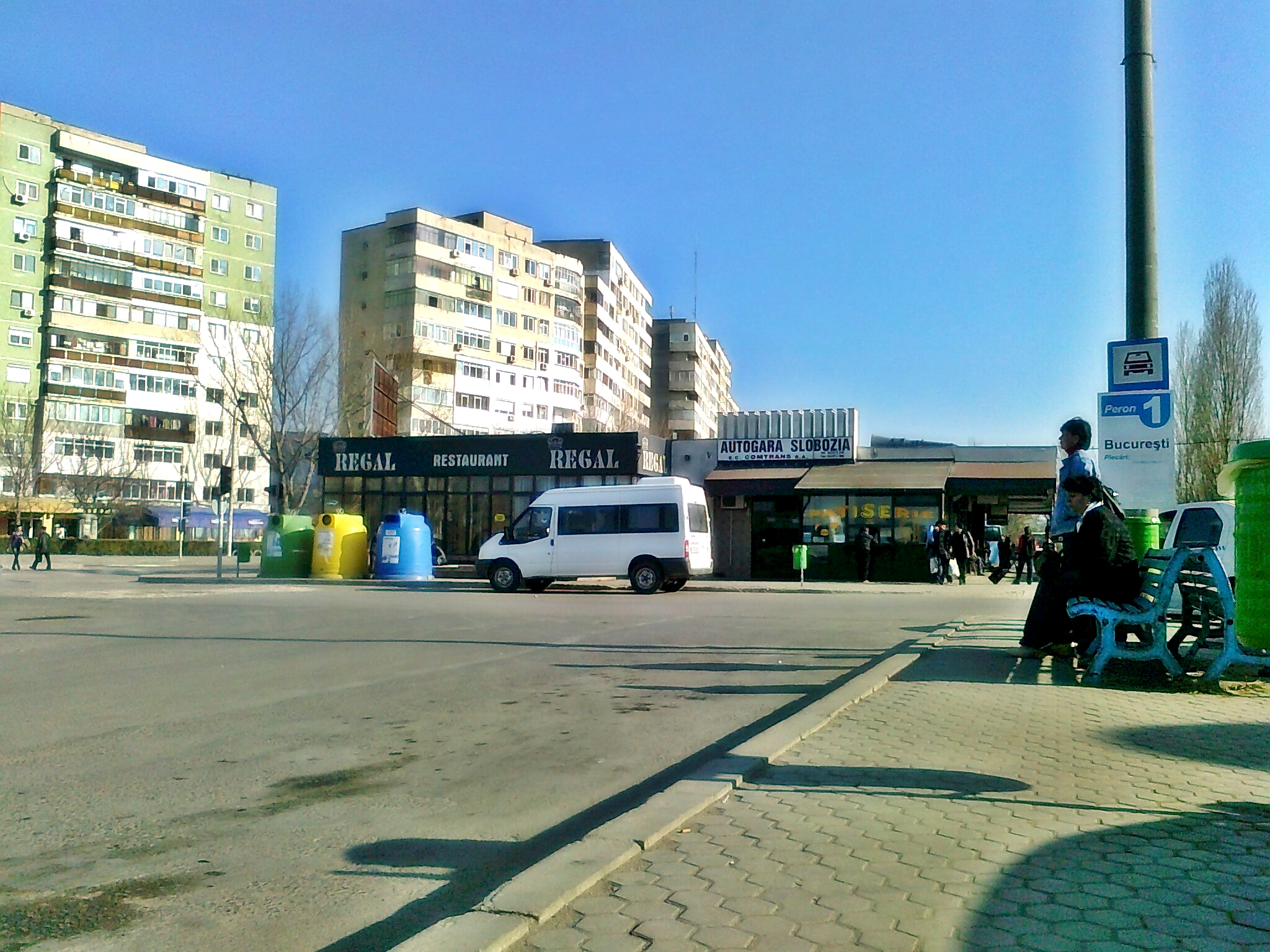
Bus terminal

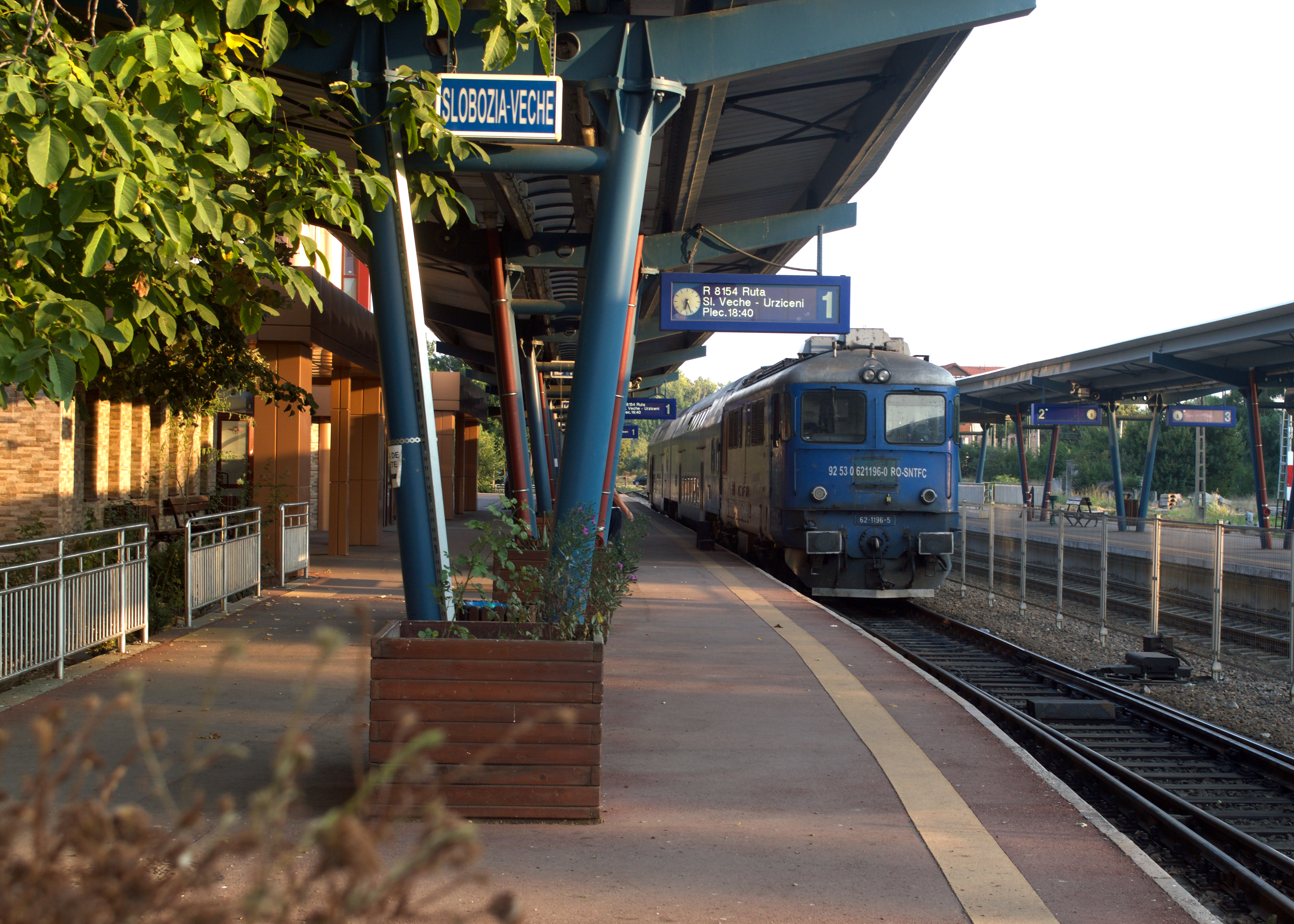
Slobozia Veche railway station

== Twin towns and sister cities ==
Slobozia is twinned with:

- Nanyang, China
- Razgrad, Bulgaria
- Silistra, Bulgaria
- Veles, North Macedonia

== Notable people ==
- Alin Badea (born 1988), sabre fencer
- Mihaela Bulică (born 1990), sabre fencer
- Mircea Dinescu (born 1950), poet, journalist, and editor
- Petre Dumitru (born 1957), weightlifter
- Petru Filip (born 1955), politician
- Cristina Gheorghe (born 1986), handballer
- Adrian Mihalcea (born 1976), footballer
- Minelli (born 1988), singer, songwriter, and lyricist
- Doina Spîrcu (born 1970), rower
- Iulian Teodosiu (born 1994), sabre fencer
- Adrian Ursea (born 1967), football player and manager
- Elena Voicu (born 1990), handballer
