= Here Come the ABCs =

2005 studio album by They Might Be Giants

Studio album by They Might Be Giants
- Released: February 15, 2005
- Recorded: 1999 ("Clap Your Hands"), January–April 2004
- Studios: Kampo Studios (Manhattan); Skyline Studio (Manhattan); Hello Studio (Brooklyn); Collier Bros. Studio (Brooklyn)
- Genre: Children's music
- Length: 41:47
- Label: Disney Sound/Idlewild
- Producers: They Might Be Giants and Pat Dillett

They Might Be Giants chronology
Venue Songs (2004)	Here Come the ABCs (2005)	The Else (2007)

Professional ratings
Review scores
Source	Rating
Allmusic	link
Common Sense Media	link
Robert Christgau	link

Here Come the ABCs is the second children's album and eleventh studio album by American alternative rock band They Might Be Giants, aimed at young children learning the alphabet. The CD and DVD were originally released separately but have since been released as a combo. There are 25 songs in the CD and 34 in the DVD.

While it was produced and released by Walt Disney Records under their Disney Sound label, the band was reportedly given complete creative control over the project, which at the time was very unusual for Walt Disney Records; until then, they had followed a strict artist control policy. As a result, the DVD features puppetry, animation and live action supplied by personal friends of the group, including AJ Schnack, who directed the TMBG documentary Gigantic (A Tale of Two Johns). Family members of the band, including John Flansburgh's wife Robin Goldwasser, and John Linnell's son, Henry, contributed some guest vocals. The music videos that appear on the DVD were also aired (in part or whole) on the Disney Channel's children's programming block, Playhouse Disney.

Here Come the ABCs was a great success for They Might Be Giants, the video being certified Gold (sales over 50,000) in 2005. The album reached #1 on Billboard's Children's Music charts, won Parenting Magazine's Children's DVD of the Year Award and two National Parenting Publications Awards (NAAPA). In addition, Amazon.com called it "the best Children's Music album of 2005" and the 13th best overall album of 2005. Two follow-ups were released, Here Come the 123s in 2008 and Here Comes Science in 2009.

Although the audio-only release is considered to be They Might Be Giants' 11th studio album, some of the songs make little sense without their visual accompaniment.

== Track listing ==
=== CD ===
All songs by They Might Be Giants unless otherwise noted.

No.	Title	Length
1.	"Here Come The ABCs"	0:11
2.	"Alphabet Of Nations"	1:26
3.	"E Eats Everything"	2:43
4.	"Flying V"	1:34
5.	"Q U"	1:09
6.	"Go For G!"	1:14
7.	"Pictures Of Pandas Painting"	2:07
8.	"D & W"	1:37
9.	"Fake-Believe"	1:51
10.	"Can You Find It?"	2:55
11.	"The Vowel Family"	1:59
12.	"Letter/Not A Letter"	1:08
13.	"Alphabet Lost And Found" (Marty Beller)	2:49
14.	"I C U"	1:49
15.	"Letter Shapes"	1:22
16.	"Who Put The Alphabet In Alphabetical Order?"	1:46
17.	"Rolling O"	1:26
18.	"L M N O"	1:43
19.	"C Is For Conifers"	2:37
20.	"Fake-Believe (Type B)"	1:56
21.	"D Is For Drums"	2:21
22.	"Z Y X"	1:21
23.	"Goodnight My Friends"	0:25
24.	"Clap Your Hands (Note: A bonus track)"	1:21
25.	"Here In Higglytown" (Theme To Playhouse Disney's Higglytown Heroes) (Dan Miller, They Might Be Giants)	0:58

1. A bonus track

=== DVD ===
1. "Here Come The ABCs" – 0:25
2. "Alphabet Of Nations" – 1:26
3. "E Eats Everything" – 2:43
4. "Flying V" – 1:34
5. "I Am A Robot" – 1:29
6. "Q U" – 1:09
7. "Go For G!" – 1:14
8. "Pictures Of Pandas Painting" – 2:07
9. "D & W" – 1:37
10. "Fake-Believe" – 1:51
11. "Can You Find It?" – 2:55
12. "The Vowel Family" – 1:59
13. "A To Z" – 0:24
14. "Letter/Not A Letter" – 1:08
15. "Letter Shapes" – 1:22
16. "Alphabet Lost And Found" (Marty Beller) – 2:49
17. "I C U" – 1:49
18. "I Am A Robot (Type B)" – 0:56
19. "Who Put The Alphabet In Alphabetical Order?" – 1:46
20. "Rolling O" – 1:26
21. "L M N O" – 1:43
22. "C Is For Conifers" – 2:37
23. "Fake-Believe (Type B)" – 1:56
24. "A To Z (Type B)" – 0:29
25. "D Is For Drums" – 2:21
26. "Z Y X" – 1:21
27. "Goodnight My Friends" – 0:25
28. "Here Come The ABCs" (Reprise) – 0:11
29. "Clap Your Hands" – 1:21
30. "Violin" – 3:33
31. "Stalk Of Wheat" – 1:19
32. "Robot Parade" – 2:27
33. "Sleepwalkers" – 2:52
34. "Here In Higglytown" (Theme To Playhouse Disney's Higglytown Heroes) – 2:05
35. "End Credits" – 2:15

== Exclusive bonus tracks ==
Special editions with exclusive bonus tracks were produced for various outlets. Bonus tracks include:

- "Hovering Sombrero '05" on the Amazon.com CD, "I Never Go To Work" on the Best Buy CD; both songs appear on the Amazon.com CD/DVD combo release
- 2 exclusive videos for "Violin", "Stalk of Wheat" on the Amazon.com DVD; 2 more exclusive videos, along with the other 2, "Robot Parade" and "Sleepwalkers" appear on the Amazon.com CD/DVD combo release
- An iTunes single was released for "T-Shirt" as a companion to Here Come the ABCs. According to an early tracklisting posted online, the song was meant to be sequenced between "D Is For Drums" and "Z Y X", but was cut for unknown reasons.

== Personnel ==
=== They Might Be Giants ===
- John Flansburgh – lead and backing vocals, guitar
- John Linnell – lead and backing vocals, piano, accordion, saxophone

Additional musicians

- Dan Miller – guitar, piano
- Danny Weinkauf – bass guitar
- Marty Beller – drums, lead vocals on "Alphabet Lost and Found"
- Dan Levine – trombone on "D & W", "Letter/Not A Letter", "Rolling O" and "A to Z (Type B)", tuba on "Flying V", "Go for G" and "Fake Believe (Part 1)"
- Mark Pender – trumpet on "D & W", "Letter/Not A Letter", "Rolling O" and "A to Z (Type B)"
- Dan Hickey – drums on "Clap Your Hands"
- Pat Dillet – piano on "Goodnight My Friends"
- Robin Goldwasser – lead vocals on "Who Put the Alphabet in Alphabetical Order?"
- Henry Linnell – lead vocals on "Letter/Not A Letter"
- Desi Tomaselli – lead vocals on "Letter/Not A Letter

Production

- Pat Dillett, They Might Be Giants – producers

=== Production crew ===
- Executive Producer: David Agnew
- Audio Engineer/Mixer: Pat Dillett
- Audio Mastering: UE Nastosi at Sterling Sound Studios NYC
- Recorded at: Kampo Studios and Skyline Studios, Manhattan, New York
- Additional Recording at: Collier Brothers Studios and Hello Studios, Brooklyn, New York
- Band Manager: Jamie Lincoin Kitman at Homblow Studios USA

=== Video production crew ===
- Music Performed by They Might Be Giants
- DVD Produced by Bonfire Films of America
- Directed by AJ Schnack
- Starring Chris Anderson, John Flansburgh, John Linnell, AD Miles
- Animated by Courtney Booker, Euan Mitchell, Greg Rozum and Divya Srinivasan
- Animation Produced at Asterisk, The Chopping Block Studios Inc. and Colourmovie

== In popular culture ==
- "Clap Your Hands" was featured when the band made a guest appearance on the final episode of Blue's Clues, titled "Bluestock".
- "Can You Find It?" was featured on the soundtrack to the movie Wordplay.
- "Robot Parade" was featured during the credits to an episode of the animated television series The Simpsons, titled "Them, Robot".
