= Here Come the 123s =

Studio album by They Might Be Giants
- Released: February 5, 2008
- Recorded: 2004 ("I Never Go To Work", "High Five"); August 14, 2004 ("John Lee Supertaster (Live)"); Late 2005 ("Hot Dog!", "Mickey Mouse Clubhouse"); November 2006 – Summer 2007; August 1, 2007 ("Bed Bed Bed (Live)")
- Venues: The Fillmore, San Francisco ("John Lee Supertaster (Live)"); Bowery Ballroom, Manhattan ("Bed Bed Bed (Live)")
- Studios: Kampo Studio, Manhattan; Loho Studios, Manhattan; Collyer Brothers Studio, Brooklyn; Mr. Sniffles Room of Gloom, Sullivan County
- Genre: Children's music
- Length: 44:33
- Label: Disney Sound/Idlewild
- Producers: They Might Be Giants, Pat Dillett

They Might Be Giants chronology
The Else (2007)	Here Come the 123s (2008)	Here Comes Science (2009)

Here Come the 123s is the third children's album and thirteenth studio album by American alternative rock band They Might Be Giants. It is the sequel to the group's 2005 album Here Come the ABCs. The songs are edutainment music, and like ABCs, both a CD and DVD were released. It was initially set to be released on October 2, 2007, but was pushed back to February 5, 2008.

== Track listing ==
All songs written by They Might Be Giants, except as noted.

No.	Title	Length
1.	"Here Come the 123s"	0:08
2.	"Zeroes"	1:06
3.	"One Everything"	2:52
4.	"Number Two" (Danny Weinkauf)	2:19
5.	"Triops Has Three Eyes"	2:35
6.	"Apartment Four"	1:21
7.	"High Five!" (Marty Beller)	2:23
8.	"The Secret Life of Six"	2:01
9.	"Seven"	2:09
10.	"Seven Days of the Week (I Never Go to Work)"	1:54
11.	"Figure Eight"	2:36
12.	"Pirate Girls Nine"	1:21
13.	"Nine Bowls of Soup"	2:12
14.	"Ten Mississippi"	0:51
15.	"One Dozen Monkeys"	1:34
16.	"Eight Hundred and Thirteen Mile Car Trip" (They Might Be Giants/Timothy James Cawley)	0:57
17.	"Infinity" (Dan Miller/Robert Sharenow)	3:13
18.	"I Can Add"	2:04
19.	"Nonagon"	1:23
20.	"Even Numbers"	2:35
21.	"Ooh La! Ooh La!"	1:56
22.	"Heart of the Band"	1:39
23.	"Hot Dog!"	2:29
24.	"Mickey Mouse Clubhouse Theme"	0:57
Total length:		39:95

=== DVD ===
No.	Title	Length
1.	"Here Come the 123s"
2.	"Zeroes"
3.	"One Everything"
4.	"Number Two"
5.	"Triops Has Three Eyes"
6.	"Apartment Four"
7.	"High Five!"
8.	"The Secret Life of Six"
9.	"Seven"
10.	"Seven Days of the Week (I Never Go to Work)"
11.	"Figure Eight"
12.	"Pirate Girls Nine"
13.	"Nine Bowls of Soup"
14.	"Ten Mississippi"
15.	"One Dozen Monkeys"
16.	"Eight Hundred and Thirteen Mile Car Trip"
17.	"I Can Add"
18.	"Nonagon"
19.	"Even Numbers"
20.	"Ooh La! Ooh La!"
21.	"Heart of the Band"
22.	"Hot Dog!"
23.	"Mickey Mouse Clubhouse Theme"

== Reception ==
Professional ratings
Review scores
Source	Rating
AllMusic	4/5 stars
Common Sense Media	4/5 stars
Entertainment Weekly	A
Paste	3.5/5 stars
Pitchfork Media	(5.2/10)
Robert Christgau	A−

The album won a Grammy Award in 2009, in the Best Musical Album for Children category. Here Come the 123s received a Silver Honor award in the Parents' Choice Award Fall 2008 Music category.

== Personnel ==
=== Musicians ===
- John Flansburgh – lead and backing vocals, acoustic and electric guitars
- John Linnell – lead and backing vocals, accordion, piano, saxophone
- Dan Miller – electric guitar, piano, lead vocals on "Infinity"
- Danny Weinkauf – bass guitar, lead vocals on "Number Two"
- Marty Beller – drums, lead vocals on "High Five!" and "Hot Dog!"
- Robin Goldwasser – lead vocals on "Ten Mississippi" and "Ooh La! Ooh La!"
- Hannah Levine – lead vocals on "High Five!", "One Dozen Monkeys", "I Can Add", and "Ooh La! Ooh La!"
- Mark Pender – trumpet on "Seven Days of the Week (I Never Go to Work)"
- Dan Levine – trombone on "Hot Dog!", tuba on "Mickey Mouse Clubhouse Theme"

=== Production crew ===
- Executive producer: David Agnew
- Produced by Pat Dillett and They Might Be Giants
- Engineered and mixed by Pat Dillett

=== Video production crew ===
- DVD Produced by Walt Disney Studios Home Entertainment In Association with Idlewild Records
- Music performed by They Might Be Giants
- Visuals produced by Pat Dillett
- Directed by AJ Schnack
- Flansburgh & Linnell cutscenes directed by Feel Good Anyway
- Videos Animated by David Cowles, Jeremy Galante and Divya Srinivasan
- Animation Produced at Asterisk, Colormovie, DHX Media Ltd., Feel Good Anyway and Walt Disney Television Animation

== Certifications ==
Certifications for "Here Come the 123s"
Region	Certification	Certified units/sales
United States (RIAA)	Gold	50,000^{^}
^{^} Shipments figures based on certification alone.
