= The Else =

2007 studio album by They Might Be Giants

Studio album by They Might Be Giants
- Released: May 15, 2007
- Recorded: 2006–2007
- Studios: Kampo (New York City); Avatar (New York City); Loho (New York City); Collyer Brothers (New York City); Soy Bomb (Sullivan County, New York); The Boat (Los Angeles, California)
- Genre: Alternative rock
- Length: 38:12
- Labels: Idlewild, Zoë Records
- Producers: The Dust Brothers; Pat Dillett; They Might Be Giants

They Might Be Giants chronology
Here Come the ABCs (2005)	The Else (2007)	Here Come the 123s (2008)

The Else is the twelfth studio album by American alternative rock band They Might Be Giants, released by Idlewild Recordings on May 15, 2007. The album was produced in part by the Dust Brothers, along with Pat Dillett and the band.

The Else was first available for download through the iTunes Store on May 15, 2007. The CD version was released in stores on July 10, 2007, with initial runs accompanied by a full-length bonus disc of rare material, Cast Your Pod to the Wind (the title being a parody of jazz pianist Vince Guaraldi's 1962 hit "Cast Your Fate to the Wind"). On September 11, 2007, the band released a gatefold LP of the album.

== Recording ==
"Contrecoup" was originally written and recorded in 2005 as part of a challenge issued on the Next Big Thing in which lexicographer Erin McKean implored John Linnell to use the words "contrecoup", "craniosophic", and "limerent" in a song so that the words could be added to or remain in the dictionary.

"Careful What You Pack" was originally written for the soundtrack of 2009 film Coraline, though it never appeared in the film.

== Track listing ==
All tracks are written by John Flansburgh and John Linnell except as noted.

No.	Title	Writer(s)	Length
1.	"I'm Impressed"		2:39
2.	"Take Out the Trash"		3:14
3.	"Upside Down Frown"		2:17
4.	"Climbing the Walls"		3:15
5.	"Careful What You Pack"		2:40
6.	"The Cap'm"		3:11
7.	"With the Dark"		3:17
8.	"The Shadow Government"		2:37
9.	"Bee of the Bird of the Moth"		3:31
10.	"Withered Hope"	John Flansburgh; John Linnell; Mike Simpson; John King	2:54
11.	"Contrecoup"		3:11
12.	"Feign Amnesia"		2:29
13.	"The Mesopotamians"		2:57
Total length:			38:12

Japan release bonus tracks
No.	Title	Length
14.	"Brain Problem Situation"	2:55
15.	"We Live in a Dump"	1:40
16.	"I'm Your Boyfriend Now"	2:40

=== Cast Your Pod to the Wind (bonus disc) ===
No.	Title	Length
1.	"Put Your Hand on the Computer"	1:57
2.	"I'm Your Boyfriend Now"	2:40
3.	"Why Did You Grow a Beard?"	1:08
4.	"We Live in a Dump"	1:40
5.	"Brain Problem Situation"	2:55
6.	"Sketchy Galore"	2:21
7.	"Microphone"	2:04
8.	"Vestibule"	1:59
9.	"Greasy Kid Stuff"	1:40
10.	"Metal Detector (live)"	3:43
11.	"Employee of the Month"	1:24
12.	"Homunculus"	2:16
13.	"No Plan B (live)"	1:40
14.	"Morgan in the Morning"	1:07
15.	"Kendra McCormick"	0:51
16.	"Yeah, the Deranged Millionaire"	1:23
17.	"My Other Phone Is a Boom Car"	0:27
18.	"I Hear a New World"	2:09
19.	"(She Was A) Hotel Detective in the Future"	2:05
20.	"Haunted Floating Eye"	1:25
21.	"Scott Bower"	1:23
22.	"The Mexican Drill"	1:10
23.	"Cast Your Pod to the Wind"	1:26

== Personnel ==
They Might Be Giants

- John Flansburgh – songwriting, vocals, guitars, programming
- John Linnell – songwriting, vocals, keyboards, programming

Backing band

- Marty Beller – drums
- Dan Miller – guitar; piano on "Careful What You Pack"
- Danny Weinkauf – bass guitar

Additional musicians

- Mauro Refosco – percussion (track 9)
- Justin Meldal-Johnsen – acoustic bass guitar (9)
- Dan Levine – trombone (9, 10)
- Stan Harrison – saxophone (9, 10)
- Jim O'Connor – trumpet (9, 10)
- Lyle Workman – guitar (6, 9)
- Sharon Jones – vocals (10)

Production

- They Might Be Giants – producers (except 3, 6, 9, 10, 12)
- Patrick Dillett – producer (except 3, 6, 9, 10, 12), engineer
- The Dust Brothers – producers (2, 3, 6, 7, 9, 10, 12)
- UE Nastasi – mastering
- Yuki Takahashi – engineer
- Greg Thompson – engineer
- Jon Altschuler – engineer
- Marcel Dzama – artwork, costumes, photography

== Reception ==
Professional ratings
Aggregate scores
Source	Rating
Metacritic	(73/100)
Review scores
Source	Rating
Allmusic	3.5/5 stars
The A.V. Club	B
IGN	(8.5/10)
The Music Box	3/5 stars
Now	4/5 stars
Pitchfork Media	(5.3/10)
PopMatters	7/10 stars
Robert Christgau	(choice cut)
Spin	(6/10)
Stylus	B+

The album reached #9 on the Billboard Top Digital Albums chart.
