= Here Comes Science =

2009 studio album by They Might Be Giants

Studio album by They Might Be Giants
- Released: September 1, 2009
- Recorded: 2000 ("What Is a Shooting Star?"), 2004 ("The Bloodmobile"), 2007 ("How Many Planets?", "Roy G. Biv"), Mid-2008 – February 2009
- Studios: Kampo Studios, Manhattan, New York County, New York, United States, Collyer Brothers Studio, Brooklyn, Kings County, New York, United States, The Governor's Bluff, Sullivan County, United States, Coyote Studio, Brooklyn, Kings County, New York, United States
- Genres: Children's, educational
- Length: 39:46
- Label: Idlewild/Disney
- Producers: They Might Be Giants, Pat Dillett

They Might Be Giants chronology
Here Come the 123s (2008)	Here Comes Science (2009)	Join Us (2011)

Professional ratings
Aggregate scores
Source	Rating
Metacritic	66/100
Review scores
Source	Rating
About.com	5/5 stars
AllMusic	4/5 stars
The A.V. Club	B+
Billboard	(favorable)
PopMatters	8/10 stars
Robert Christgau	(3-star Honorable Mention)
Uncut	2/5 stars
Under the Radar	6/10 stars
Wired	(favorable)
Zooglobble	(favorable)

Here Comes Science is the fourth children's album and fourteenth studio album by American alternative rock band They Might Be Giants. It was packaged as a CD/DVD set. The album is science-themed, and is the third in their line of educational albums, following Here Come the ABCs (2005) and Here Come the 123s (2008). It was nominated for the "Best Musical Album for Children" Grammy.

"I Am a Paleontologist" was featured in a Payless ShoeSource commercial featuring kids inside a dinosaur museum.

== Track listing ==
The CD track listing is the same as the DVD track listing, with the exception of the bonus track "Waves", which is absent from the DVD.

All tracks are written by They Might Be Giants, except where noted.

No.	Title	Writer(s)	Length
1.	"Science Is Real"		1:54
2.	"Meet the Elements"		3:19
3.	"I Am a Paleontologist"	Danny Weinkauf	2:32
4.	"The Bloodmobile"		2:21
5.	"Electric Car" (with Robin Goldwasser)		3:22
6.	"My Brother the Ape"		3:06
7.	"What Is a Shooting Star?"	Louis Singer, Hy Zaret	1:38
8.	"How Many Planets?"		1:56
9.	"Why Does the Sun Shine?"	Singer, Zaret	2:36
10.	"Why Does the Sun Really Shine?"		1:51
11.	"Roy G. Biv"		2:07
12.	"Put It to the Test"		1:41
13.	"Photosynthesis"		1:59
14.	"Cells"		2:41
15.	"Speed and Velocity"	Marty Beller	1:48
16.	"Computer Assisted Design"		0:54
17.	"Solid Liquid Gas"		1:28
18.	"Here Comes Science"		0:16
19.	"The Ballad of Davy Crockett (in Outer Space)"	Tom W. Blackburn, George Bruns	2:17
Total length:			39:46

Amazon MP3 edition
No.	Title	Writer(s)	Length
20.	"Waves"	They Might Be Giants	1:32
Total length:			41:18

== Personnel ==
They Might Be Giants

- John Linnell – vocals, keyboard
- John Flansburgh – vocals, guitar
- Marty Beller – drums
- Danny Weinkauf – bass, vocals (3)
- Dan Miller – guitar

Additional musicians

- Robin Goldwasser – additional vocals (4, 5, 8, 13)
- Hannah & Niffer Levine – additional vocals (16)
- Lena & Kai Weinkauf – additional vocals (3)
- Dan Levine – trombone, bass trombone, arrangement, alto horn, euphonium
- Stan Harrison – tenor saxophone, baritone saxophone, flute
- Curt Ramm – trumpet, flugelhorn, trumpet solo
- Michael Leonhart – trumpet, flugelhorn, mellophone
- Jonathan Levine – piccolo, alto flute, alto saxophone, bass clarinet
