= Coraline (soundtrack) =

Coraline (Original Motion Picture Soundtrack)

Soundtrack album by Bruno Coulais
- Released: February 3, 2009
- Recorded: 2008–2009
- Studios: Les Studios de la Seine, Paris; Solid Sound Studio, Cincinnati, Ohio; Hungarian National Radio Studios, Budapest; Skywalker Sound, Los Angeles, California
- Genre: Film score
- Length: 59:31
- Label: Milan Records
- Producers: Bruno Coulais; Bruno Letort

Bruno Coulais chronology
Agathe Cléry (2008)	Coraline (2009)	The Secret of Kells (2009)

Coraline (Original Motion Picture Soundtrack) is the soundtrack to the 2009 stop-motion animated dark fantasy horror film Coraline directed by Henry Selick and produced by the animation studio Laika, in their maiden feature film. The album featured the original score composed by Bruno Coulais, who worked on the film for over a year, and was recorded at several places including Paris, Budapest, Los Angeles and Cincinnati. Coulais had developed the themes based on the visual style and used variety of instruments and orchestral and choir portions, to create strange sounds.

The soundtrack was released by Milan Records on February 3, 2009, featuring 32 tracks; also included are three songs specifically written for the film, with an original song performed by the alternative rock band They Might Be Giants, who were supposed to contribute several original songs for the film, before they were excluded. Coulais' score received critical acclaim and won the Annie Award for Best Music in an Animated Feature Production in 2010.

In 2014, Mondo published the film's soundtrack in vinyl LP formats as a "limited edition" on April 15, 2014, along with the score for another Laika film ParaNorman (2012), composed by Jon Brion. A second release was later issued on November 11, 2016.

== Development ==
Bruno Coulais provided the musical score, in his maiden American animated feature film. A year before the production began, Selick tried several types of music as temp tracks for the film and looked on Coulais' score for Microcosmos (1996) and Winged Migration (2001) and found that score worked well, which resulted in his inclusion. Coulais appreciated the director's works such as The Nightmare Before Christmas (1993) and acknowledged that since the beginning of the film, he knew the necessary sounds he wanted, but let have him creative freedom to score the film.

Coulais met Selick in Los Angeles and had started to create the themes and melodies based on the animatics he provided for the film, and he would supervise the film's production, so that he could change the orchestrations suiting the narrative and visual style; he did twice or thrice, when he started scoring the film at Paris. According to Coulais, "there is an important correspondence between the lighting and the tonalities of the orchestration". About approaching the music for Coraline, Coulais described it as:

"For me [when scoring a film], the story is not very important – it's not so interesting to say the same thing with the music as the story. So, I think in Coraline the music is sometimes “behind the wall,” like ghosts that haunt the movie. It was very interesting to have the music evolve. In it beginning it sounds very quiet and realistic because it's a realistic world. And little by little the music becomes quite scary by the end of the movie."

Some of the instruments he used included harp, and huge orchestral pieces, which consisted of a string quarter, ethnic instruments and synthesizers becoming a mix of those, along with vocal choir. He used "strange instruments" such as the waterphone (Note: it as an atonal acoustic metal percussion instrument, which Coulais described it as you put water on a kind of basin with a tube and a bowl and play notes on it, to create a "strange, beautiful, very deep sound".) for the sequences with the Other Mother and the marching band of the mice circus, where he used toys and Chinese instruments along with traditional marching band instruments, trying it to be the scale of a mice. Coulais wanted to make his own orchestration, depending on the density of the sequence, which he admitted it:

"...I have a big orchestra, especially the string [section]. I tried to do something very special with the strings so there are a lot of glissandi and microtonalities. I expect the audience to feel that the ground is not so stable. And with the children's choir there are a lot of contrapuntal voices. I think when you are very young, it's the age of terror, of fear, so I think in movies when you use something very close to a childhood you create a fear, and a fantasy."

The recording began with the Children's Choir of Nice performing the score in Paris, and later he would record the soloists and the Hungarian Symphony Orchestra at Budapest. Later, he mixed the score at Skywalker Sound in Los Angeles.

== Songs ==
In addition to the original score, the film also featured original songs—"Sirens of the Sea" performed by Michele Mariana, "Other Father Song" performed by John Linnell, co-founder of the alternative rock band They Might Be Giants (who were credited as the performer), "Dreaming" by Teri Hatcher and The Children's Choir of Nice and "Nellie Jean" by Kent Melton. They Might Be Giants had created more music for the film, but their contributions were cut in the production process, to which the band's member John Flansburgh, admitted that "It was a strange experience. They basically wanted the music to be more creepy. It was unfortunate–we did a lot of sort of preliminary work, there were a lot of false starts, and we never really found a rhythm to work with them. I guess there's one of our songs in the movie momentarily, but it's sort of unfortunate." The song "Careful What You Pack" was written specifically for the film, but the band included it in their studio album The Else (2007). Despite their exclusion, Selick however loved their contributions to the film.

== Track listing ==
No.	Title	Performer(s)	Length
1.	"End Credits"	Bruno Coulais; The Children's Choir Of Nice	1:54
2.	"Dreaming"	Bernard Paganotti; Coulais; Hungarian Symphony Orchestra; Laurent Petitgirard; Teri Hatcher; Children's Choir Of Nice	2:20
3.	"Installation"	Mathilde Pellegrini; Coulais; Hungarian Symphony; Petitgirard; Hélène Breschand; Children's Choir Of Nice	2:28
4.	"Wybie"	Coulais; Hungarian Symphony; Petitgirard; Breschand	2:07
5.	"Exploration"	Pellegrini; Coulais; Hungarian Symphony; Petitgirard; Breschand	2:01
6.	"Other Father Song"	They Might Be Giants	0:28
7.	"The Supper"	Paganotti; Coulais; Hungarian Symphony; Petitgirard; Children's Choir Of Nice	1:31
8.	"Bobinsky"	Coulais; Hungarian Symphony; Petitgirard; Breschand	2:23
9.	"Fantastic Garden"	Paganotti; Coulais; Hungarian Symphony; Petitgirard; Children's Choir Of Nice; Choir Of The Hungarian National Radio	1:34
10.	"Coraline Fly"	Coulais; Hungarian Symphony; Petitgirard	0:24
11.	"Trap For The Mices"	Children's Choir Of Nice; Coulais; Hungarian Symphony; Petitgirard; Breschand	1:34
12.	"Mice Circus"	Coulais; Hungarian Symphony; Petitgirard	1:27
13.	"Dreams Are Dangerous"	Coulais; Breschand	1:27
14.	"Sirens Of The Sea"	Paganotti; Coulais; Michele Mariana	1:38
15.	"In The Bed"	Coulais; Hungarian Symphony; Petitgirard; Breschand	1:54
16.	"Spink And Forcible"	Coulais; Hungarian Symphony; Petitgirard; Paganotti	0:33
17.	"It Was Fantastic"	Coulais; Hungarian Symphony; Petitgirard	2:10
18.	"Ghost Children"	Coulais; Hungarian Symphony; Petitgirard; Children's Choir Of Nice	1:28
19.	"Let's Go"	Coulais; Hungarian Symphony; Petitgirard; Hungarian National Radio	1:09
20.	"Playing Piano"	Coulais; Hungarian Symphony; Petitgirard; Paganotti	2:48
21.	"Wybie That Talks"	Coulais; Hungarian Symphony; Petitgirard	2:09
22.	"Cocobeetles"	Coulais; Hungarian Symphony; Petitgirard; Pellegrini	1:39
23.	"Alone"	Coulais; Hungarian Symphony; Petitgirard; Breschand	0:52
24.	"Dangerous"	Coulais; Hungarian Symphony; Petitgirard; Breschand	2:23
25.	"Reunion"	Coulais; Breschand	1:10
26.	"Coraline Despair"	Coulais; Hungarian Symphony; Petitgirard; Children's Choir Of Nice; Hungarian National Radio	1:27
27.	"The Theater"	Coulais; Hungarian Symphony; Petitgirard; Mariana	1:33
28.	"The Famous Mister B"	Coulais	2:23
29.	"You Know I Love You"	Coulais; Hungarian Symphony; Petitgirard; Christophe Grindel; Hungarian National Radio	4:27
30.	"Mechanical Lullaby"	Paganotti; Coulais; Hungarian Symphony; Petitgirard; Hatcher; Children's Choir Of Nice	2:24
31.	"The Hand"	Coulais; Hungarian Symphony; Petitgirard	3:14
32.	"The Party"	Pellegrini; Coulais; Hungarian Symphony; Petitgirard; Breschand; Children's Choir Of Nice	2:32
Total length:			59:31

== Reception ==
Music critic Jonathan Broxton commented "Coulais’ score, which may appeal more to admirers of the art of film music itself, who can appreciate the detail of unusual orchestration or intricate compositional techniques, and less to those who simply want to listen to something nice; as such, the score's high ranking comes from the fact that I fall into the former camp." Filmtracks.com wrote "In an industry plagued by stock, anonymous film scores, Coraline is a frightfully engaging pleasure, but its vast technical prowess can be surprisingly alienating and borderline nightmarish. In other words, perfect for this production."

Jason Heinzel of The Holland Sentinel complimented the musical score, saying "The music was beautifully arranged and produced by Bruno Coulais and, as a special treat, there is a song by the ‘Other Father’ that is sung and produced by “They Might Be Giants.” Coulais’ orchestra creates a wonderful atmosphere and spooky tone for the film." Mark Morton of AllMusic wrote "Coraline is like a Cirque du Soleil performance for the ears. Zipping through a concoction of world music, new Age, classical, and bebop, Coulais draws comparisons to Danny Elfman's frenzied musical cocktails, but with an old-world elegance."

Australian singer-songwriter Cody Jon, complimented the music for Coraline as "one of his favourite soundtracks" while praising the film.

== Awards and nominations ==
Awards and nominations
Award	Category	Recipient(s)	Result
Annie Awards	Best Music in an Animated Feature Production	Bruno Coulais	Won
International Film Music Critics Association	Best Original Score for an Animated Film	Bruno Coulais	Nominated
