= State Songs =

Studio album by John Linnell
- Released: October 26, 1999
- Recorded: 1994, 1999
- Genres: Pop rock, avant-pop
- Length: 45:11
- Label: Rounder / Zoë
- Producer: John Linnell

John Linnell chronology
House of Mayors (1996)	State Songs (1999)

State Songs is a concept album released by John Linnell in 1999. It was his third solo project and first full solo album. It consists of tracks that are named after, and are at least partially inspired by, 15 of the 50 U.S. states. The album is surrealist in nature. The album has received positive reviews from critics and peaked No. 18 on the CMJ 200 chart.

"Montana" was released as the single for the album. It was pressed by Erika Records. The single also featured the non-album track "Louisiana" as the B-side. Originally, "South Carolina" was the album's single, but the track was too long for the grooves to fit on the record that resembled the shape of the contiguous United States.

== Recording ==
State Songs originally existed as a short EP that John Linnell released through the Hello Recording Club. The carousel organ is featured in four tracks. Linnell has stated that the organ was used to add variety among the standard human musicians. Two different band organs are featured on the album. The paper rolls for the organs were cut by Bob Stuhmer and Max Hurley respectively, and adjusted by Linnell. Linnell used a Gretsch accordion in recording the album.

== Track listing ==
No.	Title	Length
1.	"Illinois"	1:23
2.	"The Songs of the 50 States"	2:24
3.	"West Virginia"	3:32
4.	"South Carolina"	3:46
5.	"Idaho"	2:38
6.	"Montana"	3:14
7.	"Pennsylvania"	1:02
8.	"Utah"	2:34
9.	"Arkansas"	3:27
10.	"Iowa"	2:54
11.	"Mississippi"	2:16
12.	"Maine"	2:07
13.	"Oregon"	1:49
14.	"Michigan"	1:14
15.	"New Hampshire"	2:50
16.	"Nevada"	7:58 (Note: The song "Nevada" is only 34 seconds long; the rest of the track is a recording of an increasingly distant marching band.)
Total length:		45:11

== Personnel ==
- John Linnell – vocals, accordion, alto saxophone, bass clarinet, DustBuster, guitar, organ, piano, programming, synthesizers

The Statesmen

- Mark Donato – drums
- Mark Lerner – bass guitar
- Dan Miller – guitar
- Bob Stuhmer – carousel organ

Additional musicians

- Kate Dennis – French horn
- Brian Doherty – additional drums
- Mark Feldman – violin
- Dan Hickey – additional drums
- Jay Sherman-Godfrey – additional guitar
- Danny Weinkauf – additional bass

Production

- Albert Caiati – recording
- Patrick Dillett – mixing
- Barbara Glauber – artwork
- John Linnell – producer

== Reception ==
Professional ratings
Review scores
Source	Rating
AllMusic	4/5 stars
Robert Christgau	(2-star Honorable Mention)

State Songs received positive reviews from critics. Matthew Springer, writing for AllMusic, praised the album's surrealism and eclecticism. Music critic Robert Christgau cited "The Songs of the 50 States" and "New Hampshire" as highlights from the album.

The album spent four weeks on the CMJ 200 chart, peaking at No. 18.
