= Come as You Are: The Story of Nirvana =

Biography by Michael Azerrad

- First edition cover
- Author: Michael Azerrad
- Language: English
- Subject: Biography
- Publisher: Doubleday
- Publication date: October 1993
- Publication place: United States
- Media type: Print (paperback)
- Pages: 344
- ISBN: 0-385-47199-8

Come as You Are: The Story of Nirvana is a 1993 biography of the American rock band Nirvana written by music journalist Michael Azerrad. It was written before the suicide of band leader Kurt Cobain. Azerrad met with the members of the band and conducted extensive interviews about the band and its members' histories.

== Writing and release ==
In late 1992, Azerrad was contacted by Cobain and his wife Courtney Love, who asked him to write a book about Nirvana. Over the next six months, Azerrad conducted interviews and research for the book in Seattle area. Following the completion of the book, Doubleday requested that Azerrad allow Cobain to read the book out of courtesy; Cobain was allowed to read the manuscript before publication, but was not allowed to change any of its content apart from correcting minor factual errors. Azerrad and Cobain met at the Warwick Hotel in Seattle over the course of three days to review the manuscript. Cobain enthusiastically approved of Azerrad's work, telling him "That's the best rock book I've ever read" once he had finished reading it. Doubleday scheduled the book's release for October to coincide with the release of Nirvana's third album In Utero.

Following Cobain's death, Azerrad wrote a new final chapter for the second printing, released in 1994.

Radio & Records reported in May 1994 that Cobain's family would not let the book's publisher, Doubleday, sell the movie rights to the book. In June 1994, Gavin Report reported that Azerrad had turned down several offers to sell film rights to his book.

Azerrad worked with filmmaker AJ Schnack to use the 25 hours of audio interviews that Azerrad had conducted with Cobain for the book as the basis for a documentary on Cobain's life. Titled Kurt Cobain: About a Son, the movie debuted at festivals in 2006.

The 30th Anniversary Deluxe edition, The Amplified Come As You Are: The Story of Nirvana, was released on October 24, 2023. Called "a book within a book", this edition is nearly double the length of the original biography. It includes hundreds of new essays and extensive annotations.

== Critical reception ==
In a review for Billboard by Chris Morris, he said that "A wizardly combination of smart journalism and intelligent analysis, "Come As You Are" is as good as rock bios get". Entertainment Weekly gave the book an 'A' rating, writing that it "delivers the goods". People called it "a fascinating study of Cobain".
