= Gigantic (A Tale of Two Johns) =

2003 documentary film

- Directed by: AJ Schnack
- Produced by: Shirley Moyers
- Cinematography: Yon Thomas
- Edited by: Jason Kool, Alisa Lipsitt
- Distributed by: Cowboy Pictures, Plexifilm (USA)
- Release date: March 10, 2003
- Running time: 102 minutes
- Language: English

Gigantic (A Tale of Two Johns) is a documentary film directed by AJ Schnack profiling American alternative rock band They Might Be Giants. It first premiered at the South by Southwest Film Festival in 2002 and was released in theaters by Cowboy Pictures, and on DVD by Plexifilm in 2003.

== Contents ==
The documentary is 102 minutes long and stars They Might Be Giants band members John Linnell and John Flansburgh as they discuss their band. The film features interviews with Frank Black, Sarah Vowell, Dave Eggers, Mark Hoppus, and others. The DVD includes bonus features such as music videos, vintage live performances, and more.

== Reception ==
Gigantic (A Tale of Two Johns) was given a critic approval of 79% on the Tomatometer with 19 ratings being called "Fresh". The film has a 64 Metascore on review aggregator Metacritic from 19 reviews by critics, being "generally favorable".
