= Michael Azerrad =

American music journalist

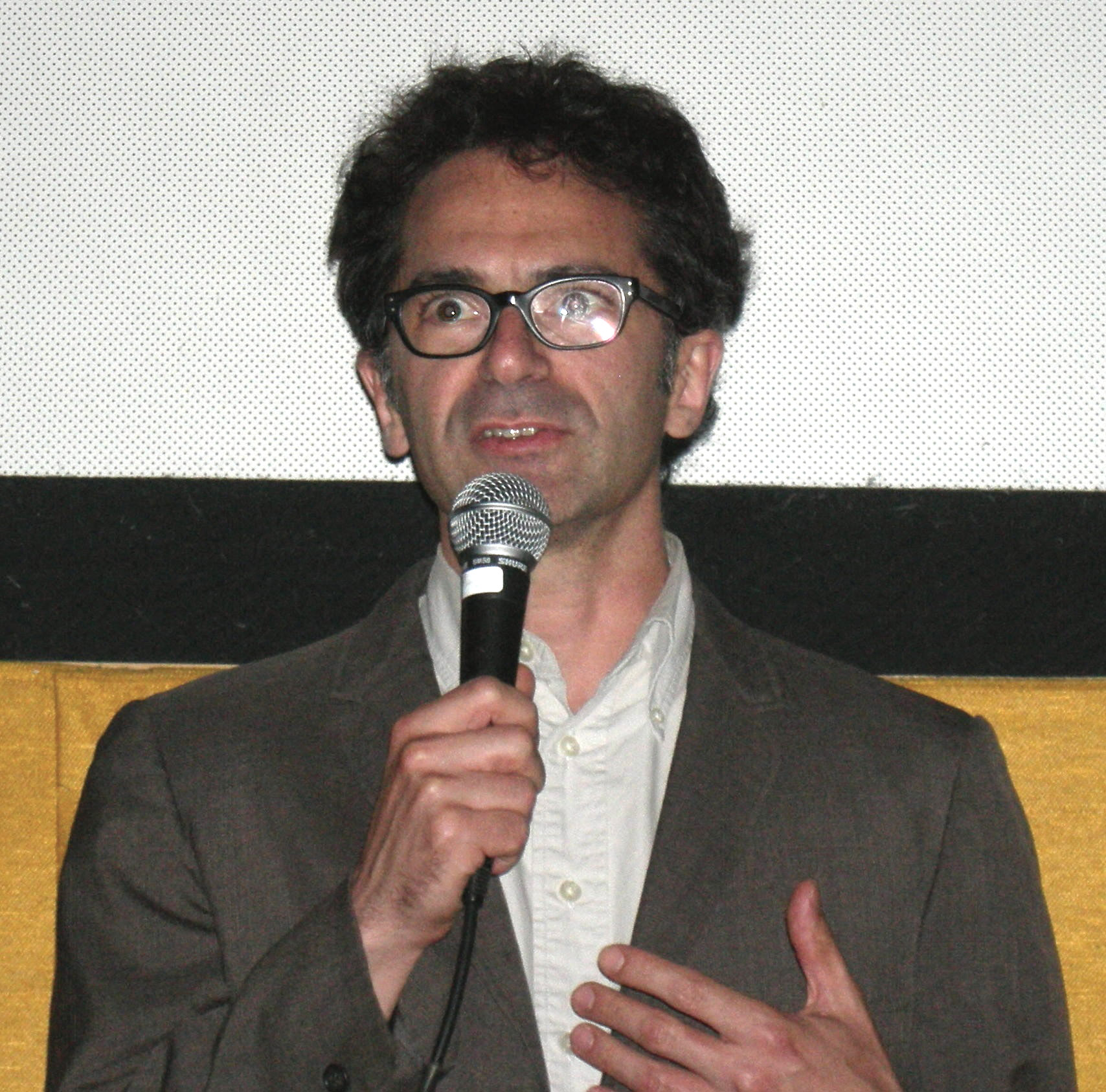
- Azerrad at the Seattle International Film Festival in 2007, after a screening of his film Kurt Cobain: About a Son
- Education: Columbia University (BA)
- Occupations: Author, music journalist, editor, musician
- Notable work: Come as You Are: The Story of Nirvana; Our Band Could Be Your Life

Michael Azerrad is an American author, music journalist, editor, and musician. As a graduate of Columbia University, he has written for publications such as Spin, Rolling Stone, and The New York Times. Azerrad's 1993 biography Come as You Are: The Story of Nirvana was named by Q as one of the 50 greatest rock books ever written. His 2001 book Our Band Could Be Your Life, a collection of profiles on prominent indie rock bands, received similar critical acclaim.

== Early life ==
Azerrad grew up in the New York City area and received his BA degree from Columbia College in 1983. His father was an art director at NBC, and his mother a senior consultant at Art and Technology, a computer consulting firm in San Francisco. During his college years, he was both a roommate and a bandmate of keyboard virtuoso Marc Capelle (who later went on to become a member of American Music Club.) May 21, 1988 he married Julia Barnett Just.

== Music journalism ==
After college, Azerrad played drums in various small bands while pursuing a career in music journalism. Besides writing features for Spin, Musician and Details, and a stint at MTV News from 1987 through 1992, Azerrad wrote several hundred pieces for Rolling Stone from 1987 through 1993, including cover stories on the B-52's and Nirvana, and was eventually named contributing editor. He has since written major features for The New Yorker, Mojo, Italian GQ and the New York Times, as well as cover stories for Spin and Revolver.

In 1993, Doubleday Books published Azerrad's definitive, best-selling biography of Nirvana, Come as You Are: The Story of Nirvana, which appeared six months before bandleader Kurt Cobain died of a self-inflicted gunshot wound. Azerrad spent many months interviewing the band members and their friends, relatives and associates, and Cobain and the other members of the band shared a wide variety of archival materials with him, many of which are reproduced in the book. In 2000, Q magazine named it one of the 50 greatest rock books ever written.

His subsequent book, Our Band Could Be Your Life (Little, Brown and Company, 2001), was a collection of profiles of thirteen prominent indie rock bands of the 1980s and early 1990s, including Sonic Youth, Black Flag, Minutemen and the Replacements. In 2006 The Guardian rated the book as one of the 50 best music books ever written. In 2009, Paste magazine named it one of the 12 best music books of the decade; the Los Angeles Times listed it as one of "46 Essential Rock Reads" and in 2011 Pitchfork listed the book in "Words and Music: Our 60 Favorite Music Books."

Azerrad wrote liner notes for various albums and DVDs by artists including: Paul McCartney, Miles Davis, Gang of Four, Violent Femmes, Screaming Trees, Guided by Voices, Meat Puppets, the Jesus Lizard, the B-52's, the live comedy series Invite Them Up and the 1991 cult TV series Fishing with John. He has spoken at various music festivals and conventions, including SXSW (USA), CMJ (USA), Insound (Australia), by:Larm (Norway), Orloff 5 (Brazil), and the Incubate Festival (the Netherlands).

In 2006, Azerrad co-produced an award-winning documentary about Kurt Cobain, Kurt Cobain About a Son. He is the editor of See a Little Light, the autobiography of former Hüsker Dü and Sugar leader Bob Mould, published by Little, Brown in June 2011.

During 2008/2009 Kingston, UK band Tubelord used Azerrad's name in their single "I Am Azerrad," which includes the line "I kill today, I'll kill you Azerrad," prompting Azerrad to write a humorous essay about the experience for Spin magazine.

== Music career ==
Azerrad was a member of now-defunct indie band the King of France, whose self-titled debut album was released in 2004. In 2005, he became an original member of Reprise Records recording artists the LeeVees. In summer 2009, he became a founding member of children's music band the Macaroons, whose debut album, Let's Go Coconuts, was released by JDub Records in spring 2010.
