= Dan Miller (guitarist) =

American musician, songwriter, and composer (born 1967)

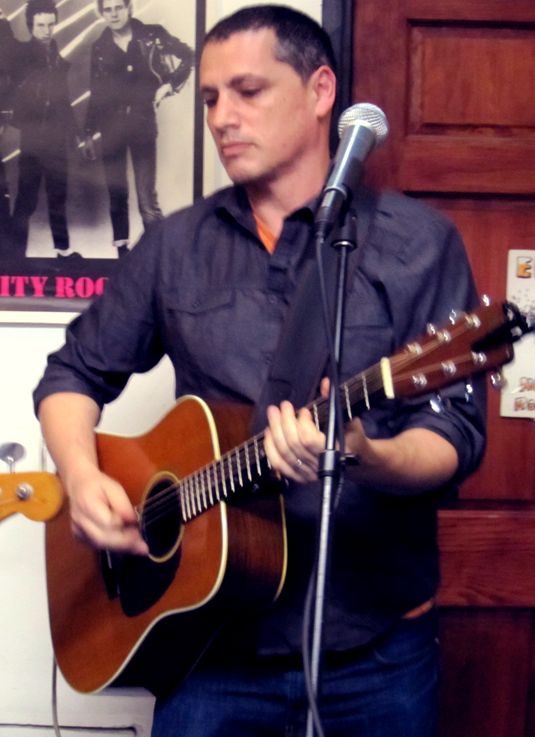
- Miller performing in 2013

Background information
- Born: Daniel Adam Miller; October 3, 1967 (age 58)
- Origin: Rochester, New York, US
- Genres: Alternative rock
- Occupations: Musician, songwriter, composer
- Instruments: Guitar, keyboards, vocals
- Years active: 1990s–present
- Labels: Disney Sound, Idlewild Recordings, Rounder Records, Let's Get It!, Republic Records, NSO Media, Cleopatra Records
- Spouse: Annette Berry (m. 2008)

Daniel Adam Miller (born October 3, 1967) is an American musician, songwriter, and composer. He is the lead guitarist of American alternative rock band They Might Be Giants.

== Music career ==
Miller grew up in Rochester, New York. He graduated from Brandeis University and attended Berklee College of Music. Prior to joining They Might Be Giants, he performed with the groups Edith O and Lincoln. Having left Lincoln for personal reasons in 1998, he was contacted by John Flansburgh, who offered him a spot as lead guitarist for They Might Be Giants' Fall 1998 tour. He has also toured with John Flansburgh as Mono Puff's guitarist in the late 1990s and played on bandmate John Linnell's State Songs tour.

Miller sings backup and some lead during live performances. He also occasionally plays keyboards when Linnell is playing accordion or woodwinds. Miller co-wrote the song "Infinity" with Robert Sharenow on They Might Be Giants' second children's album, Here Come the 123s. He is also credited on Jonathan Coulton's album Artificial Heart.

Miller has also collaborated with actor William Shatner, producing and co-writing three albums: Bill (2021), So Fragile, So Blue (2024), and the children's album Where Will the Animals Sleep? (2024).

== Personal life ==
On June 21, 2008, Miller married Annette Berry, a graphic artist and creative director based in Manhattan. Berry is credited with designing They Might Be Giants' 1999 studio album Long Tall Weekend.

== Discography ==
=== As producer and co-writer ===
Year	Artist	Album	Label	Notes
2021	William Shatner	Bill	Let's Get It! / Republic Records	Producer, co-writer
2024	William Shatner	So Fragile, So Blue	NSO Media	Producer, arranger; recorded live with the National Symphony Orchestra
2024	William Shatner	Where Will the Animals Sleep?	Cleopatra Records	Producer, co-writer; children's album; peaked at #5 on the Billboard Kids Albums chart

== Soundtracks ==
=== Film/Documentary ===
Year	Title	Director(s)
2010	The Carrier	Maggie Betts
2011	Rhag	Doug Walker
2011	This Must Be the Place	Paolo Sorrentino
2012	The Perfect Victim	Elizabeth Rohrbaugh
2016	Death by a Thousand Cuts	Jake Kheel, Juan Mejia Botero
2018	Armed with Faith	Asad Faruqi, Geeta Gandbhir
2019	Hungry to Learn	Geeta Gandbhir

=== Television ===
Year	Title	Network	Role
2000–1	Malcolm in the Middle	FOX	Musician: Guitar
2007–9	Jon & Kate Plus 8	Discovery Network	Composer
2008–11	Manhunters: Fugitive Task Force	A&E Networks	Composer: Theme and Incidental Music
2011	The Substitute	MTV Networks	
2014	Gracepoint	FX Networks	Music Co-Producer
2021	American Rust (Season 1)	Showtime	Composer, Score Producer
2024	American Rust (Season 2)	Amazon	Composer, Score Producer

== Awards ==
Year	Award	Category	Project	Result	Ref.
2009	Grammy Award	Best Musical Album for Children	Here Come the 123s	Won	
2011	Grammy Award	Best Musical Album for Children	Here Comes Science	Nominated	
