= Kurt Cobain: About a Son =

- Theatrical release poster
- Directed by: AJ Schnack
- Produced by: Ravi Anne
- Starring: Kurt Cobain
- Narrated by: Kurt Cobain
- Cinematography: Wyatt Troll
- Edited by: AJ Schnack
- Music by: Steve Fisk; Ben Gibbard
- Distributed by: Balcony Releasing
- Release dates: September 10, 2006 (Toronto); October 3, 2007
- Running time: 97 minutes
- Country: United States
- Language: English

Kurt Cobain: About a Son is a 2006 American documentary film about American rock musician Kurt Cobain, directed by AJ Schnack and produced by Sidetrack Films. It consists of excerpts from the audio recordings journalist Michael Azerrad made of the interviews he conducted with Cobain for the book Come as You Are: The Story of Nirvana, set over ambient cinematography of the places in Washington where Cobain lived, played and worked: Aberdeen, Olympia, and Seattle.

The film debuted at the 2006 Toronto International Film Festival and played at numerous other film festivals, and it was nominated for the Truer Than Fiction Award at the 22nd Independent Spirit Awards. The DVD release of the film, which was released by Shout! Factory in February 2008, includes interviews with and commentary by Azerrad and Schnack. Shout! Factory also released the film on Blu-ray on October 6, 2009.

== Soundtrack ==
1. Steve Fisk & Benjamin Gibbard – Overture
2. "Motorcycle Song" – Arlo Guthrie
3. "It's Late" – Queen
4. "Downed" – Cheap Trick
5. "Eye Flys" – Melvins
6. Audio: Punk Rock
7. "My Family's a Little Weird" – MDC
8. "Banned in D.C." – Bad Brains
9. "Up Around the Bend" – Creedence Clearwater Revival
10. "Kerosene" – Big Black
11. "Put Some Sugar on It" – Half Japanese
12. "Include Me Out" – Young Marble Giants
13. "Round Two" – Pasties
14. "Son of a Gun" – The Vaselines
15. "Graveyard" – Butthole Surfers
16. Audio: Hardcore Was Dead
17. "Owner's Lament" – Scratch Acid
18. "Iris" – The Breeders
19. "Touch Me I'm Sick" – Mudhoney
20. Audio: Car Radio
21. "The Passenger" – Iggy Pop
22. "Star Sign" – Teenage Fanclub
23. "The Bourgeois Blues" – Lead Belly
24. "New Orleans Instrumental No. 1" – R.E.M.
25. Audio: The Limelight
26. "The Man Who Sold the World" – David Bowie
27. "Museum" – Mark Lanegan
28. "Indian Summer" – Ben Gibbard

== Accolades ==
- Best Documentary – 2007 San Diego Film Festival
