= Hello CD of the Month Club =

American record label

- Founded: 1993
- Founder: John Flansburgh; Marjorie Galen
- Defunct: 1996
- Status: Inactive
- Genre: Alternative rock, alternative country, experimental rock
- Country of origin: United States
- Location: Palisades, New York

The Hello CD of the Month Club, also known as the Hello Recording Club or simply Hello, was a subscription-only record company that operated from 1993 to 1996. Hello was organized by John Flansburgh of American alternative rock band They Might Be Giants and Marjorie Galen. Members of Hello received monthly issues of CD extended plays, each containing four or five songs by a particular artist. These EPs were exclusive to Hello.

== History ==
John Flansburgh founded the Hello CD of the Month Club with Marjorie Galen in 1993 as a way to provide an outlet for his solo material. Hello issued four Mono Puff releases, as well as two EPs by Flansburgh's bandmate John Linnell, while also providing a platform for both established musicians signed to other labels and new artists. Flansburgh and Galen originally intended Hello to be a standard independent label. However, this was not financially plausible, so Hello adopted a subscription model instead. Although Flansburgh and Galen had to seek out artists for Hello's first year of operation, by 1994, musicians were contacting the label themselves. In its first year, the label faced difficulties with understaffing.

Flansburgh has stated that the purpose of Hello was to produce and distribute music projects cheaply for the artist and the consumer. Hello only produced as many discs as the number of subscribers. It did not achieve outstanding financial success; however, Flansburgh reported that the label was in the black. Proceeds from They Might Be Giants' 1985 Demo Tape, an optional addition to 1994 subscriptions, were donated to the People With AIDS Coalition.

The label dissolved after its 1996 subscription year due to a level of demand that the small label could no longer service. Some members did not receive the final 1996 releases until May 1997. For a brief time afterward, the Hello back catalogue was still available for purchase. Over the span of Hello's existence, it issued works from 34 different artists.

== Releases ==
Hello produced 39 EPs over four years, as well as two promotional samplers, a promotional copy of a full-length Mono Puff album, and one compilation of original material by various artists. Hello also issued a live sampler from They Might Be Giants, and reissued their 1985 Demo Tape on cassette.

=== 1993 ===
Artist	Title	Format	Type	Month	Notes
Brian Dewan	Brian Dewan	CD	EP	March	First release
Nelories	The Nelories	CD	EP	April	
Flat Old World	Flat Old World	CD	EP	May	Included bonus cassette
They Might Be Giants	1985 Demo Tape	Cassette	Demo	May	Bonus reissue cassette sent with the May EP for an additional $5
Kurt Hoffman's Band of Weeds	Kurt Hoffman's Band of Weeds	CD	EP	June	
Eugene Chadbourne	Eugene Chadbourne	CD	EP	July	
The Residents	Prelude to "The Teds"	CD	EP	August	Later released as part of "Our Poor, Our Tired, Our Huddled Masses" and the pREServed edition of Gingerbread Man
Hello The Band	Hello The Band	CD	EP	September	
Duplex Halloween Planet	Duplex Halloween Planet	CD	EP	October	
Frank Black	Frank Black	CD	EP	November	
The Minus 5	Hello EP	CD	EP	December	

=== 1994 ===
Artist	Title	Format	Type	Month	Notes
Various Artists	Hello 1993 Sampler	CD	Promo	N/A	Included selections from 1993 catalogues
Various Artists	A Hello CD of the Month Club Sampler	CD	Promo	N/A	Included selections from 1993, 1994, and 1995 catalogues
Portastatic	Portastatic	CD	EP	February	
Drink Me	Five Songs	CD	EP	March	
The Jickets	The Jickets	CD	EP	April	
Peter Stampfel	Peter Stampfel	CD	EP	May	
John Linnell	State Songs	CD	EP	June	Later expanded to a full album
Brian Dewan	Brian Dewan	CD	EP	September	
Spanish Fly	Insert Tongue Here	CD	EP	October	
Andy Partridge	Andy Partridge	CD	EP	November	
Chaz and the Motorbikes	Chaz and the Motorbikes	CD	EP	December	Included bonus CD
They Might Be Giants	Live!! New York City 10/14/94	CD	Live	December	Elektra Records promotional CD sent with December EP

=== 1995 ===
Artist	Title	Format	Type	Month	Notes
John Flansburgh's Mono Puff	John Flansburgh's Mono Puff	CD	EP	March	
My Dad is Dead	My Dad is Dead	CD	EP	April	
Alaska	Alaska	CD	EP	May	
Spondee	Spondee	CD	EP	June	
Freedy Johnston	Freedy Johnston	CD	EP	July	
The Coctails	The Coctails	CD	EP	August	
Philco Bendyx	Philco Bendyx	CD	EP	September	
Amy Allison and The Maudlins	Amy Allison and The Maudlins	CD	EP	October	
Dave Schramm	Dave Schramm	CD	EP	November	
Various Artists	Hello Family Santa Special	CD	Compilation	December	Christmas-themed compilation

=== 1996 ===
Artist	Title	Format	Type	Month	Notes
The Gothic Archies	Looming in the Gloom	CD	EP	March	
Will Rigby	Will Rigby	CD	EP	April	
Mono Puff	Unsupervised	CD	Album	May	Special advance promo; not commercially available
Soul Coughing	Soul Coughing	CD	EP	June	
Laura Cantrell	Laura Cantrell	CD	EP	July	Later reissued independently
John Linnell	House of Mayors	CD	EP	August	
Hal Sirowitz	Hal Sirowitz	CD	EP	September	
You Were Spiraling	You Were Spiraling	CD	EP	October	
Mono Puff	The Hal Cragin Years	CD	EP	November	
Mono Puff	The Steve Calhoon Years	CD	EP	December	Final release

== See also ==
- List of record labels
