= They Might Be Giants =

American alternative rock duo

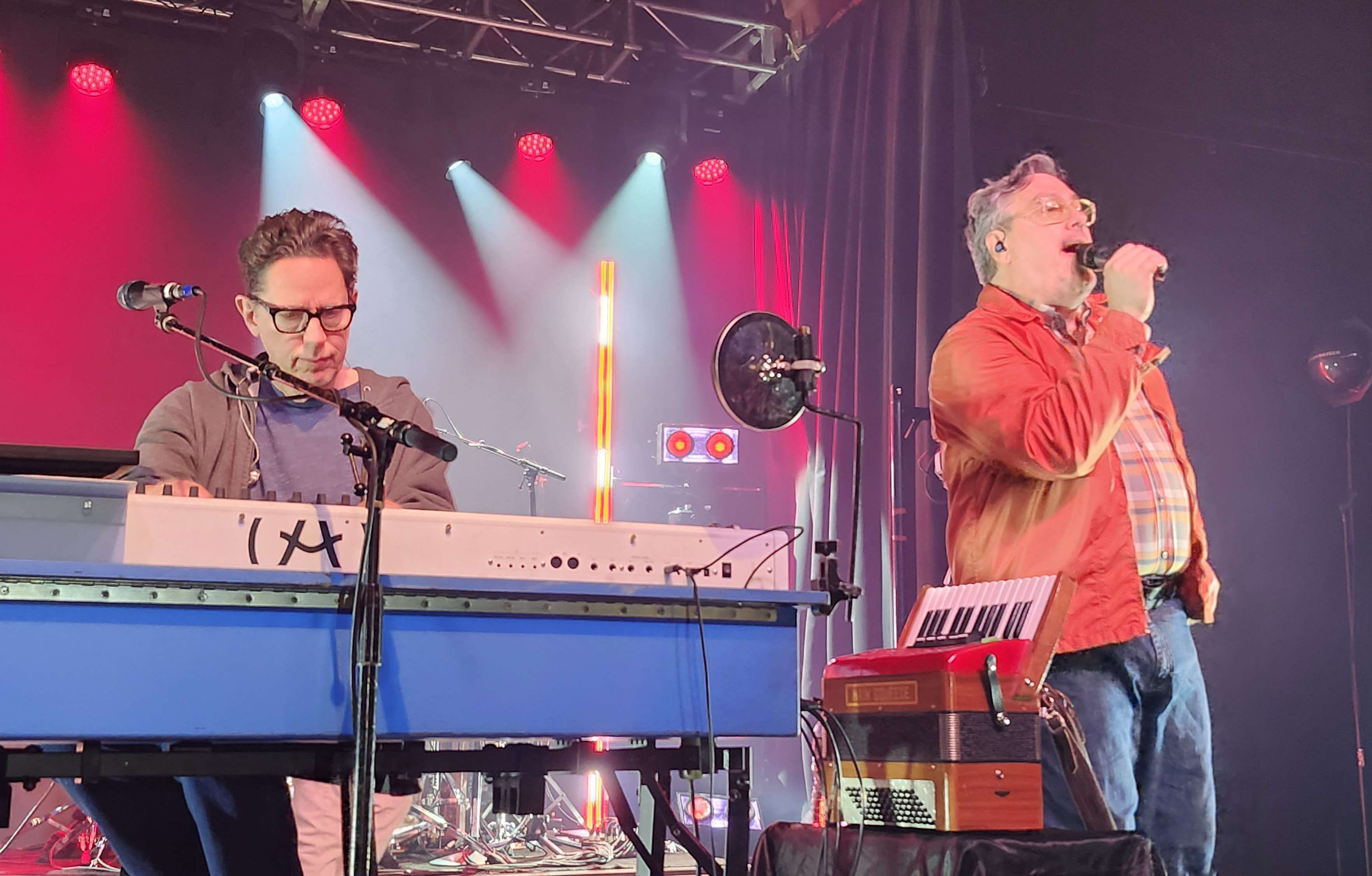
- John Linnell (left) and John Flansburgh (right) in 2025

Background information
- Also known as: TMBG; The Johns
- Origin: Brooklyn, New York, U.S.
- Genres: Alternative rock; art rock; power pop; children's music; geek rock; indie pop
- Works: Discography
- Years active: 1982–present
- Labels: Bar/None; Barsuk; Restless; Elektra; Zoë; Disney Sound; Rough Trade; Rounder; Lojinx; Megaforce; Idlewild
- Members: John Flansburgh; John Linnell; Danny Weinkauf; Dan Miller; Marty Beller; Dan Levine; Stan Harrison; Mark Pender
- Past members: Hal Cragin; Brian Doherty; Jonathan Feinberg; Dan Hickey; Kurt Hoffman; Graham Maby; Tony Maimone; Curt Ramm; Eric Schermerhorn
- Website: theymightbegiants.com

They Might Be Giants, often abbreviated as TMBG, is an American alternative rock band formed in Brooklyn in 1982 by vocalist and guitarist John Flansburgh and vocalist and multi-instrumentalist John Linnell. During the band's early years, Flansburgh and Linnell frequently performed as a musical duo, often accompanied by a tape machine or a drum machine. In 1992, They Might Be Giants expanded to include a backing band. The group's current backing band consists of Danny Weinkauf, Dan Miller, and Marty Beller, and their horn section consists of Dan Levine, Stan Harrison, and Mark Pender.

Over their career, they have found success on the modern rock and college radio charts. The band is known for its satirical outlook in many of their songs’ lyrics. They have also found success in children's music with several educational albums and in theme music for television programs and films.

They Might Be Giants has released 24 studio albums, starting with their self-titled debut album, They Might Be Giants, which was released in 1986. Their latest album is The World Is to Dig, which was released in 2026. The band's third album Flood is certified platinum, while their children's music albums Here Come the ABCs, Here Come the 123s, and Here Comes Science have all been certified gold. The band has been nominated for four Grammy Awards, winning two. They Might Be Giants won Best Film or Television Theme for the song "Boss of Me", the theme to Malcolm in the Middle. They Might Be Giants won Best Children's Album for Here Come the 123s. Flansburgh and Linnell were also nominated for a Tony Award for Best Original Score for SpongeBob SquarePants: The Broadway Musical, alongside several other musicians, for their contribution of the song "I'm Not a Loser".

== History ==
=== Formation (1981–1985) ===
John Flansburgh and John Linnell first met as teenagers growing up in Lincoln, Massachusetts. They began writing songs together while attending Lincoln-Sudbury Regional High School but did not form a band at that time. The two attended separate colleges after high school and Linnell joined The Mundanes, a new wave group from Rhode Island. The two reunited in 1981 after moving to Brooklyn to the same apartment building on the same day to continue their career.

At their first concert, They Might Be Giants were introduced as and performed under the name El Grupo De Rock and Roll (Spanish for "the Rock and Roll Band") because the show was a Sandinista rally in Central Park and a majority of the audience members spoke Spanish. They had previously chosen a name that, according to John Flansburgh, was "so bad that John [Linnell] and I have made a vow that we will never tell anyone, even our children." Soon discarding this name, the band assumed the name of the 1971 film They Might Be Giants (starring George C. Scott and Joanne Woodward), which is in turn taken from a Don Quixote passage about how Quixote mistook windmills for evil giants. According to Dave Wilson, in his book Rock Formations, the name They Might Be Giants had been used and subsequently discarded by a friend of the band who had a ventriloquism act. The name was then adopted by the band, who had been searching for a more suitable name.

A common misconception is that the name of the band is a reference to themselves and an allusion to future success. In an interview, John Flansburgh said that the words "they might be giants" are just a very outward-looking forward thing which they liked. He explained that the name refers to the outside world of possibilities that they saw as a fledgling band. In a radio interview, John Linnell described the phrase as "something very paranoid sounding".

The duo began performing their own music in and around New York City at the East Village Pyramid Club with Flansburgh on guitar, Linnell on accordion and saxophone, and accompanied by a drum machine or prerecorded backing track on audio cassette. Their atypical instrumentation, along with their songs which featured unusual subject matter and clever wordplay, soon attracted a strong local following.

From 1984 to 1987, They Might Be Giants were the house band at the Pyramid Club and Darinka, a Lower East Side performance art club. They played on the stage there one weekend a month and by the end of their three-year stint, their performances were selling out. In 1985, TMBG released their 7" flexi-disc, dubbed "Wiggle Diskette" at Darinka. The disc included two demos of songs.

In 1983, Linnell broke his wrist in a biking accident and Flansburgh's apartment was burgled, stopping them from performing for a time. During this hiatus, they began recording their songs onto an answering machine and then advertising the phone number in local newspapers such as The Village Voice, using the moniker "Dial-A-Song".

They Might Be Giants released a demo cassette in 1985, which earned them a review in People magazine. Authored by Michael Small, the review caught the attention of Bar/None Records, who signed them to a recording deal.

From the 1980s until 1998, Dial-A-Song consisted of an answering machine with a tape of the band playing various songs. The machine played one track at a time, ranging from demos and uncompleted work to mock advertisements the band had created. It was often difficult to access due to the popularity of the service and the dubious quality of the machines used. About this, one of Dial-A-Song's many slogans over the years was the tongue-in-cheek "Always Busy, Often Broken". The number was a local Brooklyn number and was charged accordingly. The band advertised it with the line: "Free when you call from work".

=== Earlier years (1986–1989) ===
Following the deal with Bar/None Records, the duo released their self-titled debut album in 1986, which became a college radio hit. The album sold 10,000 copies in its first year. The music video for "Don't Let's Start", filmed in Flushing Meadows–Corona Park and directed by Adam Bernstein, became a MTV hit in 1987.

In 1988, they released their second album, Lincoln. It featured the song "Ana Ng" which reached No. 11 on the U.S. Modern Rock chart. In 1990, Throttle magazine interviewed They Might Be Giants and clarified the meaning of the song "Ana Ng": John Flansburgh said, "Ng is a Vietnamese name. The song is about someone who's thinking about a person on the exact opposite side of the world. John looked at a globe and figured out that if Ana Ng is in Vietnam and the person is on the other side of the world, then it must be written by someone in Peru".

=== Move to Elektra (1990–1992) ===
"Birdhouse In Your Soul"
Chorus of the charting single "Birdhouse In Your Soul"

In 1990, They Might Be Giants released their third album Flood, through Elektra Records. Flood earned them a platinum album, largely from the success of "Birdhouse in Your Soul" which reached number three on the U.S. Modern Rock chart, as well as the cover of "Istanbul (Not Constantinople)" song originally recorded by the Four Lads.

Further interest in the band was generated when cartoon music videos for "Istanbul (Not Constantinople)" and "Particle Man" were created by Warner Bros. Animation for Tiny Toon Adventures.

In 1991, Bar/None Records released the B-sides compilation Miscellaneous T. In early 1992, They Might Be Giants released their fourth album Apollo 18. The heavy space theme coincided with TMBG being named Musical Ambassadors for International Space Year. Singles from the album included "The Statue Got Me High", "I Palindrome I", and "The Guitar (The Lion Sleeps Tonight)". Apollo 18 was one of the first albums to take advantage of the CD player's shuffle feature. The song "Fingertips" comprised 21 separate tracks that add up to 4:35 with the longest one being 61 seconds.

=== Recruiting a band (1993–1998) ===
Following Apollo 18, for live shows, Flansburgh and Linnell decided to move away from recorded backing tracks and recruited a supporting band: Kurt Hoffman of The Ordinaires on reeds and keyboards, longtime Pere Ubu bassist Tony Maimone, and drummer Jonathan Feinberg.

In 1993, Brian Doherty joined the band on drums. The band's fifth album, John Henry, was released in 1994. Influenced by their more conventional lineup, this album marked a departure from their previous releases with more of a guitar-heavy sound not dissimilar to the grunge music of the time. It was released to mixed reviews amongst fans and critics alike. Dan Levine (trumpet) also joined the band and in 1995, bassist Graham Maby joined the band.

Following John Henry, TMBG's sixth album, Factory Showroom, was released in 1996. It also is the last album they released through Elektra and their first album produced by Pat Dillett who has co-produced every album with them since then. In 1995, 1996, and 1997, Maimone, Doherty, and Maby left the band respectively. In that year, Eric Schermerhorn (guitar) joined and left the band and Dan Hickey (drums) and Hal Cragin (bass) joined TMBG.

In 1998, they released a mostly live album Severe Tire Damage from which came the single "Doctor Worm", a studio recording.

In 1998, Danny Weinkauf (bass) and Dan Miller (guitar) were recruited for their recording and touring band. Both had been members of the bands Lincoln and Candy Butchers which were previous opening acts for TMBG. Weinkauf and Miller continue to work with the band to the present day.

=== Beyond Elektra and move to Restless Records (1999–2003) ===
In 1999, they released their seventh album Long Tall Weekend, their first studio album since their departure from the major label Elektra. It made They Might Be Giants the first major-label recording artist to release an entire album exclusively in MP3 format.

Also in 1999, the band contributed the song "Dr. Evil" to the motion picture Austin Powers: The Spy Who Shagged Me. Over their career, the band has performed on numerous movie and television soundtracks, including The Oblongs, the ABC News miniseries Brave New World and Ed and His Dead Mother. They also performed the theme music "Dog on Fire", composed by Bob Mould, for The Daily Show with Jon Stewart.

"Boss of Me"
Sample of the band's Grammy Award–winning theme song to Malcolm in the Middle

Contributing the single "Boss of Me" as the theme song to the hit television series Malcolm in the Middle, as well as to the show's compilation CD, brought a new audience to the band. Not only did the band contribute the theme, but songs from all of the band's previous albums were used on the show. "Boss of Me" became TMBG's second top-40 hit in the UK which they performed on long-running UK television program Top of the Pops and, in 2002, won TMBG a Grammy Award.

In 2001, the band also worked on a project for McSweeney's, a publishing company and literary journal, an album titled They Might Be Giants vs. McSweeney's. The disk appears in issue No. 6 of Timothy McSweeney's Quarterly Concern.

On September 11, 2001, they released their eighth album Mink Car on Restless Records. It was their first full album release of new studio material since 1996 and their first since parting ways with Elektra.

In 2002, they released No!, their first album "for the entire family". They followed it up in 2003 with their first book, an illustrated children's book with an included EP, Bed, Bed, Bed. In 2003, Mark Pender (trumpet) joined the band.

They Might Be Giants got a documentary film directed by A. J. Schnack titled Gigantic (A Tale of Two Johns) that was released on DVD in 2003.

=== Podcasting, independent releases, and children's music (2004–2006) ===
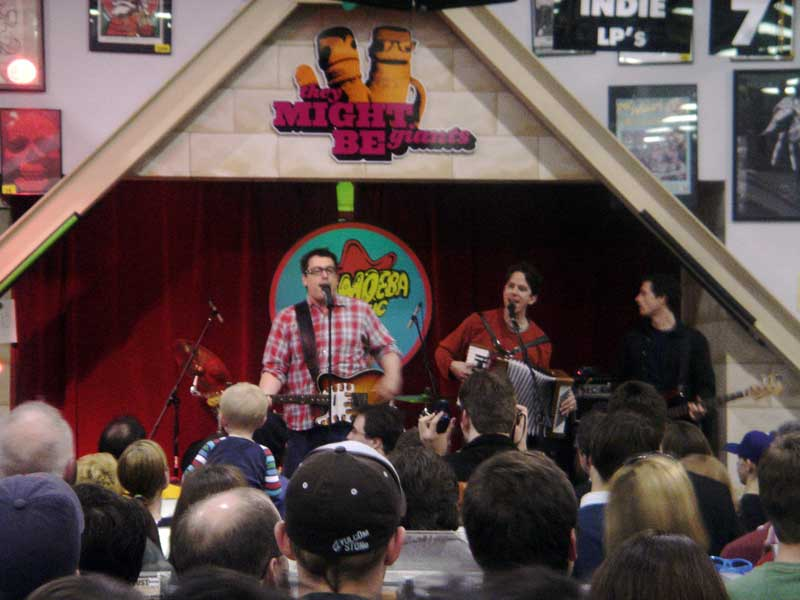
They Might Be Giants performing a free show at Amoeba Music in Hollywood, CA on March 25, 2005

In 2004, the band released its first new "adult" rock work since the release of No!, the EP Indestructible Object. This was followed by They Might Be Giants' ninth album, The Spine, and an associated EP, The Spine Surfs Alone. It was at this time that Dan Hickey was replaced by Marty Beller, who had previously collaborated with They Might Be Giants. For the album's first single, "Experimental Film", the band teamed up with Homestar Runner creators Matt and Mike Chapman to create an animated music video. The band's collaboration with the Brothers Chaps also included several Puppet Jam segments with puppet Homestar and the music for a Strong Bad email titled "Different Town". In 2008, they recorded a track for the 200th Strong Bad e-mail, where Linnell provided the voice of The Poopsmith.

Following the Spine on the Hiway Tour of 2004, the band announced that they would take an extended hiatus from touring to focus on other projects, such as a musical produced by Flansburgh and written by his wife, Robin Goldwasser, titled People Are Wrong!.

In 2005, They Might Be Giants released the children's album Here Come the ABCs, the band's follow-up to the successful children's album No!. The Disney Sound label released the CD and DVD separately in February 2005 later in October 2005 the two-disc CD/DVD set. In November 2005, Venue Songs was released as a two-disc CD/DVD set narrated by John Hodgman. It is a concept album based on all of the "venue songs" from their 2004 tour.

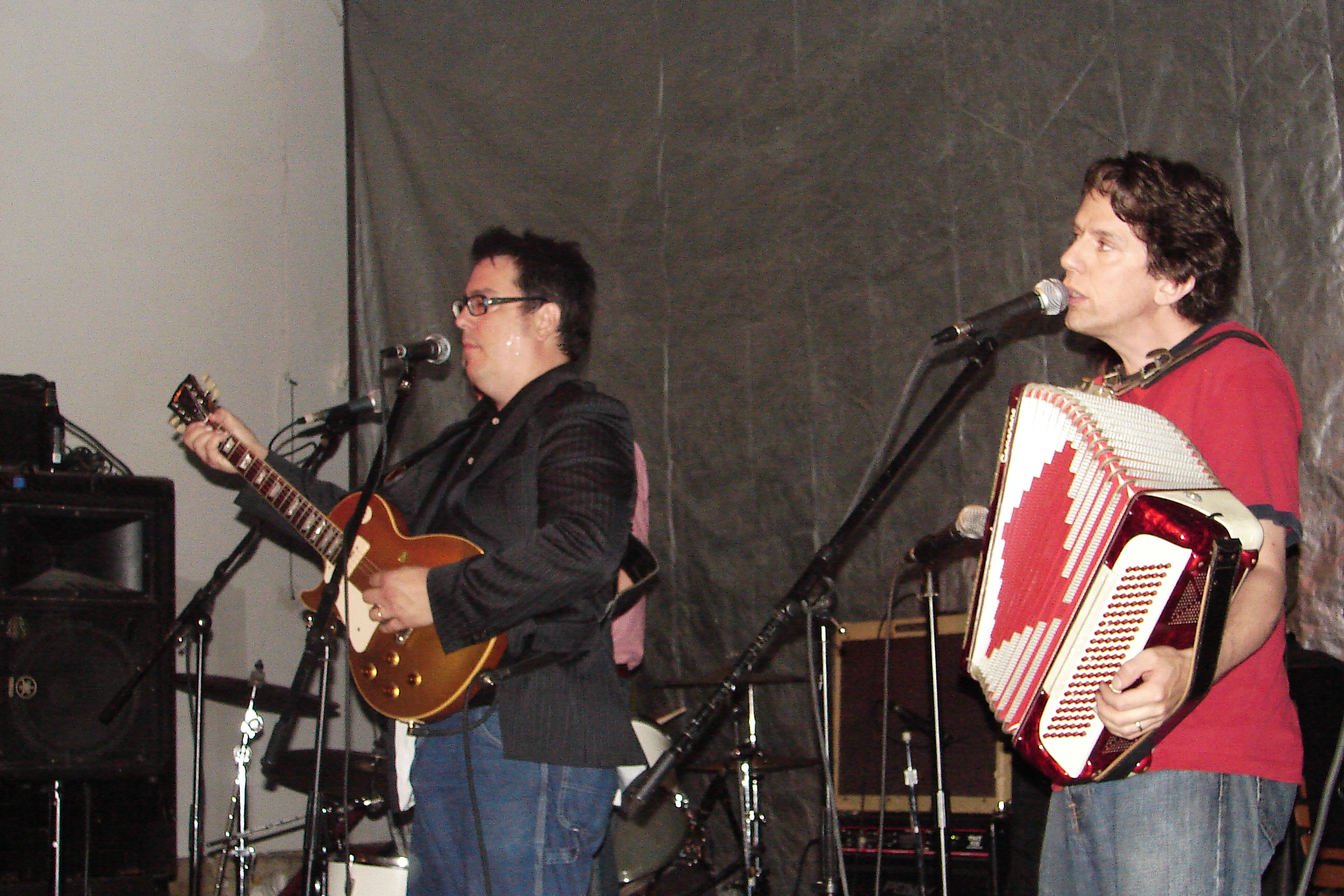
They Might Be Giants performing at Bar None, in Brooklyn, NY, 2006

The band contributed 14 original songs for the 2006 Dunkin' Donuts ad campaign, "America Runs on Dunkin'". Also in 2006, Stan Harrison (saxophone) joined They Might Be Giants' horn section.

=== Children's and independent releases (2007–2011) ===
They Might Be Giants composed and performed the theme song for the Disney Channel programs Mickey Mouse Clubhouse and Higglytown Heroes. They also composed the ending theme of Mickey Mouse Clubhouse titled "Hot Dog!".

In 2007, Curt Ramm (trumpet) joined the band. That year, the band recorded a cover of the Disney song "There's a Great Big Beautiful Tomorrow" for the film Meet the Robinsons and wrote and performed the theme song for The Drinky Crow Show.

Their 12th album, The Else, was released in July 2007, on Idlewild Recordings (and distributed by Zoë Records for the CD version), with an earlier digital release on May 15 at the iTunes Store. Advance copies were made available to stations by mid-June 2007.

In 2008, they rerecorded the song "Take Out The Trash" from The Else in Simlish for inclusion in The Sims 2: Freetime.

The band was recruited to provide original songs for the Henry Selick-directed film adaptation of Neil Gaiman's children's book Coraline but most were dropped during the creation process. Only one song, titled "Other Father Song", was kept for the film with Linnell singing as the titular "Other Father".

A They Might Be Giants logo

The band's 13th album, Here Come the 123s, a DVD/CD follow-up to 2005's critically acclaimed Here Come the ABCs children's project, was released in 2008. In 2009, the album won the Grammy Award for "Best Musical Album For Children" during the 51st Annual Grammy Awards.

The band's 14th album, Here Comes Science, was a science-themed children's album released in September 2009. The album was nominated for a Grammy Award on December 1, 2010. This album introduced listeners to natural, formal, social, and applied sciences.

In November 2009, They Might Be Giants stated that "The Avatars of They", a set of sock puppets the Johns manipulated for shows, would have an album in 2012, suggesting another children's album. However, their 15th album titled Join Us was released in 2011.

In October 2011, Artix Entertainment announced that the band would be performing in-game for a special musical event to commemorate the 3rd birthday of their popular MMORPG AdventureQuest Worlds. They were featured in AdventureQuest World's special third birthday event as John and John.

=== Continuing independent releases (2012–2019) ===
In March 2013, the band released their sixteenth adult studio album, Nanobots, on their Idlewild Recordings label in the US and on British indie label Lojinx in Europe. After Nanobots they released a studio album Glean in April 2015.

Dial-A-Song was revived in 2015, with a new phone number, website, and a radio network.

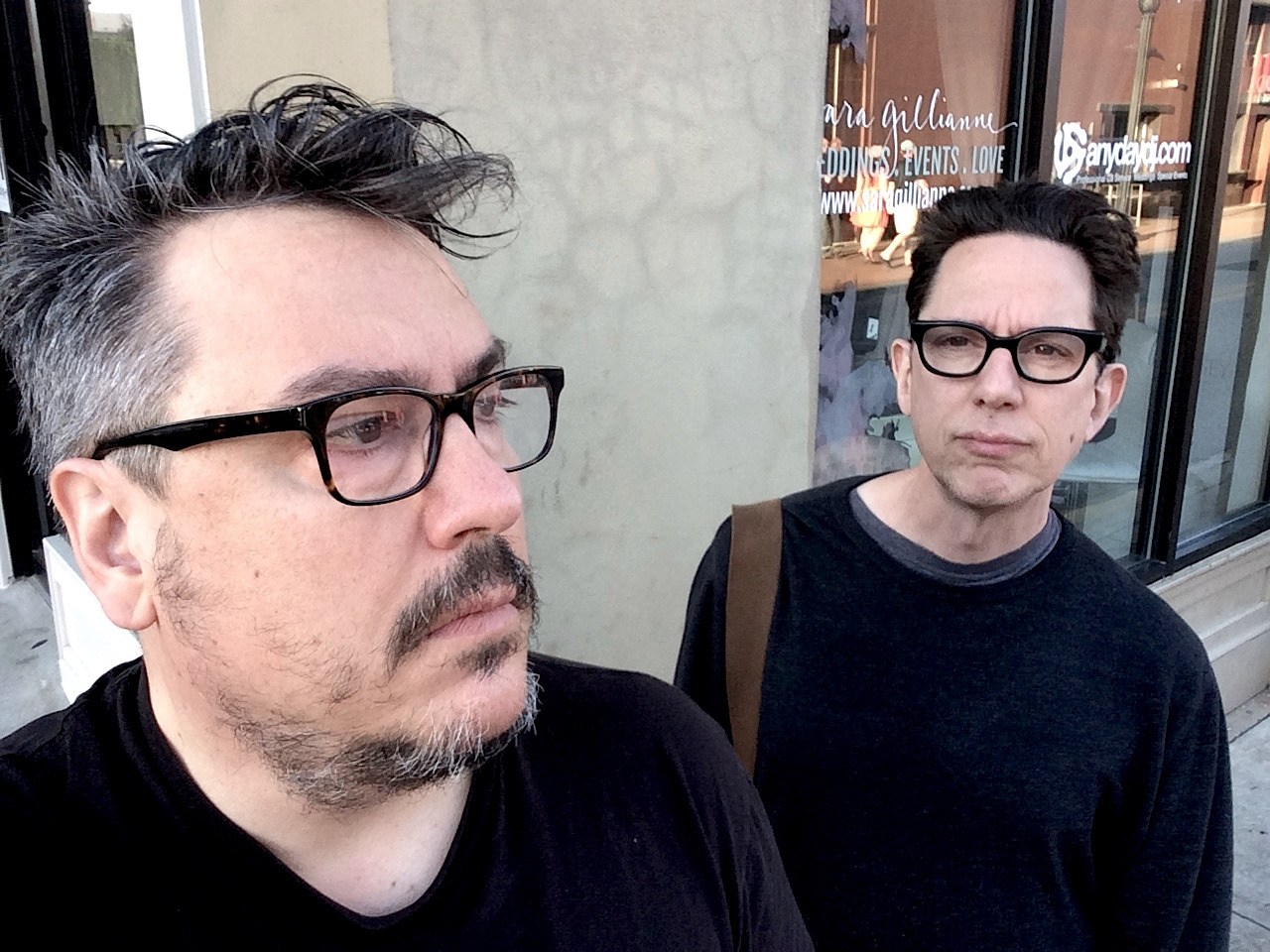
Flansburgh and Linnell in 2016

The band released their newest children's album, Why?, in November 2015. It released as their fifth children's album and the first children's album to be released under their own label, Idlewild Recordings.

In March 2016, the band released Phone Power, their nineteenth studio album and the third containing songs from the 2015 revival of their Dial-A-Song service. This was the first TMBG album to be sold as a "pay what you want" download, available ahead of the physical release on June 10. In 2016, They Might Be Giants were involved in the SpongeBob SquarePants musical; they contributed the song "I'm Not a Loser".

The band's 20th album, I Like Fun was released in January 2018. Their 21st and 22nd studio albums, My Murdered Remains and The Escape Team, were both released on December 10, 2018. My Murdered Remains contains songs from Dial-A-Song.

In October 2019, the band recorded a new version of their song "Hot Dog" for the third season of the Disney Channel preschool series Mickey and the Roadster Racers, re-titled as Mickey Mouse Mixed-Up Adventures for that season that premiered on Disney Junior.

=== Independent releases and Grammy nomination (2020–present) ===
In August 2020, the band recorded a song for a CNN documentary about the electoral college called "Who Are the Electors?".

They Might Be Giants was touring for the 30th anniversary of Flood starting in 2020. While initially only including songs from Flood, it expanded to include tracks from other albums. The tour included the eight-piece band members and shows sold-out throughout the tour.

In November 2021, They Might Be Giants released an album titled Book. Some lyrical themes in the album seem to have been inspired by the COVID-19 pandemic. They Might Be Giants continued their Book tour called "The Big Tour" into late 2025, which included songs from much of their discography. These shows also sold-out internationally.

The band announced a 30th anniversary Flood tour for 2020; however, it was postponed, and dates were rescheduled several times due to the COVID-19 pandemic. Shortly after resuming live tours again in June 2022, John Flansburgh was involved in a car accident while on his way home from the June 8 concert. He suffered several broken ribs but had a positive prognosis from doctors. Several tour dates were again postponed while he recovered; the tour was later resumed after he healed.

In November 2022, Book was nominated for a 65th Annual Grammy Awards in the category of "Best Boxed or Special Limited-Edition Package". They Might Be Giants performed "Brontosaurus" on Jimmy Kimmel Live! in support of Book in April 2023.

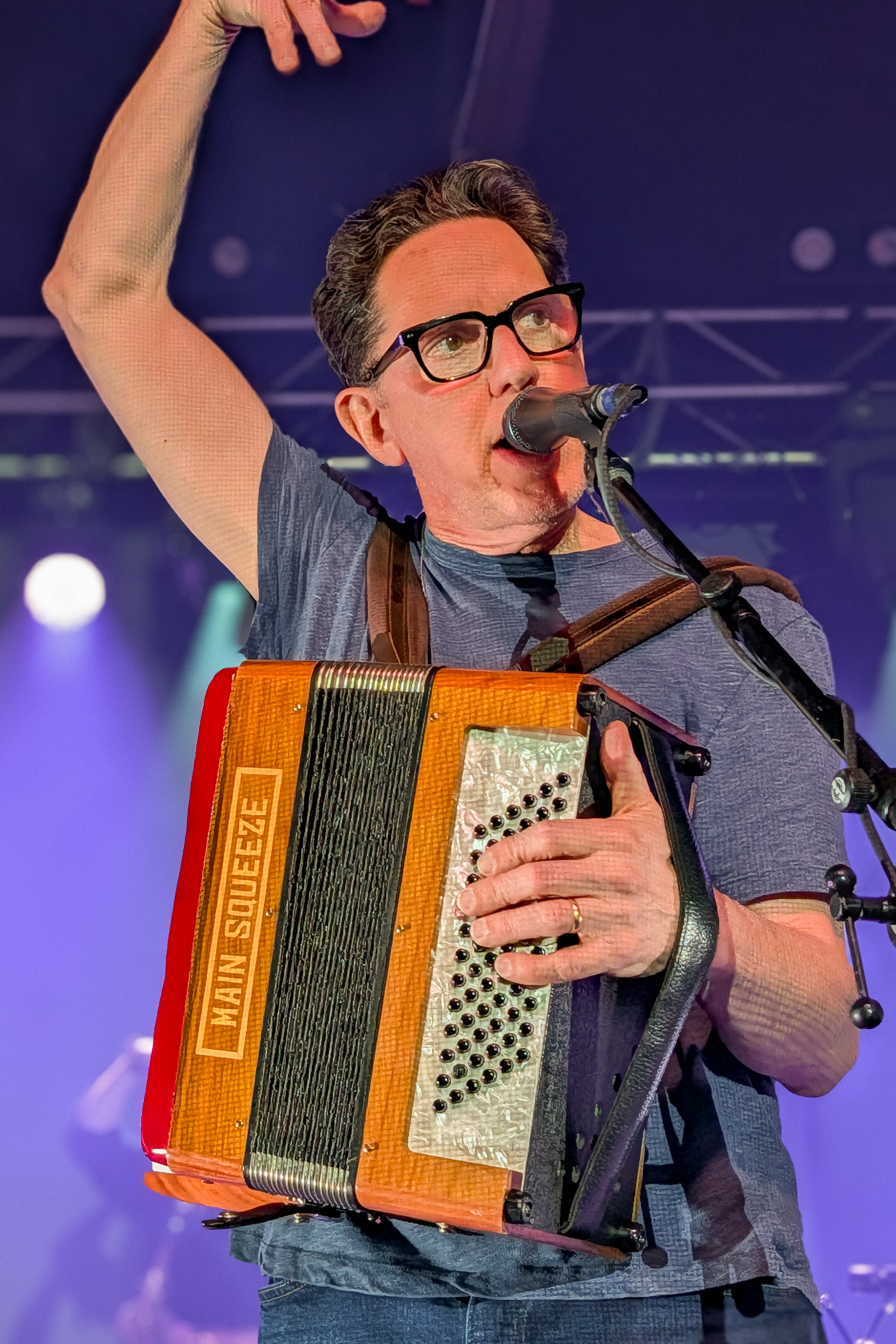
John Linnell in 2025

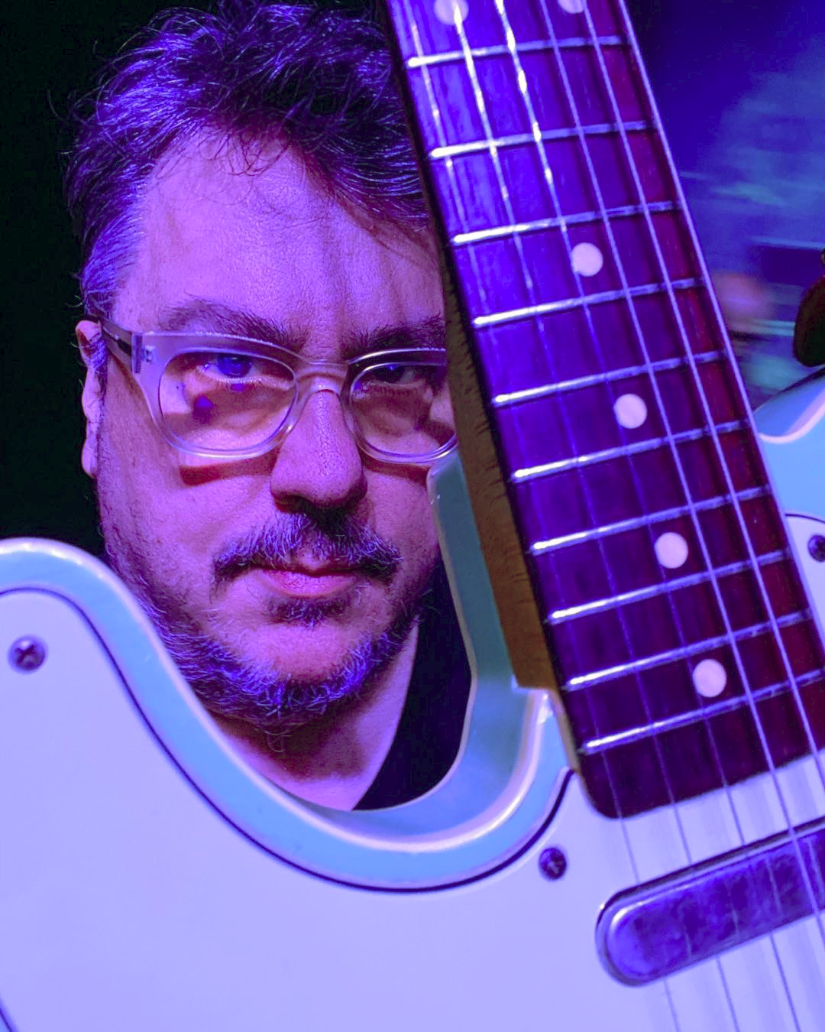
John Flansburgh in 2023

In mid-January 2026, They Might Be Giants released a four-song EP titled Eyeball. The EP includes a remix from Elegant Too of the title track. A few weeks later, on February 9, the band released the single "Wu-Tang". That day, they announced that their upcoming 24th album is called The World Is to Dig. On March 3, they released another single from the album "Sleep's Older Sister". They Might Be Giants released the single "Outside Brain" on March 16, 2026. On March 31, 2026, They Might Be Giants released a cover of "Overnight Sensation (Hit Record)" as a single. The World Is to Dig was released on April 14, 2026.

== Solo projects ==
In 1995, John Flansburgh formed a side project called Mono Puff; the band consisted of a core lineup of Flansburgh, bassist Hal Cragin, and drummer Steve Calhoon. Mono Puff released two albums, Unsupervised (1996) and It's Fun to Steal (1998) in addition to four EPs and one single. In 2023, Flansburgh released a solo EP under his name titled Forest/Trees.

John Linnell released a five-song solo EP in 1994. The EP was later expanded into the State Songs album solo project in 1999 which peaked number 18 on the CMJ 200 chart and was on the chart for four weeks. During the COVID-19 pandemic, in 2021, John Linnell also released another solo EP, Roman Songs, which has four songs that are entirely sung in Latin. Linnell stated that a Latinist and friend of his who he calls "Schoolmaster Smith" helped him translate English lyrics into Latin with him for the project.

In 1993, John Flansburgh started Hello CD of the Month Club, a subscription service for monthly issues of EPs on CD. Both Mono Puff and John Linnell released EPs on Hello CD of the Month Club. They Might Be Giants issued their 1985 demo tape and a 1994 live performance through the service. Hello CD of the Month Club went defunct at the end of 1996.

== Music style ==
The group has been noted for its unique style of alternative music, typically using surreal, humorous lyrics, experimental styles, and unconventional instruments. Their music is often described as "quirky" by listeners. Shervin Lainez in an IMDb news article about the band said, "... They Might Be Giants [...] have been releasing music that's both snarky and sweet, morbid and whimsical, a little pop and a little avant garde."

== Members ==
Principal members
- John Flansburgh – lead vocals, guitar (1982–present), bass guitar (1982–1992)
- John Linnell – lead vocals, accordion, keyboards, woodwinds (1982–present)

Current backing band members

- Dan Miller – guitar, keyboards, backing vocals (1998–present)
- Danny Weinkauf – bass guitar, keyboards (1998–present)
- Marty Beller – drums, percussion (2002–present; part time 2002–2003)
- Dan Levine – trombone, euphonium, tuba (1994–present)
- Stan Harrison – saxophone, clarinet, bass clarinet, flute (2006–present)
- Mark Pender – trumpet (2003–present)
Former backing band members
- Kurt Hoffman – keyboards, woodwinds (1992–1994)
- Tony Maimone – bass guitar (1992–1995)
- Brian Doherty – drums (1993–1996)
- Graham Maby – bass guitar (1995–1997)
- Eric Schermerhorn – guitar (1996)
- Dan Hickey – drums (1997–2003; part time 2002–2003)
- Curt Ramm – trumpet, valve trombone, euphonium (2007–2022)

Former touring band members

- Jonathan Feinberg – drums (1992)
- Hal Cragin – bass guitar (1997–1998)

== Discography ==
Throughout their career, They Might Be Giants have released 24 studio albums, 18 compilations, 20 live albums, 25 EPs, and 40 singles.

=== Main albums ===
- They Might Be Giants (1986)
- Lincoln (1988)
- Flood (1990)
- Apollo 18 (1992)
- John Henry (1994)
- Factory Showroom (1996)
- Long Tall Weekend (1999)
- Mink Car (2001)
- The Spine (2004)
- The Else (2007)
- Join Us (2011)
- Nanobots (2013)
- Glean (2015)
- Phone Power (2016)
- I Like Fun (2018)
- My Murdered Remains (2018)
- The Escape Team (2018)
- Book (2021)
- The World Is to Dig (2026)

=== Children's albums ===
- No! (2002)
- Here Come the ABCs (2005)
- Here Come the 123s (2008)
- Here Comes Science (2009)
- Why? (2015)

=== Charted singles ===
Title	Year	Peak chart positions				Certifications	Album
Title	Year	US Alt.	AUS	NLD	UK	Certifications	Album
"Don't Let's Start"	1987	—	94	—	—		They Might Be Giants
"Ana Ng"	1988	11	154	—	—		Lincoln
"Birdhouse in Your Soul"	1990	3	125	—	6	BPI: Silver	Flood
"Twisting"	1990	22	—	—	—		Flood
"Istanbul (Not Constantinople)"	1990	—	—	—	61		Flood
"The Statue Got Me High"	1992	24	155	—	92		Apollo 18
"Snail Shell"	1994	19	—	—	—		John Henry
"Boss of Me"	2001	—	29	89	21		Music from Malcolm in the Middle
"Man, It's So Loud in Here"	2001	—	86	—	—		Mink Car
"—" denotes a recording that did not chart or was not released in that territory.

== Awards and nominations ==
Year	Organization	Nominee / work	Award	Result	Ref.
2002	Grammy Awards	"Boss of Me"	Best Song Written for Visual Media	Won	
2006	Annie Awards	"Bastard Wants to Hit Me"	Best Animated Television Commercial	Nominated	
2009	Grammy Awards	Here Come the 123s	Best Musical Album for Children	Won	
2011	Grammy Awards	Here Comes Science	Best Musical Album for Children	Nominated	
2018	Outer Critics Circle Award	SpongeBob SquarePants	Outstanding New Score (Note: Shared with Yolanda Adams, Steven Tyler & Joe Perry, Sara Bareilles, Jonathan Coulton, Alex Ebert, The Flaming Lips, Lady Antebellum, Cyndi Lauper & Rob Hyman, John Legend, Brendon Urie, Plain White T's, T.I., Domani & Lil'C, David Bowie & Brian Eno, Andy Paley & Tom Kenny, Derek Drymon, Mark Harrison, Stephen Hillenburg & Blaise Smith, Tom Kitt.)	Won	
2018	Tony Awards	SpongeBob SquarePants	Best Original Score	Nominated	
2023	Grammy Awards	Book	Best Boxed or Special Limited Edition Package	Nominated	

== See also ==
- List of songwriter duos
