= Manhunters: Fugitive Task Force =

- Opening theme: Daniel Miller; Marty Beller
- Composer: Ramón Balcázar
- Country of origin: United States

Production
- Executive producers: Gary Tarpinian; Stuart Goodman; Vincent Scarza
- Running time: 23 minutes (per episode)

Original release
- Network: A&E
- Release: December 2008

Manhunters: Fugitive Task Force is a half-hour reality television show that premiered on A&E in December 2008. It chronicled US Marshals and local law enforcement as they hunted down some of America's worst fugitives. The show's 60 episodes' primary focus was on the New York/New Jersey Regional Fugitive Task Force based out of New York City. The show's first season averaged 1.6 million viewers.

== About the Fugitive Task Force ==
The New York/New Jersey Regional Fugitive Task Force (NY/NJ RFTF) became operational in May 2002. It has Memoranda of Understanding with over 80 federal, state, or local agencies and three offices in the New York/New Jersey area.

The force was mandated by Congress after the September 11 attacks, and the US Marshals allowed the show to be made because of its public relations value.

== Main cast ==
- Commander (Chief Inspector) Lenny DePaul - US Marshals Service
- Supervisor Thomas "Tommy" Kilbride - US Immigration and Customs Enforcement (ICE)
- Senior Inspector Greg Holmes - US Marshals Service
- Detective Roxanne "Roxy" Lopez - Spring Valley, NY, Police Department
- Detective Dave "Hummy" Humeston - Spring Valley, NY, Police Department
- Deputy Michelle "Michy" Mendez - US Marshals Service
- Detective Rasheen "Pep" Peppers - Newark, NJ, Police Department
- Senior Inspector Mike Romani - US Marshals Service
- Senior Parole Officer Vinny Senzamici - New York State Division of Parole
- Special Agent Hector Colon - US Immigration and Customs Enforcement (ICE)
- Deputy Michelle Rios-Marsala - US Marshals Service
- Deputy Nicholas "Nick" Ricigliano - US Marshals Service

== Participating agencies ==
Federal Agencies

- United States Marshals Service
- Bureau of Alcohol, Tobacco, Firearms, and Explosives
- Bureau of Immigration and Customs Enforcement
- Drug Enforcement Administration
- Department of Housing and Urban Development, OIG
- Federal Bureau of Investigation
- United States Probation Service
- United States Secret Service
- United States Department of Veterans Affairs Police

Regional agencies New York/New Jersey High Density Drug Trafficking Area

- Port Authority of New York and New Jersey Police Department

New Jersey

- Atlantic City Police Department
- Atlantic City Prosecutor's and Sheriff's Office
- Bergen County Prosecutor's and Sheriff's Office
- Burlington County Prosecutor's and Sheriff's Office
- Camden County Prosecutor's and Sheriff's Office
- Camden Police Department
- Cape May County Prosecutor's and Sheriff's Office
- Cumberland County Prosecutor's and Sheriff's Office
- Deptford Township Police Department
- Eatontown Police Department
- Essex County Prosecutor's and Sheriff's Office
- Gloucester County Prosecutor's and Sheriff's Office
- Hudson County Prosecutor's and Sheriff's Office
- Hamilton Police Department
- Hunterdon County Prosecutor's and Sheriff's Office
- Jersey City Police Department
- Mercer County Prosecutor's and Sheriff's Office
- Middlesex Prosecutor's and Sheriff's Office
- Monmouth Prosecutor's and Sheriff's Office
- Morris County Prosecutor's and Sheriff's Office
- Newark Police Department
- New Jersey Attorney General's Office
- New Jersey Department of Corrections
- New Jersey Department of Human Services Police
- New Jersey State Parole
- New Jersey State Police
- Ocean County Prosecutor's and Sheriff's Office
- Passaic County Prosecutor's and Sheriff's Office
- Paterson Police Department
- Pleasantville Police Department
- Salem County Prosecutor's and Sheriff's Office
- Somerset County Prosecutor's and Sheriff's Office
- Sussex County Prosecutor's and Sheriff's Office
- Trenton Police Department
- Union County Prosecutor's and Sheriff's Office
- Warren County Prosecutor's and Sheriff's Office

New York

- Dutchess County Sheriff's Office
- Glen Clove Police Department
- Mt. Vernon Police Department
- Nassau County District Attorney
- Nassau County Police Department
- Nassau County Probation Department
- Nassau County Sheriff's Office
- New York City Police Department
- New York National Guard
- New York State Corrections IG
- New York State Parole
- New York State Police
- Orange County Sheriff's Office
- Putnam County Sheriff's Department
- Riverhead Police Department
- Rockland County Sheriff's Department
- Spring Valley Police Department
- Suffolk County District Attorney
- Suffolk County Police Department
- Suffolk County Probation Department
- Suffolk County Sheriff's Department
