= Danny Weinkauf =

Musical artist (born 1963)

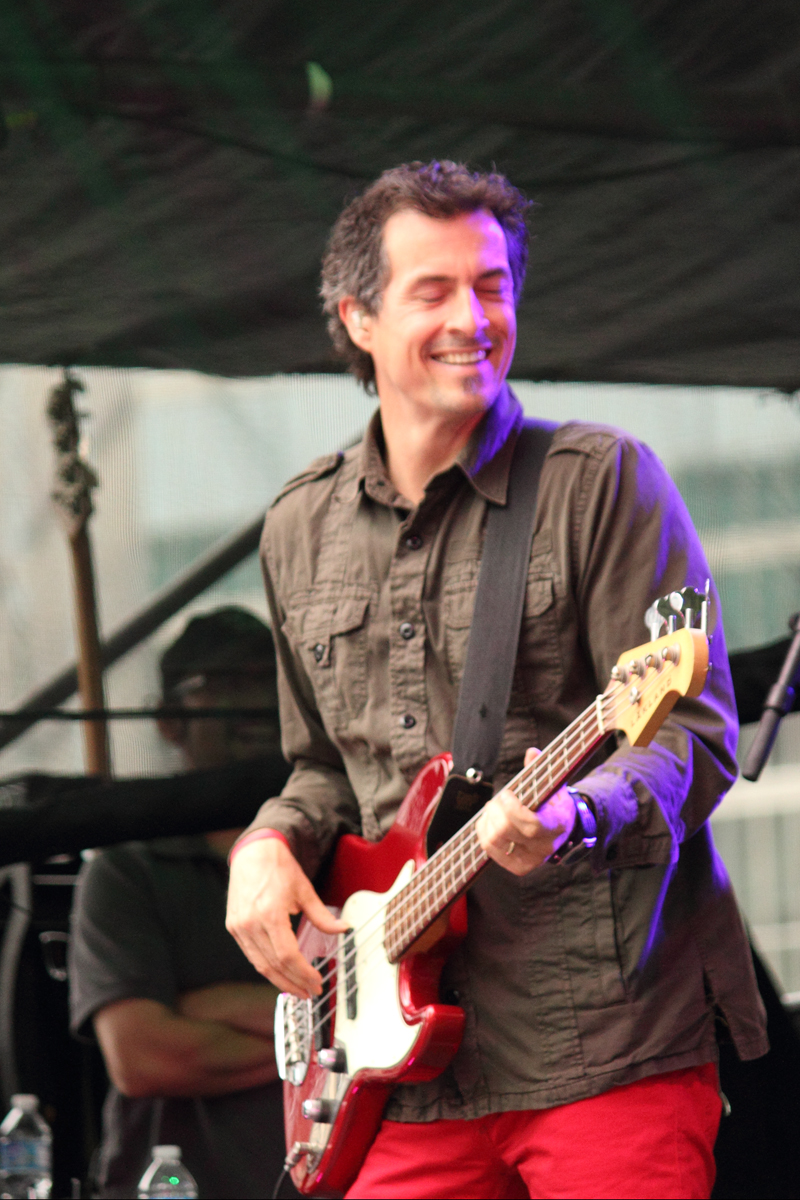
- Weinkauf performing in 2011

Background information
- Born: December 4, 1963 (age 62)
- Genre: Alternative rock
- Occupations: Musician, songwriter
- Instruments: Bass guitar, guitar, keyboards, vocals
- Years active: 1995–present
- Labels: Disney Sound, Idlewild Recordings, Red Pants Music
- Website: www.dannyweinkauf.com

Daniel Stephen Weinkauf (born December 4, 1963) is an American musician and composer. He has been the bassist for They Might Be Giants since 1998. He has recorded and toured with the band since the late 1990s.

Weinkauf had previously performed in a band called Lincoln along with TMBG's now lead guitarist Dan Miller and drummer Gonzalo Martinez De La Cotera. He has written four songs for They Might Be Giants, all for their children's albums.

== Musical career ==
=== Education and first band ===
Weinkauf attended Berklee College of Music for a year and got his start in music in the New York City-based band The Belltower. The band also featured Jody Porter (Fountains of Wayne), Britta Phillips (Luna - Dean and Britta), and Pete McNeal (Cake). In 1996, he played bass on Fountains of Wayne's debut album.

=== Early 2000s ===
Weinkauf has also played on albums by David Mead, Stephen Fretwell, CandyButchers, and The Davenports, among other musical acts. He and Brian Speiser produced Common Rotation's 2003 album The Big Fear and can be found in two videos of studio footage on their website.

=== Early 2010s ===
Weinkauf produced the album The Way We Found It for artist Syd. In 2011, Weinkauf started Red Pants Music which is a website representing his commercial, television, and film composition work. He has also written and produced hundreds of tracks of music for television, commercials, and movies.

Credits include:

- Sex and the City
- Malcolm in the Middle
- Queer Eye for the Straight Guy,
- Jon and Kate plus 8
- ABC Wide World of Sports
- HBO
- CBS Sports
- ESPN
- Resident Life
- History Channel
- MTV

- Food Network
- A&E
- Mercedes-Benz
- Saturn
- Burger King
- McDonald's
- Dunkin' Donuts
- Radio Shack
- Big Brother/Sisters
- Elmer's Glue
- Kohl's

=== Mid-2010s and solo albums ===
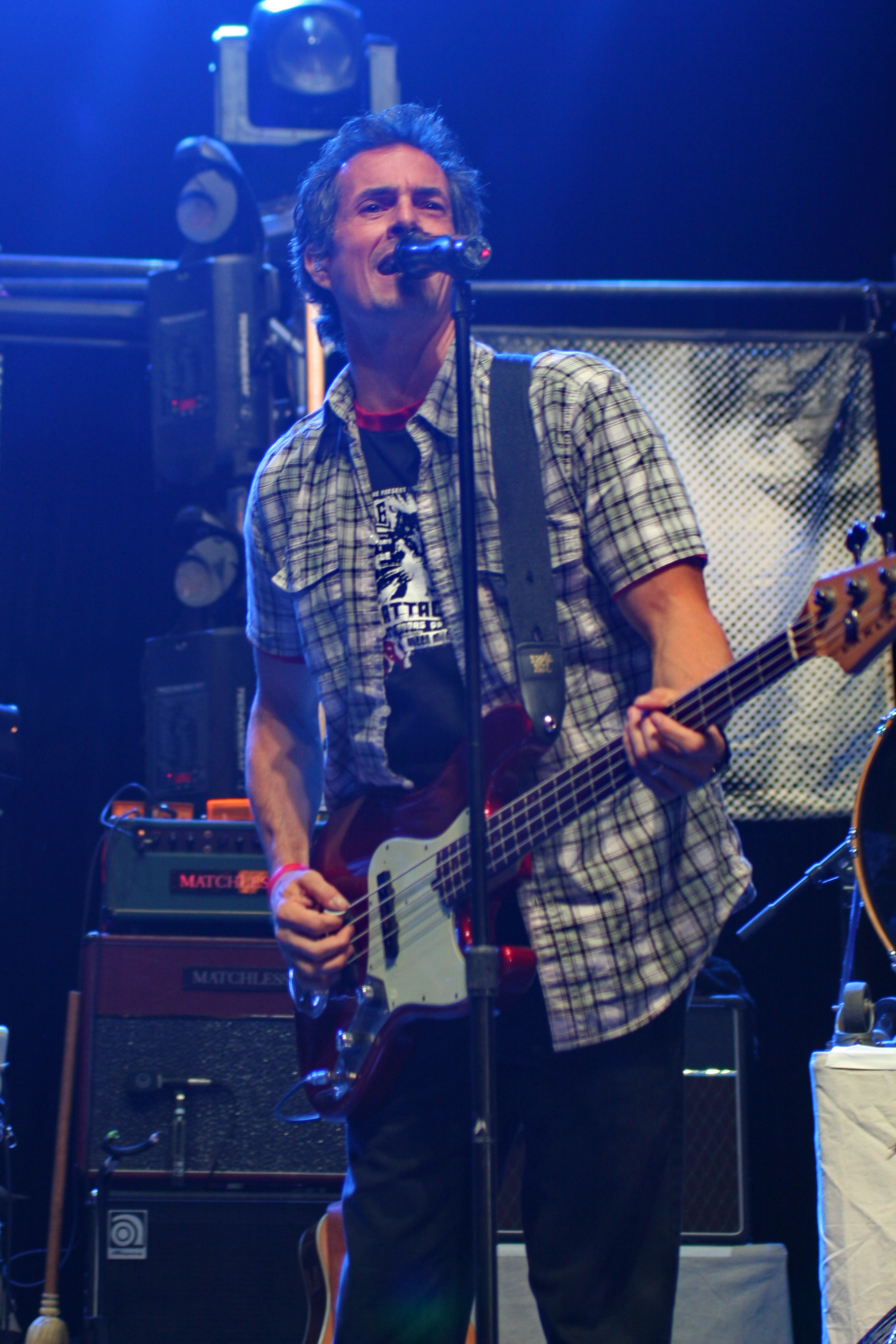
Weinkauf in 2010

In April 2014, Weinkauf signed with Idlewild Records as a solo children's music artist and released No School Today. No School Today featured 16 songs penned by Weinkauf with lyrics co-written by others on 3 songs. Weinkauf produced and played all the instruments on the album and featured his wife and two children. Children's musician Laurie Berkner appears as a guest vocalist on "Our Love Fits." Hank Green appears on "The Kidney That Lived in Four People" which he also co-wrote.

In 2014, Weinkauf began releasing albums for children and families including, "No School Today" (2014), "Red Pants Band" (2016), "Totally Osome!" (2017), "Inside I Shine" (2018), "Dinosaurs and Metaphors" (2020), "Words" (2021), "lullabies" (2022) and "Light Up Your Love" (2023). The later 7 albums were all released on his own label Red Pants Music except "Words" (8 Pound Gorilla Records).

Weinkauf released videos for several of the album's songs. The album's first single, "Champion of the Spelling Bee", went to #1 on Sirius XM Kids Place Live and featured Weinkauf's 12-year-old son Kai on lead vocals.

In October 2014, Weinkauf released his first holiday single called "Wonderful Christmas Day" as a digital release on Idlewild records. In 2015, Weinkauf released 4 singles including "It's your Birthday", "My Mom", "Only One You", and "Super Powered Mindy" which have all been featured on Kids Place Live. In 2015, Weinkauf also wrote and produced the song and video "B is for Build" for Sesame Street as part of their 47th season.

=== Since 1998: They Might Be Giants ===
Weinkauf wrote and sang "Where Do They Make Balloons?" on the They Might Be Giants children's album No!, "Number Two" from Here Come The 123s, "I Am a Paleontologist" from Here Comes Science, and "Elephants" from Why?. He joined the band in 1998 and has been playing bass for the band since 1999.

== Personal life ==
Weinkauf is married to Michelle Weinkauf (née Gotthardt). He has two children, Lena and Kai Weinkauf, who perform spoken word parts on the song "I Am a Paleontologist". Kai sings lead vocals for "Champion of the Spelling Bee", "Together we can Fly", "Ambivalent", "Picky Eaters", "Antithesis", and "A song about Anything". Weinkauf's wife and two children perform several vocal and spoken parts on his solo albums. Weinkauf's son Kai has launched his own career as an indie recording artist and releases music under his own name.

== Awards ==
In 2002, They Might Be Giants song "Boss of Me" won the Grammy for Best Song Written for Visual Media; Weinkauf played both bass and guitar. In 2009, TMBG was awarded a Grammy for Best Children's Album for Here Come the 123s, featuring one song written by Weinkauf. In 2011, TMBG was nominated a third time with Here Comes Science, which features Weinkauf's song "I Am a Paleontologist". In 2014, "No School Today" was declared a Parents' Choice Award winner and a NAPPA award winner. Weinkauf's song "Elephants" was an International Songwriting Competition winner in 2015.
