= Robin Goldwasser =

American singer and playwright (born 1966)

- Also known as: Goldie
- Born: August 14, 1966 (age 60)
- Genres: Alternative rock
- Occupations: Singer, playwright
- Instrument: Vocals
- Years active: 1990s–present
- Spouse: John Flansburgh (m. 1996)

Robin Goldwasser (born August 14, 1966) is an American singer and playwright. She is the co-writer of the musical People Are Wrong! with Julia Greenberg. Goldwasser has a character in the play, as does the producer, her husband, John Flansburgh of They Might Be Giants.

== Works ==
Robin has sung on They Might Be Giants and Mono Puff tracks, including the Austin Powers: The Spy Who Shagged Me song "Doctor Evil", "The Poisonousness" and "Electric Car", and has toured with both bands. She also sings on the People Are Wrong! CD.
