= AJ Schnack =

Film director

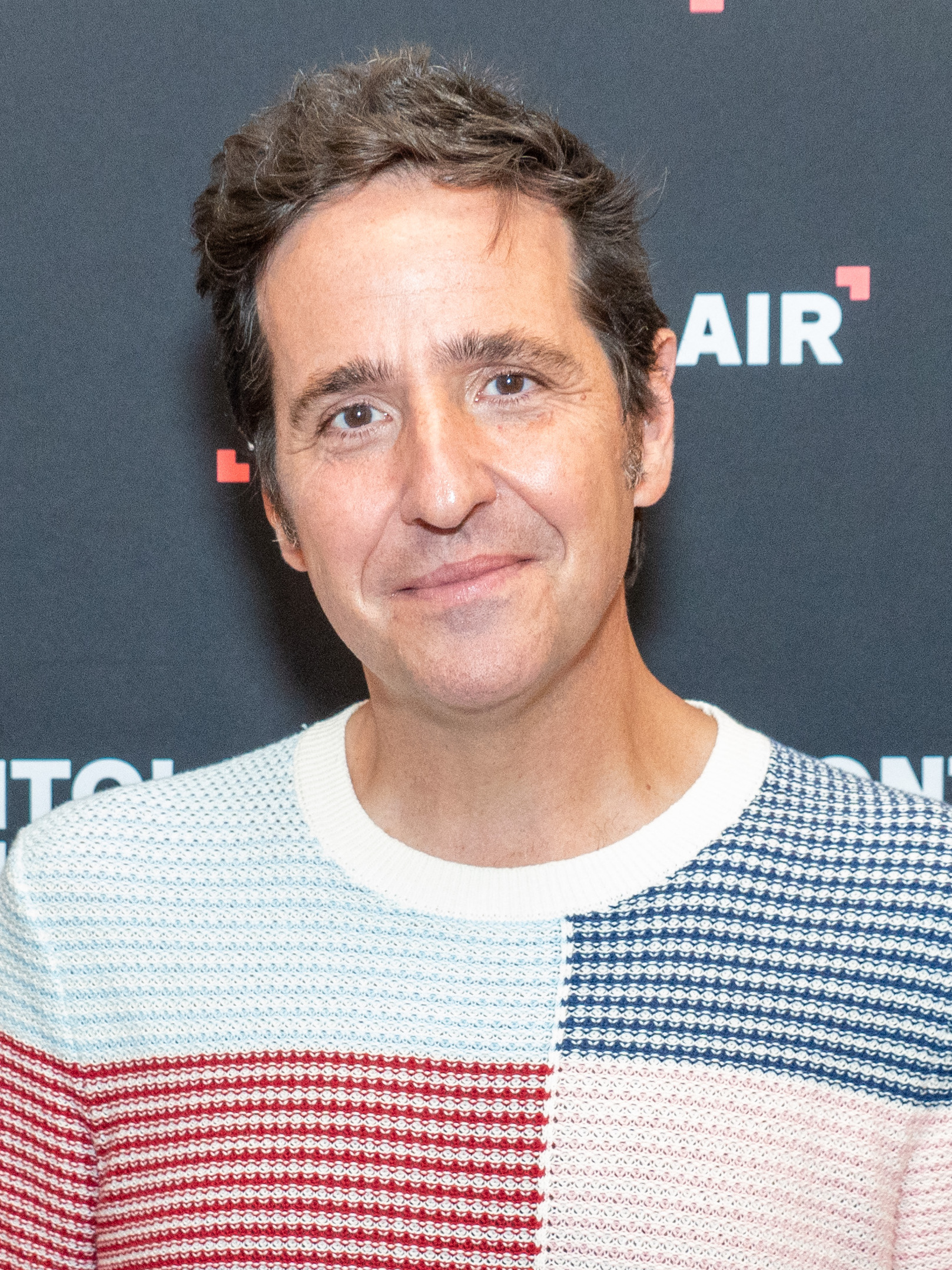
- Schnack in 2024
- Born: 1968 (age 57–58)
- Occupation: Filmmaker

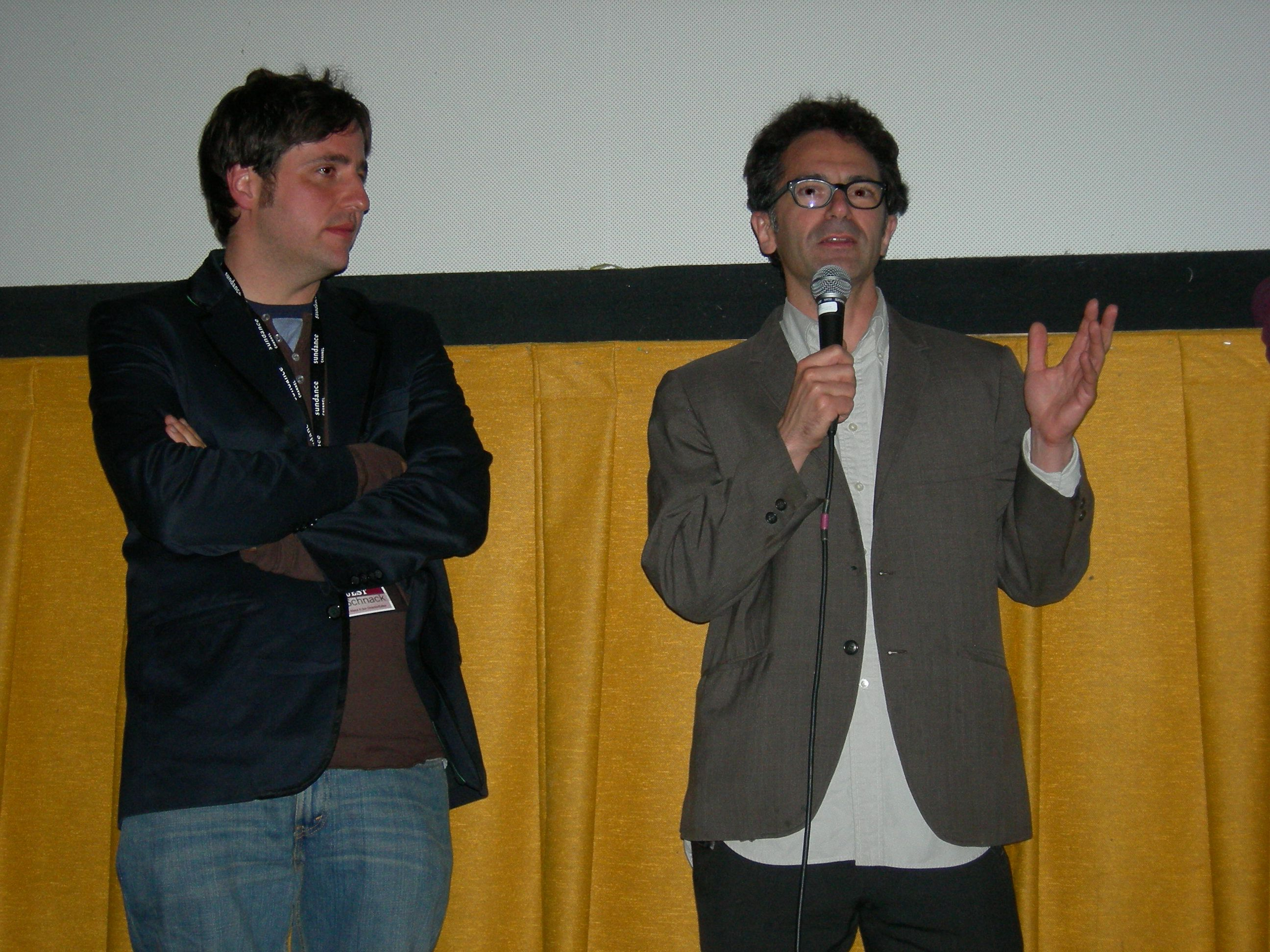
AJ Schnack (left) and Michael Azerrad at the 2007 Seattle International Film Festival

AJ Schnack is an independent filmmaker. He directed Kurt Cobain: About a Son, which premiered at the 2006 Toronto International Film Festival. His first feature film was a documentary about American alternative rock band They Might Be Giants titled Gigantic (A Tale of Two Johns).

In late 2007, he founded the Cinema Eye Honors, an award for nonfiction filmmaking that was first presented at the IFC Center in New York City on March 18, 2008.

In 2020, Schnack directed Long Gone Summer, an ESPN 30 For 30 documentary about the 1998 Major League Baseball home run record chase.

Schnack writes the film blog All These Wonderful Things, which focuses on news related to nonfiction or documentary filmmaking.

AJ Schnack directed the 2024 documentary Majority Rules.
