= John Linnell =

American musician and songwriter (born 1959)

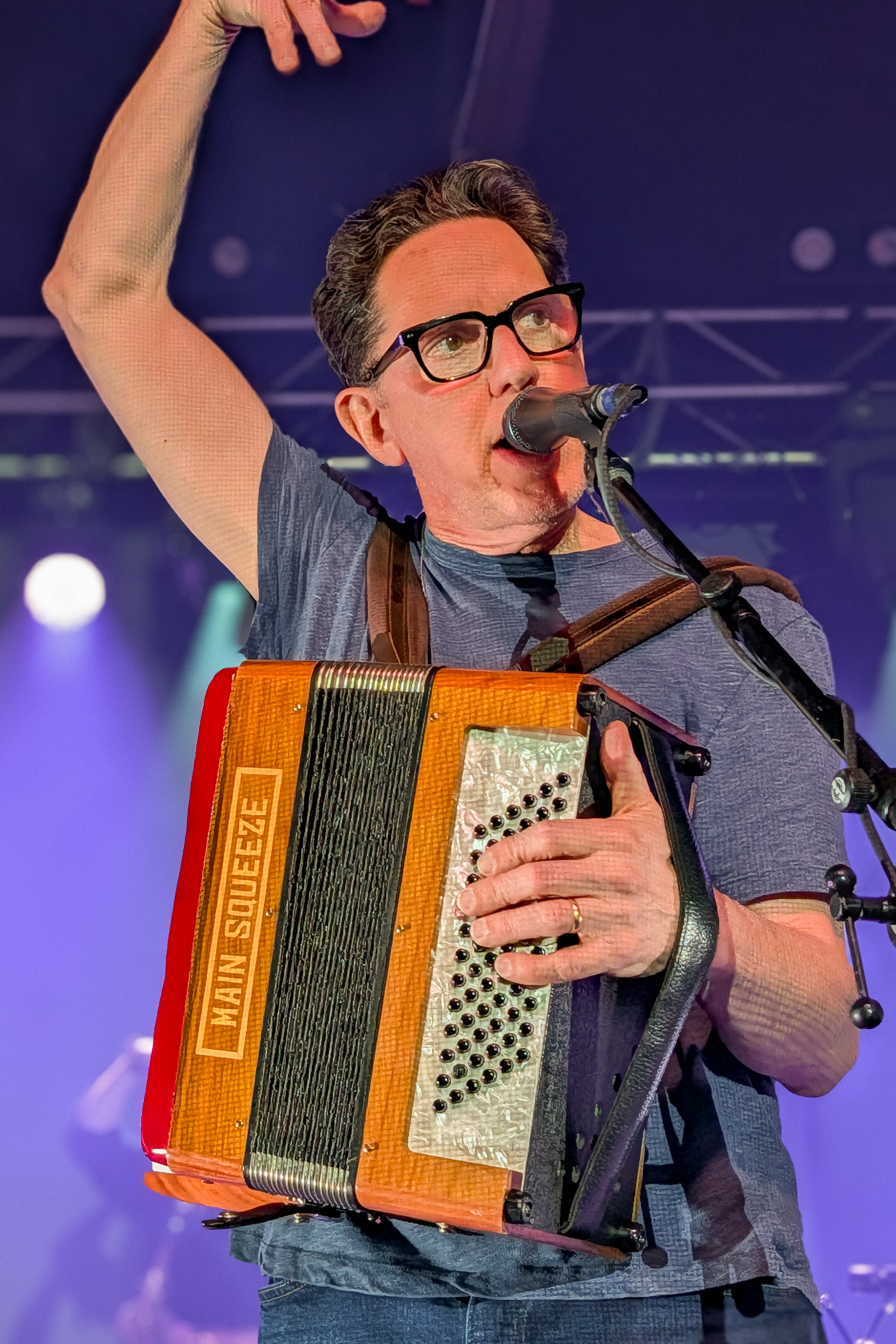
- Linnell in 2025

Background information
- Born: John Sidney Linnell; June 12, 1959 (age 67); New York City, U.S.
- Genre: Alternative rock
- Occupations: Musician; singer-songwriter
- Instruments: Vocals; accordion; keyboards; saxophone; clarinet; bass; guitar; harmonica; autoharp; banjo; stylophone; marxophone
- Years active: 1976–present
- Labels: Bar/None; Elektra; Restless; Idlewild
- Spouse: Karen Brown (m. 1997)
- Awards: List of awards

John Sidney Linnell (/lɪˈnɛl/ lih-NEL; born June 12, 1959) is an American musician, multi-instrumentalist, singer-songwriter and a co-founder of alternative rock band They Might Be Giants with John Flansburgh, which was formed in 1982. In addition to singing and songwriting, he plays keyboard, accordion, baritone and bass saxophone, and clarinet for the band.

Linnell's lyrics and music art includes strange subject matters and word play, while his music is backed up with generally happy and upbeat melodies.

== Early life ==
John Linnell was born in New York City to Zenos Linnell (1925–2011), a psychiatrist, and Kathleen (née Glenn; 1926–2008). When Linnell was a child, Walt Kelly's Songs of the Pogo album made a strong impression on his musical sensibilities. The album contained lyrics that relied heavily on puns and word play, which Linnell appreciated. In particular, he recalls "Lines Upon a Tranquil Brow", which later became part of They Might Be Giants' live repertoire.

=== Education ===
At an early age, Linnell and his family relocated to Lincoln, Massachusetts, where he attended Lincoln-Sudbury Regional High School. There, he worked on the school newspaper, the Promethean, and met John Flansburgh. The two occasionally collaborated on home-recording projects.

Linnell studied English for a semester at the University of Massachusetts Amherst before dropping out to pursue a career in music.

== Life and musical career ==
=== Early work ===
In high school, Linnell played in a band called The Baggs. Prior to finding success in the alternative rock scene, Linnell was also involved with The Mundanes, a Rhode Island-based new wave band. Linnell played keyboards and saxophone for the group. Because of his unsatisfactory minor role in the band, and under the pressure of The Mundanes' unsuccessful search for a record deal, Linnell began leisurely recording music with John Flansburgh. His family did not support the transition from what they considered to be a more professional band to an experimental one.

=== Since 1982: They Might Be Giants ===
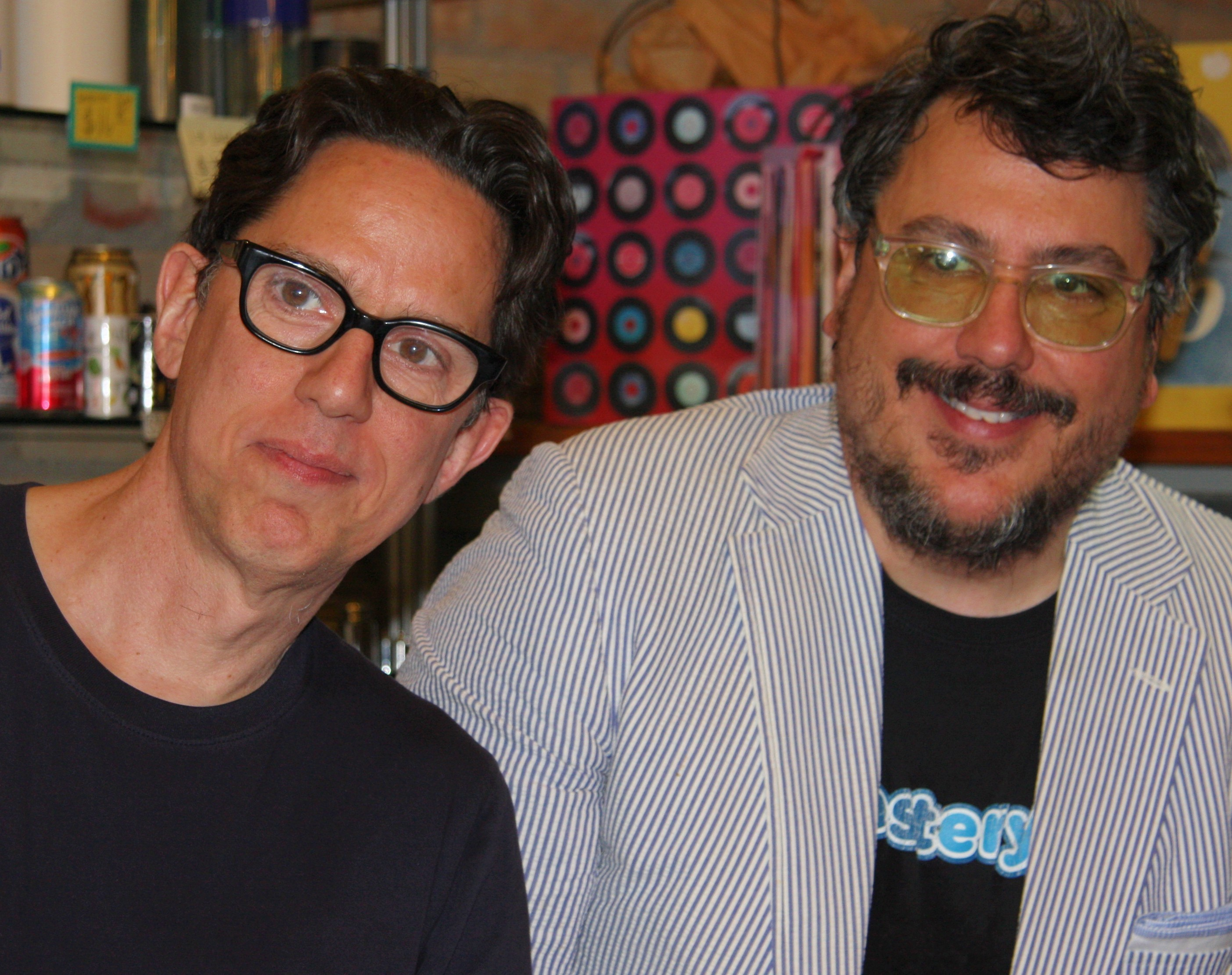
John Linnell (left) and John Flansburgh (right) in 2015

Linnell co-founded They Might Be Giants in 1982 with high school friend John Flansburgh. While the two split singing and songwriting duties roughly in half, Linnell's songs had the most commercial success in the band's early years. Singles like "Don't Let's Start" and "Ana Ng" introduced the band to college radio, and they made waves on the Billboard charts in 1990 with "Birdhouse in Your Soul". Linnell writes songs, sings, plays accordion, keyboards, and various woodwind instruments.

The lyrics of John Linnell's songs include strange word play and subject matter. Persistent themes include aging, bad relationships, death, and delusional behavior. Conversely to some of these dark themes, the accompanying melodies are sometimes cascading and upbeat.

Linnell described his role in the group during an interview for Splatter Effect in 1994:

I have a personal, a real obsession, with melody and harmony. I can really never get enough of that kind of thing. I don't think too much about the cultural context of what we're doing. I think John [Flansburgh] is more on that end of it. He thinks more in terms of the larger picture, the larger meaning of what we're doing. I'm more into the technical end: the chords and the rhythms and the melodies.

In 2005, the band began to produce a twice-monthly podcast. Early on, Linnell frequently contributed humorous spoken-word pieces to the program.

In a People magazine online poll, "The Most Beautiful People of 1998", he finished ninth with 4,189 votes.

=== Solo work ===
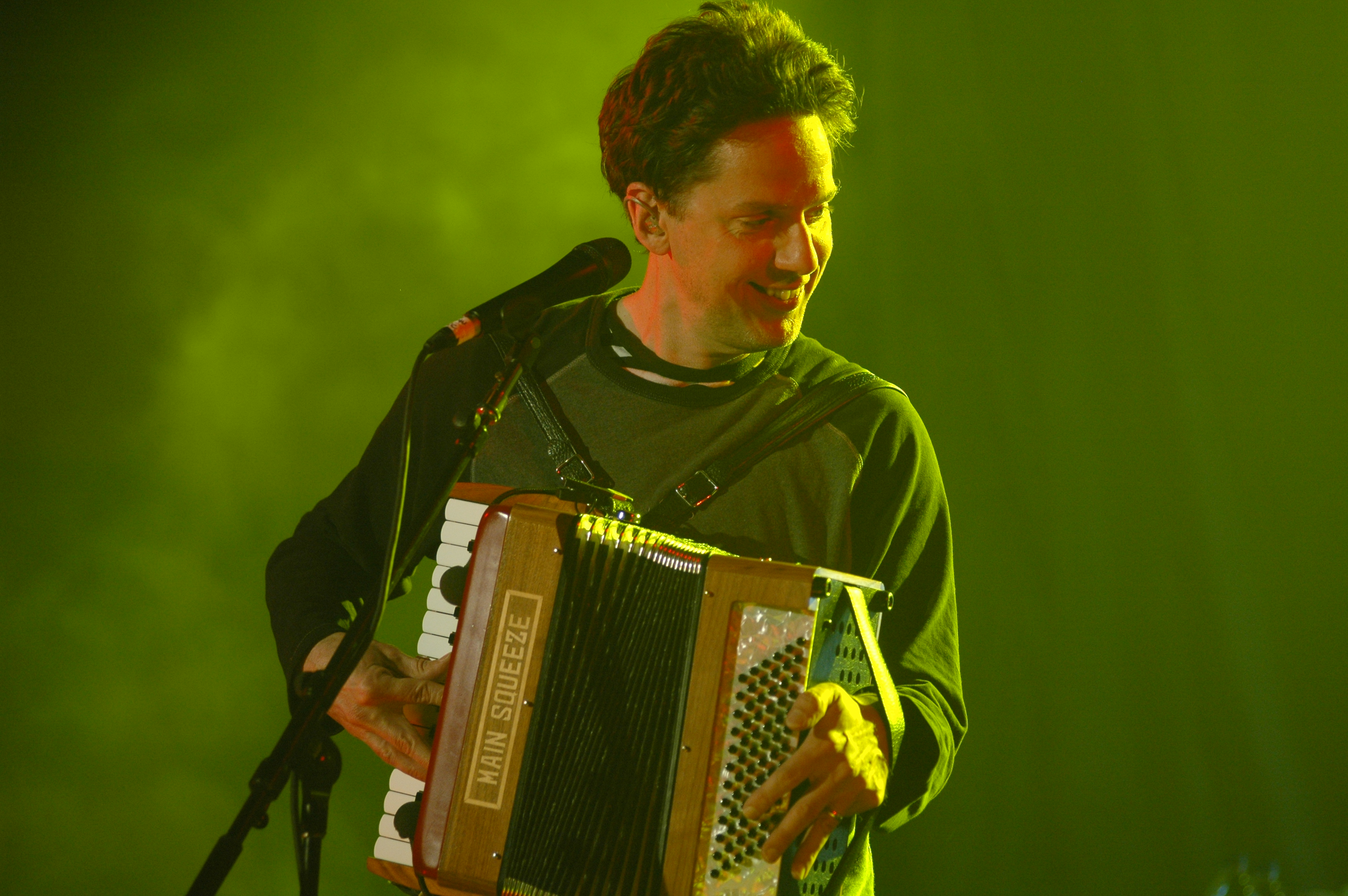
John Linnell playing accordion in 2008

Since 1994, Linnell has done some solo work: In that year he released the State Songs EP, which he expanded to a full-length album in 1999. The concept of the State Songs project is intentionally misleading: U.S. states feature prominently in the title and chorus of each song, but have very little to do with their actual narratives.

Other side-projects include the limited-release House of Mayors EP in 1996 through the Hello CD of the Month Club and in 1997 a flexi disc of the song "Olive the Other Reindeer" accompanying promotional copies of the children's books, Olive, the Other Reindeer. Linnell has also appeared as a guest musician on a number of musical efforts by other artists.

Linnell provided the singing voice for the Other Father character in the 2009 film Coraline, for which They Might Be Giants wrote the "Other Father Song", included on the film's soundtrack.

In 2021, Linnell released a four-song EP containing songs sung entirely in Latin, titled Roman Songs.

In 2024, he collaborated with Michael Hearst on a cover of the song "Tele-Tele-Telephone" by Wazmo Nariz for Hearst's project, 80 From The 80s.

=== Marriage ===
Linnell married Karen Brown in 1997. They have one son, Henry, who was born in 1998 and appeared as a performer on They Might Be Giants' children's albums Here Come the ABCs and Here Come the 123s, as well as Roman Songs.
