= John Flansburgh =

American musician (born 1960)

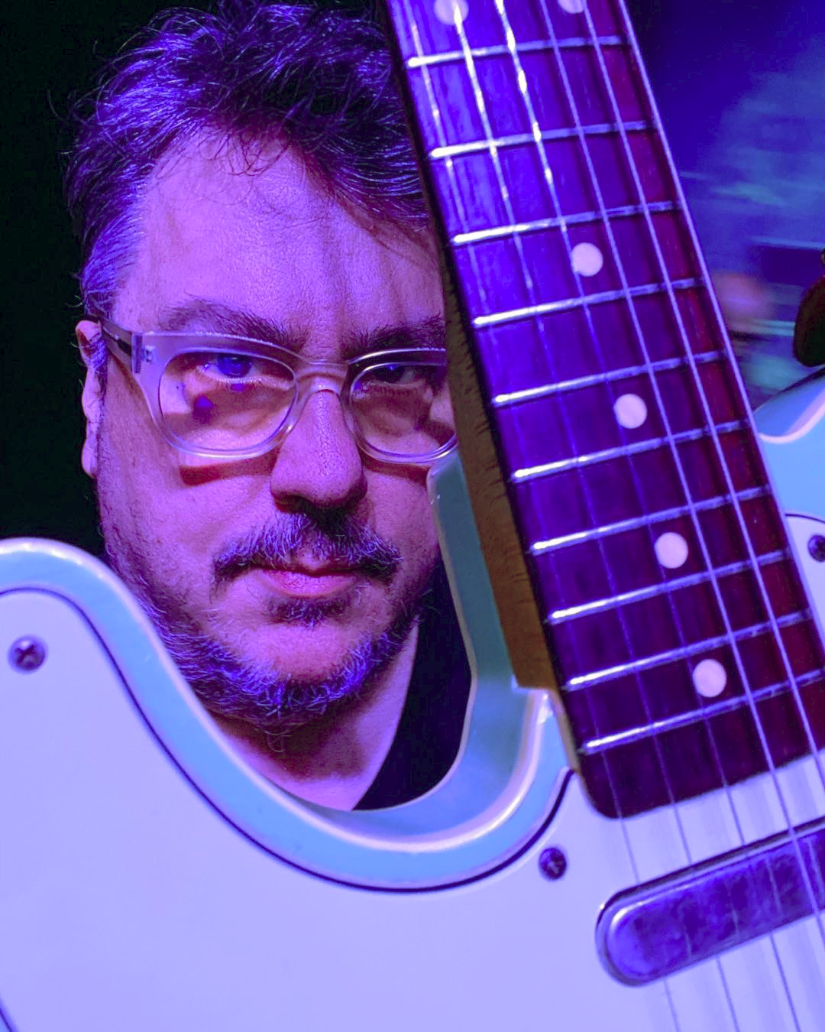
- Flansburgh in 2023

Background information
- Also known as: Rolf Conant
- Born: John Conant Flansburgh; May 6, 1960 (age 66); Lexington, Massachusetts, U.S.
- Genre: Alternative rock
- Occupations: Singer-songwriter, musician, guitarist
- Instruments: Vocals; guitar; bass; percussion; trumpet; harmonica
- Years active: 1982–present
- Labels: Bar/None; Elektra; Restless; Idlewild
- Spouse: Robin Goldwasser (m. 1996)
- Awards: List of awards

John Conant Flansburgh (Note: Pronounced /flænzˌbərɡ/ FLANZ-berg. Colloquially known by his nicknames Flansy (/flænzi/ FLANZ-ee) or Flans (/flænz/ FLANZ).) (born May 6, 1960) is an American musician and singer-songwriter and a co-founder of alternative rock band They Might Be Giants with John Linnell, which was formed in 1982. He is a lead writer and singer and plays rhythm guitar for the band.

Flansburgh also founded and was the lead singer of the band Mono Puff. He has directed music videos for various artists and produced Jonathan Coulton's 2011 studio album Artificial Heart.

== Life and music career ==
=== Childhood and education ===
Flansburgh was born in Lexington, Massachusetts. His father, Earl Flansburgh, was a Boston architect. His mother, Louise "Polly" (née Hospital), is the founder and president of Boston By Foot. His brother, Paxus Calta (born Earl Schuyler Flansburgh), is an anti-nuclear activist. John Flansburgh attended Lincoln-Sudbury Regional High School where he met future band member John Linnell.

Flansburgh attended the George Washington University, where he learned to play guitar while working as a parking garage attendant. He then attended Antioch College and Pratt Institute, where he graduated with an arts degree.

=== Formation of They Might Be Giants ===
Flansburgh and close friend John Linnell united in 1981 after moving to Brooklyn to start their music career. They began performing with Flansburgh on guitar and Linnell on other instruments backed by a drum machine. They formed They Might Be Giants.

=== Marriage ===
Flansburgh has been married to Robin Goldwasser since 1996, with whom he occasionally performs. Later in 2004, as a one-off, Flansburgh produced and starred in Off-Broadway musical People Are Wrong!, which was co-written with her.

=== Early side projects ===
==== Mono Puff ====
Flansburgh made a solo band Mono Puff during his off-time from They Might Be Giants. The side band's bassist was Hal Cragin and drummer was Steve Calhoon. Mono Puff released two albums, Unsupervised (1996) and It's Fun to Steal (1998), in addition to four EPs and one single.

==== Other side projects ====
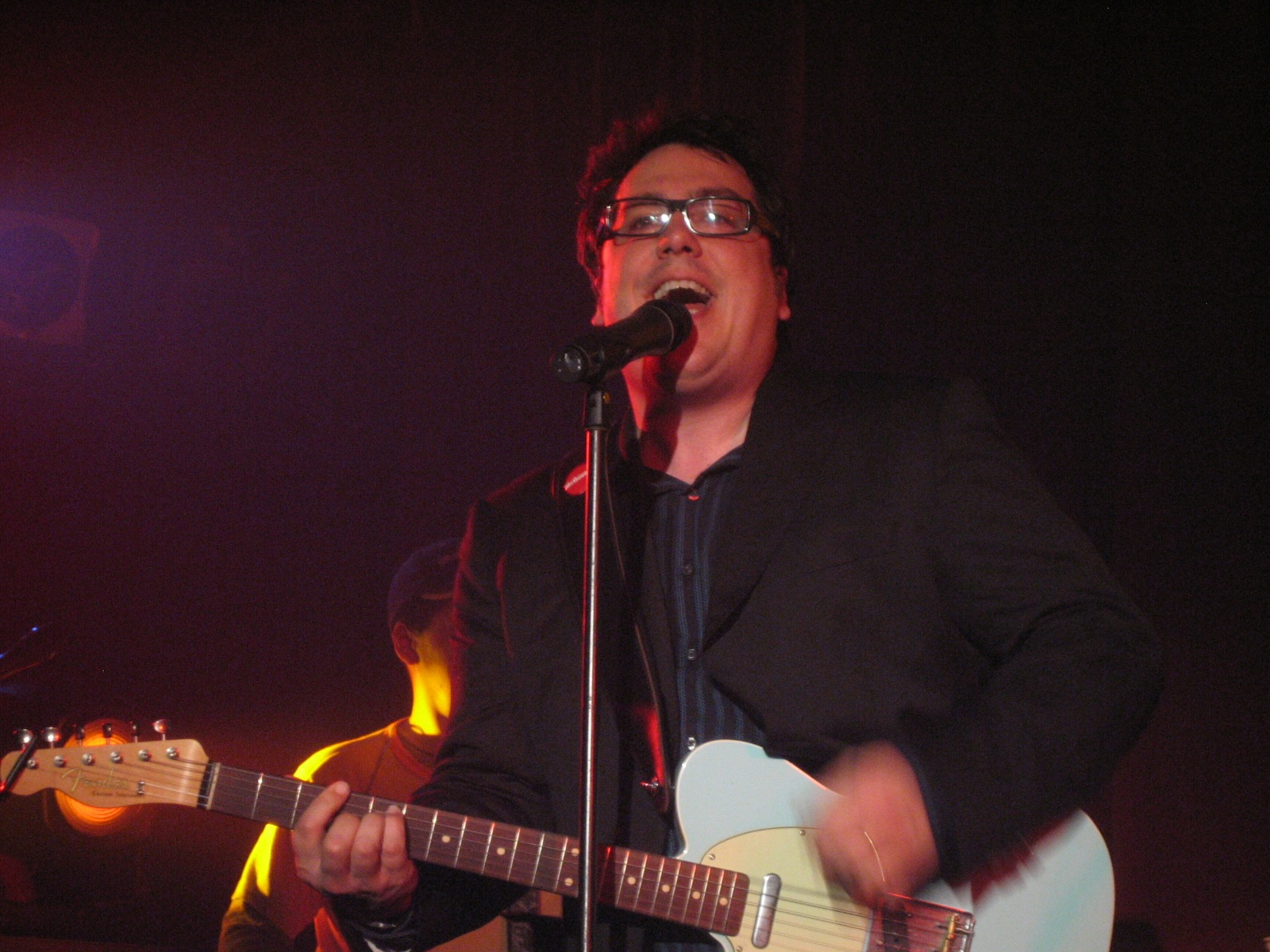
Flansburgh performing in 2005

Flansburgh ran a subscription-based record label called the Hello CD of the Month Club. He has also directed music videos for artists such as Soul Coughing, Ben Folds Five, Frank Black and the Catholics, Harvey Danger, and Jonathan Coulton. He also produced Coulton's album, Artificial Heart.

In 1998, Flansburgh guest-starred as himself in the season 4 finale of the Cartoon Network animated series Space Ghost Coast to Coast. In 2004, Flansburgh created and hosted a series on WNYC entitled Now Hear This. The program spotlighted a variety of his musical interests, featuring interviews with artists such as Stephin Merritt, David Byrne, Matt Stone, and The Darkness. While no longer in production, it continues to be archived on the station's website. In 2007, Flansburgh played a short role as "Computer" in the Adult Swim comedy series Xavier: Renegade Angel.

=== Car accident ===
They Might Be Giants
(@tmbg)
tweeted:

John L. here. [...] Mr. John Flansburgh was in a rather serious car accident on his way home from the gig. The initial report is that he has seven broken ribs, several of which have multiple fractures. The good news is that no vital organs were involved and the long-term prognosis seems positive. Of course, there will be a lengthy recovery process.

June 9, 2022

On June 8, 2022, while in a rideshare on his way home from a They Might Be Giants show at the Bowery Ballroom, Flansburgh's ride was involved in a collision with a drunk driver. Flansburgh had several broken ribs, many of which had multiple fractures, but none of his vital organs were damaged. The tour resumed months later after Flansburgh recuperated.

=== Solo EP ===
In 2023, he released the solo EP Forest/Trees, which was released under his name.

== Political views ==
Flansburgh considers himself politically leftist. He has spoken of his support for Bernie Sanders for President.

== Music style ==
Often times, the music style of Flansburgh's songs are described as quirky. They tend to be about good or bad relationships and sometimes surreal topics. The melodies that accompany his eclectic lyrics are usually unique and unconventional. Death is another subject of John Flansburgh's early songs. He said in an interview about his and his band's music, "[Death]'s not just a theme—it's the Swiss army knife of songwriting".

== Instruments ==
Flansburgh frequently plays a red Gibson ES-335, a sonic blue Fender Telecaster, a candy apple red Fender Jazzmaster, and a goldtop Gibson Les Paul. He owns a custom-made golden Mojo guitar, known as the "Chessmaster". He designed the guitar himself, taking inspiration from the geometric shapes of old guitar cases. Flansburgh is left-handed.
