= They Might Be Giants discography =

- Studio albums: 24
- Extended plays: 25
- Live albums: 20
- Compilation albums: 18
- Singles: 40
- Video albums: 19

The following is the discography of American alternative rock band They Might Be Giants. It consists of John Linnell and John Flansburgh and backing artists Marty Beller, Dan Miller, Danny Weinkauf, Dan Levine, Stan Harrison, and Mark Pender.

They Might Be Giants' first release was the 1986 album eponymously titled They Might Be Giants, though the band did not gain commercial success until their 1990 single "Birdhouse in Your Soul" from the album Flood. "Birdhouse in Your Soul" reached #3 on the United States Modern Rock Tracks chart and #6 on the UK Singles Chart and remains the band's highest-charting single in both countries. Their latest release is The World Is to Dig.

Over the last four decades of the band, They Might Be Giants has released a total of 24 studio albums along with 25 extended plays, 20 live albums, 18 compilation albums, and 40 singles.

== Studio albums ==
| Number | Year | Title | Chart peaks | | | | | | | Certifications (sales thresholds) | Notes |
| Number | Year | Title | US | US Alt | US Kids | US Indie | US Rock | AUS | UK | Certifications (sales thresholds) | Notes |
|---|---|---|---|---|---|---|---|---|---|---|---|
| 1. | 1986 | They Might Be Giants: Release date: November 4, 1986; Label: Bar/None / Restless; Format: Cassette, CD, LP | — | — | — | — | — | 159 | — | | Debut album |
| 2. | 1988 | Lincoln: Release date: September 25, 1988; Label: Bar/None / Restless; Format: Cassette, CD, LP | 89 | — | — | — | — | 116 | — | | |
| 3. | 1990 | Flood: Release date: January 15, 1990; Label: Elektra; Format: Cassette, CD, LP | 75 | — | — | — | — | 99 | 14 | RIAA: Platinum; BPI: Gold | Major label debut |
| 4. | 1992 | Apollo 18: Release date: March 24, 1992; Label: Elektra; Format: Cassette, CD, LP | 99 | — | — | — | — | 59 | — | | |
| 5. | 1994 | John Henry: Release date: September 13, 1994; Label: Elektra; Format: Cassette, CD, LP | 61 | — | — | — | — | 132 | — | | First album with a backing band |
| 6. | 1996 | Factory Showroom: Release date: October 8, 1996; Label: Elektra; Format: Cassette, CD, LP | 89 | — | — | — | — | 116 | — | | |
| 7. | 1999 | Long Tall Weekend: Release date: July 19, 1999; Label: eMusic; Format: Digital download, promo CD, LP | — | — | — | — | — | — | — | | Download-only album, released on eMusic.com; First full-length download-only album released by a major artist in history |
| 8. | 2001 | Mink Car: Release date: September 11, 2001; Label: Restless; Format: CD, digital download, LP | 134 | — | — | — | — | 102 | — | | |
| 9. | 2002 | No!: Release date: June 11, 2002; Label: Idlewild/Rounder; Format: Enhanced CD, digital download | — | — | 1 | — | — | — | — | | First children's album |
| 10. | 2004 | The Spine: Release date: July 13, 2004; Label: Idlewild/Zoë; Format: CD, digital download, LP | 130 | — | — | — | — | — | — | | |
| 11. | 2005 | Here Come the ABCs: Release date: February 15, 2005; Label: Idlewild/Disney Sound; Format: CD, digital download, DVD, LP | — | — | 6 | — | — | — | — | | Second children's album; Major label children's album debut |
| 12. | 2007 | The Else: Release date: July 10, 2007; Label: Idlewild/Zoë; Format: CD, digital download, LP | 118 | — | — | — | — | — | — | | The CD release included a bonus disc, Cast Your Pod to the Wind |
| 13. | 2008 | Here Come the 123s: Release date: February 5, 2008; Label: Idlewild/Disney Sound; Format: Digital download, DVD/CD, LP | 172 | — | 9 | — | — | — | — | | Third children's album; Their first album to win a Grammy Award |
| 14. | 2009 | Here Comes Science: Release date: September 8, 2009; Label: Idlewild/Disney Sound; Format: CD/DVD, digital download | 91 | 23 | 4 | — | 34 | — | — | | Fourth children's album |
| 15. | 2011 | Join Us: Release date: July 19, 2011; Label: Idlewild/Rounder; Format: CD, digital download, LP | 32 | 8 | — | 8 | 8 | — | — | | First "rock" album since 2007 |
| 16. | 2013 | Nanobots: Release date: March 5, 2013; Label: Idlewild, Lojinx; Format: CD, digital download, LP | 57 | 13 | — | 10 | 19 | — | — | | |
| 17. | 2015 | Glean: Release date: April 21, 2015; Label: Idlewild; Format: CD, digital download, LP | 67 | 6 | — | 5 | 7 | — | — | | Composed entirely of songs from the band's 2015 Dial-A-Song project |
| 18. | 2015 | Why?: Release date: November 27, 2015; Label: Idlewild; Format: CD,digital download, LP | 181 | 12 | — | 6 | 15 | — | — | | Fifth children's album; Composed largely of songs from the band's 2015 Dial-A-Song project |
| 19. | 2016 | Phone Power: Release date: June 10, 2016; Label: Idlewild; Format: CD, digital download, LP | 122 | 8 | — | 11 | 14 | — | — | | Composed entirely of songs from the band's 2015 Dial-A-Song project |
| 20. | 2018 | I Like Fun: Release date: January 19, 2018; Label: Idlewild; Format: CD, digital download, LP | 108 | 8 | — | 3 | 17 | — | — | | Composed entirely of songs from the band's 2018 Dial-A-Song project |
| 21. | 2018 | My Murdered Remains: Release date: December 10, 2018; Label: Idlewild; Format: CD, digital download, LP | — (Note: My Murdered Remains did not enter the Billboard 200 but peaked at number 68 on the Top Current Albums chart.) | — | — | 9 | — | — | — | | Composed entirely of songs from the band's 2018 Dial-A-Song project; Included bonus disc composed mostly of songs from the band's 2015 Dial-A-Song project |
| 22. | 2018 | The Escape Team: Release date: December 10, 2018; Label: Idlewild; Format: CD, digital download, LP | — (Note: The Escape Team did not enter the Billboard 200 but peaked at number 71 on the Top Current Albums chart.) | — | — | 10 | — | — | — | | Composed largely of songs from the band's 2018 Dial-A-Song project |
| 23. | 2021 | Book: Release date: November 12, 2021; Label: Idlewild; Format: 8-track, CD, cassette, digital download, LP | 88 | 7 | — | 14 | 10 | — | — | | |
| 24. | 2026 | The World Is to Dig: Release date: April 14, 2026; Label: Idlewild; Format: CD, cassette, digital download, LP | — | — | — | — | — | — | — | | |

== Live albums ==
| Number | Year | Title | Chart peaks | | Notes |
| Number | Year | Title | US | AUS | Notes |
|---|---|---|---|---|---|
| 1. | 1990 | 4/28/90 Cabaret Metro, Chicago: Release date: 1990; Label: Atlantic | — | — | |
| 2. | 1994 | Live!! New York City 10/14/94: Release date: November 1994; Label: Elektra | — | — | Released as a promotional CD; Distributed to members of the Hello Recording Club |
| 3. | 1996 | Kit Kat Acoustic Break: Release date: 1996 | — | — | |
| 4. | 1998 | Severe Tire Damage: Release date: August 11, 1998; Label: Restless | 186 | 108 | First major live album |
| 5. | 1999 | Live: Release date: November 23, 1999; Label: BMG Special Products | — | — | Condensed version of Severe Tire Damage |
| 6. | 2001 | TMBG Unlimited - The Flood Show: Release date: March 1, 2001; Label: They Might Be Records | — | — | |
| 7. | 2001 | TMBG Unlimited - The Ritz Show: Release date: May 4, 2001; Label: They Might Be Records | — | — | |
| 8. | 2004 | The Spine Hits the Road: Release date: August 31, 2004; Label: Idlewild | — | — | Download only; exclusive to the iTunes Store |
| 9. | 2004 | Almanac: Release date: December 10, 2004; Label: Idlewild | — | — | Download-only album |
| 10. | 2004 | Venue Songs: Release date: December 10, 2004; Label: Idlewild | — | — | Download-only album |
| 11. | 2012 | At Large: Release date: August 2012; Label: Idlewild | — | — | Distributed to members of the They Might Be Giants Instant Fan Club |
| 12. | 2014 | First Album Live: Release date: July 2014; Label: Idlewild | — | — | Released as a free digital download through NoiseTrade |
| 13. | 2015 | Flood Live in Australia: Release date: February 25, 2015; Label: Idlewild | — | — | Released as a free digital download through their website |
| 14. | 2015 | Live in Berlin: Release date: July 2015 | | | Released to the members of the They Might Be Giants Instant Fan Club |
| 15. | 2016 | Live in Brooklyn: Release date: July 19, 2016; Label: Idlewild | — | — | Distributed to members of the They Might Be Giants Instant Fan Club |
| 16. | 2018 | 2018 Live: Release date: December 4, 2018; Label: Idlewild | — | — | Distributed to members of the They Might Be Giants Instant Fan Club |
| 17. | 2020 | Asbury Park Live: Release date: March 10, 2022; Label: Idlewild | — | — | |
| 18. | 2020 | Live At The Music Hall Of Williamsburg 11.29.15: Release date: November 19, 2020; Label: Idlewild | — | — | |
| 19. | 2024 | Beast of Horns: Release date: July 15, 2024; Label: Idlewild | — | — | Distributed to members of the They Might Be Giants Instant Fan Club |
| 20. | 2025 | Flood Live in America: Release date: November 18, 2025; Label: Idlewild | — | — | Released as a digital download through their website |

== Compilation albums ==
| Number | Year | Title | Chart peaks | | Notes |
| Number | Year | Title | US Current | US Indie | Notes |
|---|---|---|---|---|---|
| 1. | 1989 | Don't Let's Start: Label: Rough Trade/One Little Indian | — | — | B-side and rarities collection; Released exclusively in Europe |
| 2. | 1991 | Miscellaneous T: Release date: October 8, 1991; Label: Restless/Bar/None; Format: CD, Cassette | — | — | US version of Don't Let's Start |
| 3. | 1997 | Then: The Earlier Years: Release date: March 25, 1997; Label: Restless | — | — | Collects the band's first two studio albums and early rarities and B-sides |
| 4. | 1999 | Best of the Early Years: Release date: November 23, 1999; Label: BMG Special Products | — | — | Condensed version of Then: The Earlier Years |
| 5. | 1999 | Giants Jubilee: Release date: February 1999; Label: Goodnoise | — | — | Shortened version of Disc 1 of Then: The Earlier Years |
| 6. | 1999 | Mightathon: Release date: February 1999; Label: Goodnoise | — | — | Shortened version of Disc 2 of Then: The Earlier Years |
| 7. | 2002 | They Got Lost: Release date: July 23, 2002; Label: Idlewild, Zoë | — | — | Rarities collection, including some songs from Long Tall Weekend |
| 8. | 2002 | Dial-A-Song: 20 Years of They Might Be Giants: Release date: September 17, 2002; Label: Rhino | — | — | Best-of compilation |
| 9. | 2005 | A User's Guide to They Might Be Giants: Release date: May 3, 2005; Label: Rhino | — | — | Condensed version of Dial-A-Song: 20 Years of They Might Be Giants |
| 10. | 2005 | Venue Songs DVD/CD: Release date: November 11, 2005; Label: Idlewild | — | — | Collection of "venue songs": songs the band wrote about various venues in which they performed |
| 11. | 2007 | Cast Your Pod to the Wind: Release date: July 10, 2007; Label: Idlewild/Zoë | — | — | Released as a bonus disc with CD copies of The Else; Compilation of songs previously released through the band's podcast |
| 12. | 2011 | Album Raises New and Troubling Questions: Release date: October 28, 2011; Label: Idlewild | — | — | Rarities collection, including five music videos; Part of the July 26, 2012 Humble Music Bundle |
| 13. | 2013 | Flood + Apollo 18: Release date: December 10, 2013; Label: Edsel | — | — | |
| 14. | 2013 | John Henry + Factory Showroom: Release date: December 10, 2013; Label: Edsel | — | — | |
| 15. | 2014 | Idlewild: Release date: May 27, 2014; Label: Idlewild, Lojinx | — | — | Contains 17 songs released between 1999 and 2013 |
| 16. | 2015 | 50,000,000 They Might Be Giants Songs Can't Be Wrong: Release date: October 16, 2015; Label: Breakaway | — | — | Does not contain 50 million songs |
| 17. | 2020 | Modern: Release date: April 15, 2020; Self-released | — | — | Download-only release to raise funds for band and crew after COVID-19 pandemic tour postponements |
| 18. | 2024 | The Spine Surfs Alone: Rarities 1998-2005: Release date: November 19, 2024; Label: Idlewild | — | — | Rarities collection, including songs from the EPs The Spine Surfs Alone and Working Undercover for the Man, select songs from the live album Severe Tire Damage, and various other rarities |

== EPs ==
| Number | Year | Title | Chart peaks |
| Number | Year | Title | US Indie |
|---|---|---|---|
| 1. | 1987 | Don't Let's Start: Release date: November 2, 1987; Label: Bar/None | — |
| 2. | 1988 | (She Was A) Hotel Detective: Release date: May 5, 1988; Label: Bar/None | — |
| 3. | 1989 | They'll Need a Crane: Release date: February 10, 1989; Label: Bar/None/Restless | — |
| 4. | 1989 | Birdhouse in Your Soul: Release date: February 1, 1990; Label: Elektra/WEA | — |
| 5. | 1990 | Istanbul (Not Constantinople): Release date: June 5, 1990; Label: Elektra | — |
| 6. | 1992 | The Statue Got Me High: Release date: February 3, 1992; Label: Elektra/WEA | — |
| 7. | 1992 | I Palindrome I: Release date: May 5, 1992; Label: Elektra | — |
| 8. | 1992 | The Guitar (The Lion Sleeps Tonight): Release date: July 30, 1992; Label: Elektra | — |
| 9. | 1993 | Why Does the Sun Shine? (The Sun Is a Mass of Incandescent Gas): Release date: September 14, 1993; Label: Elektra; Format: CD | — |
| 10. | 1994 | Back to Skull: Release date: August 16, 1994; Label: Elektra; Format: CD | — |
| 11. | 1996 | S-E-X-X-Y: Release date: November 26, 1996; Label: Elektra | — |
| 12. | 2000 | Working Undercover for the Man: Release date: May 16, 2000; Label: eMusic; Format: Digital download, limited CD release | — |
| 13. | 2001 | Man, It's So Loud in Here: Release date: August 2001; Label: Restless | — |
| 14. | 2001 | They Might Be Giants In... Holidayland: Release date: November 6, 2001; Label: Restless; Format: CD | — |
| 15. | 2003 | Bed, Bed, Bed: Release date: 2003; Label: Simon & Schuster; Format: Book with CD | — |
| 16. | 2004 | Indestructible Object: Release date: April 4, 2004; Label: Barsuk; Format: CD | 36 |
| 17. | 2004 | The Spine Surfs Alone: Release date: 2004; Label: Idlewild; Format: CD | — |
| 18. | 2011 | Other Thing Brass Band: Release date: 2011; Label: Idlewild; Format: Vinyl, download | — |
| 19. | 2011 | Join Us (Four Advance Tracks): Release date: April 26, 2011; Label: Idlewild | — |
| 20. | 2012 | Four Covers: Release date: August 2012; Label: Idlewild; Format: Vinyl | — |
| 21. | 2013 | Nanobots EP: Release date: 2013; Label: Idlewild/Megaforce; Format: Download only | — |
| 22. | 2013 | The Avatars of They: Release date: August 2013; Label: Idlewild | — |
| 23. | 2016 | Songs for Chop: Release date: June 2016; Label: Chop Shop; Format: Download only | — |
| 24. | 2021 | The Pamphlet EP: Release date: 2021; Label: Idlewild; Format: Download | — |
| 25. | 2026 | Eyeball: Release date: January 15, 2026; Label: Idlewild; Format: Download | — |

== Singles ==
| Number | Title | Year | Peak chart positions | | | | Certifications | Album |
| Number | Title | Year | US Alt. | AUS | NLD | UK | Certifications | Album |
|---|---|---|---|---|---|---|---|---|
| 1. | "Don't Let's Start" | 1987 | — | 94 | — | — | | They Might Be Giants |
| 2. | "(She Was A) Hotel Detective" | 1988 | — | — | — | — | | They Might Be Giants |
| 3. | "Ana Ng" | 1988 | 11 | 154 | — | — | | Lincoln |
| 4. | "They'll Need a Crane" | 1989 | — | — | — | — | | Lincoln |
| 5. | "Purple Toupee" | 1989 | — | — | — | — | | Lincoln |
| 6. | "Birdhouse in Your Soul" | 1990 | 3 | 125 | — | 6 | BPI: Silver | Flood |
| 7. | "Twisting" | 1990 | 22 | — | — | — | | Flood |
| 8. | "Istanbul (Not Constantinople)" | 1990 | — | — | — | 61 | | Flood |
| 9. | "The Statue Got Me High" | 1992 | 24 | 155 | — | 92 | | Apollo 18 |
| 10. | "The Guitar (The Lion Sleeps Tonight)" | 1992 | — | — | — | — | | Apollo 18 |
| 11. | "I Palindrome I" | 1992 | — | — | — | — | | Apollo 18 |
| 12. | "O Tannenbaum" | 1993 | — | — | — | — | | Non-album single |
| 13. | "Snail Shell" | 1994 | 19 | — | — | — | | John Henry |
| 14. | "S-E-X-X-Y" | 1996 | — | — | — | — | | Factory Showroom |
| 15. | "Doctor Worm" | 1998 | — | — | — | — | | Severe Tire Damage |
| 16. | "Boss of Me" | 2001 | — | 29 | 89 | 21 | | Music from Malcolm in the Middle |
| 17. | "Man, It's So Loud in Here" | 2001 | — | 86 | — | — | | Mink Car |
| 18. | "Experimental Film" | 2005 | — | — | — | — | | The Spine |
| 19. | "T-Shirt" | 2005 | — | — | — | — | | Non-album single |
| 20. | "I'm Impressed" | 2007 | — | — | — | — | | The Else |
| 21. | "Can't Keep Johnny Down" | 2011 | — | — | — | — | | Join Us |
| 22. | "Never Knew Love" | 2011 | — | — | — | — | | Join Us |
| 23. | "Cloisonné" | 2011 | — | — | — | — | | Join Us |
| 24. | "Old Pine Box" | 2011 | — | — | — | — | | Join Us |
| 25. | "You're on Fire" | 2013 | — | — | — | — | | Nanobots |
| 26. | "Erase" | 2015 | — | — | — | — | | Glean |
| 27. | "I Left My Body" | 2017 | — | — | — | — | | I Like Fun |
| 28. | "The Communists Have the Music" | 2018 | — | — | — | — | | My Murdered Remains |
| 29. | "I Lost Thursday" | 2020 | — | — | — | — | | Book |
| 30. | "Who Are the Electors?" | 2020 | — | — | — | — | | Non-album single |
| 31. | "I Broke My Own Rule" | 2021 | — | — | — | — | | Book |
| 32. | "I Can't Remember the Dream" | 2021 | — | — | — | — | | Book |
| 33. | "Super Cool" | 2021 | — | — | — | — | | Book |
| 34. | "Part of You Wants to Believe Me" | 2021 | — | — | — | — | | Book |
| 35. | "Lazy" | 2024 | — | — | — | — | | Non-album single |
| 36. | "stelluB" | 2024 | — | — | — | — | | Non-album single |
| 37. | "Wu-Tang" | 2026 | — | — | — | — | | The World Is to Dig |
| 38. | "Sleep's Older Sister" | 2026 | — | — | — | — | | The World Is to Dig |
| 39. | "Outside Brain" | 2026 | — | — | — | — | | The World Is to Dig |
| 40. | "Overnight Sensation (Hit Record)" | 2026 | — | — | — | — | | The World Is to Dig |
"—" denotes a recording that did not chart or was not released in that territory.

=== Other certified songs ===
| Title | Year | Certifications | Album |
|---|---|---|---|
| "Mickey Mouse Clubhouse Theme" | 2006 | RIAA: Platinum | Mickey Mouse Clubhouse Soundtrack |
| "Hot Dog!" | 2006 | RIAA: Platinum | Mickey Mouse Clubhouse Soundtrack |

== Videography ==
| Number | Year | Title | Certifications (sales thresholds) |
|---|---|---|---|
| 1. | 1988 | Bar/None Records Video Reel: Release date: 1988; Label: Bar/None | |
| 2. | 1989 | Information Club Video Collection: Release date: 1989; Label: Bar/None | |
| 3. | 1989 | The Videos 1986-1989: Release date: 1989; Label: Enigma Music Video / Bar/None | |
| 4. | 1990 | The Story So Far: Release date: 1990; Label: Elektra | |
| 5. | 1990 | Flood Promo: Release date: 1990; Label: Elektra | |
| 6. | 1990 | Apollo 18 Retail Promo: Release date: 1992; Label: Elektra | |
| 7. | 1991 | Video Compilation: Release date: November 1991; Label: Restless Music Videos | |
| 8. | 1995 | They Might Be Giants Compilation: Release date: 1995; Label: The Hornblow Group | |
| 9. | 1999 | Direct from Brooklyn: Release date: April 27, 1999; Label: Restless; Format: VHS, DVD | |
| 10. | 2001 | Malcolm Spot - The Tonight Show: Release date: 2001; Label: Restless | |
| 11. | 2003 | Gigantic (A Tale of Two Johns): Release date: March 10, 2003; Label: Cowboy Pictures, Plexifilm (USA); Format: DVD | |
| 12. | 2005 | Here Come the ABCs: Release date: February 15, 2005; Label: Disney Sound/Idlewild; Format: DVD | RIAA: Gold |
| 13. | 2005 | Venue Songs DVD/CD: Release date: November 11, 2005; Label: Idlewild; Format: DVD | |
| 14. | 2008 | Here Come the 123s: Release date: February 5, 2008; Label: Disney Sound/Idlewild; Format: DVD | RIAA: Gold |
| 15. | 2009 | Installing & Servicing Melody: Release date: 2009; Label: The Hornblow Group | |
| 16. | 2009 | Here Comes Science: Release date: September 1, 2009; Label: Disney Sound/Idlewild; Format: DVD | RIAA: Gold |
| 17. | 2012 | Them Ain't Big Eye Ants: Release date: December 3, 2012; Label: Idlewild; Format: DVD | |
| 18. | 2015 | Video Jail: Release date: April 17, 2015; Label: Idlewild | |
| 19. | 2015 | Live in Berlin: Release date: July 2015; Label: Idlewild; Format: DVD | |
