= Direct from Brooklyn =

- Directed by: Adam Bernstein; John Flansburgh; Nico Beyer
- Produced by: Adam Bernstein; They Might Be Giants
- Music by: They Might Be Giants
- Distributed by: Restless Records
- Release dates: April 27, 1999 (VHS); February 18, 2003 (DVD)
- Running time: 39 minutes (VHS); 44 minutes (DVD)
- Country: United States
- Language: English

Direct from Brooklyn is a compilation of music videos by American alternative rock group They Might Be Giants. It was released on VHS in 1999 and DVD in 2003. The title refers to the home of John Linnell and John Flansburgh, founding members of the band. Many of the music videos were filmed in Brooklyn and other parts of New York City.

== Video listing ==
The music videos run in reverse chronological order, from "Doctor Worm" (1999) to "Put Your Hand Inside the Puppet Head" (1986) with the exception of the last two videos, which are from 1991.

1. "Doctor Worm"
2. "Snail Shell" (Note: The DVD includes commentary for each video, with the exception of "Snail Shell". The commentary track of "Snail Shell" is a recording of "Complete Paranoia", a song they wrote around 1983 and 2 decades later had decided to do an improvised version of.)
3. "The Guitar (The Lion Sleeps Tonight)"
4. "The Statue Got Me High"
5. "Istanbul (Not Constantinople)" (Note: The official animated video commissioned by Elektra Records.)
6. "Birdhouse In Your Soul"
7. "They'll Need A Crane"
8. "Purple Toupee"
9. "Ana Ng"
10. "(She Was A) Hotel Detective"
11. "Don't Let's Start" (Note: The version of "Don't Let's Start" heard in the music video is the mix from the "Don't Let's Start" single.)
12. "Put Your Hand Inside The Puppet Head"
13. "Particle Man" (Note: An animated music video with partnership with Looney Tunes spin-off Tiny Toon Adventures.)
14. "Istanbul (Not Constantinople; Reprise)" (Note: An animated music video with partnership with Looney Tunes spin-off Tiny Toon Adventures.)

=== DVD bonus tracks ===
==== Video ====
15. Why Does The Sun Shine? (live from the 2002 tour)

==== Audio tracks ====
16. All MacGyver On It (Note: "All MacGyver On It" was previously only available on foreign copies of Mink Car.)
17. Your Mom's Alright (Note: "Your Mom's Alright" was previously only available on foreign copies of Mink Car.)
18. Man, It's So Loud in Here (Hot 2002 Remix)
