= They Might Be Giants (disambiguation) =

They Might Be Giants is an American alternative rock band.

They Might Be Giants is also the name of:

- They Might Be Giants (album), their self-titled debut album, also known as The Pink Album
- They Might Be Giants (film), a 1971 film by Anthony Harvey
- "They Might Be Giants", a song from their 1990 album Flood

== See also ==
- They Might Be Giants discography
