= Severe Tire Damage (album) =

Live album by They Might Be Giants
- Released: August 11, 1998
- Recorded: 1994–1998
- Genre: Alternative rock
- Labels: Restless (U.S.); Cooking Vinyl (U.K.)

They Might Be Giants chronology
Then: The Earlier Years (1997)	Severe Tire Damage (1998)	Long Tall Weekend (1999)

Professional ratings
Review scores
Source	Rating
AllMusic	2.5/5 stars
The Encyclopedia of Popular Music	2/5 stars
The Rolling Stone Album Guide	2/5 stars
The Village Voice	B+

Severe Tire Damage is a primarily live album by American alternative rock band They Might Be Giants, released in 1998. It also features a few studio tracks, including a new single ("Doctor Worm").

The live cuts, some recorded at soundchecks without any audience, feature at least one track from every album since their debut, which include older works that have been reworked since the duo adopted a full backing band. Songs like "She's an Angel", from their debut album, They Might Be Giants, and "Birdhouse in Your Soul", from their major label debut, Flood, have been changed from the larger band. Conversely, the song "Meet James Ensor" originally appeared on their first full-band album, John Henry (1994) and surfaces here in a bare-bones rendition, with only vocals and an accordion.

A condensed version of this album was released as Live, which featured 10 of the 24 tracks of Severe Tire Damage.

== Song notes ==
- Tracks 1, 2, and 17 were recorded in a studio rather than onstage; track 15 was recorded in a hotel room.
- Tracks 18–24 are hidden songs that were improvised in concert, based on the Planet of the Apes movie series.
- "First Kiss" was later reworked and put on the 2001 album Mink Car as "Another First Kiss", with the same basic melody and similar lyrics but a substantially different style and tempo.
- "About Me" stops at 0:41 and is followed by 2 minutes of silence, to "bury" the Planet of the Apes tracks.
- Similarly, "They Got Lost" had prior been recorded in the studio at a slower tempo, which would be released on Long Tall Weekend as well as later being the title track on the rarities compilation album They Got Lost.
- On Track 3, "They Get Lost", the band is introduced incorrectly as "They Must Be Giants", which is a tongue-in-cheek reference to an untitled, partial recording that appears as track 13 on both Don't Let's Start and its re-release Miscellaneous T. It was inadvertently left on the Dial-A-Song answering machine, in which a confused listener named Gloria talks to an unknown third party about the mystery of "There May Be Giants" and "There Must Be Giants", as she mistakenly refers to the band. It would later be referenced when Bryant Gumbel referred to them as "They Must Be Giants" when they performed "Your Racist Friend" on Today to promote the release of Flood.

== Song origins ==
- Studio version of track 4 originally appeared on the Why Does The Sun Shine? (The Sun Is a Mass of Incandescent Gas) EP (1993)
- Studio versions of tracks 5, 8 and 12 originally appeared on Flood (1990)
- Studio version of track 6 originally appeared on They Might Be Giants (1986)
- Studio versions of tracks 7, 14 and 16 originally appeared on Factory Showroom (1996). The studio version of track 3 was also recorded for said album but would be held back and would later appear on Long Tall Weekend (1999).
- Studio version of track 9 originally appeared on Lincoln (1988)
- Studio versions of tracks 11 and 13 originally appeared on Apollo 18 (1992)
- Studio version of track 15 originally appeared on John Henry (1994)

== Track listing ==
All songs by They Might Be Giants unless otherwise noted. Tracks 18–24 are hidden tracks.

No.	Title	Length
1.	"Doctor Worm"	3:01
2.	"Severe Tire Damage Theme"	0:40
3.	"They Got Lost"	3:42
4.	"Why Does the Sun Shine? (The Sun Is a Mass of Incandescent Gas)" (Written by Hy Zaret and Lou Singer)	2:17
5.	"Birdhouse in Your Soul"	3:12
6.	"She's An Angel"	3:20
7.	"XTC vs. Adam Ant"	3:39
8.	"Istanbul (Not Constantinople)" (Nat Simon/Jimmy Kennedy)	3:07
9.	"Ana Ng"	3:00
10.	"First Kiss"	1:36
11.	"Spider"	0:53
12.	"Particle Man"	2:09
13.	"She's Actual Size"	2:18
14.	"S-E-X-X-Y"	3:06
15.	"Meet James Ensor"	1:30
16.	"Till My Head Falls Off"	2:54
17.	"About Me"	3:01 (Note: The actual "About Me" stops at 0:41 and is followed by 2:20 of silence.)
18.	"Planet of the Apes"	2:35
19.	"Return to the Planet of the Apes"	2:46
20.	"Conquest of the Planet of the Apes"	1:40
21.	"Escape from the Planet of the Apes"	1:08
22.	"Battle for the Planet of the Apes"	2:00
23.	"Beneath the Planet of the Apes"	2:00
24.	"This Ape's for You"	1:13
Total length:		56:41

== Charts ==
Chart performance for Severe Tire Damage
Chart (1998)	Peak position
Australian Albums (ARIA)	108
