= Miscellaneous T =

Compilation album by They Might Be Giants
- Released: October 8, 1991
- Recorded: 1986–1989
- Studios: Studio Pass, New York City; Dubway Studio, New York City; Charles Eller Studio, Charlotte, VT, Hello Studio, New York City
- Genre: Alternative rock
- Length: 37:47
- Label: Restless/Bar/None
- Producers: Bill Krauss, They Might Be Giants

They Might Be Giants chronology
Flood (1990)	Miscellaneous T (1991)	Apollo 18 (1992)

Professional ratings
Review scores
Source	Rating
AllMusic	4/5 stars
Robert Christgau	(choice cut)
The Encyclopedia of Popular Music	3/5 stars
MusicHound Rock: The Essential Album Guide	3/5 stars
The Rolling Stone Album Guide	3/5 stars
Spin Alternative Record Guide	7/10

Miscellaneous T is a B-side and remix compilation album released by American alternative rock band They Might Be Giants in 1991. It is a US re-release of Don't Let's Start (which was only released in the UK and West Germany), with different cover art, track order, and the additional song "Hello Radio".

The album consists of all of the B-sides from the singles the band released between 1987 and 1989 (except "Ana Ng"), with the addition of the relatively new songs "The World's Address (Joshua Fried Remix)"—released beforehand only on Don't Let's Start—and "Hello Radio", which was previously released on a promotional sampler.

All of the songs, with the exception of "(She Was A) Hotel Detective (Single Mix)", are included on Then: The Earlier Years, a compilation of the band's early material.

Miscellaneous T is said to be named for the section in record stores where They Might Be Giants' albums were most often shelved in the band's early years.

== Critical reception ==
Trouser Press called the compilation a "neat if uneven appendix to the longplaying oeuvre." The Spin Alternative Record Guide wrote that it "reveals TMBG's enormous depth of material."

== Song notes ==
The tracks are grouped according to the singles they originally appeared with:

- 1–3: "Purple Toupee" (unreleased)
- 5–7: "They'll Need a Crane"
- 9–14: "(She Was A) Hotel Detective"
- 15–18: "Don't Let's Start"

The 13th track, which has no name listed on the album's track listing, is not a song, but a snippet of a recording inadvertently left on the TMBG Dial-A-Song answering machine, in which a confused listener named Gloria talks to two unknown third parties about the mystery of "There May Be Giants" and "There Must Be Giants", as she mistakenly refers to the band.

"Lady Is a Tramp" is a cover of a song from the Rodgers and Hart musical Babes in Arms.

== Track listing ==
All songs by They Might Be Giants unless otherwise noted.

Side one

No.	Title	Length
1.	"Hey, Mr. DJ, I Thought You Said We Had a Deal"	3:48
2.	"Lady Is a Tramp" (Lorenz Hart, Richard Rodgers)	1:20
3.	"Birds Fly"	1:25
4.	"The World's Address [Joshua Fried Remix]"	5:42
5.	"Nightgown of the Sullen Moon"	1:59
6.	"I'll Sink Manhattan"	2:32
7.	"It's Not My Birthday"	1:52
8.	"Hello Radio"	0:56
9.	"Mr. Klaw"	1:19

Side two

No.	Title	Length
10.	"Kiss Me, Son of God [Alternate Version]"	1:52
11.	"The Biggest One"	1:22
12.	"For Science"	1:19
13.	"untitled"	2:33
14.	"(She Was A) Hotel Detective [Single Mix]"	2:20
15.	"The Famous Polka"	1:33
16.	"When It Rains It Snows"	1:33
17.	"We're the Replacements"	1:50
18.	"Don't Let's Start [Single Mix]"	2:34
