= Then: The Earlier Years =

Compilation album by They Might Be Giants
- Released: March 25, 1997
- Recorded: 1983–1991
- Genre: Alternative rock
- Label: Restless (U.S., UK); Rykodisc (UK)
- Producer: Bill Krauss, Matthew Hill, They Might Be Giants

They Might Be Giants chronology
Factory Showroom (1996)	Then: The Earlier Years (1997)	Severe Tire Damage (1998)

Professional ratings
Review scores
Source	Rating
Allmusic	4.5/5 stars
The A.V. Club	(average)
Entertainment Weekly	B+
Pitchfork Media	9.5/10
The Rolling Stone Album Guide	3/5 stars

Then: The Earlier Years is a double album compilation by American alternative rock band They Might Be Giants, released in 1997. Then contains the band's first two studio albums, 1986's They Might Be Giants and 1988's Lincoln, in their entirety, as well as the 1991 B-side compilation Miscellaneous T, in addition to a few unreleased songs from their 1985 Demo Tape and other songs previously unreleased. The cover art is by Tony Millionaire. The compilation Best of the Early Years is a heavily condensed version of this release (a single disc and only 10 tracks).

== Song origins ==
- Tracks 1–3 and 5–19 on disc one are originally from They Might Be Giants
- Tracks 1–18 on disc two are originally from Lincoln
- Track 4, the single mix of "Don't Let's Start," was taken from Miscellaneous T; in the original release of They Might Be Giants, a different mix of this song appeared as the fourth track on the album
- Tracks 20–27 on disc one and tracks 19–26 on disc two are from Miscellaneous T, although that itself was a compilation of B-sides, so the tracks originally appeared on various singles and EPs
- Tracks 34 and 35 from disc one and tracks 31 and 32 from disc two are originally from the 1985 Demo Tape
- Tracks 28–33 and 36 on disc one and tracks 27–30 and 33–36 on disc two are previously unreleased

== Track listing ==
All songs are by They Might Be Giants unless otherwise noted.

=== Disc one ===
1. "Everything Right Is Wrong Again" – 2:20
2. "Put Your Hand Inside the Puppet Head" – 2:12
3. "Number Three" – 1:27
4. "Don't Let's Start" (Single Mix) – 2:35
5. "Hide Away Folk Family" – 3:21
6. "32 Footsteps" – 1:36
7. "Toddler Hiway" – :25
8. "Rabid Child" – 1:31
9. "Nothing's Gonna Change My Clothes" – 1:58
10. "(She Was A) Hotel Detective" – 2:10
11. "She's an Angel" – 2:37
12. "Youth Culture Killed My Dog" – 2:51
13. "Boat of Car" – 1:15
14. "Absolutely Bill's Mood" – 2:38
15. "Chess Piece Face" – 1:21
16. "I Hope That I Get Old Before I Die" – 1:58
17. "Alienation's for the Rich" – 2:25
18. "The Day" – 1:27
19. "Rhythm Section Want Ad" – 2:22
20. "We're the Replacements" – 1:50
21. "When It Rains It Snows" – 1:33
22. "The Famous Polka" – 1:33
23. "Untitled" - 2:33
24. "For Science" – 1:19
25. "The Biggest One" – 1:22
26. "Kiss Me, Son of God" (Alternate Version) – 1:49
27. "Mr. Klaw" – 1:19
28. "Critic Intro" – 1:37
29. "Now That I Have Everything" – 2:20
30. "Mainstream U.S.A." – 1:15
31. "Fake Out in Buenos Aires" – 1:48
32. "Greek #3" – 1:29
33. "I Hope That I Get Old Before I Die" (Original Version) – 1:12
34. "I'm Def" – 1:08
35. "Don't Let's Start" (Demo Version) – 1:14
36. "'85 Radio Special Thank You" – 1:25

=== Disc two ===
1. "Ana Ng" – 3:23
2. "Cowtown" – 2:21
3. "Lie Still, Little Bottle" – 2:06
4. "Purple Toupee" – 2:40
5. "Cage & Aquarium" – 1:10
6. "Where Your Eyes Don't Go" – 3:06
7. "Piece of Dirt" – 2:00
8. "Mr. Me" – 1:52
9. "Pencil Rain" – 2:42
10. "The World's Address" – 2:24
11. "I've Got a Match" – 2:36
12. "Santa's Beard" – 1:55
13. "You'll Miss Me" – 1:53
14. "They'll Need a Crane" – 2:33
15. "Shoehorn With Teeth" – 1:13
16. "Stand on Your Own Head" – 1:16
17. "Snowball in Hell" – 2:31
18. "Kiss Me, Son of God" – 1:54
19. "Hello Radio" – 0:55
20. "It's Not My Birthday" – 1:52
21. "I'll Sink Manhattan" – 2:32
22. "Nightgown of the Sullen Moon" – 1:59
23. "World's Address" (Joshua Fried Remix) – 5:42
24. "Hey, Mr. DJ, I Thought You Said We Had a Deal" – 3:48
25. "Lady Is A Tramp" (Rodgers and Hart) – 1:20
26. "Birds Fly" – 1:25
27. "Kitten Intro" – 1:43
28. "Weep Day" – 1:50
29. "The Big Big Whoredom" – 1:39
30. "I'm Gettin' Sentimental Over You" (Bassman, Washington) – 1:59
31. "Become a Robot" – 1:18
32. "Which Describes How You're Feeling" – 1:24
33. "Swing Is a Word" – 0:53
34. "Doris Cunningham" – 0:12
35. "Counterfeit Fake" – 0:39
36. "Schoolchildren Singing 'Particle Man'" – 2:05
