= Space suit (disambiguation) =

A space suit is a system of garments for use in outer space.

Space suit may also refer to:

- A song from They Might Be Giants' 1992 album Apollo 18
- The pilot episode of Mickey Mouse Clubhouse
