= The Spine (album) =

Studio album by They Might Be Giants
- Released: July 5, 2004
- Recorded: 2003 ("Memo To Human Resources", "Au Contraire"); January–April 2004
- Studio: Kampo Studios, Manhattan; Skyline Studios, Manhattan; Collyer Brothers Studio, Brooklyn; Hello Studio, Brooklyn
- Genre: Alternative rock; indie rock; art rock
- Length: 35:54
- Label: Idlewild/Zoë (US); Cooking Vinyl (UK); Shock Records (AU)
- Producer: Pat Dillett

They Might Be Giants chronology
Indestructible Object (2004)	The Spine (2004)	Almanac (2004)

The Spine is the tenth studio album by American alternative rock band They Might Be Giants. The album was released on July 5, 2004 in the United Kingdom, and July 13 in the United States. The album was released alongside a companion EP, The Spine Surfs Alone. It was preceded by the Indestructible Object EP, which featured two tracks that appear on The Spine.

== Promotion ==
Three music videos were produced for The Spine. The first, a Flash-animated video for "Experimental Film", was created in conjunction with The Brothers Chaps, and features characters from their animated series Homestar Runner. An animated music video for "Bastard Wants to Hit Me" appears on the DVD for Venue Songs. The video was directed by Aaron Sorenson and Courtney Booker of Laika. The video was nominated for the Annie Award for "Best Animated Television Commercial" in 2005. A music video for "Damn Good Times" was animated with previous band collaborator Divya Srinivasan.

== Track listing ==
All tracks are written by They Might Be Giants, unless otherwise noted.

No.	Title	Length
1.	"Experimental Film"	2:56
2.	"Spine"	0:33
3.	"Memo to Human Resources"	2:02
4.	"Wearing a Raincoat"	3:10
5.	"Prevenge"	2:44
6.	"Thunderbird"	2:38
7.	"Bastard Wants to Hit Me"	2:14
8.	"The World Before Later On"	1:52
9.	"Museum of Idiots"	3:02
10.	"It's Kickin' In"	2:01
11.	"Spines"	0:30
12.	"Au Contraire"	2:26
13.	"Damn Good Times"	2:38
14.	"Broke in Two"	2:59
15.	"Stalk of Wheat"	1:27
16.	"I Can't Hide from My Mind"	2:43
17.	"Renew My Subscription (Note: Bonus track for digital and vinyl)"	2:18

== Reception ==
Professional ratings
Aggregate scores
Source	Rating
Metacritic	(59/100)
Review scores
Source	Rating
AllMusic	3/5 stars
The A.V. Club	C
Blender	3/5 stars
The Guardian	1/5 stars
NME	(5/10)
Pitchfork Media	(5.3/10)
PopMatters	8/10 stars
Q	3/5 stars
Rolling Stone	3/5 stars
Tiny Mix Tapes	2/5 stars
In Music We Trust	(favorable)

The Spine received mixed reviews from critics. Writing for AllMusic, Heather Phares found that the band had already exhausted the album's best content on the preceding EP, Indestructible Object. Phares concluded that the album contained a few engaging hooks, but was overall inconsistent. Josh Modell of The AV Club berated the album's lack of "idiosyncrasies", and reported that The Spine was generally unsurprising. Contrarily, Patrick Schabe of PopMatters lauded the album for its uncharacteristically traditional rock arrangements.
