= Venue Songs =

2004 live album by They Might Be Giants

Live album by They Might Be Giants
- Released: December 10, 2004
- Recorded: July 9 – September 30, 2004
- Genre: Alternative rock
- Length: 48:20
- Label: Idlewild Records

They Might Be Giants chronology
Almanac (2004)	Venue Songs (2004)	Here Come the ABCs (2005)

Venue Songs is a 2004 live album by American alternative rock band They Might Be Giants. At each stop of their 2004 tour, They Might Be Giants wrote, arranged and performed a new song dedicated to that venue.

Initially, the album was only released in MP3 format from They Might Be Giants' online music store and could be purchased during the 2004 holiday season. It is now available on They Might Be Giants' online music store in MP3 or FLAC format for purchase by itself.

In 2005, Venue Songs was re-released as a CD/DVD combo. It included studio versions of some of the venue songs, and other non-album tracks. The DVD includes music videos for some of the venue songs as well as other bonus videos.

== Track listing ==
No.	Title	Length
1.	"Celebrate Brooklyn"	1:30
2.	"Starr Hill Music Hall"	1:55
3.	"Sokol Auditorium"	1:13
4.	"Houston-Meridian Theme"	1:35
5.	"T-H-E-G-A-R-A-G-E"	1:11
6.	"Richard's On Richards"	2:00
7.	"The Stone Pony"	1:05
8.	"The Egg"	1:21
9.	"Leeds Irish Center"	2:01
10.	"Anaheim House of Blues"	1:04
11.	"House of Blues"	2:09
12.	"The Blue Note"	1:35
13.	"The Catalyst"	2:03
14.	"First Avenue Stage"	0:51
15.	"Mr. Small's Theatre"	1:22
16.	"City Limits"	1:55
17.	"Fillmore"	1:01
18.	"Gibson Lounge"	1:13
19.	"Music Farm"	1:06
20.	"Trees"	0:44
21.	"West Hollywood House of Blues"	1:41
22.	"Variety Playhouse"	2:04
23.	"The Downtown"	1:04
24.	"Toad's Place"	1:41
25.	"At The As-tore-eye-yea"	1:19
26.	"Lincoln Theater"	1:41
27.	"Recher Theatre"	2:52
28.	"Mississippi Nights"	1:16
29.	"T.L.A."	1:33
30.	"Stubbs"	2:45
31.	"The Orange Peel"	1:30
Total length:		48:20

Notes

- Some tracks are recorded from their respective show's soundcheck, rather than the show itself.
- New York City's Irving Plaza venue song was not included on this release, and no song was written for Nashville, even though it had a date on the tour.
- While the official track names on the compilation are the cities in which songs were performed in, they are referred to by the venue names on setlists.

== DVD/CD combo ==
Venue Songs DVD/CD

Compilation album by They Might Be Giants
- Released: November 11, 2005
- Recorded: 2003–2005
- Genre: Alternative rock
- Length: 1:09:36
- Label: Idlewild Records

They Might Be Giants chronology
A User's Guide to They Might Be Giants (2005)	Venue Songs DVD/CD (2005)	The Else (2007)

Venue Songs DVD/CD is a compilation album released in 2005 by They Might Be Giants on their own label, Idlewild Records. The bulk of the material comes from 2004's Venue Songs, which is included in here in its entirety, although its order has been rearranged. Venue Songs was composed of original live songs about the venue they were playing in at the time. They wrote a song for each of the venues in about a day. This album includes new studio recorded versions of 11 of the venue songs, as well as other non-album songs recorded in the past year. The DVD contains a storyline about Venue Songs which integrates videos for some of the venue songs, and includes other bonus videos as well.

=== Story ===
A Deranged Millionaire (played by John Hodgman) approaches They Might Be Giants and challenges them to write a new song every day on their current tour, celebrating the unique characteristics of every venue in which they perform. If they do not accomplish this goal, they will forever lose the talisman that grants them their magical musical abilities.

=== Song notes ===
- Tracks 7 and 17–46 were previously released on Venue Songs
- "Love Is Eternity" was previously released exclusively as an MP3 through They Might Be Giants' online store
- "Renew My Subscription" was previously an iTunes Store exclusive bonus track for The Spine (2004)
- "Taste the Fame" was from an appearance by They Might Be Giants on the TV show Home Movies
- "Tippecanoe and Tyler Too" was previously released on the compilation album Future Soundtrack for America
- "Bloodmobile" was written for an exhibit at the Franklin Institute in Philadelphia. It was later released on their 2009 children's album Here Comes Science

=== Track listing ===
==== CD ====
No.	Title	Length
1.	"Dallas"	0:42
2.	"Albany"	1:27
3.	"Los Angeles"	1:42
4.	"Anaheim"	1:04
5.	"Vancouver"	1:44
6.	"Pittsburgh"	1:21
7.	"Asheville"	1:29
8.	"Glasgow"	1:06
9.	"Charlottesville"	1:50
10.	"Asbury Park"	0:50
11.	"Brooklyn"	1:15
12.	"Love Is Eternity"	2:05
13.	"Renew My Subscription"	2:18
14.	"Taste the Fame"	0:59
15.	"Tippecanoe and Tyler Too"	1:38
16.	"Bloodmobile"	2:22
17.	"Omaha (In Situ)"	1:12
18.	"Houston (In Situ)"	1:32
19.	"Leeds (In Situ)"	1:58
20.	"New Orleans (In Situ)"	2:06
21.	"Colombia (In Situ)"	1:35
22.	"Santa Cruz (In Situ)"	2:01
23.	"Minneapolis (In Situ)"	0:49
24.	"Tucson (In Situ)"	1:54
25.	"San Francisco (In Situ)"	0:59
26.	"Memphis (In Situ)"	1:10
27.	"Charleston (In Situ)"	1:04
28.	"Atlanta (In Situ)"	2:02
29.	"Farmingdale (In Situ)"	1:02
30.	"New Haven (In Situ)"	1:40
31.	"London (In Situ)"	1:16
32.	"Raleigh (In Situ)"	1:40
33.	"Towson (In Situ)"	2:43
34.	"St. Louis (In Situ)"	1:13
35.	"Philadelphia (In Situ)"	1:31
36.	"Austin (In Situ)"	2:43
37.	"Dallas (In Situ)"	0:42
38.	"Albany (In Situ)"	1:19
39.	"Los Angeles (In Situ)"	1:40
40.	"Anaheim (In Situ)"	1:03
41.	"Vancouver (In Situ)"	1:59
42.	"Pittsburgh (In Situ)"	1:20
43.	"Glasgow (In Situ)"	1:07
44.	"Charlottesville (In Situ)"	1:53
45.	"Asbury Park (In Situ)"	0:59
46.	"Brooklyn (In Situ)"	1:29
Total length:		1:09:36

==== DVD ====
1. Greeting from the Deranged Millionaire
2. The experiment begins
3. "Dallas"
4. A concrete shrine
5. "Albany"
6. Paradoxically
7. "Los Angeles"
8. An oasis of hooch
9. "Anaheim"
10. The great walled city
11. "Vancouver"
12. Monongahela
13. "Pittsburgh"
14. You can't go home again
15. "Asheville"
16. and so
17. "Glasgow"
18. Returning to the U.S.
19. "Charlottesville"
20. Skee-ball and saltwater taffy
21. "Asbury Park"
22. The tour nearly over
23. "Brooklyn"
24. Goodbye from the Deranged Millionaire
25. "Damn Good Times"
26. "Experimental Film"
27. "Bastard Wants to Hit Me"
28. "I'm All You Can Think About"
