= Shuffle play =

Mode to play songs in a random order

Shuffle play is a mode of music playback in which songs are played in a randomized order that is decided upon for all tracks at once. It is commonly found on CD players, digital audio players and media player software. Shuffle playback prevents repeated tracks, which makes it distinct from random playback, in which the next track is chosen at random after the last track has ended.

== In CD players ==
In a CD player one can only shuffle songs on that CD, or with some models that could hold more than one CD, shuffle the songs on all of those CDs. Some CDs have been designed for the shuffle feature on CD players, such as They Might Be Giants' Apollo 18. More modern CD players come with the shuffle feature.

== In media devices ==
Almost all software on computers has the shuffle feature including Windows Media Player and MediaMonkey. Most electronic devices including mobile phones and iPods have the shuffle feature and devices have even been created just for the shuffle feature, such as the Apple iPod Shuffle. Media devices and players can usually shuffle more than just albums: they can also shuffle all of an artist's music, all of the music in a certain genre, and even all songs on the device. Users can also create playlists of whatever songs they like and shuffle them.
