= Almanac (They Might Be Giants album) =

Live album by They Might Be Giants
- Released: December 10, 2004
- Recorded: August 14–October 2, 2004
- Genre: Alternative rock
- Length: 55:17
- Label: Idlewild Records

They Might Be Giants chronology
The Spine (2004)	Almanac (2004)	Venue Songs (2004)

Almanac is a 2004 live album by American alternative rock band They Might Be Giants. The album is composed of songs performed by the band over the course of their 2004 tour. It is only available on their band-operated music downloading website. It was made available for free download in 2023.

== Track listing ==
No.	Title	Length
1.	"Clap Your Hands"	1:58
2.	"Experimental Film"	2:56
3.	"John Lee Supertaster"	3:08
4.	"Particle Mo"	5:16
5.	"It's Kickin In"	1:54
6.	"Dr. Worm"	2:57
7.	"The Famous Polka"	1:32
8.	"Stalk of Wheat"	2:40
9.	"I Palindrome I"	2:22
10.	"Wicked Little Critta"	2:29
11.	"Bastard Wants to Hit Me"	2:22
12.	"Drink!"	3:04
13.	"Thunderbird"	2:51
14.	"Violin"	2:54
15.	"Damn Good Times"	3:11
16.	"Fingertips"	5:46
17.	"Robot Parade"	2:53
18.	"Thank You for Coming..."	1:24
19.	"End of the Tour"	3:37
Total length:		55:17
