= Indestructible Object =

EP by They Might Be Giants
- Released: April 4, 2004
- Recorded: 2003
- Genre: Alternative rock
- Length: 12:32
- Labels: Barsuk Records (U.S.); Shock Records (Australia)

They Might Be Giants chronology
They Got Lost (2002)	Indestructible Object (2004)	The Spine (2004)

Professional ratings
Review scores
Source	Rating
AllMusic	3/5 stars
Pitchfork	7.1/10
PopMatters	(average)
Robert Christgau	(choice cut)
Rolling Stone	2/5 stars

Indestructible Object is the sixth EP by American alternative rock band They Might Be Giants, released through Barsuk Records on April 4, 2004.

== Content ==
The EP's title comes from a famous work by Man Ray, also known as Object to Be Destroyed. "Am I Awake?" was the theme song for the TLC series Resident Life. The tracks "Memo to Human Resources" and a slightly different version of "Au Contraire" are featured on the band's tenth studio album, The Spine, which was released three months later. The track "Ant" is a re-recording of a B-side from two of their 1990 singles ("Istanbul (Not Constantinople)" and "Birdhouse in Your Soul"). "Caroline, No" is a cover of the Beach Boys' song of the same name from their 1966 album Pet Sounds.

== Track listing ==
All songs written by John Flansburgh and John Linnell, except where noted

No.	Title	Writer(s)	Length
1.	"Am I Awake?"		3:04
2.	"Memo To Human Resources"		2:03
3.	"Au Contraire"		2:26
4.	"Ant"		2:55
5.	"Caroline, No"	Brian Wilson, Tony Asher	2:05
Total length:			12:32

== Charts ==
Chart (2004)	Peak position
US Independent Albums (Billboard)	36
