= Names of Istanbul =

The city of Istanbul has been known by a number of different names. The most notable names besides the modern Turkish name are Byzantium, Constantinople, and Stamboul. Different names are associated with different phases of its history, with different languages, and with different portions of it.

== Names in historical sequence ==
=== Lygos ===
According to a brief remark in Pliny the Elder's Natural History, Byzantium was first known as Lygos. The origin and meaning of the name are unknown. It may have been the name of a Thracian settlement situated on the site of the later city near the point of the peninsula (Sarayburnu). Simon Zsolt has suggested it was etymologically related to the Greek name for the Ligures and derived from the Anatolian ethnonym Ligyes, a tribe that appears to have been neighbors to the Paphlagonians.

=== Byzantium ===
Byzantion (Ancient Greek: Βυζάντιον, romanized: Byzántion; Latin: Byzantium) was founded by Greek colonists from Megara in 667 BC. The name is believed to be of Thracian or Illyrian origin and thus to predate the Greek settlement. It may be derived from a Thracian or Illyrian personal name, Byzas. Ancient Greek legend refers to a legendary king of that name as the leader of the Megarean colonists and eponymous founder of the city.

Byzántios, plural. Byzántioi (Ancient Greek: Βυζάντιος, Βυζάντιοι; Latin: Byzantius) referred to Byzantion's inhabitants and Byzántios (Ancient Greek: Βυζάντιος; Latin: Byzantius) was an adjective, also used as an ethnonym for the people of the city and as a family name. In the Middle Ages, Byzántion was also a synecdoche for the eastern Roman Empire. (An ellipsis of Medieval Greek: Βυζάντιον κράτος, romanized: Byzántion krátos). Byzantinós (Medieval Greek: Βυζαντινός, Latin: Byzantinus) denoted an inhabitant of the empire. The Anglicization of Latin Byzantinus yielded "Byzantine", with 15th and 16th century forms including Byzantin, Bizantin(e), Bezantin(e), and Bysantin as well as Byzantian and Bizantian.

The name Byzantius and Byzantinus were applied from the 9th century to gold Byzantine coinage, reflected in the French besant (d'or), Italian bisante, and English besant, byzant, or bezant. The English usage, derived from Old French besan (pl. besanz), and relating to the coin, dates from the 12th century.

Later, the name Byzantium became common in the West to refer to the Eastern Roman Empire, whose capital was Constantinople. As a term for the east Roman state as a whole, Byzantium was introduced by the historian Hieronymus Wolf only in 1555, a century after the empire, whose inhabitants called it the Roman Empire (Medieval Greek: Βασιλεία τῶν Ῥωμαίων, romanized: Basileia tōn Rhōmaiōn, lit. 'kingdom of the Romans'), had ceased to exist.

=== Augusta Antonina ===
The city was briefly renamed Augusta Antonina (Greek: Αυγούστα Αντωνινή) for a brief period in the 3rd century AD. The Roman Emperor Septimius Severus (193–211) conferred the name in honor of his son Antoninus, the later Emperor Caracalla. The name remained in use during their lifetimes but was abandoned after their deaths and deification, when the city reverted to its former name, Byzantion.

=== New Rome ===
Before the Roman emperor Constantine the Great made the city the new eastern capital of the Roman Empire on May 11, 330, he undertook a major construction project, essentially rebuilding the city on a monumental scale, partly modeled after Rome. Names of this period included ἡ Νέα, δευτέρα Ῥώμη "the New, second Rome", Alma Roma Ἄλμα Ῥώμα, Βυζαντιάς Ῥώμη, ἑῴα Ῥώμη "Eastern Rome", Roma Constantinopolitana.

The Third Canon of the First Council of Constantinople (381) refers to the city as New Rome.

The term "New Rome" lent itself to East-West polemics, especially in the context of the Great Schism, when it was used by Greek writers to stress the rivalry with (the original) Rome. New Rome is also still part of the official title of the Patriarch of Constantinople.

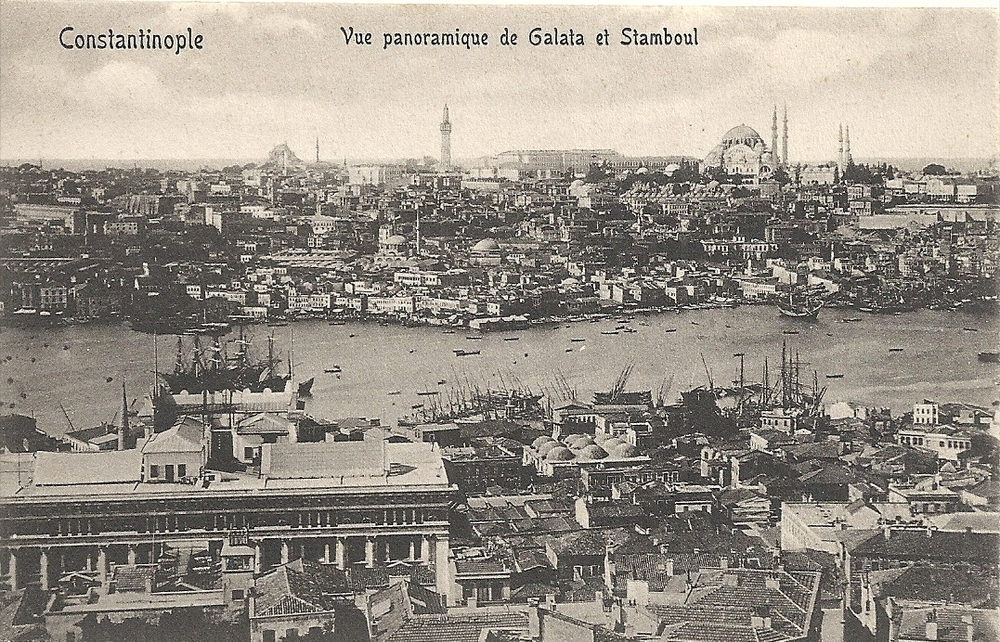
A postcard, c. 1905, refers to the city as Constantinople, and the inner city as Stamboul.

=== Constantinople ===
Kōnstantinoúpolis (Κωνσταντινούπολις), Constantinopolis in Latin and Constantinople in English, was the name by which the city became more widely known, in honor of Constantine the Great who established it as his capital. It is first attested in official use under Emperor Theodosius II (408–450). Stephanus of Byzantium mention both the terms Konstantinoupolis (Κωνσταντινούπολις) and Kostantinoupolis (Κωσταντινούπολις). Constantinopolis remained the principal official name of the city throughout the Byzantine period, and the most common name used for it in the West until the early 20th century.

This name was also used (including its Kostantiniyye variant) by the Ottoman Empire to describe the entire urban area of the city until the advent of the Republic of Turkey—the core Walled City was always Istambul for the Ottomans. According to Eldem Edhem, who wrote an encyclopedia entry on Istanbul for Encyclopedia of the Ottoman Empire, "many" Turkish members of the public as well as Turkish historians often perceive the use of Constantinople for the Ottoman city, despite being historically accurate, as being "politically incorrect".

=== Other Byzantine names ===
Besides Constantinople, the Byzantines referred to the city with a large range of honorary appellations, such as the "Queen of Cities" (Βασιλὶς τῶν πόλεων), also as an adjective, Βασιλεύουσα, the 'Reigning City'. In popular speech, the most common way of referring to it came to be simply the City (Greek: hē Polis /iˈpo.lis/, ἡ Πόλις, Modern Greek: i Poli, η Πόλη /i ˈpoli/ ). This usage, still current today in colloquial Greek and Armenian (Պոլիս, pronounced "Polis" or "Bolis" in the Western Armenian dialect prevalent in the city), also became the source of the later Turkish name, Istanbul (see below).

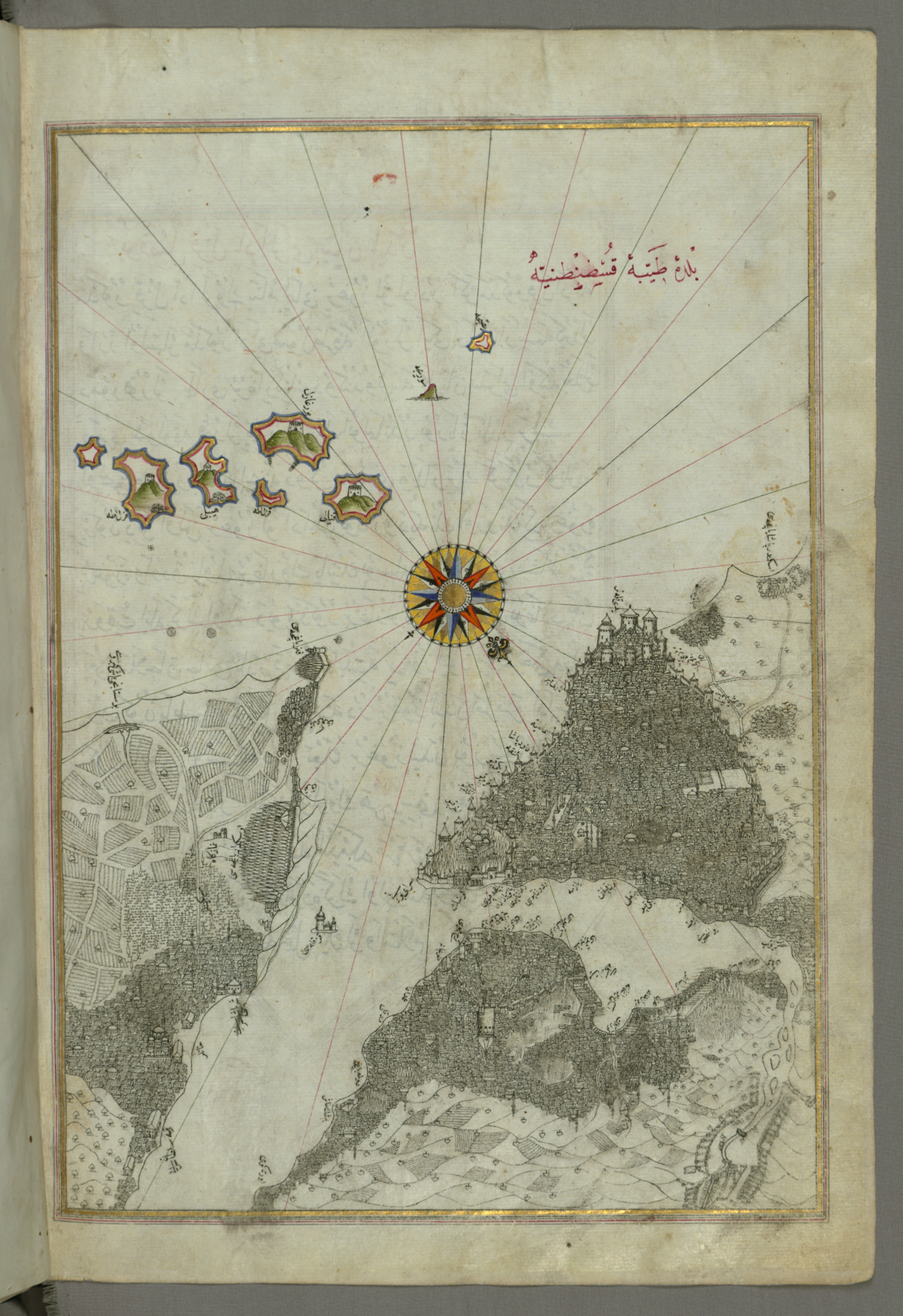
A map of the city from a 17th century copy of the Piri Reis book Kitab-ı Bahriye refers to the city as Kostantiniyye (Walters Art Museum collection).

=== Kostantiniyye ===
Kostantiniyye (Arabic: القسطنطينية, romanized: al-Qusṭanṭīniyya; Persian: قسطنطنیه, romanized: Qosṭanṭanīye; Ottoman Turkish: قسطنطینیه, romanized: Ḳosṭanṭīnīye) is the name by which the city came to be known in the Islamic world. It is an Arabic calque of Constantinople. After the Ottoman conquest of 1453, it was used as the most formal official name in Ottoman Turkish, and remained in use throughout most of the time up to the fall of the Empire in 1922. However, during some periods Ottoman authorities favoured other names (see below).

=== Istanbul ===
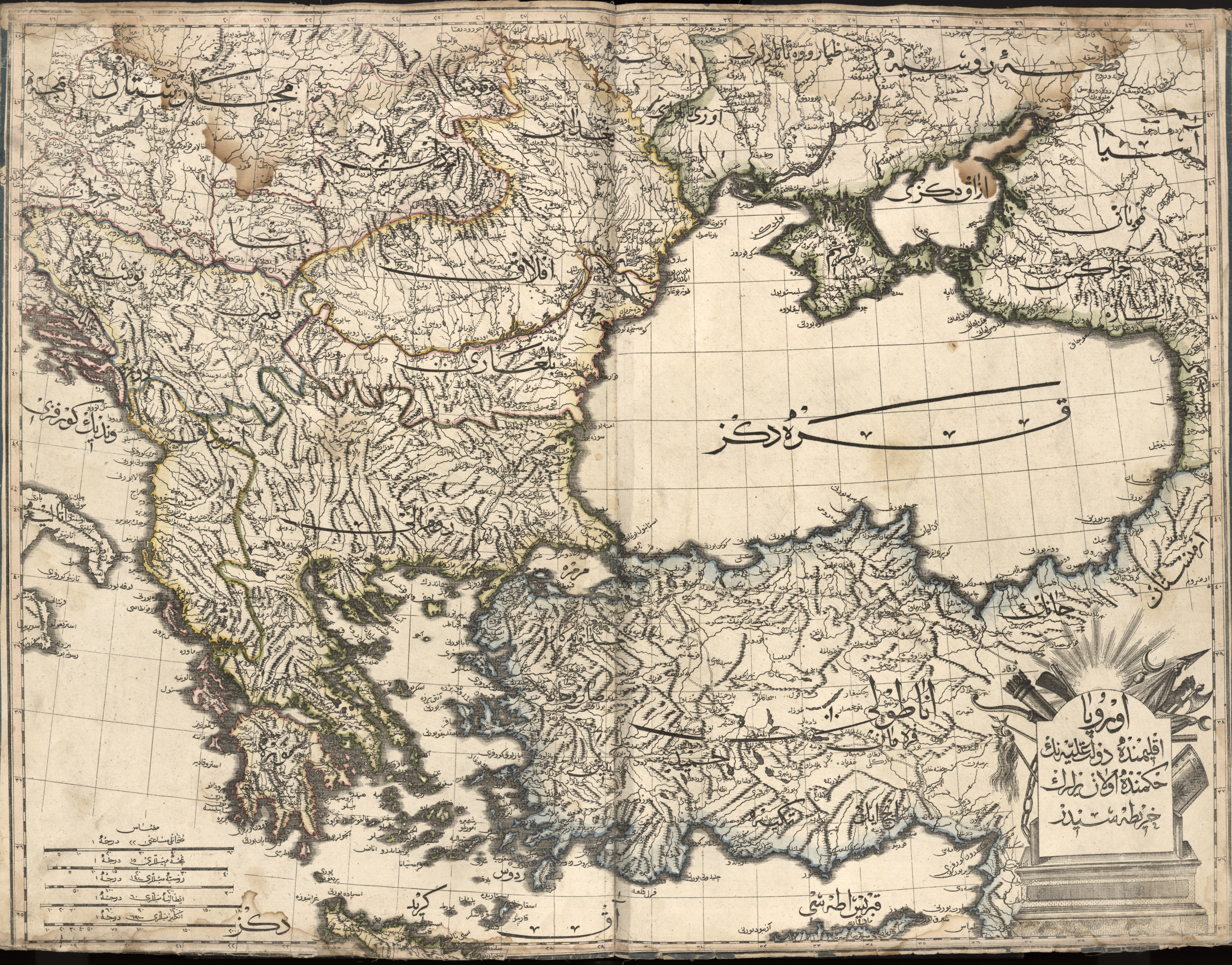
Cedid Atlas, the first published atlas in the Ottoman Empire, dated 1803, refers to the city as İstanbul. Second map refers to the Bosphorus as İstanbul Boğazı (Istanbul Strait).

The modern Turkish name İstanbul (pronounced [isˈtanbuɫ]) (Ottoman Turkish: استانبول) is attested (in a range of variants) since the 10th century, at first in Armenian and Arabic (without the initial İ-) and then in Ottoman sources. Some sources have speculated that it comes from the Medieval Greek phrase "εἰς τὴν πόλιν", meaning "to the city", reinterpreted as a single word, but a 2015 review of the literature found a more likely explanation to be that: "The form of the etymon is the colloquial Middle Greek phrase στην Πόλι(ν), not the puristic literary ancestor of this. The meaning of the etymon is probably ‘in Constantinople’, possibly ‘to Constantinople’ and just possibly ‘into Constantinople’". (Note: An alternative derivation, directly from Constantinople, was entertained as an hypothesis by some researchers in the 19th century but is today regarded as obsolete; see Sakaoğlu (1993/94a: 254) and Stachowski for references.)

The incorporation of parts of articles and other particles into Greek place names was common even before the Ottoman period: Navarino for earlier Avarino, Satines for Athines, etc. Similar examples of modern Turkish place names derived from Greek in this fashion are İzmit, earlier İznikmit, from Greek Nicomedia, İznik from Greek Nicaea ([iz nikea]), Samsun (s'Amison from "se" and "Amisos"), and İstanköy for the Greek island Kos (from is tin Ko). The occurrence of the initial i- in these names, including Istanbul's, is largely secondary epenthesis to break up syllabic consonant clusters, prohibited by the phonotactic structure of Turkish, as seen in Turkish istasyon from French station or ızgara from the Greek schára.

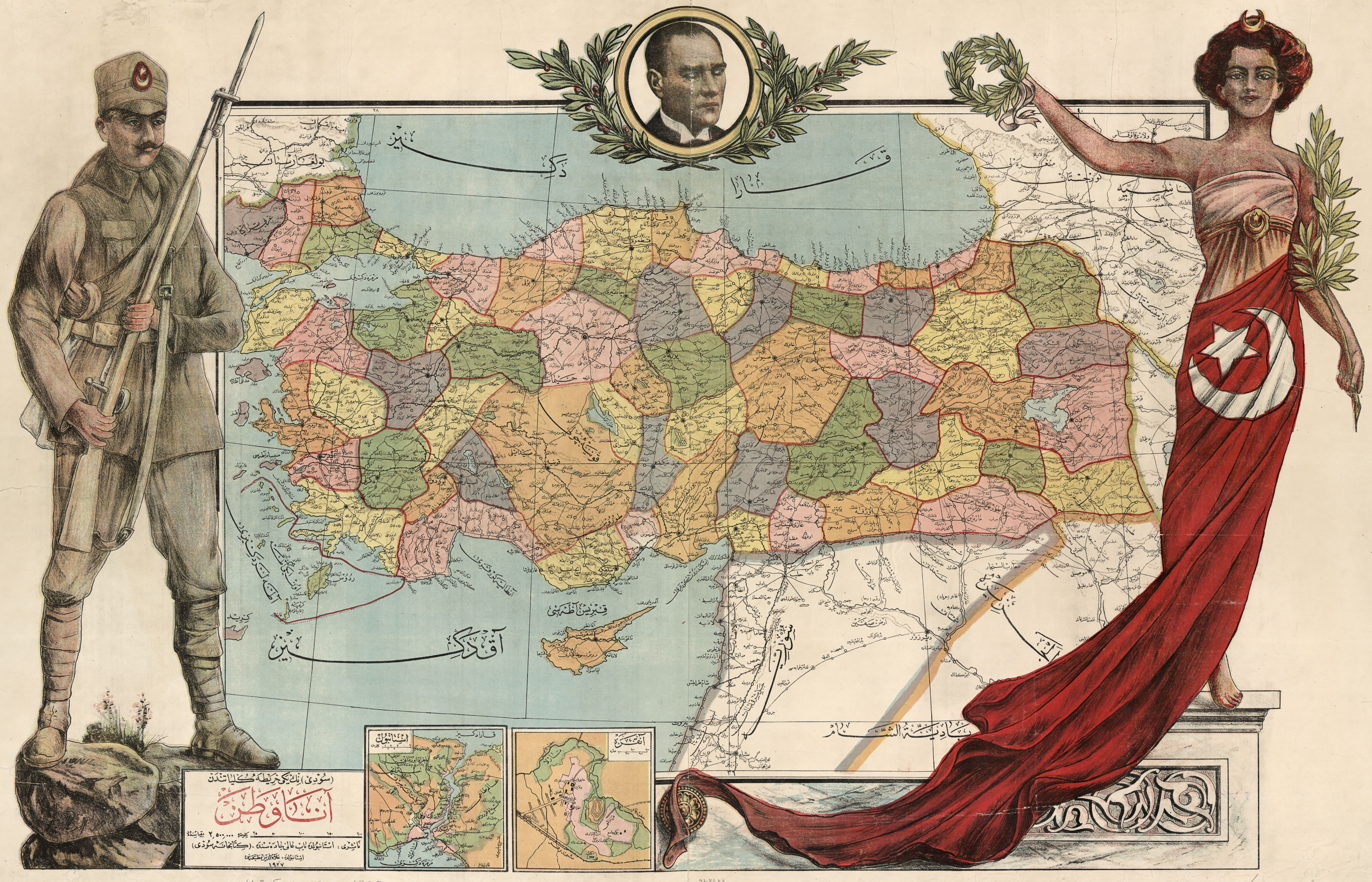
A 1927 map of Turkey which was published before the alphabet reform, where the name İstanbul is used

İstanbul originally was not used for the entire city, instead the name referred to the core of Istanbul—the walled city. İstanbul was the common name for the city in normal speech in Turkish even before the conquest of 1453, but in official use by the Ottoman authorities other names, such as Kostantiniyye, were preferred in certain contexts. Thus, Kostantiniyye was used on coinage up to the late 17th and then again in the 19th century. The Ottoman chancery and courts used Kostantiniyye as part of intricate formulae in expressing the place of origin of formal documents, such as be-Makam-ı Darü's-Saltanat-ı Kostantiniyyetü'l-Mahrusâtü'l-Mahmiyye. In 19th century Turkish book-printing it was also used in the impressum of books, in contrast to the foreign use of Constantinople. At the same time, however, İstanbul too was part of the official language, for instance in the titles of the highest Ottoman military commander (İstanbul ağası) and the highest civil magistrate (İstanbul efendisi) of the city, and the Ottoman Turkish version of the Ottoman constitution of 1876 states that "The capital city of the Ottoman State is İstanbul". İstanbul and several other variant forms of the same name were also widely used in Ottoman literature and poetry.

Names other than استانبول (İstanbul) had become obsolete in the Turkish language after the establishment of the Republic of Turkey. However, at that point Constantinople was still used when writing the city's name in Latin script. In 1928, the Turkish alphabet was changed from the Arabic to the Latin script. Beginning in 1930, Turkey officially requested that other countries use Turkish names for Turkish cities, instead of other transliterations to Latin script that had been used in the Ottoman times.

T. R. Ybarra of The New York Times wrote in 1929 that "'Istambul' (our usual form for the word is 'Stamboul') has always been the Turkish name for the whole of Constantinople". The Observer wrote that "To the Turks themselves it never was Constantinople, but Istanbul." In 1929 Lloyd's agents were informed that telegrams now must be addressed to "Istanbul" or "Stamboul", but The Times stated that mail could still be delivered to "Constantinople". However The New York Times stated that year that mail to "Constantinople" may no longer be delivered. In 1929, Turkish government advocated for the use of Istanbul in English instead of Constantinople. The U.S. State Department began using "Istanbul" in May 1930.

In English, the name is usually written "Istanbul". In modern Turkish, the name is written "İstanbul" (dotted i/İ and dotless ı/I being two distinct letters in the Turkish alphabet).

=== Stamboul ===
Stamboul or Stambul is a variant form of İstanbul. Like Istanbul itself, forms without the initial i- are attested from early on in the Middle Ages, first in Arabic sources of the 10th century and Armenian ones of the 12th. Some early sources also attest to an even shorter form Bulin, based on the Greek word Poli(n) alone without the preceding article. (This latter form lives on in modern Armenian.) The word-initial i- arose in the Turkish name as an epenthetic vowel to break up the St- consonant cluster, prohibited in Turkish phonotactics.

Stamboul was used in Western languages to refer to the central city, as Istanbul did in Turkish, until the time it was replaced by the official new usage of the Turkish form in the 1930s for the entire city. In the 19th and early 20th centuries, Western European and American sources often used Constantinople to refer to the metropolis as a whole, but Stamboul to refer to the central parts located on the historic peninsula, i.e. Byzantine-era Constantinople inside the walls.

=== Islambol ===
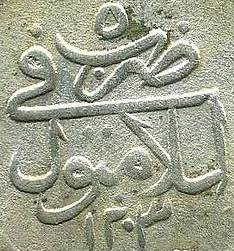
"Islambol" on an Ottoman coin belonging to Selim III, which was struck in his fifth regnal year (c. 1793/94).

The name Islambol (اسلامبول lit. 'full of Islam') appeared after the Ottoman conquest of 1453 to express the city's new role as the capital of the Islamic Ottoman Empire. It was first attested shortly after the conquest, and its invention was ascribed by some contemporary writers to sultan Mehmed II himself. Some Ottoman sources of the 17th century, most notably Evliya Çelebi, describe it as the common Turkish name of the time. Between the late 17th and late 18th centuries, it was also in official use. The first use of the word "Islambol" on coinage was in 1730 during the reign of sultan Mahmud I. The term Kostantiniyye still appeared, however, into the 20th century.

=== Other Ottoman names ===
Ottomans and foreign contemporaries, especially in diplomatic correspondence, referred to the Ottoman imperial government with particular honorifics. Among them are the following:

- Bāb-i ʿĀlī (باب عالی, "The Sublime Porte"); a metonym referring to the gate of Topkapı Palace
- Der-i Devlet (در دولت "Abode of the State")
- Der-i Saʿādet (در سعادت "Abode of Felicity" or "Abode of Eudaimonia")
- Āsitāne (آستانه "Threshold"), referring to the imperial court, a Persian-origin word spelled in English as Asitane or Asitana
- Pāy-taḫt or sometimes Pāyitaḫt (پای تخت, "The Seat/Base of the Throne")

The "Gate of Felicity", the "Sublime Gate", and the "Sublime Porte" were literally places within the Ottoman sultans' Topkapı Palace, and were used metonymically to refer to the authorities located there, and hence for the central Ottoman imperial administration. Modern historians also refer to government by these terms, similar to the popular usage of Whitehall in Britain. The Sublime Gate is not inside Topkapı palace; the administration building whose gate is named Bâb-ı Âlî is between Agia Sofia and Beyazit mosque, a huge building.

== Historical names in other languages ==
"[...] and the Greeks do not call Constantinople as we call it but Escomboli [...]" in a 16th-century manuscript of the Castilian 15th-century Embajada a Tamorlan by Ruy González de Clavijo.

Many peoples neighboring the Byzantine Empire used names expressing concepts like "The Great City", "City of the Emperors", "Capital of the Romans" or similar. During the 10th to 12th century Constantinople was one of the largest two cities in the world, the other being Baghdad.

=== Old Norse ===
The medieval Vikings, who had contacts with the Byzantine Empire through their expansion through eastern Europe (Varangians), used the Old Norse name Mikligarðr (from mikill 'big' and garðr 'wall' or 'stronghold') as seen in the Icelandic sagas.

=== Slavic and Romanian ===
East and South Slavic languages referred to the city as Tsarigrad or Carigrad, 'City of the Tsar (Emperor)', from the Slavonic words tsar ('Caesar' or 'Emperor') and grad ('city'). Cyrillic: Царьград, Цариград. This was presumably a calque on a Greek phrase such as Βασιλέως Πόλις (Basileos Polis), 'the city of the emperor [emperor]'. The term is still occasionally used in Bulgarian, whereas it has become archaic in Russian, and Macedonian. In Bosnian, Croatian, Montenegrin, Serbian and Slovene, Carigrad is a living alternative name for the modern city, as well as being used when referring to the historic capital of the medieval Roman Empire or the Ottoman Empire. In Czech (a West Slavic language) this Slavic name is used in the form Cařihrad (used in the 19th century, now only occasionally). It was also borrowed from the Slavic languages into Romanian in the form Țarigrad, though Constantinopol remained the far more widely preferred term.

=== Persian, Urdu, and Arabic ===
Besides Kustantiniyyah, Persian, Arabic and other languages of the Iranian Plateau and Indian subcontinent used names based on the title Cesar ('Emperor'), as in Persian and Urdu Kayser-i Zemin, or on the ethnic name Rum ('Romans'), as in Arabic Rūmiyyat al-kubra ('Great City of the Romans') or Persian Takht-e Rum ('Throne of the Romans').

=== Judaeo-Spanish ===
The city is referred to as Kostandina or Kostantina (an alteration of Kostantiniyye) and more often as its short form Kushta (קושטה) or Kostán in most Judaeo-Spanish publications during the Ottoman period. Kosta was the name for the entire province of Istanbul, while the word Estambol was used for the area of the old city and Pera. Today the word Kosta is restricted only for historical purposes and is no more in common use.

The word Estambol has widened in meaning to include exclusively the entire European side of Istanbul. The Asian side is usually not considered as Estambol; however, the expression la civdad de Estambol would encompass the boundaries of the present-day city. There are few expression denoting the Asian side. Anatol, from Anatolia and Asya, meaning Asia are common words to denote the Asian side of Istanbul. Moreover, el otro lado (literally the other side) is a quite simplistic and descriptory expression for the Asian side of Istanbul, especially for those living in the European side. Those living in the Asian side however do not use this expression to denote the European side, but simply call it Estambol. The inhabitants are called Estambulí or Estambullí.

== Modern languages ==
Most modern Western languages have adopted the name Istanbul for the modern city during the 20th century, following the current usage in the Turkish Republic. However, many languages also preserve other, traditional names. Greeks continue to call the city Constantinople (Κωνσταντινούπολη Konstantinupoli in Modern Greek) or simply "The City" (η Πόλη i Poli). Languages that use forms based on Stamboul include Russian, Polish (though the alternative form of Istambuł is also universally accepted and employed in many translations), Latvian, Lithuanian, Georgian and Albanian. The Albanian form is Stamboll; the Spanish form is Estambul; the Portuguese form is Istambul, with an m instead of an n; the Hungarian form is Isztambul, with the digraph sz pronounced /s/ in the Hungarian language. Armenian uses Polis/Bolis (Eastern and Western Armenian pronunciation, respectively), shortened from Kostandnupolis/Gostantnubolis (ultimately borrowed from Greek), although Stambul (Armenian: Ստամբուլ) from Istanbul is also used in everyday speech and officially used in Armenia. Icelandic preserves the old Norse name Mikligarður, though the form Istanbúl is generally used. In Slovene Carigrad is still largely used and often preferred over the official name.

== See also ==
- "Istanbul (Not Constantinople)", a 1953 novelty song

== Bibliography ==
İnalcık, Halil (1997). "Istanbul". In van Donzel, E.; Lewis, B.; Phellat, Ch. (eds.). Encyclopaedia of Islam. Vol. 4 (2nd ed.). Leiden: Brill. pp. 224–248. ISBN 9789004057456.
