= Apollo 18 (album) =

Studio album by They Might Be Giants
- Released: March 24, 1992
- Recorded: September 1991 – January 1992
- Studios: Magic Shop, New York City
- Genres: Alternative rock; indie rock; experimental rock; art rock
- Length: 42:37
- Label: Elektra
- Producer: They Might Be Giants

They Might Be Giants chronology
Miscellaneous T (1991)	Apollo 18 (1992)	Why Does the Sun Shine? (1993)

Singles from Apollo 18
- 1. "The Statue Got Me High" Released: February 20, 1992; 2. "I Palindrome I" Released: May 7, 1992; 3. "The Guitar (The Lion Sleeps Tonight)" Released: July 30, 1992

Apollo 18 is the fourth studio album by American alternative rock duo They Might Be Giants, released in 1992. It was released through Elektra Records and was named after the canceled Apollo 18 mission. The album was also associated with International Space Year, for which They Might Be Giants were declared the official "musical ambassadors" by NASA.

The album marked the first conscious effort by John Linnell and John Flansburgh to branch out of their early sound, opting for more traditional rock rhythms and fuller arrangements. The duo adopted a backing band with live drums during the supporting tour, with Apollo 18 being their last album recorded as only a duo.

Apollo 18 also includes the "Fingertips" suite, a series of twenty-one short songs, most under thirty seconds long. The album generated three singles, "The Statue Got Me High", "The Guitar (The Lion Sleeps Tonight)" and "I Palindrome I", although only "The Statue Got Me High" and "The Guitar" charted.

The album received mostly positive reviews from music critics, with many commending the band for making music with a darker tone. However, the album was criticized for lacking a standout lead single. Commercially, the album was not as successful as Flood (1990), peaking at number 99 on the Billboard 200 and spending only six weeks on that chart. In addition, some fans were upset that Flansburgh and Linnell opted to use a backing band for the album's tour.

== Recording and production ==
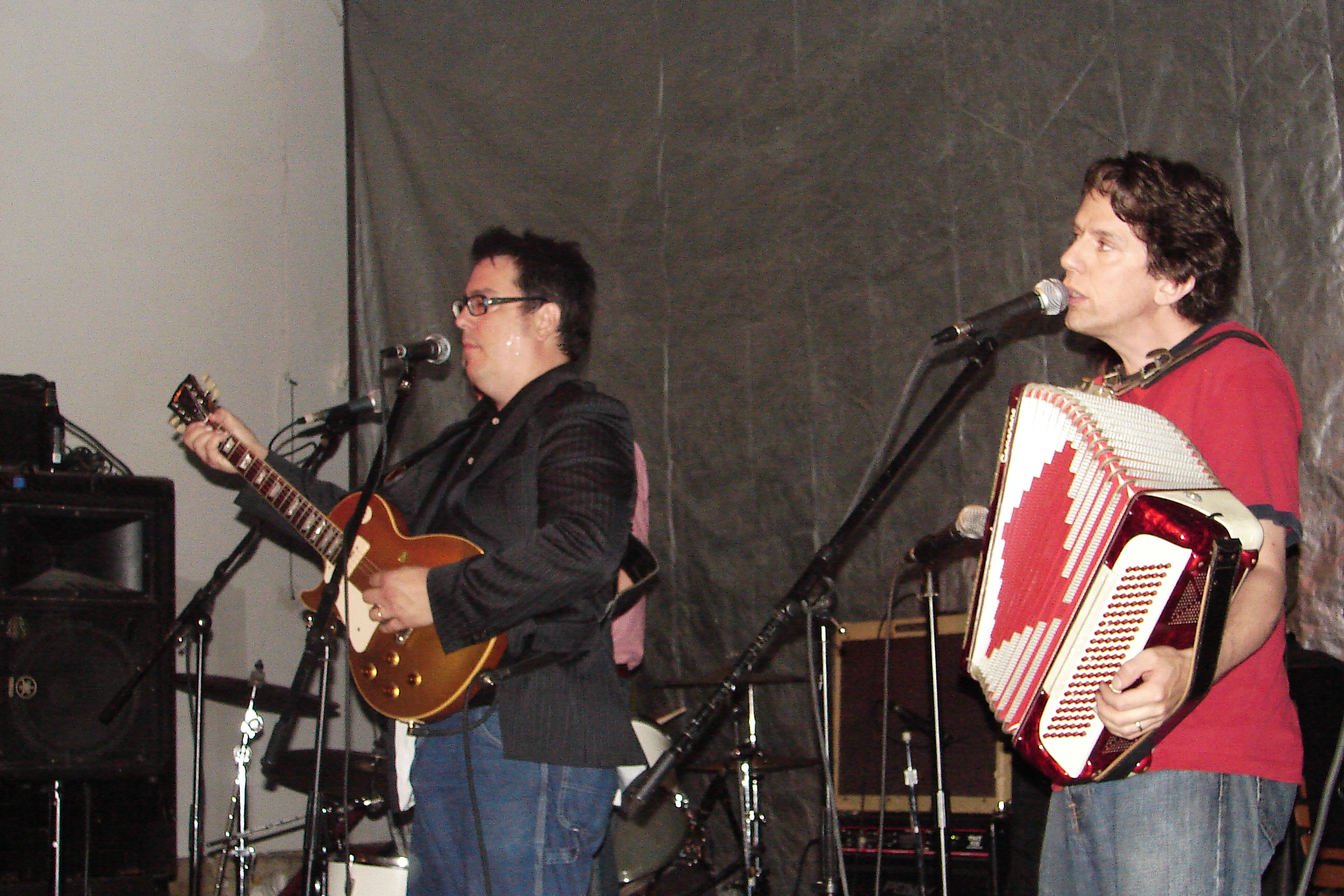
John Flansburgh (left) and John Linnell (right), the two members of the band, produced Apollo 18 by themselves.

"Having the freedom to do the production on the entire record has been very positive. The writing and recording were our only focus for nine months. We purposely avoided session-man-mania, and let our own humble playing shine through."

— John Flansburgh on self-producing the album

After the major success of Flood (1990), Elektra sought out Elvis Costello to produce Apollo 18; however, John Linnell and John Flansburgh elected to produce the album themselves as they had originally planned. Prior to recording, the band upgraded many of their instruments; Flansburgh purchased a Marshall amp and Linnell bought several new saxophones. The album was recorded at The Magic Shop in New York City in approximately ten weeks. Although the band recorded Apollo 18 primarily as a duo, its production is musically sparser than that of previous releases. The album's associated tour, the Don't Tread on the Cut-Up Snake World Tour 1992, was the band's first to use a live backing band, rather than a tape deck playing backing tracks. Linnell later noted that this led to much more complicated and deliberate rehearsals.

== Style and composition ==
The music found on Apollo 18 is slightly darker in tone and mood than the songs found on Flood. When it came to writing songs for the album, Linnell and Flansburgh used "old standbys", such as producing harmonies through improvisation and generating melodies by sampling sounds in varying cycles. However, according to the album's press release, Flansburgh and Linnell both sought to expand their horizons and incorporate new sounds and "extreme song arrangements".

The album's opening track, "Dig My Grave", has been described by Parry Gettelman of the Orlando Sentinel as "an angry, fuzzed-out rocker". The vocals for the track were recorded through a guitar fuzz box in order to distort them. "I Palindrome I" originated as a demo written by John Flansburgh for the band's "Dial-A-Song" service. John Linnell later adapted the lyric after attending a reading by the American poet Hal Sirowitz.

"She's Actual Size" was written by Flansburgh after he contemplated the imagery of someone viewing a departing person in a mirror; he felt that the symbolism was a "really succinct way of talking about leaving somebody behind". The band later expressed disappointment with the "definitive" version featured on this album, largely because the song continued to develop as the band played it live. Flansburgh called the album version "timid" and noted that "later performance versions of [the song] have so much more spirit than the recorded version"; a version would later appear on the band's live album Severe Tire Damage. Although Linnell and Flansburgh usually write songs individually, "My Evil Twin" was an example of the two collaborating. Linnell wrote the musical structure of the song, rendering it as a MIDI file, and Flansburgh then wrote the melody and the lyrics. "Mammal" discusses various members of the titular vertebrate class, and, according to Linnell, poetically explores the fact that "all mammals have hair at some stage in their development". In an interview with Wired magazine, Linnell revealed that most of the scientific information in the song was gathered from an encyclopedia.

"The Statue Got Me High"
Chorus sample from "The Statue Got Me High"

The first single released from the album was "The Statue Got Me High". The titular lyrics originally started out with the line "The apple of my eye..." but Linnell soon conceived the line that would become the title, and he was amused at the juxtaposition of a statue—something "utterly immobile and [...] in the past"—completely "blowing somebody's mind". Linnell has stated the song's lyrics detail, in part, the "life of Don Giovanni" and that the song's allusions to the fictional character of Don Juan were initially coincidental. "Spider" is an eclectic song that was made when Flansburgh and Linnell were experimenting with a sampler. Linnell provided almost all of the voices, save for the line "must stop!", which was spoken by Flansburgh. Flansburgh himself was responsible for the bongos, horns and various sound effects.

The second single, "The Guitar (The Lion Sleeps Tonight)", grew out of a jam based on the Tokens song "The Lion Sleeps Tonight". The song was also originally intended to simply be titled "The Guitar". Because of the legal ramifications of including the "Lion Sleeps Tonight" motif, Elektra required the band to add the name of the original song to the title. The song features Laura Cantrell on the chorus. "Dinner Bell" references Ivan Pavlov, and his experimentation in classical conditioning by using a dinner bell to cause his dog to salivate. According to Rolling Stone, "Narrow Your Eyes" is a "touching breakup song that pays vocal tribute to The Beatles and The Four Seasons". Spin magazine called the song "the most direct lyrically and simplest musically." The first line of "See the Constellation"—described by Rolling Stone as "a psychedelic/New Wave potion"—references railroad tracks and was inspired by a promotional photo of an Elektra recording artist who was resting on tracks.

"Fingertips" is a series of 21 short tracks ranging in duration from four to 61 seconds, totaling 4:35. Referring to these tracks, the album's liner notes include the message "the indexing of this disc is designed to complement the Shuffle Mode of modern CD players". According to John Flansburgh, listening to the album on shuffle made a collage of songs, with the short fingertips interspersed among tracks of regular length. Arnold Aronson argued that this element made the album "a stunning declaration of post-modernism" because of its heavy use of "rupture, dissociation, and pastiche". The songs were written to resemble short fragments of pop songs. The format was inspired by advertisements for collections of music, which only included samples of choruses. The "Fingertips" suite features vocal cameos from Peter Stampfel, who founded The Holy Modal Rounders, and Brian Dewan, who crafted the shrine that appeared on They Might Be Giants' 1988 album Lincoln. The album concludes with "Space Suit", a jazz-influenced song with synthesizer elements. The song had been written to make use of chords that Flansburgh had learned under the tutelage of Jack DeSalvo. The song originally was titled "I'll Remember 3rd Street", a nod to its "jazzy origins", but once the keyboard elements were added, the band decided to give it a name that was more "spacey".

== Title and packaging ==
"Apollo 17 was the last lunar mission, so Apollo 18 the record is sort of a poor substitute for an actual moon launch. Cheaper for everybody. It seemed to tie together partly the idea of space but also being spaced out. Which seems silly to have as a theme for a record, but it's such a common state for me and John [Flansburgh]."

— John Linnell on selecting the album's title

The title of the album references NASA's aborted Apollo 18 mission, originally planned to land in the moon's Schroter's Valley in February 1972. The album's cover depicts a giant squid locked in combat with a sperm whale in space, using graphics that the Johns came across while searching the NASA Archive Center for images to use in media art surrounding the album. The Dial-A-Song phone number is misprinted as 718-963-6962 on the back of the album, a number that would instead dial a warehouse. The album liner notes and artwork for the album's singles include a number of photographs from NASA, and the packaging was designed by John Flansburgh, under the pseudonym "Rolf Conant", with Barbara Lipp.

== Promotion ==
Between 1992 and 1993, Bo Orloff, the band's assistant manager, sent out various informational updates via email to the band's mailing list. These included a full track listing prior to the album's release, as well as a press release and biography of the band. The bulletins also included information on the album's associated tour.

The band appeared as a musical guest on numerous talk shows to promote Apollo 18. "The Guitar (The Lion Sleeps Tonight)" and "The Statue Got Me High" were performed on The Tonight Show with Jay Leno and "I Palindrome I" on Late Night with David Letterman. Their appearance on The Tonight Show with Jay Leno on May 19, 1992, was the television debut of They Might Be Giants' new backing band.

=== International Space Year ===
ISY logo

The band became associated with the International Space Year (ISY), designated as 1992 by the United Nations to promote peaceful and collaborative space exploration, when Linnell and Flansburgh were searching the NASA Archive Center for appropriate photographs and visual materials for the album artwork. Staff members at the NASA facility took notice of the duo and inquired about their research. Linnell responded that they "were in this band, we're making this record, and we're going to start touring next year...They were particularly interested in that, because they said that 1992 was ISY. It was the first time we ever heard of that, but they said because we were a band going to be touring around the world in 1992 they wondered if we wanted to be spokesband for the ISY. So we said why not?"

The band was soon declared the official "musical ambassadors" for the year, although, according to Linnell, it was more of an informal arrangement. The band had originally planned to create short videos called "Space Minutes", which would have aired on an unspecified cable television station that was affiliated with ISY, but the plans never came to fruition. In support of the designation, the ISY logo was included on the back cover of the album. The band was scheduled for concerts to endorse ISY, and mentioned in promotional material from NASA, which headed the celebration in the United States. Commenting on the success of the designation of International Space Year, however, Linnell pointed out that he "[didn't] think most people have heard that this is International Space Year".

=== Don't Tread on the Cut-Up Snake World Tour ===
In support of Apollo 18, They Might Be Giants embarked on a tour across the United States, Europe and Asia. The tour was named the "Don't Tread on the Cut-Up Snake World Tour 1992", a reference to the Gadsden flag and the "Join, or Die" cartoon, with the "world tour" affix appended by Elektra Records. The band's largest tour up to that point, spanning the length of 1992, the Don't Tread on the Cut-Up Snake tour was also associated with ISY. Although they were initially hesitant about using live backing musicians, it was also the first tour for which Linnell and Flansburgh were joined by a live band, consisting of a rhythm section and saxophonist. They were encouraged to adopt the larger touring outfit by their Elektra A&R representative, Susan Drew. The band also expanded to include a regular rhythm guitarist, bass player and saxophone player for their subsequent studio recordings.

The band's "O Tannenbaum" single was recorded during a sound check on the tour. The track would later reappear on the They Might Be Giants In... Holidayland EP, released in 2001.

=== Promotional video ===
A short video promoting Apollo 18 was produced by Elektra Records, in the vein of the previous Flood promo. In the video, graphic and video illustrations of certain songs are presented, in addition to samples of some of the songs. The video is arranged to resemble a traditional slide show presentation.

== Critical reception ==
Professional ratings
Review scores
Source	Rating
AllMusic	4/5 stars
Chicago Tribune	3/4 stars
Entertainment Weekly	B+
Q	3/5 stars
Rolling Stone	4/5 stars
The Village Voice	A−

Apollo 18 garnered positive reviews from critics. Writing for AllMusic, Stephen Thomas Erlewine gave the album 4 out of 5 stars and stated that it was more "consistent" than predecessors, making note of its darker tone. However, Erlewine also felt that the album was "lacking a standout single". Robert Christgau, who assigned the album an A−, praised the first five tracks especially, asserting that the remaining 33 were more experimental in nature. Christgau acclaimed the album's melodic attributes while stating that the lyrics were pleasant but "meaningless". Ira Robbins, reviewing for Rolling Stone, gave Apollo 18 4 out of 5 stars. Similar to Christgau, Robbins called the lyrics "whimsy" and said that they were not too complex to weigh down melodies. Robbins also praised the album's eclecticism, observing that "'Turn Around' mimics Forties swing; the funky bass groove of 'The Guitar' interpolates a rewrite of 'The Lion Sleeps Tonight', fetchingly sung by Laura Cantrell. Another wry science lesson, 'See the Constellation', mixes a psychedelic/New Wave potion for a bouncy space trip." Robbins was critical of the disorganized "Fingertips" selections. A review by Craig Tomashoff, published in People, lauded the variety found in "Fingertips". Tomashoff also made note of the wide vocabulary employed in the lyrics (citing, specifically, "Turn Around" and "I Palindrome I"), concluding that the album was "totally cool".

== Commercial performance ==
On April 11, 1992, Apollo 18 peaked at number 99 on the Billboard 200. It spent six weeks on that chart. Apollo 18 debuted on the Australian ARIA albums chart at number 60 on April 26, 1992, before peaking at number 59 the following week; it spent 6 weeks in the top 100.

Although Apollo 18 received a positive response from consumers and critics, some fans were upset that the duo of Linnell and Flansburgh had been augmented to include a full band for the album's tour. In rebuttal, some fans stopped attending live concerts, even taking the aggressive approach of trying to discourage others from entering venues for shows. Despite these reactions, the live band was generally well received. In The New York Times review of a contemporaneous live show, Jon Pareles observed that the band was "just as tricky as ever", and still delighted its audience. They Might Be Giants continues to record and tour with a full backing band.

== Track listing ==
All tracks written by John Flansburgh and John Linnell, except where noted.

No.	Title	Writer(s)	Length
1.	"Dig My Grave"		1:08
2.	"I Palindrome I"		2:25
3.	"She's Actual Size"		2:05
4.	"My Evil Twin"		2:37
5.	"Mammal"		2:14
6.	"The Statue Got Me High"		3:06
7.	"Spider"		0:50
8.	"The Guitar (The Lion Sleeps Tonight)"	Flansburgh; Linnell; Hugo Peretti; Luigi Creatore; George David Weiss	3:49
9.	"Dinner Bell"		2:11
10.	"Narrow Your Eyes"		2:46
11.	"Hall of Heads"		2:53
12.	"Which Describes How You're Feeling"		1:13
13.	"See the Constellation"		3:27
14.	"If I Wasn't Shy"		1:43
15.	"Turn Around"		2:53
16.	"Hypnotist of Ladies"		1:42
17.	"Fingertips 1: Everything's Catching on Fire"		0:12
18.	"Fingertips 2: Fingertips"		0:06
19.	"Fingertips 3: I Hear the Wind Blow"		0:10
20.	"Fingertips 4: Hey Now Everybody"		0:05
21.	"Fingertips 5: Who's That Standing out My Window?"		0:06
22.	"Fingertips 6: I Found a New Friend"		0:07
23.	"Fingertips 7: Come on and Wreck My Car"		0:12
24.	"Fingertips 8: Aren't You the Guy Who Hit Me in the Eye?"		0:07
25.	"Fingertips 9: Please Pass the Milk"		0:08
26.	"Fingertips 10: Leave Me Alone"		0:05
27.	"Fingertips 11: Who's Knocking on the Wall?"		0:04
28.	"Fingertips 12: All Alone"		0:05
29.	"Fingertips 13: What's That Blue Thing Doing Here?"		0:08
30.	"Fingertips 14: Something Grabbed Ahold of My Hand"		0:12
31.	"Fingertips 15: I Don't Understand You"		0:27
32.	"Fingertips 16: I Heard a Sound"		0:04
33.	"Fingertips 17: Mysterious Whisper"		0:28
34.	"Fingertips 18: The Day That Love Came to Play"		0:08
35.	"Fingertips 19: I'm Having a Heart Attack"		0:22
36.	"Fingertips 20: Fingertips"		0:10
37.	"Fingertips 21: I Walk Along Darkened Corridors"		1:01
38.	"Space Suit"		1:36
Total length:			42:37

Tracks 17 to 37 are listed as a single entry (track 17) simply titled "Fingertips"; however, "Space Suit" is given as track 38 on the CD track listing.

== Singles ==
=== The Statue Got Me High ===
"The Statue Got Me High"

Single by They Might Be Giants

from the album Apollo 18
- Released: February 20, 1992
- Recorded: September–October 1991
- Length: 3:06
- Label: Elektra

They Might Be Giants singles chronology
"Twisting" (1990)	"The Statue Got Me High" (1992)	"I Palindrome I" (1992)

Music video
- The Statue Got Me High on YouTube

"The Statue Got Me High" was the first single released to support Apollo 18. The song was later re-released on several compilation albums, including Dial-A-Song: 20 Years of They Might Be Giants (2002), A User's Guide to They Might Be Giants (2005), and 50,000,000 They Might Be Giants Songs Can't Be Wrong (2015).

The B-side of the EP has "I'm Def" and a demo of "Which Describes How You're Feeling". Both of those songs appeared on 1985 demo tape.

Upon its release in 1992, "The Statue Got Me High" peaked at number 24 on the Billboard Modern Rock Tracks chart on March 21, 1992, and spent eight weeks on the chart. A music video for the single, directed by Adam Bernstein, was also released, which premiered on MTV's 120 Minutes in February 1992.

==== Track listing ====
No.	Title	Length
1.	"The Statue Got Me High"	3:06
2.	"Which Describes How You're Feeling" (demo)	1:24
3.	"I'm Def"	1:08

=== I Palindrome I ===
"I Palindrome I"

Single by They Might Be Giants

from the album Apollo 18
- Released: May 7, 1992
- Recorded: September 1991
- Length: 2:22
- Label: Elektra

They Might Be Giants singles chronology
"The Statue Got Me High" (1992)	"I Palindrome I" (1992)	"The Guitar (The Lion Sleeps Tonight)" (1992)

"I Palindrome I" is the second single from the album. The song was later re-released on several compilation albums, including Dial-A-Song: 20 Years of They Might Be Giants (2002), A User's Guide to They Might Be Giants (2005), and 50,000,000 They Might Be Giants Songs Can't Be Wrong (2015).

"I Palindrome I" received generally positive attention from critics. Writing for AllMusic, Stewart Mason concluded that the song was musically appealing enough to overcome its shallow lyrics, which he felt employed wordplay for its own sake rather than "in the service of a particular idea or emotion". In a review of Apollo 18, Karen Schlosberg said that the lyrics of "I Palindrome I" sound like "Edgar Allan Poe and David Lynch meeting the Monkees", creating an "unlikely sing-along hook". In a 2016 Gothamist retrospective revisiting They Might Be Giants' studio albums, Ken Bays noted "I Palindrome I" as a highlight for Linnell's strong vocal performance.

==== Track listing ====
No.	Title	Length
1.	"I Palindrome I"	2:22
2.	"Cabbagetown"	2:24
3.	"Siftin'"	1:54
4.	"Larger Than Life"	4:17

=== The Guitar (The Lion Sleeps Tonight) ===
"The Guitar (The Lion Sleeps Tonight)"

Single by They Might Be Giants

from the album Apollo 18
- Released: July 30, 1992
- Recorded: 1992
- Length: 3:49
- Label: Elektra

They Might Be Giants singles chronology
"I Palindrome I" (1992)	"The Guitar (The Lion Sleeps Tonight)" (1992)	"O Tannenbaum" (1993)

Music video
- The Guitar (The Lion Sleeps Tonight) on YouTube

"The Guitar (The Lion Sleeps Tonight)" is the third single from the album. The music video for the song was the first They Might Be Giants video to be directed by band member John Flansburgh.

The song was later re-released on several compilation albums, including Dial-A-Song: 20 Years of They Might Be Giants (2002), A User's Guide to They Might Be Giants (2005), and 50,000,000 They Might Be Giants Songs Can't Be Wrong (2015). Additionally, the band also performed the song as part of their 2001 documentary, Gigantic (A Tale of Two Johns), and in 2013, it was used in a 2013 advertisement for the Buick Encore.

==== Track listing ====
No.	Title	Length
1.	"The Guitar" (Williamsburgh Mix)"	4:13
2.	"The Guitar (Outer Planet Mix)"	6:39
3.	"Welcome to the Jungle"	2:28
4.	"I Blame You"	1:52
5.	"Moving to the Sun"	2:17
6.	"The Guitar (Even Further Outer Planet Mix)"	6:38

== Personnel ==
=== They Might Be Giants ===
- John Flansburgh – vocals, guitars, bass guitar, synth bass, programming, trumpet, percussion, sound effects
- John Linnell – vocals, accordion, keyboards, saxophones, clarinet, programming, synth bass

=== Additional musicians ===
- Mark Feldman – violin on tracks 1 and 11
- Garo Yellin – cello on track 1
- Jim Thomas – drums on track 3
- Laura Cantrell – vocals on track 8
- Julie Cohen – vocals on track 11
- Peter Stampfel – banjo, vocals on tracks 18 and 36
- Nicholas Hill – vocals on track 19
- Elma Mayer – vocals on track 20 and 25
- Brian Dewan – vocals on track 22 and 27
- Amy Allison – vocals on track 30

=== Production staff ===
- They Might Be Giants – producer
- Edward Douglas IV – engineer
- Bruce Calder – engineer
- Brian Pollack – engineer
- UE Nastasi – engineer on Fingertips
- Patrick Dillett – mixing on "Fingertips"
- Paul Angelli – recording; mixing on "Fingertips"
- John Flansburgh – design
- Marjorie Galen, Kurt Hoffman, Barbara Lipp, Bo Orloff, Beth Passero, and Vivian Walsh – art assistance
- Ralph Morse – photography
- Don Uhrbrock – photography
- J. Otto Seibold – photography
- Fred Tomaselli – sculpture

== Chart performance ==
=== Album ===
Chart (1992)	Peak position
Australian Albums (ARIA)	59
US Billboard 200	99

=== Singles ===
Year	Single	Chart	Peak position
1992	"The Statue Got Me High"	Billboard Modern Rock Tracks	24
1992	"The Guitar"	Australia (ARIA)	180

== Release history ==
Apollo 18 was released on CD and cassette in the United States, Australia, and Canada and on CD, LP and cassette formats in European markets by Elektra Records. In 2013, a two-part CD compilation collected Apollo 18 and some contemporary B-sides along with the band's other Elektra studio albums and surrounding material. The album was also released on LP in the United States and Canada by Asbestos Records in 2014 as part of a series of LP reissues spanning They Might Be Giants' period on the Elektra label. In 2022, the album was re-released on They Might Be Giants' own label, Idlewild Recordings.

Region	Date	Label	Format	Catalog
Europe	March 20, 1992	WEA / Elektra Records	LP	7559-61257-1
Europe	March 20, 1992	WEA / Elektra Records	CD	7559-61257-2
Europe	March 20, 1992	WEA / Elektra Records	Cassette	7559-61257-3
United States	March 24, 1992	Elektra Records	CD	61257-2
United States	March 24, 1992	Elektra Records	Cassette	61257-4
Canada	March 24, 1992	Elektra Records	CD	CD 61257
Canada	March 24, 1992	Elektra Records	Cassette	96 12574
Japan	April 10, 1992	WEA / Elektra Records	CD	WMC5-482
Israel	1992	WEA / Elektra Records	Cassette	7559-61257-4
Australia	1992	WEA / Elektra Records	CD	7559-61257-2
Australia	1992	WEA / Elektra Records	Cassette	7559-61257-4
United States and Canada	April 2014	Asbestos Records	LP	ASB089
United States and Canada	2022	Idlewild Recordings	LP	IDLE180 / IDLE182
