= Flood (They Might Be Giants album) =

- Cover artwork for the CD release

Studio album by They Might Be Giants
- Released: January 15, 1990
- Recorded: 1989
- Studios: Skyline Studio, Manhattan, New York City
- Genres: Alternative rock; art rock
- Length: 43:24
- Label: Elektra
- Producers: They Might Be Giants; Alan Winstanley; Clive Langer

They Might Be Giants chronology
Lincoln (1988)	Flood (1990)	Miscellaneous T (1991)

Singles from Flood
- 1. "Birdhouse in Your Soul" Released: December 19, 1989; 2. "Istanbul (Not Constantinople)" Released: May 14, 1990

Flood is the third studio album by American alternative rock duo They Might Be Giants, released on January 15, 1990. Flood was the duo's first album on the major label Elektra Records. It generated three singles: "Birdhouse in Your Soul", "Istanbul (Not Constantinople)", and the domestic promotional track "Twisting".

The album is generally considered to be the band's definitive release, as it is their best-selling and most recognizable album, and is regarded as one of the best albums of the 1990s. Despite minimal stylistic and instrumental differences from previous releases, Flood is distinguished by contributions from seasoned producers Clive Langer and Alan Winstanley. Band members John Linnell and John Flansburgh also took advantage of new equipment and recording techniques, including unconventional, home-recorded samples, which were programmed through Casio FZ-1 synthesizers. The album was recorded in New York City at Skyline Studios, which was better equipped than studios the band had worked in previously.

Promotion for Flood included television appearances, promotional videos, and an international tour. The album's mainstream promotion and success contributed to its status as the band's most well-known album. Many fans, including young viewers of Tiny Toon Adventures, were first exposed to They Might Be Giants' music through Flood.

The album was initially issued on CD, LP, and cassette. Upon its release, Flood was met with praise from critics and achieved moderate success on sales charts. In 2013, the album was reissued as part of a CD series spanning They Might Be Giants' four Elektra releases.

== Background ==
Flood was They Might Be Giants' first release on a major label. Elektra Records approached the band in 1989 following the unexpected success of their second album, Lincoln, which was released on the independent Bar/None label. The record deal that Elektra presented was largely due to the work of Susan Drew, an A&R worker who had been following the band since 1986. Because of her confidence, the band was given an extensive level of creative control over their projects, in addition to the ability to take advantage of the label's resources. Although They Might Be Giants recorded the album as a duo, they were joined by several guest musicians on brass and string instruments. The band also enlisted Alan Bezozi to help program some of the electronic drums for the album.

== Recording and production ==
"We had never been in an actual, real, multitrack studio before. We had been in an 8-track studio run by a friend of ours that was essentially a demo place. But I didn't know anything about how to make a real record ... [Langer and Winstanley] approach production the way that we approach songwriting. That is, we let the song take us in whatever direction it seems to want to go."

— John Flansburgh

The album was recorded in the fall of 1989 at Skyline Studios in New York City. Skyline was only a few blocks away from the Public Access Synthesizer Studio, where the band had recorded their previous albums. Alan Bezozi and John Flansburgh worked together to create atypical drum tracks, including one that samples the sound of Flansburgh's kitchen sink and refrigerator being struck with a drumstick. An Alesis SR-16 drum machine was used to program the drums.

Two-thirds of the album's budget was spent on the production of four songs: "Birdhouse in Your Soul", "Your Racist Friend", "We Want a Rock", and "Istanbul (Not Constantinople)". These four tracks were produced by Clive Langer and Alan Winstanley.

== Composition ==
Like many of They Might Be Giants' early releases, Flood is stylistically eclectic. The press release for the album notes the "rock rave-up 'Twisting' ... the [country] inflected 'Lucky Ball & Chain' ... the existential oom-pah of 'Particle Man'", and "tender night-light metaphor and melody" of the lead single, "Birdhouse in Your Soul". Jon Pareles wrote for The New York Times that the album "shrug[s] off most typecasting". He added that through releases like Flood, They Might Be Giants and a new wave of alternative musicians were gainsaying the standard practice of sticking to only one genre.

"Birdhouse in Your Soul"
Chorus sample, including a shift from C major to E♭ major

Regardless of the genre employed, They Might Be Giants is noted for unconventional lyrics, characterized by "bizarre" cleverness. Flood includes abundant examples of this style, manifested in unusual subject matter, unreliable narrators, and wordplay. However, John Linnell and Flansburgh took care to avoid using humor excessively, acknowledging the requirement that recorded music withstand repeated listens without losing value. Linnell has pointed out that in general, he writes melodies prior to writing lyrics. This creates the challenge of fitting the appropriate syllables and stresses into each line; often, demos were recorded with dummy lyrics to simplify the process. Linnell's melodies are often based around scales. D. X. Ferris, with commentary from John Linnell and John Flansburgh, outlined each individual track from Flood in a retrospective article published in Rolling Stone.

"Theme From Flood" acts as a tongue-in-cheek introduction to the album, and it is regarded by scholars Elizabeth Sandifer and Alex Reed to be one of the first in a recurring trend of processional tunes composed by John Linnell. The track is followed by the album's lead single, "Birdhouse in Your Soul". Although the melody for "Birdhouse" was written years prior to the lyrics, the lyrics were "shoehorned in to match the melody", according to Linnell. The narrative is given from the point of view of a child's nightlight. According to John Linnell, the song was almost wrecked when he attempted to underscore it with a more dramatic drum track. Producers Winstanley and Langer opposed this decision and the drum track was scrapped. Linnell speculates that had this not been the case, the entire album might have suffered. Reed and Sandifer also note that the song makes an unanticipated jump from the key of C major to E♭ major and then back to C major. The track's later shifts to F♯ minor and A major lead to the division of the octave into equal intervals. Reed and Sandifer call Flood in general "modular" in its movement between musical ideas, which they attribute partly to its largely digital composition: the band's MIDI sequencer made it easy to transpose sections of a song out of the original key.

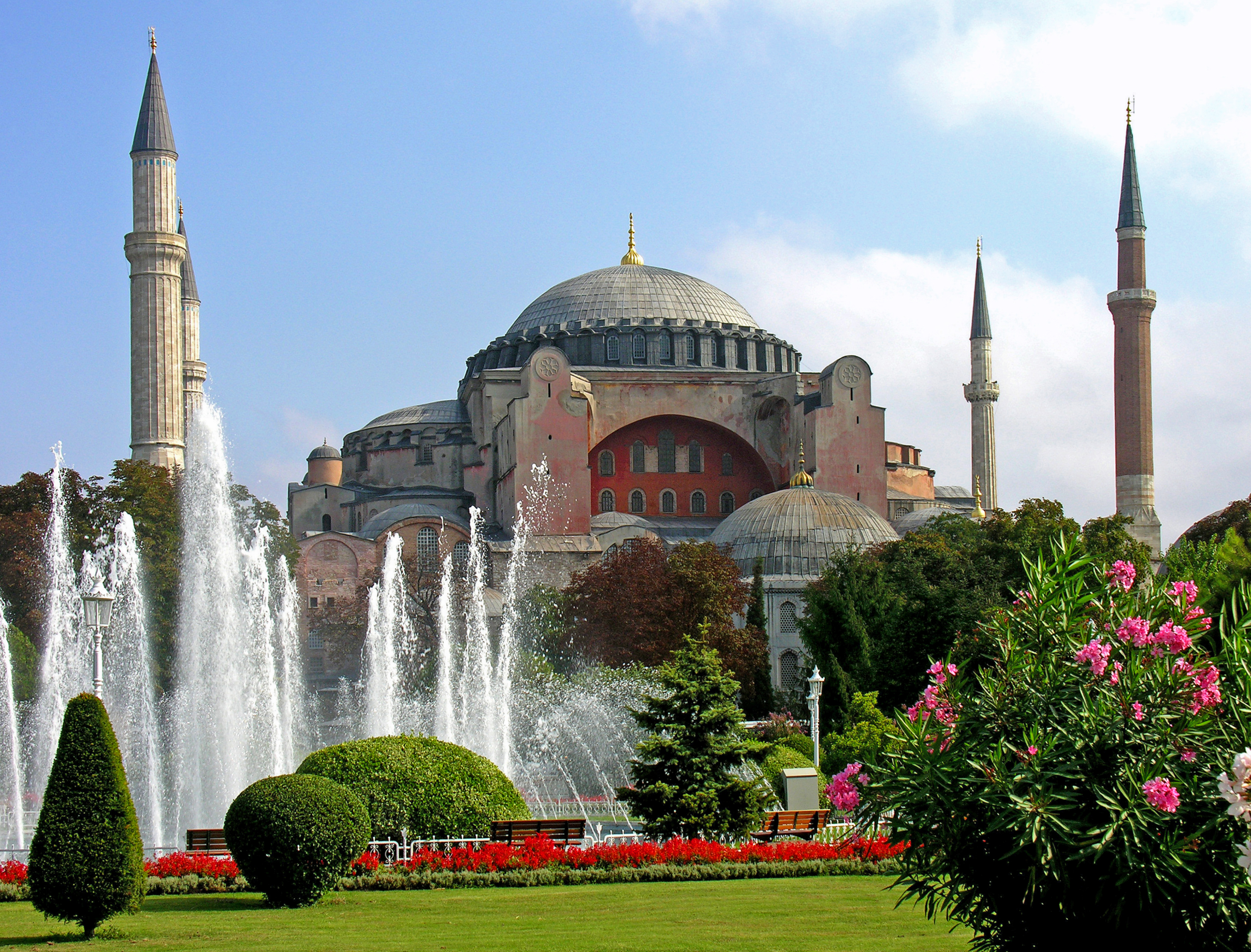
"Istanbul (Not Constantinople)" references both the current and previous names for modern-day Istanbul (Hagia Sophia pictured).

"Lucky Ball & Chain" employs the unreliable narrator motif, according to Linnell. Influenced by the country-western musical tradition, the song is a "simple regret song" dealing with "the one that got away". The fourth track and second single, "Istanbul (Not Constantinople)", a cover of the 1953 original, was added by Flansburgh and Linnell to their repertoire in the early 1980s to lengthen their live sets. From that point, it evolved from a folk-inspired cover to the baroque pop rendition that appears on Flood. A Casio FZ-1 synthesizer was used to perform the song in the studio. "Dead", described by Rolling Stone as "one of TMBG's most abstract and personal songs", follows the story of someone dying and then being "reincarnated as a bag of groceries". According to Linnell, "The dreamlike relationship between returning expired groceries and returning from the grave after you expire appealed to me."

"Your Racist Friend", produced by Langer and Winstanley, is a politically charged song which follows a fairly straightforward narrative. The song, which depicts a social conflict, is considered to be the band's clearest "political statement". On the other hand, the accordion-tinged "Particle Man" lightheartedly chronicles the disputes of four characters, the titular Particle Man, Universe Man, Person Man, and Triangle Man. Linnell has claimed that the character Triangle Man was inspired by Robert Mitchum's appearance in the 1955 film The Night of the Hunter. The final single, "Twisting", was selected over "Your Racist Friend", in part because it was more lyrically ambiguous. The song references both The Young Fresh Fellows and The dB's, two groups that influenced the sound of the track itself. Flansburgh has noted that, while recording the song, Bezozi accidentally erased the entire drum track for "Twisting". Flansburgh then had to recreate the track from scratch. The cryptic "We Want a Rock" features a violin performance by Mark Feldman, and "Someone Keeps Moving My Chair" revolves around petty concerns and their importance "when everything else is going haywire". "Hearing Aid" features the mixing of standard They Might Be Giants sounds with an Arto Lindsay guitar solo and vacuum cleaner synth sounds, experiments that Flansburgh found difficult to achieve.

"Minimum Wage", which features only those two words, saw the band dabbling in sampling (specifically the 1966 Frank Sinatra recording of "Downtown"). The sound of the whip was crafted in the studio when the band was unable to find a suitable stock sound effect; the effect was a composite of a wind sound from Linnell's Moog keyboard and the crack of a wet towel, courtesy of Roger Moutenot. "Letterbox", which was also considered as a potential single from the album, was another track that had been in live setlists years prior to the release of the album. For "Whistling in the Dark", Flansburgh and Linnell wanted the bass drum to be extremely pronounced, although they were later unhappy with the result. Linnell noted that, lyrically, the song is about two men who engage in a fight, only for the listener to soon learn that they are both in prison. "Hot Cha!" references the name of a wooden horse in the Parker Brothers board game Derby Day; musically, the song is a mix of eclectic sounds (such as the noise of mallets and drumsticks banging on a sink and base of a refrigerator), samples (such as a door buzzer), and unique recording methods (such as running horn samples through a guitar fuzz box). In the cheerful tune "Women and Men", the band examines human reproduction from a "disengaged view", and "Sapphire Bullets of Pure Love" takes its title from a Mahavishnu Orchestra album cut of the same name. "They Might Be Giants" operates as the band's manifesto and was inspired by The Monkees song "(Theme From) The Monkees". Flood concludes with "Road Movie to Berlin", which was written by John Flansburgh in Germany in 1989 (at which point the Berlin Wall still stood). The song deals with the clash between absurdism and existentialism that the band encountered while touring Europe. Flansburgh's voice was slowed down for this song, an effect that he later called "creepy". Due to the haste with which the final portion of the album was recorded, the band forgot to include an entire verse of the song in the finished product; Linnell and Flansburgh felt that they did not have the time to fix it, so the mistake remained. The song also makes use of "synthetic or sampled" trumpet sounds, one of which was also included in "Birdhouse in Your Soul".

== Artwork ==
The photograph used for the cover of the album depicts a man rowing a boat made out of strung-together washbasins. The image was captured by Margaret Bourke-White as part of a series taken to document the Ohio River flood of 1937. The cover, which was designed by band member John Flansburgh with Elizabeth van Itallie, originally featured only the photo; however, an emblem including the band's name, inked by Flansburgh's former coworker Barbara Lipp, was later added. The emblem resembles the logo of the International Alliance of Theatrical Stage Employees.

== Promotion ==
To promote Flood, Elektra produced a promotional video featuring Linnell and Flansburgh facetiously extolling the album's merits. One sarcastic quip was that the album included nineteen songs, which made it inherently better than other albums with fewer tracks. The video also included a live performance of "Particle Man" and a sample of the lead single "Birdhouse in Your Soul". The band also produced a music video, directed by Adam Bernstein, for "Birdhouse in Your Soul". In April, the band appeared on The Tonight Show Starring Johnny Carson to perform the song in a faster-tempo version accompanied by bandleader Doc Severinsen and the Tonight Show Band. Severinsen's unusually fast count-in resulted in a performance with a noticeably higher tempo than the album recording. Linnell and Flansburgh would later adopt a similar tempo for subsequent live performances.

=== Tour ===
In support of Flood, They Might Be Giants toured North America and Europe, including a series of shows in Germany. Due to the scale of the tour, the band's road crew doubled in size—increasing from two members to four. Linnell and Flansburgh have recounted the unfamiliarity of touring outside of North America. In Europe, they report that crowds acted differently due to cultural gaps.

The band continued to tour as a duo, with Linnell playing accordion and Flansburgh on guitars, or occasionally playing a marching band bass drum. Large posters of postage stamps adorned the stage as props; the minimal arrangement was received as a boldly simple choice. Sets included a combination of old and new material. As in the past, the band was backed by a tape deck playing drum tracks or a metronome in lieu of a full rhythm section.

== Critical reception ==
Professional ratings
Review scores
Source	Rating
AllMusic	4/5 stars
Chicago Tribune	3.5/4 stars
Los Angeles Times	3/5 stars
NME	8/10
Pitchfork	8.5/10
Q	4/5 stars
Record Mirror	4/5
Rolling Stone	2/5 stars
The Rolling Stone Album Guide	4/5 stars
Sounds	4/5 stars

Flood received generally positive reviews, though some critics expressed reservations. Chris Heim wrote for the Chicago Tribune that the album is a rare example of success for a "quirky cult band" signed to a major label. Steve Simels, writing for Stereo Review, compared the album's structural complexities to The Beach Boys at the peak of their career. Simels praised the album's originality and intellect, while heavily criticizing other contemporary music for lacking those characteristics. Writing in Spin, Ira Robbins called Flood "another captivating variety show of art-rock, swing, the Bonzo Dog Band, cow-pop, show tunes and the Schmenge Brothers ... Boundless imagination, loopy mix-and-match arrangements and a gyroscopic sense of what makes a pop tune click are still responsible for the easy and abiding appeal of TMBG's ingenious material." In a retrospective AllMusic review, Stephen Thomas Erlewine wrote that despite some inconsistencies and awkward selections, the album is musically superior to its predecessors. He observed that through Flood, Flansburgh and Linnell "exchange quirky artiness for unabashed geekiness". Six of the album's nineteen tracks are designated as AllMusic "picks". Reviewing the album in 2022 for Pitchfork, Quinn Moreland commented that the duo's "ability to grab listeners with sharp, catchy songwriting was never more evident than on ... Flood, where their expansive imagination was matched by major label money."

Reviews in the UK were also mostly positive. In a review for Q, Peter Kane lauded the record for its uniqueness and for the sheer quantity of tracks, which he said ensured that the listener would enjoy at least one song, and concluded that Flood was "as playful an entertainment as will be heard all year". In NME Jerry Smith called the collection "a weird and wonderful varied combination of the zany, trivial, witty and wacky, delivered with a spritely foot-tapping ease that belies their bizarre subject matter". Record Mirror's Iestyn George observed that "if it's to be faulted, the album is a mite too cluttered for its own good, but the virtues of imagination and originality that these native New Yorkers display are worthy of enthusiastic approval". Andy Ross of Sounds believed that it was the duo's melodic talents that prevented them from becoming just a novelty act, and wrote that Flood was "a real cryptic crossword of an album, requiring perseverance and application with ultimately rewarding and fulfilling results".

Conversely, Village Voice critic Robert Christgau and Rolling Stone's David Browne found Flood to be unremarkable overall. Both critics chastised the band's novelty, which they found to be wearing thin as time progressed. In the UK Caroline Sullivan of Melody Maker felt that enjoyment of Flood "hinges upon one's general feelings about similarly zany characters like Talking Heads and Frank Zappa. If their very American, very beatnik, surrealism spells instant yawnorama, forget TMBG—they're the same thing, but minus the good tunes." However, in a 2009 Rolling Stone article revisiting Flood near its twentieth anniversary, D. X. Ferris praised the album as both the band's most iconic release and one that revolutionized the college radio scene.

== Commercial performance ==
Flood peaked at number 75 on the Billboard 200, spending 22 weeks on the chart. The lead single from the album, "Birdhouse in Your Soul", reached number three on the Billboard Modern Rock Tracks chart. The single also charted in Ireland and the UK. "Twisting", which was released as a domestic promotional single, peaked at number 22 on the Billboard Modern Rock Tracks chart. The album also contains two of the band's most well-known songs, "Istanbul (Not Constantinople)" and "Particle Man". The former was released as a single, reaching number 61 on the UK Singles Chart, but failed to chart in the US.

Flood was the first album released by They Might Be Giants to receive the RIAA Platinum sales award—indicating sales over one million copies—which it achieved on July 10, 2009. It is also certified Gold by the BPI in the United Kingdom.

== Legacy ==
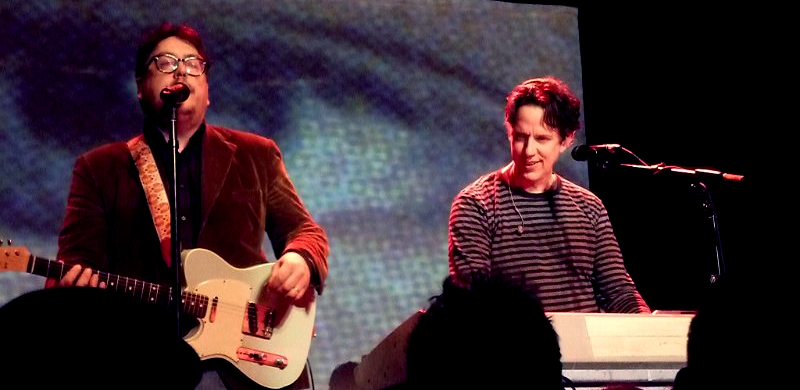
Flansburgh and Linnell in 2012 performing a dual Lincoln and Flood show

Flood is They Might Be Giants' best-selling album, and it is widely regarded as their most iconic. Due to the acclaim with which it was received, the album is considered to have cemented the band's reputation as a staple of alternative and college rock. Curtis Silver, in a retrospective for Wired, collected anecdotes from They Might Be Giants fans, many of whom were first exposed to the band through Flood. Silver concluded that new fans are drawn just as much to the band's old material as they are to their more recent work, due to its sustaining accessibility. In fact, many fans cite the band's earliest albums as their favorites—though often not Flood, despite (or perhaps due to) its longstanding mainstream success. Pitchfork ranked it the 25th best album of the 1990s.

In February 1991, Tiny Toon Adventures aired animated music videos for two tracks from the album, "Particle Man" and "Istanbul (Not Constantinople)". Through the program, the band was exposed to a younger set of fans. This ultimately led the band to begin releasing children's music alongside their "rock albums" over a decade later.

They Might Be Giants has performed Flood live in its entirety on numerous occasions. In 2015, the band released the live album Flood Live in Australia, a recording of the album played live in 2013, in which the songs are performed in reverse order, starting with "Road Movie to Berlin" and ending with "Theme From Flood". The band has performed multiple Flood concerts in the reverse-order format. In other shows, the songs are played out of sequence.

The band planned to perform a series of Flood concerts in early 2020 to celebrate the thirtieth anniversary of the album's release, but the tour was postponed due to the COVID-19 pandemic. The dates were rescheduled to between September 2020 and May 2021, but these were also postponed. Following this, the shows were rescheduled in early 2022, with 43 dates from June 2022 to May 2023. Some early tour dates were additionally postponed to later in the schedule due to Flansburgh suffering broken ribs in a car accident.

== Track listing ==
All tracks are written by John Flansburgh and John Linnell, except where noted.

Side one
No.	Title	Length
1.	"Theme From Flood"	0:28
2.	"Birdhouse in Your Soul"	3:20
3.	"Lucky Ball & Chain"	2:46
4.	"Istanbul (Not Constantinople)" (Jimmy Kennedy, Nat Simon)	2:38
5.	"Dead"	2:58
6.	"Your Racist Friend"	2:54
7.	"Particle Man"	1:59
8.	"Twisting"	1:56
9.	"We Want a Rock"	2:47

Side two
No.	Title	Length
10.	"Someone Keeps Moving My Chair"	2:23
11.	"Hearing Aid"	3:26
12.	"Minimum Wage"	0:47
13.	"Letterbox"	1:25
14.	"Whistling in the Dark"	3:25
15.	"Hot Cha"	1:34
16.	"Women & Men"	1:46
17.	"Sapphire Bullets of Pure Love"	1:36
18.	"They Might Be Giants"	2:46
19.	"Road Movie to Berlin"	2:22
Total length:		43:24

== Personnel ==
=== They Might Be Giants ===
- John Flansburgh – songwriting, vocals, guitar, programming, mandolin, trumpet
- John Linnell – songwriting, vocals, accordion, keyboards, saxophones, programming, melodica

=== Additional musicians ===
- Alan Bezozi – drum programming
- Mark Feldman – violin on "Birdhouse in Your Soul", "Istanbul", and "We Want a Rock"
- Rick McRae – trombone on "Theme From Flood" and "Whistling in the Dark"
- Frank London – trumpet on "Birdhouse in Your Soul", "Whistling in the Dark", and "They Might Be Giants"
- Charlie Sepulveda – trumpet on "Istanbul" and "Your Racist Friend"
- Marion Beckenstein – vocals on "Theme From Flood"
- Joel Mitchell – vocals on "Theme From Flood"
- The Skyline Staff – handclaps on "Particle Man"
- Arto Lindsay – guitar on "Hearing Aid"
- Roger Moutenot – whip on "Minimum Wage"

=== Production staff ===
- They Might Be Giants – producer
- Clive Langer – producer
- Alan Winstanley – producer
- Roger Moutenot – recording, mixing
- Paul Angelli – engineer
- Patrick Dillett – assistant engineer
- Katherine Miller – assistant engineer
- Alex Noyes – MIDI coordinator
- John Flansburgh – design
- Elizabeth van Itallie – design
- Helene Silverman – design consultant
- Margaret Bourke-White – photography
- Barbara Lipp – art assistance

== Chart performance ==
=== Album ===
Chart (1990)	Position
Australian Albums (ARIA)	99
UK Albums (Official Charts)	14
US Billboard 200	75

=== Singles ===
Year	Single	Chart	Peak position
1990	"Birdhouse in Your Soul"	Billboard Modern Rock Tracks	3
1990	"Birdhouse in Your Soul"	UK Singles Chart (OCC)	6
1990	"Birdhouse in Your Soul"	Irish Singles Chart (IRMA)	12
1990	"Istanbul (Not Constantinople)"	UK Singles Chart (OCC)	61
1990	"Twisting"	Billboard Modern Rock Tracks	22

== Certifications and sales ==
Region	Certification	Certified units/sales
United Kingdom (BPI)	Gold	100,000^{^}
United States (RIAA)	Platinum	1,000,000^{^}
^{^} Shipments figures based on certification alone.
