= Don't Let's Start =

Single by They Might Be Giants

from the album They Might Be Giants
- B-side: "We're the Replacements", "When It Rains It Snows", "The Famous Polka"
- Released: November 2, 1987
- Recorded: January 8, 1986
- Studio: Dubway Studio, New York City
- Genre: Alternative rock
- Length: 2:36
- Label: Bar/None, Restless; Elektra (Re-issue)
- Songwriters: John Flansburgh, John Linnell
- Producer: Bill Krauss

They Might Be Giants singles chronology
"Don't Let's Start" (1987)	"(She Was A) Hotel Detective" (1988)

Music video
- "Don't Let's Start" on YouTube

1990 Elektra Re-issue

"Don't Let's Start" is a song by American alternative rock duo They Might Be Giants, from their 1986 eponymous debut album. It was the first single released from the album, released as a maxi-single. The single peaked at number 94 on the Australian ARIA singles chart in 1988. It was re-released by Elektra in 1990 after the success of the band's third album, Flood.

== Lyrical content ==
The lyrics of "Don't Let's Start" include a number of dark, pointed statements, such as "everybody dies frustrated and sad, and that is beautiful." John Linnell has repeatedly insisted that some of the song's lyrical twists, though pondered extensively by fans, were constructed to complement the melody and were not necessarily meaningful. Asked about the origin of the song's obscure lyrics, Linnell replied "where did it come from? I made it up."

== Music video ==
A music video was produced for the song, and it found some success at that time on MTV. It was included on MTV's 1999 list of the "100 Greatest Music Videos Ever Made" at #89. The video was directed by Adam Bernstein and was filmed inside the New York State Pavilion in Flushing Meadows Park, the site of the 1964 New York World's Fair.

== Track listing ==
Maxi-single

1. "Don't Let's Start" (single mix) – 2:35
2. "We're The Replacements" – 1:55
3. "When It Rains It Snows" – 1:36
4. "The Famous Polka" – 1:32

1990 maxi-single re-release

1. "Don't Let's Start" (single mix) – 2:35
2. "Your Racist Friend" (remix) – 3:50
3. "She's an Angel" – 2:37
4. "Absolutely Bill's Mood" – 2:38

1990 single re-release

1. "Don't Let's Start" (single mix) – 2:35
2. "Letterbox" – 1:25
3. "Sapphire Bullets of Pure Love" – 1:36

== Personnel ==
- John Flansburgh – electric guitar, bass guitar
- John Linnell – lead vocals, keyboards

== Chart performance ==
Chart (1988)	Peak position
US Alternative (CMJ New Music Report)	11
Australia (ARIA Charts)	94

== Other versions ==
- The song was covered by the band Common Rotation on their 2003 album The Big Fear.
- Jimmy Eat World quotes the song in "A Praise Chorus" on their 2001 album Bleed American. The part is sung by guest vocalist Davey von Bohlen of the Promise Ring.
