= Istanbul (Not Constantinople) =

1953 novelty song by Jimmy Kennedy and Nat Simon

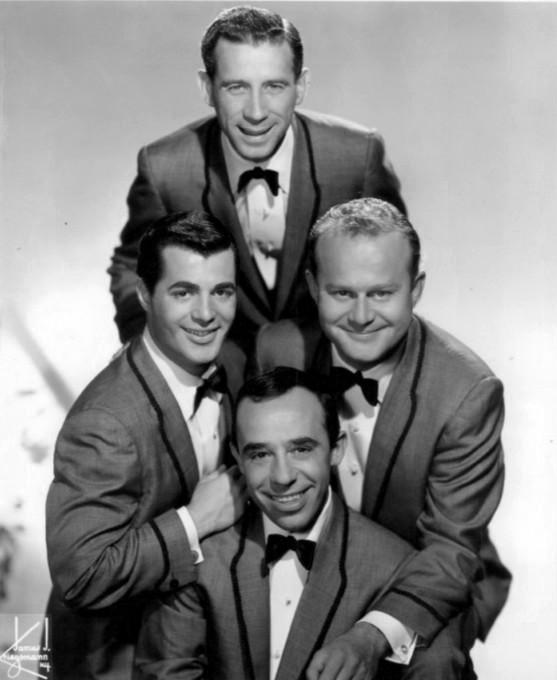
Canadian singing quartet The Four Lads, original artists of the song "Istanbul" with lyrics by Irish songwriter Jimmy Kennedy

"Istanbul (Not Constantinople)" is a 1953 novelty song, with lyrics by Jimmy Kennedy and music by Nat Simon. The song features the "Arabian riff," also known as "The Streets of Cairo." It was written on the 500th anniversary of the fall of Constantinople to the Ottomans. The lyrics humorously refer to the official renaming of the city of Constantinople to Istanbul. The song's original release, performed by The Four Lads, was certified as a gold record. Numerous cover versions have been recorded over the years, most famously a 1990 version by They Might Be Giants.

== Musical influences ==
Jazz historian Will Friedwald mentioned that the song is an answer to "C-O-N-S-T-A-N-T-I-N-O-P-L-E", written by Harry Carlton and recorded in 1928 by Paul Whiteman and His Orchestra.

== The Four Lads original version ==
"Istanbul (Not Constantinople)" was originally recorded by Canadian vocal quartet The Four Lads on August 12, 1953. This recording was released by Columbia Records as catalog number 40082. It first reached the Billboard magazine charts on October 24, 1953, and it peaked at No. 10. It was the group's first gold record.

== Cover versions ==
=== Frankie Vaughan ===
Frankie Vaughan's 1954 version for His Master's Voice reached the UK charts that year with a peak position of No. 11.

=== Col Joye's Joy Boys ===
Col Joye's backing band recorded an instrumental version on the Festival label, which peaked at No. 16 in November 1960 according to the back-then Australian charts, ending up as No. 95 for the 1961 year-end ranking.

=== Bing Crosby ===
Bing Crosby began performing a version on his weekly radio show The Bing Crosby Show for General Electric. It was first broadcast as a duet with Ella Fitzgerald at the end of 1953, and later with Connie Russell in early 1954. It featured John Scott Trotter's Orchestra and trumpet soloist Ziggy Elman.

=== Bette Midler ===
Bette Midler performed the song as part of her 1976 special for Home Box Office, Live at Last. It appears on the album of the same name.

=== Big Muffin Serious Band ===
Big Muffin Serious Band, a ukulele-based music performance group from New Zealand, released a cover on their LP Jabberwocky Goes to Town in 1987.

=== They Might Be Giants ===
"Istanbul (Not Constantinople)"

Single by They Might Be Giants

from the album Flood
- B-side: "James K. Polk"
- Released: May 14, 1990
- Genre: Alternative dance; klezmer
- Length: 2:34
- Label: Elektra (US); Elektra / WEA (Europe)
- Composer: Nat Simon
- Lyricist: Jimmy Kennedy
- Producers: Clive Langer; Alan Winstanley

They Might Be Giants singles chronology
"Birdhouse in Your Soul" (1989)	"Istanbul (Not Constantinople)" (1990)	"Twisting" (1990)

Music video
- Istanbul (Not Constantinople) on YouTube

One of the best-known versions of "Istanbul (Not Constantinople)" is the cover by American alternative rock band They Might Be Giants, who released it as the second single on their album Flood in 1990. They Might Be Giants' version is at a faster tempo than the original. The music video was featured in the first season of MTV's Liquid Television. The single reached number 61 on the UK Singles Chart in 1990. They Might Be Giants later recorded an electronic version of the song for their 2011 compilation album, Album Raises New and Troubling Questions.

The song is prominently featured in the 1991 episode "Tiny Toon Music Television", of Tiny Toon Adventures, for a music video segment featuring Plucky Duck trying to find a missing statue. It was used as the theme in the 1992 TV movie Black Magic, starring Judge Reinhold. It plays as an ending to the 2005 episode "Mobile Homer", of The Simpsons. The song plays during a donut shop fight scene in the 2019 series premiere, "We Only See Each Other at Weddings and Funerals", of The Umbrella Academy.

=== The Sacados ===
A Spanish language version called "Estambul" was recorded by Argentine synth-pop trio the Sacados in 1990. The song was included on their debut album Te pido + respeto (1990).

=== The Muppets ===
In Season 2, Episode 4 (October 12, 1997, U.S. release) of the television series Muppets Tonight, portions of the song were performed by a quartet of rats in kaftans and fezzes.

=== The Trevor Horn Orchestra ===
An orchestra version by the Trevor Horn Orchestra was recorded for the 2003 film Mona Lisa Smile, starring Julia Roberts. It used as background music.

=== Bart & Baker ===
Electro swing duo Bart & Baker covered the song for their album The Jet Lag EP (2012). Another version called "Istanbul 2016" was included on their curation album Best of Electro Swing by Bart & Baker (2016).

=== PJ Harvey ===
PJ Harvey used a loop of the song as inspiration for the title track of her 2011 album Let England Shake. Her release Let England Shake – Demos revealed that the Four Lads original recording was used as a constant sound bed under Let England Shake with Harvey singing lyrics from the song at the end of demo.

=== Hakan A. Toker ===
Pianist Hakan A. Toker arranged an improvisation on the tune for his 2019 album Messing Around... with the Classics ;). He named it "Istanbul Not Quite Constantinople."

=== Other versions in live performances ===
The Doox of Yale, an a cappella group at Yale University, perform the song at the end of most of their concerts. The song has been in the repertoire of the group since 1953 (when they were known as the Duke's Men).

During the 2000s, the song was performed live by Australian klezmer/gypsy jazz band Monsieur Camembert, appearing on the album Live on Stage.

Guitarist Trey Anastasio has teased the song on numerous occasions with Phish and with his own band, Trey Anastasio Band.
