= They Might Be Giants (album) =

Studio album by They Might Be Giants
- Released: November 4, 1986
- Recorded: Summer 1985–August 1986
- Studios: Studio Pass and Dubway Studios, NYC
- Genres: New wave; post-punk; college rock; art pop
- Length: 38:29
- Labels: Restless; Bar/None
- Producer: Bill Krauss

They Might Be Giants chronology
Wiggle Diskette (1985)	They Might Be Giants (1986)	Lincoln (1988)

Singles from They Might Be Giants
- 1. "Don't Let's Start" Released: November 2, 1987; 2. "(She Was A) Hotel Detective" Released: May 5, 1988

They Might Be Giants, sometimes called The Pink Album, is the debut studio album from American alternative rock band They Might Be Giants. It was released by Bar/None in 1986. The album generated two singles, "Don't Let's Start" and "(She Was A) Hotel Detective". It is included on Then: The Earlier Years, a compilation of the band's early material, in its entirety, with the exception of "Don't Let's Start", which is replaced with the single mix for the compilation.

"Don't Let's Start", one of the album's two singles, is cited as a key track in the band's catalogue, and its success contributed positively to the sale of the album. As a result of this prominence, when the band made the move to the major label Elektra Records, "Don't Let's Start" was reissued in Europe with alternative B-sides.

In July 2014, the band released a live version of the album at no charge on NoiseTrade. All the songs were recorded during the band's 2013 tour.

== Recording and production ==
They Might Be Giants was the second album to be released on the fledgling Bar/None label, with They Might Be Giants as the second group signed to the independent label. Many of the songs on the album existed in a demo form on the band's 1985 demo tape, which was also technically self-titled, though many were re-recorded or given new mixes for the commercial album. The material from the tape was recorded at Studio PASS in New York City with the assistance of Alex Noyes, who permitted the band to use the studio after it closed each day. Additional recording and mixing was done at Dubway Studios.

Some unconventional recording techniques were used in the production of the album. The music is melodic, mostly uptempo synthesizer-and-guitar pop punctuated with odd sound samples and occasionally veering into sparse country- or folk-like arrangements. Drum and bass tracks are almost entirely synthesized, though the album prominently features the accordion. In order to record the guitar solo in "Absolutely Bill's Mood", the band telephoned Eugene Chadbourne in Greensboro, NC, from Dubway Studios. Chadbourne played the acoustic solo and it was recorded onto the studio's answering machine, then mixed into the song.

Flansburgh and Linnell occasionally borrow from other recordings throughout the album. "Rhythm Section Want Ad" features an excerpt from Raymond Scott's composition "Powerhouse", played on the accordion. "Boat of Car" prominently samples the Johnny Cash song "Daddy Sang Bass".

== Release and commercial performance ==
The record sold 10,000 copies in its first year. After Bar/None founders Tom Prendergast and Glenn Morrow got TMBG airplay on MTV, sales dramatically increased. According to Prendergast, "Within another month, we sold another 40,000 records." Total sales eventually passed 100,000, and a follow-up album, also on Bar/None, more than doubled the sales of the first. "That established the label," Prendergast said.

== Promotion and packaging ==
Music videos were produced for the album's two singles, "Don't Let's Start" and "(She Was A) Hotel Detective", both directed by Adam Bernstein. Significantly, prior to the album's release, a music video was also created for the song "Put Your Hand Inside the Puppet Head". This was the first commercial video ever shot by the band, and was also directed by Bernstein. A music video was also shot for the song "Rabid Child", but it was never released and remains largely unavailable for public viewing to this day.

The album's cover art was illustrated by Rodney Alan Greenblat, who had no prior association with the band. It extends to the back cover of the album, and shows John Linnell and John Flansburgh riding a large blue dog. John Linnell commented that the illustration caused the record to be mistaken for a children's album. The art was pasted up by John Flansburgh.

== Critical reception ==
Professional ratings
Review scores
Source	Rating
AllMusic	4.5/5 stars
NME	6/10
Q	4/5 stars
The Rolling Stone Album Guide	3.5/5 stars
The Village Voice	A

The album was received with positive critical attention. Robert Christgau of The Village Voice, who gave the album an A, praised the album for its wide range of variety and cleverness, saying "the hits just keep on coming in an exuberantly annoying show of creative superabundance." He also made note of the unusualness of the subject matter contained in the lyrics. Jim Farber of Rolling Stone stressed the album's "weirdness," and also noted the diversity in style among songs that "incorporate genres from art pop to country to polka."

Neither the album nor its singles saw success on the Billboard charts, but the three music videos associated with the album generated positive attention for the band.

== Track listing ==
All tracks are written by John Flansburgh and John Linnell.

Side one
No.	Title	Lead vocals	Length
1.	"Everything Right Is Wrong Again"	John Linnell	2:20
2.	"Put Your Hand Inside the Puppet Head"	John Flansburgh	2:12
3.	"Number Three"	Flansburgh / Linnell	1:27
4.	"Don't Let's Start"	Linnell	2:36
5.	"Hide Away Folk Family"	Flansburgh	3:21
6.	"32 Footsteps"	Linnell	1:36
7.	"Toddler Hiway"	Flansburgh	0:25
8.	"Rabid Child"	Flansburgh	1:31
9.	"Nothing's Gonna Change My Clothes"	Linnell	1:58

Side two
No.	Title	Lead Vocals	Length
10.	"(She Was A) Hotel Detective"	Flansburgh	2:10
11.	"She's an Angel"	Linnell	2:37
12.	"Youth Culture Killed My Dog"	Flansburgh	2:51
13.	"Boat of Car"	Margaret Seiler	1:15
14.	"Absolutely Bill's Mood"	Flansburgh	2:38
15.	"Chess Piece Face"	Flansburgh	1:21
16.	"I Hope That I Get Old Before I Die"	Flansburgh / Linnell	1:58
17.	"Alienation's for the Rich"	Flansburgh	2:25
18.	"The Day"	Flansburgh	1:27
19.	"Rhythm Section Want Ad"	Linnell	2:21
Total length:			38:29

=== 2013 Australian bonus tracks ===
No.	Title	Length
1.	"Don't Let's Start" (single mix)	2:35
2.	"We're The Replacements"	1:50
3.	"When It Rains It Snows"	1:33
4.	"The Famous Polka"	1:33
5.	"(She Was A) Hotel Detective" (single mix)	2:22
6.	"For Science"	1:19
7.	"The Biggest One"	1:22
8.	"Kiss Me, Son of God" (alternate version)	1:49
9.	"Mr. Klaw"	1:19
10.	"Critic Intro"	1:37
11.	"Now That I Have Everything"	2:20
12.	"Mainstream USA"	1:15
13.	"Fake Out in Buenos Aires"	1:48
14.	"Greek #3"	1:29
15.	"I Hope That I Get Old Before I Die" (original version)	1:12
16.	"I'm Def"	1:08
17.	"Don't Let's Start" (demo)	1:14
18.	"'85 Radio Special Thank You"	1:45
19.	"Untitled"	2:33

== Personnel ==
=== They Might Be Giants ===
- John Flansburgh – lead vocals (2, 3, 5, 7, 8, 10, 12, 14–18), electric guitar (1, 3–5, 9–13, 16, 17, 19), bass (2–5, 12, 13, 16, 17, 19), backing vocals (6, 10, 18), harmonica (6), acoustic guitar (12, 17)
- John Linnell – lead vocals (1, 4, 6, 9, 11, 16, 19), keyboard (1, 2, 4–6, 8, 9, 12–16, 19), piano (1), accordion (2, 5, 6, 11, 16–19), backing vocals (3, 5, 9, 12, 16, 19), bass saxophone, baritone saxophone (10); synth bass (11)

=== Additional musicians ===
- Eugene Chadbourne – phoned-in guitar (14)
- Margaret Seiler – lead vocals (13)

=== Production ===
- Bill Krauss – producer, engineer
- Mark Boyer – executive producer
- Matthew Hill – executive producer
- Al Houghton – engineer
- Alex Noyes – engineer
- Rodney Alan Greenblat – cover art

== Charts ==
Chart performance for They Might Be Giants
Chart (1990)	Peak position
Australian Albums (ARIA)	159
