= Jonathan Coulton discography =

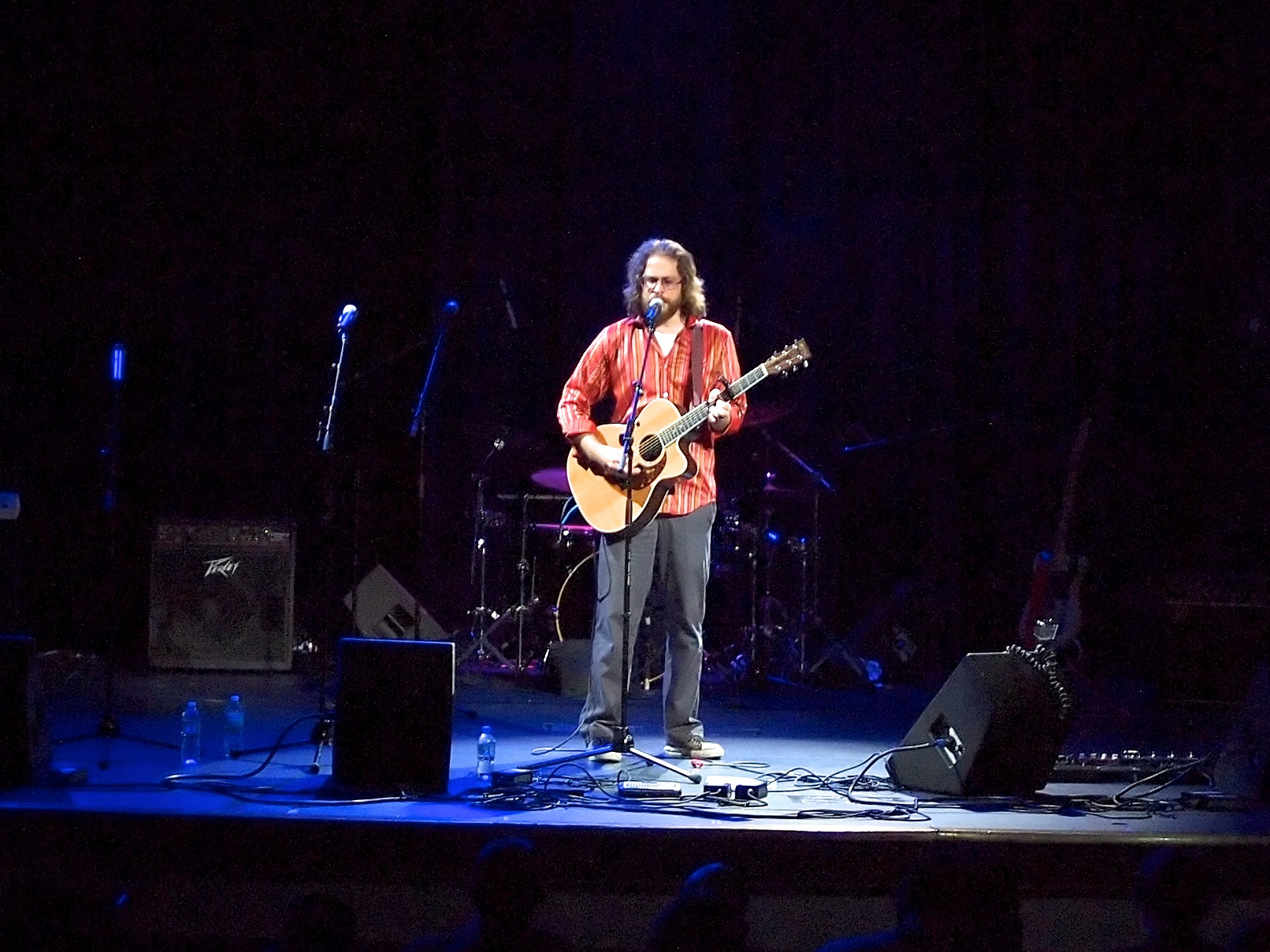
- Studio albums: 10
- Live albums: 2
- Compilation albums: 1
- Singles: 3

This is the discography of singer/songwriter Jonathan Coulton.

== Studio albums ==
Year	Title	Notes
2003	Smoking Monkey: Produced by Jonathan Coulton; Released on November 5, 2003	Debut album; Recorded in Pro Tools and SAW Pro
2004	Where Tradition Meets Tomorrow: Produced by Jonathan Coulton; Released on October 1, 2004	Five song EP; Contains a number of Coulton's biggest hits
2005	Our Bodies, Ourselves, Our Cybernetic Arms: Produced by Jonathan Coulton; Released on September 1, 2005	Five song EP; Written and recorded based on articles in Popular Science Magazine
2006	Thing a Week One: Produced by Jonathan Coulton; Released on August 31, 2006	First season of Thing a Week; Contains "Baby Got Back" and "Shop Vac"
2006	Thing a Week Two: Produced by Jonathan Coulton; Released on November 2, 2006	Second season of Thing a Week; Contains "Re: Your Brains" and "A Talk with George"
2006	Thing a Week Three: Produced by Jonathan Coulton; Released on December 15, 2006	Third season of Thing a Week; Contains "Code Monkey" and "Tom Cruise Crazy"
2006	Thing a Week Four: Produced by Jonathan Coulton; Released on December 15, 2006	Fourth season of Thing a Week; Contains "Creepy Doll" and "Mr. Fancy Pants"
2011	Artificial Heart: Produced by John Flansburgh; Released on November 8, 2011	First professional studio album; Performed by full band
2017	Solid State: Label: Super Ego Records; Released on April 28, 2017	A self-professed concept album
2019	Some Guys: Label: Jonathon Coulton; Released on March 26, 2019	An album of covers of 70's soft rock songs that sound exactly like the originals.

== Live albums ==
Year	Title	Notes
2009	Best. Concert. Ever.: Live in San Francisco, California; Released in May 2009	Two disc CD/DVD set; Recorded in 2008 at the Great American Music Hall
2014	JoCo Live: Live in the United States; Released in October 2014	Recorded in December 2012 at various venues in the United States, including Dallas, TX.

== Compilation albums ==
Year	Title	Notes
2008	JoCo Looks Back: First "Best Of" album; Released on October 22, 2008	Compiled from first 7 studio albums; First stereo release of "Code Monkey"

== Singles ==
Year	Title	Notes
2011	"Nemeses": Produced by John Flansburgh; Released on July 28, 2011	First single from Artificial Heart; Lead vocals performed by John Roderick
2011	"Good Morning Tucson": Produced by John Flansburgh; Released on August 25, 2011	Second single from Artificial Heart; Released by Blurt
2013	"Baby Got Back (In the Style of Glee)": Released on January 26, 2013	Identical to version on Thing a Week One; Released as a response to the TV show Glee copying his song without permission
2017	"All This Time": Released on February 28, 2017	Only single from Solid State; First performed live at JoCo Cruise 2016

== Other releases ==
- The Aftermath - Unreleased studio recordings, produced between Thing a Week and Artificial Heart.
- Unplugged - Live on Second Life, bootleg of online concert.
- Other Experiments - Rarities collection, contains unreleased songs and demos.
- "Still Alive" written for the video game, Portal. Vocals by Ellen McLain. Later re-recorded for Artificial Heart.
- "Want You Gone" written for the video game, Portal 2. Vocals by Ellen McLain.
- "You Wouldn't Know" written for the video game, Lego Dimensions. Vocals by Ellen McLain.
- "Redshirts", written for the book of the same name by John Scalzi.
- "GlaDOS Song" written originally for the video game, Portal 2 as an Easter egg but was cut during production. It was later released on his SoundCloud account. Vocals by Ellen McLain.
- "The Princess Who Saved Herself" included on Many Hands for Haiti benefit compilation.
