= Redshirts (song) =

2012 song by Jonathan Coulton

"Redshirts" is a song by Jonathan Coulton, a singer/songwriter most famously known for creating "Still Alive" and "Want You Gone", from the Portal series. "Redshirts" was written to accompany the book of the same name, written by John Scalzi. It is about the hardship faced by Star Trek characters, labeled by their redshirts, who die many episodes of the series.
