= Press Start: Symphony of Games =

Series of Japanese video game music concerts

The logo of the Press Start 2006 -Symphony of Games- concert

Press Start -Symphony of Games- is a series of Japanese video game music concerts introduced in 2006. It was initiated by several industry professionals and is sponsored by the Japanese publishing company Enterbrain.

== Development ==
Inspired by the big success of earlier events, such as the Orchestral Game Music Concerts and the Symphonic Game Music Concerts, several industry professionals collaborated to create a new Japanese game concert series. In 2006, conductor Taizo Takemoto, game designer Masahiro Sakurai, scenario writer Kazushige Nojima and composers Nobuo Uematsu and Shogo Sakai formed an executive committee to develop Press Start. Hoping to distinguish the performances from foreign concerts and making it better than the other series, Uematsu preferred to select only music from Japanese games, though Press Start was always designed not to be limited to just one game series or console.

== Press Start 2006 -Symphony of Games- ==
Date: September 22
Venue: Bunkamura Orchard Hall
Conductor: Taizo Takemoto
Orchestra: Tokyo City Philharmonic Orchestra

Press Start 2006 marked the first Japanese orchestral performance of music from various game series after the ten-year hiatus following the Orchestral Game Music Concert 5. The event took place one day before the Tokyo Game Show opened for the public and was presented by Rie Tanaka, with Sakurai and Uematsu joining her as commentators. Additionally, every track featured guest appearances of the respective composers telling an anecdote from the time they composed that specific soundtrack. The executive committee expressed its satisfaction with the concert afterwards and announced there were plans for another event at a bigger concert hall in 2007.

Program:

| | Japanese title | Translated title |
|---|---|---|
| 1-1 | 「Metal Gear Solid 2 －Sons of Liberty－」 より Main Theme | Main Theme from Metal Gear Solid 2 -Sons of Liberty- |
| 1-2 | 落ち物メドレー | Falling Things Medley |
| 1-3 | ポポロクロイス物語 | PoPoLoCrois Story |
| 1-4 | Motherメドレー | Mother Medley |
| 1-5 | 「アウトラン」 より SPLASH WAVE | Splash Wave from OutRun |
| 1-6 | 「Anubis Zone of the Enders」 より Beyond the Bounds | Beyond the Bounds from Anubis: Zone of the Enders |
| 1-7 | イース | Ys |
| 2-1 | 「ロマンシング サガ －ミンストレルソング－」 より オーバーチュア～オープニングタイトル | Overture ~ Opening Title from Romancing SaGa -Minstrel Song- |
| 2-2 | 「モンスターハンター」 より 英雄の証 | Proof of a Hero from Monster Hunter |
| 2-3 | ICO －You Were There－ | Ico -You Were There- |
| 2-4 | ナムコ アーケードメドレー | Namco Arcade Medley |
| 2-5 | ゼルダの伝説メドレー 2006 | The Legend of Zelda Medley 2006 |
| E-1 | ファイナルファンタジー メインテーマ | Final Fantasy Main Theme |
| E-2 | 「大乱闘スマッシュブラザーズX」 より メインテーマ | Main Theme from Great Melee Smash Brothers X |

== Press Start 2007 -Symphony of Games- ==
Date and venue (Yokohama): September 17, Pacifico Yokohama
Date and venue (Osaka): September 22, Umeda Arts Theater
Conductor: Taizo Takemoto
Orchestra: Press Start Gadget Orchestra and Press Start 2007 Chorus

Due to positive reactions and support from fans, the series was expanded to offer two performances in Yokohama and Osaka, allowing more people to attend the event in 2007. Both concerts featured exclusive tracks that were not performed at the other venue and were accompanied by game footage on a big screen. Press Start 2007 was presented by Chisa Yokoyama.

Program:

| | Japanese title | Translated title |
|---|---|---|
| 1-1 | 「大乱闘スマッシュブラザーズX」 より メインテーマ | Main Theme from Super Smash Bros. Brawl |
| 1-2 | 「ロコロコ」 より ロコロコのうた | LocoRoco Song from LocoRoco |
| 1-3 | アクトレイザー | ActRaiser |
| 1-4 | シューティングメドレー | Shooting Medley |
| 1-5 | 「エースコンバット・ゼロ ザ・ベルカン・ウォー」 より; ZERO | Zero from Ace Combat Zero: The Belkan War |
| 1-6 | 「ワンダと巨像」 より 異形の者たち～巨像との戦い～ 甦る力～巨像との戦い～ | The Grotesque Ones ~Battle with the Colossus~; Revived Power ~Battle with the Colossus~ from Shadow of the Colossus |
| 1-7 | 「ファイアーエムブレム」 より ファイアーエムブレムのテーマ | Fire Emblem Theme from Fire Emblem |
| Y-2-1 | SEGA サウンドユニット [H.] | Sega Sound Unit [H.] |
| O-2-1 | ghm sound team | ghm sound team |
| 2-2 | 「クロノ・トリガー」 より クロノ・トリガーのテーマ | Chrono Trigger Theme from Chrono Trigger |
| 2-3 | The Elder Scrolls IV: Oblivion | The Elder Scrolls IV: Oblivion |
| 2-4 | 「スーパーマリオブラザーズ」 より コースBGMメドレー | Course BGM Medley from Super Mario Bros. |
| 2-5 | 「悪魔城ドラキュラ」 より 悪魔城ドラキュラ～ドラキュラII「呪いの封印」～悪魔城伝説～ 悪魔城ドラキュラX「血の輪廻」～ | Devil's Castle Dracula ~ Dracula II "The Seal of the Curse" ~ Devil's Castle Legend ~ Castlevania: Rondo of Blood ~ from Castlevania |
| 2-6 | 「サクラ大戦」 より 檄！帝国華撃団 | Manifesto! Imperial Flower Assault Troupe from Sakura Wars |
| 2-7 | 「キングダム ハーツ」 より | From Kingdom Hearts |
| E-1 | ゼルダの伝説メドレー 2006 | The Legend of Zelda Medley 2006 |
| E-2 | 「ファイナルファンタジーVII アドベントチルドレン」 より 再臨:片翼の天使 | Advent: One-Winged Angel from Final Fantasy VII: Advent Children |

== Press Start 2008 -Symphony of Games- ==
Date and venue (Tokyo): September 14, Bunkamura Orchard Hall
Date and venue (Shanghai): October 31, Shanghai International Gymnastic Center
Conductor: Taizo Takemoto
Orchestra: Kanagawa Philharmonic Orchestra

In 2008, the series expanded again to hold one concert in Tokyo and one in Shanghai, China. Both performances were presented by Keiko Washino. The event in China dropped some of the new arrangements and replaced them with tracks from earlier Press Start concerts.

Program:

| | Japanese title | Translated title |
|---|---|---|
| 1-1 | ワイルドアームズ セカンドイグニッション | Wild Arms Second Ignition |
| 1-2 | スーパーマリオギャラクシー2008 | Super Mario Galaxy 2008 |
| 1-3 | スペランカー | Spelunker |
| 1-4 | 逆転裁判 | Turnabout Trial |
| 1-5 | サムライスピリッツ | Samurai Spirits |
| 1-6 | 若かりし頃の植松伸夫メドレー | When Nobuo Uematsu Was Young Medley |
| 1-7 | モンスターハンターより「英雄の証」 | "Proof of a Hero" from Monster Hunter |
| 2-1 | バテン・カイトスより「光星煌めく旅路の果てへ」 | "To the End of the Journey of Twinkling Stars" from Baten Kaitos: Eternal Wings and the Lost Ocean |
| 2-2 | Touch！ Generations メドレー | Touch! Generations Medley |
| 2-3 | イース | Ys |
| 2-4 | レイトン教授と不思議な町 | Professor Layton and the Mysterious Town |
| 2-5 | ロックマン2 | Rockman 2 |
| 2-6 | ファイナルファンタジーIXより「Melodies Of Life」 | "Melodies Of Life" from Final Fantasy IX |
| E-1 | ソニック・ザ・ヘッジホッグ | Sonic the Hedgehog |
| E-2 | クロノ・トリガー&クロノ・クロス | Chrono Trigger & Chrono Cross |

== Press Start 2009 -Symphony of Games- ==
Date: August 2
Venue: Tokyo Metropolitan Art Space

Two concerts were held at the same venue in the Ikebukuro district of Tokyo, with one performance beginning in the early afternoon and the other one in the evening.

Program:

| | Japanese title | Translated title |
|---|---|---|
| 1-1 | 『ペルソナ4』より 全ての人の魂の詩/Reach Out To The Truth/記憶の片隅 | Poem of the Human Soul / Reach Out To The Truth / A Corner of the Memory from Persona 4 |
| 1-2 | 『スーパーマリオブラザーズ』より 『スーパーマリオブラザーズ』メドレー | "Super Mario Bros." Medley from Super Mario Bros. |
| 1-3 | 『弟切草&かまいたちの夜』より 館までの道で (弟切草)/奈美の思い出 (弟切草)/レクイエム (かまいたちの夜)/悪夢 (かまいたちの夜) | On the Way to the Mansion (Hypericum) / Nami's Recollections (Hypericum) / Requiem (The Night of the Sickle Weasels) / Ausviederzen (The Night of the Sickle Weasels) from Hypericum & The Night of the Sickle Weasels |
| 1-4 | 『幻想水滸伝』より 幻想の世界へ | To Shvëderlund from Fantasy Suikoden |
| 1-5 | "ファミコンここまで出てるのに"メドレー | "Famicom Released Up to Now" Medley |
| 1-6 | 『ポータル』より; Still Alive | Still Alive from Portal |
| 2-1 | 『大神(Okami)』より 始まり/両島原 其の二/「Reset」～「ありがとう」バージョン～ | The Beginning / Ryoshima Plains II / "Reset" ~"Thank You" Version~ from Ōkami |
| 2-2 | 『エースコンバット･ゼロ ザ･ベルカン・ウォー』より; Zero | Zero from Ace Combat Zero: The Belkan War |
| 2-3 | 『リズム天国』より 忍者 | Ninja Bodyguard from Rhythm Heaven |
| 2-4 | 『ファンタジーゾーン』より メドレー1(ラウンド1～3、ボス、ゲームオーバー)/メドレー2(ラウンド5、ショップ、大ボス、エンディング) | Medley 1 (Round 1~3, Boss, Game Over) / Medley 2 (Round 5, Shop, Big Boss, Ending) from Fantasy Zone |
| 2-5 | 『俺の屍を越えてゆけ』より 花 | Flower from Over My Dead Body |
| 2-6 | 『テイルズ オブ レジェンディア』より melfes～輝ける青 | melfes ~ Shining Blue from Tales of Legendia |
| E-1 | 『ファイナルファンタジーX』より ザナルカンドにて | At Zanarkand from Final Fantasy X |
| E-2 | 『星のカービィ』より タイトル/Green Greens/Float Islands/やきいもシューティング/デデデ大王のテーマ/エンディング | Title / Green Greens / Float Islands / Roasted Sweet Potato Shooting / King Dedede's Theme / Ending from Kirby of the Stars |
