= Cara Mia (disambiguation) =

"Cara Mia" is a 1954 song, a hit for English singer David Whitfield in 1954 and the American pop group Jay and the Americans in 1965 as well as many other artists.

Cara Mia (translated from the Italian, "My beloved") may also refer to:

- "Cara Mia", a 1977 song by Baccara
- "Cara Mia" (Måns Zelmerlöw song), a 2007 song by Swedish singer Måns Zelmerlöw
- "Cara Mia Addio", a song in the 2011 video game Portal 2
- Cara Mia Wayans (born 1987), American actress

== See also ==
- Kara Mia, a 2019 Philippine television drama series that aired on GMA Network
