= The Aftermath (Jonathan Coulton album) =

Studio album by Jonathan Coulton
- Released: 2009
- Recorded: 2007–2009
- Genre: Folk rock, powerpop
- Producer: Jonathan Coulton

Jonathan Coulton chronology
| Best. Concert. Ever. (2009) | The Aftermath (2009) | Artificial Heart (2011) |

The Aftermath is a collection of songs released by comedy rock musician Jonathan Coulton in the "aftermath" of his Thing a Week project. It was originally intended to be Coulton's eighth studio album, but after John Flansburgh convinced him to start recording in a professional studio, Coulton decided to scrap the project and start anew for his next album, which later became Artificial Heart. Tracks 6–9 were written and recorded as part of FRED Entertainment's "Masters of Song Fu" competition.

== Track listing ==
| No. | Title | Length |
|---|---|---|
| 1. | "Octopus" (released June 7, 2007) | 2:56 |
| 2. | "Re: Vos Cerveaux" (released November 29, 2007, re-recorded song in French of Re: Your Brains from Thing-a-Week Two) | 4:36 |
| 3. | "My Beige Bear" (released December 19, 2007) | 3:18 |
| 4. | "Lady Aberlin's Muumuu" (released February 12, 2008) | 2:15 |
| 5. | "Washy Ad Jeffy" (released June 13, 2008) | 2:02 |
| 6. | "Monkey Shines" (released May 29, 2008) | 0:51 |
| 7. | "Big Dick Farts a Polka" (released July 2, 2008) | 2:18 |
| 8. | "Space Doggity" (released July 25, 2008) | 3:26 |
| 9. | "Always the Moon" (released August 21, 2008) | 2:50 |
| 10. | "Blue Sunny Day" (released March 16, 2009) | 3:50 |
