= Thing a Week =

2006 series of studio albums by Jonathan Coulton

Thing a Week (sometimes as Thing-a-Week) is a series of albums released by the American musician Jonathan Coulton in 2006. He compiled these albums from his weekly podcast, in which he challenged himself to write, record, and produce a new song within a week, every week, for an entire year. He wanted to prove that he was capable of consistently meeting a deadline.

The folk rock series was recorded at Coulton's home in Brooklyn after he quit his computer programming job to spend more time with his wife and baby daughter. His podcast picked up many thousands of followers who praised the few novelty songs he posted before 2006, inspiring him to remake himself as an online musician.

After Thing a Week, Coulton wrote "Still Alive" for the video game Portal in 2007. He sang his songs in concert, and a 2008 performance was captured on video to become the 2009 DVD Best. Concert. Ever. Many of the songs came from the Thing a Week series.

== Thing a Week One ==
Thing a Week One

Studio album by Jonathan Coulton
- Released: August 31, 2006
- Recorded: 2006
- Genre: Folk rock, power pop
- Producer: Jonathan Coulton

Jonathan Coulton chronology
Our Bodies, Ourselves, Our Cybernetic Arms (2005)	Thing a Week One (2006)	Thing a Week Two (2006)

Thing a Week One is the first album of the series, and Coulton's fourth studio album. It contains a cover of Sir Mix-a-Lot's "Baby Got Back." AllMusic described the album as a collection of power pop songs, rock songs and ballads: "a mixed bag in form, content, and genre".

=== Track listing ===
All tracks written and composed by Jonathan Coulton unless noted.

No.	Title	Length
1.	"See You All in Hell"	0:58
2.	"My Monkey"	2:47
3.	"W's Duty"	1:49
4.	"Shop Vac"	3:31
5.	"Baby Got Back" (Mix-a-Lot, melody by Coulton)	5:33
6.	"Someone is Crazy"	2:04
7.	"Brand New Sucker"	2:07
8.	"Sibling Rivalry"	3:04
9.	"The Town Crotch"	4:44
10.	"Podsafe Christmas Song"	2:45
11.	"Furry Old Lobster"	2:02
12.	"Drive"	2:35

== Thing a Week Two ==
Thing a Week Two

Studio album by Jonathan Coulton
- Released: November 2, 2006
- Recorded: 2006
- Producer: Jonathan Coulton

Jonathan Coulton chronology
Thing a Week One (2006)	Thing a Week Two (2006)	Thing a Week Three (2006)

Thing a Week Two is the second Thing a Week album, and the fifth studio album by Jonathan Coulton. It includes "I Will," a cover of the Beatles' song from the White Album.

=== Track listing ===
All tracks written and composed by Jonathan Coulton unless noted.

No.	Title	Length
1.	"Flickr"	2:48
2.	"Resolutions"	2:21
3.	"You Could Be Her"	4:21
4.	"I Will" (Lennon–McCartney)	2:16
5.	"Dance, Soterios Johnson, Dance"	3:51
6.	"So Far So Good"	3:22
7.	"Curl"	3:18
8.	"Chiron Beta Prime"	2:51
9.	"Take Care of Me"	2:45
10.	"A Talk with George"	3:06
11.	"Don't Talk to Strangers" (Springfield)	3:09
12.	"Stroller Town"	2:47
13.	"Re: Your Brains"	4:31

== Thing a Week Three ==
Thing a Week Three

Studio album by Jonathan Coulton
- Released: December 15, 2006
- Recorded: 2006
- Producer: Jonathan Coulton

Jonathan Coulton chronology
Thing a Week Two (2006)	Thing a Week Three (2006)	Thing a Week Four (2006)

Thing a Week Three is the third Thing a Week album, and the sixth studio album by Jonathan Coulton. It contains "Code Monkey," used as the theme to the TV show and internet series, G4's Code Monkeys.

=== Track listing ===
All tracks written and composed by Jonathan Coulton unless noted.

No.	Title	Length
1.	"Madelaine"	3:43
2.	"When You Go"	3:53
3.	"Code Monkey"	3:07
4.	"The Presidents"	4:09
5.	"Just as Long as Me"	2:12
6.	"Till the Money Comes"	3:29
7.	"Tom Cruise Crazy"	3:41
8.	"Famous Blue Raincoat" (Cohen)	4:01
9.	"Soft Rocked by Me"	4:19
10.	"Not About You"	2:12
11.	"Rock and Roll Boy"	3:28
12.	"Drinking with You"	3:31
13.	"Pizza Day"	3:09

== Thing a Week Four ==
Thing a Week Four

Studio album by Jonathan Coulton
- Released: December 15, 2006
- Recorded: 2006
- Producer: Jonathan Coulton

Jonathan Coulton chronology
Thing a Week Three (2006)	Thing a Week Four (2006)	JoCo Looks Back (2008)

Thing a Week Four is the fourth and final Thing a Week album, and the seventh studio album by Coulton. It includes "Creepy Doll", a song in which a man buys an abandoned house and finds a living, creepy doll upstairs, and is killed by the doll in a fire. This song inspired a Magic: The Gathering card of the same name. Wishing for a "grandiose" ending, Coulton finished the series with two covers of Queen songs: "We Will Rock You", and "We Are the Champions".

=== Track listing ===
All tracks written and composed by Jonathan Coulton unless noted.

No.	Title	Length
1.	"SkyMall"	3:55
2.	"Seahorse"	3:28
3.	"Creepy Doll"	4:00
4.	"Under the Pines"	3:37
5.	"Big Bad World One"	2:50
6.	"Mr. Fancy Pants"	1:19
7.	"You Ruined Everything"	2:17
8.	"I'm Your Moon"	3:13
9.	"The Big Boom"	2:37
10.	"Make You Cry"	3:09
11.	"Pull the String"	2:30
12.	"Summer's Over"	2:54
13.	"We Will Rock You" (May)	1:54
14.	"We Are the Champions" (Mercury)	2:13
