= Artificial Heart (album) =

2011 studio album by Jonathan Coulton

Studio album by Jonathan Coulton
- Released: September 2, 2011
- Recorded: September 2010 – June 2011
- Genres: Folk rock, alternative rock, indie folk
- Label: Jocoserious Records
- Producer: John Flansburgh

Jonathan Coulton chronology
The Aftermath (2009)	Artificial Heart (2011)	Solid State (2017)

Artificial Heart is the eighth studio album by American rock musician Jonathan Coulton, released digitally on September 2, 2011 and physically on November 8, 2011. After taking a long hiatus from songwriting after his 2006 Thing a Week project (with the exceptions of "Still Alive" and ten songs recorded between 2007 and 2009), Coulton started production on Artificial Heart after encouragement from John Flansburgh of They Might Be Giants, also the album's producer. Unlike much of Coulton's previous work, Artificial Heart's original lyricism is largely non-comedic and contains few references to geek culture overall, instead opting for heavy themes of betrayal, commitment, abandonment, and surrender.

== History ==
The album began production after Coulton opened a few shows for They Might Be Giants in 2010. Sometime during these shows, John Flansburgh suggested to Coulton that he put together a band and record an album professionally, to be produced by Flansburgh. In 2010, Coulton announced that he was about to start recording his first album in four years.

Artificial Heart is a collaboration between Coulton and Flansburgh, who encouraged Coulton to step outside the independent realm of his previous work and try many new things for the album, including recording with a full band in a professional studio. Thus, Artificial Heart is the first Coulton album to be produced by someone other than Coulton himself, the first to be recorded in a studio (owned by Flansburgh's collaborator Patrick Dillett), and the first to be written for (and recorded by) a full band. Artificial Heart is also the first Coulton album to feature guest lead vocals and a duet.

Artificial Heart was Coulton's first album to chart, placing #1 on Billboard's Heatseekers Albums, #26 on Billboard's Rock Albums, #16 on Billboard's Alternative Albums, and #125 on the Billboard 200.

== Track listing ==
Lead vocals by Jonathan Coulton, unless otherwise noted.

No.	Title	Lead Vocal(s)	Length
1.	"Sticking It to Myself"		2:19
2.	"Artificial Heart"		2:33
3.	"Nemeses"	John Roderick	3:01
4.	"The World Belongs to You"		2:11
5.	"Today with Your Wife"		2:57
6.	"Sucker Punch"		1:42
7.	"Glasses"		2:47
8.	"Je Suis Rick Springfield"		2:28
9.	"Alone at Home"		2:02
10.	"Fraud"		3:00
11.	"Good Morning Tucson"		2:27
12.	"Now I Am an Arsonist"	Jonathan Coulton, Suzanne Vega	2:53
13.	"Down Today"		2:22
14.	"Dissolve"		2:58
15.	"Nobody Loves You Like Me"		2:19
16.	"Still Alive"	Sara Quin	4:15
17.	"Want You Gone"		2:22
18.	"The Stache"		3:00

== Personnel ==
- Jonathan Coulton – vocals, guitar, ukulele, other instruments
- Chris Anderson – bass
- Marty Beller – drums
- Mauro Refosco – percussion
- Joe McGinty – keyboards
- Jon Spurney – keyboards
- Suzanne Vega – vocals on "Now I Am an Arsonist"
- Sara Quin – vocals on "Still Alive"
- John Roderick – vocals on "Nemeses"
- Dorit Chrysler – theremin on "Still Alive"
- Stan Harrison – saxophone arrangement and performance on "Sticking It to Myself"

== Availability ==
The album was released on September 2, 2011. The initial release is available as part of a "premium superfan pack" with extra merchandise, including a vinyl pressing and T-shirts, designed by Sam Potts.

The first track to be released from the album, Nemeses, was released online via Paste Magazine on July 28, 2011.
