= Best. Concert. Ever. =

Live album by Jonathan Coulton
- Released: 2009
- Recorded: February 22, 2008
- Venue: Great American Music Hall, San Francisco, California
- Genre: Folk rock, powerpop
- Producer: Jonathan Coulton

Jonathan Coulton chronology
JoCo Looks Back (2006)	Best. Concert. Ever. (2009)	The Aftermath (2009)

Best. Concert. Ever. is a live concert CD/DVD by internet musician Jonathan Coulton. It was recorded live on February 22, 2008 at the Great American Music Hall in San Francisco, California.

The DVD features: Paul and Storm, Kristen Shirts on ukulele, Andy "The Human Keyboard" Bates on vocals, and Coulton on guitar and zendrum. Also included are documentary and interview segments, audio commentary, bonus material, and footage shot by fans on consumer-grade cameras.

== Credits ==
- Executive producers: Christine Connor and Jonathan Coulton;
- Produced, directed and photographed by: Adam Feinstein and Jeremiah Crowell at Lucas Blank;
- Edited by: Christopher K. Dillon;
- Featuring: Paul Sabourin, Storm Costanza, Kristen Shirts, Merlin Mann, Veronica Belmont, Leo Laporte, and Andy Bates;
- Code Monkey dance and video by: Emily Mark;
- Audio recorded by: Paul Tumulo of Wildplum Recordings;
- Post production audio mix by: Devin Eke at Park Avenue Post;
- Package design by: Elizabeth Connor

== Track listing ==
No.	Title	Length
1.	"The Future Soon"	3:41
2.	"Ikea"	3:06
3.	"Shop Vac"	3:25
4.	"I'm Your Moon"	3:20
5.	"Baby Got Back"	3:25
6.	"Kenesaw Mountain Landis"	3:41
7.	"Chiron Beta Prime"	3:30
8.	"Tom Cruise Crazy"	4:12
9.	"Code Monkey"	4:00
10.	"Creepy Doll"	4:53
11.	"Still Alive"	3:04
12.	"Mr. Fancy Pants"	3:24
13.	"I Crush Everything"	4:17
14.	"Skullcrusher Mountain"	4:11
15.	"Mandelbrot Set"	3:37
16.	"You Ruined Everything"	2:26
17.	"Re: Your Brains"	3:55
18.	"A Talk with George"	3:17
19.	"I Feel Fantastic"	3:04
20.	"First of May"	4:20
