= JoCo Looks Back =

Compilation album by Jonathan Coulton
- Released: October 22, 2008
- Recorded: 2002–2006
- Genres: Folk rock, power pop, geek rock, comedy
- Length: 1:11:29
- Label: Jonathan Coulton
- Producer: Jonathan Coulton

Jonathan Coulton chronology
Thing a Week Four (2006)	JoCo Looks Back (2008)	Best. Concert. Ever. (2009)

JoCo Looks Back is a compilation album by American internet comedy musician Jonathan Coulton. The title comes from Coulton's nickname, JoCo. It is his first 'greatest hits' compilation and his first of three compilation albums, the others being the live concert recording Best. Concert. Ever and Jonathan Coulton's Greatest Hit (Plus 13 Other Songs), a compilation created for the Humble Music Bundle. The album features 20 previously released tracks from Coulton's first four studio albums, plus the two EPs Our Bodies, Ourselves, Our Cybernetic Arms and Where Tradition Meets Tomorrow. The album was released on October 22, 2008.

"Code Monkey" was accidentally released in mono on the previous album Thing a Week Three. It was properly released in stereo for this compilation by Jonathan Coulton. All other songs on the CD are the same as on previous releases. Like most of Coulton's music, the songs are protected under the Creative Commons license.

== Track listing ==
All tracks are written by Jonathan Coulton, except "Baby Got Back," originally by Sir Mix-a-Lot.

No.	Title	Original Album	Length
1.	"Code Monkey"	Thing a Week Three, 2006	3:10
2.	"Ikea"	Smoking Monkey, 2003	3:04
3.	"I Feel Fantastic"	Our Bodies, Ourselves, Our Cybernetic Arms, 2005	3:05
4.	"Mandelbrot Set"	Where Tradition Meets Tomorrow, 2004	4:22
5.	"Tom Cruise Crazy"	Thing a Week Three	3:41
6.	"Shop Vac"	Thing a Week One, 2006	3:31
7.	"Chiron Beta Prime"	Thing a Week Two, 2006	2:51
8.	"I'm Your Moon"	Thing a Week Four, 2006	3:14
9.	"My Monkey"	Thing a Week One	2:46
10.	"Skullcrusher Mountain"	Where Tradition Meets Tomorrow	4:19
11.	"I Crush Everything"	Where Tradition Meets Tomorrow	4:45
12.	"When You Go"	Thing a Week Three	3:52
13.	"A Talk with George"	Thing a Week Two	3:05
14.	"You Ruined Everything"	Thing a Week Four	2:18
15.	"Creepy Doll"	Thing a Week Four	4:01
16.	"Mr. Fancy Pants"	Thing a Week Four	1:20
17.	"Baby Got Back"	Thing a Week One	5:32
18.	"First of May"	Smoking Monkey	4:11
19.	"Re: Your Brains"	Thing a Week Two	4:32
20.	"The Future Soon"	Where Tradition Meets Tomorrow	3:50
Total length:			1:11:29

== Background ==
The album was recorded from 2002 - 2006 in Coulton's hometown of Brooklyn, New York. Most of the songs on it are about intentionally random or lighthearted topics, but some, like A Talk With George or You Ruined Everything, are more serious with their sound and message.

According to Coulton, he had the idea of "Mr. Fancy Pants" rattling around in his head for a while, but rarely performed the song live since it has no real ending and, as he said himself, doesn’t make sense. History was made on September 14, 2007 when Coulton used his newly-purchased Zendrum to remix the song live as a solo in the middle of other songs.

== Personnel ==
All instruments are played by Jonathan Coulton.
