= Solid State (Jonathan Coulton album) =

Studio album by Jonathan Coulton
- Released: April 28, 2017
- Genre: Alternative, rock
- Length: 53:08
- Label: SuperEgo
- Producer: Christian Cassan

Jonathan Coulton chronology
Artificial Heart (2011)	Solid State (2017)	Some Guys (2019)

Singles from Solid State
- 1. "All This Time" Released: February 28, 2017

Professional ratings
Review scores
Source	Rating
AllMusic	4/5 stars

Solid State is the ninth studio album by singer-songwriter Jonathan Coulton. It was released on April 28, 2017. Coulton describes it as "a concept album about the internet, trolls, artificial intelligence, and how love and empathy will save humanity!" Coulton says that the album "has a bit of a concept behind it," with a "character that you follow throughout his life."

== Recording ==
The album was recorded, mixed and produced by Christian Cassan at the Secret Garden recording studio in Brooklyn, New York.

The album features additional vocals from Aimee Mann on several songs, including "All This Time," as well as guest guitar work from Dave Gregory on two tracks.

== Release ==
The album was released on April 28, available as digital download, on double vinyl and CD. The album's first single, "All This Time", was released on February 28.

== Graphic novel ==
On April 28, along with the album itself, Coulton released a graphic novel, written by Matt Fraction and illustrated by Albert Monteys. The graphic novel is meant to follow the same story as the album, but further fleshed out.

== Live performances ==
The album premiered on the 2015 JoCo Cruise, when Coulton played early recordings of the songs "All This Time" and "Don't Feed the Trolls".

On the 2016 Cruise, Coulton played "Brave", "Square Things", "All This Time" and "Your Tattoo", all live, with fellow singer-songwriter and friend Aimee Mann.

On the 2017 Cruise, Coulton performed two more songs for the first time, "Pictures of Cats" and "Ordinary Man". This was also the first time he played "Don't Feed the Trolls" live, as he only played a recording during 2015.

In addition, he performed songs from Solid State as part of his opening act for Aimee Mann's 2017–‘18 tours for her album Mental Illness for which he had co-written three songs in addition to providing backing vocals and instrumentation. Advance copies of the album were available on both vinyl and CD during the main 2017 tour, along with the accompanying graphic novel and T-shirts.

== Track listing ==
No.	Title	Length
1.	"Wake Up"	4:26
2.	"All This Time"	4:08
3.	"Solid State"	2:53
4.	"Brave"	2:57
5.	"Square Things"	3:10
6.	"Pictures of Cats"	2:48
7.	"Ordinary Man"	3:50
8.	"Robots.Txt"	3:15
9.	"Don't Feed the Trolls"	3:10
10.	"Your Tattoo"	2:42
11.	"Ball and Chain"	3:22
12.	"Sunshine"	4:39
13.	"Solid State (Reprise)"	2:35
14.	"Pulled Down the Stars"	2:54
15.	"All to Myself (Pt 1)"	2:04
16.	"All to Myself (Pt 2)"	2:24
17.	"There You Are"	1:41
Total length:		53:08
