= Music of Portal 2 =

Soundtrack and related music of the video game Portal 2

Portal 2 is a physics-based puzzle-platform game created by Valve and released on Microsoft Windows, Mac OS X, PlayStation 3, Xbox 360 and Linux in April 2011, followed by a Nintendo Switch version in June 2022. The game, set in the desolate, labyrinthine Aperture Science facility, challenges the player to navigate test chambers created by the artificial intelligence GLaDOS, using a portal gun, a device that creates portals linking two points in space like a wormhole. The game expands on the original Portal by adding new puzzle elements, such as paint that imparts properties to surfaces, plates that can launch the player and objects over distances, tractor beams, and bridges made of light.

The game's music includes a score composed by Valve's Mike Morasky and two original songs provided by Jonathan Coulton and the band The National. The bulk of the music was released as a freely available download in three volumes entitled Songs to Test By, and later in a four-disc retail Collector's edition that also included music from Portal.

== "Want You Gone" ==
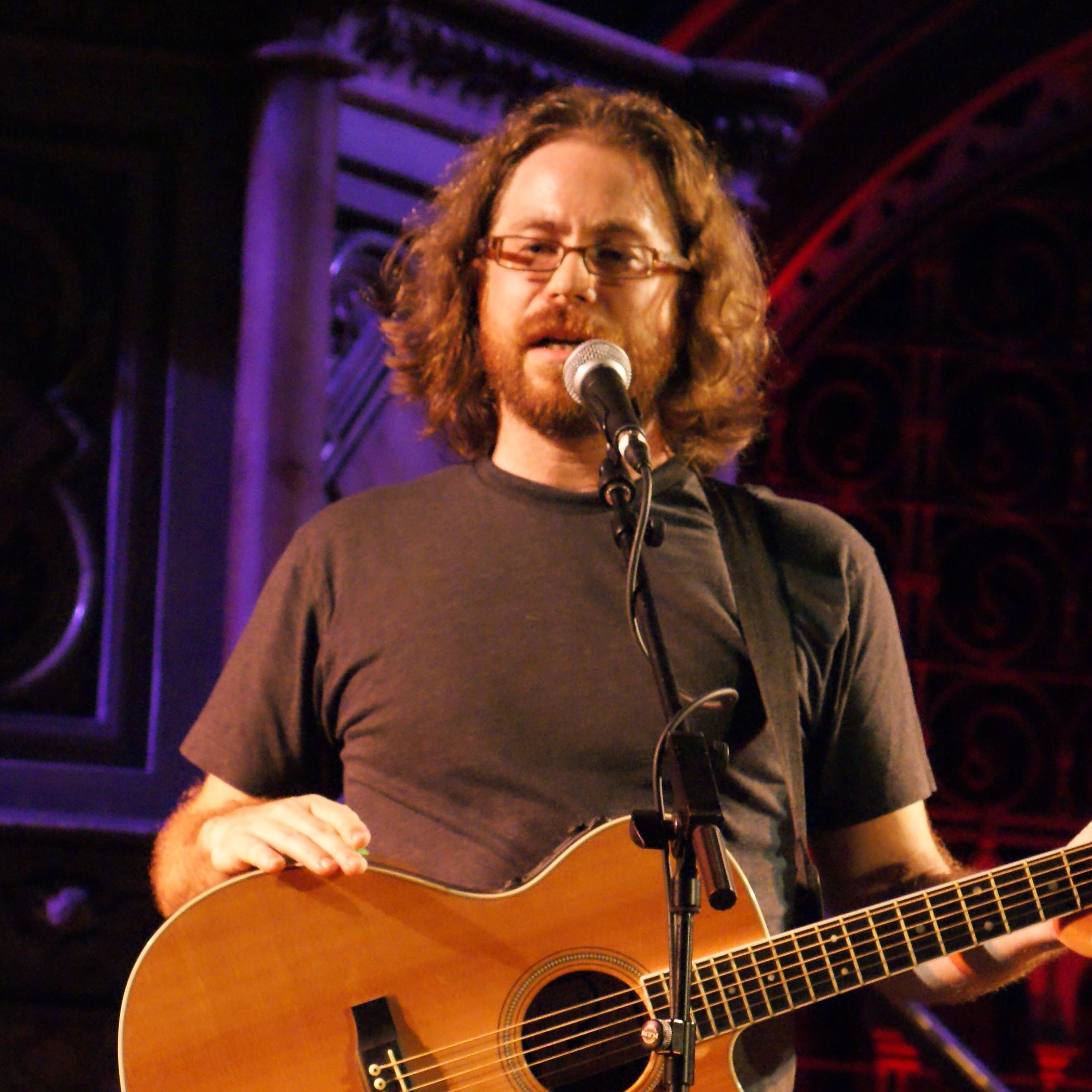
Jonathan Coulton, who provided the song "Still Alive" for the first Portal, was asked to compose Portal 2's final credits song, "Want You Gone".

Part of Portal's success was attributed to Jonathan Coulton's song "Still Alive", sung by GLaDOS (voiced by Ellen McLain) over the game's end credits. Consequently, Valve sought to incorporate more music in Portal 2, particularly from Coulton. In 2009, before Portal 2's ending was written, Coulton and Erik Wolpaw talked about how to create "an emotional moment" comparable to "Still Alive", and debated whether an ending song would be necessary. Other options were considered, such as several "joke songs" and false endings for the game. The game's finale, where GLaDOS effectively "breaks up" with Chell, was set by the last quarter of 2010; Coulton played the game as it had been developed to that point to generate ideas. He ultimately wrote a song for the game's ending credits, "Want You Gone", also written from GLaDOS's viewpoint. Elements of the ending, such as Chell being told to leave Aperture with the door slamming behind her, led to the development of main chorus line "I used to want you dead, but now I only want you gone." Coulton wrote the lyrics and composed the song over several days, with John Flansburgh contributing electronic drums, and traveled to Valve's headquarters in January 2011 to record it with McLain.

The song was included on the Portal 2 soundtrack. Another version of "Want You Gone", sung by Coulton, appears on his 2011 album Artificial Heart.

== "Exile Vilify" ==
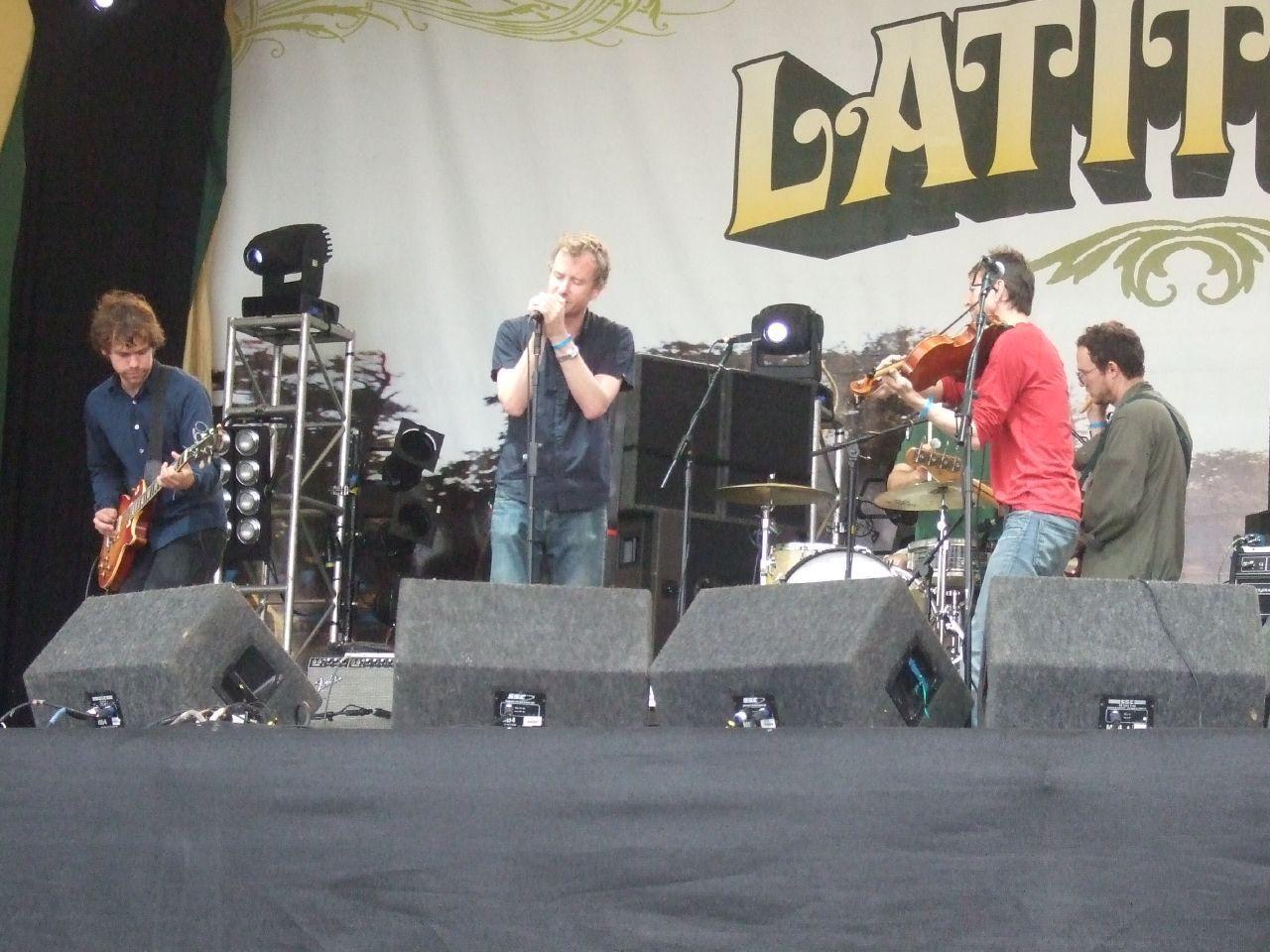
The band The National worked with Valve to create "Exile Vilify" used in conjunction with one of the dens of the Rat Man within the game.

The indie rock band The National provided another original song, "Exile Vilify"; its lyrics were composed by the group and reviewed by Valve to ensure they fit with the tone of one of the Rattmann's dens, where it appears in-game. The National had expressed an interest in doing music for Valve to Bug Music, their publishing label, which the label forwarded on to Valve in discussing other music opportunities for the game. Valve and Bug Music identified that The National would fit well into Portal 2, as their "raw and emotive music evokes the same visceral reactions from its listeners that Portal does from its players" according to Bug Music's spokesperson Julia Betley. The song is considered by Paste to be a "haunted, piano-lead ballad" similar to the band's song "Think You Can Wait" used in the film Win Win. "Exile Vilify" is not included in the freely downloadable Portal 2 soundtrack, but instead was released as a digital single by the band.

After the game's release, Valve and The National ran a contest encouraging users to create their own music video for "Exile Vilify", offering as prizes Valve merchandise and a guitar signed by members of the band. Of 320 videos submitted, Valve ultimately awarded two videos first prize. One video featured a sock puppet that "had nothing to do with Portal" but "managed to beautifully capture the spirit of the song", while the other provided an animated retelling of the Lab Rat comic.

== Original music ==
Valve's Mike Morasky was the lead composer for the game's backing music. In keeping with the theme from Portal, Morasky wanted to create music that kept an "old future through a new lens" approach, such as by using minimalist electronic piano or mangled chiptunes. He also wanted to create music that would sound like it would have been composed by a computer, citing the use of "stiff arpeggios, math-like voice leading, odd rhythm patterns and whole tone scales" as a means to achieve this. Morasky also incorporated the briefly-seen singing turrets—all voiced by McLain— in the piece "Cara Mia Addio!" after recalling that she was a former opera singer, and used snippets of her singing to create something that still sounded synthetic. Except for McLain's vocals, all the music is based on synthesized or sampled sounds, and even with McLain, her voice was resampled to make it sound like a computer. McLain wrote "GLaDOS' Song" (possibly better known as "Don't Say Goodbye") from the character's point of view, showing GLaDOS' more sentimental connection to Chell. She intended it to be an Easter egg, though it was not used in the game. Jagger Gravning of Vice later had her record the song with her husband John Patrick Lowrie, and Lowrie uploaded it to YouTube in 2015.

Morasky created procedurally generated music, which is generated in real time based on the player's actions. This type of music system was based on the previous success of incidental music used in the Left 4 Dead series, and was developed to create a generalized platform for reuse in future Valve productions. Such music is generated by the player's interaction with various puzzle objects in the test chambers, such as launching from an Aerial Faith Plate. Morasky designed the procedure to build out the music more as the player completed more of each puzzle. Morasky also saw this as a means to provide experimentation to the player, exploring both space and timing of events to alter the composition of the music. Morasky claims that one piece of music "only repeats itself every 76,911 years, 125 days, 7 hours, 56 minutes and 30.3 seconds". Morasky designed this dynamic music as a reward for successfully completing puzzles.

== Songs to Test By ==
Portal 2 Soundtrack: Songs to Test By

Soundtrack album by Aperture Science Psychoacoustics Laboratory (Mike Morasky)
- Released: Volume 1: May 25, 2011; Volume 2: July 1, 2011; Volume 3: September 30, 2011
- Genres: Dark ambient, glitch, IDM, electro-industrial, neoclassical orchestra
- Length: Volume 1: 73:39; Volume 2: 62:13; Volume 3: 65:54
- Label: Ipecac

Songs to Test By is the three-to-four-volume soundtrack for Portal 2, containing nearly all of the music from the game. The soundtrack was released freely to the Internet, volume by volume, between May and September 2011. Along with the soundtrack, Valve included several Portal 2-themed ringtones.

=== Soundtrack listing ===
All tracks are written by Mike Morasky unless otherwise noted.

Portal 2 Soundtrack: Songs to Test By – Volume 1
No.	Title	Length
1.	"Science Is Fun"	2:33
2.	"Concentration Enhancing Menu Initialiser"	2:17
3.	"9999999"	3:11
4.	"The Courtesy Call"	3:37
5.	"Technical Difficulties"	3:22
6.	"Overgrowth"	2:51
7.	"Ghost of Rattman"	4:06
8.	"Haunted Panels"	1:36
9.	"The Future Starts with You"	3:22
10.	"There She Is"	4:21
11.	"You Know Her?"	3:11
12.	"The Friendly Faith Plate"	2:59
13.	"15 Acres of Broken Glass"	5:00
14.	"Love as a Construct"	4:57
15.	"I Saw a Deer Today"	3:13
16.	"Hard Sunshine"	2:48
17.	"I'm Different"	4:29
18.	"Adrenal Vapor"	2:36
19.	"Turret Wife Serenade"	1:39
20.	"I Made It All Up"	3:56
21.	"Comedy = Tragedy + Time"	3:30
22.	"Triple Laser Phase"	4:15
Total length:		73:39

Portal 2 Soundtrack: Songs to Test By – Volume 2
No.	Title	Length
1.	"You Will Be Perfect"	2:40
2.	"Halls of Science 4"	4:35
3.	"(defun botsbuildbots () (botsbuildbots))"	4:07
4.	"An Accent Beyond"	2:58
5.	"Robot Ghost Story"	3:07
6.	"Die Cut Laser Dance"	2:00
7.	"Turret Redemption Line"	3:23
8.	"Bring Your Daughter to Work Day"	2:40
9.	"Almost at Fifty Percent"	1:59
10.	"Don't Do It"	5:16
11.	"I AM NOT A MORON!"	3:47
12.	"Vitrification Order"	6:34
13.	"Music of the Spheres"	3:39
14.	"You Are Not Part of the Control Group"	3:24
15.	"Forwarding the Cause of Science"	3:41
16.	"PotatOS Lament"	1:59
17.	"The Reunion"	3:46
18.	"Music of the Spheres 2 (Incendiary Lemons)"	2:44
Total length:		62:13

Portal 2 Soundtrack: Songs to Test By – Volume 3
No.	Title	Writer(s)	Length
1.	"Reconstructing More Science"		2:36
2.	"Wheatley Science"		2:29
3.	"FrankenTurrets"		4:08
4.	"Machiavellian Bach"		4:01
5.	"Excursion Funnel"		4:32
6.	"TEST"		6:14
7.	"The Part Where He Kills You"		3:23
8.	"Omg, What Has He Done?"		2:24
9.	"Bombs for Throwing at You"		5:48
10.	"Your Precious Moon"		1:55
11.	"Caroline Deleted"		1:50
12.	"Cara Mia Addio"		2:33
13.	"Want You Gone"	Jonathan Coulton	2:21
14.	"Spaaaaace"		0:45
15.	"Space Phase"		1:32
16.	"Some Assembly Required"		1:50
17.	"Robot Waiting Room #1"		2:14
18.	"Robot Waiting Room #2"		2:14
19.	"Robot Waiting Room #3"		2:14
20.	"Robot Waiting Room #4"		2:14
21.	"Robot Waiting Room #5"		2:14
22.	"Robot Waiting Room #6"		2:06
23.	"You Saved Science"		0:47
24.	"Robots FTW"		3:38
25.	"Still Alive (Radio Mix)"		0:45
26.	"Still Alive (Radio Mix Clean)"		0:45
Total length:			67:25

A retail four-disc collection, Portal 2: Songs to Test By (Collector's Edition), was released on October 30, 2012 through Ipecac Recordings. Three of the discs include the music already available (listed above), while the fourth disc includes songs from Portal. A mini-comic, "Turret Lullaby", is also included.

Portal 2 Soundtrack: Songs to Test By (Collector's Edition) – Bonus Disc
No.	Title	Writer(s)	Length
1.	"Subject Name Here"	Kelly Bailey	1:45
2.	"Taste of Blood"	Kelly Bailey	3:06
3.	"Android Hell"	Kelly Bailey	3:46
4.	"Self Esteem Fund"	Kelly Bailey	3:31
5.	"Procedural Jiggle Bone"	Kelly Bailey	4:35
6.	"No Cake for You"	Mike Morasky	4:05
7.	"4000 Degrees Kelvin"	Kelly Bailey	1:02
8.	"Stop What You Are Doing"	Mike Morasky	4:00
9.	"Party Escort"	Mike Morasky	4:22
10.	"Your [sic] Not a Good Person" / "You're Not a Good Person"	Mike Morasky	1:25
11.	"You Can't Escape You Know"	Mike Morasky	6:24
12.	"Still Alive"	Jonathan Coulton	2:56
13.	"Still Alive" (J.C. Mix)	Jonathan Coulton	2:57

== Reception ==
Kym Dillon of IGN used the soundtrack of Portal 2, amongst a few other soundtracks, as an example how a game can use both source music (music that is part of the game environment) and underscoring (music that is only for the player) to create atmosphere in games; Dillon also mentions that he "especially" liked the game's soundtrack. Alyssa Grimley of the Seattle Post-Intelligencer praised Morasky's composing of the soundtrack and called it an "understated genius". She also praised Jonathan Coulton's song "Want You Gone" for the way in which it reflects the changed spirit of GLaDOS when compared to "Still Alive" from the first game. Kirk Hamilton of Kotaku listed Portal 2 as possessing one of the best musical scores in video games for 2011, praising both the composed songs and the dynamically-generated elements.

For the 2011 Spike Video Game Awards, both "Want You Gone" and "Exile Vilify" were nominated for "Best Song in a Game", while the soundtrack was nominated for "Best Original Score". Portal 2's soundtrack was awarded for "Outstanding Achievement in Original Music Composition" at the 15th Annual Interactive Achievement Awards. The game was awarded the "Best Audio" 2012 Game Developers Choice Awards. The Game Audio Network Guild awarded Portal 2 with the "Best Interactive Score" (along with Kinect Disneyland Adventures), and "Best Original Vocal - Pop" for "Want You Gone".
