= Ellen McLain =

American voice actress (born 1952 or 1953)

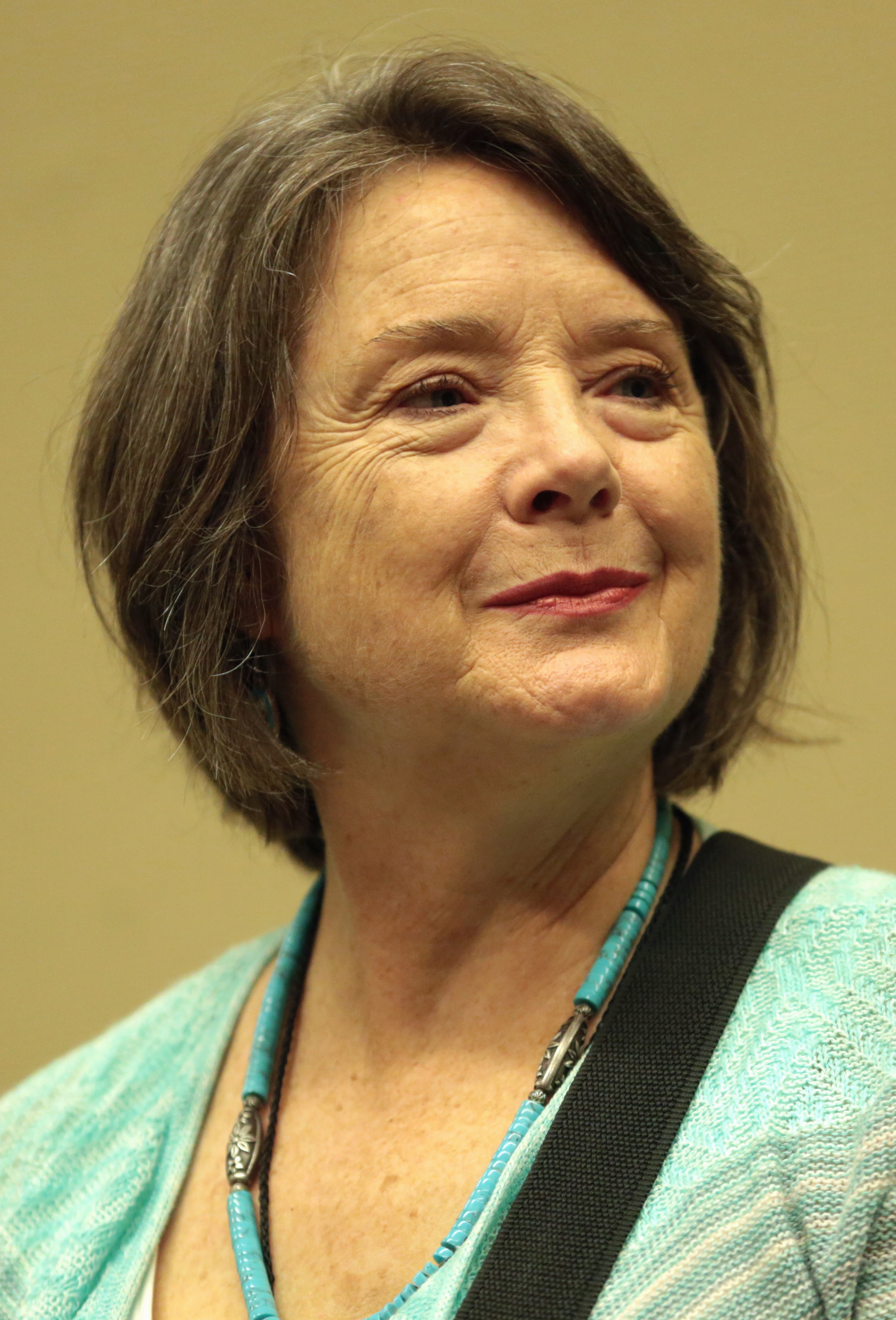
- McLain at the 2017 Game On Expo
- Born: 1952 or 1953 (age 73–74); Nashville, Tennessee, U.S.
- Occupation: Voice actress
- Years active: 2004–present
- Spouse: John Patrick Lowrie (m. 1986)
- Website: ellenmclain.net

Ellen McLain (born 1952 or 1953) is an American voice actress. She is best known for providing the voice of GLaDOS, the primary antagonist of the Portal video game series, the Combine Overwatch AI in Half-Life 2, and the Administrator, the announcer in Team Fortress 2. Her voice roles also include the Jaeger A.I. in Pacific Rim and The Witch in Left 4 Dead 2.

== Career ==
McLain provides voices for many characters in several video games from Valve. Among them are GLaDOS, the primary antagonist of the Portal video game series (for which she won an AIAS Interactive Achievement Award for Outstanding Achievement in Character Performance), the announcer in Team Fortress 2, and the voice of the Combine Overwatch for the Half-Life series.

McLain sang "Still Alive" and "Want You Gone", the ending credits songs to Portal and Portal 2, respectively, both of which were written by Jonathan Coulton. She also sang "Cara Mia Addio" at the end of Portal 2. In December 2011, McLain won the Spike Video Game Award in the category "Best Performance by a Human Female" for her voice acting as GLaDOS in Portal 2.

In 2013, she lent her public support to gathering donations for the Kickstarter-funded LGBT gaming convention GaymerX. She later was a special guest at the convention in August 2013. In 2014, she portrayed Fairy Godmother in the online video series [Wish It Inc.]. In 2015, she portrayed Lisa Clarke in the gay independent film, Winning Dad. This film was also promoted on McLain's YouTube channel.

McLain has played roles in many radio dramas on the radio program Imagination Theatre.

In 2021, McLain provided the voice of GLaDOS non-canonically, singing a verse in The Chalkeaters’ song "Count to Three" as a cameo.

Also in 2021, McLain performed the role of Thelma (or Mama) in a livestreamed version of the play 'night, Mother co-starring Sheila Houlahan on the online platform Twitch with the story adapted by McLain within the context of the COVID-19 pandemic. The filmed online play, directed by McLain's husband John Patrick Lowrie, is performed through an online face-to-face chat with the screen split between McLain's and Houlahan's screens, occasionally interrupted by cuts to pre-filmed footage relevant to the story.

In 2022, McLain provided the voice of GLaDOS for the GEICO insurance ad.

== Personal life ==
McLain has been married to fellow voice actor John Patrick Lowrie since 1986. McLain now spends her days as a voice instructor, teaching at local community and children's theaters.

== Filmography ==
=== Film ===
Year	Title	Role(s)	Notes
2013	Pacific Rim	Gipsy Danger AI	
2014	Winning Dad	Lisa Clarke	
2017	The Gamers: The Shadow Menace	Lorraine Richards	
2018	Pacific Rim: Uprising	Gipsy Avenger AI	
2025	Goos'd	Anti-Goosinator AI	Short animated thesis film

=== Web series ===
Year	Title	Role(s)	Notes
2014	IRrelevant Astronomy	NOTGLaDOS	"Fusion vs. Fission"
2014	Wish It Inc.	The Fairy Godmother	12 episodes
2016	Bee and PuppyCat	TempBot / Barkeep	"Game"
2017	Electromagnetic Spectrum: The Musical	NOTGLaDOS	
2021	Count to Three	GLaDOS	Music video by The Chalkeaters
2021	Night, Mother	Thelma / Mama	Livestreamed adaptation of the play 'night, Mother on Twitch.

=== Video games ===
Year	Title	Role(s)	Notes
2004	Half-Life 2	Combine Overwatch Announcer	
2006	Half-Life 2: Episode One	Combine Overwatch Announcer	
2007	Half-Life 2: Episode Two	Combine Overwatch Announcer	
2007	Portal	GLaDOS / Turrets / Curiosity Core / Intelligence Core (Cake Core)	AIAS Interactive Achievement Award for Outstanding Achievement in Character Performance; Sings "Still Alive"; Uncredited as "Curiosity Core" and "Cake Core"; See also: Portal reception and Reception and analysis of GLaDOS
2007	Team Fortress 2	The Administrator	Also referred to as "The Announcer" or "Helen"
2009	Left 4 Dead 2	The Witch	"Wandering Witch" daytime-only soundtrack singing
2011	Portal 2	GLaDOS / Turrets / Caroline	Best Performance by a Human Female at the Spike Video Game Awards Sings "Want You Gone" and "Cara Mia Addio"; Uncredited as "Caroline"
2011	Killing Floor	Anger Core	As a temporary trader during the games 2011 Potato Fools Day event.
2011	Defense Grid: The Awakening	GLaDOS	"You Monster" DLC
2012	Dota 2	Broodmother / Death Prophet / GLaDOS Announcer	
2013	Poker Night 2	GLaDOS	As the game's card dealer, supporting role
2015	Lego Dimensions	GLaDOS / Turrets / Cake Core	Supporting role Sings "You Wouldn't Know"
2017	Bridge Constructor Portal	GLaDOS	
2019	The Church in the Darkness	Rebecca Walker	
2020	Half-Life: Alyx	Combine Overwatch	
2020	Cyberpunk 2077	Delamain	As one of Delamain's split personalities, which is modeled after GLaDOS
