= Jonathan Coulton =

American singer-songwriter (born 1970)

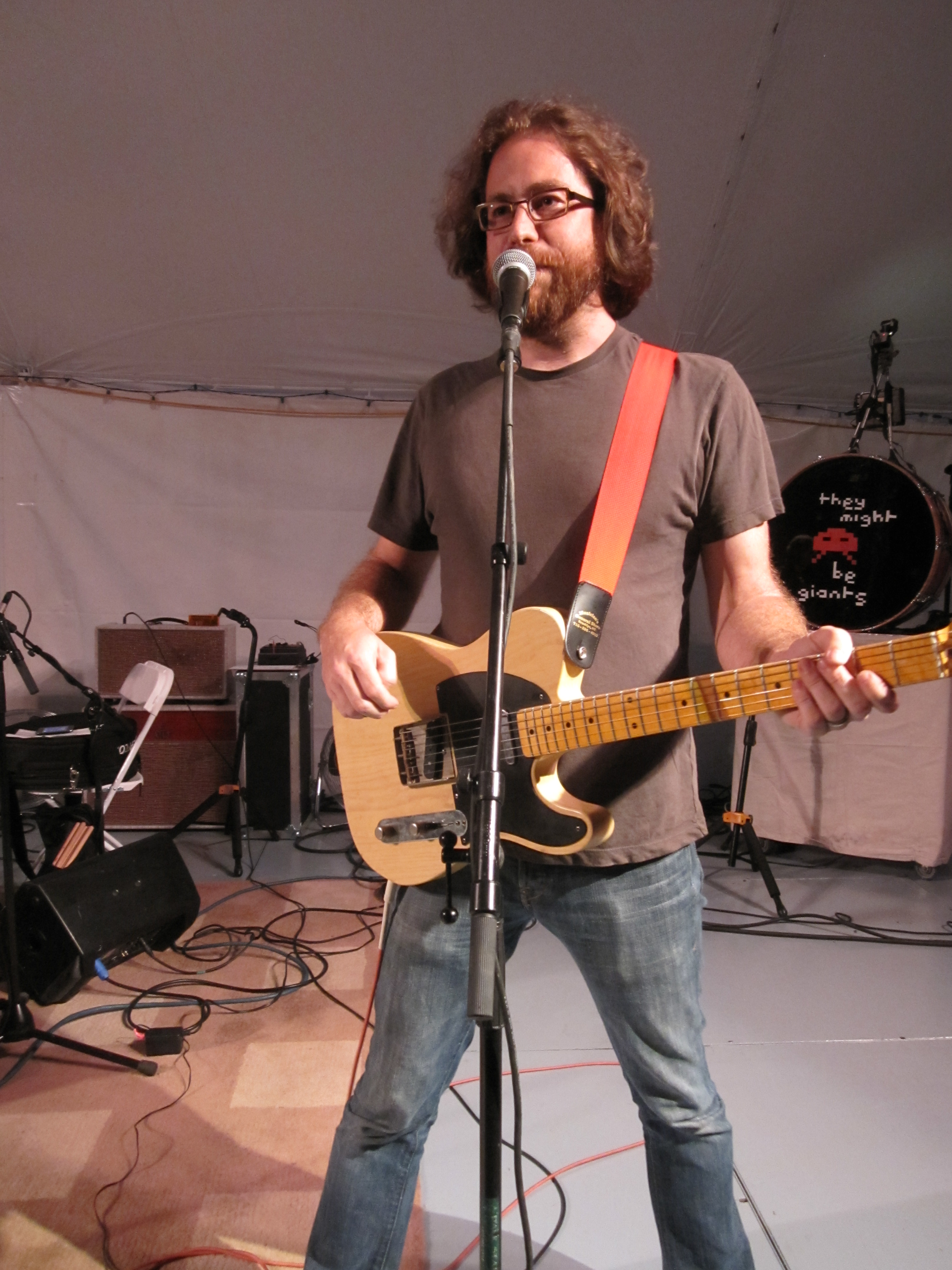
- Coulton in 2011

Background information
- Also known as: JoCo
- Born: December 1, 1970 (age 55)
- Origin: Colchester, Connecticut, U.S.
- Genres: Folk rock; indie rock; art rock; alternative rock; geek rock; comedy rock; nerd folk
- Occupations: Singer-songwriter; radio musician; in-house musician
- Instruments: Vocals; guitar; bass; drums; banjo; ukulele; zendrum; accordion; harmonica; mandolin; glockenspiel; analog synthesizers
- Years active: 2003–present
- Website: jonathancoulton.com

Jonathan William Coulton (born December 1, 1970), often called "JoCo" by fans, is an American folk/comedy singer-songwriter, known for his songs about geek culture and his use of the Internet to draw fans. Among his most popular songs are "Code Monkey", "Re: Your Brains", "Still Alive", and "Want You Gone" (the last three being featured in games developed by Valve: Left 4 Dead 2, Portal, and Portal 2 respectively). He was the house musician for NPR weekly puzzle quiz show Ask Me Another from 2012 until its end in 2021.

His album Artificial Heart was his first to chart, eventually reaching No. 1 on Billboard's Top Heatseekers and No. 125 in the Billboard 200.

== Career ==
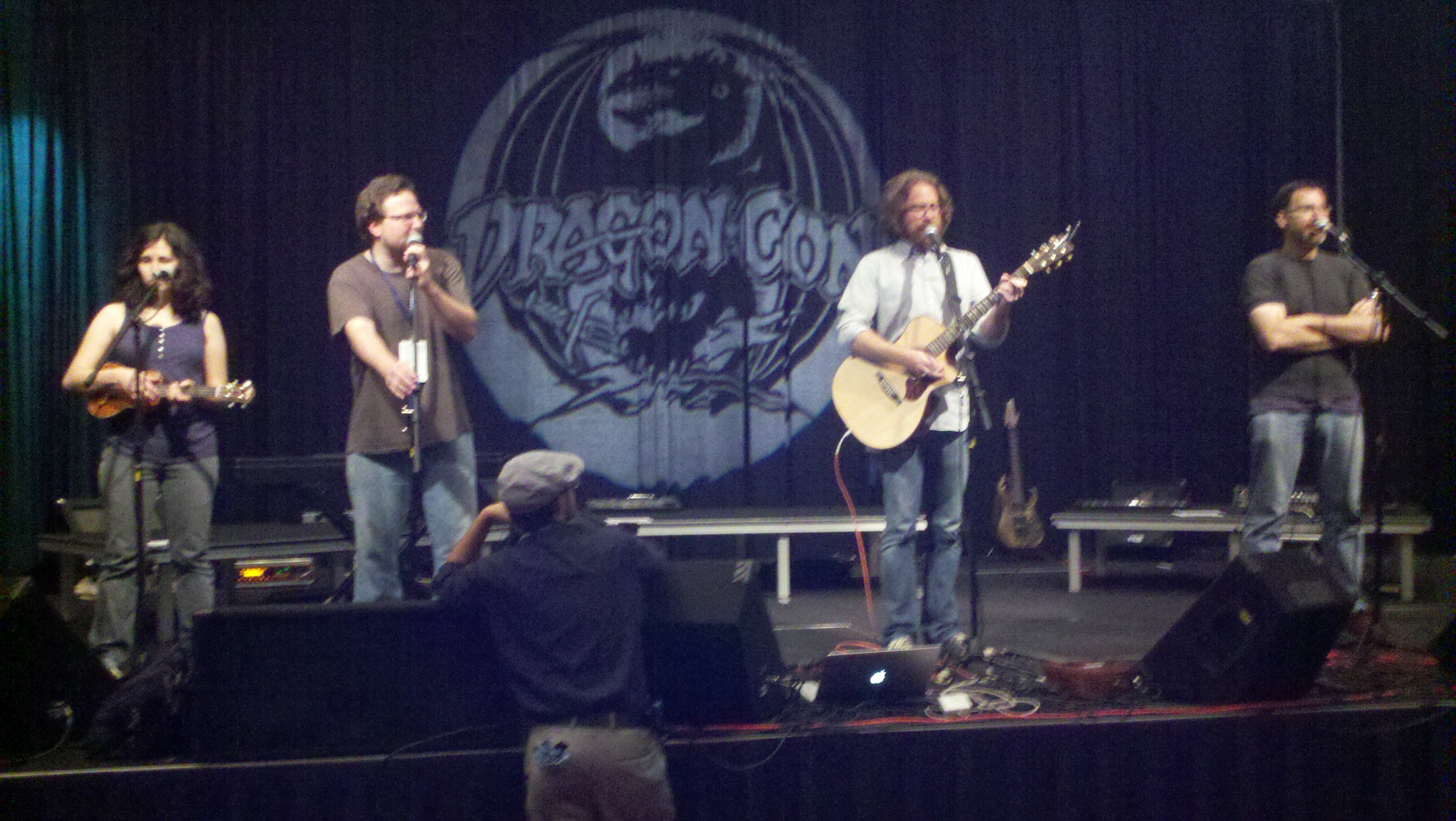
Coulton, Paul and Storm, and Molly Lewis performing at Dragon*Con 2011

Coulton's music tends to fit a folk rock style, with elements of pop and indie rock.

=== Early career and geek culture (1990s–2005) ===
Coulton graduated in 1993 from Yale, where he was a member of The Spizzwinks and the Yale Whiffenpoofs. In the 1990s, Coulton was in a short-lived band, named SuperGroup, with television producer Eric Salat and best-selling author Darin Strauss. A former computer programmer employed at Cluen, a New York City software company, and self-described geek, Coulton tended to write quirky, witty lyrics about science fiction and technology. Most of Coulton's recordings feature his singing over guitar, bass, and drums; some also feature the various other instruments Coulton plays, including accordion, harmonica, mandolin, banjo, ukulele, zendrum and glockenspiel.

Coulton's debut album, Smoking Monkey, was released in November 2003.

Several early podcasters discovered and made regular use of Coulton's music, notably Adam Curry of the Daily Source Code and The Wizards of Technology. In April 2006, he lent his voice to one such podcast, The Spoilers, in which he and hosts Rick Yaeger and Bill Douthett provided a 2-hour fan commentary for Raiders of the Lost Ark.

He was the Contributing Troubadour at Popular Science magazine, whose September 2005 issue was accompanied by a five-song set by Coulton called Our Bodies, Ourselves, Our Cybernetic Arms. He hosted the weekly "PopSci Podcast from the Moon". He was also the musical director for The Little Gray Book Lectures.

=== Thing a Week albums (2005–2006) ===
From September 16, 2005, to September 30, 2006, Coulton ran "Thing a Week", during which he recorded 51 musical pieces, one per week, in an effort to push his creative envelope via a "forced-march approach to writing and recording"; to prove to himself that he could produce creative output to a deadline; and to see whether a professional artist could use the Internet and distribution via Creative Commons to support himself. Rare topical songs include 2005's "W's Duty", which samples President George W. Bush, and 2006's "Tom Cruise Crazy". In a September 2006 interview, he said of the experiment, "In some parts of the country, I'd be making a decent living". In a February 25, 2008, interview with This Week in Tech, he said that he made more money in 2007 than he did in his last year of working as a programmer, 40% of it from digital downloads and 40% from merchandise and performances.

In 2006, Coulton began touring with comedy duo Paul and Storm. Coulton initially opened the concerts, but as his popularity grew, he began headlining.

=== "Still Alive" and album hiatus (2007–2008) ===
Coulton wrote and performed a song titled "Still Alive" for the ending credits of Valve's 2007 video game Portal, with vocals by Ellen McLain. On April 1, 2008, Harmonix made this track available as free downloadable content for the game Rock Band.

A version with Coulton's vocals was also included on the Orange Box Original Soundtrack, in addition to the one heard at the end of the game. "Re: Your Brains" made an appearance as an easter egg in Left 4 Dead 2. "Still Alive" has been called "the most influential game music". In 2011, Coulton followed up the success of "Still Alive" with a new song at the end of Portal 2, "Want You Gone". He also wrote the Portal-themed song "You Wouldn't Know" for Lego Dimensions.

Coulton is also known for original pieces such as "Code Monkey", which was featured on Slashdot on April 23, 2006, and linked from the webcomic Penny Arcade. It was also the theme song for an animated show on G4 called Code Monkeys.

Coulton accompanied John Hodgman on his "700 Hobo Names" promotional track for Hodgman's book The Areas of My Expertise as the guitarist (he was credited as "Jonathan William Coulton, the Colchester Kid"). Coulton also can be heard throughout the audiobook version of the same book, playing the theme song to the book, playing incidental music, and bantering with Hodgman, who reads the audio version of his work. On April 25, 2006, Hodgman mentioned Coulton on The Daily Show: a Jonathan Coulton of Colchester, Connecticut, was Hodgman's pick to win an essay contest on overpowering Iraqi resistance to American invasion. Coulton wrote and performed "the winning entry", a song about dropping snakes from airplanes. Coulton appeared on the tour for Hodgman's second book, More Information Than You Require.

Coulton composed the title music for the show Mystery Diagnosis, and also has contributed other songs under "The Little Gray Book Lectures", a series of audio releases from John Hodgman.

=== The Aftermath and Artificial Heart (2009–2012) ===
Coulton had been working on his follow-up to the Thing a Week albums, tentatively titled The Aftermath. He said the title was an umbrella term for unreleased tracks recorded after Thing a Week. "The Aftermath" was then released in 2009.

A DVD & CD of a concert performed February 22, 2008, at the Great American Music Hall in San Francisco, entitled Best. Concert. Ever. was released in 2009. At the concert, Coulton played "Still Alive" along with guest "musicians" and geek/celebrities Leo Laporte, Merlin Mann and Veronica Belmont. Coulton also opened for They Might Be Giants for a few shows of their March 2010 tour. He toured with them again in February 2012.

On May 25, 2010, Coulton said on his official site that he would work on a new album, to be produced by John Flansburgh of They Might Be Giants, and for the first time ever with a full band, including Marty Beller of They Might Be Giants, in a professional recording studio. The resulting album, Artificial Heart, was released on November 8, 2011. It contains 18 songs, including his two songs from the Portal series.

In May 2012, Coulton became the house musician for the NPR game show Ask Me Another. Coulton performs some of his own songs on the show, as well as covers of other songs related to the trivia and puzzle challenges.

Since 2011, Coulton has hosted his own annual week-long affinity cruise, the JoCo Cruise. The cruise has attracted high profile performers such as Rachel Bloom, Aimee Mann, Josh Gondelman, They Might Be Giants, and Wil Wheaton, among others.

=== Solid State, The SpongeBob Musical, Some Guys, and other projects (2013–present) ===
On April 15, 2013, Coulton announced that he was working with comic book writer Greg Pak on a graphic novel based on the characters in his songs, called Code Monkey Save World. The project was funded on Kickstarter, and reached its goal within 12 hours.

On August 31, 2013, it was announced that Coulton would be contributing lyrics to The SpongeBob Musical, which premiered in Chicago in June 2016. Coulton composed the opening number "Bikini Bottom Day", which is reprised multiple times throughout the show as SpongeBob's main theme. Coulton also contributed to additional lyrics for other musical numbers featured in the show. Along with other musical contributors to the show, Coulton won the Outer Critics Circle Award for Outstanding New Score, and was nominated for Best Original Score for the 72nd Tony Awards.

In June 2016, Coulton started doing a one-minute "Previously On" song at the beginning of the CBS TV series BrainDead, a summer series with a planned run of 13 episodes.

On April 28, 2017, Coulton released a new album Solid State which is for sale through his website and iTunes as well as being available for streaming on SoundCloud.

Coulton co-wrote the songs "Good for Me", "Patient Zero" and "Rollercoaster" with Aimee Mann for her 2017 album "Mental Illness", for which he also contributed acoustic guitar and backing vocals. He joined Mann as opening support act on the European and North American tour of "Mental Illness", contributing additional guitar and vocals to her main set.

On April 15, 2018, The Good Fight episode "Day 450" featured a song by Coulton, set to a short Schoolhouse Rock–style animation. The song echoed the episode's plotline around efforts to impeach Donald Trump and was later shared by the show's YouTube channel.

Coulton contributed other songs to The Good Fight including: "The Legend of John Barron": An animated short explaining the backstory of Donald Trump's alter ego; and "Russian Troll Farms" about the organised online effort by Russia to influence the election.

On March 29, 2019, Coulton released Some Guys, a cover album of songs from the 1970s.

Coulton provided the opening theme for The Adventure Zone: Abnimals in 2024.

For the Disney+ miniseries VisionQuest, Coulton performed the song "Don't Kill the World" as the theme to an in-universe sitcom on the episode "Forever".

== Licensing ==
"Wikipedia Chanukah"
"Wikipedia Chanukah" is licensed under CC BY-SA 3.0; most of Coulton's other songs use BY-NC.

Coulton releases his songs under the Creative Commons Attribution-NonCommercial license, allowing others to use them in their own noncommercial works. As a result, a number of music videos have been created using his songs, including such machinima as the ILL Clan's video for "Code Monkey" and a kinetic typography video for the song "Shop Vac".

In May 2011, Coulton was interviewed on NPR's popular economics-related program Planet Money. He disclosed that he makes about $500,000 a year from his music despite lacking a record label contract. He expressed gratitude towards his fans for his surprise success, the degree of which he called "absurd". In a broader discussion of whether or not the internet is good for musicians, Coulton answered in the affirmative, while journalist Frannie Kelley described his success as a "fluke", comparing it to the unexpected popularity of the Snuggie. Coulton posted a tongue-in-cheek response on his blog about the comparison, saying "to which I say: snarkity snark snark!"

Most of Coulton's songs are published on his website as MP3 and FLAC downloads. Some of them are free, and none of them are subject to digital rights management. All of his original songs fall under the Creative Commons Attribution NonCommercial 3.0 License. "Still Alive", "Want You Gone" and "Wikipedia Chanukah" are the only exceptions to this, as Coulton assigned all rights for the former two songs to Valve and "Wikipedia Chanukah" is under a BY-SA license to comply with Wikipedia's similar license. Along with "Still Alive", Coulton's song "Re: Your Brains" appears in jukeboxes in Left 4 Dead 2. "Want You Gone" also features in the end credits of Portal 2. All three of these games were designed by Valve.

=== Glee dispute ===
One of Coulton's best-known works is his 2005 light-acoustic cover of the Sir Mix-a-Lot hit song "Baby Got Back". Coulton wrote a new melody for his cover version of the song. Coulton's altered cover version was itself covered, but without permission (including his original line "Johnny C's in trouble"), by the American TV series Glee in 2013. Like Coulton's other work, he released his cover version of the song under a Creative Commons 3.0 license, which requires users to attribute the work to him, and forbids all commercial use of it. The show's lawyers contended that they were within their legal rights, and that Coulton should be happy for the exposure, though Coulton received no acknowledgement or credit. Coulton's own lawyers told him that as he only used a compulsory license to make the cover, it would be difficult to sue for damages using the argument that he retained copyright over his own version.

Instead, Coulton released the single "Baby Got Back (In the Style of Glee)", a "cover of Glee's cover of my cover of Sir Mix-a-Lot's song, which is to say it's EXACTLY THE SAME as my original version." Coulton said he would donate the proceeds from all sales until the end of February 2013 to two Glee-related charities: the VH1 Save the Music Foundation and the It Gets Better Project.

In January 2014, the CBS drama The Good Wife based its fifth season episode "Goliath and David" on the incident.

== Discography ==
=== Studio albums ===
- Smoking Monkey (2003)
- Thing a Week One (2006)
- Thing a Week Two (2006)
- Thing a Week Three (2006)
- Thing a Week Four (2006)
- The Aftermath (2009)
- Artificial Heart (2011)
- Solid State (2017)
- Some Guys (2019)

=== EPs ===
- Where Tradition Meets Tomorrow (2004)
- Our Bodies, Ourselves, Our Cybernetic Arms (2005)

=== Compilations ===
- JoCo Looks Back (2008)
- Jonathan Coulton's Greatest Hit (Plus 13 Other Songs) (2012)

=== Live albums ===
- Best. Concert. Ever. (2009)
- JoCo Live (2014)

=== Other releases ===
- Other Experiments (Rarities Collection) (2005)
- Unplugged (Live on Second Life) (2006)
- The Orange Box Original Soundtrack (2007)
  - 1. "Still Alive" (Sung by Ellen McLain)
  - 19. "Still Alive" (Sung by Jonathan Coulton)
- Many Hands: Family Music for Haiti (2010)
  - 10. "The Princess Who Saved Herself"
- Portal 2 Soundtrack: Songs to Test By – Volume 3 (2011)
  - 13. "Want You Gone" (Sung by Ellen McLain)
- One Christmas at a Time (with John Roderick) (2012)
- Lego Dimensions (2015)
  - "You Wouldn't Know" (Sung by Ellen McLain)
- SpongeBob SquarePants: The Broadway Musical (2017)
  - "Bikini Bottom Day" (performed by the cast of SpongeBob SquarePants)

== Other versions and covers ==
- Pianist Louis Durra recorded an instrumental trio version of "Code Monkey" released on "Mad World EP" and "Arrogant Doormats" (2011).
- Band I Fight Dragons covered "The Future Soon" on their "IFD Super Secret Exclusives" EP (2009).
- The Yale Whiffenpoofs, of which Coulton is a former member, recorded a cover of his "Re: Your Brains" on The Best Whiffenpoofs Ever.

== JoCo Cruise ==
Jonathan Coulton is the founder and biggest draw of the JoCo Cruise. The JoCo Cruise was started in 2011. It is a specialized week-long nerd cruise. It is popular with fans of board games, video games, and nerdy music. Jonathan Coulton plays his music live on each of these cruises and attends the cruise himself.

== Accolades ==
In 2018, Coulton was unsuccessfully nominated for a Primetime Emmy for Outstanding Original Music and Lyrics for "High Crimes And Misdemeanors" for The Good Fight.

In 2018, as a songwriter on SpongeBob SquarePants: The Musical, Coulton was unsuccessfully nominated for a Tony for Best Original Score.
