= Code Monkey (song) =

Song by Jonathan Coulton

from the album Thing a Week Three
- Released: April 14, 2006
- Recorded: April 2006
- Length: 3:10
- Label: Self-released
- Songwriter: Jonathan Coulton
- Producer: Jonathan Coulton

"Code Monkey" is a song by Jonathan Coulton, released on 14 April 2006 and part of his album Thing a Week Three released in December 2006.

== Composition ==
"Code Monkey" is about a computer programmer who thinks in ape-like terms, and has been described as a "rocking anthem about dead-end programming jobs." The song was accidentally mastered and released in mono on the album Thing a Week Three. Jonathan Coulton later released the song in stereo for his compilation album JoCo Looks Back.

== Reception ==
The song is one of Coulton's most popular songs and has since been downloaded over one million times. It was the theme song for the animated sitcom Code Monkeys from 2007-2008.
