= Still Alive =

Song featured in the video game Portal

Song by Ellen McLain

from the album The Orange Box Soundtrack
- Released: December 21, 2007
- Recorded: 2007
- Genre: Soundtrack; acoustic rock; video game music
- Length: 2:56
- Label: Valve
- Songwriter: Jonathan Coulton

"Still Alive" is the song that plays over the closing credits of the 2007 video game Portal. It was composed and arranged by Jonathan Coulton and was performed by Ellen McLain, who voiced the Portal antagonist and in-game singer of the song, GLaDOS. Two Valve developers commissioned a song by Coulton, a fan of Valve's Half-Life series, which is set in the same universe as Portal. The song was released on The Orange Box Soundtrack on December 21, 2007, along with an exclusive vocal mix not heard in the game.

The song plays after GLaDOS is defeated by protagonist Chell. Its lyrics, which are displayed on what appears to be a computer console, reveal that GLaDOS is, in fact, "still alive". The song received praise for its humor and the quality of its performance. It has been featured in multiple venues, including at the 2009 Press Start -Symphony of Games-, a yearly Japanese concert event that showcased the musical works of video games. It was released as a free downloadable song for the Rock Band music game series on April 1, 2008. A rerecorded version, with Sara Quin on lead vocals, appears on Coulton's 2011 album Artificial Heart.

== Song ==
The song "Still Alive" was written by Jonathan Coulton and performed by Ellen McLain for the 2007 video game Portal. McLain also provides the voice for GLaDOS in this song, an artificial intelligence and the game's antagonist.

"Still Alive" is sung from the perspective of GLaDOS, used as the song that runs over the game's credits. At the end of the game, Chell, the game's protagonist, who has been misled and placed in life-threatening situations within the Aperture Science Enrichment Center by GLaDOS, eventually defeated her. However, the song disputes this, with GLaDOS asserting that she is "still alive" and that the experience had been a "huge success". She also references Black Mesa from the Half-Life series.

== Background and production ==
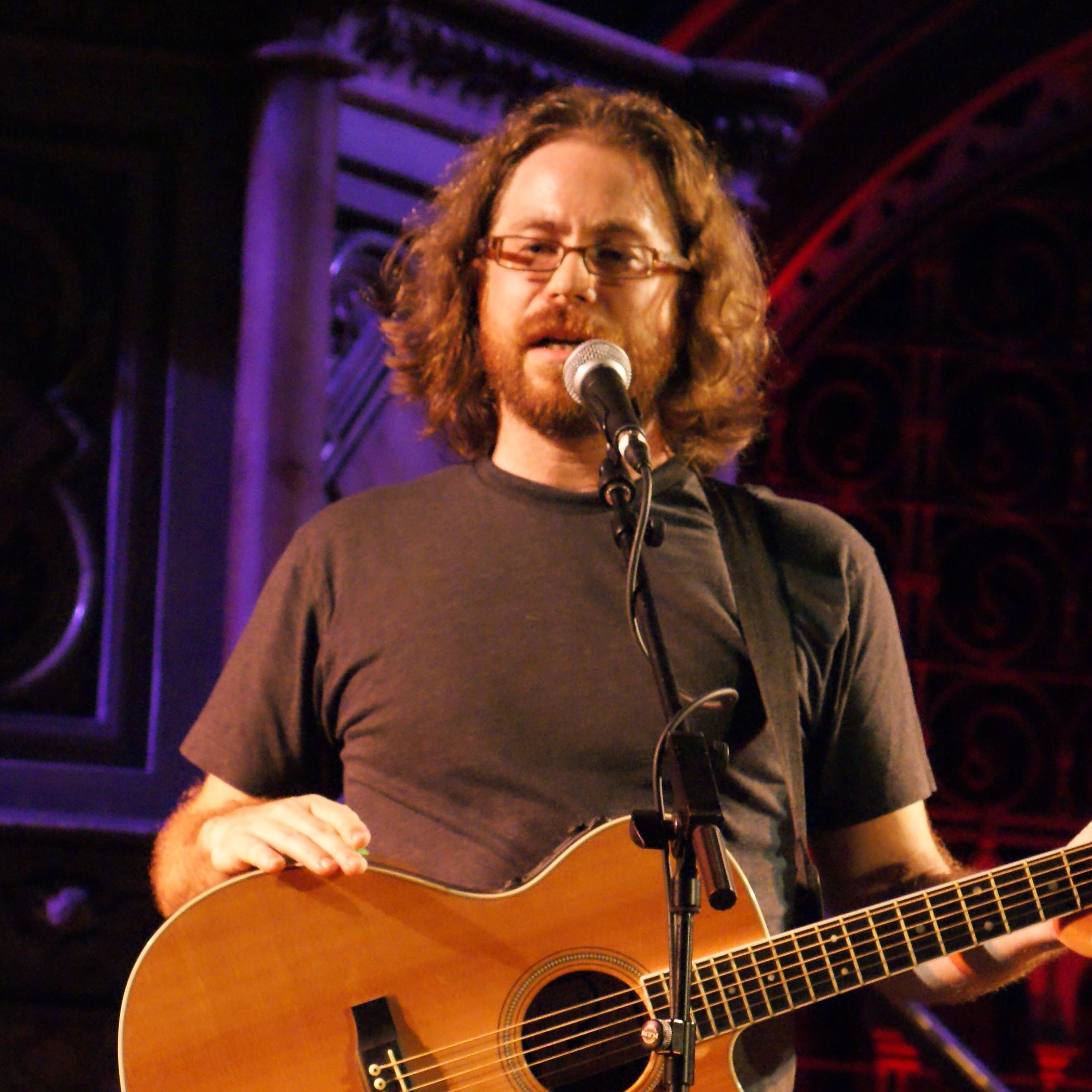
Jonathan Coulton, the composer of "Still Alive"

Coulton was approached by two Valve designers following a concert in Seattle, Washington. They asked him if he would like to write music for the company. Coulton was a fan of Half-Life, so he immediately accepted. After discussing what they should do, he and the designers settled on Portal. By this point, a few months before the release of The Orange Box, Valve's writers had created a large amount of backstory for GLaDOS and other aspects of Portal, which Coulton used to write the lyrics. As GLaDOS grew more important to Portal's story, McLain was asked to sing for the game, since she was a trained operatic soprano, given a scratch vocal version by Coulton. McLain's singing, which Coulton described as conveying "emotion in a non-emotional way", was modified to sound computerized. The overall process took about six weeks to complete. Coulton found it difficult to get GLaDOS' voice out of his head. Kim Swift, lead designer of Portal, explained that the song was chosen to play during the credits because they wanted to leave players feeling happy.

The song is also present as a samba instrumental version through in-game radios at certain points in the game. On 9 December 2022, the Portal 2 Soundtrack was updated, now including this instrumental and the original raw, unfiltered music. The unfiltered version was also featured in Portal RTX.

When Coulton began work on a theme for the Portal-connected 2015 video game Lego Dimensions, he exclaimed that the song was a "phenomenon ... out of control", and that the song benefited from the writing and its context in the game. He found composing the Lego Dimensions song, "You Wouldn't Know", easier to do once he accepted that he would not be able to make a song as big as "Still Alive" again.

== Reception ==
"Still Alive" was met with universal acclaim. USgamer writer Nadia Oxford called it "legendary". Vice writer Jagger Gravning called it the most famous lyric-based video game song. A large majority of video game critics who awarded Portal game of the year mentioned "Still Alive" as one of the game's qualities, while Portal designer Chet Faliszek felt that it was part of why Portal was special. Former LucasArts employee and Sinistar designer Noah Falstein felt that the song improved the game, and that more games should include such a fitting song. He praised McLain's performance as "pitch-perfect" and the song as "catchy". IGN writer Ryan Geddes called it the best game-ending song of all time. Mashable writer Kellen Beck found it one of the most recognizable. In the book The Art of Videogames, author Grant Tavinor wrote that while he was in hysterics by the song, he got the sense of artistic completion upon hearing it. 1UP.com's Alice Liang called the ending to Portal "catchy, charming, surprising, and humorously bittersweet". Kyle Hilliard of Game Informer included the song in a list of surprising musical numbers in video games, while fellow Game Informer writer Michael Leri featured it in a list of "awesome" non-interactive credits sequences. UGO writer Melissa Meli felt sick of the song due to how often they heard it, but still recognized the game's soundtrack as "one of the most endearing and original soundtracks in gaming history". Sara Goodwin of The Mary Sue called it one of the best villain songs, calling it "pretty" and the lyrics "amazing and chilling". Paste Magazine writer Nathan Spicer felt that it was a video game song that could be enjoyed regardless of someone's familiarity with Portal.

McLain praised Coulton for capturing GLaDOS in the song. She debuted the song in live public performance at Anime Midwest in Chicago.

The song was called the most memorable moment of 2007 by Good Game, the Australian Broadcasting Corporation television series. It received the 2008 "Best Original Vocal - Pop Song" award by the Game Audio Network Guild.

Coulton experienced a surge in popularity after the release of Portal. It is credited with earning Coulton "cult status". Valve hired him to work on the soundtrack of the sequel, Portal 2.

The Press Start -Symphony of Games- performance received criticism from Video Game Music Online author Cedille, who felt that the lyrics sounded "childish" when translated into Japanese, and that the singer gave a "faceless performance" that made it "painful and dreadful". Cedille was appreciative of the efforts made to demonstrate Portal to Japanese audiences, but questioned the need to translate it into Japanese and feature a different singer. The Covey remix in "The Greatest Video Game Music 2" album was considered a weaker song in said album, with fellow Video Game Music Online Jon Hammond finding the instrumental aspects nice, but feeling that Covey sounded like she was trying too hard to sing well, sacrificing the song's humor. Video Game Music Online critic Oliver Jia felt that the original version of "Still Alive" was one of the most memorable video game themes, but felt that the performance on the Video Games Live Level 3 album ruined it due both to the fact that they used a live recording that sounded worse than other songs on the album, but also due to the crowd singing and clapping along, making it sound "overly cheesy and poorly done".

== In other media ==
It was featured in The Orange Box Original Soundtrack released on Steam, containing both the original version and remix sung by Coulton himself. It was given a remix by singer Sarah Covey in the album, "The Greatest Video Game Music 2". It had been played live at the third Video Games Live concert, and released as part of the album Video Games Live Level 3. Coulton worked with They Might Be Giants songwriter John Flansburgh on a new version of "Still Alive" for an album by Coulton in 2013. It was included in the Vitamin String Quartet's Geek Wedding Album. A vinyl disc was released to celebrate Portal's 10th anniversary in 2017, featuring "Still Alive".

The song is also present in Valve's zombie-themed Left 4 Dead 2, which can be selected to play on a jukebox in three different campaigns. The opening line for "Still Alive" ("This was a triumph. I'm making a note here: HUGE SUCCESS.") was featured in the Valve game Counter-Strike: Global Offensive. This was thought to be an alternate reality game about a potential Portal sequel, but was later confirmed to just be an Easter egg. In the Portal game mod "Portal Prelude", a remix of "Still Alive" can be heard on several radios throughout the game, however, they are not performed by GLaDOS. The spin-off Bridge Constructor Portal features a cameo appearance of the song. A Christmas-themed remix of "Still Alive" was created for Valve's Aperture Science website, showing a moving image of the Weighted Companion Cube with a Santa Claus hat, ending with a message reading "HAPPY [HOLIDAY NAME HERE]". A special Microsoft Windows port of the Xbox Live Arcade title, Chime, includes "Still Alive" as an additional music stage for the game.

=== In Rock Band ===
"Still Alive" was featured as a downloadable song in multiple games in the Rock Band series, including Rock Band, Rock Band 2, and Rock Band Unplugged. It was included for free on the Xbox 360, Wii and PlayStation 3 to thank players for supporting the series. After complaints about Rock Band Unplugged's version not being free, this was rectified and anyone who paid for it had their money refunded. After a content pack for Rock Band was hacked, a list of songs purported to be included was released which included "Still Alive". Jonathan Coulton and three others performed this song on Rock Band, announcing its presence in the title as a downloadable song.

=== Live performances ===
Singer Mariko Otsuka performed the song at the 2009 Press Start -Symphony of Games-, a yearly Japanese concert that showcased the musical works of video games. "Still Alive" was the first Western song to be performed at the show, which included a Japanese translation by Kazushige Nojima, a writer of several Final Fantasy games, and arrangement for the Tokyo Philharmonic Orchestra. Because Portal was relatively unknown in Japan, Masahiro Sakurai, director of Super Smash Bros. Brawl, demonstrated the game to the audience before the performance.

== See also ==
- Music of Portal 2
