= Portal (video game) =

2007 video game

- Developer: Valve (Note: Nvidia Lightspeed Studios developed the Nvidia Shield, Nintendo Switch versions and the RTX mod version for Windows.)
- Publisher: Valve
- Designer: Kim Swift
- Writers: Erik Wolpaw; Chet Faliszek
- Composers: Kelly Bailey; Mike Morasky
- Series: Portal
- Engine: Source
- Platforms: Windows; Xbox 360; PlayStation 3; Mac OS X; Linux; Android; Nintendo Switch
- Release: October 10, 2007: Windows, Xbox 360; NA: October 10, 2007; EU: October 18, 2007; AU: October 25, 2007; PlayStation 3; AU: November 22, 2007; EU: November 23, 2007; NA: December 11, 2007; Mac OS X; WW: May 12, 2010; Linux; WW: May 2, 2013; Android; WW: May 12, 2014; Nintendo Switch; WW: June 28, 2022
- Genre: Puzzle-platform
- Mode: Single-player

Portal is a 2007 puzzle-platform game developed and published by Valve. It was originally released in a bundle, The Orange Box, for Windows, Xbox 360 and PlayStation 3, and has been ported to other systems, including Mac OS X, Linux, Android (via Nvidia Shield), and Nintendo Switch.

Portal is a first person game. It consists primarily of a series of puzzles that must be solved by teleporting the player's character and simple objects using the "Aperture Science Handheld Portal Device", also referred to as the "portal gun", a device that can create portals between locations in the puzzles. The player character, Chell, is challenged and taunted by an artificial intelligence construct named GLaDOS (Genetic Lifeform and Disk Operating System) to complete each puzzle in the Aperture Science Enrichment Center using the portal gun with the promise of receiving cake when all the puzzles are completed. The Source engine's physics system allows kinetic energy to be retained through portals, requiring creative use of portals to maneuver through the test chambers. This gameplay element is based on a similar concept from the game Narbacular Drop; many of the team members from the DigiPen Institute of Technology who worked on Narbacular Drop were hired by Valve for the creation of Portal.

Portal was acclaimed as one of the most original games of 2007, despite some criticism for its short duration. It received praise for its originality, unique gameplay, dark story and sense of comedy. The character of GLaDOS, voiced by Ellen McLain, received acclaim for her unique characterization and the end credits song "Still Alive", written by Jonathan Coulton, was praised for its original composition and humor. Portal is often cited as one of the greatest video games ever made. Excluding Steam download sales, over four million copies have been sold, spawning merchandise from Valve including a model portal gun and plush Companion Cubes, as well as fan recreations of the cake.

A standalone version with extra puzzles, Portal: Still Alive, containing many recreated levels from a fan-made flash game, was published by Valve on the Xbox Live Arcade service in October 2008 for Xbox 360. A sequel, Portal 2, was released in 2011, which expanded on the storyline, added several gameplay mechanics, and included a cooperative multiplayer mode and level creator. A port for the Nintendo Switch was released as part of the Portal: Companion Collection in June 2022, which included the additional levels from the Still Alive release of the game. On December 8, 2022, a free remaster developed by Nvidia's Lightspeed Studios with Valve's permission was published on Steam under the name Portal with RTX in order to showcase Nvidia's RTX Remix tool.

== Gameplay ==
A representation of how the (magnitude of) linear momentum is conserved through portals. By jumping into the blue portal, the player is launched out of the orange portal and onto the platform on the right.

A more advanced portal technique. The player builds up speed using two blue portals to reach an otherwise unreachable area; after exiting the orange portal for the first time, the second blue portal is carefully created in mid-air, destroying the first blue portal in the process.

In Portal, the player controls the protagonist, Chell, from a first-person perspective as she navigates a series of test chambers using the Aperture Science Handheld Portal Device, commonly known as the portal gun, under the supervision of the artificial intelligence GLaDOS. The portal gun can create two distinct portal ends, blue and orange, which connect different locations within the test chambers. The portals form a connection between two points in three-dimensional space, allowing Chell and objects to pass between them. Neither portal functions exclusively as an entrance or exit, as objects entering one emerge from the other. The game's physics preserve an object's momentum as it passes through a portal, while its trajectory is determined by the orientation of the exit portal.

A common maneuver involves placing one portal below the player, falling through it to gain speed, and emerging from another portal positioned on a wall or other surface. This technique allows the player to redirect momentum and launch Chell or objects across gaps and other obstacles. The technique is commonly referred to as "flinging". When portal surfaces are positioned at different orientations, the player's orientation changes when passing through them so that the character remains aligned with the game's gravitational direction.

Chell and objects that fit through the portal openings can pass between them, while portals cannot be fired through an existing open portal. Portals cannot be placed on moving objects, glass, certain surfaces, liquids, or areas that are too small to accommodate them. Chell can pick up weighted storage cubes and use them to climb or hold down large buttons that activate doors and other mechanisms. Particle fields known as "Emancipation Grills" appear at the ends of test chambers and in other locations; passing through them removes active portals and destroys objects carried through them. The fields also prevent the player from firing portals through them.

Chell is equipped with mechanical heel springs that reduce the effects of falling, but she can still be killed by hazards including automated turrets, energy projectiles, toxic liquid, falling objects, and crushing mechanisms. The game does not display a conventional health bar; instead, Chell dies after sustaining sufficient damage within a short period. Certain hazards, including some energy projectiles and crushing mechanisms, can kill her immediately.

The test chambers can be completed through different solutions, with players able to use the portal mechanics and physics in different ways to overcome the puzzles. After completing the main game, two additional modes become available: Challenge Chambers and Advanced Chambers. Challenge Chambers revisit existing test chambers with additional objectives based on completing them with the fewest portals, the fewest footsteps, or the shortest time. Advanced Chambers modify existing chambers by adding obstacles and other hazards.

== Synopsis ==
=== Characters ===
Portal features two prominent characters: the player-controlled silent protagonist named Chell, and GLaDOS (Genetic Lifeform and Disk Operating System), a computer artificial intelligence that monitors and directs the player. In the English-language version, GLaDOS is voiced by Ellen McLain, though her voice has been altered to sound more artificial. The only background information presented about Chell is given by GLaDOS; the credibility of these facts, such as Chell being adopted, an orphan, and having no friends, is questionable at best, as GLaDOS is a liar by her own admission. In the "Lab Rat" comic created by Valve to bridge the gap between Portal and Portal 2, Chell's records reveal she was ultimately rejected as a test subject for having "too much tenacity"—the main reason Doug Rattmann, a former employee of Aperture Science, moved Chell to the top of the test queue.

=== Setting ===
The logo for Aperture Science Laboratories

Portal takes place in the Half-Life universe and within the Aperture Science Computer-Aided Enrichment Center, a research facility responsible for the creation of the portal gun. Information about Aperture Science, developed by Valve for creating its setting, is revealed during the game and via the real-world promotional website. According to the Aperture Science website, Cave Johnson founded the company in 1943 for the purpose of making shower curtains for the U.S. military. After becoming mentally unstable from "moon rock poisoning" in 1978, Johnson created a three-tier research and development plan to make his organization successful. The first two tiers, the Counter-Heimlich Maneuver (a maneuver designed to ensure choking) and the Take-A-Wish Foundation (a program to give the wishes of terminally ill children to adults in need of dreams), were commercial failures and led to an investigation of the company by the U.S. Senate. However, when the investigative committee heard of the success of the third tier—a person-sized, ad hoc quantum tunnel through physical space, with a possible application as a shower curtain—it recessed permanently and gave Aperture Science an open-ended contract to continue its research. The development of GLaDOS, an artificially intelligent research assistant and disk-operating system, began in 1986 in an attempt to speed up portal technology research in competition with Black Mesa's work on similar portal technology.

A presentation seen during gameplay reveals that GLaDOS was included in a proposed bid for de-icing fuel lines, incorporated as a fully functional disk-operation system that is arguably alive, unlike Black Mesa's proposal, which inhibits ice, nothing more. After contracting a terminal illness from moon rocks used in portal experiments, Cave decides to attempt to back up his consciousness to a computer. He realises that the technology will not be ready in time to backup his brain due to his imminent demise, and leaves instructions to forcefully backup the consciousness of his assistant Caroline. Upon being uploaded to GLaDOS, Caroline attempts to kill every scientist in the building in under a fraction of a second. After extensive attempts to control her with smaller robots called personality spheres that would act as emotional limits and a sort of artificial "conscience", GLaDOS managed to eventually convince the scientists that she was primarily concerned with science and requested a lethal brain neurotoxin for an experiment about cats. GLaDOS initiated the experiment during the company's first annual bring-your-daughter-to-work day in 1998. Immediately after activation, the facility was flooded with deadly neurotoxin by the AI. Events of the first Half-Life game occur shortly after that, presumably leaving the facility forgotten by the outside world due to apocalyptic happenings. Wolpaw, in describing the ending of Portal 2, affirmed that the Combine invasion, chronologically taking place after Half-Life and before Half-Life 2, had occurred before Portal 2's events.

The areas of the Enrichment Center that Chell explores suggest that it is part of a massive research installation. At the time of events depicted in Portal, the facility seems to be long-deserted, although most of its equipment remains operational without human control.

=== Plot ===
The game begins with Chell waking up from a stasis bed and hearing instructions from GLaDOS, an artificial intelligence, about upcoming tests. Chell enters into sequential distinct chambers that introduce her to varying challenges to solve using her portal gun, with GLaDOS as her only interaction. GLaDOS promises cake as a reward for Chell if she completes all the test chambers. As Chell nears completion, GLaDOS's motives and behavior turn more sinister, suggesting insincerity and callous disregard for the safety and well-being of test subjects. The test chambers become increasingly dangerous as Chell proceeds, including a live-fire course designed for military androids, as well as chambers flooded with a hazardous liquid. In one chamber, GLaDOS forces Chell to "euthanize" a Weighted Companion Cube in an incinerator, after Chell uses it for assistance.

After Chell completes the final test chamber, GLaDOS maneuvers Chell into an incinerator in an attempt to kill her. Chell escapes with the portal gun and makes her way through the maintenance areas within the Enrichment Center. GLaDOS panics and insists that she was pretending to kill Chell as part of testing, while it becomes clear that GLaDOS had previously killed all the inhabitants of the center. Chell travels further through the maintenance areas, discovering dilapidated backstage areas covered in graffiti that includes statements such as "the cake is a lie", and pastiches of quotes from famous poets such as Henry Wadsworth Longfellow and Emily Brontë.

Despite GLaDOS's attempts to dissuade her with lies and threats, Chell proceeds and eventually confronts GLaDOS in a large chamber where her hardware hangs overhead. A sphere falls from GLaDOS and Chell drops it in an incinerator. GLaDOS reveals that the sphere was the morality core of her conscience, one of multiple personality cores that Aperture Science employees installed after she flooded the center with neurotoxin gas; with the core removed, she can access the neurotoxin emitters again. A six-minute countdown starts as Chell dislodges and incinerates more of GLaDOS' personality cores, while GLaDOS mocks and attacks her. After Chell destroys the last personality core, a malfunction tears the room apart and transports everything to the surface. Chell lies outside the facility's gates amid the remains of GLaDOS, and is promptly dragged away by an unseen robotic entity. (Note: The game's original ending does not include the entity taking Chell, and was retroactively included following the announcement of Portal 2.)

The final scene, viewed within the bowels of the facility, shows a candlelit Black Forest cake, and a Weighted Companion Cube, surrounded by shelves containing dozens of inactive personality cores. The cores begin to light up, before a robotic arm descends and extinguishes the candle on the cake, casting the room into darkness. Over the credits, GLaDOS delivers a concluding report through the song "Still Alive", declaring the experiment to be a success.

== Development ==
=== Narbacular Drop ===
Portal began with the 2005 freeware game Narbacular Drop, developed by students of the DigiPen Institute of Technology. Robin Walker, one of Valve's developers, saw the game at the DigiPen's career fair. Impressed, he contacted the team with advice and offered to show Narbacular Drop at Valve's offices. After their presentation, Valve's president Gabe Newell offered the team jobs at Valve to develop it further. Newell said he was impressed with the team as "they had actually carried the concept through", already having included the interaction between portals and physics, completing most of the work that Valve would have had to commit on their own.

To test the effectiveness of the portal mechanic, the team made a prototype in an in-house 2D game engine that is used in DigiPen. Certain elements were retained from Narbacular Drop, such as the system of identifying the two unique portal endpoints with the colors orange and blue. A key difference is that Portal's portal gun cannot create a portal through an existing portal, unlike in Narbacular Drop. The original setting, of a princess trying to escape a dungeon, was dropped in favor of the Aperture Science approach. Portal took approximately two years and four months to complete after the DigiPen team was brought into Valve, and no more than ten people were involved with its development.

=== Story ===
For the first year of development, the team focused mostly on the gameplay without narrative structure. Playtesters found the game fun but asked about what these test chambers were leading towards. This prompted the team to come up with a narrative for Portal. The team worked with Marc Laidlaw, the writer of the Valve's Half-Life series, to fit Portal into the Half-Life universe. This was done in part because of the project's limited art resources; instead of creating art assets for Portal, the team reused the Half-Life 2 assets. Laidlaw opposed the crossover, feeling it "made both universes smaller", and said later: "I just had to react as gracefully as I could to the fact that it was going there without me. It didn't make any sense except from a resource-restricted point of view."

Valve hired Erik Wolpaw and Chet Faliszek to write Portal. Wolpaw felt that the constraints improved the game. The concept of a computer AI guiding the player through experimental facilities to test the portal gun was arrived at early in the writing process. They drafted early lines for a "polite" AI with humorous situations, such as requesting the player's character to "assume the party escort submission position", and found this style of approach to be well-suited to the game they wanted to create, leading to the creation of the GLaDOS character. GLaDOS was central to the plot. Wolpaw said: "We designed the game to have a very clear beginning, middle, and end, and we wanted GLaDOS to go through a personality shift at each of these points."

Wolpaw described the idea of using cake as the reward came about as "at the beginning of the Portal development process, we sat down as a group to decide what philosopher or school of philosophy our game would be based on. That was followed by about 15 minutes of silence and then someone mentioned that a lot of people like cake." The cake element, along with additional messages given to the player in the behind-the-scenes areas, were written and drawn by Kim Swift.

=== Design ===
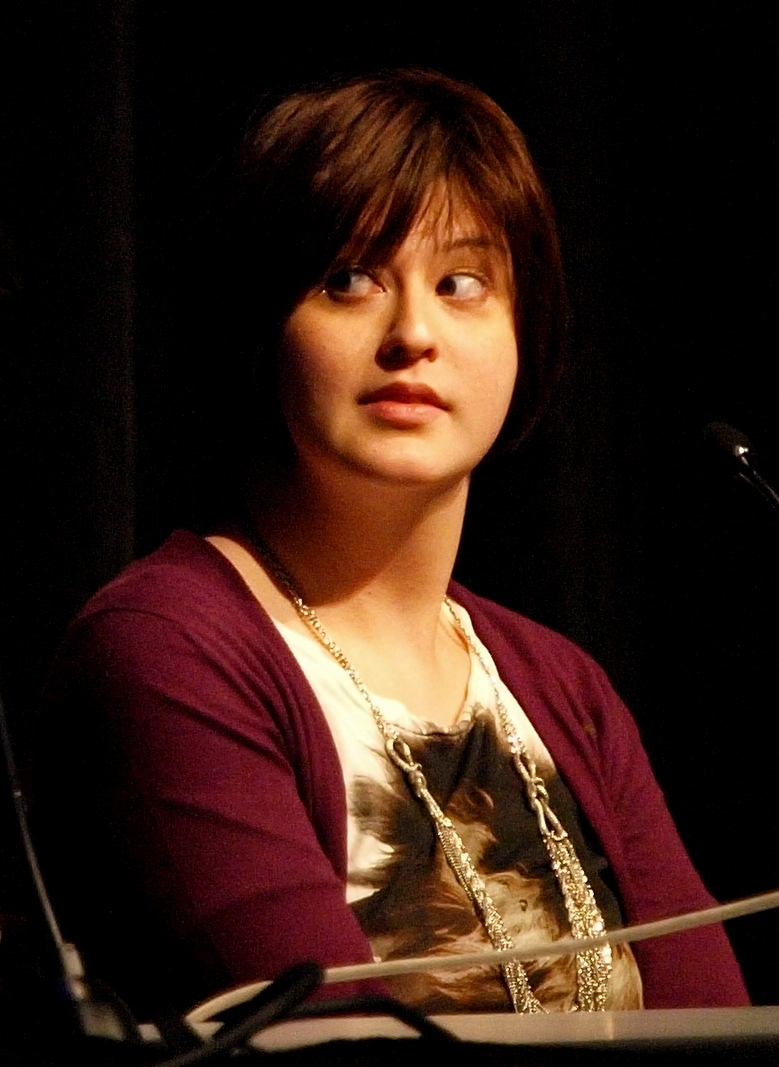
Designer Kim Swift in 2010

The austere settings in the game came about because testers spent too much time trying to complete the puzzles using decorative but non-functional elements. As a result, the setting was minimized to make the usable aspects of the puzzle easier to spot, using the clinical feel of the setting in the film The Island as reference. While there were plans for a third area, an office space, to be included after the test chambers and the maintenance areas, the team ran out of time to include it. They dropped the introduction of the Rat Man, a character who left the messages in the maintenance areas, to avoid creating too much narrative for the game, though the character was developed further in a tie-in comic "Lab Rat", that ties Portal and Portal 2's story together. According to project lead Kim Swift, the final battle with GLaDOS went through many iterations, including having the player chased by James Bond-inspired lasers (later applied in part to the turrets), a concept jokingly nicknamed "Portal Kombat" where the player would have needed to redirect rockets while avoiding turret fire, and a chase sequence following a fleeing GLaDOS. Eventually, they found that playtesters enjoyed a rather simple puzzle with a countdown timer near the end; Swift noted how "time pressure makes people think something is a lot more complicated than it really is", and Wolpaw admitted, "It was really cheap to make [the neurotoxin gas]" in order to simplify the dialogue during the battle.

Chell's face and body are modeled after Alésia Glidewell, an American freelance actress and voice-over artist, selected by Valve from a local modeling agency for her face and body structure. Ellen McLain provided the voice of the antagonist GLaDOS. Wolpaw noted, "When we were still fishing around for the turret voice, Ellen did a sultry version. It didn't work for the turrets, but we liked it a lot, and so a slightly modified version of that became the model for GLaDOS's final incarnation."

The Weighted Companion Cube inspiration was from project lead Kim Swift with additional input from Wolpaw from reading some "declassified government interrogation thing" whereby "isolation leads subjects to begin to attach to inanimate objects"; Swift commented, "We had a long level called Box Marathon; we wanted players to bring this box with them from the beginning to the end. But people would forget about the box, so we added dialogue, applied the heart to the cube, and continued to up the ante until people became attached to the box. Later on, we added the incineration idea. The artistic expression grew from the gameplay." Wolpaw further noted that the need to incinerate the Weighted Companion Cube came as a result of the final boss battle design; they recognized they had not introduced the idea of incineration necessary to complete the boss battle, and by training the player to do it with the Weighted Companion Cube, found the narrative "way stronger" with its "death". Swift noted that any similarities to psychological situations in the Milgram experiment or 2001: A Space Odyssey are entirely coincidental.

The portal gun's full name, Aperture Science Handheld Portal Device, can be abbreviated as ASHPD, which resembles a shortening of the name Adrian Shephard, the protagonist of Half-Life: Opposing Force. Fans noticed this similarity before Portal's release; as a result, the team placed a red herring by having the letters of Adrian Shephard highlighted on keyboards found within the game. According to Swift, the cake is a Black Forest cake that she thought looked the best at the nearby Regent Bakery and Cafe in Redmond, Washington, and, as an Easter egg, its recipe is scattered among various screens showing lines of binary code. The Regent Bakery has stated that since the release of Portal, its Black Forest cake has been one of its more popular items.

=== Soundtrack ===
Most of the soundtrack is non-lyrical ambient music composed by Kelly Bailey and Mike Morasky, somewhat dark and mysterious to match the mood of the environments. The closing credits song, "Still Alive", was written by Jonathan Coulton and sung by Ellen McLain (a classically trained operatic soprano) as the GLaDOS character. A brief instrumental version of "Still Alive" is played in an uptempo Latin style over radios in-game. Wolpaw notes that Coulton was invited to Valve a year before the release of Portal, though it was not yet clear where Coulton would contribute. "Once Kim [Swift] and I met with him, it quickly became apparent that he had the perfect sensibility to write a song for GLaDOS." The use of the song over the closing credits was based on a similar concept from the game God Hand, one of Wolpaw's favorite titles. The song was released as a free downloadable song for the music video game Rock Band on April 1, 2008. The soundtrack for Portal was released as a part of The Orange Box Original Soundtrack. The soundtrack was released in a four-disc retail bundle, Portal 2: Songs To Test By (Collector's Edition), on October 30, 2012, featuring music from both games. The soundtrack was released via Steam Music on September 24, 2014.

== Release ==
Portal was first released as part of The Orange Box for Windows and Xbox 360 on October 10, 2007, and for the PlayStation 3 on December 11, 2007. In addition to Portal, The Orange Box includes Half-Life 2 and its two add-on episodes, as well as Team Fortress 2. Portal's inclusion within The Orange Box was considered an experiment by Valve; having no idea of the success of Portal, the bundle provided it a "safety net" via means of these other games. Portal was kept to a modest length in case the game did not go over well with players. The game was released as a standalone retail product on April 9, 2008, with the Windows version also available as a download through Steam.

In January 2008, Valve released a special demo titled Portal: The First Slice, free to any Steam user using Nvidia graphics hardware, as part of a collaboration between the two companies. The demo comes packaged with Half-Life 2: Deathmatch, Peggle Extreme, and Half-Life 2: Lost Coast. The demo includes test chambers 00 to 10 (eleven in total). Valve has since made the demo available to all Steam users.

Portal is the first Valve-developed game to be added to the OS X-compatible list of games available on the launch of the Steam client for Mac on May 12, 2010, supporting Steam Play, in which buying the game on Macintosh or Windows computer makes it playable on both. As part of the promotion, Portal was offered as a free game for any Steam user during the two weeks following the Mac client's launch. Within the first week of this offer, over 1.5 million copies were downloaded through Steam. A similar promotion was held in September 2011, near the start of a traditional school year, encouraging the use of the game as an educational tool for science and mathematics. Valve wrote that they felt that Portal "makes physics, math, logic, spatial reasoning, probability, and problem-solving interesting, cool, and fun", a necessary feature to draw children into learning. This was tied to Digital Promise, a United States Department of Education initiative to help develop digital tools for education, which Valve is part of.

Portal: Still Alive was announced for Xbox Live Arcade at the 2008 E3 convention, and was released on October 22, 2008. It features the original game, 14 new challenges, and new achievements. The additional content was based on levels from the map pack Portal: The Flash Version created by We Create Stuff and contains no additional story-related levels. According to Valve spokesman Doug Lombardi, Microsoft had previously rejected Portal on the platform due to its large size. Portal: Still Alive was well received by reviewers. 1UP.com's Andrew Hayward stated that, with the easier access and lower cost than paying for The Orange Box, Portal is now "stronger than ever". IGN editor Cam Shea ranked it fifth on his top 10 list of Xbox Live Arcade games. He stated that it was debatable whether an owner of The Orange Box should purchase this, as its added levels do not add to the plot. However, he praised the quality of the new maps included. The game ranked 7th in a later list of top Xbox Live Arcade titles compiled by IGN's staff in September 2010.

During the 2014 GPU Technology Conference, Nvidia announced a port of Portal to the Nvidia Shield. The port was released on May 12, 2014. Alongside Portal 2, Portal was released on the Nintendo Switch on June 28, 2022, as part of the Portal: Companion Collection, developed by Valve and Nvidia Lightspeed Studios. Portal with RTX was announced by Nvidia during its GeForce Beyond event in September 2022. A remaster of the original, the game is intended to demonstrate the functionality of the GeForce 40 series graphics cards with real-time path tracing. Initially planned for release in November 2022, it was ultimately released December 8, 2022, as a free DLC.

== Reception ==
=== Critical reception ===
Reception

Aggregate score
Aggregator	Score
Metacritic	PC: 90/100; X360 (Still Alive): 90/100; PC (RTX): 89/100

Review scores
Publication	Score
1Up.com	A
Eurogamer	9/10
GameSpot	9.0/10
GameSpy	4.5/5.0
IGN	8.2/10

Portal received critical acclaim, often earning more praise than either Half-Life 2: Episode Two or Team Fortress 2, two titles also included in The Orange Box. It was praised for its unique gameplay and dark, deadpan humor. Eurogamer cited that "the way the game progresses from being a simple set of perfunctory tasks to a full-on part of the Half-Life story is absolute genius", while GameSpy noted, "What Portal lacks in length, it more than makes up for in exhilaration." The game was criticized for sparse environments, and both criticized and praised for its short length. Aggregate reviews for the standalone PC version of Portal gave the game a 90/100 through 28 reviews on Metacritic. In 2011, Valve stated that Portal had sold more than four million copies through the retail versions, including the standalone game and The Orange Box, and from the Xbox Live Arcade version.

The game generated a fan following for the Weighted Companion Cube—even though the cube itself does not talk or act in the game. Fans have created plush and papercraft versions of the cube and the various turrets, as well as PC case mods and models of the Portal cake and portal gun. Jeep Barnett, a programmer for Portal, noted that players have told Valve that they had found it more emotional to incinerate the Weighted Companion Cube than to harm one of the "Little Sisters" from BioShock. Both GLaDOS and the Weighted Companion Cube were nominated for the Best New Character Award on G4, with GLaDOS winning the award for "having lines that will be quoted by gamers for years to come." Ben Croshaw of Zero Punctuation praised the game as "absolutely sublime from start to finish ... I went in expecting a slew of interesting portal-based puzzles and that's exactly what I got, but what I wasn't expecting was some of the funniest pitch black humor I've ever heard in a game". He felt the short length was ideal as it did not outstay its welcome.

Writing for GameSetWatch in 2009, columnist Daniel Johnson pointed out similarities between Portal and Erving Goffman's essay on dramaturgy, The Presentation of Self in Everyday Life, which equates one's persona to the front and backstage areas of a theater. The game was also made part of the required course material among other classical and contemporary works, including Goffman's work, for a freshman course "devoted to engaging students with fundamental questions of humanity from multiple perspectives and fostering a sense of community" for Wabash College in 2010. Portal has been cited as a strong example of instructional scaffolding that can be adapted for more academic learning situations, as the player, through careful design of levels by Valve, is first hand-held in solving simple puzzles with many hints at the correct solution, but this support is slowly removed as the player progresses in the game, and completely removed when the player reaches the second half of the game. Rock, Paper, Shotgun's Hamish Todd considered Portal as an exemplary means of game design by demonstrating a series of chambers after the player has obtained the portal gun that gently introduce the concept of flinging without any explicit instructions. Portal was exhibited at the Smithsonian Art Exhibition in America from February 14 through September 30, 2012. Portal won the "Action" section for the platform "Modern Windows".

Portal is considered one of the best video games of all time, having been included on several cumulative "Top Games of All Time" lists through 2018.

=== Awards ===
Year	Award	Category	Result	Ref
2008	11th Annual Interactive Achievement Awards	Outstanding Achievement in Gameplay Engineering	Won	
2008	11th Annual Interactive Achievement Awards	Outstanding Achievement in Game Design	Won	
2008	11th Annual Interactive Achievement Awards	Outstanding Character Performance (GLaDOS, Ellen McLain)	Won	
2008	Game Developers Choice Awards	Game of the Year	Won	
2008	Game Developers Choice Awards	Innovation Award	Won	
2008	Game Developers Choice Awards	Best Game Design	Won	
2007	IGN Best of 2007	Best Puzzle Game (PC, Xbox 360, Overall)	Won	
2007	IGN Best of 2007	Most Innovative Design (PC, Overall)	Won	
2007	IGN Best of 2007	Best End Credit Song ("Still Alive")	Won	
2007	GameSpot Best of 2007	Best Puzzle Game	Won	
2007	GameSpot Best of 2007	Best New Character (GLaDOS)	Won	
2007	GameSpot Best of 2007	Funniest Game	Won	
2007	GameSpot Best of 2007	Best Original Game Mechanic (Portal Gun)	Won	
2007	1UP.com Editorial Awards	Game of the Year (PC)	Won	
2007	GamePro Editors' Choice	Most Memorable Villain (GLaDOS)	Won	
2007	Joystiq	Game of the Year	Won	
2007	X-Play Best of 2007	Most Original Game	Won	
2007	Official Xbox Magazine Game of the Year Awards	Best New Character (GLaDOS), Best Original Song ("Still Alive"), Innovation of the Year	Won	
2007	GameSpy Game of the Year Awards	Best Puzzle Game, Best Character (GLaDOS), Best Sidekick (Companion Cube)	Won	
2007	The A.V. Club	Best Game of 2007	Won	
2007	Penny Arcade We're Right Awards	Best Soundtrack, Best Writing, Best New Game Mechanic	Won	
2007	Eurogamer	Top 50 Games of 2007 (Rank #1)	Won	
2010	IGN	#1 Video Game Villain (GLaDOS)	Won	
2015	GamesRadar	Best Game of All Time	Won	
2012	Time	100 Greatest Video Games of All Time	Won	
2009	Wired	Most Influential Games of the Decade	Won	

== Legacy ==
The popularity of the Weighted Companion Cube led Valve to create merchandise based on it, including fuzzy dice.

The popularity of the game and its characters led Valve to develop merchandise for Portal made available through its online Valve physical merchandise store. Some of the more popular items were the Weighted Companion Cube plush toys and fuzzy dice. When first released, both were sold out in under 24 hours. Other products available through the Valve store include T-shirts and Aperture Science coffee mugs and parking stickers, and merchandise relating to the phrase "the cake is a lie", which has become an internet meme. Wolpaw noted they did not expect certain elements of the game to be as popular as they were, while other elements they had expected to become fads were ignored, such as a giant hoop that rolls on-screen during the final scene of the game that the team had named Hoopy.

Swift stated that future Portal developments would depend on the community's reactions, saying, "We're still playing it by ear at this point, figuring out if we want to do multiplayer next, or Portal 2, or release map packs." Some rumors regarding a sequel arose due to casting calls for voice actors. On March 10, 2010, Portal 2 was officially announced for a release late in that year; the announcement was preceded by an alternate reality game based on unexpected patches made to Portal that contained cryptic messages in relation to Portal 2's announcement, including an update to the game, creating a different ending for the fate of Chell. The original game left her in a deserted parking lot after destroying GLaDOS, but the update involved Chell being dragged back into the facility by a "Party Escort Bot". Though Portal 2 was originally announced for a Q4 2010 release, the game was released on April 19, 2011.

A modding community has developed around Portal, with users creating their own test chambers and other in-game modifications. The group "We Create Stuff" created an Adobe Flash version of Portal, titled Portal: The Flash Version, just before release of The Orange Box. This flash version was well received by the community and the group has since converted it to a map pack for the published game. Another mod, Portal: Prelude, is an unofficial prequel developed by an independent team of three that focuses on the pre-GLaDOS era of Aperture Science, and contains nineteen additional "crafty and challenging" test chambers. An ASCII version of Portal was created by Joe Larson. An unofficial port of Portal to the iPhone using the Unity game engine was created but only consisted of a single room from the game. Mari0 is a fan-made four-player coop mashup of the original Super Mario Bros. and Portal.

An unofficial port for the Nintendo 64 console titled Portal 64 was under development by James Lambert. (Note: Attributed to multiple sources:) By September 2023, he had a working copy but still had ways to go to be completely finished. The project was taken down in January 2024 due to a request by Valve; according to Lambert, the port's reliance on "Nintendo's proprietary libraries" was the reason.

=== Film adaptation ===
A film adaptation has been in development hell since 2013, and it was reported on May 25, 2021, that the project is still in development by J.J. Abrams and Bad Robot and the script has been written. As of 2022, J.J. Abrams continued to express interest in bringing Portal to film. In 2026, Kane Parsons also expressed interest in directing a Portal film.
