= List of Bar/None Records artists =

- Current artists: 34
- Former artists: 95

New Jersey's largest record label, Bar/None Records, began in 1986 by releasing albums from artists native to the Hoboken region of New Jersey. NPR's radio program World Cafe recognizes Bar/None Records as being "small but influential," in comparison with multinational media groups, listing artists that first recorded with the label before signing with larger record labels, such as Ezra Furman, Freedy Johnston, Yo La Tengo, the Front Bottoms, the Feelies, and They Might Be Giants.

As of 2019, there have been over one-hundred and twenty artists signed to Bar/None Records.

== Artists ==
- Alex Chilton
- Ben Vaughn
- Breakfast in Fur
- Burnside Project
- Darren Jessee
- The dB's
- Drgn King
- Diners
- Elk City
- Emperor X
- Eros and the Eschaton
- The Feelies
- Freedy Johnston
- The Front Bottoms
- Gene D. Plumber
- Glenn Mercer
- Happyness
- Hot Lava
- Hotel Lights
- Justus Proffit
- K. McCarty
- The Micronotz
- The Moms
- of Montreal
- Overlake
- The Paranoid Style
- Pardoner
- Petra Haden
- R. Stevie Moore
- Richard Barone
- Sabina
- Shannon McArdle
- Teen Men
- The Spinto Band
- Yo La Tengo
- Yung Wu

=== Former and inactive artists ===
- Adrian Borland
- Architecture in Helsinki
- Arto Lindsay
- Bill Drummond
- Birdie Busch
- Bob Wiseman
- Brian Dewan
- Bright Little Field
- Brute Force
- Chocolate U.S.A.
- Chris Mars
- Country Dick Montana
- Diego Cortez
- Disco Inferno
- DJ Spooky
- Drink Me
- Edwyn Collins
- The Embarrassment
- Epic Soundtracks
- Esquivel
- Eszter Balint
- Evan Dando
- Ezra Furman
- The Glands
- Glass Eye
- Greenhouse 27
- Greg Camp
- Hannah Marcus
- Health and Happiness Show
- Hotel Lights
- Human Switchboard
- The Individuals
- Jack Skuller
- Jenifer Jackson
- John Southworth
- The Joy Project
- Joy Zipper
- Juliana Hatfield
- Kate Jacobs
- Langley Schools Music Project
- Lonesome Val
- Luka Bloom
- Lullaby for the Working Class
- Mad Happy
- Mary Lee's Corvette
- Mason Jennings
- Mayday
- The Mendoza Line
- Mensclub
- Michael Hearst
- Michael Shelley
- Mono Puff
- Mosquitos
- Ms Lum
- Noonday Underground
- Oppenheimer
- The Ordinaries
- The Original Sins
- Otis Ball
- Parlour Tricks
- Peter Holsapple and Chris Stamey
- Phillips and Driver
- Poi Dog Pondering
- Professor and Maryann
- Puffy Amiyumi
- Rage to Live
- Ralph's World
- Raybeats
- Richard Hawley
- R. Stevie Moore & Jason Falkner
- The Scene is Now
- The Sharp Things
- Shirk Circus
- Shrimp Boat
- The Slip
- Songs from a Random House
- Speed the Plough
- Standard Fare
- Starling Electric
- Stuart Moxham
- Swales
- Swimming Pool Qs
- 10,000 Maniacs
- They Might Be Giants
- Tindersticks
- Touch of Oliver
- Trachtenburg Family Slideshow Players
- Trembling Blue Stars
- Vinicius Cantuária
- Wallmen
- White Mud Freeway
- Almost You
- American Song-Poem
- Lotus Lounge
- Red Hot and Lisbon
