= Brian Doherty (drummer) =

American drummer, songwriter, and podcaster

- Born: Brooklyn, New York City, U.S.
- Origin: Randolph, New Jersey
- Genres: Alternative rock; indie rock; jazz; new wave
- Occupations: Musician, composer, record producer, educator
- Instrument: Drums
- Years active: 1981–present
- Label: Various
- Website: briandohertydrummer.blogspot.com

Brian Doherty is an American drummer, singer-songwriter, composer, music producer, educator, and podcaster based in New York City. After starting his career working with various jazz musicians, he worked with rock bands and artists such as The Silos, Freedy Johnston, They Might Be Giants, Ben Folds, and XTC. He has also contributed to movie soundtracks. In 2000, he became a music teacher, as part of the New York City Teaching Fellows program. He has released two albums of drum tracks for songwriters in a series called Keep It Simple, and in 2012 he released his debut solo project, Treat + Release. As of 2024, he is working on writing his memoirs, and recording podcasts.

== Early life ==
Doherty was born in Brooklyn, New York. His mother and father listened to classical music and opera when he grew up.

Where he grew up in Randolph, New Jersey, southern rock bands were gaining popularity, and early on he listened avidly to bands such as the Outlaws, Lynyrd Skynyrd, and Led Zeppelin. Doherty cites the fact that southern rock bands such as the Outlaws and The Allman Brothers Band had two drummers as a significant influence on him; he himself began playing drums at the age of seven. Doherty went on to play drums in his high school marching band, percussion ensemble, and a number of garage rock bands.

While he was in high school, his ambition was to attend the Manhattan School of Music for its "groundbreaking percussion program" that was taught by Paul Price; starting in 1978 his parents sent him on Saturdays for a preparatory theatre program that accepted high school students. These experiences helped Doherty to build up a network of musicians, and friends he made there introduced him to the work of Frank Zappa, and numerous session drummers in Los Angeles in the 1960s.

As other high school students who attended the preparatory Saturday program went on to become doctors and lawyers, Doherty started living in New York City and stayed with the Manhattan School of Music. He started attending as a college student in 1980 for both his undergraduate and graduate degree, studying under musicians such as Paul Price and Fred Hinger. His experience learning drums in an orchestral setting rather than the rock setting that he grew up with, as well as studying the music of avant-garde composers such as Igor Stravinsky, Arnold Schoenberg, and Edgard Varèse, broadened his horizons. Doherty likens this experience to being "the rock and roll kid coming to the other side".

Doherty graduated from the Manhattan School of Music in 1985 with a Master of Music degree.

== Career ==
=== Early years ===
As he was just graduating college, Doherty played in a "pickup band of youngsters" called Second Nature which he now deems inconsequential; he also played with the Bob Baldwin/Al Orlo Project featuring James Robinson. What Doherty considers more important is his time playing with established and renowned jazz artists, such as Noel Pointer, Jonathan Butler, and Lonnie Liston Smith. Specifically, he considers Lonnie Liston Smith as very supportive and encouraging in being able to "play simply" and to "serve the music"; and in general, his experience playing with jazz musicians was also a way for Doherty to build up a network of musicians and collaborators.

In 1988, Doherty joined the faculty at NYC's Drummers Collective (now known as The Collective Global Vision), after having been a student there and having learned some valuable skills there during college. He remained with the Collective for thirteen years, teaching private drum lessons primarily to novice drummers.

=== The Silos ===
After Doherty started off performing with jazz artists, he started playing with singer-songwriters. In 1990, Doherty was performing in a backing band with Richard Ford, a bassist from England residing in New Jersey at the time. After one performance, Ford informed Doherty that The Silos, a New York rock band that were already established at this point, were seeking out a new bassist and drummer. Ford wasn't too familiar with The Silos but knew their manager, but he encouraged Doherty to attend the rehearsal with him.

Doherty and Ford became members of The Silos, and first contributed to their 1990 self-titled album, which peaked at #141 on the US Billboard 200 chart. Founding member Walter Salas-Humara quit the band following the release of The Silos, and relocated to Los Angeles, but Doherty stayed with The Silos for some years after that. Doherty's contributions can be heard on the albums Hasta La Victoria (1992), Susan Across The Ocean (1994), and the compilation Long Green Boat (1997).

When he was a member of The Silos, Doherty felt that "we could be so much better than what we really are". He felt that The Silos were strongest when performing live, and that their studio recordings didn't reflect that as well.

=== Freedy Johnston ===
Freedy Johnston released his first studio album The Trouble Tree in 1990 through Bar/None Records; it received generally favorable coverage upon its release, and Doherty enjoyed it. Johnston toured with The Silos as their opening act while Doherty was a member; Johnston and The Silos had the same tour manager, Mark Zoltak. At this point Ford left, but Graham Maby, at that point well known for playing with Joe Jackson, had replaced him. At one point, Johnston asked Doherty and Maby if they were interested in joining his backing band. They did, and Doherty remembers the experience working with Johnston being "1000%" more enjoyable than touring with The Silos. Doherty admired Johnston's songwriting and lyricism, and he felt that Johnston "does not shy away from playing electric guitar", in the sense that other singer-songwriters "minimize the sort of rock aspect of their music".

Doherty had a significant role in Johnston's second album Can You Fly (1992), as did Maby, who co-produced it with Knut Bohn. Doherty was especially satisfied because his drum tracks were "front and center" and were very prominent in the mix, and he also liked the fact that the songs that Graham Maby produced and the songs that Knut Bohn produced were different.

To this day, Johnston and Doherty maintain contact, and Johnston regularly sends Doherty demos of songs in progress.

=== They Might Be Giants and Ben Folds ===
Freedy Johnston switched managers from Mark Zoltak to Jamie Lincoln Kitman, who was the manager of alternative rock band They Might Be Giants, who were well-established by this point, and were making a significant shift in their live performances, from using prerecorded backing tracks to forming a backing band. Doherty joined They Might Be Giants in 1993, and he was their second live drummer following Jonathan Feinberg, and their first studio drummer.

Meanwhile, Zoltak was approached by a music publicist to establish a connection with Ben Folds, a singer-songwriter who was just starting out at this point. Folds had relocated from North Carolina to Montclair, New Jersey; by this point Zoltak was based in Hoboken, and Doherty was based in Jersey City. Zoltak had listened to Folds' demos and was impressed; Zoltak immediately turned to Doherty and had him listen to the demos. On July 10, 1993, Doherty invited Folds to a They Might Be Giants concert at the Bearsville Theatre in Bearsville, New York, where they met, and Folds gave Doherty a cassette tape of more demos. Folds, Doherty, and bassist Tom Spagnardi came together to form the Ben Folds Five. Folds was set on the name of his band being the Ben Folds Five even though there were three members, because "it sounds better than Ben Folds Three", but Doherty remembers approaching him with Spagnardi and saying, "Dude, we're a trio!" The Ben Folds Five rehearsed in Folds' apartment in Montclair, and at the basement of Doherty's house in Jersey City, where he had a home studio with a 4-track recorder; they played some industry showcases, hoping a record executive would give Folds a deal. The lineup (piano, bass, and drums), coupled with Ben Folds' more casual image, and the intense vocal harmonies, were very unusual at the time, and they were often met with mixed reception. Doherty's final show with Folds was at a club called Sin-é, and a talent manager in the audience approached Folds, immediately offering to seek out a record deal, and Folds moved back to North Carolina; Doherty fell away from Folds' career after this.

For three years, Doherty recorded several albums for TMBG, and toured internationally with them. His first release with the band was for their 1993 EP Why Does the Sun Shine?. From November 1993 to June 1994, They Might Be Giants recorded extensively at Bearsville Sound Studio; those recordings resulted in the Back to Skull EP, and TMBG's 5th studio album, John Henry (1994). John Henry was their first album to utilize a full band arrangement, rather than synthesized and programmed backing tracks. The album's name, a reference to the man versus machine fable of John Henry, is an allusion to the band's fundamental switch to more conventional instrumentation, especially the newly established use of a human drummer instead of a drum machine. The song "AKA Driver" from the album was co-written by their current lineup at the time: John Flansburgh, John Linnell, Brian Doherty, and Tony Maimone.

In 1994, Doherty contributed on 2 songs on a solo EP that John Linnell had recorded called State Songs, released through John Flansburgh's side project Hello CD of the Month Club, for June 1994. That EP was later expanded and released as a full album of the same name in 1999. The album spent four weeks on the CMJ 200 chart, peaking at #18.

By February 1996, the lineup had changed; Graham Maby replaced Tony Maimone on bass full-time, and Eric Schermerhorn joined as a guitarist. They wrote new material which they were performing during their weekly stint at the Mercury Lounge in New York City; many of the songs that were being played there were fleshed out in studios, and released as They Might Be Giants' 6th studio album, Factory Showroom (1996). In early 1997, Doherty left They Might Be Giants, mainly for personal reasons, but also due to financial reasons.

Archival TMBG recordings with Brian Doherty on drums appear on their 1998 live album Severe Tire Damage, and on the 1999 album Long Tall Weekend.

=== Session musician ===
After leaving They Might Be Giants, Doherty went on to work with many groups and artists, including one single session for XTC. This session resulted in the song "Cherry In Your Tree", which was released as a one-off on the compilation soundtrack album Carmen Sandiego: Out Of This World, in 1994.

He also worked with M2M, Frank Black of The Pixies, Twyla Tharp, Freedy Johnston, Christy Thompson, Madder Rose, Simone Hardy, Chip Taylor, John Platania, Sol Seppy, Guy Davis, Gary Lucas, Haruko Nara, and Jon Langford of The Mekons, Chip Taylor, John Platania, Jon Langford, Guy Davis, P.J. Pacifico, and Sol Seppy. Doherty has also produced a number of recordings, including Ms. Lum's Airport Love Song.

In 2000, Doherty went back to graduate school at the City College of New York. After earning a Master's degree in Elementary Education, he became a classroom teacher as part of the New York City Teaching Fellows program, teaching music in the South Bronx. In addition to being a full-time music teacher, from 2000 to 2020, Doherty has also remained active as a drummer playing private events and Broadway shows. He worked on the Broadway productions of RENT, Hairspray, Little Shop of Horrors, and Waitress. He also drummed in the debut of the Broadway show The Times They Are A-Changin' in October 2006 at the Brooks Atkinson Theater in New York City.

=== Keep It Simple series ===
Without being privy to the loops already made available through Logic and GarageBand, Doherty started recording solo drum tracks meant for musicians to record over, novice drummers to practice with, or DJs to sample and remix. Doherty released these as a series of royalty-free albums called Keep It Simple. Keep It Simple, Volume 1 was released in December 2010, and Volume 2 was released in early 2011, with each of the tracks around three minutes and "performed by Doherty in a single take," without any editing or digital enhancement. Volume 3 was expected to be released on October 15, 2012, but Doherty does not remember actually releasing a third installment.

According to Doherty, the tracks are largely intended to provide an organic drum line for producers and songwriters. He has stated that "most loops [on the market] are only short segments and are sometimes too...complex to be truly helpful. I wanted to create a collection of drum tracks similar to what you might expect from drummers like Mick Fleetwood or Jeff Porcaro, while remaining faithful to my style and musical instincts."

Keep It Simple wasn't as successful as Doherty hoped it would be, and with many digital audio workstations already coming prepackaged with recorded drum loops, it was somewhat obsolete; Doherty did receive some positive feedback on the albums.

=== Treat + Release ===
"I'll Keep the Rest"
Excerpt of Doherty's single, "I'll Keep the Rest" released on Treat + Release

"Everyone Rocks"
Excerpt of "Everyone Rocks" on Treat + Release

While he was working with They Might Be Giants in the 1990s, Doherty started writing songs on his own, seeing that as a way to progress as a musician. He approached fellow musicians for songwriting advice and to co-write songs with him, such as Graham Maby; with Maby, he also recorded some demos. Other people he approached were confused that a drummer would be writing songs, so Doherty ended up writing most of the material on his own in his home studio in Jersey City. At one point, Doherty also approached John Flansburgh, who gave him a "lukewarm" response when approached to collaborate in some capacity; Doherty likened this to "the adult patting the child on the head ... 'Aw, isn't that cute, Brian's writing songs'."

Doherty did involve Tony Maimone, and in 1996 they collaborated extensively at Maimone's own home studio (which later became Studio G in Williamsburg, Brooklyn). Doherty was somewhat frustrated that Maimone was getting increasingly busier over time, and Doherty just wanted to record his songs, so at a certain point Doherty stopped involving Maimone, and replaced some of his contributions with those of guitarist Todd Novak and bassist John Yates, also session musicians, and producer Steve Light; the songs were finished by 1998. Because his contributions were replaced, Doherty and Maimone had a minor falling out. Maimone felt slighted and that this was their collaborative project; Doherty saw it as his own project, but he had taken some songs to Maimone to work on collaboratively.

Though this album was all but complete by 1998, it took 14 years for it to be released through CD Baby in 2012. He released it as a self-titled album under the name Treat + Release because he didn't want to use his own name.

In October 2012, Doherty was the subject of a short film directed by Lou Guarneri, a student filmmaker of Pace University, titled Who The F*** is Brian Doherty, which looked at his career in the music industry and future plans. He thought the film "didn't turn out good", the film was not successful, and he now deems this film inconsequential; the film cannot be easily found online.

=== Memoirs and podcasts ===
Brian Doherty has been writing his memoirs, working on his book on and off since 2011, tentatively titled Memoirs of a Rock Drummer. He wrote an outline and a first draft, and posted it online, but he stopped working on it for a while. He picked it up again, and is still writing it.

Jordan Cooper and Dave Fox, hosts of a podcast about They Might Be Giants called Don't Let's Start, approached Doherty for an interview, and he agreed. They came to his house in June 2019, and a tentative contents page for his memoirs in progress formed the basis of their conversation. Cooper and Fox conducted more interviews with Doherty after the fact, and his episodes were released in February 2020.

In January 2020, Greg Simpson, host of another podcast about They Might Be Giants called This Might Be A Podcast, also approached Doherty for an interview. Doherty first appeared on the episode for the Factory Showroom song "The Bells Are Ringing", released in February 2020, and he appeared with Tony Maimone on the episode for "AKA Driver", released in August 2021.

During the COVID-19 pandemic, Doherty started his own podcast called Friends and Music with Brian Doherty in July 2020, which is very casual in nature. Through this podcast, he has interviewed his former bandmates and fellow musicians such as Tony Maimone, Steve Sabet, Freedy Johnston, Graham Maby, and Eric Schermerhorn. Doherty also got the opportunity to interview Stephan Galfas, who worked for Warner Bros. and produced a band called The Good Rats, and which Doherty felt deserved more recognition as the Good Rats had inspired more well-known heavy metal bands such as Twisted Sister and Ratt.

In January 2024, Doherty appeared on Working Drummer; a fan recommended him to the host of that podcast a long time before it was recorded.

=== Sabet and Doherty ===
Doherty has been involved in a collaborative musical project with a friend who is also a teacher, Steven Sabet. Doherty had purchased Logic Pro in 2017, and became motivated to record more music; Sabet was the person he collaborated with most, and in 2018 they started recording together, under the name Sabet and Doherty. Sabet and Doherty both co-wrote the songs, and Doherty handled the lyrics on his own. At the onset, Doherty and Sabet considered their songwriting and recording a productive "workshop" experience, and after editing and remixing, they decided their songs should be released commercially. They released two EPs: a self-titled EP was released on March 20, 2020, and an EP called The Secret was released on January 24, 2023. Ultimately, Doherty and Sabet were satisfied and proud of their work.

== Influences ==
As a drummer, Doherty cites Hal Blaine, Ian Paice, John Bonham, Buddy Rich, and Jim Gordon as significant influences.

== Personal life ==
Doherty currently resides in Westchester County, New York with his wife and three children.

== Discography ==
=== Solo albums ===
List of studio albums by Brian Doherty
Year	Album title	Release details
2012	Treat + Release (by Treat + Release)	Released: 2012; Label: Brian Doherty; Format: CD, digital

Keep it Simple drum track series

- 2010: Keep it Simple Volume 1
- 2011: Keep it Simple Volume 2

=== Collaborations ===
==== With The Silos ====
- 1990: The Silos
- 1993: Hasta La Victoria!
- 1994: Susan Across the Ocean
- 1997: Long Green Boat

==== With They Might Be Giants ====
- 1993: Why Does the Sun Shine? (EP)
- 1994: Back to Skull (EP)
- 1994: John Henry
- 1996: Factory Showroom
- 1998: Severe Tire Damage
- 1999: Long Tall Weekend
- 2002: Dial-A-Song: 20 Years of They Might Be Giants (compilation)
- 2005: A User's Guide to They Might Be Giants (compilation)
- 2005: They Got Lost (compilation)

=== Production/performance credits ===
Year	Release title	Primary artist(s)	Notes, role
1981	Just Another Asshole#5	Just Another Asshole	Primary artist/performer on "[Untitled Track]"
1988	Verse-ability	Helen Hooke	Drums
1992	Can You Fly	Freedy Johnston	Drums
1993	06:21:03:11 Up Evil	Front 242	Composer
1993	Bring It Down	Madder Rose	Drums
1993	Unlucky	Freedy Johnston	Drums
1993	"Airport Love Song"	Ms. Lum	Percussion, producer, vocals
1994	Carmen Sandiego: Out of This World	Flight Records	Drums, glockenspiel
1994	Insurgent Country, Vol. 1: For a Life of Sin	Bloodshot Records	Drums, background vocals
1995	A Testimonial Dinner: The Songs of XTC	Thirsty Ear Records	Drums
1995	Mighty Morphin Power Rangers The Movie: Original Soundtrack Album	Atlantic Records	Drums
1996	Ride	Orleans	Drums
1997	Galway to Graceland	Kevin L. Evans	Bass, acoustic guitar, vocals, primary artist
1997	Miracle School	George Usher	Drums
1998	James Brown Super Bad @ 65	Frank Black, etc.	Drums
1999	Old Friends	John McDermott	Research
1999	State Songs	John Linnell	Drums
2000	All Natural Lemon & Lime Flavors	Straight Blue Line	Drums
2000	The London Sessions Bootleg	Chip Taylor	Drums
2001	All Natural Lemon & Lime Flavors	All Natural Lemon & Lime Flavors	Vocals, production, composer
2001	The Very Thing You Treasure	Spike Priggen	Drums, tambourine
2001	Jagged Junction	Jett Brando	Drums, piano
2002	Making Singles, Drinking Doubles	Bloodshot Records	Drums
2002	My Favorite Things	Haruko Nara	Drums
2002	Lucky Dog	John Platania	Drums
2004	All the Fame of Lofty Deeds	Jon Langford	Drums
2005	Stars After Stars After Stars	Spike Priggen	Drums
2005	Stand-ins for deciBels: A Tribute to the dB's	Paisley Pop Records	Drums
2006	There's No Sound In Flutes!	Spike Priggen	Drums
2006	The Bells of 1 2	Sol Seppy	Drums
2007	Blues, Waltzes and Badland Borders	John Platania	Drums
2007	Bock & Blu Christmas	Bock & Blu	Drums
2009	Sweetheart Like You	Guy Davis	Drums
2010	"American Princess"	Kristy Kay	Drums
2010	Christy Thompson EP	Christy Thompson	Drums
2011	"I Fear"	Gang Green	Production
2011	Outlet	P. J. Pacifico	Drums
