= Rain on the City =

Studio album by Freedy Johnston
- Released: January 12, 2010
- Recorded: House of David, Nashville
- Genre: Alternative rock
- Length: 41:03
- Label: Bar/None
- Producer: Richard McLaurin

Freedy Johnston chronology
My Favorite Waste of Time (2007)	Rain on the City (2010)	Neon Repairman (2015)

Rain on the City is the eighth studio album by singer-songwriter Freedy Johnston. It was released in 2010 on Bar/None Records. It is Johnston's first album of original material since 2001's Right Between the Promises.

== Reception ==
Professional ratings
Aggregate scores
Source	Rating
Metacritic	79/100
Review scores
Source	Rating
AllMusic	4/5 stars
Robert Christgau	(1-star Honorable Mention)
Entertainment Weekly	B+
Pitchfork Media	6.7/10
PopMatters	7/10 stars

AllMusic's Mark Deming said that the album "strikes a more comfortable balance between the bright and blue sides of Johnston's musical personality, and in terms of getting a sound that suits his songs, this is his most effective set since This Perfect World in 1994." He continues that "Johnston also seems to have gotten his stride back as a songwriter, and these 11 tunes are full of the sharp but thoughtful wordplay and unique characters that make his best work so pleasurable." And concludes "this collection is a beautiful example of Johnston playing to his strengths and reminding us why he's one of the best and most singular American songwriters at work today. With any luck, it won't take quite so long for him to make something this comfortable but pleasantly surprising again."

== Track listing ==
All songs written by Freedy Johnston.

1. "Lonely Penny" – 3:48
2. "Don't Fall in Love with a Lonely Girl" – 4:08
3. "Rain on the City" – 5:24
4. "Venus Is Her Name" – 3:04
5. "The Other Side of Love" – 3:06
6. "The Devil Raises His Own" – 4:51
7. "Livin' Too Close to the Rio Grande" – 3:08
8. "Central Station" – 2:59
9. "The Kind of Love We're In" – 3:54
10. "It's Gonna Come Back to You" – 2:41
11. "What You Cannot See, You Cannot Fight" – 4:00

== Personnel ==
- Freedy Johnston – vocals, guitar, ukulele
- Richard McLaurin – acoustic and electric guitar, lap steel, pedal steel, bass, piano, rhodes, percussion, accordion, mandolin, background vocals
- Rich Malloy – drums
- Pete Abbott – drums, percussion, piano, rhodes
- David Santos – bass
- Billy Mercer – bass
- Bryn Davies – bass
- Joe McMahan – acoustic and electric guitar, pedal steel
- David Briggs – wurlitzer
- Steve Conn – accordion, B3
- John Lancaster – piano, B3
- Steve Herman – flugel horn
- Chris Carmichael – strings
- Jason Eskridge – background vocals
- Daniel Tashian – background vocals
- Kate York – background vocals
