= My Favorite Waste of Time (album) =

Studio album by Freedy Johnston
- Released: 2007
- Recorded: Various
- Genre: Alternative
- Label: Bar/None Records

Freedy Johnston chronology
Live at McCabe's Guitar Shop (2006)	My Favorite Waste of Time (2007)	Rain on the City (2010)

My Favorite Waste of Time is singer-songwriter Freedy Johnston's 2007 release. It consists of cover versions of songs by other artists.

== Track listing ==
1. "You're My Favorite Waste of Time" by Marshall Crenshaw
2. "I Want You Bad" by NRBQ (Adams, Crandon)
3. "Do You Know the Way to San José" (Burt Bacharach, Hal David), made popular by Dionne Warwick
4. "The Sad Café" by the Eagles (Frey, Henley, Souther, Walsh)
5. "I've Been Waiting" by Matthew Sweet
6. "Listen to What the Man Said" by Wings (Paul McCartney)
7. "Let 'Em In" by Paul McCartney & Wings (Paul McCartney, Linda McCartney)
8. "Shadow of a Doubt (A Complex Kid)" by Tom Petty and the Heartbreakers (Tom Petty)
9. "Bus Stop" by the Hollies (Graham Gouldman)
10. "Night and Day" by Cole Porter
