= Big Soul =

Studio album by the Original Sins
- Released: 1987
- Genre: Garage punk
- Length: 39:36 (vinyl edition); 56:43 (CD edition)
- Label: Bar/None
- Producer: Glenn Morrow

The Original Sins chronology
Big Soul (1987)	The Hardest Way (1989)

Professional ratings
Review scores
Source	Rating
AllMusic	4.5/5 stars

Big Soul is the debut album by American garage punk band the Original Sins, released in 1987 through Bar/None Records on vinyl format. The record was reissued in 1994 on CD format, which included bonus tracks, an alternative track listing, and different artwork.

== Track listing ==
All songs written by John Terlesky

Side one
No.	Title	Length
1.	"Not Gonna Be All Right"	3:13
2.	"Can't Feel a Thing"	3:25
3.	"Possession"	3:22
4.	"All in My Head"	3:40
5.	"Your Way"	3:40
6.	"My Mother's Mirror"	2:24

Side two
No.	Title	Length
1.	"Help Yourself"	2:42
2.	"Read Your Mind"	3:12
3.	"Why Don't You Smile, Joan?"	2:54
4.	"Inside/Out"	4:14
5.	"Big Soul"	3:23
6.	"I Want to Live"	3:17

CD Version
No.	Title	Length
1.	"Just 14"	3:52
2.	"Not Gonna Be All Right"	3:13
3.	"Can't Feel a Thing"	3:25
4.	"Possession"	3:22
5.	"All in My Head"	3:40
6.	"Your Way"	3:40
7.	"My Mother's Mirror"	2:24
8.	"Road to Emmaus"	2:13
9.	"The Party's Over Now"	3:01
10.	"Help Yourself"	2:42
11.	"Read Your Mind"	3:12
12.	"Why Don't You Smile, Joan?"	2:54
13.	"Inside/Out"	4:14
14.	"Big Soul"	3:23
15.	"I Want to Live"	3:17
16.	"Sugar, Sugar"	3:39
17.	"Route 66"	1:27
18.	"The Timekeeper"	2:55

== Personnel ==
The Original Sins

- Ken Bussiere – bass guitar, backing vocals
- Dave Ferrara – drums, backing vocals
- Dan McKinney – keyboards
- John Terlesky – vocals, guitar, mixing

Additional musicians and production

- Lee Dick – assistant engineering
- E.V.I. – design
- James MacMillan – engineering, mixing
- Glenn Morrow – production, mixing
- Bico Stupakoff – photography
