= Move (The Original Sins album) =

Studio album by the Original Sins
- Released: February 21, 1992
- Studio: John Keane, Athens, GA
- Genre: Garage punk, garage rock
- Length: 70:30
- Label: Psonik
- Producer: Peter Buck, John Keane

The Original Sins chronology
Self Destruct (1990)	Move (1992)	Out There (1992)

Move is the fourth studio album by garage rock band the Original Sins, released in 1992 through Psonik Records. The album was intended to be a break into mainstream music for the band, but the record sold poorly among its initial release. The album's production duties were credited to Peter Buck, guitarist with R.E.M., but most of the production was actually done by John Keane.

After the album's release, Dave Ferrarra left the group, who would not come back until the release of Suburban Primitive. He would be replaced with drummer Seth Baer.

== Critical reception ==
Professional ratings
Review scores
Source	Rating
AllMusic	2/5 stars

The Los Angeles Times called the album a "sparkling 24-song marathon ... that ranges more widely through ‘60s sources," writing that "none of these borrowings sounds stale, because of the sheer vigor and immediacy the band is able to bring to familiar styles." Trouser Press wrote that "in a masterful display of greatness, the two-dozen three-minute tracks (all J.T. originals!) vary the emotional and stylistic temperature more than ever."

== Track listing ==
All tracks are written by John Telersky.

No.	Title	Length
1.	"She's on My Side"	2:13
2.	"Wake Up"	3:39
3.	"Watch You Dance"	3:01
4.	"I Surrender"	3:02
5.	"Talking to You"	2:56
6.	"Like an Animal"	3:22
7.	"Move"	4:16
8.	"Saturday"	3:00
9.	"All Good Things"	3:43
10.	"Feel So Fine"	2:20
11.	"Getting the Feeling"	2:50
12.	"Forest for the Trees"	2:04
13.	"I'll Be Around"	2:33
14.	"Waiting"	3:25
15.	"Between the Lines"	2:29
16.	"If I Knew"	2:46
17.	"Closing My Eyes"	2:30
18.	"I Never Dreamed"	2:49
19.	"Break the Chain"	2:29
20.	"Hit or Miss"	2:38
21.	"Nothing's Everything"	2:10
22.	"It's a Good Life"	3:49
23.	"Not Today"	2:30
24.	"Devil's Music"	4:04

== Personnel ==
The Original Sins

- John Terlesky – Vocals, guitar, cover art
- Ken Bussiere – Bass
- Dan McKinney – Organ
- Dave Ferrara – Drums

Production

- John Keane – Engineering, production
- Peter Buck – Production
- Pat Dillette – Engineering
- Michael Sarsfeild – Mastering
- Pete Ciccone – Layout
