= Bethlehem (The Original Sins album) =

Studio album by the Original Sins
- Released: October 15, 1996
- Genre: Psychedelic rock, pop music, indie rock, garage rock
- Length: 45:56
- Label: Bar/None
- Producer: Ray Ketchem

The Original Sins chronology
Turn You On (1995)	Bethlehem (1996)	Suburban Primitive (1997)

Bethlehem is the eighth studio album by garage rock band the Original Sins, released in 1996 through Bar/None Records. The album shows a change in tone for the band, focusing much more on pop music and psychedelic rock than the energetic garage punk fury from previous releases. The album has been considered as the band's best, with some describing it as "the band's greatest achievement" and a "great leap-forward".

== Track listing ==
All tracks are written by John Terlesky.

No.	Title	Length
1.	"Bethlehem"	1:35
2.	"Wish I Was Here"	3:50
3.	"Shopping Trip to Mercury"	3:42
4.	"Let's Do It Slow"	3:26
5.	"My Struggles"	3:58
6.	"Souls on Ice"	3:11
7.	"One Way Out"	4:50
8.	"Beautiful Day"	4:30
9.	"Happy Birthday, Jesus"	1:38
10.	"Hang Me"	2:09
11.	"Cold Cold World"	3:22
12.	"Sunday Nights"	4:53
13.	"I Wonder"	4:52

== Personnel ==
=== Performers ===
- John Terlesky - Vocals, guitar, percussion
- Ken Bussiere - Bass
- Dave McKinney - Organ, piano
- Seth Baer - Drums
- Maria Stoiancheff - Backing vocals
- Josh Silverman - Acoustic guitar ("Beautiful Day"), guitar ("Sunday Nights")
- Ray Ketchum - Backing vocals, percussion (""One Way Out")
- Reneé LaBue - Handclaps

=== Production ===
- Elizabeth Van Itallie - Design
- Ray Ketchum - Production
- Dan Delong - Photography
- John Terlesky - Photography
