= This Perfect World (song) =

Single by Freedy Johnston

from the album This Perfect World
- Released: 1994
- Genre: Alternative
- Length: 4:35
- Label: Elektra
- Songwriter: Freedy Johnston
- Producer: Butch Vig

This Perfect World is a song by singer-songwriter Freedy Johnston from his 1994 album of the same name. It concerns a man who has evidently done something horrible confronting a person from his past. The music adds emotional sophistication to the lyrics by shifting between dark, gloomy verses in C-Sharp Minor and a bright, soothing chorus in E Major. The chorus adds an ironic quality to the song by singing about "this perfect world" between each depressing verse. The song has been well received by critics, who laud it as one of Johnston's best. "Best of all [the songs on the album] is the mournful, eerie title track, which describes the possibly mortal sins of one man's past and the hopelessness of his future with the economy and punch of a good short story."

The song was also featured in the 1996 movie, Kingpin, in the somber scene where character Roy Munson, played by Woody Harrelson, returns to his childhood home after 17 years, only to see that, like his own life, his hometown has become older and dilapidated.
