= Boss of Me =

2001 single by They Might Be Giants

Single by They Might Be Giants

from the album Mink Car and Music from Malcolm in the Middle
- B-side: "Reprehensible"
- Released: January 8, 2001
- Genre: Alternative rock; ska punk
- Length: 2:56
- Label: Restless; Fox Music
- Songwriters: John Flansburgh; John Linnell
- Producers: Pat Dillett; John Flansburgh; John Linnell

They Might Be Giants singles chronology
"Doctor Worm" (1998)	"Boss of Me" (2001)	"Man, It's So Loud in Here" (2001)

Audio sample
- file; help

"Boss of Me" is a song by American alternative rock band They Might Be Giants. It is best known as the opening theme for the television sitcom Malcolm in the Middle (2000–2006) and was released as a single from the show's soundtrack in January 2001. The song entered the top 30 in Australia and the United Kingdom, while in the United States it peaked within the top 50 on two Radio & Records charts.

In 2002, the song earned the band their first Grammy Award, winning Best Song Written for a Motion Picture, Television or Other Visual Media. It became one of the band's most commercially successful and widely recognized songs. An earlier version of the track featured the chorus "Who’s gonna guess the dead guy in the envelope" and was written for a contest presented by the Preston & Steve radio show during their tenure at Y100.

== Background ==
When Flansburgh and Linnell were asked to write the theme song for Fox's new pilot about three boys, Flansburgh thought of the half-finished "Boss of Me" with its high energy level. The show's creator, Linwood Boomer, helped persuade his network colleagues to choose the song, and also contributed the lyric "Life is unfair".

== Composition ==
"Boss of Me" is an alternative rock and ska punk song, with a length of two minutes and fifty-six seconds. Flansburgh's vocals range from the key of D4 to E5. The song is in the key of G major and is set in common time, it runs at a tempo of 104 beats per minute.

== Release ==
"Boss of Me" was released commercially in the United Kingdom, Australia and mainland Europe. Mainland Europe was given a separate release from the British release, which had different cover artwork and a different track listing. The single was marketed as the single from the soundtrack album, Music from Malcolm in the Middle, but the B-sides to all releases were tracks from They Might Be Giants albums, as opposed to being other tracks from the soundtrack album. "Reprehensible" comes from the band's 1999 internet-only album, Long Tall Weekend. "Mr. Xcitement" went on to be included on their album Mink Car, released two months after the single. "Boss of Me" charted in three countries, reaching number 21 in the UK, number 89 in the Netherlands, and number 29 on the Australian Singles Chart. It also reached the top 50 on two US Radio & Records charts: the Alternative Top 50 (number 48) and the CHR/Pop Top 50 (number 50).

== Music video ==
The "Boss of Me" music video was directed by Ted Crittenden. It is based on Malcolm in the Middle, and contains the characters and set from the show. It begins with Dewey going through a dumpster that says "TMBG Toys". He climbs out of the dumpster and rides his bike home while dragging the box full of toys. The band is performing inside the box. The box goes into Dewey's backyard where Malcolm is raking leaves, their father, Hal, is cooking on a barbecue grill, and Reese is using hedge clippers on a tree. Dewey opens the box, revealing toy versions of TMBG. But whenever there's a close-up in the box, it is the real band in miniature. A Hawaiian hula dancer toy joins TMBG as Dewey sways back and forth with her. Malcolm and Reese begin shooting the toys with paintball guns until one of them accidentally shoots Hal. Though not shown, it's presumed to have been Reese who shot him as he is later seen using a weed whacker. The John Flansburgh toy is lying in the grass with his arm detached. Reese spots him and, while using the weed whacker, launches him onto the grill where Hal accidentally eats him, much to Dewey's shock. Later, the John Linnell toy is placed in a model airplane that is launched across the street before curving back and landing on the driveway. As Hal drives up, he picks up the airplane to examine it. The plane explodes because it still had a lit fuse. Hal then angrily gathers the TMBG toys into the box and drives back to the dumpster where he promptly tosses it back in.

== Personnel ==
Personnel are adapted from MusicBrainz.

- John Flansburgh – lead vocals and electric guitar
- John Linnell – backing vocals and keyboard
- Danny Weinkauf – bass
- Dan Hickey – drums
- Dan Miller – electric guitar
- Dan Levine – trombone
- Jim O'Connor – trumpet
- Pat Dillett – production
- They Might Be Giants – production
- Bob Clearmountain – mixing

== Charts ==
Chart (2001)	Peak position
Australia (ARIA)	29
Netherlands (Single Top 100)	89
UK Singles (OCC)	21
US Alternative Top 50 (Radio & Records)	48
US CHR/Pop Top 50 (Radio & Records)	50

== Release history ==
Region	Date	Format(s)	Label(s)	Ref.
United States	January 8, 2001	Radio	Restless; Fox Music	
United Kingdom	July 16, 2001	CD; cassette	Restless; PIAS; Fox Music	
Australia	July 30, 2001	CD	Shock; Restless; Fox Music	
