= Elegant Too =

American record production duo

Elegant Too is an American record production and film and television composer duo based in New York. The duo consists of Chris Maxwell and Phil Hernandez. Maxwell was previously a member of the New York band Skeleton Key. Some of their notable collaborations include TV shows Bob's Burgers, Inside Amy Schumer, and the film Scare Me, which premiered at the 2020 Sundance Film Festival.

== Career ==
Elegant Too are the composers for Bob's Burgers, for which they write numerous songs featured on the show. Elegant Too's work is regularly included on episodes of Bob's Burgers. This duo also wrote the music for Comedy Central's Inside Amy Schumer parody "Milk Milk Lemonade", which was on season 3, episode 1 "Last F... Able Day". They have composed music for other TV shows including the Emmy and Peabody award-winning ESPN series "30 for 30", "Anthony Bourdain's No Reservations", "John Oliver's New York Stand Up Show", "Malcolm in the Middle", "Walk The Prank", "Dice", "Important Things with Demetri Martin", "The Whitest Kids U' Know".

In addition to their work in TV, Elegant Too have scored the horror film "Scare Me" which premiered at the 2020 Sundance Film Festival. Other films scored include "For They Know Not What They Do", which premiered at the Tribeca Film Festival and "Take Care", written and directed by Liz Tuccillo (a writer for Sex and The City). Their music has been featured in the Academy Award winning film "Silver Linings Playbook," (the song "Goodnight Moon") as well as other films including, Edgar Wright's "Hot Fuzz" (the song "Here Come The Fuzz"), Michel Gondry's "The We and The I" (the song "Pills").

They made the music of Gillette's The Art of Shaving campaign commercial The Gentleman Shaver. This short film, which was released in February 2011 and directed by Ben Briand, won multiple awards including the Clio Award in 2012 for Film-Music original.

They participated in a collaboration with New York-based artist Mike Doughty and American alternative rock band They Might Be Giants to produce the song "Mr. Xcitement".

Elegant Too are guest credited for their collaboration with American songwriter Jonathan Coulton on a cover of "Want You Gone" that was on Coulton's 2011 album Artificial Heart.

In 2026, Elegant Too collaborated with They Might Be Giants to create a remix of the song "Eyeball" on the Eyeball EP.

== Awards ==
Elegant Too are recipients of the ASCAP Screen Music Award (2018), as well as having been participants in the ASCAP / Columbia University film work shop. They were also the winners of The Doodle Award for Collaborative Achievement in the ASCAP / Columbia University Film Festival for their work as composers on the short film "Tidy Up", directed by Satsuki Okawa (2011), which has been released as a part of The Criterion Collection. Elegant Too have also won a Clio Award for their music in advertising.
