= No! =

Studio album by They Might Be Giants
- Released: June 11, 2002
- Recorded: 1991 ("The Edison Museum"), February–June 1999, Spring 2000
- Studio: Coyote Studio, Brooklyn
- Genre: Alternative rock, children's music
- Length: 33:48
- Label: Idlewild/Rounder Kids (US); Shock Records (Australia)
- Producer: They Might Be Giants

They Might Be Giants chronology
| They Might Be Giants In... Holidayland (2001) | No! (2002) | They Got Lost (2002) |

Professional ratings
Aggregate scores
| Source | Rating |
|---|---|
| Metacritic | (84/100) |
Review scores
| Source | Rating |
| AllMusic | 4.5/5 stars |
| Billboard | (favorable) |
| Blender | 3/5 stars |
| Pitchfork Media | (7/10) |
| PopMatters | (Deluxe Edition) |
| Robert Christgau | (dud) |
| The Rolling Stone Album Guide | 3/5 stars |

No! is the first children's album and ninth studio album by American alternative rock band They Might Be Giants, released in 2002 on Rounder Records and Idlewild Recordings.

Retaining the eclecticism, humor and psychedelic sensibilities of their adult work, the lyrical stylings are decidedly different: the darker themes of death and depression have been replaced with songs extolling the virtues of imagination, robots and sleep. The album declares itself TMBG's first album "for the entire family", with the intention that songs appeal to both young and old audiences. The album contains a cover of Vic Mizzy's safety song "In the Middle, In the Middle, In the Middle" sung by Robin Goldwasser.

No! was released as an enhanced CD; while it plays normally in any CD audio player, it features a CD-ROM portion as well, providing the listener with interactive flash animations by the Chopping Block.

"The Edison Museum" was originally written in 1991 and featured on the Edisongs compilation that year. The recorded version appearing here is largely the same as the Edisongs version, but has been slightly modified. The modified version here previously appeared on Long Tall Weekend in 1999. "Robot Parade" appears in the closing credits of "Them, Robot", the 503rd episode of The Simpsons.

The largely positive reception the album received led to a collaboration with Walt Disney Records and the Disney Sound label. They released three albums through the mid-2000s, each with a theme: Here Come the ABCs (2005), Here Come the 123s (2008), and Here Comes Science (2009). The band's fifth children's music album, Why?, released in 2015, was intended as a more direct follow-up to No!.

The cover art for the album depicts characters signing the words "They Might Be Giants" in American Sign Language.

== Track listing ==
All songs by They Might Be Giants unless otherwise noted.

| No. | Title | Writer(s) | Length |
|---|---|---|---|
| 1. | "Fibber Island" | | 2:10 |
| 2. | "Four of Two" | | 2:18 |
| 3. | "Robot Parade" | | 1:22 |
| 4. | "No!" | | 1:30 |
| 5. | "Where Do They Make Balloons?" | Danny Weinkauf | 2:41 |
| 6. | "In the Middle, In the Middle, In the Middle" | Vic Mizzy | 1:16 |
| 7. | "Violin" | | 2:26 |
| 8. | "John Lee Supertaster" | | 2:01 |
| 9. | "The Edison Museum" | They Might Be Giants/Brian Dewan | 2:02 |
| 10. | "The House At The Top Of The Tree" | | 2:31 |
| 11. | "Clap Your Hands" | | 1:22 |
| 12. | "I'm Not Your Broom" | | 1:04 |
| 13. | "Wake Up Call" | | 1:10 |
| 14. | "I Am a Grocery Bag" | | 0:35 |
| 15. | "Lazyhead and Sleepybones" | | 3:28 |
| 16. | "Bed Bed Bed" | | 3:12 |
| 17. | "Sleepwalkers" | | 2:42 |
| Total length: | | | 33:48 |

The Enhanced CD portion of the CD contains a hidden track about the Chopping Block, the designers of the enhanced CD and tmbg.com, one of the band's websites.

2012 digital "deluxe" version bonus tracks

| No. | Title | Length |
|---|---|---|
| 1. | "Alphabet of Nations (Bonus Extended Version)" | 2:20 |
| 2. | "John Lee Supertaster (Live Almanac)" | 3:09 |
| 3. | "Violin (Live Almanac)" | 2:55 |
| 4. | "Clap Your Hands (Live Almanac - Censored)" | 1:58 |
| 5. | "Robot Parade (Live Almanac)" | 2:53 |
| 6. | "Doctor Worm (Live Almanac)" | 2:58 |
| 7. | "Stalk of Wheat (Live Almanac)" | 1:30 |
| Total length: | | 51:25 |

== Personnel ==
=== Musicians ===
- John Flansburgh – lead and backing vocals, acoustic and electric guitars
- John Linnell – lead and backing vocals, accordion, piano, saxophone
- Dan Miller – electric guitar
- Danny Weinkauf – bass guitar, lead vocals on "Where Do They Make Balloons?"
- Dan Hickey – drums
- Robin Goldwasser – lead vocals on "In the Middle"
- Nicholas Hill – lead vocals and vibraband on "The Edison Museum"
- Dan Levine – trombone/tuba on "John Lee Supertaster"
- Jim O'Connor – trumpet on "John Lee Supertaster"
- Crystof Witek – violin on "Violin"
- Gero Yellin – cello on "Violin"

=== Production Crew ===
- Produced by Pat Dillett
- Recorded & Mixed by Albert Calatt
- Animated by The Chopping Block Studios Inc.
