= Neon Repairman =

Studio album by Freedy Johnston
- Released: June 25, 2015
- Genre: Alternative rock
- Length: 38:41
- Label: Singing Magnet
- Producer: Freedy Johnston

Freedy Johnston chronology
Rain on the City (2010)	Neon Repairman (2015)

Neon Repairman is the ninth studio album by singer-songwriter Freedy Johnston, as well as his first self-produced album. It was released in 2015 on Singing Magnet Records.

== Critical reception ==
Professional ratings
Review scores
Source	Rating
American Songwriter	(favorable)
Magnet	(favorable)
Vice (Expert Witness)	B+

Robbie Fulks wrote that on the album, "The music is played with hearts out and dicks in, to coin a phrase that I sincerely hope does not catch on." Peter Gerstenzang of City Pages called the album "another stunning collection brimming with both indelible melodies and wonderfully seedy characters."

== Track listing ==
All songs written by Freedy Johnston.

1. "Neon Repairman" – 5:00
2. "Baby, Baby Come Home" – 4:27
3. "TV in My Arms" – 3:07
4. "Summer Clothes" – 4:21
5. "By the Broke Streetlight" – 2:27
6. "The First to Leave the World, Is the First to See the World" – 3:51
7. "Angeline" – 3:53
8. "The Sentimental Heart" – 3:13
9. "Her Hair Is Blowing in the Wind of Another Planet" – 4:04
10. "A Little Bit of Somethin' Wrong" – 4:18

== Personnel ==
- Freedy Johnston – vocals, instruments
- John Calarco – drums
- David Raven – drums
- Chris Boeger – bass
- Dusty Wakeman – bass
- Chris Lawrence – guitar, pedal steel
- Doug Pettibone – guitar
- Jim Chapdelaine – guitar
- Dave Adler – mellotron, rhodes
- James Cowan – bongos, percussion
- Biff Blumfungagnge – violin
- Mary Gaines – cello
