= Eros and the Eschaton =

American noise pop band

- Origin: Greensboro, North Carolina
- Genres: Noise pop
- Years active: 2012-present
- Label: Bar/None
- Members: Kate Perdoni; Adam Hawkins; James Finch; Alex Koshak; Mitch Macura; Ryan Spradlin

Eros and the Eschaton are an American noise pop band from Greensboro, North Carolina.

== Career ==
Eros and the Eschaton released their debut full-length album in 2013 on Bar/None Records titled Home Address For Civil War. In 2016, the band released their second full-length album titled Weight of Matter, also on Bar/None.

== Discography ==
=== Studio albums ===
- Home Address For Civil War (2013, Bar/None)
- Weight of Matter (2016, Bar/None)
