= The Hardest Way =

Studio album by the Original Sins
- Released: 1989
- Studio: Water Music, Hoboken, N.J.
- Genre: Garage punk
- Length: 41:50 (vinyl edition); 55:53 (CD edition)
- Label: Psonik
- Producer: Dave Stein, John Terlesky

The Original Sins chronology
Big Soul (1987)	The Hardest Way (1989)	Self Destruct (1990)

The Hardest Way is an album by the American garage punk band the Original Sins. It was released in 1989 by Psonik Records.

The CD version of the album includes bonus tracks taken from the band's Australia-only extended play, Party's Over.

== Critical reception ==
Professional ratings
Review scores
Source	Rating
AllMusic	4.5/5 stars
Chicago Tribune	3/4 stars

Trouser Press wrote that the album "demonstrates the Sins' marvelous ability to synthesize an original sound — less stylized than the Lyres' — from now-standard ingredients." The Morning Call listed The Hardest Way on their list of the top 10 albums of 1989, writing that "the Sins' second LP is an embarrassment of riches; it's fiercer, more melodic, more complex and more danceable than their debut, Big Soul." Spin wrote that "the songs fit more comfortably into standard 60s punk grooves."

== Track listing ==
All songs written by John Terlesky

Side one
No.	Title	Length
1.	"Heard It All Before"	3:05
2.	"Now's the Time"	2:11
3.	"Tearing Me in 2"	3:36
4.	"Why You Love Me So"	2:24
5.	"Can't Get Over You"	3:38
6.	"Hardest Way"	3:03
7.	"Out of My Mind"	3:00

Side two
No.	Title	Length
1.	"You Can't Touch Me"	2:34
2.	"Don't Fit In"	2:07
3.	"Rather Be Sad"	3:43
4.	"I Can't Say"	2:26
5.	"She Understands"	3:33
6.	"Ain't No Tellin'"	2:36
7.	"End of the World"	3:48

CD Version
No.	Title	Length
1.	"Heard It All Before"	3:05
2.	"Now's the Time"	2:05
3.	"Tearing Me in 2"	3:33
4.	"Why You Love Me So"	2:18
5.	"Can't Get Over You"	3:33
6.	"Hardest Way"	2:58
7.	"Out of My Mind"	2:54
8.	"You Can't Touch Me"	2:31
9.	"Don't Fit In"	2:00
10.	"Rather Be Sad"	3:37
11.	"I Can't Say"	2:20
12.	"She Understands"	3:26
13.	"Ain't No Tellin'"	2:34
14.	"End of the World"	3:28
15.	"Party's Over"	3:09
16.	"Can't Stop Dancing"	3:41
17.	"Beast in Me"	3:38
18.	"Lacerations"	2:05
19.	"Just 14 (And a Half)"	3:27

== Personnel ==
The Original Sins

- Ken Bussiere – bass guitar, backing vocals
- Dave Ferrara – drums, backing vocals
- Dan McKinney – organ
- John Terlesky – vocals, guitar, production

Additional musicians and production

- Jane Brown – illustrations
- James MacMillan – engineering
- Dave Stein – production
- Scott Stralo – photography
- Howie Weinberg – mastering
