= Eyeball (EP) =

2026 EP by They Might Be Giants

EP by They Might Be Giants
- Released: January 15, 2026
- Genre: Alternative rock
- Length: 8:31
- Label: Idlewild
- Producer: Patrick Dillett; They Might Be Giants

They Might Be Giants chronology
The Pamphlet (2021)	Eyeball (2026)

Eyeball is the 26th EP by American alternative rock band They Might Be Giants, released on January 15, 2026.

== Writing ==
John Linnell said about the creation of Eyeball:

Our favorite way of making records (we still call them that) is to write and record too many songs and then arrange the ones that work together as an album. We always have a bunch of good tracks left over to make an EP. I'm sure there's some exact equivalent process that goes on in the kitchen of a fancy restaurant but I'm just guessing here. Anyway these are the "amuse-bouche" or perhaps "amuse-oreille" tracks that we hope will be an enticing appetizer before the next album emerges from the oven.

== Track listing ==
All tracks are written by They Might Be Giants.

No.	Title	Length
1.	"Eyeball"	2:14
2.	"The Glamour of Rock"	1:32
3.	"Peggy Guggenheim"	2:31
4.	"Eyeball (Elegant Too remix)"	2:14
Total length:		8:31

== Personnel ==
They Might Be Giants

- John Flansburgh – vocals, production
- John Linnell – vocals, production
- Danny Weinkauf – bass guitar
- Marty Beller – drums
- Dan Miller – guitar
- Dan Levine – trombone (2, 3)
- Mark Pender – trumpet (2, 3)
- Stan Harrison – saxophone (2, 3)

Production

- Patrick Dillett – production
- Elegant Too – remixing (4)
- John Flansburgh – cover artwork

== Performances ==
On April 18, 2026, during the second show of The Bigger Show Tour, the song "Eyeball" was performed for the first time live.
