= Bad Reputation (Freedy Johnston song) =

Single by Freedy Johnston

from the album This Perfect World
- Released: 1994
- Length: 4:10
- Label: Elektra
- Songwriter(s): Freedy Johnston
- Producer(s): Butch Vig

"Bad Reputation" is a song by American singer-songwriter Freedy Johnston, featured on his major label debut This Perfect World. It is his best known song, and has received airplay along with being featured in the 1996 film Kingpin and in the closing credits of the 1995 film Kicking and Screaming as well as appearing on an episode of Hindsight.

The song peaked at #54 on the Billboard Hot 100 in February 1995, and remained on the chart for 12 weeks.

== Covers ==
- Death Cab for Cutie covered the song as a bonus track for their Plans album.
