= They Got Lost =

Compilation album by They Might Be Giants
- Released: July 23, 2002
- Recorded: 1996–2001
- Genre: Alternative rock
- Length: 38:31
- Label: Idlewild/Zoë
- Producer: Pat Dillett

They Might Be Giants chronology
No! (2002)	They Got Lost (2002)	Indestructible Object (2004)

They Got Lost is a rarities compilation album by American alternative rock band They Might Be Giants, released in 2002 in the United States and 2005 in the United Kingdom. It was available through online order several years before it went into general release.

Five tracks were previously released on the 1999 eMusic studio album Long Tall Weekend, while four others are culled from the Working Undercover for the Man EP. Several tracks were previously featured on the band's Dial-A-Song service and its associated website, as well as the band's TMBG Unlimited mp3 subscription service. Others were produced for various side projects, such as ABC's Nightline in Primetime TV mini-series Brave New World ("All Alone", a sea shanty-like song about a bacterium transported to the Moon by Surveyor 3); a special edition of McSweeney's Quarterly Concern ("Theme from McSweeney's"); and the radio show This American Life ("I'm Sick (of This American Life)"). The title song previously appeared on the live album Severe Tire Damage (with a more up tempo rock arrangement), and Long Tall Weekend as the same recording that appears on this compilation.

This collection marks the third official release of the brief "Token Back to Brooklyn," first issued as a hidden track on the 1996 album Factory Showroom and reissued on Long Tall Weekend.

== Reception ==
Professional ratings
Review scores
Source	Rating
AllMusic	4/5 stars

AllMusic called the compilation "a collection of truly rare rarities, it shows once again that the group's more obscure songs are quite often just as great as their best-known ones." They particularly praised the silliness of many of the tunes, and the interesting notes on their backgrounds.

== Track listing ==
All songs by They Might Be Giants unless otherwise noted.

No.	Title	Writer(s)	Length
1.	"Rest Awhile"		1:40
2.	"Truth in Your Words"		1:10
3.	"On the Drag"		2:18
4.	"All Alone"		1:33
5.	"Down to the Bottom of the Sea"		0:53
6.	"I'm Sick (Of This American Life)"		1:27
7.	"Words Are Like (demo)"		1:38
8.	"I Am a Human Head"		2:51
9.	"Oranges"		1:08
10.	"Empty Bottle Blues"		1:38
11.	"They Got Lost"		4:36
12.	"Reprehensible"		3:13
13.	"Rat Patrol"		2:01
14.	"The Army's Tired Now"		1:11
15.	"Certain People I Could Name"		3:23
16.	"Theme to McSweeney's"		2:30
17.	"Dollar for Dollar"		0:24
18.	"Mosh Momken Abadon"	Riad al-Sunbat, Ma'mun al-Shinawi	2:53
19.	"Token Back to Brooklyn"		0:52
20.	"Disappointing Show"		2:31
21.	"Oranges Testimonial"		1:12
