= They Might Be Giants In... Holidayland =

EP by They Might Be Giants
- Released: November 6, 2001
- Recorded: 1988–2000
- Genre: Alternative rock
- Length: 11:47
- Label: Restless

They Might Be Giants chronology
Mink Car (2001)	They Might Be Giants In... Holidayland (2001)	No! (2002)

Professional ratings
Review scores
Source	Rating
Allmusic	link
The Austin Chronicle	(average) link
The A.V. Club	(mixed) link
Entertainment Weekly	B link
Robert Christgau	link

They Might Be Giants In... Holidayland (sometimes referred to simply as Holidayland) is a holiday-themed EP released by American alternative rock band They Might Be Giants on November 6, 2001 under Restless Records. The recording consists of: "Santa Claus", a Sonics cover; "Santa's Beard", first released on Lincoln and later Then: The Earlier Years; "Feast of Lights" a song related to Hanukkah; "Careless Santa", from Mono Puff's album Unsupervised; and "O Tannenbaum" a song that was originally only limited addition.

== Track listing ==
All songs written by They Might Be Giants unless noted.

No.	Title	Length
1.	"Santa Claus" (Gerry Roslie)	2:55
2.	"Santa's Beard"	1:55
3.	"Feast of Lights"	2:35
4.	"Careless Santa" (featuring Yuval Gabay) (Flansburgh)	2:19
5.	"O Tannenbaum" (trad.)	2:05
Total length:		10:69

== Reception ==
They Might Be Giants In... Holidayland received mixed reviews from critics. AllMusic gave it a 2 out of 5 stars stating that, "Unfortunately, the EP's newest track, a cover of the Sonics' 'Santa Claus,' is also the most unremarkable, but overall Holidayland will please the They Might Be Giants fans who don't already own these fun, festive songs."
