= The Trouble Tree =

Studio album by Freedy Johnston
- Released: 1990
- Recorded: April 1989–June 1989
- Studios: Water Music, Hoboken, NJ
- Genre: Alternative rock
- Length: 64:29
- Label: Bar/None
- Producer: Chris Butler

Freedy Johnston chronology
The Trouble Tree (1990)	Can You Fly (1992)

The Trouble Tree is the debut album by Freedy Johnston, released in 1990 through Bar/None Records.

== Production ==
The album was recorded in Hoboken, New Jersey.

== Critical reception ==
Professional ratings
Review scores
Source	Rating
AllMusic	4/5 stars
Robert Christgau	(3-star Honorable Mention)
The Encyclopedia of Popular Music	3/5 stars
MusicHound Rock: The Essential Album Guide	2.5/5 stars
(The New) Rolling Stone Album Guide	1/5 stars
Sounds	3.5/5 stars
Spin Alternative Record Guide	6/10

Trouser Press wrote that the album "captures Johnston’s wheedling and whiny voice in extreme close-up, forcing listeners to seek refuge in overextended wordplay and spare guitar-based arrangements." The Spin Alternative Record Guide called it "raw-sounding, infatuated with dangerous sorts, and a bit unformed lyrically."

== Track listing ==
All tracks are written by Freedy Johnston.

No.	Title	Length
1.	"Innocent"	2:26
2.	"Down on the Moon No. 1"	3:24
3.	"No Violins"	3:45
4.	"That's What You Get"	3:38
5.	"Fun Ride"	5:20
6.	"Gina"	3:42
7.	"Nature Boy"	4:46
8.	"Bad Girl"	3:08
9.	"After My Shocks"	2:54
10.	"Tucumcari"	2:17
11.	"Down on the Moon No. 2"	3:52
12.	"Little Red Haired Girl"	4:33
13.	"[untitled]"	20:39

== Personnel ==
Musicians

- Alan Bezozi – drums
- David Hamburger – guitar
- Freedy Johnston – vocals, guitar
- James MacMillan – bass guitar, engineering
- Doug Snodgrass – bass guitar

Production and additional personnel

- Chris Butler – production, guitar on "Fun Ride" and "After My Shocks"
- Andy Burton – keyboards on "Fun Ride"
- B. Woody Giessmann – drums on "Little Red Haired Girl"
- John Halpern – photography
- Jody Harris – guitar on "Fun Ride"
