= Man, It's So Loud in Here =

2001 single by They Might Be Giants

"Man, It's So Loud In Here"

Single by They Might Be Giants

from the album Mink Car
- Released: August 2001
- Recorded: 2001
- Genre: Alternative rock, Hi-NRG
- Length: 3:59
- Label: Restless (US); Shock (Australia)
- Songwriters: John Flansburgh and John Linnell
- Producer: Adam Schlesinger

They Might Be Giants singles chronology
"Boss of Me" (2000)	"Man, It's So Loud In Here" (2001)	"Experimental Film" (2004)

"Man, It's So Loud in Here" is a song by American alternative rock band They Might Be Giants, released in 2001. Released as the lead single of Mink Car that same year, the song charted at number 86 on the Australian Recording Industry Association charts.

== Recording ==
A demo of the song was recorded at Adam Schlesinger's home studio starting with a drum machine pattern, but the band replaced most of the original tracks found on the demo once they relocated to TMF Studios. The song was primarily recorded using a Proteus 2000 module, although the gated guitar sound on the chorus was created using a preset on a Roland synthesizer. John Flansburgh likened the song's rhythm tracks to early music from the Pet Shop Boys and believed that the remaining instrumentation resembled New Order.

In a 2025 interview, John Flansburgh stated that They Might Be Giants decided to make "Man, It's So Loud in Here" like they were creating a remix.

== Track listing ==
U.S. single

All tracks are written by They Might Be Giants.

No.	Title	Length
1.	"Man, It's So Loud in Here (radio edit)"	3:51
2.	"Man, It's So Loud in Here"	3:59
3.	"Man, It's So Loud in Here (Hot 2002 Remix)"	3:42

Australian single

All tracks are written by They Might Be Giants unless noted.

No.	Title	Length
1.	"Man, It's So Loud in Here (radio edit)"	3:51
2.	"Your Mom's Alright (featuring Mike Doughty)"	2:59
3.	"Man, It's So Loud in Here (Hot 2002 Remix)"	3:42
4.	"Rest Awhile"	1:40
5.	"On the Drag"	2:18
6.	"Man, It's So Loud in Here (Hot 2002 Remix)"	3:42

European single

All tracks are written by They Might Be Giants.

No.	Title	Length
1.	"Man, It's So Loud in Here (radio edit)"	3:51
2.	"Man, It's So Loud in Here"	3:59
3.	"Birdhouse in Your Soul (Live from New York)"	3:12

== Chart performance ==
Chart (2001)	Peak position
Australia (ARIA)	86
