= Right Between the Promises =

Studio album by Freedy Johnston
- Released: August 7, 2001
- Genre: Alternative rock
- Length: 37:56
- Label: Elektra
- Producer: Cameron Greider

Freedy Johnston chronology
Live at 33 1/3 (2000)	Right Between the Promises (2001)	The Way I Were: 4-Track Demos 1986-1992 (2004)

Right Between the Promises is the sixth studio album by singer-songwriter Freedy Johnston. It was released in 2001 on Elektra Records.

== Reception ==
Professional ratings
Review scores
Source	Rating
AllMusic	4/5 stars
Robert Christgau	(1-star Honorable Mention)
Rolling Stone	3/5 stars

AllMusic's Kenneth Bays describes the album as "simultaneously the flip side of, and a companion piece to, 1999's Blue Days Black Nights. Where that album's songs flowed with an ominous energy barely concealed by the moody, hushed tones of their surface, Promises forces those same emotions out into the light." Resulting in "[s]mart, darkly ambiguous songs that nevertheless seem built for high-volume, summertime play." Concluding "Right Between the Promises may not be as richly nuanced as [Johnston's] very best work, but it's still a fine example of his idiosyncratic brand of intelligent, radio-friendly folk-rock."

Rolling Stone's James Hunter called the album "[c]omposed songs about being confused." Noting that Johnston "just sings his modestly fluid, sweet-toned tunes in a voice to match."

== Track listing ==
All songs written by Freedy Johnston, except where noted.

1. "Broken Mirror" – 2:39
2. "Waste Your Time" – 3:55
3. "Love Grows" (Tony Macaulay, Barry Mason) – 2:28
4. "That's Alright with Me" – 4:57
5. "Radio for Heartache" – 2:37
6. "Back to My Machine" – 5:05
7. "Arriving on a Train" – 4:20
8. "Save Yourself, City Girl" – 3:49
9. "Anyone" – 3:45
10. "In My Dream" – 4:21

== Personnel ==
- Freedy Johnston – vocals, guitar
- Cameron Greider – guitar, piano, bass, percussion, background vocals
- Alan Bezozi – drums
- Butch Vig – drums
- Bon Hamlet – drums
- Graham Maby – bass
- Paul Eske – bass
- Phil Lyons – bass
- Jay Moran – piano, background vocals
- Mary Gaines – background vocals
- Christine Gatti – background vocals
- James Cowan – percussion
- John Vriesacker – violin
- Karl Lavine – cello
- Tina Kakuske – flute
- Mark Haines – guitar, tambourine
- Tom Williams – tambourine
