= Never Home =

Studio album by Freedy Johnston
- Released: February 25, 1997
- Genre: Alternative
- Length: 40:19
- Label: Elektra
- Producer: Danny Kortchmar

Freedy Johnston chronology
This Perfect World (1994)	Never Home (1997)	Blue Days Black Nights (1999)

Professional ratings
Review scores
Source	Rating
AllMusic	4.5/5 stars
Robert Christgau	A−
Rolling Stone	3.5/5 stars

Never Home is the fourth album by singer-songwriter Freedy Johnston. It was released in 1997 on Elektra Records. Johnston credited producer Danny Kortchmar with imparting a more spontaneous, live-sounding feel to this album than its predecessor, This Perfect World.

The leadoff track, "On the Way Out," is a wry song about shoplifting. It's a re-recorded version of a song that appeared on the soundtrack to the movie Things to Do in Denver When You're Dead. (He had originally written it for the movie Empire Records, but it was not accepted.) It and "One More Thing to Break" are the only two songs on the album that have much of a rock edge.

"Western Sky" is about a man afraid to fly because of the death of his father in a crash. Johnston doesn't typically use events in the lives of friends as inspiration for his songs, but this is an exception. He was a little uncomfortable with the notion of having "exploited" a friend, although he noted that the friend had no problem with the song.

Another highlight, "Gone to See the Fire," concerns a woman gradually working out a very disturbing secret about her boyfriend. "If It's True" wrestles with unplanned pregnancy.

"Something's Out There," a fairly light song about UFO abduction, is a rare collaboration for Johnston. He wrote it with Stan Lynch, the album's drummer, who is best known for his work with Tom Petty.

Cellist Jane Scarpantoni, a frequent Johnston collaborator, appears on two tracks.

== Track listing ==
All songs written by Freedy Johnston, except where noted.

1. "On the Way Out" – 2:48
2. "I'm Not Hypnotized" – 3:14
3. "Western Sky" – 4:29
4. "One More Thing to Break" – 3:42
5. "He Wasn't Murdered" – 3:11
6. "You Get Me Lost" – 4:31
7. "Hotel Seventeen" – 3:36
8. "Gone to See the Fire" – 3:12
9. "Seventies Girl" – 4:05
10. "If It's True" – 4:00
11. "Something's Out There" (Johnston, Stan Lynch) – 3:31

== Personnel ==
- Freedy Johnston – vocals, guitar
- Danny Kortchmar – guitar, keyboards, percussion
- Graham Maby – bass
- Stan Lynch – drums, percussion, guitar
- Dave Schramm – guitar, lap steel
- Jane Scarpantoni – cello
- Mary Lee Kortes – background vocals
