= Live at McCabe's Guitar Shop (Freedy Johnston album) =

Live album by Freedy Johnston
- Released: July 11, 2006
- Recorded: April 25, 1998
- Genre: Alternative rock
- Length: 56:16
- Label: Shout! Factory
- Producer: Derek Dressler

Freedy Johnston chronology
The Way I Were: 4-Track Demos 1986-1992 (2004)	Live at McCabe's Guitar Shop (2006)	My Favorite Waste of Time (2007)

Professional ratings
Review scores
Source	Rating
AllMusic	3/5 stars

Live at McCabe's Guitar Shop is a live album by singer-songwriter Freedy Johnston. It was recorded in 1998 and released in 2006 on Shout! Factory Records.

== Track listing ==
All songs written by Freedy Johnston, except where noted.

1. "Introduction" – 0:52
2. "The Farthest Lights" – 4:14
3. "Radio for Heartache" – 3:26
4. "Underwater Life" – 5:18
5. "Moving on a Holiday" – 3:14
6. "Pretend It's Summer" – 5:31
7. "Evie's Tears" – 3:29
8. "Gone Like the Water" – 3:16
9. "You Get Me Lost" – 4:56
10. "Two Lovers Stop" – 2:54
11. "Wichita Lineman" (Jimmy Webb) – 4:44
12. "Western Sky" – 4:32
13. "This Perfect World" – 5:27
14. "Bad Reputation" – 4:23

== Personnel ==
- Freedy Johnston – vocals, guitar, banjo
- Mark Spencer – guitar, backing vocals
