= Blue Days Black Nights =

Studio album by Freedy Johnston
- Released: July 20, 1999
- Genre: Alternative rock
- Length: 40:12
- Label: Elektra
- Producer: T-Bone Burnett, Roger Moutenot

Freedy Johnston chronology
Never Home (1997)	Blue Days Black Nights (1999)	Live at 33 1/3 (2000)

Blue Days Black Nights is the fifth album by singer-songwriter Freedy Johnston. It was released in 1999 on Elektra Records.

== Reception ==
Professional ratings
Review scores
Source	Rating
AllMusic	4/5 stars
Robert Christgau	(1-star Honorable Mention)
Rolling Stone	3/5 stars

Rolling Stone's Rob Sheffield called Johnston "[a] complete singer-songwriter" who "[u]nlike your typical solo guitar guy… can actually sing." He concluded that "Blue Days Black Nights is his finest bag of tunes since the 1992 cult classic Can You Fly, on which his emotional folk rock really came together."

AllMusic's Jason Ankeny called the album Johnston's "darkest, most understated to date" and "the singer's most intimate effort, largely rejecting the quirky character studies of prior outings in favor of more plainly personal narratives, and revealing new shades of depth and honesty in the process." Concluding that "Blue Days Black Nights possesses a hushed gravity which insinuates itself only over repeated listens."

== Track listing ==
All songs written by Freedy Johnston.

1. "Underwater Life" – 5:11
2. "The Farthest Lights" – 3:55
3. "While I Wait for You" – 3:33
4. "Pretend It's Summer" – 5:27
5. "Changed Your Mind" – 4:00
6. "Caught as You Look Away" – 3:26
7. "Moving on a Holiday" – 2:56
8. "Until the Sun Comes Back Again" – 3:02
9. "Depending on the Night" – 4:15
10. "Emily" – 4:27

== Personnel ==
- Freedy Johnston – vocals, guitar, piano
- Cameron Greider – guitar, background vocals, tack piano
- Andy Hess – bass
- Jim Keltner – drums
- Roger Moutenot – piano
- Rich Pagano – drums
- Mark Spencer – lap steel
- Roy Nathanson – saxophone
- Curtis Fowlkes – trombone
- Rob Thomas – violin
- Doug Petty – keyboards
- Rufus Capodoccia – cello
- Robin Lorentz – violin
- Stephanie Fife – cello
- Suzzy Roche – background vocals
