= Mink Car =

Studio album by They Might Be Giants
- Released: September 11, 2001
- Recorded: March 1999–May 2001
- Studio: Coyote Studio, Brooklyn; Kampo Studios, Manhattan; The Magic Shop, Manhattan; TMF Studio, Manhattan; Soundtrack Studios, Manhattan; Westside Studio, London; Studio 4 Recording, Philadelphia
- Genre: Alternative rock
- Length: 46:24 (US Release) 38:14 (European Release)
- Label: Restless
- Producer: Adam Schlesinger (tracks: 3, 5, 8), Albert Caiati (tracks: 7, 9, 10, 12, 13, 15, 16), Clive Langer & Alan Winstanley (tracks: 1, 2, 6, 11), Patrick Dillett (tracks: 7, 9, 10, 12, 13, 15, 16), They Might Be Giants (tracks: 4, 7, 9, 10, 12–16)

They Might Be Giants chronology
Working Undercover for the Man (2000)	Mink Car (2001)	They Might Be Giants In... Holidayland (2001)

Alternative cover
- 2022 vinyl/digital re-release

Singles from Mink Car
- 1. "Man, It's So Loud in Here" Released: November 12, 2001

Professional ratings
Aggregate scores
Source	Rating
Metacritic	(60/100)
Review scores
Source	Rating
Allmusic	4/5 stars
Alternative Press	3/5 stars
The A.V. Club	(favorable)
Blender	2/5 stars
Pitchfork Media	(2.8/10)
PopMatters	8/10 stars
Robert Christgau	(2-star Honorable Mention)
Rolling Stone	3/5 stars
Slant Magazine	3.5/5 stars

Mink Car is the eighth studio album by American alternative rock band They Might Be Giants, released on September 11, 2001, on the Restless Records label.

== Composition ==
It runs the gamut from pop songs, such as "Bangs" and "Finished With Lies", to dance music ("Man, It's So Loud In Here"), and soft romantic ballads ("Another First Kiss"). The title track musically references Burt Bacharach (from cocktail piano introduction to horn interludes) while lyrically it offers an absurd take on lush lifestyles and dreamy music ("I got hit by a mink car ... driven by a guitar"). "Man, It's So Loud in Here" was the only single released from the album, though its cover of the Georgie Fame oldie "Yeh Yeh" was featured in a Chrysler car commercial. "Bangs," "Cyclops Rock," "Man, It's So Loud In Here," and "Another First Kiss", as well as "Boss of Me" (which was featured on non-U.S. releases), were released on the band's 2002 anthology compilation Dial-A-Song: 20 Years of They Might Be Giants.

== Track listings ==
The track listing for the album varied depending on where it was released. Some releases featured bonus tracks, such as "Boss of Me" for the Australian release, and "Your Mom's Alright" in Europe.

All tracks are written by John Flansburgh and John Linnell, except where noted.

U.S. release
No.	Title	Writer(s)	Featuring	Length
1.	"Bangs"			3:09
2.	"Cyclops Rock"		Cerys Matthews	2:38
3.	"Man, It's So Loud in Here"			3:59
4.	"Mr. Xcitement"	John Flansburgh, John Linnell, Dan Levine, Elegant Too, Mike Doughty	Mike Doughty	3:36
5.	"Another First Kiss"			3:06
6.	"I've Got a Fang"			2:32
7.	"Hovering Sombrero"			2:13
8.	"Yeh Yeh"	Rodgers Grant, Jon Hendricks, Pat Patrick		2:40
9.	"Hopeless Bleak Despair"			3:08
10.	"Drink!"			1:49
11.	"My Man"			2:57
12.	"Older"			1:58
13.	"Mink Car"			2:09
14.	"Wicked Little Critta"			2:11
15.	"Finished With Lies"			3:18
16.	"She Thinks She's Edith Head"			2:37
17.	"Working Undercover for the Man"			2:19
Total length:				46:24

Japanese Release / 2022 Digital Bonus Tracks
No.	Title	Writer(s)	Featuring	Length
18.	"Boss Of Me"			2:57
19.	"Your Mom's Alright"	John Flansburgh, John Linnell, Elegant Too, Mike Doughty	Mike Doughty	2:57
20.	"McGyver"			0:49
21.	"Robot Parade - Adult Version"			1:05
Total length:				54:14

European release
No.	Title	Writer(s)	Featuring	Length
1.	"Man, It's So Loud in Here"			3:59
2.	"Boss of Me"			2:57
3.	"Cyclops Rock"			2:38
4.	"Another First Kiss"			3:06
5.	"Bangs"			3:09
6.	"My Man"			2:57
7.	"Drink!"			1:49
8.	"Your Mom's Alright"	John Flansburgh, John Linnell, Elegant Too, Mike Doughty	Mike Doughty	2:59
9.	"Hovering Sombrero"			2:13
10.	"Yeh Yeh"	Rodgers Grant, Jon Hendricks, Pat Patrick		2:40
11.	"I've Got a Fang"			2:32
12.	"Mink Car"			2:09
13.	"Hopeless Bleak Despair"			3:08
14.	"Older"			1:58
Total length:				38:14

=== Notes ===
- "Working Undercover for the Man" was previously released in the EP of the same name.
- "She Thinks She's Edith Head" is a re-recorded version of the track of a track with a similar name on Long Tall Weekend.

== Personnel ==
They Might Be Giants

- John Flansburgh
- John Linnell

The Band of Dans

- Dan Hickey – drums, percussion
- Dan Weinkauf – bass
- Dan Miller – guitar

Additionally, Cerys Matthews appears on Cyclops Rock.

== Charts ==
Chart performance for Mink Car
Chart (2001)	Peak position
Australian Albums (ARIA)	102

== Legacy ==
"Bangs" provided the inspiration for author Zadie Smith's short story "The Girl with Bangs".

A complete cover album called Mink Car Cover was constructed in 2011 to raise funds for the FDNY Foundation in the wake of the tenth anniversary of the terrorist attacks that occurred on the day of the album's original release. It featured covers by 19 different artists including Marian Call, The Doubleclicks, Hello, The Future!, and Molly Lewis.
