= Turn You On =

Studio album by The Original Sins
- Released: 1995
- Recorded: at Studio Red, Philadelphia
- Genre: Garage punk, garage rock
- Length: 44:43
- Label: Bedlam Records
- Producer: John Terlesky

The Original Sins chronology
Acidbubblepunk (1994)	Turn You On (1995)	Bethlehem (1996)

Turn You On is the seventh studio album by garage rock band The Original Sins, which was independently released in 1995 through their very own Bedlam Records imprint, a label John Terlesky uses to release his solo material. The album was only ever released as a limited edition vinyl, with its artwork screen printed by hand.

During an interview session, John Terlesky called the album his favorite release by The Original Sins. He also mentioned the possibility of reissuing the record some time after the band's breakup, which would have included live recordings as bonus tracks, but the reissue has yet to see the light of day.

== Track listing ==
All tracks are written by John Terlesky.

Side One
No.	Title	Length
1.	"Original Sins Theme"	1:46
2.	"Turn You On"	3:16
3.	"Pretty Pretty"	2:59
4.	"You're Free"	3:41
5.	"You're So Lucky"	2:30
6.	"In The End"	3:19
7.	"Stupefied"	4:12

Side Two
No.	Title	Length
8.	"Little Piece Of God"	3:32
9.	"O Misery"	2:37
10.	"Contact High"	3:25
11.	"Uncool"	2:07
12.	"Can't Go Home"	3:25
13.	"Now That I Know"	2:58
14.	"Crazy"	4:56

== Personnel ==
- John Terlesky - Vocals, guitar, production
- Ken Bussiere - Bass, backing vocals
- Dan McKinney - Organ
- Seth Baer - Drums, percussion, background vocals
- Maria Stoiancheff - Vocals on "O Misery"
- Adam Lasus - Recording
