= Can You Fly =

Studio album by Freedy Johnston
- Released: April 14, 1992
- Recorded: January–December 1991
- Genre: Alternative rock; alternative country
- Length: 49:42
- Label: Bar/None
- Producer: Graham Maby, Knut Bohn

Freedy Johnston chronology
The Trouble Tree (1990)	Can You Fly (1992)	This Perfect World (1994)

Can You Fly is the second album by singer-songwriter Freedy Johnston, released in 1992 on Bar/None Records.

== Overview ==
In order to finance the recording of the album, Johnston sold some farmland that he inherited from his grandfather. This decision is mentioned in the opening lines of the first track, "Trying to Tell You I Don't Know".

"California Thing" appeared on the soundtrack of the film Heavy.

"The Lucky One" was also covered by Mary Lou Lord on her 1998 album Got No Shadow.

== Critical reception ==
Professional ratings
Review scores
Source	Rating
AllMusic	4.5/5 stars
Chicago Tribune	3.5/4 stars
Christgau's Consumer Guide	A+
Q	3/5 stars
The Rolling Stone Album Guide	4/5 stars
Spin Alternative Record Guide	10/10

Kristi Coulter of AllMusic wrote, "A giant step forward from his likeable but ragged debut, Freedy Johnston's Can You Fly is a stunningly accomplished and coherent album that recalls the raw lyricism of such quintessentially American writers as Raymond Carver and Richard Hugo."

Andy Gill of The Independent said, "Can You Fly is full of Costelloid little depictions of uncertainty. He has a gift, too, for odd verbal juxtapositions, searching for new expression rather than employing the re- arrangement of old cliches. A small gem."

== Track listing ==
All songs written by Freedy Johnston.

1. "Trying to Tell You I Don't Know" – 4:24
2. "In the New Sunshine" – 2:45
3. "Tearing Down This Place" – 4:10
4. "Remember Me" – 2:54
5. "Wheels" – 3:18
6. "The Lucky One" – 3:09
7. "Can You Fly" – 4:34
8. "Responsible" – 5:28
9. "The Mortician's Daughter" – 3:56
10. "Sincere" – 4:18
11. "Down in Love" – 3:04
12. "California Thing" – 3:03
13. "We Will Shine" – 4:39

== Personnel ==
- Freedy Johnston – vocals, guitar, bass
- Graham Maby – bass, electric guitar, background vocals
- Brian Doherty – drums, percussion
- Alan Bezozi – drums, tambourine, wind chimes, percussion, keyboard
- Knut Bohn – guitar, organ, percussion, background vocals
- Kevin Salem – guitar, background vocals
- Jared Michael Nickerson – bass
- Bob Rupe – guitar
- Jimmy Lee – guitar
- Marshall Crenshaw – guitar, bass
- Chris Stamey – electric guitar
- Dave Schramm – lap steel
- James MacMillan – bass
- Jane Scarpantoni – cello
- Kenny Margolis – accordion
- Syd Straw - vocals
