= John Henry (album) =

Studio album by They Might Be Giants
- Released: September 13, 1994
- Recorded: November 1993–June 1994
- Studios: Bearsville (Woodstock, New York); Skyline (New York)
- Genres: Alternative rock, indie rock
- Length: 57:12
- Label: Elektra
- Producers: Paul Fox, They Might Be Giants

They Might Be Giants chronology
Why Does the Sun Shine? (1993)	John Henry (1994)	Factory Showroom (1996)

Singles from John Henry
- 1. "Snail Shell" Released: August 15, 1994

Professional ratings
Review scores
Source	Rating
AllMusic	3/5 stars
Chicago Tribune	2.5/4 stars
Entertainment Weekly	B
NME	7/10
The Rolling Stone Album Guide	3/5 stars
The Village Voice	(choice cut)

John Henry is the fifth studio album by American alternative rock band They Might Be Giants. It was released in 1994. It is the first album by They Might Be Giants to include a full band arrangement, rather than synthesized and programmed backing tracks. The album's name, a reference to the man versus machine fable of John Henry, is an allusion to the band's fundamental switch to more conventional instrumentation, especially the newly established use of a human drummer instead of a drum machine.

John Henry is TMBG's longest record and was the band's highest-charting adult album, having peaked at #61 on the Billboard 200, until 2011's Join Us, which peaked at #32. In 2013, the album was reissued across a double LP by Asbestos Records.

== Lyrical themes ==
The lyrics to the song "AKA Driver" refer to a "NyQuil driver". John Flansburgh offered an explanation of the legal issue with the inclusion of a brand name:

It was a brief education for us in the difference between protected speech and trademark infringement. Although it was a possibility that we could have gotten away with it, or settled with the NyQuil manufacturers for a small amount of money, the path of least hassle was simply omitting the name from the package. According to our lawyer you can say pretty much anything in a song about a product, and that expression is a protected part of every American's freedom of speech. However when you title a song after a trademarked product and then start selling your recording (which is also a product) you run the risk of the trademark holder suing you for infringing on their trademark. To make matters tougher on ol' NyQuil Driver, trademark holders are compelled by the law to protect their trademark or they run the risk of their product name falling into the public domain.

"I Should Be Allowed to Think" excerpts the first line ("I saw the best minds of my generation destroyed by madness, starving, hysterical") of the poem Howl by Allen Ginsberg. The song is also, according to its author, John Linnell, an example of the use of an "unreliable narrator". "Meet James Ensor" refers to an eccentric Belgian expressionist painter whose works excited John Flansburgh. In an interview, Flansburgh explained that "the line 'Dig him up and shake his hand' is actually very specific – a parallel idea to a lot of his paintings which involve resurrections, skeletons and puppets being animated. [...] With the song, I'm trying to encapsulate the issues of his life – an eccentric guy who became celebrated and was soon left behind as his ideas were taken into the culture and other people became expressionists." "Why Must I Be Sad?" is a string of references to Alice Cooper song titles and lyrics, involving several titles from the Billion Dollar Babies album including "No More Mr. Nice Guy," "I Love the Dead," and others.

== Appearances in other media ==
Instrumental excerpts from "No One Knows My Plan" and "The End of The Tour" were used as the opening and closing themes, respectively, during the first season of the animated variety show Cartoon Planet in 1995. "No One Knows My Plan" was also used in a 30-second PBS Kids web promo in 2005.

== Track listing ==
All tracks are written by They Might Be Giants, except where noted.

No.	Title	Length
1.	"Subliminal"	2:45
2.	"Snail Shell"	3:20
3.	"Sleeping In the Flowers"	4:30
4.	"Unrelated Thing"	2:30
5.	"AKA Driver" (They Might Be Giants, Tony Maimone, Brian Doherty)	3:14
6.	"I Should Be Allowed to Think" (They Might Be Giants, Tony Maimone)	3:09
7.	"Extra Savoir-Faire"	2:48
8.	"Why Must I Be Sad?"	4:08
9.	"Spy"	3:06
10.	"O, Do Not Forsake Me"	2:30
11.	"No One Knows My Plan"	2:37
12.	"Dirt Bike"	3:05
13.	"Destination Moon"	2:27
14.	"A Self Called Nowhere"	3:22
15.	"Meet James Ensor"	1:33
16.	"Thermostat"	3:11
17.	"Window"	1:00
18.	"Out of Jail"	2:38
19.	"Stomp Box"	1:55
20.	"The End of the Tour"	3:18
Total length:		57:12

== Personnel ==
John Henry is the first album credited to They Might Be Giants as a full band, rather than a duo:

- John Flansburgh – vocals, guitars
- John Linnell – vocals, keyboards, accordion, saxophones
- Brian Doherty – drums, percussion
- Tony Maimone – bass guitar, ukulele
- Graham Maby – bass guitar on tracks 11 & 14

Additional musicians

- Robert Quine – guitar solos on tracks 3 & 11
- Robin Goldwasser - screaming on track 9
- Hudson Shad – vocals on track 10
- Steven Bernstein – trumpet

== Charts ==
Chart performance for John Henry
Chart (1994)	Peak position
Australian Albums (ARIA)	132
