= Music from Malcolm in the Middle =

Soundtrack album by Various artists
- Released: November 21, 2000
- Recorded: 1998–2000
- Genre: Alternative rock; power pop
- Length: 59:22
- Label: Fox Music; Restless; Rykodisc
- Producer: Linwood Boomer

Singles from Music from Malcolm in the Middle
- 1. "Boss of Me" Released: July 16, 2001

Music from Malcolm in the Middle is the soundtrack to the television series Malcolm in the Middle, released on November 21, 2000 by Fox Music, Restless Records and Rykodisc. The theme song "Boss of Me", performed by They Might Be Giants, won the 2002 Grammy Award for Best Song Written for a Motion Picture, Television or Other Visual Media.

== Track listing ==
1. "Boss of Me" – They Might Be Giants (theme song) – 2:58
2. "Washin' + Wonderin'" – Stroke 9 (from "Therapy") – 3:39
3. "Good Life" – The Getaway People (from "Casino") – 3:29
4. "You All Dat" (radio mix) – Baha Men (from "The Grandparents") – 3:29
5. "Been Here Once Before" – Eagle-Eye Cherry (from "Flashback") – 3:32
6. "Falling for the First Time" – Barenaked Ladies – 3:37
7. "Drunk is Better Than Dead" – The Push Stars (from "Therapy") – 3:39
8. "Bizarro" – Citizen King – 4:07
9. "We are Monkeys" – Travis (from "New Neighbors") – 3:06
10. "Right Place, Wrong Time" – Screamin' Cheetah Wheelies (from "Home Alone 4") – 3:38
11. "Smile" – Hanson (from "Old Mrs. Old") – 3:13
12. "Heaven is a Halfpipe" – OPM – 4:08
13. "Tune In (Round Window)" – Flak (from "Halloween Approximately") – 3:39
14. "Don't Push It, Don't Force It" – Gordon (from "Cheerleader") – 4:10
15. "Cotton Eye Joe" – Rednex (from "Dinner Out") – 3:19
16. "Older" – They Might Be Giants – 1:54
17. "I Just Don't Care" – The Dust Brothers (mix of quotes from mostly second-season episodes) – 3:45
