= The Original Sins =

American garage rock band

- The Original Sins c. 1992

Background information
- Origin: Bethlehem, Pennsylvania
- Genres: Punk rock, garage rock, power pop, psychedelic rock, garage punk
- Years active: 1986 - 1998, 2019
- Labels: Bar None, Psonik, Bedlam, Blood Red Vinyl & Discs
- Past members: John Terlesky; Ken Bussiere; Dan McKinney; Dave Ferrara; Seth Baer

The Original Sins were a garage rock band that formed in 1987 in Bethlehem, Pennsylvania. The group were known for combining the musical stylings of punk rock, psychedelic rock, and even pop music with their songs. The band released a total of nine full-length studio albums across their entire career before the band broke up in early 1998.

On Friday, April 12, 2019, the band reunited to play at Johnny Brenda's in Philadelphia, Pennsylvania.

== History ==
The band emerged in 1987 from the edgy punk scene of Bethlehem, Pennsylvania. The city was going through a major decline at the time due to the closing of the industrial powerhouse Bethlehem Steel. After numerous unsuccessful attempts at joining bands, guitarist John Terlesky decided to form his own band with Ken Bussiere, a bassist he met through Neil Hever, a WMUH college radio disc jockey who was friends with Terlesky. Later on, the duo would meet keyboardist Dan McKinney and drummer Dave Ferrara, and the quintet would name themselves The Original Sins.

Later that same year, the band released their debut studio album Big Soul, which received moderate success within the American underground music scene. Their independent success with Big Soul continued with The Hardest Way (1989) and Self Destruct (1990). Self Destruct included a photo of Terlesky holding a BB gun next to his head as the cover. The band had high expectations for their 1992 album, Move, having had help from Peter Buck of R.E.M., but results were disappointing.

After the release of Move, Ferrara left the group and would later perform in the band The Reach Around Radio Clowns. To replace him, the band hired Seth Baer on drum duties. Seth would stay with the band until he left for school before the production of Suburban Primitive, in which Ferrara came back to perform drums. The band would continue releasing records with Baer, such as Out There (1992) and Acidbubblepunk (1994). Their 1995 album Turn You On was released as a limited edition vinyl record through Terlesky's Bedlam record label.

1996 saw the release of Bethlehem, which was released through Bar/None Records, who had also released their debut album in 1987. Bethlehem showed a change in style and tone for the band, focusing more heavily on pop music rather than the garage punk fury of past releases. The album met high praise from fans and critics alike, with some calling it "the band's greatest achievement". A year after the release of their 1997 album Suburban Primitive, the project finally ended after bassist and founder member Ken Bussiere announced that he would be moving to Florida.

== Members ==
- John Terlesky - Vocals, guitar (1986 - 1998)
- Ken Bussiere - Bass (1986 - 1998)
- Dan McKinney - Organ, keyboards (1986 - 1998)
- Dave Ferrara - Drums (1986 - 1989, 1997 - 1998)
- Kevin Groller - Drums (1989 - 1991)
- Seth Baer - Drums (1991 - 1996)

== Discography ==
Studio albums

- Big Soul (1987, Bar/None)
- The Hardest Way (1989, Psonik)
- Self Destruct (1990, Psonik)
- Move (1992, Psonik)
- Out There (1992, Psonik)
- Acidbubblepunk (1994, Psonik)
- Turn You On (1995, Bedlam)
- Bethlehem (1996, Bar/None)
- Suburban Primitive (1997, Blood Red Vinyl & Discs)

EPs

- Party's Over (1990, Dog Meat)
- Eat This E.P. (1992, Psonik)
- Sally Kirkland/Get Into It (1992, Psonik)
- Afternoon Jam Session (1993, Radiation)
- American Cheese Product 4 Slice (1996, Bedlam)

Singles

- "Cross My Heart"
- "Just 14"
- "Coca-Cola"
- "Nowhere To Go (From Here But Down)"
- "Watch You Dance/Goin' Down"
- "Alice D."
- "Get You There/Come On Up"

Compilations

- Skeletons In The Garage (1997, Spare Me)
