= Out There (The Original Sins album) =

Studio album by the Original Sins
- Released: November 17, 1992
- Recorded: April 14, 1992
- Studios: John Keane, Athens, GA
- Genres: Garage punk, garage rock
- Length: 28:06 (LP); 39:19 (CD)
- Label: Psonik
- Producer: John Terlesky

The Original Sins chronology
Move (1992)	Out There (1992)	Acidbubblepunk (1994)

Professional ratings
Review scores
Source	Rating
AllMusic	3/5 stars

Out There is the fifth studio album by garage rock band the Original Sins, released during the latter half of 1992. It was only a couple of months after their previous release Move. It was the first album of the group to feature drummer Seth Baer.

== Track listing ==
All tracks are written by John Terlesky.

Side one
No.	Title	Length
1.	"Get Off"	3:00
2.	"One Good Reason"	3:02
3.	"C'mon"	3:28
4.	"Wipe Out"	2:22

Side two
No.	Title	Length
5.	"Get into It"	4:34
6.	"Killing Time"	3:34
7.	"Dead Gone Train"	3:45
8.	"Sally Kirkland"	4:12

CD version bonus tracks
No.	Title	Length
9.	"Love Tunnel"	2:45
10.	"Goin' Down"	4:00
11.	"Dizzy"	4:23

== Personnel ==
- John Terlesky - Vocals, guitar, production
- Ken Bussiere - Bass
- Dan McKinney - Organ
- Seth Baer - Drums
- John Keane - Engineering
- Eliza Doolittle - Photography
