= Acidbubblepunk =

Studio album by The Original Sins
- Released: May 9, 1994
- Recorded: at Raspberry Studios in Bethlehem, PA
- Genre: Garage punk, garage rock
- Length: 35:32
- Label: Psonik
- Producer: John Terlesky

The Original Sins chronology
Out There (1992)	Acidbubblepunk (1994)	Turn You On (1995)

Acidbubblepunk is the sixth full-length studio album by garage rock band The Original Sins, released in 1994 through Psonik records. The album is considered by many fans as a disappointing record, with Trouser Press referring to the record as a "disappointing drop in [The Original Sins'] standards". The album cover was drawn by frontman John Terlesky.

== Track listing ==
All tracks are written by John Terlesky.

No.	Title	Length
1.	"Almost Everything"	3:01
2.	"The Wheel"	2:25
3.	"Beautiful Seconds"	2:46
4.	"April"	1:56
5.	"Drop Out"	2:38
6.	"Surfin' Worm"	1:44
7.	"Drivin' Round"	2:14
8.	"Sunshine Games"	1:58
9.	"lay In The Sun"	1:37
10.	"(It's Really Not So) Groovy (Anymore)"	4:01
11.	"She'll Be"	3:34
12.	"Track Twelve (Talkin' Maybe Third Eye Don't Care Blues)"	7:38

== Personnel ==
- John Telersky - Vocals, guitar, artwork
- Ken Busseire - Bass
- Dan McKinney - Organ
- Seth Baer - Drums
