= Self Destruct (album) =

Studio album by the Original Sins
- Released: 1990
- Recorded: May 1990
- Studios: Water Music, Hoboken, NJ
- Genre: Garage punk
- Length: 36:37 (vinyl edition); 45:52 (CD edition)
- Label: Psonik
- Producers: Dave Stein, John Terlesky

The Original Sins chronology
The Hardest Way (1989)	Self Destruct (1990)	Move (1991)

Singles from Self Destruct
- 1. "Nowhere to Go (From Here But Down)" Released: 1991; 2. "Alice D." Released: 1992

Self Destruct is the third album by the American garage punk band the Original Sins. It was released in 1990 through Psonik Records. The CD version of the album included bonus tracks that originally appeared from their 1990 "Coca-Cola" 7" single.

== Critical reception ==
Professional ratings
Review scores
Source	Rating
AllMusic	4/5 stars
Chicago Tribune	3/4 stars

The Chicago Tribune wrote that "John Terlesky's gravelly, abandoned vocals once again ride over searing guitar (with more than a few psychedelic/bluesy accents) and organ, bass and drums that are welded into blasts of raw rock 'n' roll sound." The New York Times determined that "the music is dense, droning pop, through which J. T.'s guitar and ragged vocals cut, gag, stumble and scream."

In 1998, The Philadelphia Inquirer deemed the album "fat-bottomed psychedelic metal."

== Track listing ==
All songs written by John Terlesky

Side one
No.	Title	Length
1.	"Do It"	5:26
2.	"Looking at the Sun"	3:38
3.	"Feel"	4:05
4.	"Nowhere to Go (From Here but Down)"	2:28

Side two
No.	Title	Length
1.	"Alice D."	4:18
2.	"Higher"	4:46
3.	"Rise"	3:45
4.	"Black Hole"	8:08

CD version
No.	Title	Length
1.	"Do It"	5:26
2.	"Looking at the Sun"	3:38
3.	"Feel"	4:05
4.	"Nowhere to Go (From Here but Down)"	2:28
5.	"Alice D."	4:18
6.	"Higher"	4:46
7.	"Rise"	3:45
8.	"Black Hole"	8:08
9.	"Disclaimer"	0:56
10.	"Coca-Cola (Sweet)"	5:17
11.	"Juicy Fruit"	3:00

== Personnel ==
The Original Sins

- Ken Bussiere – bass guitar, backing vocals
- Dave Ferrara – drums, backing vocals
- Dan McKinney – organ
- John Terlesky – vocals, guitar, production, illustrations, design

Additional musicians and production

- Kevin Shire – photography
- John Siket – engineering
- J. Smith – art direction
- Dave Stein – production
- Maria Stoiancheff – photography
