= The Individuals (New Jersey band) =

- Origin: Hoboken, New Jersey, USA
- Genre: Power pop
- Years active: 1978–1983
- Labels: Infidelity; Lust/Unlust; Plexus
- Past members: Glenn Morrow; Janet Wygal; Doug Wygal; Jon Light Klages

The Individuals were an American, Hoboken, New Jersey–based power pop band, led by Glenn Morrow (guitar, vocals, sax, keyboards) and featuring Janet Wygal (bass, vocals, guitar, keyboards), Janet's brother Doug Wygal (drums, percussion), and Jon Light Klages (lead guitar, keyboards, vocals). They were an outgrowth of several jam sessions that also included, at various times, Bernie Kugel (The Good, Mystic Eyes), and Dee Pop (The Gun Club, Bush Tetras). The band played regularly at Maxwell's and were a central part of the early 1980s Hoboken music scene. Village Voice critic Robert Christgau called them "easily the best of En Why's Pop Three on stage [the other two being the Bongos and the dB's], scruffy and forceful and lithe".

Their debut EP, Aquamarine, was produced by the dB's Gene Holder. It was voted one of the best EPs of 1981 in the Village Voice's annual Pazz & Jop critics' poll. The band's one album, Fields, was also produced by Holder and engineered by Mitch Easter. While Christgau criticized their lyrics as "lack[ing] that universal touch", critic Robert Palmer, writing in The New York Times in May 1982, called Fields "remarkably mature" and "the most impressive rock debut so far this year." Fields featured the minor college radio hit "Dancing With My Eighty Wives".

The Individuals broke up in 1983. Morrow then formed the band Rage To Live and later went on to help found Bar/None Records, while Janet Wygal and her brother Doug went on to form The Wygals, and Janet Wygal later formed the group Splendora, which provided the theme music for MTV's show Daria. After The Wygals split up, Doug played on albums by Wanda Jackson, Laura Cantrell, Amy Rigby, Wreckless Eric and others.

Both Fields and the Aquamarine EP were reissued, along with four other bonus tracks, on Bar/None Records on July 22, 2008.

== Discography ==
- Aquamarine E.P. (Infidelity \ Lust/Unlust 1981)
- Fields (Plexus 1982)
