= Working Undercover for the Man =

EP by They Might Be Giants
- Released: May 16, 2000
- Genre: Alternative rock
- Length: 12:26
- Label: eMusic

They Might Be Giants chronology
Long Tall Weekend (1999)	Working Undercover for the Man (2000)	Mink Car (2001)

Professional ratings
Review scores
Source	Rating
AllMusic	2/5 stars
Pitchfork Media	(6.1/10)

Working Undercover for the Man is an EP by American alternative rock band They Might Be Giants, released as an MP3-only album through eMusic. However, 10,000 physical copies were pressed. The EP is named after their song of the same name, which was later included on Mink Car. The EP is now available on the iTunes Store.

== Track listing ==
No.	Title	Length
1.	"Rest Awhile"	1:40
2.	"Working Undercover For The Man"	2:19
3.	"I Am A Human Head"	2:51
4.	"Empty Bottle Collector"	1:38
5.	"On The Drag"	2:18
6.	"Radio They Might Be Giants 1"	0:09
7.	"Radio They Might Be Giants 2"	0:16
8.	"Radio They Might Be Giants 3"	0:12
9.	"Robot Parade (Adult Version)"	1:05
Total length:		12:26
