= This Perfect World =

Studio album by Freedy Johnston
- Released: June 28, 1994
- Studio: Smart (Madison, Wisconsin)
- Genre: Alternative rock, power pop
- Length: 40:14
- Label: Elektra
- Producer: Butch Vig

Freedy Johnston chronology
Can You Fly (1992)	This Perfect World (1994)	Never Home (1997)

Professional ratings
Review scores
Source	Rating
AllMusic	4/5 stars
Christgau's Consumer Guide	(3-star Honorable Mention)
Entertainment Weekly	A
Los Angeles Times	3/4 stars
Rolling Stone	4/5 stars
The Rolling Stone Album Guide	4/5 stars
Spin Alternative Record Guide	8/10

This Perfect World is the third album by singer-songwriter Freedy Johnston. It was released in 1994 on Elektra Records.

It is an album steeped in regret and loss. The narrator of "Across the Avenue" is unable to get past the memory of seeing his lover killed in a pedestrian accident. In "Two Lovers Stop," a young couple commit suicide rather than let themselves be ripped away from each other. The title track concerns a dying old man returning to apologize to his estranged daughter for unspecified past misdeeds. Among the other songs, "Evie's Tears" apparently refers to sexual abuse (evidently by a priest), and "Dolores" is based on Nabokov's Lolita. Despite the preponderance of dark subject matter, the album has a jaunty feel as Johnston demonstrates an ability to craft winning pop melodies.

Reviews of the album were overflowing with praise, although those same reviewers also generally felt that it didn't quite measure up to his previous album, 1992's Can You Fly.

This Perfect World was produced by Butch Vig, who also played on the album's minor hit, "Bad Reputation." Other notable contributors include cellist Jane Scarpantoni, who performed on two tracks, and Marshall Crenshaw.

== Track listing ==
All songs written by Freedy Johnston.

1. "Bad Reputation" – 4:08
2. "Evie's Tears" – 3:01
3. "Can't Sink This Town" – 3:52
4. "This Perfect World" – 4:35
5. "Cold Again" – 2:37
6. "Two Lovers Stop" – 2:46
7. "Across the Avenue" – 3:29
8. "Gone Like the Water" – 2:44
9. "Dolores" – 3:43
10. "Evie's Garden" – 2:54
11. "Disappointed Man" – 3:15
12. "I Can Hear the Laughs" – 3:10

== Personnel ==
- Freedy Johnston – vocals, acoustic guitar, electric guitar
- Graham Maby – bass guitar
- Frank Vilardi – drums
- Kevin Salem – rhythm guitar, lead guitar (tracks 3, 7, 9 & 11)
- Dave Schramm – lead guitar, 6-string bass, lap steel guitar (tracks 1, 3, 6 & 9–11)
- Marc Ribot – lead guitar (tracks 2, 4, 5 & 7)
- Marshall Crenshaw – Twelve-string guitar (track 2)
- Mark Spencer – guitar (track 8 & 12)
- Butch Vig – percussion, drums (tracks 1 & 12)
- John Yates – bass (track 1)
- Jane Scarpantoni – cello (tracks 4 & 10)
- Mary Gaines – background vocals (tracks 3 & 5)
- Doug Erikson – piano (track 2)
