= The Art of Shaving =

American male grooming retailer

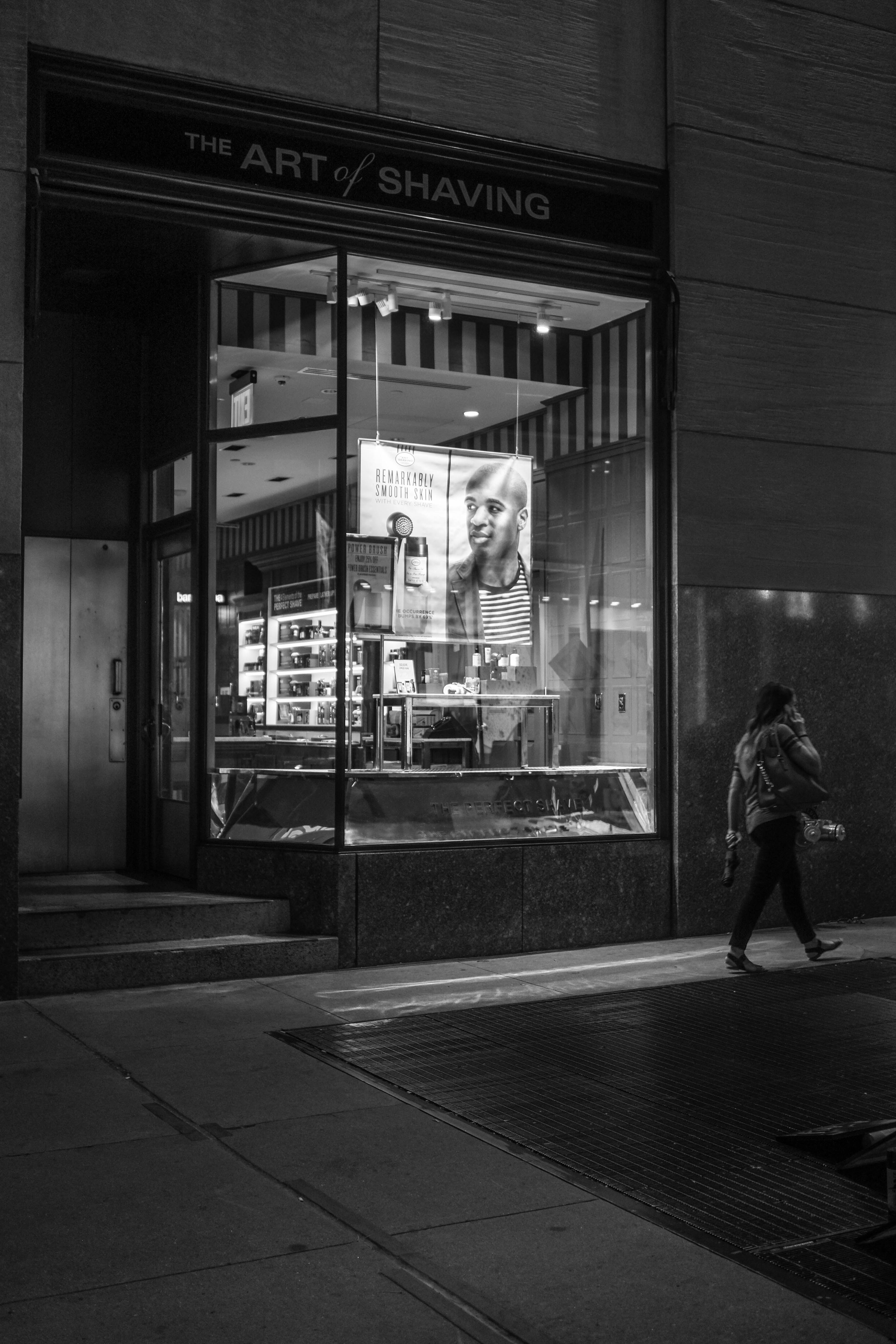
- Company type: Subsidiary
- Industry: Shaving products
- Founded: 1996; 30 years ago
- Founders: Eric Malka; Myriam Zaoui
- Headquarters: New York City, New York, U.S.
- Parent: Procter & Gamble (2009–present)
- Website: www.theartofshaving.com theartofshaving.ca

The Art of Shaving is a United States retail business of high-end men's shaving and skin care accessories. The first store was founded by Eric Malka and Myriam Zaoui in Manhattan in 1996.

The store was successful and opened a second shop on Madison Avenue. The brand developed a line of natural shaving products. The company grew to have stores in the United States, Canada, United Arab Emirates, Qatar, and Russia. The company entered a partnership with razor company Gillette with some The Art of Shaving franchises owned by Gillette.

Procter & Gamble purchased The Art of Shaving in 2009. It was announced in January 2020 that parent company Procter & Gamble planned to close "most" stores due to a decline in mall traffic and changing consumer shopping habits The company closed its last physical location in Orlando, Florida on January 2, 2024.
