= Suburban Primitive =

Studio album by The Original Sins
- Released: 1997
- Recorded: Summer 1997 at Cherokee Street Studios
- Genre: Garage rock
- Length: 29:05 (LP); 40:03 (CD)
- Label: Blood Red Vinyl & Discs
- Producer: John Terlesky

The Original Sins chronology
Bethlehem (1996)	Suburban Primitive (1997)

Professional ratings
Review scores
Source	Rating
AllMusic	3/5 stars

Suburban Primitive is the ninth and final studio album by garage rock band The Original Sins, which was released in 1997 through Blood Red Vinyl & Discs. The album features the return of Dave Ferrara, the band's original drummer. The album was released on 10" vinyl and CD formats. The photograph shown on the front cover was provided by John Terlesky's parents.

The band broke up in 1998, only a couple of months after the album's release. According to an interview with Terlesky, Ken Bussiere moved to Florida to play in oldies cover bands, Seth Baer left for school, and Dan McKinney opened his very own recording studio.

== Track listing ==
All tracks are written by John Terlesky.

Side One
No.	Title	Length
1.	"Kill The Buddha"	2:48
2.	"Making Up For Lost Time"	3:22
3.	"Ain't Got Me Down"	3:00
4.	"Easier Done Than Said"	3:00

Side Two
No.	Title	Length
5.	"Wonderbra"	3:54
6.	"Constellation"	5:02
7.	"Like You Like It"	3:03
8.	"Wanna Be You"	4:56

CD Version Track Listing
No.	Title	Length
1.	"Kill The Buddha"	2:48
2.	"Making Up For Lost Time"	3:22
3.	"Ain't Got Me Down"	3:00
4.	"Easier Done Than Said"	3:00
5.	"Constellation"	5:02
6.	"Wonderbra"	3:54
7.	"Like You Like It"	3:03
8.	"Song With No Words"	4:02
9.	"Go Dan!"	3:25
10.	"Wanna Be You"	4:56
11.	"???"	3:31

== Personnel ==
- John Terlesky - Vocals, guitar
- Ken Bussiere - Bass
- Dan McKinney - Keyboards, recording
- Dave Ferrara - Drums
- Corey Larkin - Background vocals
- Jim Shirock - Backing vocals
- Stacy Shirock - Backing vocals
- Kenn Micheal - Photography
