= P.J. Pacifico =

American singer-songwriter (born 1972)

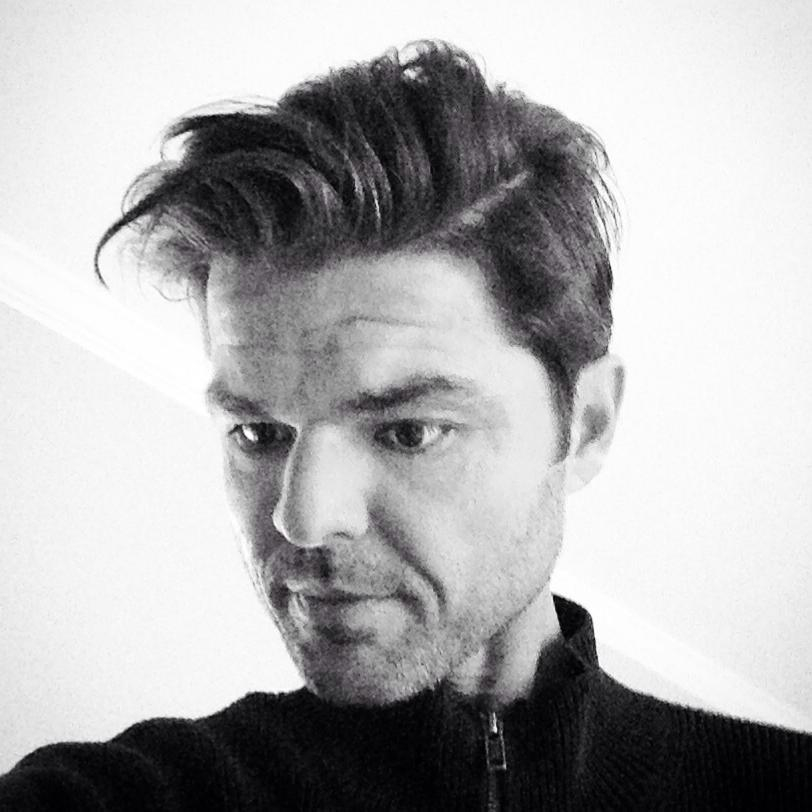

Background information
- Born: November 5, 1972 (age 54)
- Origin: Norwalk, CT
- Genres: Rock, Pop, singer-songwriter
- Occupation: Singer-songwriter
- Instruments: vocals, guitar, drums
- Years active: 2006–present
- Label: Viper Records
- Website: www.pjpacifico.com

P.J. Pacifico (born Paul Joseph Pacifico) is an American singer-songwriter. He has released a number of solo albums on Viper Records in the styles of rock, pop, hip hop and folk. He tours frequently and his music is generally in an introspective and emotional style.

He released his latest EP, Ready To Run, in 2015 and it was co-written by Pacifico, Garrison Starr and AG, with Starr and AG as co-producers.

Pacifico signed a music licensing deal with to Razor & Tie Music Publishing in 2015.

== Viper Records ==
After graduating with an acting degree from the University Of Hartford, Pacifico began writing songs and eventually recorded several demos which were heard by Jonathan Stuart at Viper Records in New York City. He eventually signed with Viper Records in 2004. He released a ukulele cover of the Beatles' "I Want to Hold Your Hand" as his first single in 2006 and gained airplay on SiriusXM's The Coffeehouse.

=== Outlet (2011) ===
Pacifico released Outlet, on June 7, 2011. Outlet was his first album with Dave O'Donnell (Eric Clapton, James Taylor) on board as a producer. Outlet received a positive review in Blogcritics, with Jack Goodstein stating "When singer-songwriter P.J. Pacifico is at his best there is a heartfelt honesty to his music. There is a palatable flow of emotions that seems at once spontaneous and completely sincere." According to M Magazine about Outlet, he is "part James Taylor, part Duncan Sheik,".

=== Surface (2012) ===
Outlet was followed on September 25, 2012, by the full album Surface. One of the tracks is a cover of Christopher Cross' "Sailing," which was praised by Blogcritics in a mixed review that said the album had a darker sound and outlook than his previous releases. Wildy's World gave the album a positive review and 4.5/5 stars, calling it his "finest work to date." Andy Abel produced the album.

=== Overlooking the Obvious (2013) ===
He released the EP Overlooking the Obvious on November 5, 2013. The EP featured a new studio and producer, and had a co-write with Stephen Kellogg. Two songs were written with Garrison Starr, while Kit Karlson of the band SK6ers also co-wrote a track and produced the album. Contributing guest musicians included members of the SK6ers and Connecticut band The Alternate Routes. It has guest musicians from The Stepkids as well.

He recorded a Daytrotter session in 2013.

=== "Gin & Juice" and "Reaching" (2014) ===
In 2014, he and Garrison Starr completed a cover of Snoop Dogg's "Gin and Juice" and released a video for it, along with putting it on an acoustic EP called Amsterdam. In the same year, he released a single called "Reaching", co-written with Shannon McArthur and produced by LA producer, Bill Lefler.

=== Ready To Run (2015) ===
After a series of writing trips to LA and Nashville in late 2014, the Ready To Run EP was released on May 5, 2015. The EP was co-produced by Garrison Starr and AG, and the five songs were all co-written by Pacifico, Garrison Starr and AG. It was this group of songs that led to P.J. signing a licensing deal with Razor & Tie Music Publishing in April 2015. The first song on the EP, "All For Something", was featured in an episode of Switched at Birth on ABC Family and Heartland in Canada on CBC.

=== "Anything Is Possible" (2015) ===
A Nashville co-writing session between Pacifico, Gerald O'Brien and Jason Watkins produced a song called "Anything Is Possible". The song would be released as a single after getting multiple TV placements on FOX TV's So You Think You Can Dance. It was used in multiple farewell video montages for the eliminated dancers.

=== "Run (Sport Edit)" (2016) ===
A Los Angeles co-writing session with Dan Whit led to the recording and placement of the song "Run (Sports Edit)" in an episode of HBO's Hard Knocks in 2016.

== Signals in Smoke ==
Signals in Smoke is an American band made up of P.J. Pacifico and Valerie Broussard whose debut single, "Coming Up For Air", premiered on Grey's Anatomy, skyrocketing the single to #1 on the iTunes Singer/Songwriter Chart. The song has also been featured on Spotify's New Music Friday and the US Viral 50 Chart. The song has also appeared on an episode of Legacies as well.
