= Long Tall Weekend =

Studio album by They Might Be Giants
- Released: July 19, 1999
- Recorded: 1991 ("The Edison Museum"), 1994–1999
- Studios: Studio 4 (Philadelphia); Kampo (New York City); River Sound (New York City); Coyote (Brooklyn); Studio G (Brooklyn); Hello (Brooklyn); Collyer Brothers (Brooklyn)
- Genre: Alternative rock
- Length: 34:31
- Label: eMusic
- Producers: Pat Dillett, They Might Be Giants

They Might Be Giants chronology
Severe Tire Damage (1998)	Long Tall Weekend (1999)	Working Undercover for the Man (2000)

Alternate cover
- Cover of the 2023 vinyl release

Long Tall Weekend is the seventh studio album by American alternative rock band They Might Be Giants, released in 1999. It was released exclusively online through the digital music service eMusic. The album was the band's first since their departure from the major label Elektra. Long Tall Weekend was also the first full-length album released exclusively on the Internet by an established major label band. Although the album's primary release was digital, CDs of the album were issued promotionally. Following the success of the album's release through eMusic, TMBG went on to issue a digital series of rarities collections, like TMBG Unlimited, through their website.

== Song origins ==
Many of the songs that appear on Long Tall Weekend existed as demos and selections from the band's Dial-A-Song service. "Drinkin'" was originally written six years prior to the release of the album. "Maybe I Know" had been in TMBG setlists since the 1980s. Many songs were intended for release in different forms on later albums. "She Thinks She's Edith Head" and "Older" resurfaced on Mink Car in 2001. The next year, "Rat Patrol", "Token Back to Brooklyn", "Reprehensible", "Certain People I Could Name" and "They Got Lost" appeared on the rarities compilation album They Got Lost, and "The Edison Museum" appeared on No!. "The Edison Museum" was originally written and recorded in 1991 and featured on the Edisongs compilation that year. The recorded version appearing on Long Tall Weekend is largely the same as the Edisongs version, though the mixing varies.

Some songs, such as "They Got Lost" and "Lullabye to Nightmares" had also existed in different forms prior to the release of Long Tall Weekend. The former was a live track with a much faster tempo from the band's live compilation Severe Tire Damage (1998).

"They Got Lost" and "Certain People I Could Name" were both originally slated for inclusion on Factory Showroom (1996).

== Reception ==
Professional ratings
Review scores
Source	Rating
AllMusic	link
The A.V. Club	(mixed) link
CMJ	(favorable) link
Pitchfork Media	(7.6/10) link
Robert Christgau	A− link
Spin	(favorable) link

Following the digital release of Long Tall Weekend, They Might Be Giants became the most downloaded band of 1999. John Flansburgh speculates that the feat was based not only on the content of the album, but also on the band's early willingness to embrace digital formats, having been urged to do so by the Restless Records label.

== Track listing ==
All tracks are written by They Might Be Giants, except where noted.

No.	Title	Writer(s)	Length
1.	"Drinkin'"		1:36
2.	"(She Thinks She's) Edith Head"		2:33
3.	"Maybe I Know"	Jeff Barry, Ellie Greenwich	2:07
4.	"Rat Patrol"		2:07
5.	"Token Back to Brooklyn"		1:04
6.	"Older"		1:57
7.	"Operators Are Standing By"		1:24
8.	"Dark and Metric"		1:44
9.	"Reprehensible"		3:20
10.	"Certain People I Could Name"		3:33
11.	"Counterfeit Faker"		2:15
12.	"They Got Lost"		4:42
13.	"Lullabye to Nightmares"		2:31
14.	"On Earth My Nina"		1:27
15.	"The Edison Museum"	Brian Dewan, They Might Be Giants	2:00
16.	"Dr. Evil (vinyl and streaming bonus track)"		1:49

== Personnel ==
Credits adapted from 1999 PDF liner notes.

They Might Be Giants

- John Linnell – bass saxophone (1), piano (2), organ (3–4, 7), harmony vocal (3), vocal (4, 6, 8, 10, 12, 14), keyboards (6, 8, 10, 12, 15), clarinet (9), horns (9), bass guitar (11), banjo (11), fiddle (11), baritone saxophone (13)
- John Flansburgh – baritone guitar (1), vocal (2–5, 7, 9, 11, 13), acoustic guitar (2, 11), electric guitar (4, 6, 10, 12)

Additional musicians

- Graham Maby – bass guitar (1, 3–4, 7–10, 12)
- Brian Doherty – drums (1, 3–4, 7–10, 12–13)
- Dan Miller – electric guitars (2, 6)
- Danny Weinkauf – bass guitar (2, 6)
- Dan Hickey – drums (2, 6)
- Eric Schermerhorn – electric guitar (4, 12), acoustic guitar solo (11)
- Yuval Gabay – drums (5)
- Jay Sherman-Godfrey – slide guitar (8), cello (11)
- Kurt Hoffman – tenor saxophone (13)
- Frank London – trumpet (13)
- Tony Maimone – guitar (13)
- Nick Hill – vocal (15)

Technical

- Patrick Dillett – producer
- They Might Be Giants – producers
- Annette Berry – design
- Michael Kupperman – illustrations
