= Freedy Johnston =

American singer-songwriter

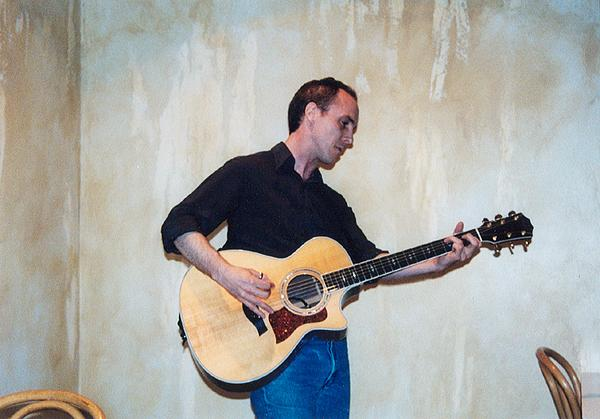
- Freedy Johnston in Wichita, Kansas (1998)

Background information
- Born: Frederic John Fatzer; 1961 (age 64–65)
- Origin: Kinsley, Kansas
- Genres: Alternative rock, Americana
- Occupations: Musician, singer-songwriter
- Instruments: Voice, guitar
- Years active: 1989–present
- Labels: Bar/None; Elektra
- Website: www.freedyjohnston.com

Freedy Johnston (born Frederic John Fatzer in 1961) is an American singer-songwriter based in New York City.

From Kinsley, Kansas, Johnston's songs are often about troubled loners, and cover topics like heartbreak, alienation, and disappointment. Known for his songcraft, he has been described as a "songwriter's songwriter".

== Early life ==
Johnston was raised in the small town of Kinsley, Kansas. His interest in music was hampered by the fact that there were no record shops or music stores in his hometown. When he was 16, he bought his first guitar from a mail-order catalog, and at 17 had a friend drive him 35 miles to the nearest record store to buy an Elvis Costello album he had read about. When he graduated high school, and left to attend the University of Kansas in Lawrence, Kansas, he immersed himself in the new wave music scene there.

== Music career ==
Johnston moved to New York City in 1985. With the typing skills he had acquired in high school, he supported himself in New York as an office worker at an architecture firm for a number of years as well as in the restaurant industry, prior to pursuing music on a full-time basis. He decided to change his name to Freedy Johnston, as "Freedy" was a nickname that his mother had given him, and Johnston was his mother's maiden name. After a few years in New York, he signed with independent label Bar/None Records, who debuted two of his songs on a sampler called Time for a Change (1989). Bar/None released Johnston's first album, The Trouble Tree in 1990. While the reviews were generally favorable, the album was not commercially successful.

Johnston sold some of his family's farmland to finance the recording of his second album, Can You Fly (an event he wrote about in the opening track on that album, "Trying to Tell You I Don't Know"). The album, released in 1992, was selected by The New York Times as one of the best albums of the year. Johnston followed up with his 1994 major label debut, This Perfect World, released on Elektra Records and produced by Butch Vig of Garbage. The album received positive reviews and led to Rolling Stone naming Johnston "songwriter of the year." Other publications, including The New York Times, Spin, and Musician Magazine, gave the album high marks as well. It featured the single "Bad Reputation", which reached 54 on the Billboard Hot 100 and is one of his best-known songs. He released his next three albums under Elektra: Never Home (produced by Danny Kortchmar), Blue Days Black Nights (produced by T-Bone Burnett), and Right Between the Promises.

Johnston and fellow musicians Jay Moran, James "Pie" Cowan, Duke Erikson, and Butch Vig perform occasional shows as a covers band called the Know-it-All Boyfriends. Vig established the ensemble for his brother's Christmas party, and it soon became an ongoing venture.

Johnston's songs appear on the soundtrack albums for Kingpin (1996), Things to Do in Denver When You're Dead (1995), Heavy (1995), and Kicking and Screaming (1995). He later recorded a cover of the folk song "Peg and Awl" for Ed Pettersen and Janet Reno's Song of America compilation of 2007. In early 2008, he released his own album of covers, My Favorite Waste of Time, followed by a new studio album, Rain on the City, in January 2010.

In the late 2000s, Johnston began playing and writing songs with another singer-songwriter, Jon Dee Graham. The two were preparing to record an album when they saw Susan Cowsill perform at the 2009 South by Southwest festival in Austin, Texas. They invited her to join the project, and as a trio wrote and recorded the studio album At Least We Have Each Other (Freedom Records, 2012), under the name The Hobart Brothers and Lil' Sis Hobart.

== Discography ==
=== Solo ===
- The Trouble Tree (1990)
- Can You Fly (1992)
- Unlucky (1993)
- This Perfect World (1994)
- Never Home (1997)
- Blue Days Black Nights (1999)
- Live at 33 1/3 (2000)
- Right Between the Promises (2001)
- The Way I Were: 4-Track Demos, 1986–1992 (2004)
- Live at McCabe's Guitar Shop (2006)
- My Favorite Waste of Time (2007)
- Rain on the City (2010)
- Neon Repairman (2015)
- Back On The Road To You (2022)

=== Contributions ===
- Earn Enough For Us, an XTC cover, the opening track of the 1995 album A Testimonial Dinner: The Songs of XTC
- The Jazz Passengers, In Love (High Street/Windham Hill, 1994); vocals on "Your Ambivalence"
- Real: The Tom T. Hall Project, Track 5: “Coffee, Coffee, Coffee” (Sire Records, 1998)
