= Bar/None Records =

American independent record label

- Founded: 1986
- Founder: Tom Prendergast; Glenn Morrow
- Distributors: Alternative Distribution Alliance, Secretly Distribution
- Genre: Alternative rock Indie rock Folk
- Country of origin: United States
- Location: Hoboken, New Jersey
- Official website: www.bar-none.com

Bar/None Records is an independent record label based in Hoboken, New Jersey,and founded in 1986. As of 2019, there have been over 100 bands that have signed to the label.

== Early history ==
Tom Prendergast started Bar/None in early 1986 in Hoboken, New Jersey. The first release on Bar/None was by Rage to Live, whose leader, Glenn Morrow, soon became a partner in the label. Morrow had already built a network of contacts in the alternative music community having toured nationally with his previous band, The Individuals, and had also worked in the A&R department of Warner Bros. and as the managing editor of New York Rocker magazine. In 2000, Prendergast left New Jersey and moved back to Ireland, sold his shares to Morrow.

Artists that started on Bar/None and went on to the major record labels include They Might Be Giants (Elektra), Yo La Tengo (Atlantic/Matador), Freedy Johnston, Luka Bloom, and Tindersticks (London/PolyGram).

== Artists (past and present) ==
As of 2019, there have been over 120 artists signed to Bar/None Records.

== See also ==
- List of record labels

== Sources ==
- Bar/None Records Staff (2019), "Full Catalog", Bar/None Records
