= List of Irish Independent Albums Chart number-one albums =

This is a list of number one-albums of the Irish Independent Albums Chart.

- List of Irish Independent Albums Chart number ones of 2010
- List of Irish Independent Albums Chart number ones of 2011
- List of Irish Independent Albums Chart number ones of 2012
- List of Irish Independent Albums Chart number ones of 2013
- List of Irish Independent Albums Chart number ones of 2014
- List of Irish Independent Albums Chart number ones of 2015
- List of Irish Independent Albums Chart number ones of 2016
- List of Irish Independent Albums Chart number ones of 2017
- List of Irish Independent Albums Chart number ones of 2018
- List of Irish Independent Albums Chart number ones of 2019
- List of Irish Independent Albums Chart number ones of 2020
- List of Irish Independent Albums Chart number ones of 2021
- List of Irish Independent Albums Chart number ones of 2022
- List of Irish Independent Albums Chart number ones of 2023

== See also ==
- List of number-one albums (Ireland)
