= List of Irish Independent Albums Chart number ones of 2015 =

This is a list of albums that reached number-one on the Irish Independent Albums Chart in 2015. The charts were compiled by GfK's Chart-Track on behalf of the Irish Recorded Music Association (IRMA).

== Chart history ==
List of Irish Independent Albums Chart number-one albums of 2015
Issue date	Album	Artist	Label	Ref
1 January	AM	Arctic Monkeys	Domino	
8 January	My Favourite Faded Fantasy	Damien Rice	DRM	
15 January	The Wests Awake	Tommy Fleming	Beaumex	
22 January	Modern Blues	The Waterboys	Harlequinn and Crown	
29 January	This Chemical Sea	Jape	Faction	
5 February	The West's Awake	Tommy Fleming	Beaumex	
12 February	The West's Awake	Tommy Fleming	Beaumex	
19 February	The West's Awake	Tommy Fleming	Beaumex	
26 February	The West's Awake	Tommy Fleming	Beaumex	
5 March	Chasing Yesterday	Noel Gallagher's High Flying Birds	Sour Mash	
12 March	Chasing Yesterday	Noel Gallagher's High Flying Birds	Sour Mash	
19 March	Chasing Yesterday	Noel Gallagher's High Flying Birds	Sour Mash	
26 March	Chasing Yesterday	Noel Gallagher's High Flying Birds	Sour Mash	
2 April	The Day Is My Enemy	The Prodigy	Cooking Vinyl	
9 April	Future Hearts	All Time Low	Hopeless	
16 April	Darling Arithmetic	Villagers	Domino	
23 April	Stories from the Surface	Ham Sandwich	Route 109A	
30 April	The Vicar St. Sessions Vol.1	Paul Brady	Proper	
7 May	Stories from the Surface	Ham Sandwich	Route 109A	
14 May	Darling Arithmetic	Villagers	Domino	
21 May	Fight Like Apes	Fight Like Apes	Alcopop!	
28 May	Sol Invictus	Faith No More	Reclamation/Ipecac	
4 June	In Colour	Jamie xx	Young Turks	
11 June	In Colour	Jamie xx	Young Turks	
18 June	Look Away Down Collins Avenue	Drays	Indalo Audio	
25 June	In Colour	Jamie xx	Young Turks	
2 July	Still	Richard Thompson	Proper	
9 July	Chasing Yesterday	Noel Gallagher's High Flying Birds	Sour Mash	
16 July	Chasing Yesterday	Noel Gallagher's High Flying Birds	Sour Mash	
23 July	Chasing Yesterday	Noel Gallagher's High Flying Birds	Sour Mash	
30 July	VII: Sturm und Drang	Lamb of God	Nuclear Blast	
6 August	Unearthed	Na Fianna	Trad Nu	
13 August	Another One	Mac DeMarco	Captured Tracks	
20 August	AM	Arctic Monkeys	Domino	
27 August	The Gloaming	The Gloaming	Real World	
3 September	Here and Now	Ryan Sheridan	Rubyworks	
10 September	One Good Night	Derek Ryan	Sharpe Music	
17 September	One Good Night	Derek Ryan	Sharpe Music	
24 September	Didn't He Ramble	Glen Hansard	Anti	
1 October	Joyland	Keywest	Sonic Realm	
8 October	Joyland	Keywest	Sonic Realm	
15 October	Joyland	Keywest	Sonic Realm	
22 October	Joyland	Keywest	Sonic Realm	
29 October	Divers	Joanna Newsom	Drag City	
5 November	Return to the Moon	EL VY	4AD	
12 November	The Hank Williams Songbook	Daniel O'Donnell	Rosette	
19 November	The Hank Williams Songbook	Daniel O'Donnell	Rosette	
26 November	25	Adele	XL	
3 December	25	Adele	XL	
10 December	25	Adele	XL	
17 December	25	Adele	XL	
24 December	25	Adele	XL	
31 December	25	Adele	XL	

== See also ==
- List of number-one albums of 2015 (Ireland)
- List of number-one singles of 2015 (Ireland)
