= List of Irish Independent Albums Chart number ones of 2016 =

This is a list of albums that reached number-one on the Irish Independent Albums Chart in 2016. The charts were compiled by GfK's Chart-Track on behalf of the Irish Recorded Music Association (IRMA).

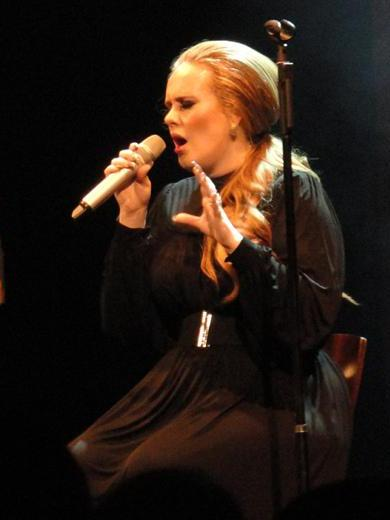
Adele's third album, 25, reached number one 27 non-consecutive weeks in 2016

== Chart history ==
List of Irish Independent Albums Chart number-one albums of 2016
Issue date	Album	Artist	Label	Ref
7 January	25	Adele	XL	
14 January	25	Adele	XL	
21 January	25	Adele	XL	
28 January	25	Adele	XL	
4 February	25	Adele	XL	
11 February	25	Adele	XL	
18 February	25	Adele	XL	
25 February	25	Adele	XL	
3 March	2	The Gloaming	Real World	
10 March	25	Adele	XL	
17 March	25	Adele	XL	
24 March	25	Adele	XL	
31 March	25	Adele	XL	
7 April	25	Adele	XL	
14 April	25	Adele	XL	
21 April	Cut Loose	Mike Denver	Sharpe Music	
28 April	25	Adele	XL	
5 May	25	Adele	XL	
12 May	A Moon Shaped Pool	Radiohead	XL	
19 May	Grace & Glory	High Kings	Celtic Collections	
26 May	Grace & Glory	High Kings	Celtic Collections	
2 June	25	Adele	XL	
9 June	25	Adele	XL	
16 June	25	Adele	XL	
23 June	A Moon Shaped Pool	Radiohead	XL	
30 June	25	Adele	XL	
7 July	25	Adele	XL	
14 July	25	Adele	XL	
21 July	Chaleur humaine	Christine and the Queens	Because Music	
28 July	25	Adele	XL	
4 August	Chaleur humaine	Christine and the Queens	Because Music	
11 August	Chaleur humaine	Christine and the Queens	Because Music	
18 August	Picture This EP	Picture This	Picture This	
25 August	At Swim	Lisa Hannigan	Play It Again Sam	
1 September	At Swim	Lisa Hannigan	Play It Again Sam	
8 September	We Move	James Vincent McMorrow	Believe/Faction	
15 September	Skeleton Tree	Nick Cave & the Bad Seeds	Bad Seed	
22 September	Skeleton Tree	Nick Cave & the Bad Seeds	Bad Seed	
29 September	Picture This EP	Picture This	Picture This	
6 October	22, A Million	Bon Iver	Jagjaguwar	
13 October	22, A Million	Bon Iver	Jagjaguwar	
20 October	Arms	Bell X1	BellyUp	
27 October	Happy Man	Derek Ryan	Sharpe Music	
3 November	25	Adele	XL	
10 November	Picture This EP	Picture This	Picture This	
17 November	25	Adele	XL	
24 November	Stories	Tommy Fleming	TF Productions	
1 December	Before the Dawn	Kate Bush	Fish People	
8 December	Before the Dawn	Kate Bush	Fish People	
15 December	Picture This EP	Picture This	Picture This	
22 December	25	Adele	XL	
29 December	25	Adele	XL	

== See also ==
- List of number-one albums of 2016 (Ireland)
- List of number-one singles of 2016 (Ireland)
