= List of Irish Independent Albums Chart number ones of 2010 =

This is a list of albums that reached number-one on the Irish Independent Albums Chart in 2010. The charts were compiled by GfK's Chart-Track on behalf of the Irish Recorded Music Association (IRMA).

== Chart history ==
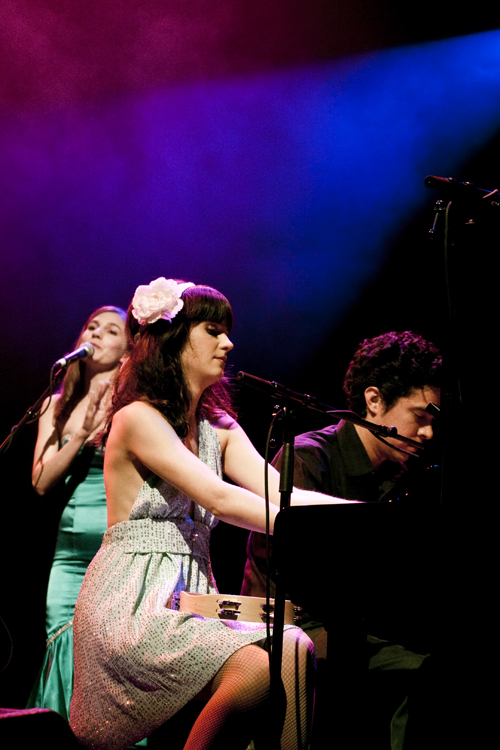
Volume Two by the American indie pop duo She & Him topped the chart in April 2010

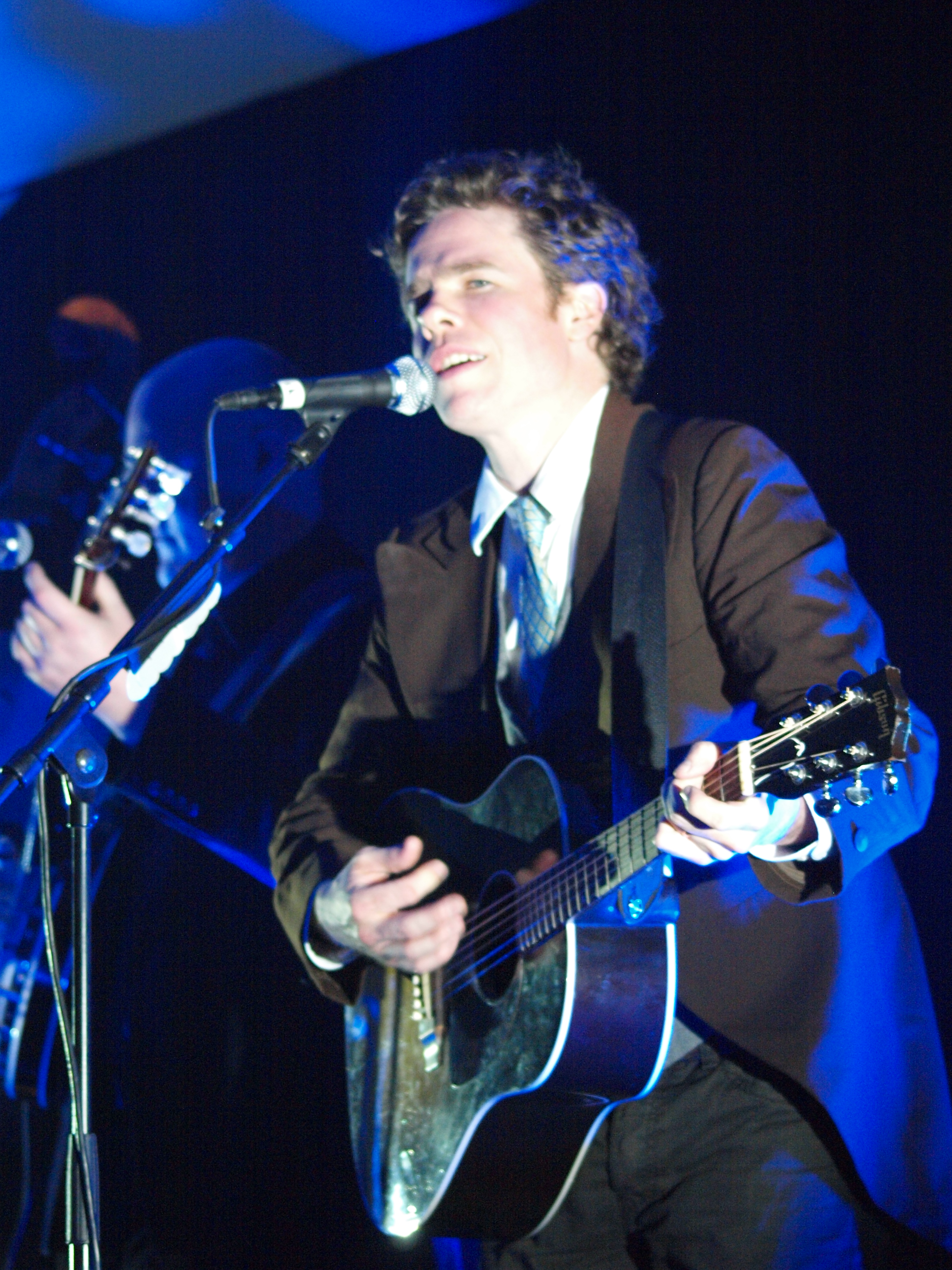
American singer-songwriter Josh Ritter reached number 1 in two consecutive weeks with So Runs the World Away

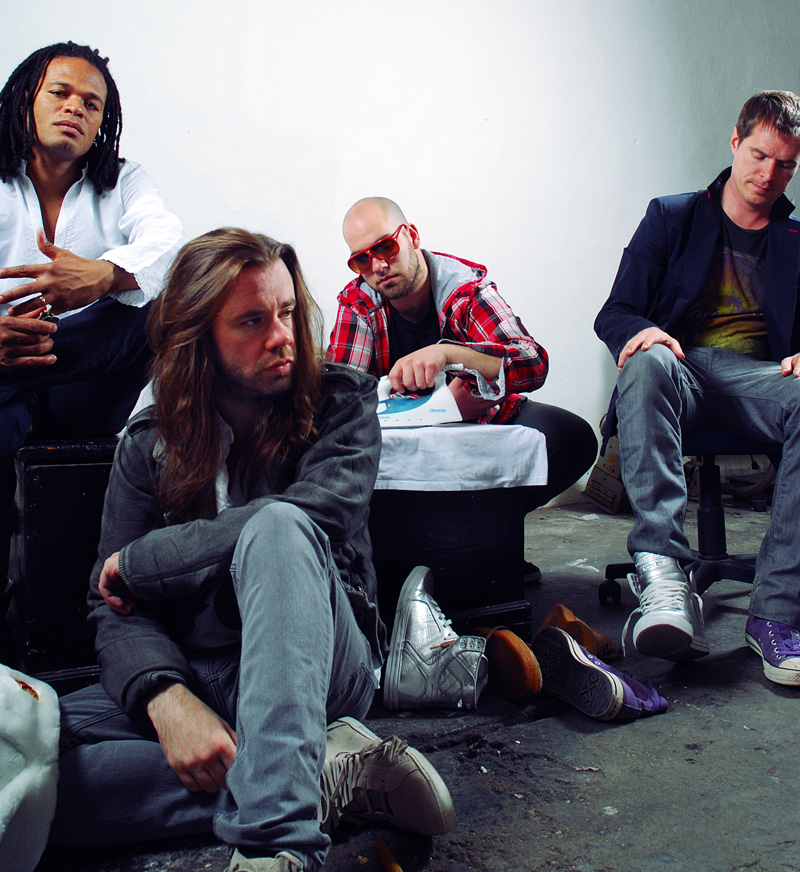
Irish funk rock band Republic of Loose's fourth studio album, Bounce at the Devil, went to number 1 in October 2010

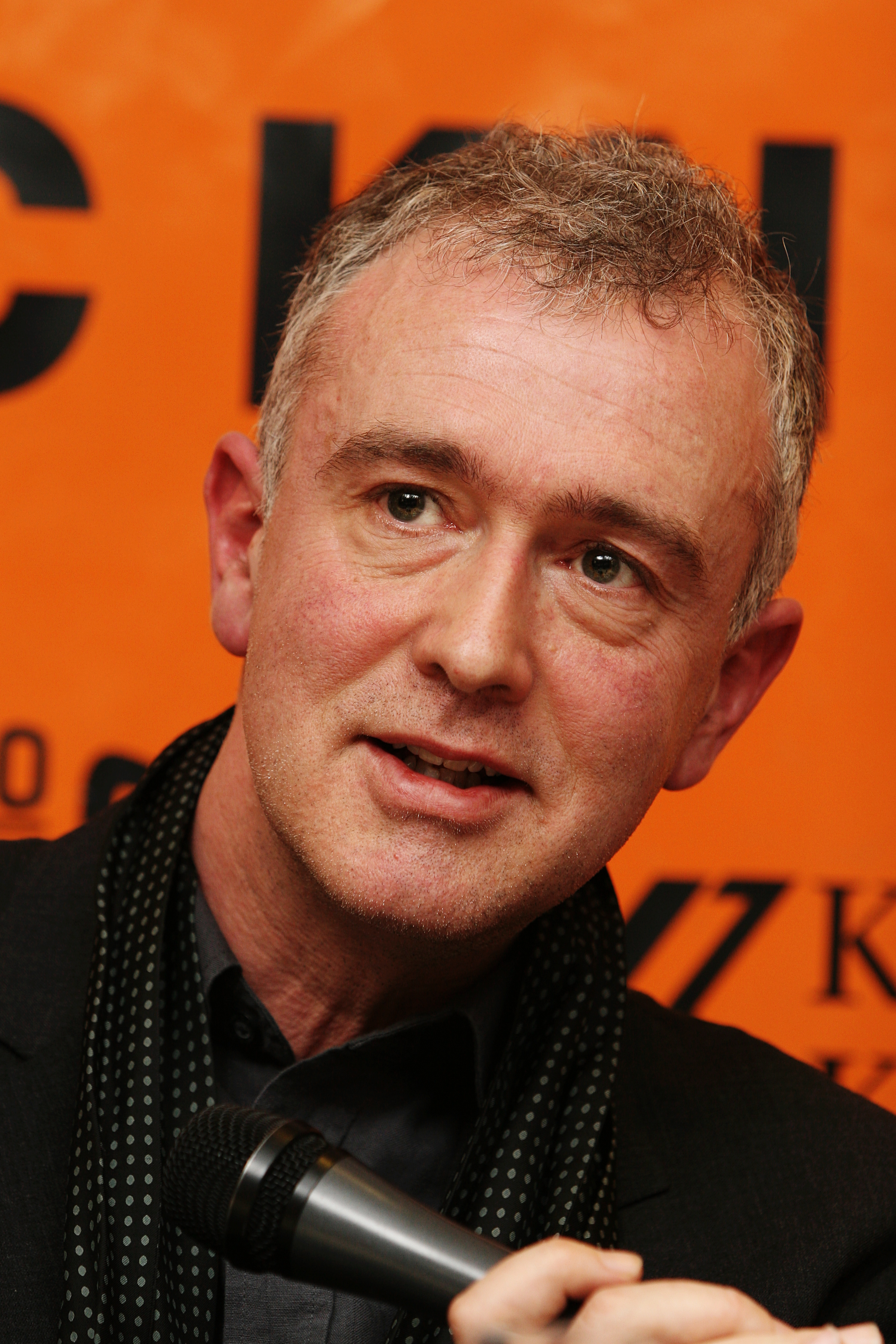
In October 2010, novelist Joseph O'Connor's spoken word album, The Drivetime Diaries, peaked at number 1

List of Irish Independent Albums Chart number-one albums of 2010
Issue date	Album	Artist	Label	Ref
1 January	Data unavailable			
8 January	Data unavailable			
15 January	Data unavailable			
22 January	Data unavailable			
29 January	Data unavailable			
5 February	Data unavailable			
12 February	Data unavailable			
19 February	Data unavailable			
26 February	Data unavailable			
5 March	Data unavailable			
12 March	Songs My Father Taught Me	Hemione Hennessy	H&I Music	
19 March	Songs My Father Taught Me	Hemione Hennessy	H&I Music	
26 March	Songs My Father Taught Me	Hemione Hennessy	H&I Music	
2 April	Songs My Father Taught Me	Hemione Hennessy	H&I Music	
9 April	Songs My Father Taught Me	Hemione Hennessy	H&I Music	
16 April	Volume Two	She & Him	Double Six	
23 April	Here, Not There	Heathers	Aunthill	
30 April	So Runs the World Away	Josh Ritter	Independent	
7 May	So Runs the World Away	Josh Ritter	Independent	
14 May	The Nameless	Cathy Davey	Hammer Toe	
21 May	Becoming a Jackal	Villagers	Domino	
28 May	Becoming a Jackal	Villagers	Domino	
4 June	Becoming a Jackal	Villagers	Domino	
11 June	Becoming a Jackal	Villagers	Domino	
18 June	American Slang	The Gaslight Anthem	SideOneDummy	
25 June	Becoming a Jackal	Villagers	Domino	
2 July	Won't Go Quietly	Example	Data	
9 July	The Nameless	Cathy Davey	Hammer Toe	
16 July	Tony Was an Ex-Con	The Coronas	3ú	
23 July	Tony Was an Ex-Con	The Coronas	3ú	
30 July	Tony Was an Ex-Con	The Coronas	3ú	
6 August	Tony Was an Ex-Con	The Coronas	3ú	
13 August	Tony Was an Ex-Con	The Coronas	3ú	
20 August	Tony Was an Ex-Con	The Coronas	3ú	
27 August	Tony Was an Ex-Con	The Coronas	3ú	
3 September	The Body of Christ and the Legs of Tina Turner	Fight Like Apes	Model Citizen	
10 September	xx	The xx	Young Turks	
17 September	xx	The xx	Young Turks	
24 September	The Further Adventures of... The Saw Doctors	The Saw Doctors	Shamtown	
1 October	Becoming a Jackal	Villagers	Domino	
8 October	Becoming a Jackal	Villagers	Domino	
15 October	Bounce at the Devil	Republic of Loose	Fish Don't Fear Nets	
22 October	The Drivetime Diaries	Joseph O'Connor	RTÉ	
29 October	Going Back	Tommy Fleming	RTÉ	
5 November	Going Back	Tommy Fleming	RTÉ	
12 November	Going Back	Tommy Fleming	RTÉ	
19 November	Going Back	Tommy Fleming	RTÉ	
26 November	Going Back	Tommy Fleming	RTÉ	
3 December	Going Back	Tommy Fleming	RTÉ	
10 December	Going Back	Tommy Fleming	RTÉ	
17 December	Going Back	Tommy Fleming	RTÉ	
24 December	Going Back	Tommy Fleming	RTÉ	
31 December	Going Back	Tommy Fleming	RTÉ	

== See also ==
- List of number-one albums of 2010 (Ireland)
- List of number-one singles of 2010 (Ireland)
