= List of Irish Independent Albums Chart number ones of 2014 =

This is a list of albums that reached number-one on the Irish Independent Albums Chart in 2014. The charts were compiled by GfK's Chart-Track on behalf of the Irish Recorded Music Association (IRMA).

== Chart history ==
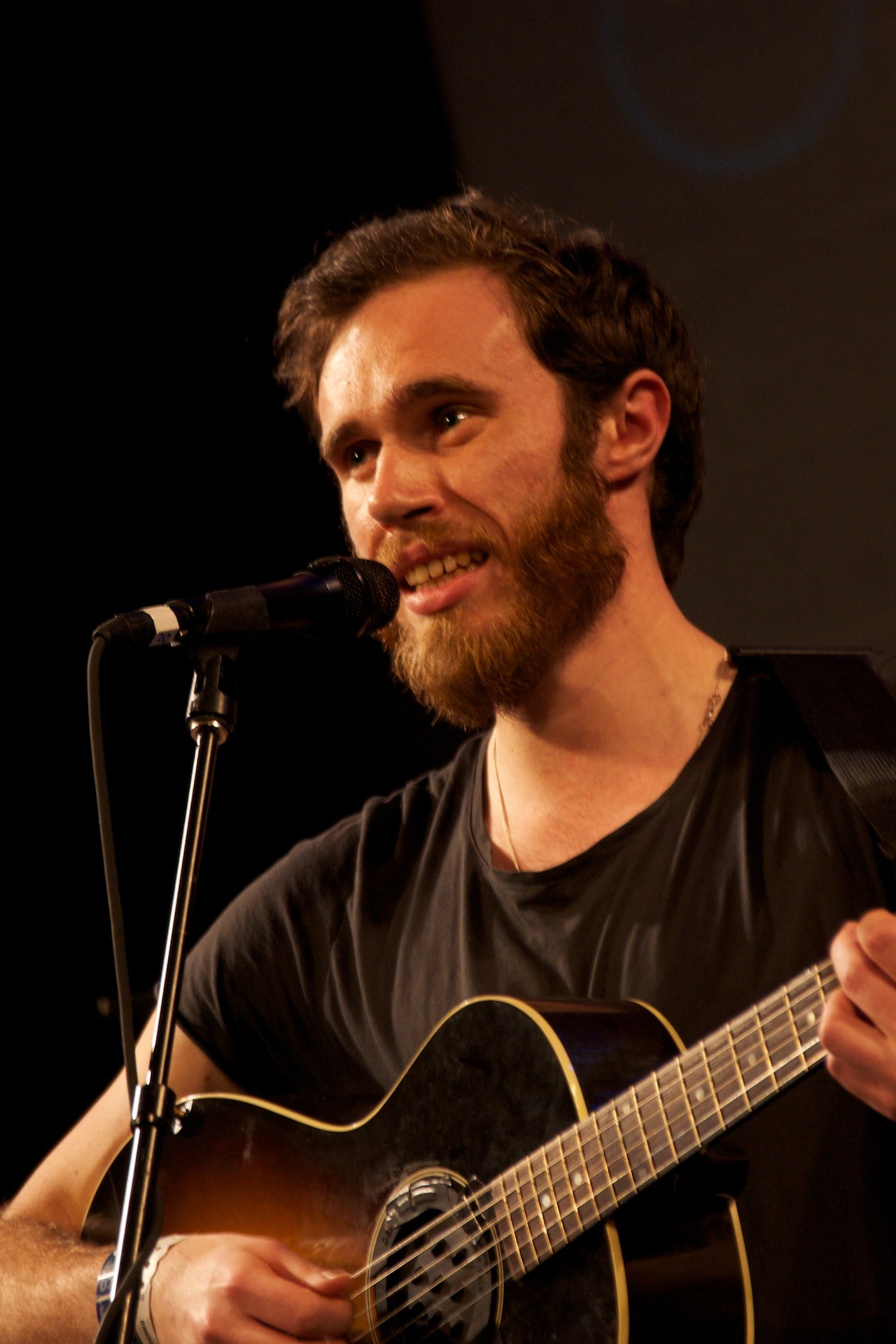
Post Tropical by James Vincent McMorrow (pictured in 2011) debuted at number one upon its release in January 2014

List of Irish Independent Albums Chart number-one albums of 2014
Issue date	Album	Artist	Label	Ref
3 January	AM	Arctic Monkeys	Domino	
10 January	AM	Arctic Monkeys	Domino	
17 January	Post Tropical	James Vincent McMorrow	Faction	
24 January	Post Tropical	James Vincent McMorrow	Faction	
31 January	The Gloaming	The Gloaming	Real World	
7 February	The Gloaming	The Gloaming	Real World	
14 February	If You Wait	London Grammar	Metal & Dust	
21 February	AM	Arctic Monkeys	Domino	
28 February	AM	Arctic Monkeys	Domino	
7 March	The Wagon Wheel Show - Live	Nathan Carter	Sharpe Music	
14 March	The Wagon Wheel Show - Live	Nathan Carter	Sharpe Music	
21 March	The Entertainer Live	Derek Ryan	Sharpe Music	
28 March	Raglans	Raglans	IRE	
4 April	The Wagon Wheel Show - Live	Nathan Carter	Sharpe Music	
11 April	The Wagon Wheel Show - Live	Nathan Carter	Sharpe Music	
18 April	Hymns of Passion and Resurrection	Celi De Collective	One By One	
25 April	The Cautionary Tales of Mark Oliver Everett	Eels	E Works	
2 May	Indie Cindy	Pixies	Pixies Music	
9 May	All We Are	O.R.B.	Gotta Run	
16 May	Ballroom Addicts	Big September	Hello Vinyl	
23 May	Definitely Maybe	Oasis	Big Brother	
30 May	Printer Clips	Printer Clips	Bone China	
6 June	The Wagon Wheel Show - Live	Nathan Carter	Sharpe Music	
13 June	Lazaretto	Jack White	XL	
20 June	Lazaretto	Jack White	XL	
27 June	Lazaretto	Jack White	XL	
3 July	Mutineers	David Gray	IHT	
10 July	Mutineers	David Gray	IHT	
17 July	AM	Arctic Monkeys	Domino	
24 July	AM	Arctic Monkeys	Domino	
31 July	AM	Arctic Monkeys	Domino	
7 August	AM	Arctic Monkeys	Domino	
14 August	I'm Not Bossy, I'm the Boss	Sinéad O'Connor	Nettwerk	
21 August	I'm Not Bossy, I'm the Boss	Sinéad O'Connor	Nettwerk	
28 August	I'm Not Bossy, I'm the Boss	Sinéad O'Connor	Nettwerk	
4 September	The Simple Things	Derek Ryan	Sharpe Music	
11 September	The Simple Things	Derek Ryan	Sharpe Music	
18 September	If You Wait	London Grammar	Metal & Dust	
25 September	This Is All Yours	Alt-J	Infectious	
2 October	This Is All Yours	Alt-J	Infectious	
9 October	Our Love	Caribou	City Slang	
16 October	The West's Awake	Tommy Fleming	Beaumex	
23 October	The West's Awake	Tommy Fleming	Beaumex	
30 October	The West's Awake	Tommy Fleming	Beaumex	
6 November	My Favourite Faded Fantasy	Damien Rice	DRM	
13 November	My Favourite Faded Fantasy	Damien Rice	DRM	
20 November	My Favourite Faded Fantasy	Damien Rice	DRM	
27 November	My Favourite Faded Fantasy	Damien Rice	DRM	
4 December	Live at Whelans	Gavin James	Believe	
11 December	The West's Awake	Tommy Fleming	Beaumex	
18 December	My Favourite Faded Fantasy	Damien Rice	DRM	
25 December	My Favourite Faded Fantasy	Damien Rice	DRM	

== See also ==
- List of number-one albums of 2014 (Ireland)
- List of number-one singles of 2014 (Ireland)
