= List of Irish Independent Albums Chart number ones of 2022 =

·

This is a list of albums that reached number-one on the Irish Independent Albums Chart in 2022. The charts were compiled by Irish Recorded Music Association (IRMA).

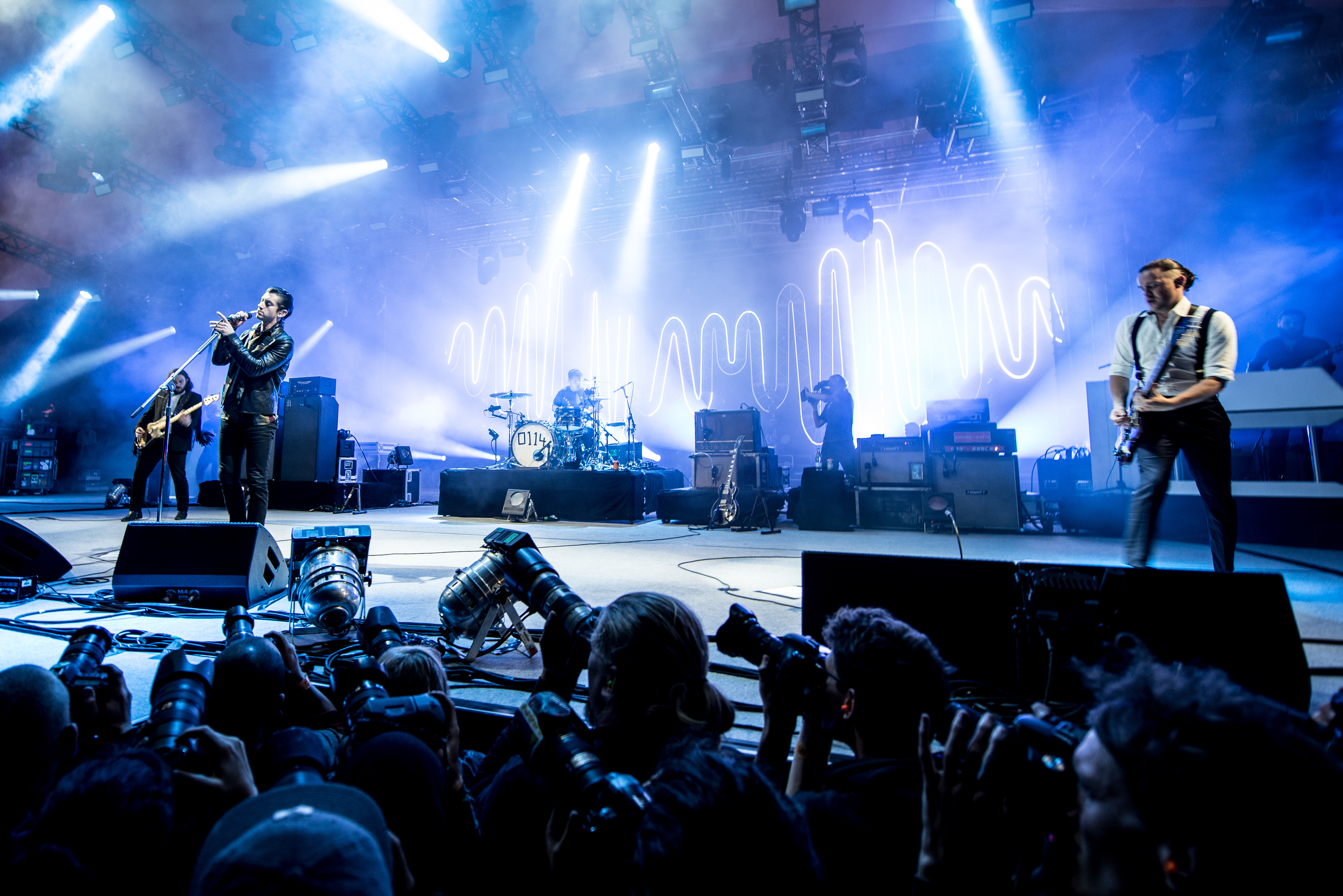
Arctic Monkeys Spent Nineteen weeks at number one this year with AM

== Chart history ==
List of Irish Independent Albums Chart number-one albums of 2022
Issue date	Album	Artist	Label	Ref
7 January	25	Adele	XL	
14 January	25	Adele	XL	
21 January	25	Adele	XL	
28 January	25	Adele	XL	
4 February	25	Adele	XL	
11 February	Charmed Life – The Best of the Divine Comedy	The Divine Comedy	The Divine Comedy	
18 February	The Dream	Alt-J	Infectious	
25 February	AM	Arctic Monkeys	Domino	
4 March	23	Central Cee	Central Cee	
11 March	If My Wife New I'd Be Dead	CMAT	CMATBaby/AWAL	
18 March	If My Wife New I'd Be Dead	CMAT	CMATBaby/AWAL	
25 March	All These Years	Tommy Flemming	Beaumex	
1 April	Never Let Me Go	Placebo	So Recordings	
8 April	AM	Arctic Monkeys	Domino	
15 April	Wet Leg	Wet Leg	Domino	
22 April	AM	Arctic Monkeys	Domino	
29 April	Skinty Fia	Fontaines D.C.	Partisan	
6 May	Courageous	Róisín O	3ú	
13 May	1970s	John Gallen	John Gallen	
20 May	Sometimes We See More In the Dark	The Blizzards	The Blizzards	
27 May	White Ladder	David Gray	IHT	
3 June	Heart Under	Just Mustard	Partisan	
10 June	AM	Arctic Monkeys	Domino	
17 June	The Bonny	Gerry Cinnamon	Little Runaway	
24 June	A Light for Attracting Attention	The Smile	XL	
1 July	Live At the Lobby	Mic Christopher	Born Optimistic	
8 July	Skinty Fia	Fontaines D.C.	Partisan	
15 July	Wasteland	Brent Faiyaz	Graduation/Lost Kids	
22 July	AM	Arctic Monkeys	Domino	
29 July	AM	Arctic Monkeys	Domino	
5 August	AM	Arctic Monkeys	Domino	
12 August	AM	Arctic Monkeys	Domino	
19 August	AM	Arctic Monkeys	Domino	
26 August	AM	Arctic Monkeys	Domino	
2 September	AM	Arctic Monkeys	Domino	
9 September	AM	Arctic Monkeys	Domino	
16 September	AM	Arctic Monkeys	Domino	
23 September	Hold the Girl	Rina Sawayama	Dirty Hit	
30 September	Smiling Like an Idiot	Sorcha Richardson	Faction	
7 October	AM	Arctic Monkeys	Domino	
14 October	Time Stopped	The Coronas	So Far So Good	
21 October	Being Funny in a Foreign Language	The 1975	Dirty Hit	
28 October	The Car	Arctic Monkeys	Domino	
4 November	The Car	Arctic Monkeys	Domino	
11 November	The Car	Arctic Monkeys	Domino	
18 November	Faith in the Future	Louis Tomlinson	BMG	
25 November	AM	Arctic Monkeys	Domino	
2 December	AM	Arctic Monkeys	Domino	
9 December	AM	Arctic Monkeys	Domino	
16 December	The Morning After	Nathan Carter	Sharpe Music	
23 December	AM	Arctic Monkeys	Domino	
30 December	AM	Arctic Monkeys	Domino	

== See also ==
- List of number-one albums of 2022 (Ireland)
- List of number-one singles of 2022 (Ireland)
