= List of Irish Independent Albums Chart number ones of 2013 =

This is a list of albums that reached number-one on the Irish Independent Albums Chart in 2013. The charts were compiled by GfK's Chart-Track on behalf of the Irish Recorded Music Association (IRMA).

== Chart history ==
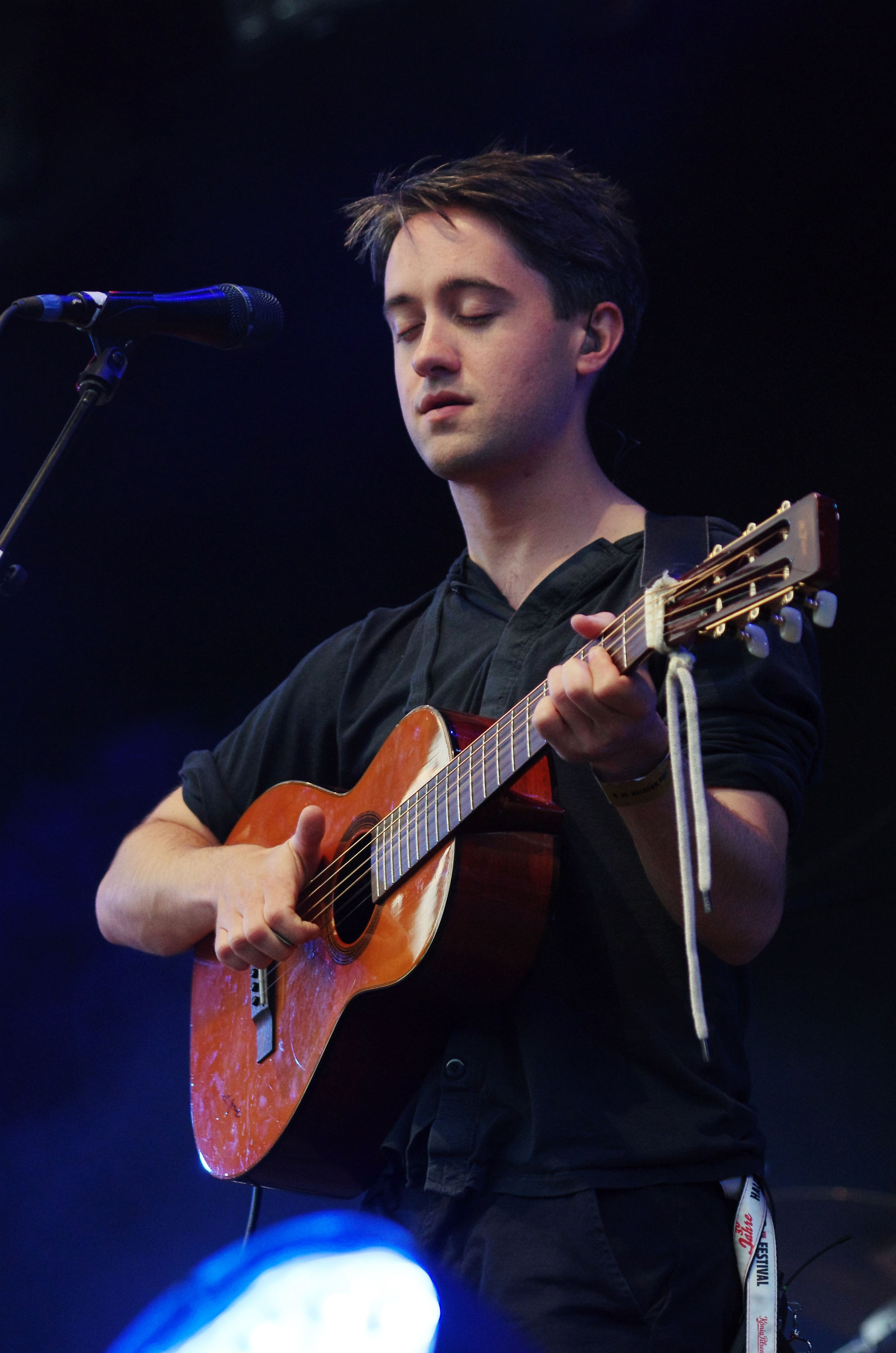
{Awayland} by Villagers (vocalist and guitarist Conor O'Brien pictured in 2013) remained at number 1 for five consecutive weeks upon its release in January 2013

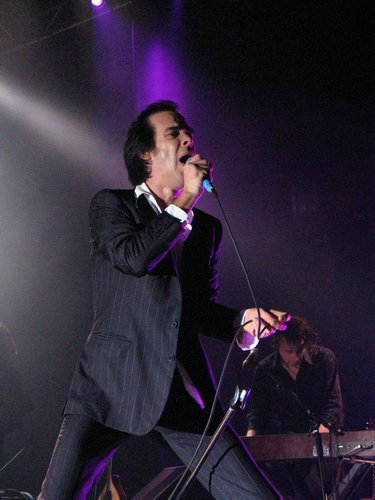
Nick Cave and the Bad Seeds' (vocalist Nick Cave pictured in 2004) Push the Sky Away debuted at number 1 upon its release in February 2013

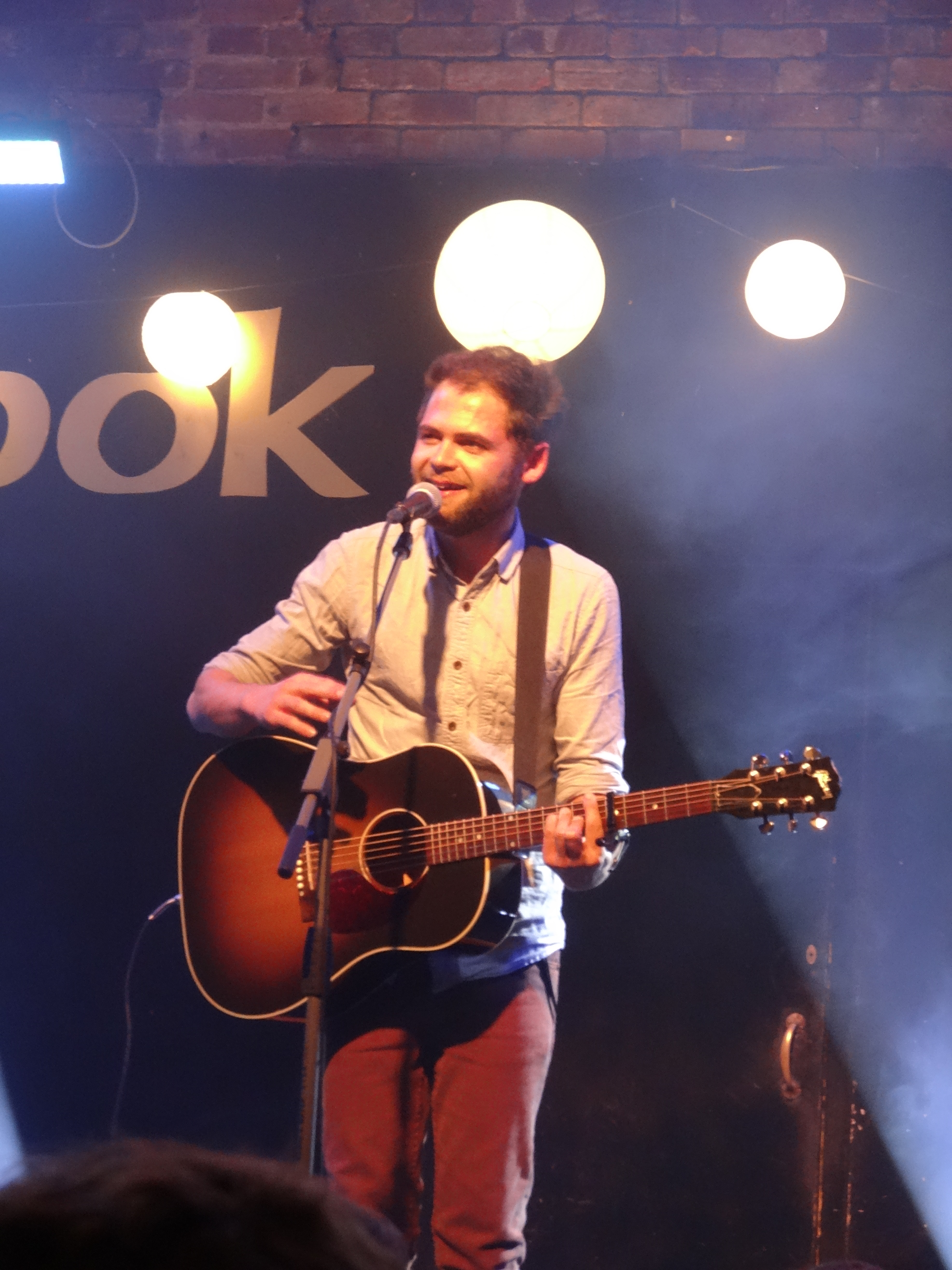
All the Little Lights by Passenger (pictured in 2013) held the number 1 position for 12 consecutive weeks

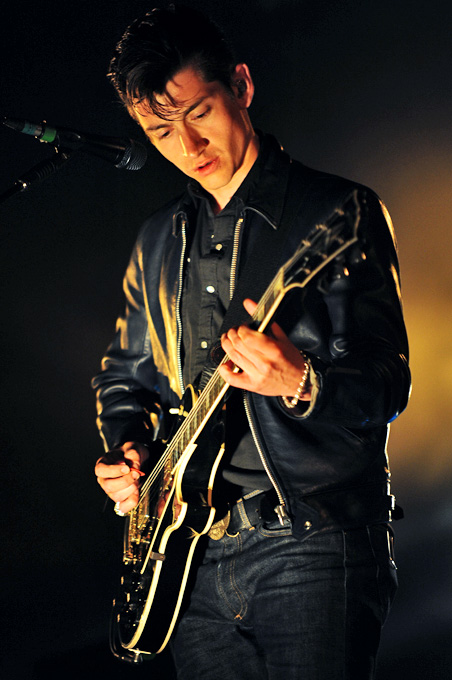
AM by Arctic Monkeys (vocalist and guitarist Alex Turner pictured in 2012) held the number 1 position for 12 consecutive weeks

List of Irish Independent Albums Chart number-one albums of 2013
| Issue date | Album | Artist | Label | Ref |
|---|---|---|---|---|
| 4 January | An Awesome Wave | ∆ | Infectious | |
| 11 January | An Awesome Wave | ∆ | Infectious | |
| 18 January | {Awayland} | Villagers | Domino | |
| 25 January | {Awayland} | Villagers | Domino | |
| 1 February | {Awayland} | Villagers | Domino | |
| 8 February | {Awayland} | Villagers | Domino | |
| 15 February | {Awayland} | Villagers | Domino | |
| 22 February | Push the Sky Away | Nick Cave and the Bad Seeds | Bad Seed Ltd | |
| 1 March | All the Little Lights | Passenger | Nettwerk | |
| 8 March | All the Little Lights | Passenger | Nettwerk | |
| 15 March | All the Little Lights | Passenger | Nettwerk | |
| 22 March | All the Little Lights | Passenger | Nettwerk | |
| 29 March | All the Little Lights | Passenger | Nettwerk | |
| 5 April | All the Little Lights | Passenger | Nettwerk | |
| 12 April | All the Little Lights | Passenger | Nettwerk | |
| 19 April | All the Little Lights | Passenger | Nettwerk | |
| 26 April | All the Little Lights | Passenger | Nettwerk | |
| 3 May | All the Little Lights | Passenger | Nettwerk | |
| 10 May | All the Little Lights | Passenger | Nettwerk | |
| 17 May | Modern Vampires of the City | Vampire Weekend | XL | |
| 24 May | Trouble Will Find Me | The National | 4AD | |
| 31 May | Trouble Will Find Me | The National | 4AD | |
| 7 June | ...Like Clockwork | Queens of the Stone Age | Matador | |
| 14 June | ...Like Clockwork | Queens of the Stone Age | Matador | |
| 21 June | ...Like Clockwork | Queens of the Stone Age | Matador | |
| 28 June | ...Like Clockwork | Queens of the Stone Age | Matador | |
| 5 July | Chop Chop | Bell X1 | BellyUp | |
| 12 July | Chop Chop | Bell X1 | BellyUp | |
| 19 July | Chop Chop | Bell X1 | BellyUp | |
| 26 July | The Heist | Macklemore and Ryan Lewis | Macklemore | |
| 2 August | All the Little Lights | Passenger | Nettwerk | |
| 9 August | Where I Wanna Be | Nathan Carter | Sharpe Music | |
| 16 August | Where I Wanna Be | Nathan Carter | Sharpe Music | |
| 23 August | Where I Wanna Be | Nathan Carter | Sharpe Music | |
| 30 August | Where I Wanna Be | Nathan Carter | Sharpe Music | |
| 6 September | Where I Wanna Be | Nathan Carter | Sharpe Music | |
| 13 September | AM | Arctic Monkeys | Domino | |
| 20 September | AM | Arctic Monkeys | Domino | |
| 27 September | AM | Arctic Monkeys | Domino | |
| 4 October | AM | Arctic Monkeys | Domino | |
| 11 October | AM | Arctic Monkeys | Domino | |
| 18 October | AM | Arctic Monkeys | Domino | |
| 25 October | AM | Arctic Monkeys | Domino | |
| 1 November | AM | Arctic Monkeys | Domino | |
| 8 November | AM | Arctic Monkeys | Domino | |
| 15 November | AM | Arctic Monkeys | Domino | |
| 22 November | AM | Arctic Monkeys | Domino | |
| 29 November | AM | Arctic Monkeys | Domino | |
| 6 December | The Last Great Love Song | Finbar Furey | Banshee | |
| 13 December | The Last Great Love Song | Finbar Furey | Banshee | |
| 20 December | The Last Great Love Song | Finbar Furey | Banshee | |
| 27 December | The Last Great Love Song | Finbar Furey | Banshee | |

== See also ==
- List of number-one albums of 2013 (Ireland)
- List of number-one singles of 2013 (Ireland)
