= List of Irish Independent Albums Chart number ones of 2018 =

This is a list of albums that reached number-one on the Irish Independent Albums Chart in 2018. The charts were compiled by Irish Recorded Music Association (IRMA).

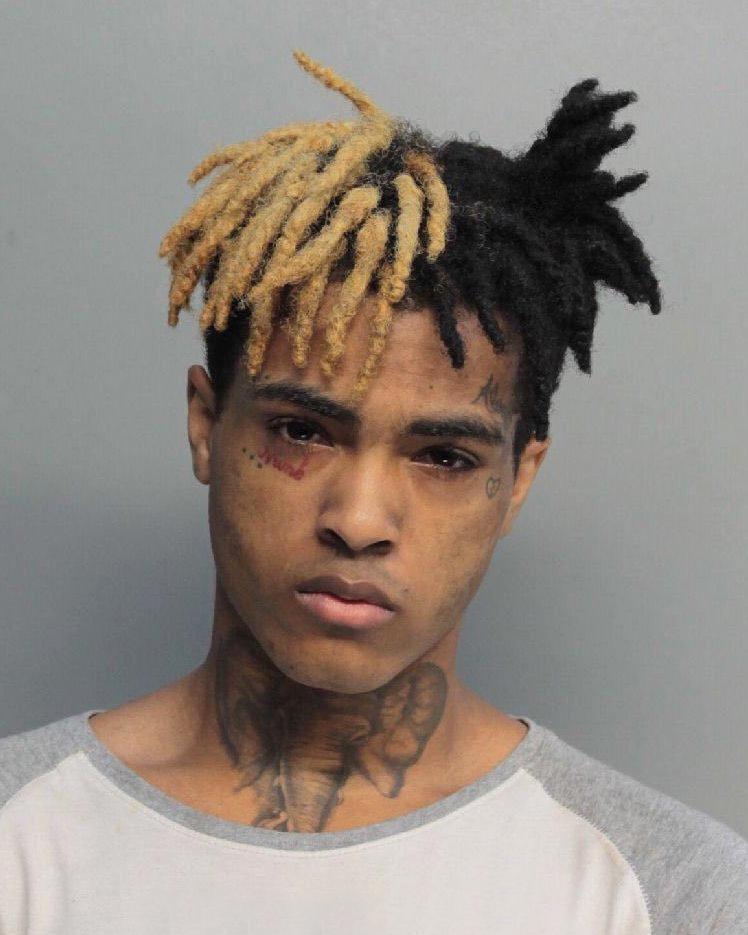
Xxxtentacion reached number one 17 non-consecutive weeks in 2018

== Chart history ==
List of Irish Independent Albums Chart number-one albums of 2018
Issue date	Album	Artist	Label	Ref
5 January	Who Built the Moon?	Noel Gallagher's High Flying Birds	Sour Mash	
12 January	Make Me An Island - The Best of	Joe Dolan	Castle Pulse	
19 January	Tales from the Backseat	The Academic	Room 6	
26 January	Tales from the Backseat	The Academic	Room 6	
2 February	Tales from the Backseat	The Academic	Room 6	
9 February	Tales from the Backseat	The Academic	Room 6	
16 February	Tales from the Backseat	The Academic	Room 6	
23 February	Dear Annie	Rejje Snow	BMG	
2 March	Wyvern Lingo	Wyvern Lingo	Rubyworks	
9 March	Live at the NCH	The Gloaming	Real World	
16 March	Live at the NCH	The Gloaming	Real World	
23 March	Twice Around The World	The Stunning	Dirtbird	
30 March	Feel It Again	Hudson Taylor	Rubyworks	
6 April	True North	Keywest	Sonic Realm	
13 April	Golden	Kylie Minogue	BMG	
20 April	?	XXXTentacion	Bad Vibes Forever	
27 April	The Ultimate Collection Vol.1	Big Tom	K-Mac	
5 May	True Surrender	Delorecords	Delorecords	
12 May	Singularity	Jon Hopkins	Domino	
19 May	Tranquility Base Hotel & Casino	Arctic Monkeys	Domino	
26 May	Tranquility Base Hotel & Casino	Arctic Monkeys	Domino	
1 June	Tranquility Base Hotel & Casino	Arctic Monkeys	Domino	
8 June	God's Favorite Customer	Father John Misty	Bella Union	
15 June	Lost & Found	Jorja Smith	Famm	
22 June	?	XXXTentacion	Bad Vibes Forever	
29 June	?	XXXTentacion	Bad Vibes Forever	
6 July	?	XXXTentacion	Bad Vibes Forever	
13 July	?	XXXTentacion	Bad Vibes Forever	
20 July	?	XXXTentacion	Bad Vibes Forever	
27 July	?	XXXTentacion	Bad Vibes Forever	
3 August	?	XXXTentacion	Bad Vibes Forever	
10 August	?	XXXTentacion	Bad Vibes Forever	
17 August	?	XXXTentacion	Bad Vibes Forever	
24 August	?	XXXTentacion	Bad Vibes Forever	
31 August	Marauder	Interpol	Matador	
7 September	Runaway	Passenger	Black Crow	
14 September	?	XXXTentacion	Bad Vibes Forever	
21 September	?	XXXTentacion	Bad Vibes Forever	
28 September	The Art of Pretending to Swim	Villagers	Domino	
5 October	?	XXXTentacion	Bad Vibes Forever	
12 October	?	XXXTentacion	Bad Vibes Forever	
19 October	Born for the Road	Nathan Carter	Sharpe Music	
26 October	Natural Rebel	Richard Ashcroft	BMG	
2 November	Dreamer	Sean and Conor Price	Sean and Conor Price	
9 November	Lighthouse Keeper	Don Mescall	AGR Television Records	
16 November	17	XXXTentacion	Bad Vibes Forever	
23 November	Merrie Land	The Good, the Bad & the Queen	Studio 13	
30 November	Dummy Boy	6ix9ine	Ten Thousand Projects	
7 December	Dummy Boy	6ix9ine	Ten Thousand Projects	
14 December	Skins	XXXTentacion	Bad Vibes Forever	
21 December	Voice of Hope II	Tommy Fleming	TF Productions	
28 December	Voice of Hope II	Tommy Fleming	TF Productions	

== See also ==
- List of number-one albums of 2018 (Ireland)
- List of number-one singles of 2018 (Ireland)
