= List of Irish Independent Albums Chart number ones of 2011 =

This is a list of albums that reached number-one on the Irish Independent Albums Chart in 2011. The charts were compiled by GfK's Chart-Track on behalf of the Irish Recorded Music Association (IRMA).

== Chart history ==
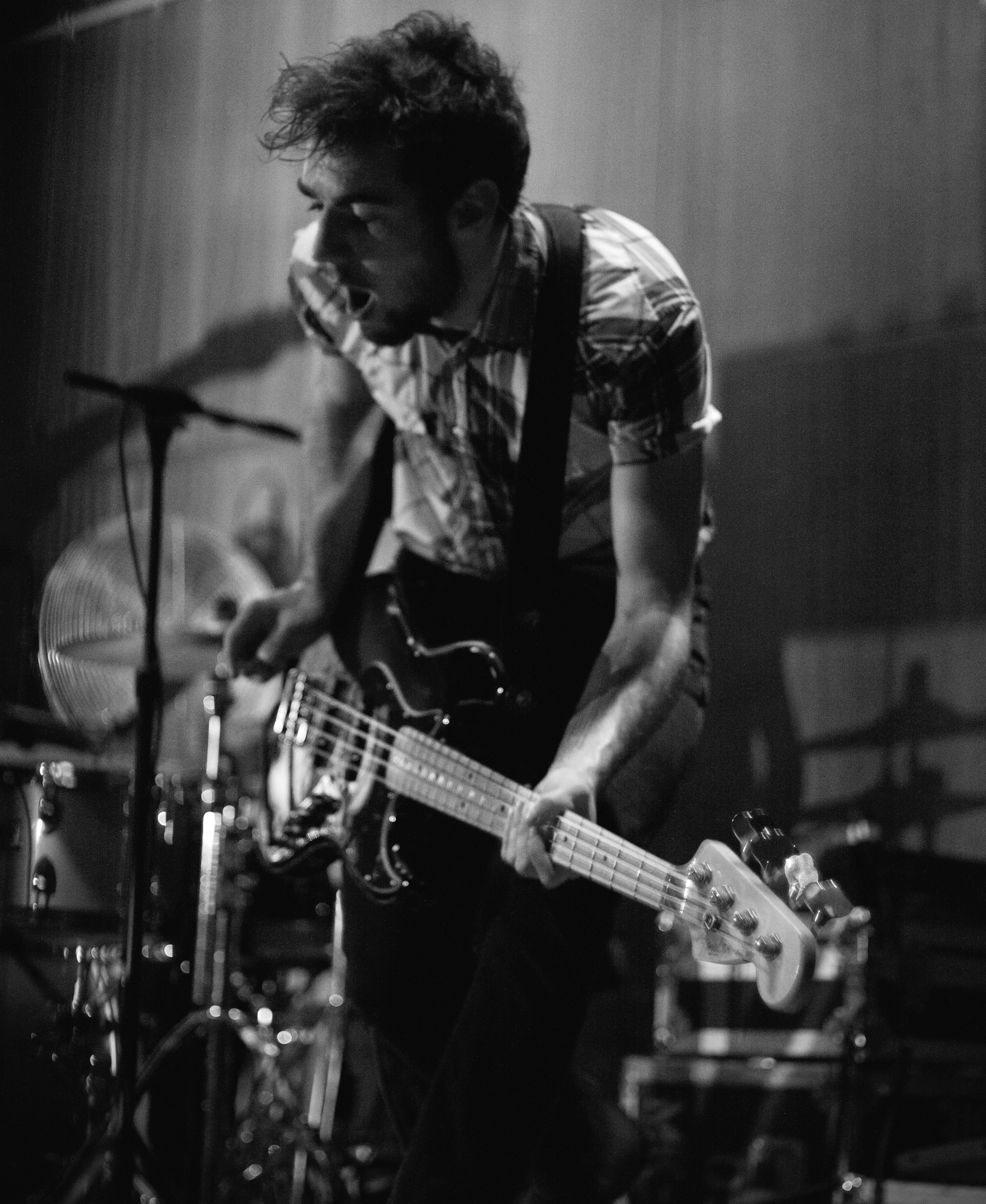
Tourist History, the debut album by Two Door Cinema Club (guitarist Kevin Baird pictured), reached number 1 in the first published chart of 2011

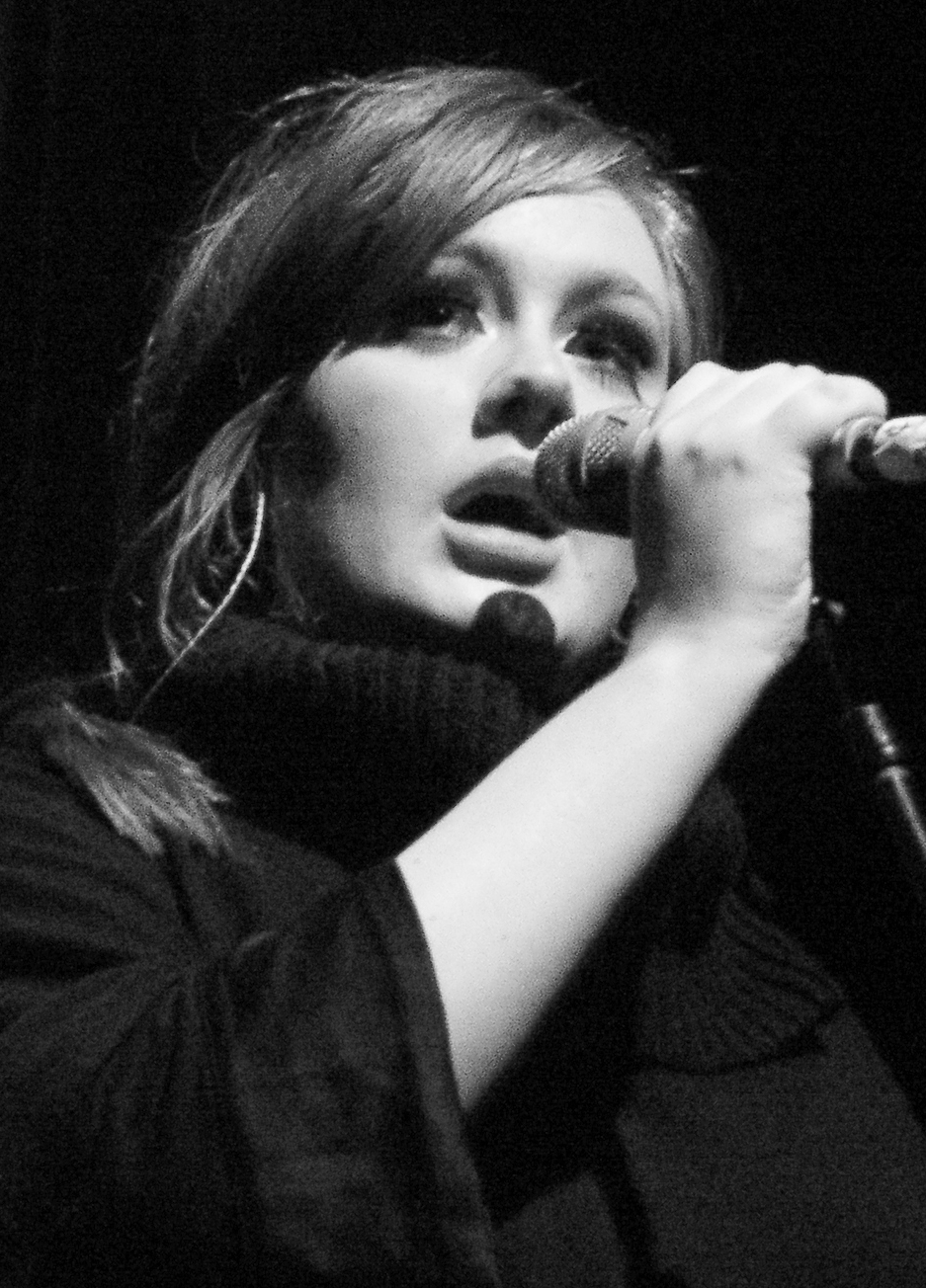
Two of Adele's albums—19 and 21—reached number 1 in 2011. 21 held the position for 37 consecutive weeks

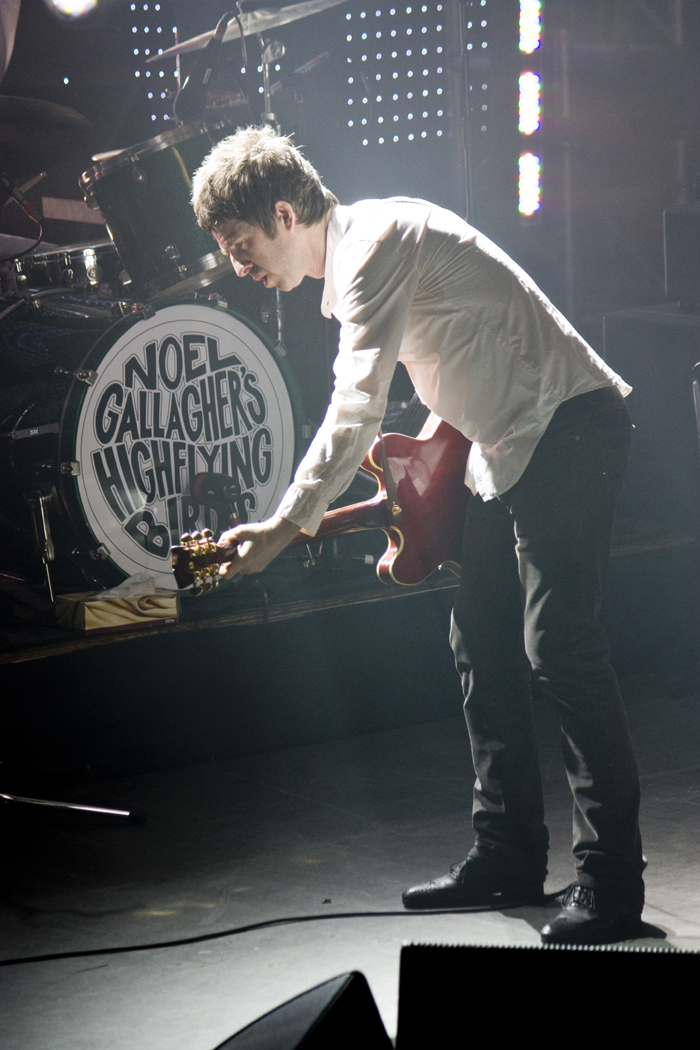
Noel Gallagher's High Flying Birds' eponymous debut album entered the chart at number 1 in October 2011 and held the peak position for two consecutive weeks

List of Irish Independent Albums Chart number-one albums of 2011
Issue date	Album	Artist	Label	Ref
7 January	Tourist History	Two Door Cinema Club	Kitsuné	
14 January	19	Adele	XL	
21 January	19	Adele	XL	
28 January	21	Adele	XL	
4 February	21	Adele	XL	
11 February	21	Adele	XL	
18 February	21	Adele	XL	
25 February	21	Adele	XL	
4 March	21	Adele	XL	
11 March	21	Adele	XL	
18 March	21	Adele	XL	
25 March	21	Adele	XL	
1 April	21	Adele	XL	
8 April	21	Adele	XL	
15 April	21	Adele	XL	
22 April	21	Adele	XL	
29 April	21	Adele	XL	
6 May	21	Adele	XL	
13 May	21	Adele	XL	
20 May	21	Adele	XL	
27 May	21	Adele	XL	
3 June	21	Adele	XL	
10 June	21	Adele	XL	
17 June	21	Adele	XL	
24 June	21	Adele	XL	
1 July	21	Adele	XL	
8 July	21	Adele	XL	
15 July	21	Adele	XL	
22 July	21	Adele	XL	
29 July	21	Adele	XL	
5 August	21	Adele	XL	
12 August	21	Adele	XL	
19 August	21	Adele	XL	
26 August	21	Adele	XL	
2 September	21	Adele	XL	
9 September	21	Adele	XL	
16 September	21	Adele	XL	
23 September	21	Adele	XL	
30 September	21	Adele	XL	
7 October	21	Adele	XL	
14 October	Passenger	Lisa Hannigan	Hoop	
21 October	Noel Gallagher's High Flying Birds	Noel Gallagher's High Flying Birds	Sour Mash	
28 October	Noel Gallagher's High Flying Birds	Noel Gallagher's High Flying Birds	Sour Mash	
4 November	21	Adele	XL	
11 November	21	Adele	XL	
18 November	Closer to You	The Coronas	3ú	
25 November	21	Adele	XL	
2 December	21	Adele	XL	
9 December	21	Adele	XL	
16 December	21	Adele	XL	
23 December	21	Adele	XL	
30 December	21	Adele	XL	

== See also ==
- List of number-one albums of 2011 (Ireland)
- List of number-one singles of 2011 (Ireland)
