= List of Irish Independent Albums Chart number ones of 2012 =

This is a list of albums that reached number-one on the Irish Independent Albums Chart in 2012. The charts were compiled by GfK's Chart-Track on behalf of the Irish Recorded Music Association (IRMA).

== Chart history ==
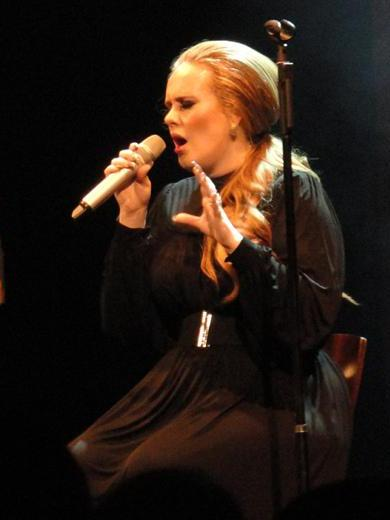
Adele's second album, 21, reached number one 33 non-consecutive weeks in 2012

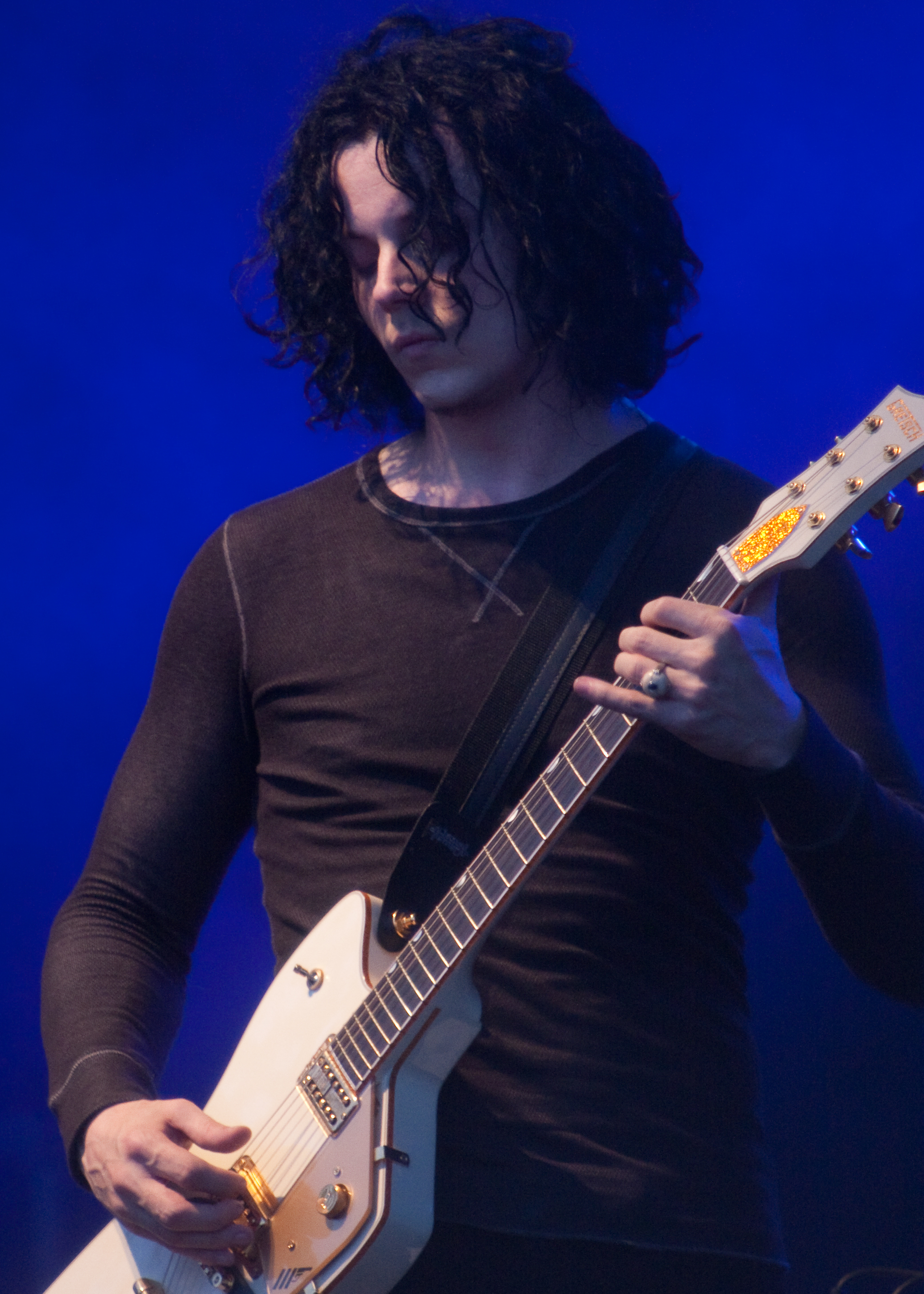
Blunderbuss, the debut album by American musician Jack White, reached number 1 in April 2012, knocking Adele's 21 off of the peak position

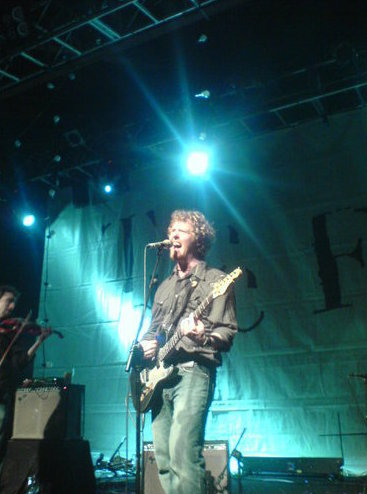
Glen Hansard entered the chart at number one in June 2012 with his debut album Rhythm and Repose, which held the peak position for two consecutive weeks

List of Irish Independent Albums Chart number-one albums of 2012
Issue date	Album	Artist	Label	Ref
6 January	21	Adele	XL	
13 January	21	Adele	XL	
20 January	21	Adele	XL	
27 January	21	Adele	XL	
3 February	21	Adele	XL	
10 February	21	Adele	XL	
17 February	21	Adele	XL	
24 February	21	Adele	XL	
2 March	21	Adele	XL	
9 March	21	Adele	XL	
16 March	21	Adele	XL	
23 March	21	Adele	XL	
30 March	This Life	The Original Rudeboys	Gotta Run	
6 April	21	Adele	XL	
13 April	21	Adele	XL	
20 April	21	Adele	XL	
27 April	Blunderbuss	Jack White	XL	
4 May	Blunderbuss	Jack White	XL	
11 May	21	Adele	XL	
18 May	21	Adele	XL	
25 May	21	Adele	XL	
1 June	21	Adele	XL	
8 June	21	Adele	XL	
15 June	Voice	Brian Kennedy	Collective MGMT	
22 June	Rhythm and Repose	Glen Hansard	Plateau	
29 June	Rhythm and Repose	Glen Hansard	Plateau	
6 July	21	Adele	XL	
13 July	21	Adele	XL	
20 July	21	Adele	XL	
27 July	21	Adele	XL	
3 August	21	Adele	XL	
10 August	21	Adele	XL	
17 August	21	Adele	XL	
24 August	21	Adele	XL	
31 August	21	Adele	XL	
7 September	Beacon	Two Door Cinema Club	Kitsuné	
14 September	Coexist	The xx	Young Turks	
21 September	Coexist	The xx	Young Turks	
28 September	Coexist	The xx	Young Turks	
5 October	Coexist	The xx	Young Turks	
12 October	21	Adele	XL	
19 October	21	Adele	XL	
26 October	The 27 Club	Jack Lukeman	Library Notes	
2 November	The Fire	Matt Cardle	So What?	
9 November	An Awesome Wave	∆	Infectious	
16 November	21	Adele	XL	
23 November	Clocks	Julie Feeney	Mittens	
30 November	Begin	Tommy Fleming	TF	
7 December	This Life	The Original Rudeboys	Gotta Run	
14 December	Begin	Tommy Fleming	TF	
21 December	Begin	Tommy Fleming	TF	
28 December	21	Adele	XL	

== See also ==
- List of number-one albums of 2012 (Ireland)
- List of number-one singles of 2012 (Ireland)
