= List of Irish Independent Albums Chart number ones of 2019 =

This is a list of albums that reached number-one on the Irish Independent Albums Chart in 2019. The charts were compiled by Irish Recorded Music Association (IRMA).

== Chart history ==
List of Irish Independent Albums Chart number-one albums of 2019
Issue date	Album	Artist	Label	Ref
4 January	Dummy Boy	6ix9ine	Ten Thousand Projects	
11 January	Dummy Boy	6ix9ine	Ten Thousand Projects	
18 January	Dummy Boy	6ix9ine	Ten Thousand Projects	
25 January	Voice of Hope II	Tommy Fleming	TF Productions	
1 February	Voice of Hope II	Tommy Fleming	TF Productions	
8 February	Thistle and Thorn	John Blek	K&F	
15 February	AJ Tracey	AJ Tracey	AJ Tracey	
22 February	Voice of Hope II	Tommy Fleming	TF Productions	
1 March	3	The Gloaming	Real World	
8 March	Voice of Hope II	Tommy Fleming	TF Productions	
15 March	The Gloaming 3	The Gloaming	Real World	
22 March	Both Sides Now	The Kilfenora Céilí Band	The Kilfenora Céilí Band	
29 March	When I Wake Up	Maverick Sabre	FAMM	
5 April	17	XXXTentacion	Bad Vibes Forever	
12 April	17	XXXTentacion	Bad Vibes Forever	
19 April	Dogrel	Fontaines D.C.	Partisan	
26 April	Map of the Soul: Persona	BTS	Bighit	
3 May	In the End	The Cranberries	BMG	
10 May	In the End	The Cranberries	BMG	
17 May	In the End	The Cranberries	BMG	
24 May	I Am Easy to Find	The National	4AD	
31 May	I Am Easy to Find	The National	4AD	
7 June	Ignorance Is Bliss	Skepta	Boy Better Know	
14 June	Office Politics	Divine Comedy	Divine Comedy	
21 June	I Am Easy to Find	The National	4AD	
28 June	Erratic Cinematic	Gerry Cinnamon	Little Runaway	
5 July	Gang Signs & Prayer	Stormzy	Merky	
12 July	Gang Signs & Prayer	Stormzy	Merky	
19 July	Gang Signs & Prayer	Stormzy	Merky	
26 July	Freya Ridings	Freya Ridings	Good Soldier	
2 August	The Big Day	Chance the Rapper	Chance the Rapper	
9 August	Erratic Cinematic	Gerry Cinnamon	Little Runaway	
16 August	I, I	Bon Iver	Jagjaguwar	
23 August	When I Have Fears	The Murder Capital	Human Season	
30 August	Erratic Cinematic	Gerry Cinnamon	Little Runaway	
6 September	Erratic Cinematic	Gerry Cinnamon	Little Runaway	
13 September	Erratic Cinematic	Gerry Cinnamon	Little Runaway	
20 September	Beneath the Eyrie	The Pixies	Infectious	
27 September	Erratic Cinematic	Gerry Cinnamon	Little Runaway	
4 October	The Talkies	Girl Band	Rough Trade	
11 October	White, Pink + Blue	Brave Giant	Collective MGMT	
18 October	Ordinary Superhero	Keywest	Marshall	
25 October	Erratic Cinematic	Gerry Cinnamon	Little Runaway	
1 November	The Livelong Day	Lankum	Rough Trade	
8 November	Erratic Cinematic	Gerry Cinnamon	Little Runaway	
15 November	Ghosteen	Nick Cave and the Bad Seeds	Ghosteen	
22 November	Irish Heartland	Nathan Carter	Sharpe	
29 November	Airs and Graces	Brendan Grace	Beaumex	
6 December	Airs and Graces	Brendan Grace	Beaumex	
13 December	Airs and Graces	Brendan Grace	Beaumex	
20 December	Airs and Graces	Brendan Grace	Beaumex	
27 December	Airs and Graces	Brendan Grace	Beaumex	

== See also ==
- List of number-one albums of 2019 (Ireland)
- List of number-one singles of 2019 (Ireland)
