= List of number-one albums of 2015 (Ireland) =

The Irish Albums Chart ranks the best-performing albums in Ireland, as compiled by Chart-Track on behalf of the Irish Recorded Music Association.

Issue date	Album	Artist	Reference
1 January	x	Ed Sheeran	
8 January	x	Ed Sheeran	
15 January	x	Ed Sheeran	
22 January	Hozier	Hozier	
29 January	x	Ed Sheeran	
5 February	Shadows in the Night	Bob Dylan	
12 February	Coming Up for Air	Kodaline	
19 February	In the Lonely Hour	Sam Smith	
26 February	x	Ed Sheeran	
5 March	Chasing Yesterday	Noel Gallagher's High Flying Birds	
12 March	x	Ed Sheeran	
19 March	Hozier	Hozier	
26 March	Chaos and the Calm	James Bay	
2 April	Chaos and the Calm	James Bay	
9 April	Hozier	Hozier	
16 April	Darling Arithmetic	Villagers	
23 April	Stories from the Surface	Ham Sandwich	
30 April	The Magic Whip	Blur	
7 May	Wilder Mind	Mumford & Sons	
14 May	Beautiful Life	Nathan Carter	
21 May	Beautiful Life	Nathan Carter	
28 May	Beautiful Life	Nathan Carter	
4 June	How Big, How Blue, How Beautiful	Florence and the Machine	
11 June	Drones	Muse	
18 June	How Big, How Blue, How Beautiful	Florence and the Machine	
25 June	How Big, How Blue, How Beautiful	Florence and the Machine	
2 July	1989	Taylor Swift	
9 July	1989	Taylor Swift	
16 July	Communion	Years & Years	
23 July	x	Ed Sheeran	
30 July	x	Ed Sheeran	
6 August	x	Ed Sheeran	
13 August	Compton	Dr. Dre	
20 August	x	Ed Sheeran	
27 August	Little Victories	The Strypes	
3 September	Here and Now	Ryan Sheridan	
10 September	One Good Night	Derek Ryan	
17 September	x	Ed Sheeran	
24 September	Honeymoon	Lana Del Rey	
1 October	Right Here	Shane Filan	
8 October	Joyland	Keywest	
15 October	Joyland	Keywest	
22 October	x	Ed Sheeran	
29 October	Sounds Good Feels Good	5 Seconds of Summer	
5 November	x	Ed Sheeran	
12 November	Get Weird	Little Mix	
19 November	Made in the A.M.	One Direction	
26 November	25	Adele	
3 December	25	Adele	
10 December	25	Adele	
17 December	25	Adele	
24 December	25	Adele	
31 December	25	Adele	

== See also ==
- List of number-one singles of 2015 (Ireland)
