= Dutch Charts =

Music charts in the Netherlands

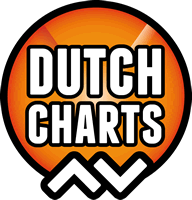
Logo since 2015

Dutch Charts, GfK Dutch Charts, MegaCharts is a chart company responsible for producing a number of official charts in the Netherlands, of which the Single Top 100 and the Album Top 100 are the most known ones. It is owned by German market research company GfK, a subsidiary of NIQ.

== The Mega Charts ==
=== Singles and Tracks ===
- Single Top 100
- Single Tip – a list of 30 singles which are considered as having some chance of reaching the Single Top 100 chart

=== Albums ===
- Album Top 100
- Compilation Top 30
- Combi Album Top 100
- Backcatalogue Top 50
- Vinyl

=== DVDs and others ===
- Dance Top 30
- Backcatalogue Top 50
- DVD Music Top 30
- Film DVD Top 30
- Game Top 10
