= The Collection (Tommy Fleming album) =

Compilation album by Tommy Fleming
- Released: January 2003
- Recorded: 1996–2003
- Genre: Vocal
- Label: Dara Records

Tommy Fleming chronology
The Contender (2000)	The Collection (2003)	Voice Of Hope (2005)

The Collection is a compilation album released in 2003 by Irish singer Tommy Fleming. This two disc collection features some of his favourite and most popular songs of the first ten years in his career. Disc two is a limited edition live CD.

== Track listing ==
=== Disc 1 ===
1. Sand & Water – 4:19
2. The Contender – 4:10
3. Silence Is King – 4:02
4. Fare Thee Well Love – 4:16
5. The Best Is Yet To Come – 2:12
6. The Leaving Of Liverpool – 4:00
7. The Isle of Inisfree – 4:36
8. Wait Till The Clouds Roll By – 4:48
9. The Rose & The Briar – 3:27
10. Ar Eirinn Ni Neosfainn Ce Hi – 4:20
11. As I Leave Behind Neidin – 2:52
12. The Auld Triangle – 4:36
13. The Mountains Of Pomeroy – 5:31
14. In The Gloaming – 3:02
15. Raglan Road – 4:22
16. Hard Times – 4:01

=== Disc 2 ===
1. Through A Child's Eyes – 5:05
2. The Bantry Girl's Lament – 4:13
3. Danny Boy – 6:26
4. Tom Traubert's Blues (Waltzing Matilda) – 4:23
5. Follow On – 3:56
6. Only Our Rivers Run Free – 6:11
7. Green Grow The Rushes – 4:02
8. The Water Is Wide – 4:34
9. Love Is All Around – 4:29
10. Galway Bay – 4:02
