= List of Irish Independent Albums Chart number ones of 2023 =

This is a list of albums that reached number-one on the Irish Independent Albums Chart in 2023. The charts were compiled by Irish Recorded Music Association (IRMA).

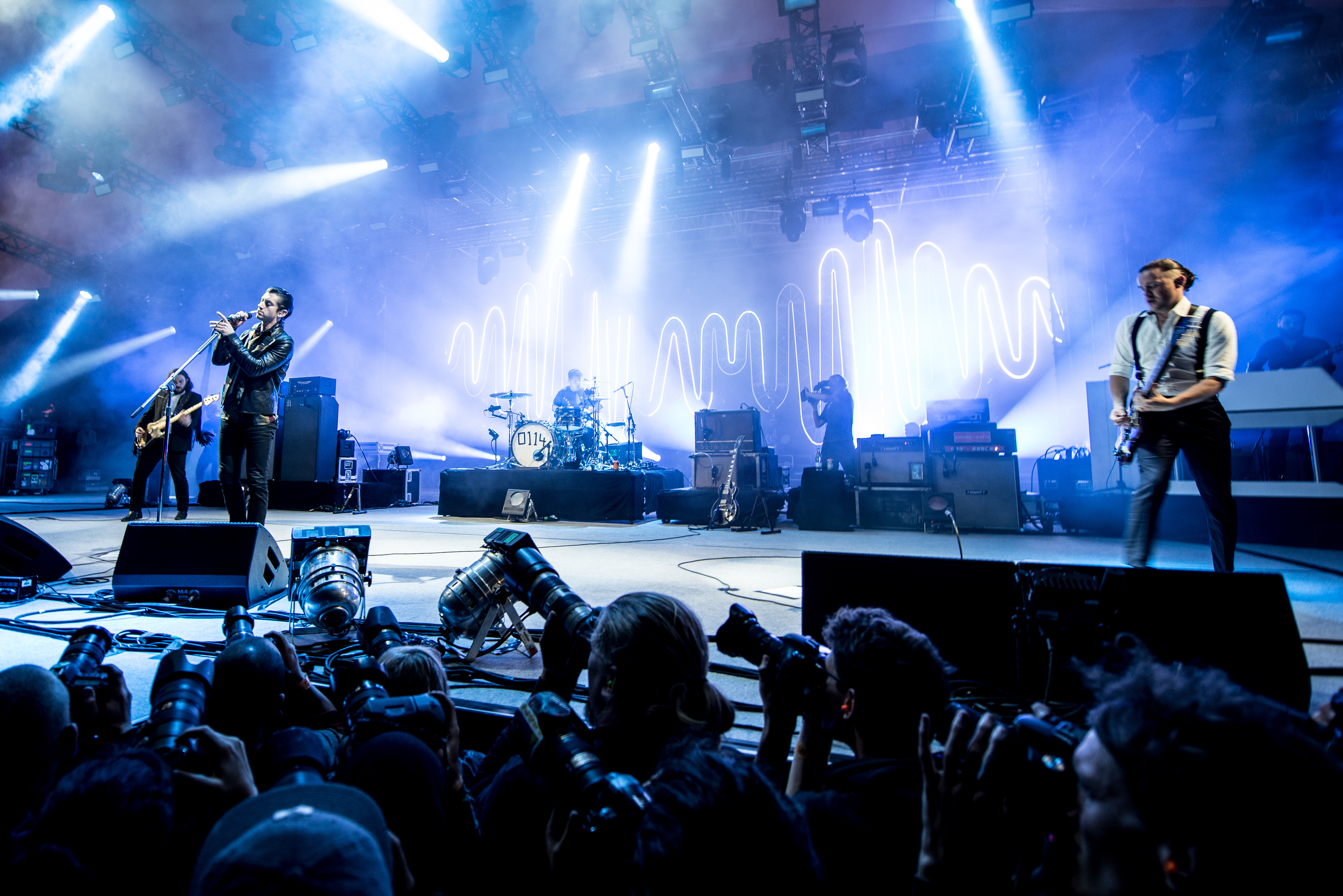
Arctic Monkeys Spent Twenty Seven weeks at number one this year with AM

== Chart history ==
List of Irish Independent Albums Chart number-one albums of 2023
Issue date	Album	Artist	Label	Ref
6 January	AM	Arctic Monkeys	Domino	
13 January	AM	Arctic Monkeys	Domino	
20 January	AM	Arctic Monkeys	Domino	
27 January	Gigi's Recovery	The Murder Capital	Human Season	
3 February	AM	Arctic Monkeys	Domino	
10 February	My 21st Century Blues	Raye	Human Re Sources	
17 February	All of This Is Chance	Lisa O'Neill	Rough Trade	
24 February	AM	Arctic Monkeys	Domino	
3 March	AM	Arctic Monkeys	Domino	
10 March	AM	Arctic Monkeys	Domino	
17 March	AM	Arctic Monkeys	Domino	
24 March	AM	Arctic Monkeys	Domino	
31 March	False Lankum	Lankum	Rough Trade	
7 April	False Lankum	Lankum	Rough Trade	
14 April	AM	Arctic Monkeys	Domino	
21 April	AM	Arctic Monkeys	Domino	
28 April	AM	Arctic Monkeys	Domino	
5 May	First Two Pages of Frankenstein	The National	4AD	
12 May	AM	Arctic Monkeys	Domino	
19 May	Wake Up & It's Over	Lovejoy	Anvil Cat	
26 May	AM	Arctic Monkeys	Domino	
2 June	AM	Arctic Monkeys	Domino	
9 June	Council Skies	Noel Gallagher's High Flying Birds	Sour Mash	
16 June	AM	Arctic Monkeys	Domino	
23 June	In Times New Roman...	Queens of the Stone Age	Matador	
30 June	The Road Not Taken	The High Kings	The High Kings	
7 July	Chaos for the Fly	Grian Chatten	Partisan	
14 July	I Inside the Old Year Dying	PJ Harvey	Partisan	
21 July	AM	Arctic Monkeys	Domino	
28 July	AM	Arctic Monkeys	Domino	
4 August	So Far... The Best Of	Sinéad O'Connor	Chrysalis	
11 August	So Far... The Best Of	Sinéad O'Connor	Chrysalis	
18 August	AM	Arctic Monkeys	Domino	
25 August	AM	Arctic Monkeys	Domino	
1 September	The Journey So Far - Live	Tumbling Paddies	Sharpe Music	
8 September	The Journey So Far - Live	Tumbling Paddies	Sharpe Music	
15 September	Hit Parade	Róisín Murphy	Ninja Tune	
22 September	Goodtime Charlie	Mick Flannery	Rosa	
29 September	Tension	Kylie Minogue	BMG	
6 October	Autumn Variations	Ed Sheeran	Gingerbread Man	
13 October	Crop Circle 3	Nines	Zino	
20 October	Crazymad, for Me	CMAT	CMATBaby/AWAL	
27 October	AM	Arctic Monkeys	Domino	
3 November	Phantom of the Afters	Kojaque	Soft Boy	
10 November	AM	Arctic Monkeys	Domino	
17 November	AM	Arctic Monkeys	Domino	
24 November	AM	Arctic Monkeys	Domino	
1 December	AM	Arctic Monkeys	Domino	
8 December	AM	Arctic Monkeys	Domino	
15 December	Music Man	Nathan Carter	Sharpe Music	
22 December	Music Man	Nathan Carter	Sharpe Music	
29 December	AM	Arctic Monkeys	Domino	

== See also ==
- List of number-one albums of 2023 (Ireland)
- List of number-one singles of 2023 (Ireland)
