= List of number-one singles of 2015 (Ireland) =

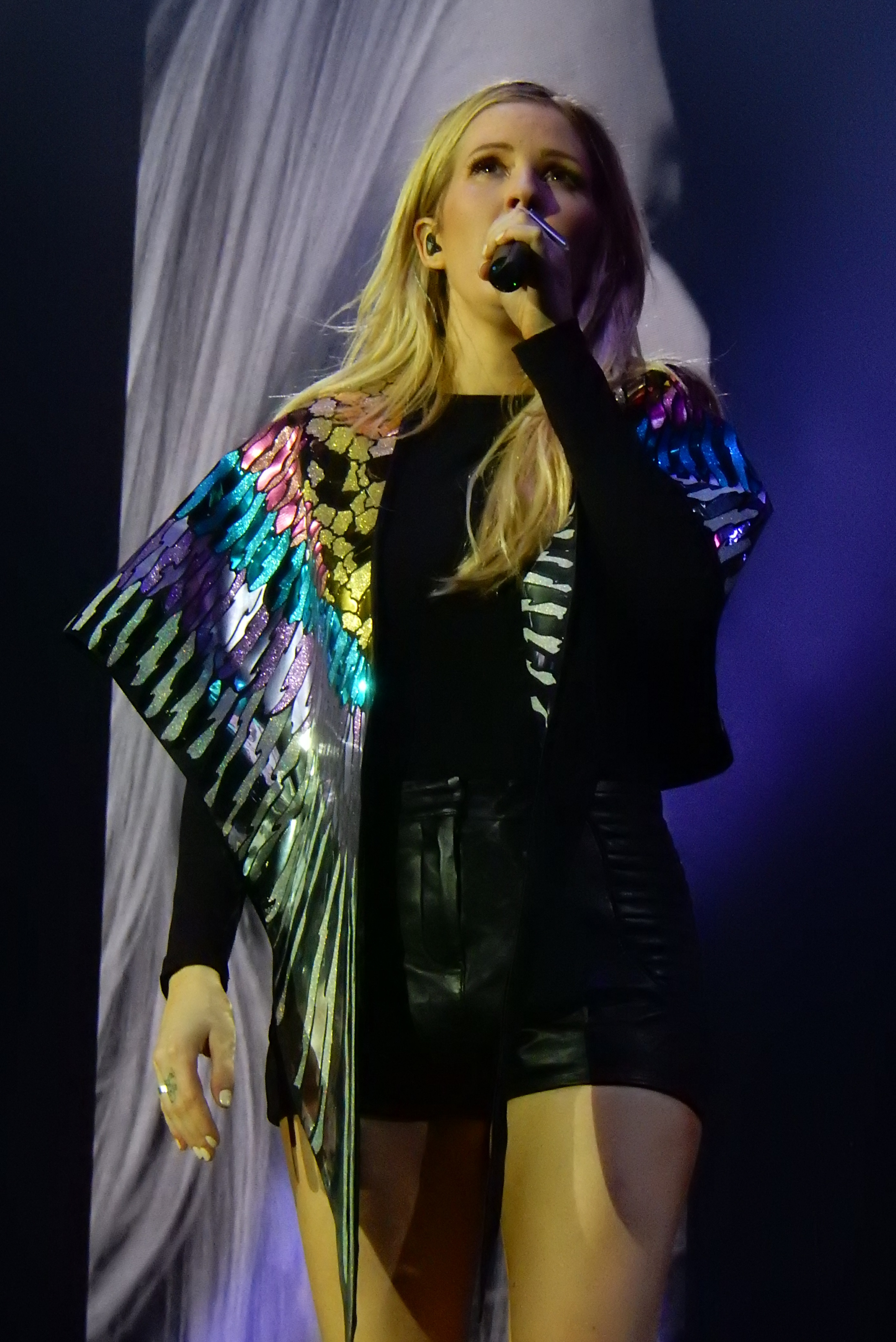
Ellie Goulding spent six consecutive weeks at number one with her first number one Love Me like You Do.

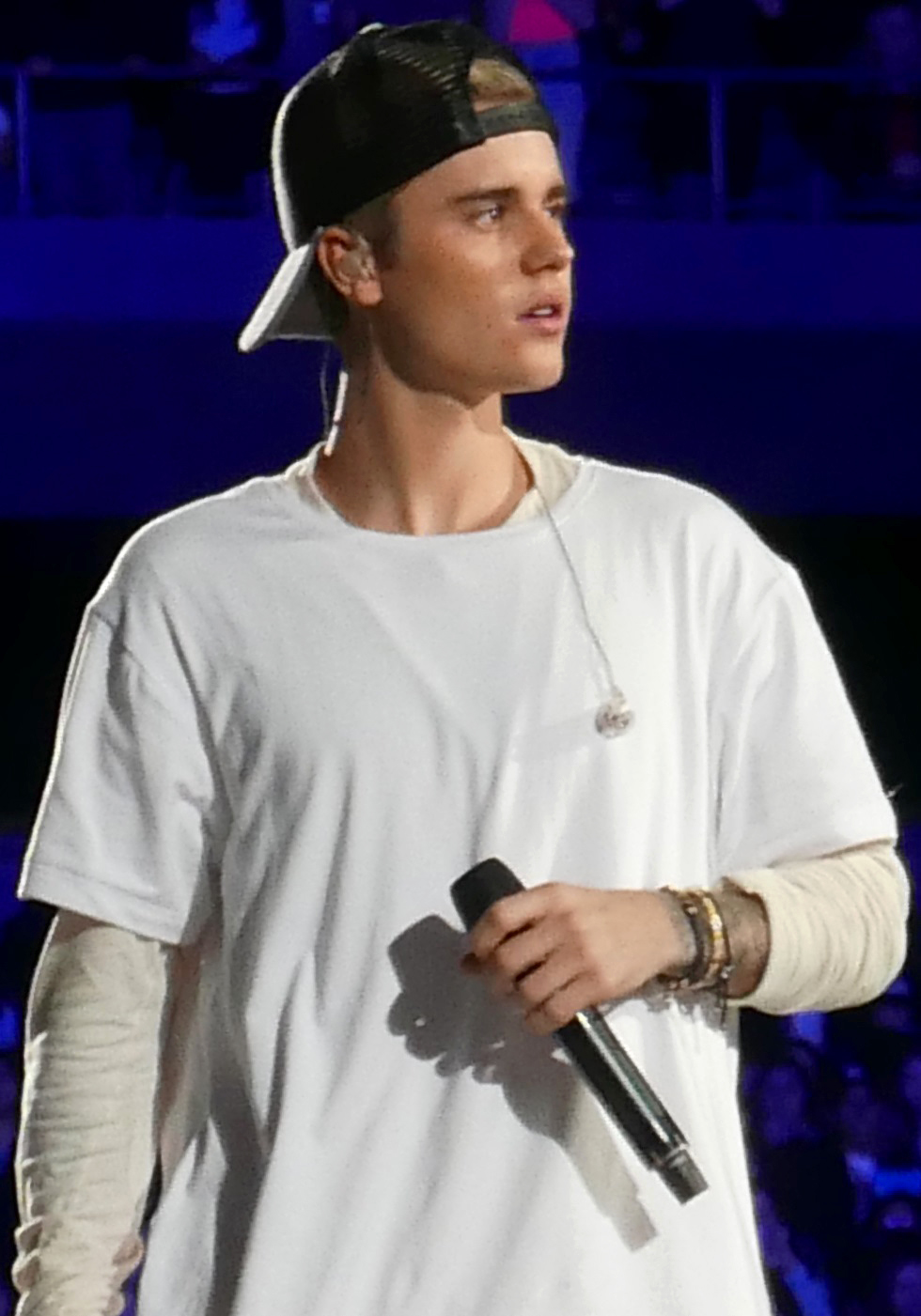
Justin Bieber gained three number ones in 2015 with What Do You Mean?, Sorry and Love Yourself.

The Irish Singles Chart ranks the best-performing singles in Ireland, as compiled by Chart-Track on behalf of the Irish Recorded Music Association.

Issue date	Song	Artist(s)	Reference
1 January	"Uptown Funk"	Mark Ronson featuring Bruno Mars	
8 January	"Uptown Funk"	Mark Ronson featuring Bruno Mars	
15 January	"Uptown Funk"	Mark Ronson featuring Bruno Mars	
22 January	"Uptown Funk"	Mark Ronson featuring Bruno Mars	
29 January	"Uptown Funk"	Mark Ronson featuring Bruno Mars	
5 February	"Love Me like You Do"	Ellie Goulding	
12 February	"Love Me like You Do"	Ellie Goulding	
19 February	"Love Me like You Do"	Ellie Goulding	
26 February	"Love Me like You Do"	Ellie Goulding	
5 March	"Love Me like You Do"	Ellie Goulding	
12 March	"Love Me like You Do"	Ellie Goulding	
19 March	"FourFiveSeconds"	Rihanna, Kanye West and Paul McCartney	
26 March	"Hold Back the River"	James Bay	
2 April	"Cry for Help"	Hometown	
9 April	"Cheerleader"	OMI	
16 April	"See You Again"	Wiz Khalifa featuring Charlie Puth	
23 April	"See You Again"	Wiz Khalifa featuring Charlie Puth	
30 April	"See You Again"	Wiz Khalifa featuring Charlie Puth	
7 May	"See You Again"	Wiz Khalifa featuring Charlie Puth	
14 May	"Cheerleader"	OMI	
21 May	"Cheerleader"	OMI	
28 May	"Cheerleader"	OMI	
4 June	"Cheerleader"	OMI	
11 June	"Lean On"	Major Lazer and DJ Snake featuring MØ	
18 June	"Lean On"	Major Lazer and DJ Snake featuring MØ	
25 June	"Lean On"	Major Lazer and DJ Snake featuring MØ	
2 July	"Lean On"	Major Lazer and DJ Snake featuring MØ	
9 July	"Are You with Me"	Lost Frequencies	
16 July	"Are You with Me"	Lost Frequencies	
23 July	"Are You with Me"	Lost Frequencies	
30 July	"Are You with Me"	Lost Frequencies	
6 August	"Drag Me Down"	One Direction	
13 August	"Marvin Gaye"	Charlie Puth featuring Meghan Trainor	
20 August	"Can't Feel My Face"	The Weeknd	
27 August	"Can't Feel My Face"	The Weeknd	
3 September	"What Do You Mean?"	Justin Bieber	
10 September	"What Do You Mean?"	Justin Bieber	
17 September	"What Do You Mean?"	Justin Bieber	
24 September	"What Do You Mean?"	Justin Bieber	
1 October	"What Do You Mean?"	Justin Bieber	
8 October	"What Do You Mean?"	Justin Bieber	
15 October	"What Do You Mean?"	Justin Bieber	
22 October	"Perfect"	One Direction	
29 October	"Hello"	Adele	
5 November	"Hello"	Adele	
12 November	"Hello"	Adele	
19 November	"Hello"	Adele	
26 November	"Sorry"	Justin Bieber	
3 December	"Sorry"	Justin Bieber	
10 December	"Love Yourself"	Justin Bieber	
17 December	"Love Yourself"	Justin Bieber	
24 December	"Love Yourself"	Justin Bieber	
31 December	"Love Yourself"	Justin Bieber	

== Number-one artists ==
Position	Artist	Weeks at No. 1
1	Justin Bieber	13
2	Ellie Goulding	6
3	Mark Ronson	5
3	Bruno Mars	5
3	OMI	5
3	Charlie Puth	5
7	Wiz Khalifa	4
7	Major Lazer	4
7	DJ Snake	4
7	MØ	4
7	Lost Frequencies	4
7	Adele	4
13	The Weeknd	2
13	One Direction	2
15	Rihanna	1
15	Kanye West	1
15	Paul McCartney	1
15	Hometown	1
15	James Bay	1
15	Meghan Trainor	1

== See also ==
- List of number-one albums of 2015 (Ireland)
