= List of Irish Independent Albums Chart number ones of 2021 =

This is a list of albums that reached number-one on the Irish Independent Albums Chart in 2021. The charts were compiled by Irish Recorded Music Association (IRMA).

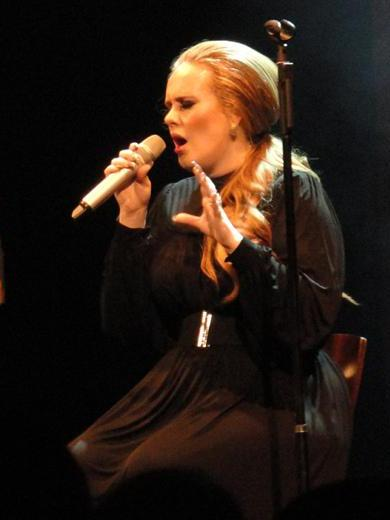
Adele's third album, 25, reached number one 10 non-consecutive weeks in 2021

== Chart history ==
List of Irish Independent Albums Chart number-one albums of 2021
| Issue date | Album | Artist | Label | Ref |
|---|---|---|---|---|
| 1 January | AM | Arctic Monkeys | Domino | |
| 8 January | AM | Arctic Monkeys | Domino | |
| 15 January | AM | Arctic Monkeys | Domino | |
| 22 January | Spare Ribs | Sleaford Mods | Rough Trade | |
| 29 January | Isles | Bicep | Ninja Tune | |
| 5 February | Collapsed in Sunbeams | Arlo Parks | Transgressive | |
| 12 February | Shore | Fleet Foxes | Anti | |
| 19 February | AM | Arctic Monkeys | Domino | |
| 26 February | As the Love Continues | Mogwai | Rock Action | |
| 5 March | Awake You Lie | Wyvern Lingo | Rubyworks | |
| 12 March | AM | Arctic Monkeys | Domino | |
| 19 March | Wild West | Central Cee | Central Cee | |
| 26 March | Wild West | Central Cee | Central Cee | |
| 2 April | For Those I Love | For Those I Love | September Recordings | |
| 9 April | 1963 | Apella | Apella | |
| 16 April | Live At Sydney Opera House | Glen Hansard | Plateau | |
| 23 April | Flu Game | AJ Tracey | Revenge | |
| 30 April | Flu Game | AJ Tracey | Revenge | |
| 7 May | If I Could Make It Go Quiet | Girl in Red | World In Red | |
| 14 May | Flu Game | AJ Tracey | Revenge | |
| 21 May | Skellig | David Gray | Laugh A Minute | |
| 28 May | Loveless | My Bloody Valentine | Domino | |
| 4 June | AM | Arctic Monkeys | Domino | |
| 11 June | Blue Weekend | Wolf Alice | Dirty Hit | |
| 18 June | Back the Way We Came: Vol. 1 (2011–2021) | Noel Gallagher's High Flying Birds | Sour Mash | |
| 25 June | Inside (The Songs) | Bo Burnham | Imperial | |
| 2 July | Town's Dead | Kojaque | PIAS | |
| 9 July | Inside (The Songs) | Bo Burnham | Imperial | |
| 16 July | Inside (The Songs) | Bo Burnham | Imperial | |
| 23 July | All Over the Place | KSI | BMG | |
| 30 July | If This Is Rock and Roll, I Want My Old Job Back | The Saw Doctors | Shamtown | |
| 6 August | 20 | David Kitt | David Kitt | |
| 13 August | All Over the Place | KSI | BMG | |
| 20 August | Loving in Stereo | Jungle | Caiola | |
| 27 August | Fever Dreams | Villagers | Domino | |
| 3 September | All Over the Place | KSI | BMG | |
| 10 September | All Over the Place | KSI | BMG | |
| 17 September | In the Game | Mick Flannery and Susan O'Neill | Rosa | |
| 24 September | In the Game | Mick Flannery and Susan O'Neill | Rosa | |
| 1 October | The Art of Disappearing | Pa Sheehy | Stone Boat | |
| 8 October | 25 | Adele | XL | |
| 15 October | 25 | Adele | XL | |
| 22 October | 25 | Adele | XL | |
| 29 October | 25 | Adele | XL | |
| 5 November | 25 | Adele | XL | |
| 12 November | Kid A Mnesia | Radiohead | XL | |
| 19 November | 25 | Adele | XL | |
| 26 November | 25 | Adele | XL | |
| 3 December | 25 | Adele | XL | |
| 10 December | 25 | Adele | XL | |
| 17 December | Little Old Town | Nathan Carter | Sharpe Music | |
| 24 December | Little Old Town | Nathan Carter | Sharpe Music | |
| 31 December | 25 | Adele | XL | |

== See also ==
- List of number-one albums of 2021 (Ireland)
- List of number-one singles of 2021 (Ireland)
