= List of Irish Independent Albums Chart number ones of 2017 =

Number one albums in Ireland as compiled by IRMA in 2017

This is a list of albums that reached number-one on the Irish Independent Albums Chart in 2017. The charts were compiled by Irish Recorded Music Association (IRMA).

== Chart history ==
List of Irish Independent Albums Chart number-one albums of 2017
Issue date	Album	Artist	Label	Ref
6 January	25	Adele	XL	
13 January	25	Adele	XL	
20 January	I See You	The xx	Young Turks	
27 January	I See You	The xx	Young Turks	
3 February	I See You	The xx	Young Turks	
10 February	Essential	Colm Wilkinson	Colm Wilkinson	
17 February	25	Adele	XL	
24 February	25	Adele	XL	
3 March	Gang Signs and Prayer	Stormzy	Merky	
10 March	Gang Signs and Prayer	Stormzy	Merky	
17 March	Gang Signs and Prayer	Stormzy	Merky	
24 March	Gang Signs and Prayer	Stormzy	Merky	
31 March	Gang Signs and Prayer	Stormzy	Merky	
7 April	Gang Signs and Prayer	Stormzy	Merky	
14 April	Pure Comedy	Father John Misty	Bella Union	
21 April	Gang Signs and Prayer	Stormzy	Merky	
28 April	Tears on the Dancefloor	Steps	Steps Music	
5 May	Something Else	The Cranberries	BMG	
12 May	Lovely Creatures: The Best of Nick Cave and the Bad Seeds	Nick Cave and the Bad Seeds	BMG	
19 May	Turn Your Face to the Sun	I Draw Slow	Compass	
26 May	25	Adele	XL	
2 June	True Care	James Vincent McMorrow	Faction	
9 June	Trust the Wire	The Coronas	So Far So Good	
16 June	Trust the Wire	The Coronas	So Far So Good	
23 June	Livin the Dream	Nathan Carter	Sharpe Music	
30 June	Ok Computer	Radiohead	XL	
7 July	Trust the Wire	The Coronas	So Far So Good	
14 July	Ok Computer	Radiohead	XL	
21 July	Livin the Dream	Nathan Carter	Sharpe Music	
28 July	Trust the Wire	The Coronas	So Far So Good	
4 August	Trust the Wire	The Coronas	So Far So Good	
11 August	Trust the Wire	The Coronas	So Far So Good	
18 August	You	Dodie	Dodie	
25 August	Trust the Wire	The Coronas	So Far So Good	
1 September	Villains	Queens of the Stone Age	Matador	
8 September	Villains	Queens of the Stone Age	Matador	
15 September	Sleep Well Beast	The National	4AD	
22 September	Sleep Well Beast	The National	4AD	
29 September	Gemini	Macklemore	Bendo	
6 October	OK	Otherkin	Rubyworks	
13 October	Sleep Well Beast	The National	4AD	
20 October	Dance With Me	Swing Cats	Collective MGMT	
27 October	Gemini	Macklemore	Bendo	
3 November	The Blue Room	Martin Hayes Quartet	251	
10 November	Decade - The Best of	King Highs	Celtic Collections	
17 November	Decade - The Best of	King Highs	Celtic Collections	
24 November	Low in High School	Morrissey	BMG	
1 December	Who Built the Moon?	Noel Gallagher's High Flying Birds	Sour Mash	
8 December	Who Built the Moon?	Noel Gallagher's High Flying Birds	Sour Mash	
15 December	Who Built the Moon?	Noel Gallagher's High Flying Birds	Sour Mash	
22 December	Who Built the Moon?	Noel Gallagher's High Flying Birds	Sour Mash	
29 December	Who Built the Moon?	Noel Gallagher's High Flying Birds	Sour Mash	

== See also ==
- List of number-one albums of 2017 (Ireland)
- List of number-one singles of 2017 (Ireland)
