= List of number-one singles of 2022 (Ireland) =

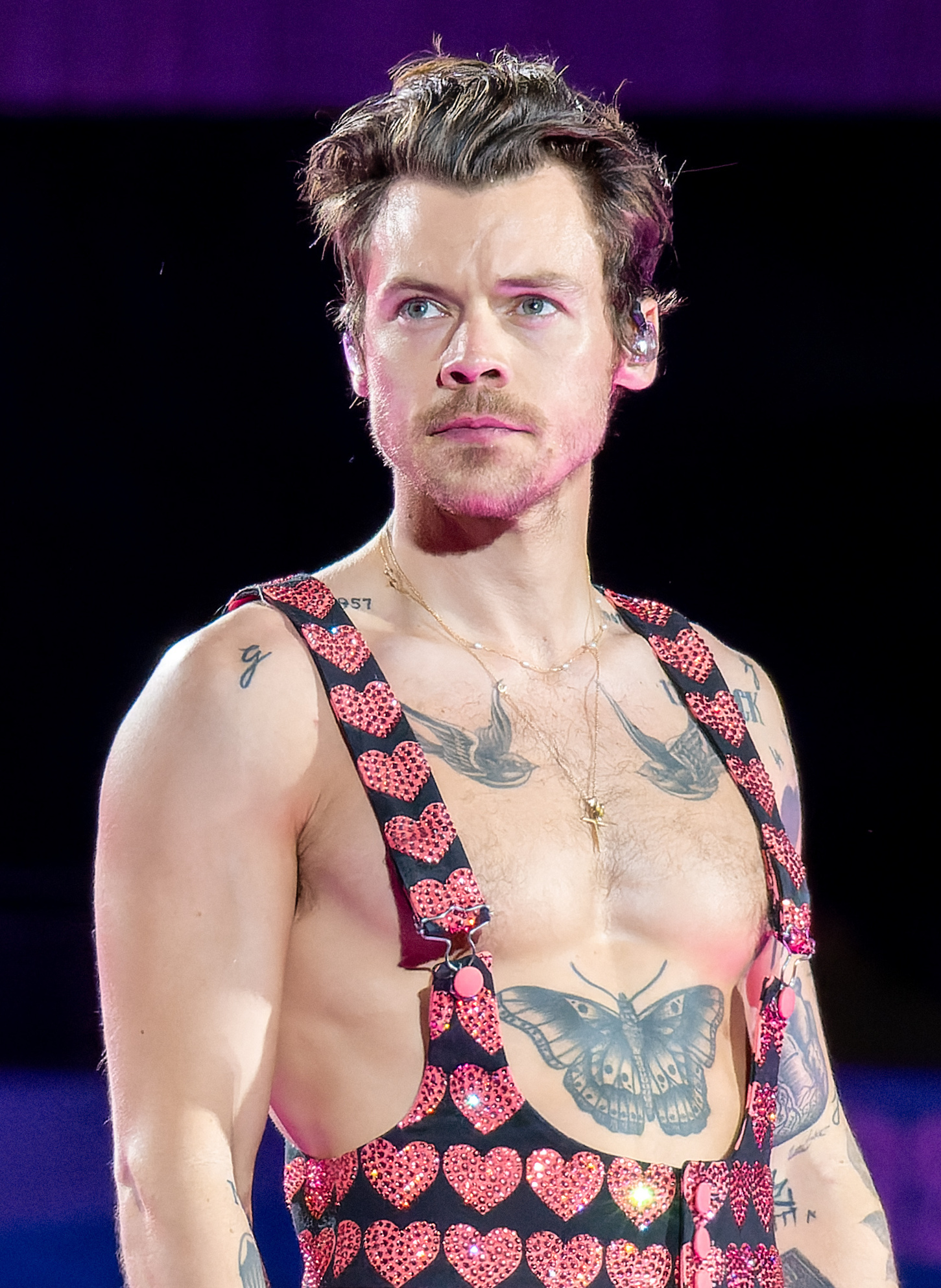
Harry Styles spent ten weeks at number one this year.

The Irish Singles Chart ranks the best-performing singles in Ireland, as compiled by the Official Charts Company on behalf of the Irish Recorded Music Association.

Issue date	Song	Artist(s)	Reference
7 January	"ABCDEFU"	Gayle	
14 January	"Fingers Crossed"	Lauren Spencer-Smith	
21 January	"ABCDEFU"	Gayle	
28 January	"ABCDEFU"	Gayle	
4 February	"We Don't Talk About Bruno"	Adassa, Stephanie Beatriz, Mauro Castillo, Rhenzy Feliz, Carolina Gaitán and Diane Guerrero	
11 February	"We Don't Talk About Bruno"	Adassa, Stephanie Beatriz, Mauro Castillo, Rhenzy Feliz, Carolina Gaitán and Diane Guerrero	
18 February	"Where Are You Now"	Lost Frequencies and Calum Scott	
25 February	"Make Me Feel Good"	Belters Only featuring Jazzy	
4 March	"Make Me Feel Good"	Belters Only featuring Jazzy	
11 March	"Starlight"	Dave	
18 March	"Starlight"	Dave	
25 March	"Starlight"	Dave	
1 April	"Starlight"	Dave	
8 April	"As It Was"	Harry Styles	
15 April	"As It Was"	Harry Styles	
22 April	"As It Was"	Harry Styles	
29 April	"As It Was"	Harry Styles	
6 May	"As It Was"	Harry Styles	
13 May	"As It Was"	Harry Styles	
20 May	"As It Was"	Harry Styles	
27 May	"As It Was"	Harry Styles	
3 June	"As It Was"	Harry Styles	
10 June	"As It Was"	Harry Styles	
17 June	"Running Up That Hill"	Kate Bush	
24 June	"Running Up That Hill"	Kate Bush	
1 July	"Running Up That Hill"	Kate Bush	
8 July	"Running Up That Hill"	Kate Bush	
15 July	"Running Up That Hill"	Kate Bush	
22 July	"Running Up That Hill"	Kate Bush	
29 July	"Running Up That Hill"	Kate Bush	
5 August	"Break My Soul"	Beyoncé	
12 August	"Break My Soul"	Beyoncé	
19 August	"B.O.T.A. (Baddest of Them All)"	Eliza Rose and Interplanetary Criminal	
26 August	"B.O.T.A. (Baddest of Them All)"	Eliza Rose and Interplanetary Criminal	
2 September	"B.O.T.A. (Baddest of Them All)"	Eliza Rose and Interplanetary Criminal	
9 September	"B.O.T.A. (Baddest of Them All)"	Eliza Rose and Interplanetary Criminal	
16 September	"B.O.T.A. (Baddest of Them All)"	Eliza Rose and Interplanetary Criminal	
23 September	"B.O.T.A. (Baddest of Them All)"	Eliza Rose and Interplanetary Criminal	
30 September	"Unholy"	Sam Smith and Kim Petras	
7 October	"Unholy"	Sam Smith and Kim Petras	
14 October	"Unholy"	Sam Smith and Kim Petras	
21 October	"Unholy"	Sam Smith and Kim Petras	
28 October	"Anti-Hero"	Taylor Swift	
4 November	"Anti-Hero"	Taylor Swift	
11 November	"Anti-Hero"	Taylor Swift	
18 November	"Anti-Hero"	Taylor Swift	
25 November	"Anti-Hero"	Taylor Swift	
2 December	"Anti-Hero"	Taylor Swift	
9 December	"Escapism"	Raye featuring 070 Shake	
16 December	"Escapism"	Raye featuring 070 Shake	
23 December	"Escapism"	Raye featuring 070 Shake	
30 December	"Last Christmas"	Wham!	

== Number-one artists ==
Position	Artist	Weeks at No. 1
1	Harry Styles	10
2	Kate Bush	7
3	Eliza Rose	6
3	Interplanetary Criminal	6
3	Taylor Swift	6
4	Dave	4
4	Sam Smith	4
4	Kim Petras	4
5	Gayle	3
5	Raye	3
5	070 Shake	3
6	Adassa	2
6	Stephanie Beatriz	2
6	Mauro Castillo	2
6	Rhenzy Feliz	2
6	Carolina Gaitán	2
6	Diane Guerrero	2
6	Belters Only	2
6	Jazzy	2
6	Beyoncé	2
7	Lauren Spencer-Smith	1
7	Lost Frequencies	1
7	Calum Scott	1
7	Wham!	1

== See also ==
- List of number-one albums of 2022 (Ireland)
