= List of number-one albums of 2022 (Ireland) =

The Irish Albums Chart ranks the best-performing albums in Ireland, as compiled by the Official Charts Company on behalf of the Irish Recorded Music Association.

== Chart history ==
Issue date	Album	Artist	Reference
7 January	=	Ed Sheeran	
14 January	Dawn FM	The Weeknd	
21 January	Dawn FM	The Weeknd	
28 January	Bat Out of Hell	Meat Loaf	
4 February	Sour	Olivia Rodrigo	
11 February	Sour	Olivia Rodrigo	
18 February	=	Ed Sheeran	
25 February	Sour	Olivia Rodrigo	
4 March	Sour	Olivia Rodrigo	
11 March	If My Wife New I'd Be Dead	CMAT	
18 March	Sour	Olivia Rodrigo	
25 March	Crash	Charli XCX	
1 April	Sour	Olivia Rodrigo	
8 April	Unlimited Love	Red Hot Chili Peppers	
15 April	Sour	Olivia Rodrigo	
22 April	=	Ed Sheeran	
29 April	Skinty Fia	Fontaines D.C.	
6 May	=	Ed Sheeran	
13 May	We	Arcade Fire	
20 May	Mr. Morale & the Big Steppers	Kendrick Lamar	
27 May	Harry's House	Harry Styles	
3 June	Harry's House	Harry Styles	
10 June	Harry's House	Harry Styles	
17 June	Harry's House	Harry Styles	
24 June	Harry's House	Harry Styles	
1 July	Harry's House	Harry Styles	
8 July	Last Night in the Bittersweet	Paolo Nutini	
15 July	Harry's House	Harry Styles	
22 July	Harry's House	Harry Styles	
29 July	The Sweetest Part	Gavin James	
5 August	Renaissance	Beyoncé	
12 August	Harry's House	Harry Styles	
19 August	Harry's House	Harry Styles	
26 August	Harry's House	Harry Styles	
2 September	Harry's House	Harry Styles	
9 September	Yungblud	Yungblud	
16 September	XXV	Robbie Williams	
23 September	Harry's House	Harry Styles	
30 September	Harry's House	Harry Styles	
7 October	Harry's House	Harry Styles	
14 October	Time Stopped	The Coronas	
21 October	Being Funny in a Foreign Language	The 1975	
28 October	Midnights	Taylor Swift	
4 November	Midnights	Taylor Swift	
11 November	Midnights	Taylor Swift	
18 November	Midnights	Taylor Swift	
25 November	Sonder	Dermot Kennedy	
2 December	Sonder	Dermot Kennedy	
9 December	Sonder	Dermot Kennedy	
16 December	Sonder	Dermot Kennedy	
23 December	A Family Christmas	Andrea Bocelli, Matteo Bocelli and Virginia Bocelli	
30 December	Sonder	Dermot Kennedy	

== Number-one artists ==
Position	Artist	Weeks at No. 1
1	Harry Styles	15
2	Olivia Rodrigo	7
3	Dermot Kennedy	5
4	Ed Sheeran	4
4	Taylor Swift	4
5	The Weeknd	2
6	Meat Loaf	1
6	CMAT	1
6	Charli XCX	1
6	Red Hot Chili Peppers	1
6	Fontaines D.C.	1
6	Arcade Fire	1
6	Kendrick Lamar	1
6	Paolo Nutini	1
6	Gavin James	1
6	Beyoncé	1
6	Yungblud	1
6	Robbie Williams	1
6	The Coronas	1
6	The 1975	1
6	Andrea Bocelli	1
6	Matteo Bocelli	1
6	Virginia Bocelli	1

== See also ==
- List of number-one singles of 2022 (Ireland)
