= Keywest =

Irish musical group

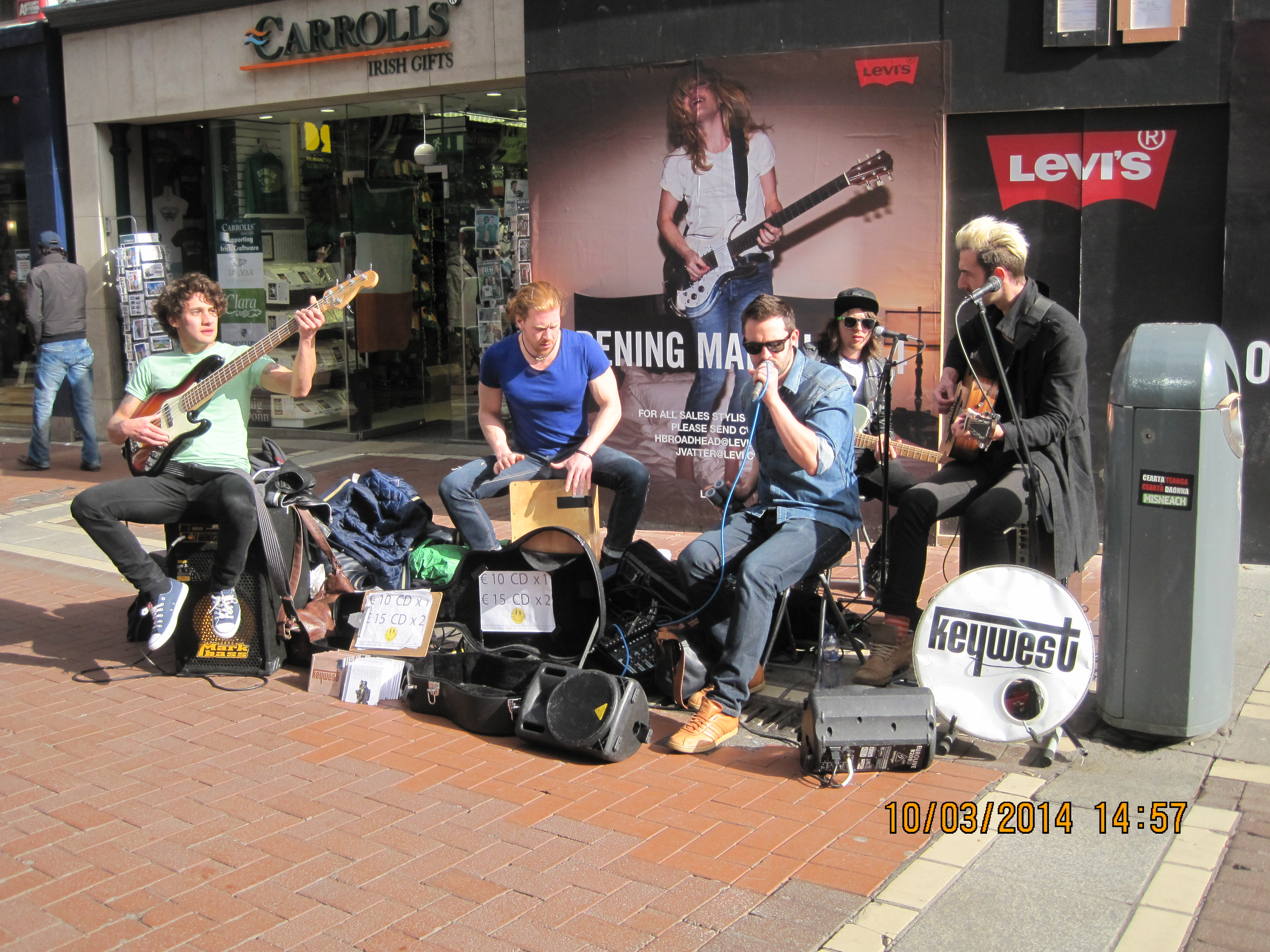
- Keywest busking on Grafton Street, Dublin, 2014

Background information
- Origin: Dublin, Ireland and London, England
- Genre: Pop-folk
- Years active: 2010–present
- Members: Andrew Kavanagh; Andrew Glover; Luke Murphy; Conor Ray
- Past members: Sam Marder; Jimi Lock; Harry Sullivan
- Website: https://www.keywestofficial.com

Keywest is an Irish pop-folk band formed in Dublin. Beginning as street performers, the band has released five albums and two EPs since 2012.

== History ==
=== 2010: Formation ===
The band was initially formed as a duo by founding members Andrew Kavanagh and Andrew Glover, who were childhood friends in Artane, Dublin. They began street performances (also known as busking) in Galway before relocating to Dublin to perform on Grafton Street, a location known for its street performers.

=== 2012: The Message ===
Their debut album, The Message, was released in 2012 via Alphastar Records. It peaked at number 15 on the Irish charts, number two on the Irish iTunes chart and has since been certified triple-platinum in Ireland. The album was self-produced, with engineering by Mark Needham. The album was released as a double CD, with the first disc containing the main album and second disc being the unreleased EP.

In 2012, Keywest was nominated for Best New Act at the Meteor Awards, while The Message was nominated for Best Debut Album in the Hot Press Hotties Awards. The band also signed a worldwide publishing deal with Peermusic in Los Angeles that year.

=== 2013: Electric Love EP ===
The band followed their debut album with the Electric Love EP, which featured the title track and lead single, "Electric Love". It was released independently through the band's label, Sonic Realm Records, and the single reached number one on the Irish charts.

=== 2015: Joyland ===
In 2014, the band won Best Street Artist/Busker at the Hot Press Awards. In 2015, the band was fined for exceeding noise levels under Dublin's busking by-law.

Keywest released their second album, Joyland, in September 2015, and it debuted at number two on the Official Irish Chart; the album reached number one the following week.

=== 2016: This Summer EP ===
In 2016, Keywest released the This Summer EP, featuring the lead track of the same name. The EP was independently released through the band's label, Sonic Realm Records.

=== 2018: True North ===
The band's third album, True North, was released on 30 March 2018. It entered the Irish charts at number three, reaching number one on the Independent Music Chart. Keywest received three nominations at the 2018 Irish Post Music Awards: Best Song, Best Album, and Best Band.

=== 2019: Ordinary Superhero ===
In November 2018, Keywest signed to Marshall Records. Their fourth album, Ordinary Superhero, was released on 18 October 2019 and reached number 8 on the official Irish Album Chart. The song "I'm Not Me Without You" features Irish singer Una Healy.

The title track, "Ordinary Superhero," was released at the start of the COVID-19 pandemic in conjunction with Irish and UK charities supplying PPE to frontline workers. The music video for the song depicted frontline workers during the pandemic.

As of 2025, the band operates independently, funding its activities through direct sales and platforms like Patreon.

=== 2026: One More For The Road ===
On September 25, 2026, Keywest released their newest album.

== Members ==
=== Current members ===
- Andrew Kavanagh (Kav) - lead vocalist, harmonica (2010–present)
- Andrew Glover (Glove) - backing vocalist, acoustic guitar, piano (2010–present)
- Luke Murphy - backing vocalist, electric guitar (?-present)
- Conor Ray - percussion, drums (?-present)

=== Former members ===
- Sam Marder - bass guitar (2010-?)
- Jimi Lock - lead guitar (2010-?)
- Eamonn Hegarty - drums (2010–2012)
- Harry Sullivan (H) - drums (2012-?)

== Awards and nominations ==
- Best New Act – Meteor Awards 2012 (nominated)
- Best Debut Album – Hot Press Hotties Awards, 2012 (nominated)^{[}8^{]}
- Best Street Act – 98FM Best of Dublin Awards 2014 (winner)^{[9]}
- Best Street Act – 98FM Best of Dublin Awards 2015 (winner)
- Most Promising Artist – Hot Press Hotties Awards 2015 (winner)
- Best Song – Irish Post Music Awards 2018 (nominated)
- Best Album – Irish Post Music Awards 2018 (nominated)
- Best Act – Irish Post Music Awards 2018 (nominated)

== Discography ==
Keywest discography
- Studio albums: 5

=== Studio albums ===
Year	Album details	Peak chart positions
Year	Album details	IRL
2012	The Message: Released: 24 February 2012; Formats: CD, download	15
2015	Joyland: Released: 25 September 2015; Formats: CD, download	1
2018	True North: Released: 30 March 2018; Formats: CD, download	3
2019	Ordinary Superhero: Released: 11 October 2019; Formats: CD, download	8
2026	One More for the Road: Released: 25 September 2026; Formats: CD, download	1

=== Singles ===
Year	Title	Peak chart positions	Album
Year	Title	IRL	Album
2009	"Miss You Most"	6	
2011	"Back into Your Arms"	25	The Message
2012	"Feels So Cruel"	—	The Message
2012	"In the Fight For Love"	—	The Message
2013	"Electric Love"	55	
2015	"All My Mistakes"	—	Joyland
2015	"Carousel"	84	Joyland
2015	"This Is Heartbreak"	—	Joyland
2016	"This Summer"		True North
2017	"The Little Things"		True North
2017	"Cold Hands"		True North
2018	"Something Beautiful"		True North
"—" denotes a title that did not chart.

== See also ==
- Music of Ireland
