= Tommy Fleming (musician) =

Irish singer (born 1971)

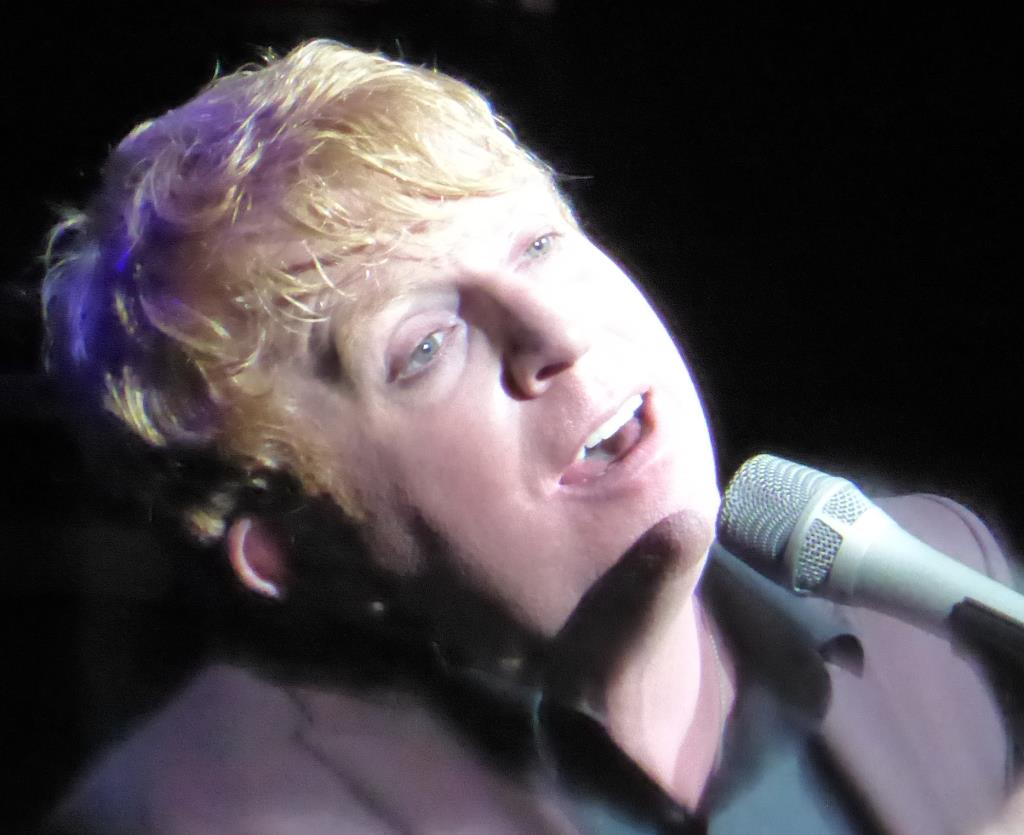
- Tommy Fleming, 2014

Background information
- Born: 15 May 1971 (age 55); Aclare, County Sligo, Ireland
- Genre: Folk music
- Occupation: Singer
- Instruments: Vocals
- Years active: 1996–present
- Website: tommyfleming.net

Tommy Fleming (born 15 May 1971) is an Irish singer. He rose to fame in the early 1990s after he was asked to tour the US with Phil Coulter. He soon established himself as a solo artist and found his greatest success singing traditional Irish music, both old and contemporary. Fleming has toured extensively throughout Ireland, UK, United States, the Netherlands and Australia.

== Biography ==
From an early age Fleming's natural singing talent was on show in local talent competitions and concerts. He sang in public for the first time in 1978 at a concert put on by Kilmactigue National School, which he attended. After finishing secondary school in 1990, he played the local scene with a couple of bands, but it was his meeting with composer Phil Coulter in Westport, County Mayo, that changed his career. Within a few short months of this meeting, he appeared at the Cork Opera House, and the National Concert Hall in Dublin. He then went on a tour of the United States, which included appearances at Carnegie Hall and the Boston Symphony Hall.

After his return to Ireland, he joined the group De Dannan. (Mary Black, Maura O'Connell, and Dolores Keane had been previous lead vocalists of this group.) He performed his first show with De Dannan in the Royal Concert Hall, Glasgow in January 1994. With De Dannan, Fleming's voice was brought to Australia, China, Hong Kong, and, once again, the United States.

== Career ==
When Fleming was asked how he would describe his genre of music he confessed that it is not opera nor rock 'n' roll. He said that he is just "very traditional and likes a song with a good story". When he is touring, he is accompanied by David Hayes, who plays piano and keyboard. Hayes produces Fleming's albums and is the musical director of his shows. Fleming's first solo effort after leaving De Dannan, Different Side of Life, was released in 1996.

In 1998, Fleming released Restless Spirit. In early 1998 while on the promotional tour for this album he was almost killed in a car accident returning to his native County Sligo. He escaped from the burning car with a broken neck which put his career in jeopardy. He ended up wearing a cranial halo for three months. After this incident Fleming was told there was a chance he might not be able to walk again. The woman who rescued Fleming at the time was his wife Tina. Fleming said "She took over my management and helped steer me in the right direction".

Sand & Water and The Contender were the two albums that followed Restless Spirit. The Contender brought Fleming back to the roots of traditional Irish music. The continued successes of his albums throughout 2000 and 2001 would lead to his first tour of Japan.

On 12 December 2004, Fleming recorded a concert at Knock Shrine Basilica in Knock, County Mayo. This building has a capacity of 5,000 and had been host to Holy Mass celebrated by Pope John Paul II on his visit to Ireland in September 1979. Fleming's was the first concert of its kind to be held there. PBS began broadcasting the recording of the concert under the title Voice of Hope in the United States in August 2005. Voice of Hope was his first album to be released in North America.

In 2006, Fleming released his first studio album in three years, entitled A Life Like Mine. It included songs that Fleming had wanted to record for some time, including Jimmy MacCarthy's "Mystic Lipstick" and Phil Coulter's "Scorn Not His Simplicity". The album went straight to number 5 in the Album charts.

In 2007, Fleming recorded his new live show, A Journey Home, at Ireland's National Events Centre in Killarney to an audience of 2,000. Released on CD and DVD in 2008, it features 22 songs from Ireland's most celebrated and acclaimed writers and poets. A Journey Home includes classical Irish songs such as "The Cliffs of Dooneen", "Isle of Innisfree" (the theme of the film, The Quiet Man, written by Dick Farrelly), and "Isle of Hope, Isle of Tears".

Upon the release of A Journey Home, Fleming was asked in an interview what would be next for him. He stated that he's going to work on his next studio album, as well as writing an autobiography.

He participated in season 4 of Celebrity Bainisteoir in 2011, managing St Patrick's GAA Club Dromard, Sligo.

In November 2014, Fleming participated in the inaugural cruise of the Australian performing arts on the MS Radiance of the Seas along with, among others, Cheryl Barker, David Hobson, Colin Lane, Teddy Tahu Rhodes, Simon Tedeschi, Elaine Paige, Marina Prior, and Jonathon Welch.

== Personal life ==
As of 2008, Tommy Fleming lived in Dublin. He met Tina Mitchell in 2002, and the pair married in Galway in 2006; she served as his manager. He separated from Tina in October 2025, and publicly came out as gay in 2026 after audio of a phone conversation between them leaked.

== Discography ==
=== Solo albums ===
- 1996 – Different Sides to Life
- 1997 – Sand and Water
- 1998 – Restless Spirit
- 2000 – The Contender
- 2003 – The Collection
- 2005 – A Voice of Hope
- 2006 – A Life Like Mine
- 2007 – A Journey Home
- 2009 – The Best Is Yet to Come
- 2009 – Song for a Winter's Night
- 2010 – Going Back
- 2014 – The West's Awake
- 2016 – Stories
- 2018 – A Voice of Hope II
- 2021 – All These Years

=== Charitable recordings ===
- 2006 – A Very Special Christmas (single – with Moya Brennan)
