= GfK Chart-Track =

Market research company in the United Kingdom

GfK Chart-Track is a market research company that monitors music, videos and software sales in the United Kingdom and was formed in 1996. In July 2008, GfK took a majority stake in the company.

In the UK the company produces the Official UK Software Charts on behalf of UKIE. Key report services include: UK Leisure Software, UK Hardware and Peripherals.

The company produced the Official Irish Music Charts and collected data daily from major and independent record stores in Ireland on behalf of the Irish Recorded Music Association until losing the contract at the end of 2016.
