= GfK =

German market research company

GfK SE

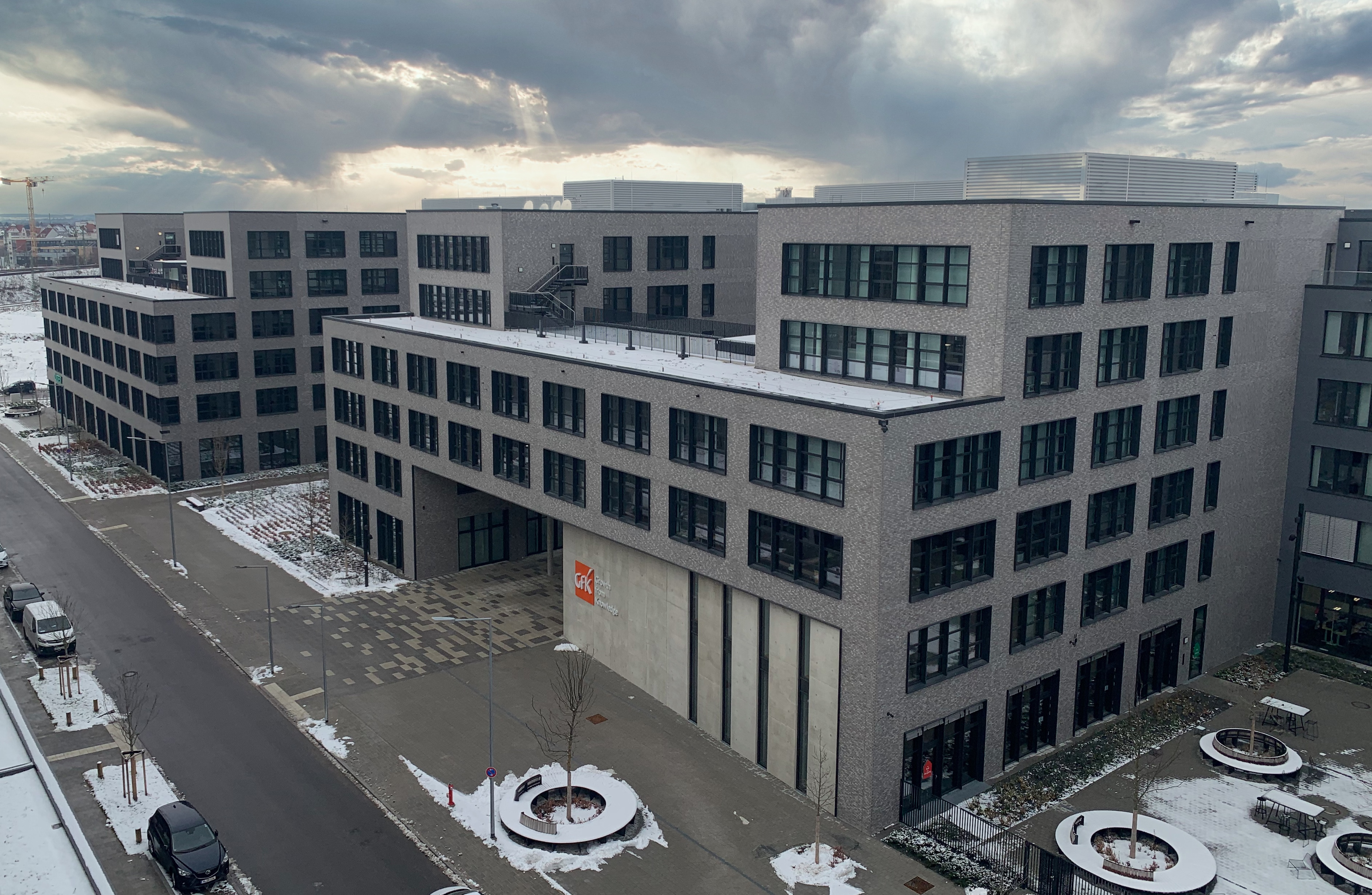
- Headquarters in Nuremberg, Germany
- Type: Societas Europaea
- Industry: Market research
- Founded: 1934; 92 years ago
- Headquarters: Nuremberg, Germany
- Key people: Peter Feld (CEO) Lars Nordmark (CFO) Thomas Ebeling (Chairman of the Supervisory Board)
- Revenue: €1.5 Billion (2014)
- Net income: €52.4 million (2014)
- Owner: Advent International
- Number of employees: 8,000+ (2021)
- Parent: NIQ
- Website: gfk.com

GfK (originally GfK-Nürnberg Gesellschaft für Konsumforschung e.V., 'Nuremberg Society for Consumer Research') is a German market research company that provides data and intelligence to the consumer goods industry. It is headquartered in Nuremberg and is a subsidiary of NIQ.

== History ==
GfK was founded as GfK-Nürnberg Gesellschaft für Konsumforschung e. V. in 1934 by university lecturers from Nuremberg, among them the future German Minister of Economic Affairs and Federal Chancellor Ludwig Erhard. The concept was developed by co-founder Wilhelm Vershofen.

Initially, the association conducted 71 different studies, including:

- Awareness of trademarks
- Personal care and soap consumption in Germany
- Structure of beverage consumption in Germany
- Patient and pharmaceuticals
- Motorist assessment of road maps from fuel companies

After the war, GfK’s activities from 1934 to 1945 were investigated by the American occupying powers. Following this investigation, GfK received a license to continue its activities in 1947.

In 1984, commercial activities were spun off into GfK GmbH, which was renamed GfK AG on January 23, 1990. At that time, the “GfK Association” was limited to promoting market and sales research.

In 2010, the company was the world's fourth-largest market research company by revenue.

In December 2016, the American private equity firm Kohlberg Kravis Roberts (KKR) made a takeover bid for 18.54 percent of the company's shares.

Since March 2017, GfK SE has been majority-owned (96.7%) by the investment fund Acceleratio Capital N.V., a holding company of KKR.

In the autumn of 2018, GfK’s French competitor Ipsos acquired a division of GfK with 1,000 staff dealing with client-specific projects for 105 million euros.

In 2020, GfK launched gfknewron, a new AI-powered platform. Therefore, customers can access relevant data in real time and receive recommendations for action based on predictions.

In July 2023, NIQ (formerly a part of Nielsen Holdings), a U.S. market research and consumer intelligence company owned by Advent International, gained approval from the European Union to acquire GfK after an antitrust investigation that began in June 2023. This approval was given under the condition of selling its consumer panel business, which went to the British market research company YouGov in July 2023. In July 2025, Advent exited its investment in NIQ/GFK via an IPO.

=== Acquisitions ===
In April 2005, it acquired NOP World (originally National Opinion Polls), based mostly in the United Kingdom, the United States and Italy, which was rated the world's ninth largest market research business.

In May 2008, it acquired an equity stake in Deep-Packet Inspection company Qosmos in order to track and monitor Internet usage for marketing research.

In 2016, GfK acquired Netquest and Wakoopa.

== Operations ==
GfK collects and processes data on consumer behavior. It collects data on over 180 million SKUs and surveys over two million people in 15 countries. Since 2020, GfK has offered its customers an AI-powered platform that uses relevant data to provide forecasts and produces recommendations to facilitate critical business decisions.

== See also ==
- GfK Entertainment charts
