= Irish Independent Albums Chart =

Music chart

The Irish Independent Albums Chart (also known as Independent Artist Albums or Top 20 Indie Albums) is a chart of best-selling independent album releases in Ireland. It is issued weekly by the Irish Recorded Music Association (IRMA) and complied on its behalf by GfK's Chart-Track until losing the contract at the end of 2016.

Chart rankings are based upon album sales compiled through electronically captured retail data each day from retailers' EPOS systems and certain digital retailers. Sales from major retailers, including HMV, Virgin, Tower and Golden Discs, were once excluded from the chart but data from major retailers and over forty other independent retailers now compose the chart.

As of the issue dated 20 November 2026, the current number-one album on the chart is Dopamine Chamber by Fontaines D.C..

== Publication ==
A new chart is compiled and released to the public by IRMA each Friday at 15:00 GMT. Each chart is dated with the "week-ending" database of the previous Thursday. Midweek versions of the chart are produced every day, allowing record companies and retailers to track sales trends. Upon its publication, The Irish Independent Albums Chart is released as a Top 20—featuring the twenty best-selling independent albums. However, Chart-Track's online archive only documents the top ten albums from each particular week.

== See also ==
- Irish Albums Chart
