= The Gloaming 3 =

Studio album by The Gloaming
- Released: 22 February 2019
- Studio: Reservoir Studios, New York
- Genre: World, Folk, Irish traditional, Celtic contemporary classical, jazz, chamber, post-rock, minimalism
- Length: 70:16
- Label: Real World Records
- Producer: Thomas Bartlett

The Gloaming chronology
Live at the NCH (2016)	The Gloaming 3 (2019)

The Gloaming 3 (also referred to as "3") is the third studio album by the contemporary Irish/American music group The Gloaming. It was released on February 22, 2019.

== Content ==
“Bronwyn Leigh”, which opens the set titled “Doctor O’Neill” was composed by Scottish fiddler Ryan McKasson.

Many of the album’s lyrics are sourced from extant poems:

- “My Lady Who Has Found The Tomb Unattended, is a 17th-century poem by Eoghan Ruadh mac Uilliam Óig Mhic an Bháird.
- “Áthas,” is a poem written by Liam Ó Muirthile.
- “Reo” is a poem written by Seán Ó Ríordáin, with additional lyrics from Ó Lionáird.

== Release and reception ==
The Gloaming 3 was released February 2019 to positive reviews.

In its favorable review, The Irish Times located the album at the "intersection where unapologetically traditional music-making sits so comfortably alongside the most visionary, forward-facing musical exploration."

Hot Press called the album "transcendent," and "even more beautiful than the previous two records."

Written in Music called it "exceptional... [an] insanely good album [from] one of the most important bands of our time."

Folk Radio called it "a bold, beguiling, magnificent album."

== Track listing ==
Credits are adapted from the album's liner notes. Information in brackets indicates individual tunes featured on a track.

No.	Title	Writer(s)	Length
1.	"Meáchan Rudaí (The Weight of Things)"	Ó Lionáird, Hayes, Ó Raghallaigh, Cahill, Bartlett, Johnson, Ó Muirthile	7:46
2.	"The Lobster"	Ó Lionáird, Hayes, Ó Raghallaigh, Cahill, Bartlett, Johnson	6:53
3.	"Áthas (Joy)"	Ó Lionáird, Hayes, Ó Raghallaigh, Cahill, Bartlett, Johnson, Ó Muirthile	4:49
4.	"The Pink House"	Ó Lionáird, Hayes, Ó Raghallaigh, Cahill, Bartlett, Johnson	8:39
5.	"Reo"	Ó Lionáird, Hayes, Ó Raghallaigh, Cahill, Bartlett, Johnson, Ó Riordáin	7:47
6.	"The Old Road to Garry"	Ó Lionáird, Hayes, Ó Raghallaigh, Cahill, Bartlett, Johnson	3:31
7.	"Sheehan’s Jigs"	Ó Lionáird, Hayes, Ó Raghallaigh, Cahill, Bartlett, Johnson	7:24
8.	"My Lady who has Found the Tomb Unattended"	Ó Lionáird, Hayes, Ó Raghallaigh, Cahill, Bartlett, Johnson	5:12
9.	"Doctor O'Neill" (Bronwyn Leigh, Patsy Geary’s, Doctor O’Neill)	Ó Lionáird, Hayes, Ó Raghallaigh, Cahill, Bartlett, Johnson, McKasson	10:36
10.	"Amhrán na nGleann (The Song of The Glens)"	Ó Lionáird, Hayes, Ó Raghallaigh, Cahill, Bartlett, Johnson	7:39
Total length:			70:16

== Personnel ==
Music

- Iarla Ó Lionáird – vocals
- Caoimhín Ó Raghallaigh – Hardanger d'Amore
- Dennis Cahill – guitar
- Martin Hayes – fiddle
- Thomas Bartlett – piano

Production

- Produced by Thomas Bartlett
- Engineered & Mixed by Patrick Dillett
- Additional engineering by James Yost
- Recorded at Reservoir Studios, New York
- Mastered by UE Nastasi at Sterling Sound
- Published by Real World Works Ltd.
- Management by BARQUE LLC
- Design by Real World
- Cover Image by Robert and Shana ParkeHarrison
- Inside Photograph by Heidi Solander
