= 2 (The Gloaming album) =

Studio album by The Gloaming
- Released: 26 February 2016
- Recorded: December 2015
- Studios: Real World Studios, Wiltshire, UK
- Genres: World, Folk, Irish traditional, Celtic contemporary classical, jazz, chamber, post-rock, minimalism
- Length: 1:09:44
- Labels: Real World Records (Rest of World); Brassland (North America); Justin Time Records (Canada); Planet Records (Australia)
- Producer: Thomas Bartlett

The Gloaming chronology
The Gloaming (2014)	2 (2016)	Live at the NCH (2018)

Professional ratings
Aggregate scores
Source	Rating
Metacritic	84/100
Review scores
Source	Rating
Financial Times	4/5 stars
The Guardian	4/5 stars
The Irish Times	5/5 stars
Paste Magazine	(8.2/10)

The Gloaming 2 (also referred to as "2") is the second studio album by the contemporary Irish/American music group The Gloaming. It was released on 26 February 2016 on Real World Records, and on Brassland Records in America, Justin Time Records in Canada, and Planet Records in Australia.

The album debuted at No.1 in the Irish Album Chart and was met with critical acclaim.

== Background and recording ==
In an interview with the Irish Times in August 2014, fiddle player and band founder Martin Hayes said that the quintet were all eager to begin work on new material. In December 2015, The Gloaming entered Real World Studios in Wiltshire, England to record material that had mostly been written and previewed during the group’s 2015 touring schedule.

Commenting at the time on the recording sessions, vocalist Iarla Ó Lionáird felt that a "stronger" record was being made to the band’s 2015 debut, and that while the group had not become completely removed from its "initial creative area", something of a departure had been made. Hayes, meanwhile, said that the album had "more feeling" than its predecessor because the five individuals in the band had bonded more deeply in terms of a shared aesthetic in the interim period. Hayes added that the music on The Gloaming 2 possibly had a euphoric and joyful quality, a sentiment shared by bandmate and fellow fiddle player Caoimhín Ó Raghallaigh.

Lyrically and musically, the group drew from age-old sources just as they had on their debut LP. For example, "The Pilgrim's Song" comprises two extracts of poems by the mid-20th century Irish poet Seán Ó Ríordáin – "Oilithreacht Fám Anam" and "A Sheanfhilí, Múinídh Dom Glao", both taken from Eireaball Spideoige (1952). "Fáinleog", meanwhile, uses a traditional lyric extract from Na Laoithe Fiannuidheachta as well as a traditional Irish jig called "The Holly Bush". "Oisín's Song" also used a traditional lyrical motif from Na Laoithe Fiannuidheachta called "The Dialogue of Oisín and Pádraig". "Casadh an tSúgáin" was dedicated to the memory of the traditional Irish musician Mícheál Ó Domhnaill.

The album was recorded in just five days, with pianist Thomas Bartlett producing and Patrick Dillett (assisted by Patrick Phillips) on mixing duties. In an interview, Ó Lionáird said that the music on their second record had been recorded with very few overdubs in favour of a looser and more spacious live approach. Guitarist Dennis Cahill also remarked that a natural feel was sought by the group on this record, and a decision had been made not to "overwork" the compositions by playing them over and over again.

Like their debut, The Gloaming 2 was mastered by UE Nastasi at Sterling Sound. Its album sleeve was designed by Marc Bessant, with the cover art image – entitled 'Flying Lesson' – created by US conceptual photography duo Robert and Shana ParkeHarrison.

== Release and reception ==
The Gloaming 2 was released in February 2016 to positive reviews. It has a score of 84 on Metacritic, indicating "universal acclaim". The album debuted at No.1 on the Irish Album Charts.

Robin Denslow of The Guardian and Eamon Carr of Irish Independent praised the vocals and instrumentation on the album. Siobhán Long of The Irish Times called the album, "a richly textured thing of beauty". The album was included in end-of-year lists of the Irish Independent, The Daily Telegraph and fRoots.

A five-night residency in Dublin’s National Concert Hall was timed to coincide with the release. The group subsequently toured in Europe and North America.

== Track listing ==
Credits are adapted from the album's liner notes. Information in brackets indicates individual tunes featured on a track.

No.	Title	Writer(s)	Length
1.	"The Pilgrim's Song"	Seán Ó Ríordáin; The Gloaming	6:54
2.	"Fáinleog (Wanderer)" (The Wanderer/Fáinleog/The Holly Bush)	Trad. Arr.; The Gloaming	7:15
3.	"The Hare" (The Hare and the Corn)	Trad. Arr.; The Gloaming	3:05
4.	"Oisin's Song"	Trad. Arr.; The Gloaming	6:13
5.	"The Booley House" (The Booley House/Lad O'Beirne's Favourite)	Trad. Arr.; The Gloaming	5:02
6.	"Repeal the Union"	Trad. Arr.; The Gloaming	3:07
7.	"Casadh an tSúgáin"	Trad. Arr.; The Gloaming	5:17
8.	"The Rolling Wave" (The Rolling Wave/Music in the Glen)	Trad. Arr.; The Gloaming	7:16
9.	"Cucanandy" (Páidín Ó Raifeartaigh)	Trad. Arr.; The Gloaming	6:01
10.	"Mrs Dwyer" (Mrs Dwyer/Dick Cosgrove's)	Trad. Arr.; The Gloaming	6:41
11.	"Slán le Máighe"	Aindrias Mac Craith; The Gloaming	8:44
12.	"The Old Favourite"	Trad. Arr.; The Gloaming	4:09
Total length:			1:09:44

== Personnel ==
Music

- Thomas Bartlett – piano
- Dennis Cahill – guitar
- Martin Hayes – fiddle
- Iarla Ó Lionáird – vocals
- Caoimhín Ó Raghallaigh – Hardanger d'Amore

Production

- Thomas Bartlett – production
- Patrick Dillett – mixing, engineering
- Patrick Phillips – assistant engineering
- UE Nastasi – mastering at Sterling Sound
- Marc Bessant – design
- Robert and Shana ParkeHarrison – cover art
- Rich Gilligan – photography
- BARQUE LLC – management

== Accolades ==
Year-end lists
Publication	List	Rank	Ref.
fRoots	Critics Poll 2016	5	
The Daily Telegraph	The best Folk music albums of 2016	18	
Irish Independent	The top 20 albums that defined 2016	12	

Awards
Year	Ceremony	Category	Result
2016	The Irish Times Ticket Awards	Best Traditional Album	Won
2015	Songlines Music Awards	Best Fusion	Won

== Charts ==
Chart (2016)	Peak position
Belgian Albums (Ultratop Flanders)	154
Irish Albums (IRMA)	1
