= Live at the NCH =

Live album by The Gloaming
- Released: 2 March 2018
- Venues: The National Concert Hall, Dublin, Ireland
- Genres: World, Folk, Irish traditional, Celtic contemporary classical, jazz, chamber, post-rock, minimalism
- Length: 1h 4m
- Label: Real World Records
- Producers: Thomas Bartlett & The Gloaming

The Gloaming chronology
2 (2016)	Live at the NCH (2018)	The Gloaming 3 (2019)

Live at the NCH is a live album by the contemporary Irish/American music group The Gloaming. It was released on March 2, 2018 on Real World Records.

The album received widespread critical acclaim upon its release and went to No.3 in the Irish Album Charts.

== Background and recording ==
In February 2018, RTÉ reported that The Gloaming were readying the release of a concert album timed for release with the group's sold-out seven-night residency in Dublin's National Concert Hall in March (their only live dates of that year). The release would act as a celebration of the 17 sold-out shows the band had performed at the NCH over the course of their career to that point (that figure now stands at 24).

In an interview, pianist and producer Thomas Bartlett said of the venue: “After playing our very first show there, we became really bonded to the National Concert Hall. It’s still absolutely amazing to me to have fallen into the situation where such a thing was even possible. I think because the room holds such importance for us as a band, and because the residency has become an annual tradition, we approach these shows with a particular kind of fire and focus, but also in the knowledge that we can really take our time to stretch out and explore, and that the audience will happily go wandering with us.”

Compiled by Bartlett from two years’ worth of concert recordings, the album was produced by Bartlett and The Gloaming, with Patrick Dillett on mixing duties. The live recordings had been originally made by Phil Hayes and Andy Knightley at the National Concert Hall, with the group's live sound mixed by Matt Purcell. Marc Bessant's sleeve design featured photography by Hugh McCabe and Rich Gilligan.

== Release and reception ==
The six-track Live at the NCH was released on March 2, 2018 on Real World Records to widespread critical acclaim. Shortly afterwards, music magazine Hot Press reported that the record had gone straight to No.3 in the Irish Album Charts upon its release.

The Irish Times’ review of Live at the NCH felt the recordings “capture the essence of this band whose live performances are akin to mesmerising, whirling dervishes”. In its five-star review, The Arts Desk called the release “one of the great live recordings, in any genre”, remarking that it was the sound of a band “fusing form and feeling with dazzling improvisations that transform tunes like ‘The Sailor’s Bonnet’ into huge and hugely enthralling explorations”. A five-star review in the Sunday Business Post stated that the album's "six lengthy tracks here encapsulate all that is terrific about The Gloaming”,." while the Sydney Morning Herald, in another five-star write-up, felt the live album would “sustain the wonder and peculiar magic of their first two [studio albums]”.

According to Folk Radio, what was so impressive about this release was “the level of immersive intimacy that the quintet achieves in a live setting”. Similarly, Celtic Sounds noted that the album was “filled with a sense of communication and collaboration, which is, at times, almost transcendental”. Album track 'The Sailor's Bonnet' was also highlighted in the New York Times' Playlist.

In a review of these NCH shows, Irish music source Golden Plec commented that The Gloaming had “taken on a considerable cultural significance”, and that the group's popularity “speaks to the vitality of traditional Irish music as an art form”. “In an era where American sounds and images reign supreme, The Gloaming remind us as a people of our own cultural inheritance.”

== Track listing ==
Credits are adapted from the album's liner notes.

Live at the NCH
No.	Title	Writer(s)	Length
1.	The Booley House	Trad. Arr - The Gloaming	07:49
2.	Cucanandy	Trad. Arr - The Gloaming	10:13
3.	The Sailor's Bonnet	Trad. Arr - The Gloaming	13:27
4.	The Pilgrim's Song	Seán Ó Ríordáin - The Gloaming / Trad. Arr - The Gloaming	07:08
5.	The Rolling Wave	Trad. Arr - The Gloaming	07:50
6.	Fáinleog	Trad. Arr - The Gloaming	18:29
		Total length:	01:04:00

=== Notes ===
The Booley House - The Booley House (hop jig), Lad O’Beirne's Geese in the Bog (reel), Brendan Begley's Slides, The Labyrinth (slide).

Cucanandy - Cucanandy (song), Páidín Ó Raifeartaigh (jig), Mrs Dwyer (hornpipe). Cucanandy is from the singing of Elizabeth “Bess” Cronin (1879 – 1956).

The Sailor's Bonnet - The Sailor's Bonnet, Rolling in the Barrel, The Tap Room, Tom Doherty's (reels).

The Pilgrim's Song - Lyric consisting of two extracts of poems by Seán Ó Riordáin: “Oilithreacht Fám Anam” and “A Sheanfhilí, Múinídh Dom Glao” from Eireaball Spideoige (1952). Published by MOC Music. Music written and arranged by The Gloaming. Incorporates the reel Touch Me if You Dare. Traditional, arranged by The Gloaming.

The Rolling Wave - The Rolling Wave (jig), Music in the Glen (reel).

Fáinleog - The Wanderer (tune), Fáinleog (song), The Holly Bush (jig), Samhradh Samhradh (song). The Wanderer and Fáinleog written and arranged by The Gloaming. Fáinleog uses a traditional lyric extract from “Na Laoithe Fiannuidheachta”. The Holly Bush is a traditional jig, arranged by The Gloaming. Samhradh Samhradh lyrics traditional (author unknown), music traditional, arranged by The Gloaming.

== Personnel ==
Music

- Thomas Bartlett – piano
- Dennis Cahill – guitar
- Martin Hayes – fiddle
- Iarla Ó Lionáird – vocals
- Caoimhín Ó Raghallaigh – Hardanger d'Amore

Production

- Thomas Bartlett & The Gloaming – production
- Patrick Dillett – mixing, engineering
- Matt Purcell – live sound
- Phil Hayes & Andy Knightley – recording at the National Concert Hall, Dublin, Ireland
- UE Nastasi – mastering at Sterling Sound
- Marc Bessant – sleeve design
- Hugh McCabe – photography (cover)
- Richard Gilligan – photography (gatefold)
- BARQUE LLC – management
