= The Gloaming (album) =

Studio album by The Gloaming
- Released: 20 January 2014
- Recorded: August 2012
- Studios: Grouse Lodge, County Westmeath, Ireland
- Genres: World, Folk, Irish traditional, Celtic contemporary classical, jazz, chamber, post-rock, minimalism
- Length: 59:51
- Labels: Real World Records (Rest of World); Brassland (North America); Justin Time Records (Canada); Planet Records (Australia)
- Producers: Thomas Bartlett, The Gloaming (group)

The Gloaming chronology
The Gloaming (2014)	2 (2016)

Professional ratings
Aggregate scores
Source	Rating
Metacritic	77/100
Review scores
Source	Rating
The Arts Desk	5/5 stars
Financial Times	5/5 stars
The Guardian	4/5 stars
The Irish Times	5/5 stars

The Gloaming is the debut studio album by the contemporary Irish/American music group The Gloaming. It was released on January 20, 2014 on Real World Records, and on Brassland Records in America, Justin Time Records in Canada, and Planet Records in Australia.

The album received widespread critical acclaim on its release and is considered one of the finest recordings of 2014. The Gloaming made several end-of-year lists for publications such as the Irish Times (who named it No.1 Best album of 2014), Irish Independent, and NPR, while also being nominated for three BBC Radio 2 Folk Awards, winning Best Traditional Track for "Samhradh Samhradh". It won the Meteor Choice Music Prize for Album of the Year in 2015.

== Background and recording ==
In April 2011, the Irish Times reported that a “supergroup” made up of some of the biggest names in traditional Irish music had met for a collaborative session at Grouse Lodge Studios where material had also been demoed and recorded. A live date at Dublin's National Concert Hall was also billed for August of that year which would sell out before the group had released any music.

Following more highly subscribed live outings in late 2011 and early 2012, the band entered Grouse Lodge Studios for a two-week period in August 2012 to record definitive versions of pieces they had been performing live up to that point, with a view to completing an album. While a couple of tracks had been earmarked for inclusion, there was a degree of flexibility from the band over the ultimate tracklisting. A recording of "Samhradh Samhradh" made during those very first Grouse Lodge sessions in early 2011 was used in the final cut of the record.

As has become a signature of The Gloaming's music, several of the ten tracks that comprise the record consist of traditional material originating decades or even centuries ago that has been arranged by the group using a modern palette. For example, album opener "Song 44" features lyrics adapted by vocalist Iarla Ó Lionáird from original poem No. 44 by poet Domhnall Mac Cárthaigh (Dánta Grádha, An Anthology of Irish Love Poetry 1350-1750). "Saoirse", meanwhile, has lyrics adapted from the 1952 poem of the same name by Seán Ó Ríordáin, (Eireaball Spideoige, Sairseal agus Dill). One track, "Opening Set", includes a series of seven individual traditional tunes within the one composition, one of which, "An Chúil Daigh Ré", is from the singing of Conchúbhar Ó Cochláin, Doire Na Sagart, Ballyvourney, County Cork.

Production duties were carried out by pianist Thomas Bartlett and The Gloaming, while Patrick Dillett (David Byrne, St Vincent) engineered and mixed the record at his studio in New York. It was mastered by UE Nastasi at Sterling Sound. The album sleeve was designed by Marc Bessant, with the cover art image – entitled 'Passage' – created by US conceptual photography duo Robert and Shana ParkeHarrison.

== Release and reception ==
The Gloaming was completed in the summer of 2013 before the band returned to the road for a sell-out tour stopping off at London, Amsterdam, Paris and New York. It was released on January 20, 2014 on Real World Records, and on Brassland Records in America, Justin Time Records in Canada, and Planet Records in Australia.

The album received extremely positive reviews from critics. The Guardian described the record as “exquisite”, while Uncut called the debut collection of songs “a magisterial set”. In their five-star review, the Irish Times said the album was “contemporary music making at its very best: unself-conscious, freewheeling and yet deeply thoughtful, revealing layer upon layer with each listening”. Music magazine Mojo’s verdict was that The Gloaming was “a very organic, modern album. And it's brilliant”, while the Boston Globe noted the record's “energizing tension” and “the pull of the past and the call of what's to come” present in the music. NPR Music, meanwhile, named it "One of the Year's Best Albums" and called it "astonishingly beautiful”.

Following the quintet's sold-out three-night run at Dublin's National Concert Hall in February 2015, their debut album won the Meteor Choice Music Prize for Album of the Year, beating competition from acts such as Hozier, U2, Damien Rice and Sinéad O'Connor. That same year, album track "Samhradh Samhradh" was named Best Traditional Track at the 2015 BBC Radio 2 Folk Awards.

== Use in other media ==
"Allistrum's March" was used in episode four of the first season of British comedy-drama Fleabag.

== Track listing ==
Credits are adapted from the album's liner notes. Information in brackets indicates individual tunes featured on a track.

No.	Title	Writer(s)	Length
1.	"Song 44"	The Gloaming	6:44
2.	"Allistrum's March"	Trad. Arr.; The Gloaming	4:12
3.	"The Necklace of Wrens/An Muince Dreoilíní"	Michael Hartnett; The Gloaming	3:47
4.	"The Girl Who Broke My Heart"	Trad. Arr.; The Gloaming	2:17
5.	"Freedom/Saoirse"	Seán Ó Ríordáin; The Gloaming	5:04
6.	"The Sailor's Bonnet"	Trad. Arr.; The Gloaming	4:15
7.	"The Old Bush"	Trad. Arr.; The Gloaming	7:35
8.	"Opening Set" (An Chúil Daigh Ré, Elizabeth Kelly's Delight, Billy O'Rourke is the Boy, The Millstream, Rolling in the Barrel, The Tap Room, Tom Doherty's Reel)	Trad. Arr.; The Gloaming	16:39
9.	"Hunting The Squirrel"	Trad. Arr.; The Gloaming	3:22
10.	"Samhradh Samhradh"	Trad. Arr.; The Gloaming	5:56
Total length:			59:51

== Personnel ==
Music

- Thomas Bartlett – piano
- Dennis Cahill – guitar
- Martin Hayes – fiddle
- Iarla Ó Lionáird – vocals
- Caoimhín Ó Raghallaigh – Hardanger d'Amore

Production

- Thomas Bartlett – production
- The Gloaming – production
- Patrick Dillett – mixing, engineering
- UE Nastasi – mastering at Sterling Sound
- Marc Bessant – sleeve design
- Robert and Shana ParkeHarrison – cover art
- Hugh McCabe – photography
- BARQUE LLC – management

== Accolades ==
Year-end lists
Publication	List	Rank	Ref.
The Irish Times	The 50 Best Albums of 2014	1	
fRoots	Critics Poll 2014	5	
Songlines	Best Albums 2014	n/a	
NPR	NPR Music's 50 Favourite albums of 2014	n/a	
Irish Independent	Best Irish albums of the year	2	
Deezer	2014: Albums of the year	n/a	

Awards
Year	Ceremony	Category	Result
2015	Choice Music Prize	Album of the Year 2014	Won
2015	BBC Radio 2 Folk Awards	Best Traditional Track ("Samhradh Samhradh")	Won
2015	BBC Radio 2 Folk Awards	Best Original Track ("The Necklace of Wrens")	Nominated
2015	BBC Radio 2 Folk Awards	Best Group	Nominated
2015	Songlines Music Awards	Newcomer	Nominated

== Charts ==
Chart (2014)	Peak position
Irish Albums (IRMA)	4
