= List of number-one albums of 2016 (Ireland) =

The Irish Albums Chart ranks the best-performing albums in Ireland, as compiled by Chart-Track on behalf of the Irish Recorded Music Association.

Issue date	Album	Artist	Reference
7 January	Purpose	Justin Bieber	
14 January	Blackstar	David Bowie	
21 January	Blackstar	David Bowie	
28 January	25	Adele	
4 February	Everything This Way	Walking on Cars	
11 February	Everything This Way	Walking on Cars	
18 February	Everything This Way	Walking on Cars	
25 February	25	Adele	
3 March	2	The Gloaming	
10 March	25	Adele	
17 March	25	Adele	
24 March	25	Adele	
31 March	25	Adele	
7 April	25	Adele	
14 April	25	Adele	
21 April	Cut Loose	Mike Denver	
28 April	Lemonade	Beyoncé	
5 May	Stayin' Up All Night	Nathan Carter	
12 May	A Moon Shaped Pool	Radiohead	
19 May	Lemonade	Beyoncé	
26 May	Dangerous Woman	Ariana Grande	
2 June	Greatest Hits	Bruce Springsteen	
9 June	Lemonade	Beyoncé	
16 June	Lemonade	Beyoncé	
23 June	The Getaway	Red Hot Chili Peppers	
30 June	25	Adele	
7 July	Lemonade	Beyoncé	
14 July	Ellipsis	Biffy Clyro	
21 July	Chaleur Humaine	Christine and the Queens	
28 July	Chaleur Humaine	Christine and the Queens	
4 August	Chaleur Humaine	Christine and the Queens	
11 August	Chaleur Humaine	Christine and the Queens	
18 August	Picture This EP	Picture This	
25 August	At Swim	Lisa Hannigan	
1 September	Glory	Britney Spears	
8 September	We Move	James Vincent McMorrow	
15 September	Skeleton Tree	Nick Cave and the Bad Seeds	
22 September	Skeleton Tree	Nick Cave and the Bad Seeds	
29 September	Illuminate	Shawn Mendes	
6 October	x	Ed Sheeran	
13 October	Revolution Radio	Green Day	
20 October	Walls	Kings of Leon	
27 October	You Want It Darker	Leonard Cohen	
3 November	You Want It Darker	Leonard Cohen	
10 November	The Heavy Entertainment Show	Robbie Williams	
17 November	You Want It Darker	Leonard Cohen	
24 November	Hardwired... to Self-Destruct	Metallica	
1 December	Glory Days	Little Mix	
8 December	Glory Days	Little Mix	
15 December	You Want It Darker	Leonard Cohen	
22 December	You Want It Darker	Leonard Cohen	
29 December	Glory Days	Little Mix	

== Number-one artists ==
Position	Artist	Weeks at No. 1
1	Adele	9
2	Beyoncé	5
2	Leonard Cohen	5
3	Christine and the Queens	4
4	Walking on Cars	3
4	Little Mix	3
5	David Bowie	2
5	Nick Cave and the Bad Seeds	2
6	The Gloaming	1
6	Justin Bieber	1
6	Mike Denver	1
6	Nathan Carter	1
6	Radiohead	1
6	Ariana Grande	1
6	Bruce Springsteen	1
6	Red Hot Chili Peppers	1
6	Biffy Clyro	1
6	Picture This	1
6	Lisa Hannigan	1
6	Britney Spears	1
6	James Vincent McMorrow	1
6	Shawn Mendes	1
6	Ed Sheeran	1
6	Green Day	1
6	Kings of Leon	1
6	Metallica	1

== See also ==
- List of number-one singles of 2016 (Ireland)
