= Drive All Night =

Drive All Night may refer to:

- Drive All Night EP, a 2013 EP by Glen Hansard, or the title track
- Drive All Night, a 1995 album by Jamie Anderson
- "Drive All Night", a song by Bruce Springsteen from The River
- "Drive All Night", a song by Needtobreathe from The Reckoning
