= Phone Power (album) =

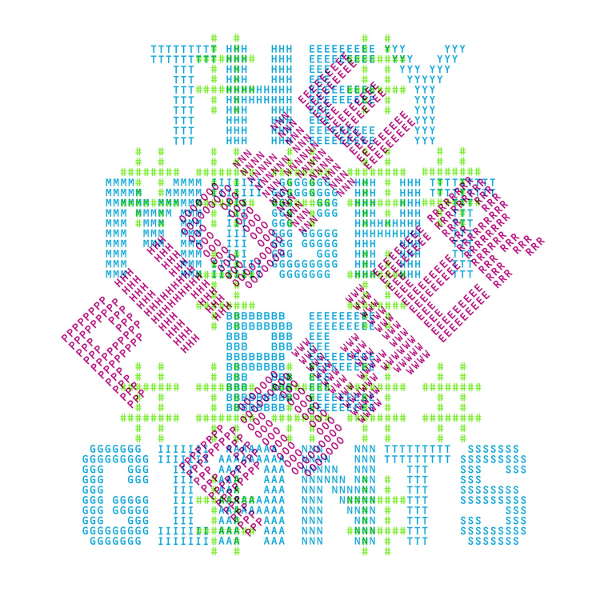

Studio album by They Might Be Giants
- Released: March 8, 2016 (online), June 10, 2016 (CD)
- Recorded: December 2014; April–June and September–December 2015
- Genre: Alternative rock
- Length: 45:05
- Labels: Idlewild, Megaforce, Lojinx
- Producers: They Might Be Giants, Pat Dillett

They Might Be Giants chronology
Why? (2015)	Phone Power (2016)	I Like Fun (2018)

Phone Power is the nineteenth studio album by American alternative rock band They Might Be Giants, released digitally on March 8, 2016. On June 10, it was physically released in Europe on CD.

== Release ==
Phone Power was released digitally on March 8, 2016 for the public, and the first They Might Be Giants release to feature a pay-what-you-want model. This was discontinued on June 10, 2016, switching to a traditional flat payment model. Phone Power is the third and final album containing songs from the band's 2015 Dial-A-Song service.

== Track listing ==
All tracks are written by They Might Be Giants, except as noted.

No.	Title	Length
1.	"Apophenia"	2:33
2.	"I Love You for Psychological Reasons"	3:01
3.	"To a Forest"	2:10
4.	"I Am Alone"	2:29
5.	"Say Nice Things About Detroit"	2:42
6.	"Trouble Awful Devil Evil"	3:29
7.	"ECNALUBMA"	2:56
8.	"Daylight"	1:52
9.	"Sold My Mind to the Kremlin"	2:03
10.	"It Said Something"	3:13
11.	"Impossibly New"	2:07
12.	"I'll Be Haunting You"	2:48
13.	"Got Getting Up So Down"	1:42
14.	"What Did I Do to You?"	1:29
15.	"Shape Shifter"	3:12
16.	"Bills, Bills, Bills" (E. Phillips, K. Briggs, Kandi, B. Knowles, L. Luckett, K. Rowland, L. Roberson)	3:16
17.	"Black Ops (alt. version)"	2:31
18.	"I Wasn't Listening"	1:31
Total length:		44:04

== Personnel ==
They Might Be Giants

- John Flansburgh – vocals, guitars, etc.
- John Linnell – vocals, keyboards, woodwinds, etc.
- Marty Beller – drums, percussion
- Danny Weinkauf – bass
- Dan Miller – guitars

Production

- Pat Dillett – co-producer, mixing
- Jon Altschuler – engineer
- David Groener Jr. – engineer
- Andre Kelman – engineer
- James York – engineer
- UE Nastasi – mastering
- Paul Sahre – design

== Reception ==
Professional ratings
Review scores
Source	Rating
AllMusic	3.5/5.0 stars

Chart (2016)	Peak position
US Billboard 200	122
