= Between Two Shores =

Between Two Shores may refer to:

- Between Two Shores (Vika and Linda album)
- Between Two Shores (Glen Hansard album)
