= Why? (They Might Be Giants album) =

Studio album by They Might Be Giants
- Released: November 27, 2015
- Recorded: 2010 ("And Mom And Kid"); 2014–2015
- Studio: Patrick Dillett's unnamed studio, New York City; Terminus Recording, New York City; The Penalty Box, New York City; Collyer Brothers Studio, Brooklyn; The Governor's Bluff, Sullivan County
- Genre: Alternative rock
- Length: 38:31
- Label: Idlewild, Lojinx
- Producer: They Might Be Giants, Pat Dillett

They Might Be Giants chronology
Glean (2015)	Why? (2015)	Phone Power (2016)

Professional ratings
Review scores
Source	Rating
AllMusic	3.5/5 stars

Why? (stylized as why?) is the fifth children's album and eighteenth overall by American alternative rock band They Might Be Giants, released on November 27, 2015. It is composed largely of releases from the band's 2015 Dial-A-Song project.

== Release ==
Why? was released on November 27, 2015. After several children's albums released through the Disney Sound label in the 2000s, this album was released on the band's own Idlewild Recordings. The Disney-released albums had a theme, such as the alphabet, numbers, and science; this album was intended as a follow-up to the band's first children's album, No!, released in 2002, and therefore had no overarching topic. "Or So I Have Read" was the first single from the album, released in October 2015.

A few of the songs had been released before. "And Mom and Kid" was written for the HBO documentary A Family Is a Family Is a Family: A Rosie O'Donnell Celebration. "Then the Kids Took Over" was written for the HBO documentary Saving My Tomorrow, but was extended and re-recorded for this album.

== Track listing ==
All tracks are written by They Might Be Giants, except as noted.

No.	Title	Writer(s)	Length
1.	"Oh You Did" (with Robin Goldwasser)		2:16
2.	"Omnicorn"		1:47
3.	"I Am Invisible"		2:09
4.	"Definition of Good"		1:59
5.	"And Mom and Kid"		1:20
6.	"I Made a Mess"		2:27
7.	"Moles, Hounds, Bears, Bees and Hares"	They Might Be Giants & Robin Goldwasser	2:17
8.	"Walking My Cat Named Dog"	Norma Tanega	2:12
9.	"Or So I Have Read"		2:14
10.	"Elephants" (with Danny Weinkauf)	Danny Weinkauf	2:38
11.	"Long White Beard" (with Robin Goldwasser)		2:16
12.	"I Just Want to Dance"		1:08
13.	"Thinking Machine"		2:11
14.	"So Crazy for Books"		2:10
15.	"I Haven't Seen You in Forever"		2:12
16.	"Out of a Tree"		2:36
17.	"Hello Mrs. Wheelyke"		2:20
18.	"Then the Kids Took Over"		2:25

== Personnel ==
They Might Be Giants

- John Flansburgh – vocals, guitars, etc.
- John Linnell – vocals, keyboards, woodwinds, etc.
- Marty Beller – drums, percussion
- Danny Weinkauf – bass, vocals on "Elephants"
- Dan Miller – guitars

Additional musicians

- Robin Goldwasser – vocals on "Oh You Did" and "Long White Beard"

Production

- Pat Dillett – co-producer, mixing
- Melissa Jun – design
- Alison Cowles – illustrations
