= The Vitamen =

New York City-based pop rock band

The Vitamen were an unsigned three-piece pop rock band from New York City. The band's three members were frontman Jesse Blockton, bassist Matt Hyams, and drummer Dave Rozner, all of whom attended the same high school in Mamaroneck, New York. Their debut album, Fun, was released in 2002. It was recorded on a four-track machine and, according to Hyams, contains funnier songs than do the band's later albums. The band released their second album, Mujer, in 2003; it was recorded on an eight-track. In December 2004, the band released their third album, Children of the Bear. It was recorded in a house in Cape Cod with the band's producer, Bo Boddie.

== Critical reception ==
In his review of Fun, music critic Robert Christgau described the band as "cynical, sex-seeking (alt) rockers who aren't getting laid enough". Writing for Salon, Doveman described the band as "class purveyors of dork chic", but also described their shtick as "a little limited." He also said that he had "a feeling they’ll never quite equal "Molested"", referring to the first track on Fun.

== Discography ==
- Fun (self-released/J'MOZ Records, 2002)
- Mujer (self-released/J'MOZ Records, 2003)
- Children of the Bear (self-released/J'MOZ Records, 2004)
