= Winning Streak =

Winning Streak may refer to:

- Winning streak, an uninterrupted sequence of success in a game, sport, or other endeavor
- Winning Streak (film), a 2012 Spanish comedy-drama film
- Winning Streak (American game show)
- Winning Streak (Irish game show)
- "Winning Streak" (Brockmire), a 2017 television episode
- "Winning Streak", a 2015 song by Glen Hansard from Didn't He Ramble
- "Winning Streak", a 2015 song by Ashley Monroe from The Blade
