= List of top 10 singles in 2016 (Ireland) =

This is a list of singles that have peaked in the top 10 of the Irish Singles Chart during 2016, as compiled by Chart-Track on behalf of the Irish Recorded Music Association.

== Top-ten singles ==
Key

| Symbol | Meaning |
|---|---|
| ◁ | Indicates single's top 10 entry was also its Irish Singles Chart top 100 debut |

| Artist(s) | Single | Peak | Peak date | Weeks at #1 | Ref. |
|---|---|---|---|---|---|
| One Direction | "History" | 8 | 7 January | - | |
| Sigala featuring Bryn Christopher | "Sweet Lovin'" | 6 | 14 January | - | |
| 99 Souls featuring Destiny's Child and Brandy | "The Girl Is Mine" | 8 | 21 January | - | |
| Shawn Mendes | "Stitches" | 2 | 28 January | - | |
| Major Lazer featuring Nyla and Fuse ODG | "Light It Up" | 5 | 28 January | - | |
| Zayn | "Pillowtalk" ◁ | 1 | 4 February | 2 | |

== See also ==
- 2016 in music
- List of number-one singles of 2016 (Ireland)
