= Scholars (album) =

Studio album by Buke and Gase
- Released: January 18, 2019
- Length: 37:15
- Label: Brassland

Buke and Gase chronology
General Dome (2013)	Scholars (2019)

Singles from Scholars
- 1. "Derby" Released: October 9, 2018

Professional ratings
Aggregate scores
Source	Rating
AnyDecentMusic?	7.3/10
Metacritic	76/100
Review scores
Source	Rating
AllMusic	3.5/5 stars
Exclaim!	8/10
Pitchfork	7.5/10
Sputnikmusic	3.5/5 stars

Scholars is the third studio album by American duo Buke and Gase. It was released on January 18, 2019, through Brassland Records.

== Track listing ==
No.	Title	Length
1.	"Stumbler"	3:26
2.	"Scholars"	4:08
3.	"Derby"	2:30
4.	"Pink Boots"	2:58
5.	"Temporary"	1:15
6.	"Wrong Side"	3:22
7.	"Grips"	4:35
8.	"Qi Ball"	0:52
9.	"Flock"	3:50
10.	"Eternity"	4:37
11.	"No Land"	4:31
12.	"Ranger"	1:11
