= Glean (album) =

2015 studio album by They Might Be Giants

Studio album by They Might Be Giants
- Released: April 21, 2015
- Recorded: Late 2014 – 2015
- Genre: Alternative rock
- Length: 39:14
- Label: Idlewild, Lojinx
- Producer: They Might Be Giants, Pat Dillett

They Might Be Giants chronology
Nanobots (2013)	Glean (2015)	Why? (2015)

Glean is the seventeenth studio album by American alternative rock band They Might Be Giants, released on April 21, 2015. It is composed entirely of releases from the first four months of the band's 2015 Dial-A-Song project.

== Release ==
Glean was released on April 20, 2015 in Europe on Lojinx and April 21 in America on the band's own Idlewild Recordings. CD and vinyl editions were included, along with digital releases of the album, and the original releases of the songs via the Dial-A-Song service.

Australian copies came with a bonus CD of the Flood Live in Australia album, containing the entire Flood album performed live in reverse running order.

== Track listing ==
All tracks are written by They Might Be Giants, except where noted.

No.	Title	Length
1.	"Erase"	2:47
2.	"Good to Be Alive"	3:11
3.	"Underwater Woman"	2:33
4.	"Music Jail, Pt. 1 & 2"	3:10
5.	"Answer"	3:26
6.	"I Can Help the Next in Line"	1:59
7.	"Madam, I Challenge You to a Duel"	1:58
8.	"End of the Rope"	2:35
9.	"All the Lazy Boyfriends"	2:46
10.	"Unpronounceable"	3:23
11.	"Hate the Villanelle"	1:52
12.	"I'm a Coward"	2:49
13.	"Aaa"	1:59
14.	"Let Me Tell You About My Operation" (horn arrangement & horn break composition by Stan Harrison)	2:59
15.	"Glean"	1:47
Total length:		39:14

== Personnel ==
They Might Be Giants

- John Flansburgh – vocals, guitar, etc.
- John Linnell – vocals, keyboard, woodwinds, etc.
- Marty Beller – drums, percussion
- Danny Weinkauf – bass
- Dan Miller – guitar

Additional musicians

- Dan Levine – trombone (3, 4, 14)
- Curt Ramm – trumpet (3, 4, 14)
- Stan Harrison – saxophone (4, 6, 14)
- Rob Moose – violin (4, 6, 9)

Production

- Pat Dillett – co-producer, mixing
- Jon Altschuler – engineer
- UE Nastasi – mastering
- Paul Sahre – design; space and fist illustrations
- Jason Fulford – photography
- Frank H. Netter – salivary glands illustration

== Reception ==
Professional ratings
Review scores
Source	Rating
AllMusic	4/5 stars

Chart (2015)	Peak position
U.S. Billboard 200	67
