= All That Was East Is West of Me Now =

Studio album by Glen Hansard
- Released: 20 October 2023
- Length: 42:17
- Label: Anti-
- Producer: Dave Odlum

Glen Hansard chronology
| This Wild Willing (2019) | All That Was East Is West of Me Now (2023) |

Singles from All That Was East Is West of Me Now
- 1. "The Feast of St. John" Released: 28 July 2023

All That Was East Is West of Me Now is the fifth and final studio album by Irish singer-songwriter Glen Hansard, released on 20 October 2023 through Plateau Records and Anti-. It received positive reviews from critics.

It was the last studio album to be released in his lifetime, before he died in a motorcycle accident, aged 56, on 29 July 2026.

== Background ==
On 28 July 2023, Hansard announced the release of his fifth studio album, along with the first single "The Feast of St. John".

== Critical reception ==
Professional ratings
Aggregate scores
| Source | Rating |
|---|---|
| Metacritic | 79/100 |
Review scores
| Source | Rating |
| Clash | 7/10 |
| Classic Rock | 3/5 stars |
| Mojo | 3/5 stars |
| The Skinny | 3/5 stars |

All That Was East Is West of Me Now received a score of 79 out of 100 on review aggregator Metacritic based on seven critics' reviews, indicating "generally favorable" reception. Mojo felt that "although only nine tracks, it's a sprawling affair revisiting just about every road he's previously travelled, but somehow tying them all together for the first time", while Classic Rock remarked that "the mood varies across the record".

Nick Roseblade of Clash opined that "if you are into classic singer songwriters, this album is for you" and the "songs are well written with glorious instrumentation. Hansard is the owner of, well, a decent pair of pipes and whether he's singing, crooning, bellowing or whispering you feel the emotion in this voice", even if he felt the material is "a bit samey" and "we've heard it all before". Reviewing the album for The Skinny, Alan O'Hare felt that the album "begins as a noisy yet meditative record with crunching guitars and snapping snares, before settling into a more reflective pattern to suit the resigned sighs and stuttering sounds his tunes twist taut upon".

== Track listing ==
All tracks are written by Glen Hansard.

All That Was East Is West of Me Now track listing
| No. | Title | Length |
|---|---|---|
| 1. | "The Feast of St. John" | 4:14 |
| 2. | "Down on Our Knees" | 6:29 |
| 3. | "There's No Mountain" | 4:09 |
| 4. | "Sure as the Rain" | 5:50 |
| 5. | "Between Us There Is Music" | 6:03 |
| 6. | "Ghost" | 4:24 |
| 7. | "Bearing Witness" | 4:29 |
| 8. | "Short Life" | 5:41 |
| 9. | "Reprise" | 0:58 |
| Total length: | | 42:17 |

== Charts ==
Chart performance for All That Was East Is West of Me Now
| Chart (2023) | Peak position |
|---|---|
| Austrian Albums (Ö3 Austria) | 46 |
| Belgian Albums (Ultratop Flanders) | 168 |
| Dutch Albums (Album Top 100) | 59 |
| German Albums (Offizielle Top 100) | 52 |
| UK Americana Albums (Official Charts) | 7 |
| UK Independent Albums (Official Charts) | 42 |
| UK Album Downloads (Official Charts) | 77 |
