= I Like Fun =

Studio album by They Might Be Giants
- Released: January 19, 2018
- Recorded: April 2017
- Studios: Reservoir Studios (Manhattan); The Governor's Bluff (Sullivan County); Collyer Brothers (Brooklyn)
- Genre: Alternative rock
- Length: 40:51
- Label: Idlewild
- Producers: Pat Dillett, They Might Be Giants

They Might Be Giants chronology
Phone Power (2016)	I Like Fun (2018)	My Murdered Remains (2018)

Professional ratings
Aggregate scores
Source	Rating
Metacritic	74/100
Review scores
Source	Rating
AllMusic	3.5/5 stars
Paste	8.9/10

I Like Fun is the twentieth studio album by American alternative rock band They Might Be Giants, released on January 19, 2018.

== Background ==
The band began recording on April 3, 2017 at Reservoir Studios (former site of Skyline Studios), using the same studio space the band used to record Flood. In October 2017, the band confirmed the album was scheduled to be released on January 19, 2018, along with the return of their Dial-A-Song service.

== Release ==
I Like Fun was available for pre-release streaming on January 11, 2018. The album was released physically and digitally on January 19, 2018.

After the release of the full album, as part of Dial-A-Song 2018, They Might Be Giants continued to release videos for all but three of the songs. A music video for the title track "I Like Fun" was created by Canadian artist Joren Cull. A music video for "The Greatest" starring Nick Offerman was released on January 31.

== Track listing ==
All tracks are written by They Might Be Giants, except where noted.

No.	Title	Writer(s)	Length
1.	"Let's Get This Over With"		3:07
2.	"I Left My Body"		2:36
3.	"All Time What"		2:29
4.	"By the Time You Get This"		2:17
5.	"An Insult to the Fact Checkers"		2:34
6.	"Mrs. Bluebeard"		2:43
7.	"I Like Fun"		3:00
8.	"Push Back the Hands"		3:00
9.	"This Microphone"		2:36
10.	"The Bright Side"		2:29
11.	"When the Lights Come On"		3:17
12.	"Lake Monsters"		2:56
13.	"McCafferty's Bib"		2:35
14.	"The Greatest"	They Might Be Giants, Christopher Albert Anderson	1:48
15.	"Last Wave"		3:24
Total length:			40:51

== Personnel ==
Credits adapted from CD liner notes.

They Might Be Giants

- John Linnell – vocals, keyboards, woodwinds, etc.
- John Flansburgh – vocals, guitars, programming, etc.
- Marty Beller – drums, percussion
- Danny Weinkauf – bass guitar
- Dan Miller – guitars

Additional musicians

- Curt Ramm – trumpet (7, 15)
- Chris Anderson – mellotron (14)

Technical

- Pat Dillett – production, mixing
- They Might Be Giants – production
- James Yost – engineer
- UE Nastasi – mastering
- Paul Sahre – design
- Joe Hollier – photography

== Charts ==
Chart (2018)	Peak position
US Billboard 200	108
