= Fool (Joe Jackson album) =

Studio album by Joe Jackson
- Released: 18 January 2019
- Recorded: 2018
- Length: 42:07
- Label: Edel AG
- Producers: Pat Dillett, Joe Jackson

Joe Jackson chronology
Fast Forward (2015)	Fool (2019)	What a Racket! (2023)

Professional ratings
Aggregate scores
Source	Rating
Metacritic	77/100
Review scores
Source	Rating
AllMusic	3.5/5 stars
American Songwriter	4/5 stars
Glide	9/10
Paste	7.6/10

Fool is the 20th studio album by British singer-songwriter Joe Jackson. Recorded the day after the end of his Fast Forward tour at the Tonic Room Studios in Boise, Idaho. Jackson had decided to record the album in whichever city the tour finished, which happened to be Boise after a performance at the Egyptian Theatre. It was released on 18 January 2019 through Edel AG.

== Track listing ==
All songs written, arranged and produced by Joe Jackson.

No.	Title	Length
1.	"Big Black Cloud"	6:01
2.	"Fabulously Absolute"	4:14
3.	"Dave"	5:03
4.	"Strange Land"	5:41
5.	"Friend Better"	4:51
6.	"Fool"	4:59
7.	"32 Kisses"	4:28
8.	"Alchemy"	6:50

== Personnel ==
Musicians

- Joe Jackson – vocals, keyboards, programming
- Graham Maby – bass, vocals
- Teddy Kumpel – guitar, vocals
- Doug Yowell – drums, programming, vocals

Production

- Joe Jackson and Pat Dillett – producer
- Pat Dillett – mixing
- Greg Calbi, Sterling Sound – mastering

== Charts ==
Chart	Peak position
Austrian Albums (Ö3 Austria)	71
Belgian Albums (Ultratop Flanders)	15
Belgian Albums (Ultratop Wallonia)	72
Dutch Albums (Album Top 100)	13
French Albums (SNEP)	107
German Albums (Offizielle Top 100)	11
Scottish Albums (Official Charts)	64
UK Independent Albums (Official Charts)	13
US Independent Albums (Billboard)	7
US Indie Store Album Sales (Billboard)	14
US Top Album Sales (Billboard)	25
