= Alec Hanley Bemis =

American journalist and writer

- Occupations: Writer, journalist, record producer
- Known for: Brassland co-founder

Alec Hanley Bemis is an American writer, journalist and record producer.

== History ==
In 2001, Bemis co-founded Brassland, an independent record label with Aaron Dessner and Bryce Dessner. The Guardian newspaper said Brassland was "the record label at the centre of New York's other music scene" and "a focus for some of the city's most intriguing and creative musicians." Bemis has called every recording artist on the Brassland label a "lifer".

Bemis has served on the board of directors for both WYBC and Manhattan New Music Project, a nonprofit organization that sends musicians to teach in New York City schools. Bemis has emphasized the importance of collaboration in creating music and culture, stating that Brassland was created to "foster the growth of the bands and the community around them."

Prior to co-founding Brassland, Bemis had a career as a writer and journalist working for such publications as LA Weekly, The New York Times, The New Yorker and the Los Angeles Times.

From 2012 to 2016, Bemis hosted a radio show webcast by Alanna Heiss's Clocktower Productions.

== Discography (as Executive Producer) ==
=== Brassland albums ===
- Baby Dayliner - High Heart & Low Estate
- Baby Dayliner - Critics Pass Away
- Buke & Gass - Riposte
- Clogs - Thom's Night Out
- Clogs - Lullaby for Sue
- Clogs - Stick Music
- Clogs - Lantern
- Clogs - Veil Waltz EP
- Clogs - The Creatures in the Garden of Lady Walton
- Clogs - Last Song EP
- Devastations - Devastations
- Devastations - Coal
- Doveman - With My Left Hand I Raise the Dead
- Doveman - Footloose
- Doveman - The Conformist
- Erik Friedlander - Maldoror
- The National - The National
- The National - Sad Songs for Dirty Lovers
- The National - Cherry Tree
- Pela - All In Time EP

=== Cantaloupe Music albums ===
- Alarm Will Sound - Michael Gordon: Van Gogh
- Bang on a Can All-Stars - Brian Eno: Music for Airports (Live)
- Burkina Electric - Paspanga
- Arnold Dreyblatt - Resonant Relations
- Florent Ghys - Baroque Tardif: Soli
- Michael Gordon - [purgatorio] POPOPERA
- Michael Harrison - Revelation: Music in Pure Intonation
- Phil Kline - John the Revelator
- David Lang - Music From the Film (Untitled)
- Lisa Moore - Seven: Music by Don Byron
- Tristan Perich - 1-Bit Music
- Sentieri selvaggi - Plays Gavin Bryars & Philip Glass
- Julia Wolfe - Dark Full Ride: Music in Multiples
