= This Wild Willing =

Studio album by Glen Hansard
- Released: 12 April 2019
- Length: 64:17
- Label: Anti-
- Producer: Glen Hansard

Glen Hansard chronology
Between Two Shores (2018)	This Wild Willing (2019)	All That Was East Is West of Me Now (2023)

Professional ratings
Aggregate scores
Source	Rating
Metacritic	76/100
Review scores
Source	Rating
AllMusic	4/5 stars
Consequence of Sound	C−
Exclaim!	9/10
Sputnikmusic	4.7/5
The Skinny	4/5 stars

This Wild Willing is the fourth studio album by Irish singer-songwriter Glen Hansard. It was released on 12 April 2019, under Anti-.

== Critical reception ==
This Wild Willing was met with "generally favourable" reviews from critics. At Metacritic, which assigns a weighted average rating out of 100 to reviews from mainstream publications, this release received an average score of 76, based on 8 reviews. Aggregator Album of the Year gave the release a 78 out of 100 based on a critical consensus of 6 reviews.

== Track listing ==
This Wild Willing track listing
No.	Title	Length
1.	"I'll Be You, Be Me"	4:23
2.	"Don't Settle"	6:01
3.	"Fool's Game"	6:04
4.	"Race to the Bottom"	6:15
5.	"The Closing Door"	4:27
6.	"Brother's Keeper"	5:07
7.	"Mary"	3:40
8.	"Threading Water"	4:12
9.	"Weight of the World"	7:28
10.	"Who's Gonna Be Your Baby Now"	4:33
11.	"Good Life of Song"	7:36
12.	"Leave a Light"	4:27

== Personnel ==
Musicians

- Glen Hansard – lead vocals, producer
- Breanndán Ó Beaglaoich – accordion
- Joseph Doyle – bass
- Paula Hughes – cello
- Earl Harvin – drums
- Rosie MacKenzie
- Justin Carroll – keyboard
- Rob Bochnik – guitar
- Ruth O'Mahony Brady – piano
- Dunk Murphy – keyboard
- Katie O'Connor – violin
- Nadia Genet – backing vocals
- Maire Saaritsa – backing vocals
- Markéta Irglová – backing vocals
- Mãni Khoshravesh – backing vocals
- Pouyã Khoshravesh – backing vocals
- Nadia Genet – backing vocals
- Una O'Kane – violin
- Michael Buckley – saxophone
- Curtis Fowlkes – trombone
- David Smith – trumpet
- Javier Mas – classical guitar

Production

- Bob Ludwig – mastering
- Dave Odlum – mixing, producer, guitar

== Charts ==
Chart performance for This Wild Willing
Chart (2019)	Peak position
Belgian Albums (Ultratop Flanders)	45
Austrian Albums (Ö3 Austria)	47
Dutch Albums (Album Top 100)	30
Irish Albums (Official Charts)	23
German Albums (Offizielle Top 100)	27
Swiss Albums (Schweizer Hitparade)	27
UK Independent Albums (Official Charts)	38
US Independent Albums (Billboard)	16
