= Didn't He Ramble =

Studio album by Glen Hansard
- Released: 18 September 2015
- Genre: Folk, rock, folk rock, alternative rock, indie folk, indie rock
- Length: 39:20
- Label: Anti-, Epitaph
- Producer: Thomas Bartlett; David Odlum

Glen Hansard chronology
Drive All Night (2013)	Didn't He Ramble (2015)	Between Two Shores (2018)

Didn't He Ramble is the second studio album from Glen Hansard. Epitaph Records alongside ANTI- Records released the album on 18 September 2015. He worked with Thomas Bartlett and David Odlum, in the production of this album. The album was nominated for Best Folk Album at the 58th Annual Grammy Awards.

== Critical reception ==
Professional ratings
Aggregate scores
Source	Rating
Metacritic	79/100
Review scores
Source	Rating
AllMusic	4/5 stars
AbsolutePunk	8.5/10 stars
American Songwriter	4/5 stars
Clash	8/10 stars
Classic Rock	8/10 stars
The Daily Telegraph	4/5 stars
Exclaim!	9/10 stars
PopMatters	7/10 stars
Rolling Stone	3/5 stars
Under the Radar	7/10 stars

Awarding the album four stars at AllMusic, Mark Deming writes, "Didn't He Ramble shows that as a performer and a songwriter, Hansard can create powerful and satisfying work that's up to the standard he set with the Frames, and this is a step up from 2012's impressive but uneven Rhythm and Repose." Hal Horowitz, giving the album four stars from American Songwriter, states, "Production by longtime collaborator Thomas Bartlett and ex-Frames member David Odlum is inviting, alluring and engaging. It pushes Hansard into his finest performances yet on originals that are haunting, poignant and beautifully conceived." Allocating a nine out of ten rating on the album by Exclaim!, Matthew McKean regards, "Didn't He Ramble shimmers, saunters and charms; Hansard has never sounded so good." Rating the album four stars for The Daily Telegraph, Marcus Chilton says, "On Didn't He Ramble, he brings his expressive voice and interesting lyric-writing to traditional-minded Irish ballads such as McCormack's Wall, while Her Mercy uses horns in a stirring soulful way. Paying My Way is a melodic beauty. Class." Grading the album a B− for Consequence of Sound, Janine Schaults criticizes, "While it might not capture his energy, Didn’t He Ramble fully illustrates Hansard’s deep empathy."

Haydon Spenceley, assigning an eight out of ten on the album on behalf of Clash, replies, "He might ramble sometimes, but his ramblings are like the songs of angels." Putting an eight out of ten on the album from Classic Rock Magazine, Jo Kendall describes, "Hansard says of his emotional, spiritual and musical journey to complete this record. He’s succeeded. Ramble on, indeed." Craig Manning, rating the album an eight and a half out of ten for AbsolutePunk, believes, "even in his least effective moments, though, it's impossible to ever doubt Hansard's honesty or conviction, and that level of trust he's earned with his listeners is what makes him one of the best songwriters living." Giving the album a seven out of ten from Under the Radar, Matt Conner explains, "Ramble, perhaps more than any Hansard release, feels intimate and confessional, marked by encounters with grace and mercy and wrapped in lessons of loss and endurance." Alexandra Fletcher, indicating in a seven out of ten review by PopMatters, responds, "He writes beautiful homages to love, and equally ornate eulogies to it, but this record feels less about heartache and more about introspection, patriotism, encouragement and healing—and it works." Signaling in a three star review at Rolling Stone, Jonathan Bernstein recognizes, "Yet as the LP progresses, Hansard too often lapses into his trademark brooding melodrama — an easy fallback for a singer who's at his best, nowadays, when he's trying something new."

== Track listing ==
All tracks are written by Glen Hansard.

Didn't He Ramble track listing
No.	Title	Length
1.	"Grace Beneath the Pines"	3:31
2.	"Wedding Ring"	4:47
3.	"Winning Streak"	3:21
4.	"Her Mercy"	4:46
5.	"McCormack's Wall"	4:39
6.	"Lowly Deserter"	3:02
7.	"Paying My Way"	3:34
8.	"My Little Ruin"	4:26
9.	"Just to Be the One"	3:13
10.	"Stay the Road"	4:01
Total length:		39:20

== Chart performance ==
Chart performance for Didn't He Ramble
Chart (2015)	Peak position
Austrian Albums (Ö3 Austria)	24
Belgian Albums (Ultratop Flanders)	42
Belgian Albums (Ultratop Wallonia)	183
German Albums (Offizielle Top 100)	47
Irish Albums (IRMA)	3
Dutch Albums (Album Top 100)	14
Swiss Albums (Schweizer Hitparade)	31
US Billboard 200	92
US Top Alternative Albums (Billboard)	16
US Americana/Folk Albums (Billboard)	5
US Independent Albums (Billboard)	15
US Top Rock Albums (Billboard)	23
