= What a Racket! =

Studio album by Joe Jackson
- Released: 24 November 2023
- Genre: Music hall
- Length: 41:47
- Label: earMUSIC
- Producers: Joe Jackson; Patrick Dillett

Joe Jackson chronology
Fool (2019)	What a Racket! (2023)	Hope and Fury (2026)

What a Racket!, also known as Mr. Joe Jackson Presents Max Champion in 'What a Racket!', is the 21st studio album by English singer-songwriter and musician Joe Jackson, released by earMUSIC on 24 November 2023.

== Background ==
What a Racket! features Jackson and a 12-piece orchestra performing eleven songs ostensibly written by the fictional music hall performer Max Champion. Champion's fictional backstory states he was born in 1882 in the East End of London and is believed to be a relative of the music hall composer, singer and comedian Harry Champion. After his death on the Western Front in World War I, Champion's songs "faded into obscurity", but some of his sheet music began to resurface from 2014 and by 2019 there were enough songs for Jackson to "resurrect" by recording the album. In a press release, Jackson commented, "These were wonderful songs in their time, but they're surprisingly modern, too. Sometimes it's almost as if Max is speaking, from his London of the early 20th century, directly to us in the early 21st."

Jackson announced the album with the release of its first single, "Health & Safety", on 27 September 2023. A second single, "What a Racket!", was released on 25 October 2023.

In December 2023, Jackson announced "The Two Rounds of Racket Tour" with 20 dates across the United States in June–July 2024. The show will be split into two sections: the first is a solo set by Jackson and the second is based on "The Music of Max Champion", performed by Jackson and a nine-piece band.

== Critical reception ==
Professional ratings
Review scores
Source	Rating
AllMusic	4/5 stars
The Arts Desk	5/5 stars

Upon its release, Graham Fuller of The Arts Desk praised What a Racket! as a "note perfect music hall pastiche with a potent whiff of modernity". He commented on how Jackson's vocals have a "mock-posh tone" and that the "laugh-out-loud songs frequently subvert cultural expectations". He also noted the "galloping drums, snarling or blowsy brass, rousing choral parts, and the choppy strings and frantic piano chords of Victoria melodramas". Jason M. Rubin of The Arts Fuse found "pleasures a-plenty" on the album, with its "very old-fashioned style, cockney vocals, Gilbert & Sullivanesque patter, and backing by a small orchestra". Despite his initial reservations over the style and concept after hearing one of its singles on YouTube, Rubin found "an appreciation of what Jackson has accomplished" through the fact that Max Champion is actually a fictional character. He concluded that the "peculiar but delightful" album "shows Jackson to be flexing brand new musical muscles" with "a set of songs that really feel authentic to the time period they are meant to convey". Stephen Thomas Erlewine of AllMusic described the album as "a joyous, bawdy one filled with barreling pianos, shouted affirmations, careening horns, dirty puns, and boozy singalongs". He added, "Jackson walks the thin line separating satire and tribute, exaggerating his cockney accent and barely disguising his double entendres. His gusto is the reason why What a Racket! is such a delight: it's as audacious in its execution as it is in its conception."

== Track listing ==
All tracks are written by Max Champion.

No.	Title	Length
1.	"(Overture): Why, Why, Why?"	4:37
2.	"The Sporting Life"	4:02
3.	"Dear Old Mum - A London-Irish Lament."	4:28
4.	"Monty Mundy (Is Maltese)!"	3:02
5.	"The Shades of Night."	5:12
6.	"What a Racket!"	2:30
7.	"The Bishop and the Actress."	2:36
8.	"Think of the Show! - A Thespian's Lament."	2:44
9.	"Never So Nice in the Morning"	5:08
10.	"Health & Safety"	3:45
11.	"Worse Things Happen at Sea"	3:51

== Personnel ==
- Max Champion – baritone voice, arrangements
- Albert Bonehill – first violin
- Bessie Macdermott – second violin
- Harry Penrose – viola
- Hetty Leno – violoncello
- Eugene Robey – contrabass
- Jack Chevalier – drums, cymbals, pots, pans, Maltese gong
- Vesta Merson – flute, piccolo
- Dan Fyffe – clarinet, bass clarinet
- Gus Leybourne – trumpet
- George Tilley – trombone
- B. Waldorf – pianoforte

Production

- Joe Jackson – recording supervision
- Patrick Dillett – recording supervision

Other

- David Lawrence – character depiction
- Type Twenty Five – typography, graphic embellishments

== Charts ==
Chart (2023)	Peak position
UK Independent Album Breakers Chart (OCC)	12
