= Between Two Shores (Glen Hansard album) =

Studio album by Glen Hansard
- Released: 19 January 2018
- Length: 42:48
- Label: Anti-
- Producers: Glen Hansard; Dave Odlum

Glen Hansard chronology
Didn't He Ramble (2015)	Between Two Shores (2018)	This Wild Willing (2019)

Between Two Shores is the third studio album by Irish singer-songwriter Glen Hansard. It was released on 19 January 2018 under Anti-.

== Chart performance ==
In Austria it peaked at number 10, number 18 on Belgium's Ultratop Flanders chart, number 185 on Belgium's Ultratop Wallonia chart, number 30 in Netherlands, number 16 in Germany, number 20 in Ireland, number 96 in Italy and number 60 in Scotland. It also peaked on the Billboard charts, debuting on the Top Alternative Albums at number 22, Folk Albums at number 8 and number 42 on the Top Rock Albums.

== Critical reception ==
Professional ratings
Aggregate scores
Source	Rating
Metacritic	68/100
Review scores
Source	Rating
AllMusic	3.5/5 stars
Classic Rock	4/5 stars
Drowned in Sound	8/10
Exclaim!	8/10
The Independent	3/5 stars
Pitchfork	5.7/10
PopMatters	5/10
Slant Magazine	4/5 stars
The Skinny	3/5 stars

Between Two Shores was met with "generally favourable" reviews from critics. At Metacritic, which assigns a weighted average rating out of 100 to reviews from mainstream publications, this release received an average score of 68, based on 12 reviews.

== Track listing ==
Between Two Shores track listing
No.	Title	Length
1.	"Roll on Slow"	3:26
2.	"Why Woman"	3:03
3.	"Wheels on Fire"	4:01
4.	"Wreckless Heart"	4:13
5.	"Movin’ On"	5:15
6.	"Setting Forth"	5:04
7.	"Lucky Man"	4:47
8.	"One of Us Must Lose"	3:28
9.	"Your Heart’s Not in It"	5:03
10.	"Time Will Be the Healer"	4:28

== Personnel ==
Musicians

- Glen Hansard – primary artist, guitar, producer
- Brad Albetta – bass
- Brian Blade – drums
- Dawn Landes – backing vocals
- Graham Hopkins – drums
- Jeff Haynes – percussion
- Justin Carroll – piano
- Joseph Doyle – bass
- Jon Cowherd – piano
- Markéta Irglová – backing vocals
- Michael Buckley – saxophone
- Rob Bochnik – backing vocals, guitar
- Ronan Dooney – trumpet
- Ruth O'Mahony Brady – backing vocals

Production

- Bob Ludwig – mastering
- Dave Odlum – engineer, producer
- Ed McEntee – engineer
- Patrick Dillett – engineer
- Rob Moose – string arrangements
- Thomas Bartlett – photography
- Siobhan Walsh - Album cover photography

== Charts ==
Chart performance for Between Two Shores
Chart (2018)	Peak position
Austrian Albums (Ö3 Austria)	10
Belgian Albums (Ultratop Flanders)	18
Belgian Albums (Ultratop Wallonia)	185
Dutch Albums (Album Top 100)	30
German Albums (Offizielle Top 100)	16
Irish Albums (Official Charts)	20
Italian Albums (FIMI)	96
Scottish Albums (Official Charts)	60
Swiss Albums (Schweizer Hitparade)	19
Spanish Albums (Promusicae)	97
UK Independent Albums (Official Charts)	12
US Top Alternative Albums (Billboard)	22
US Americana/Folk Albums (Billboard)	8
US Top Rock Albums (Billboard)	42
US Top Album Sales (Billboard)	42
US Vinyl Albums (Billboard)	23
US Independent Albums (Billboard)	6
US Indie Store Album Sales (Billboard)	13
