= Caoimhín Ó Raghallaigh =

Irish fiddler (born 1979)

Caoimhín Ó Raghallaigh (born 28 August 1979) is a fiddler, born in Dublin, Ireland, who attended Trinity College Dublin, becoming a scholar in Theoretical Physics (1999) and earning a first-class BA degree (as the top student of his class) in 2001. He is known for developing a drone-based fiddle style heavily influenced by the uilleann pipes and the music of Sliabh Luachra.

Ó Raghallaigh spent several summers working part- and full-time in the Irish Traditional Music Archives in Dublin, opening up a wealth of old recordings which influenced his repertoire and style. Together with uilleann piper Mick O'Brien, he recorded Kitty Lie Over, named no.1 traditional album of 2003 by Earle Hitchner in American newspaper the Irish Echo.

He performs regularly with West Kerry accordion player Brendan Begley, and has collaborated many times with sean-nós singer Iarla Ó Lionáird. He has also performed with the Icelandic group Amiina, and with Sam Amidon, The Waterboys, and others. He is a member of two contemporary traditional music groups: The Gloaming (with Martin Hayes, Iarla Ó Lionáird, Dennis Cahill and Thomas Bartlett); and This Is How We Fly (with Petter Berndalen, Nic Gareiss and Seán Mac Erlaine). He has also worked in theatre, having been commissioned by the Abbey Theatre to write music, and works regularly with Gare St Lazare Players. He contributed music to the 2015 film Brooklyn, a set of reels recorded especially for the purpose with Mayo accordion player Fiachna Ó Mongáin.

As well as playing on violin and Hardanger fiddle, Caoimhín Ó Raghallaigh plays an instrument made by Norwegian luthier Salve Hakedal, a fiddle with five bowed strings and five sympathetic strings, a cross between a Hardanger fiddle and a five-string violin or viola d'amore which he calls a Hardanger d'Amore, first made for American Hardanger fiddle player Dan Trueman, and commissioned by Caoimhín with the head and tailpiece of Salve Hakedal's Viola d’Amore model. Ó Raghallaigh uses crosstunings or scordatura (common in Norwegian and old-time American fiddling), and uses baroque and transitional bows made by Michel Jamonneau. Ó Raghallaigh also used to play a Viola Pellegrina Pomposa by American luthier David Rivinus, a highly asymmetrical five-string viola. Caoimhín also plays tin whistle, flute, and uilleann pipes, having been taught whistle and flute by Co. Clare flute-player Michael Tubridy of The Chieftains and Ceoltóirí Chualann.

In 2011, he premiered The Valley of the Lunatics, a work written for him by Dave Flynn, at the Masters of Tradition Festival in Bantry. Part of this piece is used in the soundtrack to the film The Enigma of Frank Ryan.

In 2019, he and fellow Gloaming member Thomas Bartlett released a special self-titled album of studio collaborations the pair had recorded together during gaps in the group's touring schedule.

== Discography ==
=== Solo ===
- Turas go Tír na nÓg (1999, out of print)
- Where the One-Eyed Man is King (2007)
- Music for an Elliptical Orbit (2014, on Diatribe Records)

=== with Mick O'Brien ===
- Kitty Lie Over (2003)
- Deadly Buzz/Aoibhinn Crónán (2011)

=== with Peadar Ó Riada and Martin Hayes ===
- Triúr sa Draighean (2010)
- Triúr Arís (2012)
- Triúr Omós (2013)

=== with This Is How We Fly ===
- This is How we Fly (2013)
- Foreign Fields (2017)

=== with The Gloaming ===
- The Gloaming (2014)
- The Gloaming 2 (2016)
- Live at the NCH (2018)
- The Gloaming 3 (2019)

=== with Dan Trueman ===
- Laghdú (2014, on IrishMusic.net Records, with Dan Trueman)
- The Fate of Bones (2022, on IrishMusic.net Records, with Dan Trueman)

=== Other collaborations ===
- Comb Your Hair and Curl It (2010, with Mícheál Ó Raghallaigh and Catherine McEvoy)
- A Moment of Madness/Le Gealaigh (2010, with Brendan Begley)
- All Soundings are True (2017, with Garth Knox, on Diatribe Records)
- Caoimhín Ó Raghallaigh and Thomas Bartlett (2019, on Realworld Records, with Thomas Bartlett)
