= Buke and Gase =

American musical duo

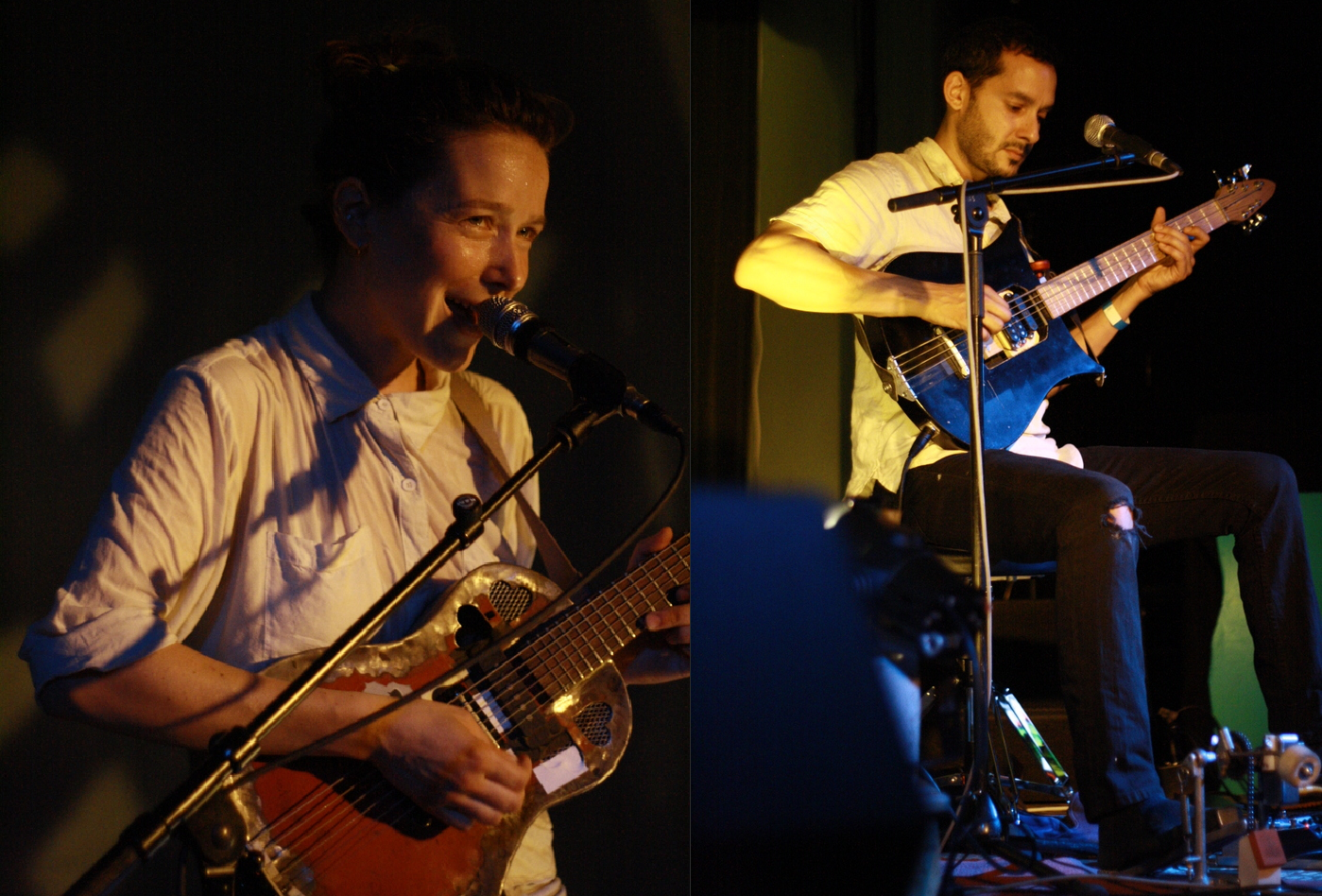
- Buke and Gase performing in Berlin (2015)

Background information
- Origin: Brooklyn, New York, U.S.
- Genres: Indie pop; indie rock; experimental
- Years active: Since 2008
- Labels: Brassland; Altin Village & Mine (Europe); Discorporate (Europe); Hostess (Japan)
- Members: Arone Dyer; Aron Sanchez
- Website: bukeandgase.com

Buke and Gase (formerly spelled Buke and Gass) (/bjuːk/ and /ɡeɪs/) is a New York based musical duo named after the musical instruments invented and built by founders Arone Dyer and Aron Sanchez; the buke is a six-string former-baritone ukulele and the gase is a hybrid guitar-bass.

== History ==
=== 1998: moving to New York ===
Arone Dyer had been writing songs since 1993, performing at coffee houses around her hometown of Willmar, Minnesota. As she was not formally educated in guitar playing, she tuned her Fender Classical acoustic guitar however she liked. In 1998, she competed against other musicians to win an opportunity to open the Lilith Fair in Minneapolis and sell her debut solo album Jump at the merchandise stall. Being just eighteen years-of-age, and graduating public arts high school that year; Dyer called the experience with the Lilith Fair a whirlwind for which she wasn't prepared. Following the Lilith Fair, her performances' intensity brought on debilitating carpal tunnel, forcing her to stop playing guitar.

This threw me into depression and catapulted me to NYC where I thought I'd be able to run away from being a somewhat-successful musician. Like a super smart teenager would think. [Jump] was my Mount Etna as a singer-songwriter. Kaboom! Fizzle and regroup.

Dyer took up work as a luthier and bicycle mechanic, running her own workshop on the Lower East Side for several years.

Meanwhile, Maine native Aron Sanchez grew up tinkering with, modifying and creating musical instruments and ancillaries; these efforts became his job after joining the backing band of the New York based Blue Man Group in 1998, in turn becoming their creative director and musical instrument designer. He established his Polyphonic Workshop and recording studio in the Cobble Hill/Red Hook neighborhood of Brooklyn.

=== 2000–2004: Dyer and Sanchez meet ===
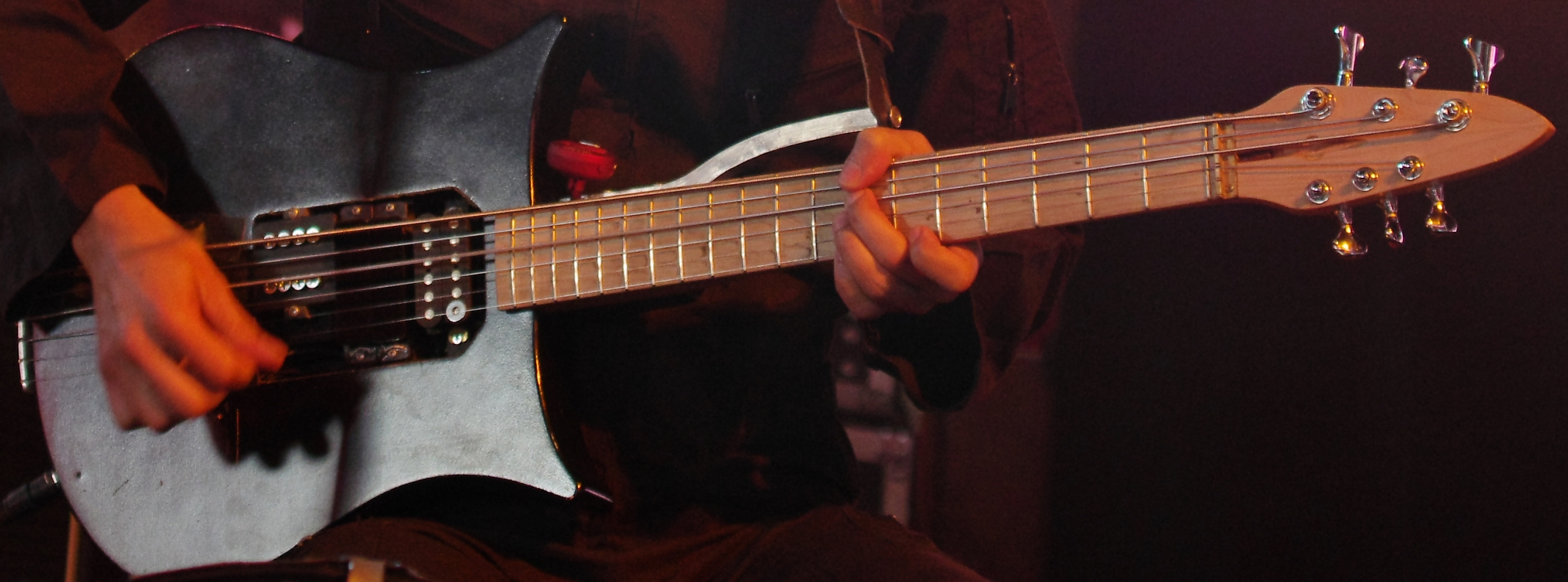
Aron Sanchez with the gase (renamed from gass in 2011) as of 2013 at the Haldern Pop festival

Dyer and Sanchez were introduced in 2000 by mutual music-scene friends because, according to Dyer, they both had the same name, and promptly collaborated on ten songs that Dyer says "have barely, if ever, seen the light of public day". Blue Man Group heard of these collaborations and invited Dyer to provide vocals on their second album The Complex and tour with them through 2003.

Around this time, Sanchez (bass) with Ian Savage (guitars) and Rami Gabay (drums) were working on improvisational music together, and Dyer would make suggestions to the group, eventually being absorbed into it, thereby forming the post-punk noise band Hominid. They released a couple of EPs and were asked to tour with the Fall but Gabay was deported and, although they did find another drummer, Jarrod Ruby, and toured with the Fall, Dyer and Sanchez, who had been dating, broke up, Hominid disbanded and Dyer quit music and distanced herself from the scene.

Sanchez developed the first iteration of an instrument, that became known as the gass (/ɡeɪs/), because of a desire to extend the range of the bass guitar. He added guitar strings, custom-built his own pickups and separated the bass and guitar string outputs to their own custom-built amplifiers. This new instrument was field-tested with Proton Proton, the band next formed by Sanchez with Hominid drummer Ruby and Paul Fuster (vocals, guitar, keys).

=== 2008: formation of Buke and Gass and debut EP +/− ===
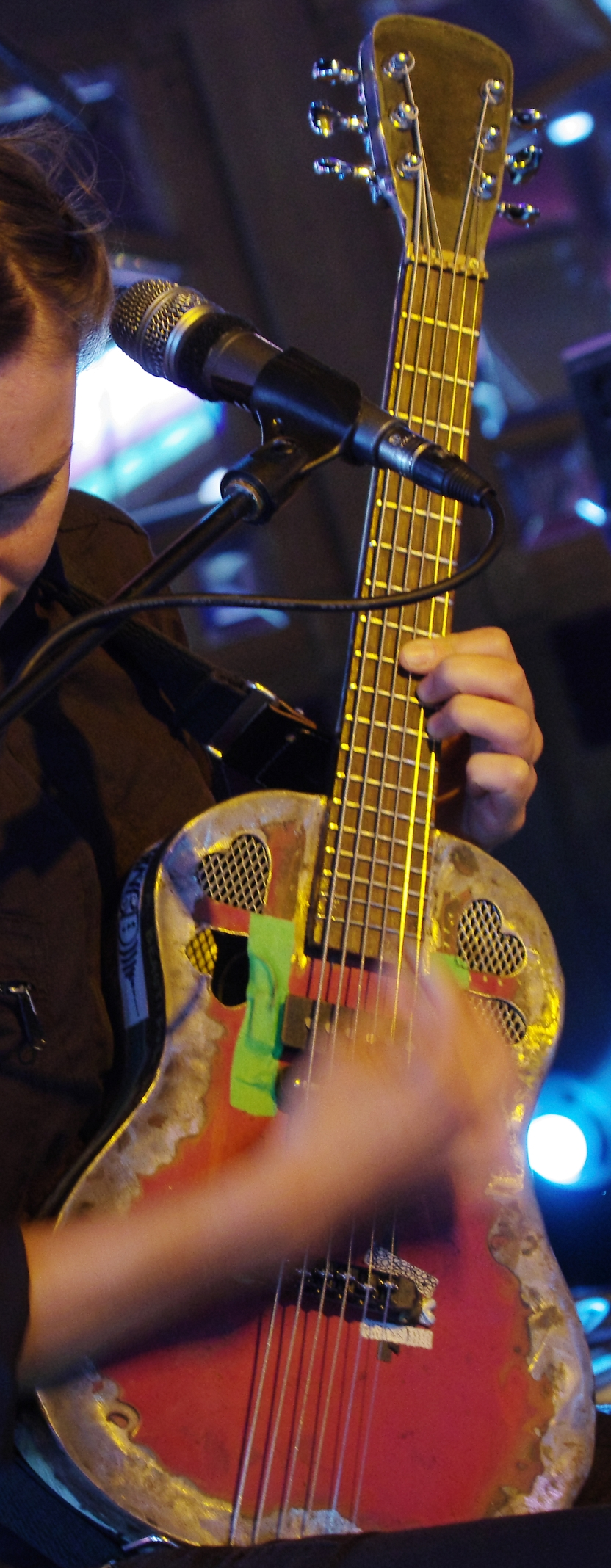
Arone Dyer with the buke as of 2013 at the Haldern Pop festival

Dyer and Sanchez hadn't spoken to each other for around four years, and just as Dyer was considering returning to music creation, Sanchez emailed her, asking how her cycling was going and if she'd be interested in joining the remnants of Sanchez' band as singer and guitarist. As a solution for the carpal tunnel Dyer developed as a teenager, that had kept her from providing guitar in Hominid, and because Dyer felt uninspired by the guitar, an instrument she'd played for so long, they converted a four-string baritone ukulele, which is smaller and lighter than a guitar, requiring less physical strain to play, to a six-string with pickups for amplification; thus the buke (/bjuːk/) was born.

The drummer left shortly after Dyer joined, leaving Dyer and Sanchez with a buke, a gass and a desire to make more noise than one might expect from a duo. They decided to remain a duo for the beneficial economics and creative control and freedom, and for the convenience of performing locally they worked to keep their equipment compact, being able to pack it all in a sedan. To fill the need for percussion, Dyer created the toe-bourine, from tambourine parts and bells attached to a bicycle pedal toe clip and Sanchez made use of a kick drum modified with an attached tambourine.

Speaking with NPR in 2010 and Make in 2012, Sanchez has described how the unique qualities of their instruments have led to creative decisions they might not otherwise have made:

...especially my instrument. It's not tuned like a normal guitar at all so it's both limiting and challenging but also liberating at the same time. I come up with parts I wouldn't normally think of so in that way it's dictating the music a lot.

Additionally the duo custom-built and utilise effects pedals to manipulate the sound of their instruments, but reject the use of prerecorded and live looping, preferring to take full responsibility for the temporal activation of their gear.

Using Sanchez' studio as a rehearsal space, they developed their songwriting process, recording long improvisational sessions, reviewing the content of multiple sessions at a later date, cherry-picking the parts they like and working them together. Dyer writes the lyrics based on elements from within the improvisations, and other influences.

The duo, now named after their buke and gass, recorded their debut EP +/− at Sanchez' studio and independently released it in 2008. Interviewing the duo in 2009, Ken Partridge for The Deli called it "a confounding collection of shifty, unpredictable, unclassifiable indie-rock songs", and Jeff Goodsmith for Elitish said they had combined "sonic landscapes, outstanding vocals, and a 'wait, this was only done by two people?' instrumental complexity [making] a truly unique and exciting listening experience". When Goodsmith asked how they would describe their music, Dyer answered with this "poetic attempt":

it's the exuberant heartbeat of a newly retired schoolhouse janitor (no offense) riding the back of a strong and determined racehorse as it gracefully hurdles through scenes, such as a serene rose-petaled puddle, or a group of surprised topless sun-beat-beach-goers, or a pitchfork and flame-bearing mob blood-hungry for the rabbit who stole all their carrots and cabbage the day before some big holiday. Musically.

=== 2009–2010: signing with Brassland and first album Riposte ===
Jessica Dessner, sister of Brassland Records founders Aaron and Bryce Dessner, discovered Buke and Gass online and emailed them to arrange a show at the Sycamore Bar in Ditmas Park, Brooklyn, mentioning that her brothers were both members of the National. The Dessners attended the show and afterwards invited Dyer and Sanchez to play with them. Sanchez told Laura Snapes for The Guardian in 2011 that they didn't know who the National was, but "in the end, signing with [Brassland] was a pretty easy decision. ...the eclectic mix of people and sounds is cool".

Buke and Gass released their first full-length studio album Riposte in September 2010. Andre Barnes reviewing the album for AllMusic commented that "there's a sense of monotony among the album's 14 songs" due to "the lack of varying instrumentation", but summarized it as "conspicuously quirky and menacing with a dainty undercurrent", noting "its raucous glee". In their review for Pitchfork, Joshua Love commented that "a measurable chunk of [its] middle [blends] together into something ... a little wearying", but "when [they] focus their energy ... the results are positively arresting". They concluded that:

Dyer and Sanchez are the sort of artists who will continue to challenge themselves at every turn. As long as they can keep that boundless creativity from going in a million different directions at once, their listeners will reap plenty of rewards.

Writing of a live performance shortly after the release of Riposte, Ben Ratliff, for The New York Times, called the music, mostly from the album:

fully alert and transferred directly from the catharsis of two people improvising together. ...using sturdy old devices that don't get used enough in pop: melodic lines in contrary motion; additive meter, which breaks up a long pattern of beats into smaller groups; stacked rhythms; stressed upbeats.

In December, Lars Gotrich included Riposte in "NPR Music's 50 Favorite Albums Of 2010", writing that "the duo's huge-sounding prog-punk anthems were written with an effusive sense of joy ... [Riposte] will stomp you with glee". The same month, the duo performed a Tiny Desk Concert at the NPR office. Gotrich then wrote of Riposte that there is "unbridled creativity at play, as the speakers are joyfully pummeled with unexpected delight — exactly the way they are at this Tiny Desk Concert".

=== 2011: renaming as Buke and Gase ===
In December 2011, Brassland announced that Buke and Gass had changed their name to Buke and Gase to address confusion about the pronunciation of Gass. Arone and Aron's statement on the subject was presented in the form of a limerick:

If there was one thing to replace
It would be the last S in Gass,
There isn't much class
When rhymed with sassafras,
So we changed it to E just in case.

=== 2012–2013: Function Falls and General Dome ===
They moved to Hudson and started work on their next full-length album, releasing "Hiccup" in sympathy with the Occupy movement.

For an episode of the WNYC program Radiolab in May 2012, Buke and Gase (among other artists) were asked to provide covers of songs with a color theme. They recorded a cover of "Blue Monday" by New Order, which inspired the creation of their EP Function Falls. This EP saw the introduction of computerised arrangement of their usual improvisations to their creative process.

Function Falls was released and they joined Deerhoof on a US tour before releasing the album General Dome in 2013.

=== 2014–2022 ===
The EP Arone vs. Aron was released in 2017 followed by the album Scholars in 2019. Their "lost album" Dry Daniel was released in 2020, although originally planned for release in 2014. They collaborated with So Percussion for the album A Record Of in 2021 and followed it with another collaboration; the EP Buke and Gase + Rahrah Gabor with rapper Rahrah Gabor was released in 2022.

=== 2023: Buke & Gase film ===
Released in May 2023, Buke & Gase is a film documenting the duo's concert in 2020 "at the height of the Covid-19 pandemic, when tours were cancelled", directed by Steven Pierce, produced by Framework Productions, and performed and recorded in the Basilica Hudson, New York, 2020.

== Discography ==
=== Studio albums ===
- Riposte (2010)
- General Dome (2013)
- Scholars (2019)
- Dry Daniel (2020); recorded 2014
- A Record Of (2021)

=== Extended plays ===
- +/− (2008)
- Function Falls (2012)
- Arone vs. Aron (2017)
- Buke and Gase + Rahrah Gabor (2022)

=== Film ===
- Buke & Gase (2023)

== See also ==
- Experimental musical instrument
- List of experimental musicians
