= Michael O'Raghallaigh =

Mícheál Ó Raghallaigh (sometimes spelled "Mícheál O' Reilly") is an Irish concertina player and recording artist residing in County Meath, Ireland.

He has been a member of the band Providence, along with Paul Doyle (vocals, guitar, and Irish bouzouki), Troy Bannon (Irish flute), Cyril O'Donoghue (vocals, Irish bouzouki, guitar), and Michelle O'Brien (violin). He plays with the Táin & Naomh Pádraig Céilí Bands, and has released two solo albums.

Ó Raghallaigh is the brother of MacDara Ó Raghallaigh, a well-known traditional fiddle player and fellow member of the Naomh Pádraig Céilí Band, along with their sisters Nóra and Áine (also fiddle players). He has also collaborated with Catherine McEvoy and Caoimhín Ó Raghallaigh, as well as accordion player Danny O'Mahony. His most recent recording has been a collaboration with Tim Collins, Pádraig Rynne, Caitlín Nic Gabhann and Edel Fox, entitled ICE (Irish Concertina Ensemble). They released an album in 2015 called Zero.

He has previously taught concertina at the Willie Clancy Summer School, Scoil Éigse at Fleadh Cheoil na hÉireann and at summer music camps throughout the U.S. and Ireland. Fornerly a distributor of R. Morse & Co. concertinas for The Button Box which closed 8n 2022.

== Discography ==
- Providence - Providence - 1999
- Michael O'Raghallaigh - The Nervous Man - 2001
- Providence - A Fig For A Kiss - 2001
- Providence - Providence III - 2005
- Michael O'Raghallaigh - Inside Out - 2008
- Catherine McEvoy, Caoimhín Ó'Raghallaigh, Mícheál Ó'Raghallaigh - Comb Your Hair And Curl It - 2010
- Michael Ó'Raghallaigh & Danny O'Mahony - As it Happened - 2012
- Naomh Pádraig Céilí Band: 3 In A Row All Ireland Champions - 2013
- Irish Concertina Ensemble (Tim Collins, Padraig Rynne, Micheal O'Raghallaigh, Caitlin Nic Gabhann and Edel Fox) - Zero - 2015
