= Rhythm and Repose =

Studio album by Glen Hansard
- Released: 19 June 2012
- Genre: Folk
- Length: 46:43
- Label: Anti-
- Producer: Thomas Bartlett

Glen Hansard chronology
Rhythm and Repose (2012)	Drive All Night (2013)

Rhythm and Repose is the first solo studio album by Glen Hansard. The album was recorded by Patrick Dillett and produced by Thomas Bartlett. The song "Come Away to the Water" was covered by Maroon 5 and Rozzi Crane on the soundtrack for the 2012 film The Hunger Games. The album has sold 77,000 copies in the US as of September 2015.

Professional ratings
Aggregate scores
Source	Rating
Metacritic	68/100
Review scores
Source	Rating
AllMusic	3/5 stars
Under The Gun Review	7/10
The Boston Phoenix	3/4 stars
Consequence of Sound	3.5/5 stars
The A.V. Club	B-

== Track listing ==
All tracks are written by Glen Hansard.

Rhythm and Repose track listing
No.	Title	Length
1.	"You Will Become"	3:48
2.	"Maybe Not Tonight"	5:30
3.	"Talking with the Wolves"	4:43
4.	"High Hope"	3:55
5.	"Bird of Sorrow"	5:50
6.	"The Storm, It's Coming"	3:28
7.	"Love Don't Leave Me Waiting"	4:17
8.	"What Are We Gonna Do"	3:00
9.	"Races"	4:33
10.	"Philander"	3:51
11.	"Song of Good Hope"	3:48
Total length:		46:43

Deluxe edition bonus tracks
No.	Title	Length
12.	"Come Away to the Water"	3:45
13.	"This Gift"	4:48
14.	"Rare Bird"	3:34
Total length:		58:50

== Personnel ==
- Glen Hansard- songwriter, vocals, acoustic guitar, electric guitar (3), rhythm guitar (10), piano (6)
- Thomas Bartlett- piano, keyboards, string arrangements, pump organ (9, 10), drums (1)
- Brad Albetta- bass
- Rob Moose- strings, string arrangements
- Ray Rizzo- drums (2, 4, 5, 7, 9, 10)
- David Mansfield- slide guitar on "Maybe Not Tonight"
- Bryan Devendorf- drums on "Talking with the Wolves"
- Hannah Cohen- backing vocals on "Talking with the Wolves"
- Javier Mas- Spanish guitar on "High Hope" and "Love, Don't Leave Me Waiting"
- Jake Clemons- horns on "High Hope" and "Love, Don't Leave Me Waiting"
- Clark Gayton- horns on "High Hope" and "Love, Don't Leave Me Waiting"
- Curt Ramm- horns on "High Hope" and "Love, Don't Leave Me Waiting"
- Sam Amidon- backing vocals on "High Hope" and "Races", banjo on "Races"
- Cristin Milioti- backing vocals on "You Will Become" and "High Hope"
- Nico Muhly- string arrangements on "The Storm, It's Coming"
- Marketa Irglova- backing vocals on "You Will Become" and "What Are We Gonna Do"
- Aida Shahghasemi- backing vocals on "You Will Become"
- Joanna Christie- backing vocals on "This Gift"

== Chart positions ==
Chart performance for Rhythm and Repose
Chart (2012)	Peak position
Austrian Top 40	21
Belgian Albums Chart (Flanders)	111
Dutch Top 100	37
German Albums Chart	71
Irish Albums Chart	3
Irish Independent Albums Chart	1
Swiss Hitparade Albums Chart	40
UK Indie Chart	15
US Billboard 200	21
US Billboard Alternative Albums	5
US Billboard Digital Albums	19
US Billboard Folk Albums	21
US Billboard Independent Albums	4
US Billboard Rock Albums	8
