= Jamie Anderson (musician) =

American singer, musician

- Born: Tucson, Arizona, United States
- Occupations: Singer, musician, writer
- Years active: 1987–present

Jamie Anderson is an American and Canadian singer-songwriter and multi-instrumentalist from Tucson, Arizona, best known as a performer of women's music. She is based in Ottawa, Ontario.

== Career ==
Since 1987 she has played her original songs in hundreds of venues in four countries including forty-seven US states. Anderson first began touring the U.S. in 1987, and released her debut album in 1989. She was voted Favorite New Performer by Hot Wire in 1990 and 1991, and played many women's music festivals through the decade of the 1990s through today.

Anderson teaches music on line, YouTube, arts centers, festivals, and her studio.

Anderson's memoir, Drive All Night, was published in 2014. Her second book, An Army of Lovers: Women’s Music of the Seventies and Eighties, was published in 2019. Drive All Day: Because I'm Too Old to Drive All Night was published in 2022. She has written book chapters, articles and CD reviews in Acoustic Guitar, Curve, SingOut! and more.

== Personal life ==
She is openly lesbian.

== Discography ==
- Closer to Home (Tsunami Records, 1989)
- Center of Balance (Tsunami, 1992)
- A Family of Friends (Tsunami Records, 1993)
- Bad Hair Day (Tsunami, 1993)
- Never Assume (Tsunami, 1995)
- Drive All Night (Tsunami, 1999)
- Listen (Tsunami, 2002)
- A Promise of Light (Tsunami, 2005)
- Three Bridges (Tsunami, 2007)
- Better Than Chocolate (Tsunami, 2010)
- Dare (Tsunami 2013)
- The Truth Appears (Tsunami 2019)
- Songs from Home (Tsunami 2020)

== Selected works ==
- Drive All Night (Bella 2014)
- An Army of Lovers: Women's Music of the Seventies and Eighties (Bella 2019)
- Drive All Day (Book Baby 2022)
