= Mike Denver =

Irish country singer (born 1980)

- Also known as: The Galway Boy
- Born: Michael Fallon; 15 June 1978 (age 48); Portumna, County Galway, Ireland
- Genre: Country and Irish
- Occupation: Singer
- Instruments: Vocals
- Years active: 2003–present
- Label: Sharpe Music
- Website: themikedenverband.com

Michael Fallon (born 15 June 1980 in Portumna, County Galway), known as Mike Denver, is an Irish country singer.

== Career ==
Starting touring at age 16, he later on met manager Willie Carty who signed him. Denver recorded his first album Wings to Fly in 2003. In 2008, he recorded a song with George Jones titled "The Real Deal". He has released a number of albums. His 2016 album Cut Loose reached No.1 in the Irish album charts. Denver was awarded Entertainer of the Year in 2016.

== Discography ==
=== Albums ===
Studio albums

- Wings to Fly (2003)
- Love to Live (2006)
- Messenger Boy (2007)
- Absent Friends (2008)
- Seasons in the Sun (2008)
- The Galway Boy (2009)
- Got a Funny Feelin' (2009)
- Tradition (2010)
- Thank God for the Radio (2010)
- Cut Loose (2016)
- Workin’ Man (2019)
- The Travelin’ Soldier Album (2024)

Live and special releases

- Christmas Country (2008)
- Mike Denver Live (2008)
- The Essential Galway Boy Collection (2009)
- Vintage Country (2011)
- Mike Denver Live (2012)
- There's Only One Mike Denver (2013)
- Souvenirs (2013)
- So Far So Good (2021)

=== Singles ===
- "Nancy Mulligan"
- "(My Dear Old) Galway Bay" (2020)
