= List of number-one singles of 2016 (Ireland) =

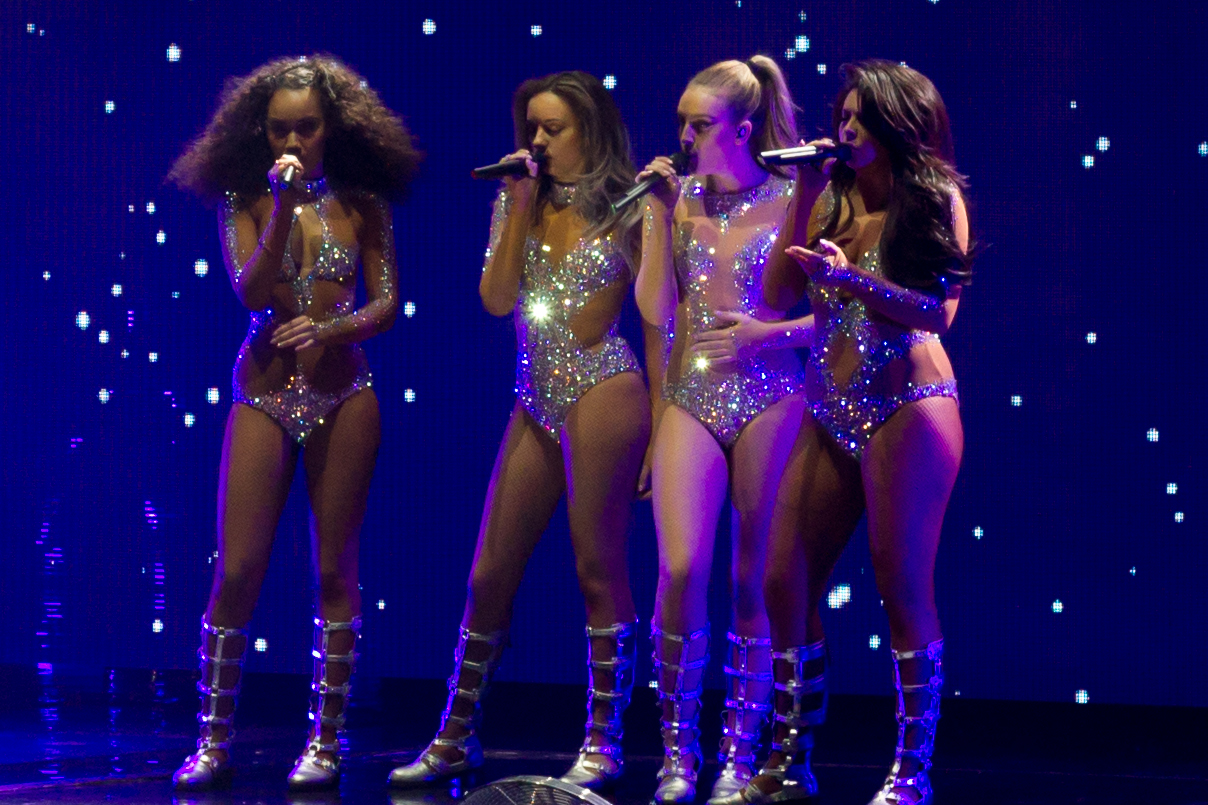
British Girl group Little Mix gained their third number one hit with Shout Out to My Ex.

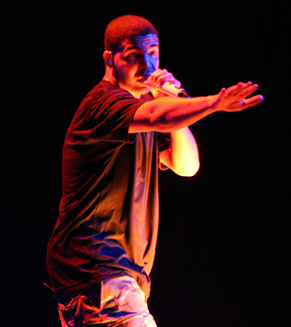
Rapper Drake's first number one hit One Dance spent 12 weeks at number one.

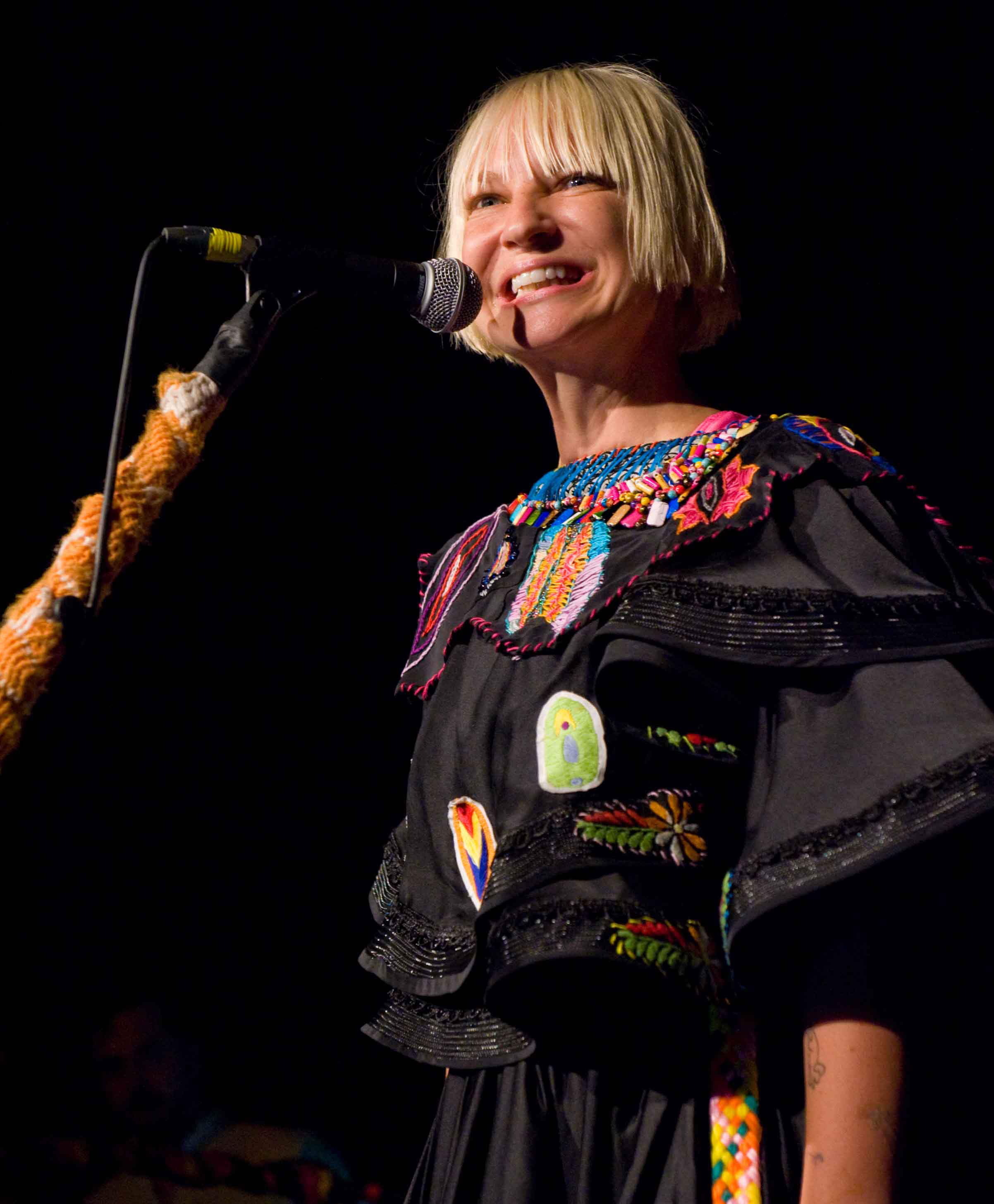
Sia gained her first number one when Cheap Thrills hit the top spot.

The Irish Singles Chart ranks the best-performing singles in Ireland, as compiled by Chart-Track on behalf of the Irish Recorded Music Association.

Issue date	Song	Artist(s)	Reference
7 January	"Love Yourself"	Justin Bieber	
14 January	"Love Yourself"	Justin Bieber	
21 January	"Love Yourself"	Justin Bieber	
28 January	"Love Yourself"	Justin Bieber	
4 February	"Pillowtalk"	Zayn	
11 February	"Pillowtalk"	Zayn	
18 February	"7 Years"	Lukas Graham	
25 February	"7 Years"	Lukas Graham	
3 March	"7 Years"	Lukas Graham	
10 March	"7 Years"	Lukas Graham	
17 March	"7 Years"	Lukas Graham	
24 March	"I Took a Pill in Ibiza"	Mike Posner	
31 March	"Cheap Thrills"	Sia featuring Sean Paul	
7 April	"Cheap Thrills"	Sia featuring Sean Paul	
14 April	"Cheap Thrills"	Sia featuring Sean Paul	
21 April	"Cheap Thrills"	Sia featuring Sean Paul	
28 April	"Cheap Thrills"	Sia featuring Sean Paul	
5 May	"One Dance"	Drake featuring Wizkid and Kyla	
12 May	"This Is What You Came For"	Calvin Harris featuring Rihanna	
19 May	"One Dance"	Drake featuring Wizkid and Kyla	
26 May	"One Dance"	Drake featuring Wizkid and Kyla	
2 June	"One Dance"	Drake featuring Wizkid and Kyla	
9 June	"One Dance"	Drake featuring Wizkid and Kyla	
16 June	"One Dance"	Drake featuring Wizkid and Kyla	
23 June	"One Dance"	Drake featuring Wizkid and Kyla	
30 June	"One Dance"	Drake featuring Wizkid and Kyla	
7 July	"One Dance"	Drake featuring Wizkid and Kyla	
14 July	"One Dance"	Drake featuring Wizkid and Kyla	
21 July	"One Dance"	Drake featuring Wizkid and Kyla	
28 July	"Cold Water"	Major Lazer featuring Justin Bieber and MØ	
4 August	"Cold Water"	Major Lazer featuring Justin Bieber and MØ	
11 August	"Cold Water"	Major Lazer featuring Justin Bieber and MØ	
18 August	"Cold Water"	Major Lazer featuring Justin Bieber and MØ	
25 August	"Cold Water"	Major Lazer featuring Justin Bieber and MØ	
1 September	"Closer"	The Chainsmokers featuring Halsey	
8 September	"Closer"	The Chainsmokers featuring Halsey	
15 September	"Closer"	The Chainsmokers featuring Halsey	
22 September	"Closer"	The Chainsmokers featuring Halsey	
29 September	"Closer"	The Chainsmokers featuring Halsey	
6 October	"Closer"	The Chainsmokers featuring Halsey	
13 October	"Say You Won't Let Go"	James Arthur	
20 October	"Say You Won't Let Go"	James Arthur	
27 October	"Shout Out to My Ex"	Little Mix	
3 November	"Say You Won't Let Go"	James Arthur	
10 November	"Say You Won't Let Go"	James Arthur	
17 November	"Rockabye"	Clean Bandit featuring Sean Paul and Anne-Marie	
24 November	"Rockabye"	Clean Bandit featuring Sean Paul and Anne-Marie	
1 December	"Rockabye"	Clean Bandit featuring Sean Paul and Anne-Marie	
8 December	"Rockabye"	Clean Bandit featuring Sean Paul and Anne-Marie	
15 December	"Rockabye"	Clean Bandit featuring Sean Paul and Anne-Marie	
22 December	"Rockabye"	Clean Bandit featuring Sean Paul and Anne-Marie	
29 December	"Rockabye"	Clean Bandit featuring Sean Paul and Anne-Marie	

== Number-one artists ==
Position	Artist	Weeks at No. 1
1	Sean Paul	12
2	Drake	11
2	WizKid	11
2	Kyla	11
5	Justin Bieber	9
6	Clean Bandit	7
6	Anne-Marie	7
8	The Chainsmokers	6
8	Halsey	6
10	Lukas Graham	5
10	Sia	5
10	Major Lazer	5
10	MØ	5
14	James Arthur	4
15	Zayn	2
16	Mike Posner	1
16	Calvin Harris	1
16	Rihanna	1
16	Little Mix	1

== See also ==
- List of number-one albums of 2016 (Ireland)
