= Drive All Night (EP) =

EP by Glen Hansard
- Released: 2013
- Genre: Rock
- Length: 19:58
- Label: Epitaph

Glen Hansard chronology
Rhythm and Repose (2012)	Drive All Night (2013)	It Was Triumph We Once Proposed...Songs of Jason Molina (2015)

Professional ratings
Aggregate scores
Source	Rating
Metacritic	68/100
Review scores
Source	Rating
AllMusic	3/5 stars
Consequence of Sound	3.5/5 stars

Drive All Night is an EP by Irish musician Glen Hansard. It was released in December 2013 under Epitaph Records. The title track is a cover of a Bruce Springsteen song, a non-single album track from his 1980 album The River. Besides guest vocals from Pearl Jam frontman Eddie Vedder, the song also features Jake Clemons, current member of the E Street Band.

== Track listing ==
Drive All Night track listing
No.	Title	Length
1.	"Drive All Night" (featuring Jay Bellerose, Jake Clemons, Greg Leisz, Eddie Vedder, Patrick Warren and David Piltch)	8:36
2.	"Pennies in the Fountain" (featuring Brad Albetta, Thomas Bartlett and Ray Rizzo)	4:55
3.	"Renata" (featuring Brad Albetta, Thomas Bartlett, Hannah Cohen, Markéta Irglová, Dawn Landes, Rob Moose and Ray Rizzo)	4:13
4.	"Step Out of the Shadows"	2:14
