= The Gloaming =

Irish/American music supergroup

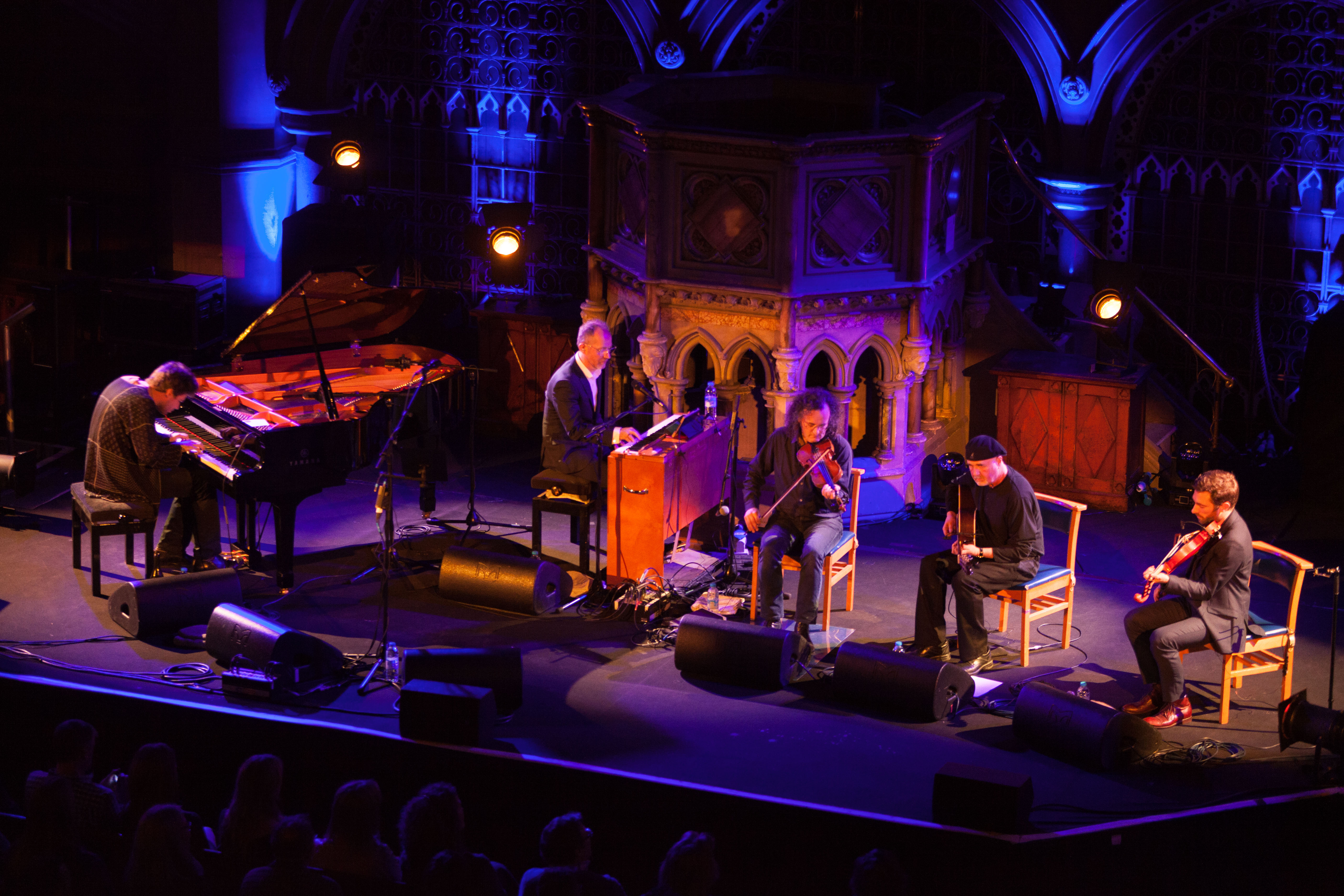

Background information
- Origin: Ireland, United States
- Genres: Traditional Irish, Celtic, world music, contemporary classical, jazz, chamber, folk, post-rock, minimalism
- Years active: 2011–present
- Labels: Real World Records (Rest of World); Brassland Records (North America)
- Members: Martin Hayes; Iarla Ó Lionáird; Caoimhín Ó Raghallaigh; Thomas Bartlett
- Past members: Dennis Cahill
- Website: http://www.thegloaming.net/home

The Gloaming is a contemporary Irish/American music supergroup. Its members are fiddle player Martin Hayes, sean-nós singer Iarla Ó Lionáird, hardanger fiddle player Caoimhín Ó Raghallaigh, and pianist Thomas Bartlett. Guitarist Dennis Cahill was a member until his death in June 2022.

The group was formed in 2011 and began a first tour of Ireland with a sold out performance in the National Concert Hall (NCH). Since then they have played the NCH annually, increasing to a residency of seven consecutive nights by 2017. After the release of their third studio album and a concert tour in 2019, the band announced that it would "take a break" in 2020.

They have recorded three studio albums, The Gloaming (2014), The Gloaming 2 (2016), The Gloaming 3 (2019), and a concert recording, Live at the NCH (2018). Thomas Bartlett, the band's pianist, produced all four albums. The first was recorded at Grouse Lodge in County Westmeath in Ireland and the second at Real World Studios near Bath, England. The Gloaming 3 was produced at Bartlett's studio in New York. Unlike the first two studio albums, which were recorded after rehearsals or during tours, The Gloaming 3 contains music that the group had not played live together, with Bartlett taking a more active role as producer. Live at the NCH contains 6 songs chosen by Bartlett from live recordings of several of the group's National Concert Hall shows.

A feature of the band's music is the adaptation of Irish language poetry into song. They have adapted works by twentieth-century poets Michael Hartnett, Seán Ó Ríordáin, and Liam Ó Muirthile, as well as eighteenth-century poet Aindrias Mac Craith and seventeenth-century poet Eoghan Ruadh Mac an Bhaird.

The Gloaming won the Meteor Choice Music Prize for 2014 Irish Album of the Year for their first album. They won the 2015 BBC Radio 2 Folk Award for Best Traditional Track, for Samhradh Samhradh, which appeared on the first album. In 2019 they were nominated for three RTÉ Radio 1 Folk Awards: Best Original Folk Track, Best Folk Group and Best Folk Album. Caoimhin Ó Raghallaigh was nominated for Best Folk Instrumentalist. Iarla Ó Lionáird won the Best Folk Singer award.
