= Brassland Records =

Brassland
- Founded: 2001
- Founder: Alec Hanley Bemis, Aaron Dessner, Bryce Dessner
- Distributors: Current: ADA, The Orchard, PIAS, SEED — Former: Southern, Hostess Entertainment
- Genre: Rock, pop, art pop
- Country of origin: U.S.
- Location: Brooklyn, New York City
- Official website: brassland.org

Brassland is an independent record label founded in 2001 by Alec Hanley Bemis, Aaron Dessner, and Bryce Dessner.

== History ==
In Brassland's early years, Bemis worked as a freelance journalist for LA Weekly and The New York Times. The Dessners are twin brothers who are also musicians. Aaron is a producer and songwriter, while Bryce is a guitarist, composer, and curator. Both are songwriters for The National, while Bryce is equally known for his collaborations with Sufjan Stevens and Bang on a Can All Stars. Brassland is based in Brooklyn, New York. The label has close ties to Ohio, where the Dessner brothers were raised. All five members of The National are from Cincinnati, Ohio.

The label's first two releases were debut albums by The National and Clogs. Brassland has also released albums by Thomas Bartlett aka Doveman, Jherek Bischoff, Buke and Gase, This Is The Kit, and Baby Dayliner — and licensed music by Nico Muhly and The Gloaming. The label considers itself an intentional community, making collective A&R decisions based on the tastes of both its founders and the interests of the artists involved in the label, actively encouraging collaboration and a sense of community among its roster. "Art is a way of life," Dessner has been quoted as saying. "We don't think in isolation, we exist in a community with each other."

In a 2015 profile in the Irish Times, Bemis said, "We give bands and musicians a level of infrastructure, but without putting on the pressure that if they don't sell 20,000 records they're going to be out of luck. That said, it's probably more of a corporate experience than they had before we found them. But Brassland is not trying to become a major label. It's as much about interaction between the different musicians as it is about whatever audience will be for them." For example, founding Clogs member Padma Newsome contributed regularly to The National's music after the band signed to Beggars Banquet; onetime label artist Erik Friedlander performed on Clogs' "Stick Music" while Pela included a guitarist, Nate Martinez, who frequently acted as a substitute guitarist during The National's earliest years. Thomas Bartlett has worked as a player and producer with Muhly, Sufjan Stevens, and The National.

On its 10th anniversary, The Guardian called Brassland "the centre of New York's other music scene." Pitchfork called it a "venerable art-pop boutique label."

== Current artists ==
- Baby Dayliner
- Bartees Strange
- Briars of North America
- Buke and Gase
- DN RES
- Fusilier
- Hannah Georgas
- isomonstrosity (group featuring Johan Lenox, Ellen_Reid_(composer), and Yuga Cohler)
- LANZ (aka Benjamin Lanz)
- Las Palabras
- So Percussion

== Inactive artists ==
- Clogs
- Devastations
- Doveman
- The Gloaming
- Pela
- People Get Ready
- The Perennials

== Artists previously on the label ==
- Jherek Bischoff
- Erik Friedlander
- The National
- Nico Muhly
- This Is The Kit

== See also ==
- List of record labels

== External links (label) ==
- Official site
- Interview with Aaron Dessner
