= Robert and Shana ParkeHarrison =

American photographer

Robert ParkeHarrison
- Born: 1968 (age 57–58); Fort Leonard Wood, Missouri
- Occupations: Photographer, artist
- Spouse: Shana ParkeHarrison
- Website: parkeharrison.com

Robert and Shana ParkeHarrison (born 1968) are American photographers, best known for their work in the area of fine art photography.

Robert and Shana ParkeHarrison are a husband and wife duo who are based in Missouri. They have been making photographs together for almost 20 years. Their work focuses on the relationship between humans and the environment—an idea that has only recently come to popularity with movements like the Go Green initiative and concepts like the carbon footprint. Using photogravure, collage, and painting techniques, the ParkeHarrisons create cinematic environments that explore how we interact with our natural surroundings.

The ParkeHarrisons' work can be found in over 20 prestigious museum collections, and their book The Architect's Brother was named one of the ten best photography books by the New York Times in 2000. Recently the couple has begun working in sculpture—large dramatic pieces that complement the dreamy qualities of their photogravures.

The photographs of Robert and Shana ParkeHarrison have been displayed in 18 solo exhibitions and over 30 group shows worldwide. Their work can also be found in over 20 collections, including the National Museum of American Art at the Smithsonian Institution and the George Eastman House.

Their book, The Architect's Brother, was named as one of 'the Ten Best Photography Books of the Year' of 2000 by The New York Times.

My photographs tell stories of loss, human struggle, and personal exploration within landscapes scarred by technology and over-use…. [I] strive to metaphorically and poetically link laborious actions, idiosyncratic rituals and strangely crude machines into tales about our modern experience. —Robert ParkeHarrison

Many of his images are of Robert himself, in costume and interacting with specific scenes, objects, and landscapes. Due to this aspect of performance in the images, they can be viewed as both standalone photographs and a still of performance art.

ParkeHarrison's work is stylistically similar to that of Teun Hocks.
