= Martin Hayes (musician) =

Irish fiddler from County Clare (born 1962)

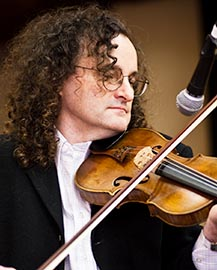
- Hayes in 2008

Background information
- Born: 4 July 1962 (age 64)
- Origin: County Clare, Ireland
- Genre: Traditional Irish
- Instrument: Fiddle
- Years active: 1980s–present
- Labels: Green Linnet, Real World
- Website: www.martinhayes.com
- Parents: P. J. Hayes; Peggy Hayes

Martin Hayes (born 4 July 1962) is an Irish fiddler from County Clare. He is a member of the Irish-American supergroup The Gloaming.

== Family and early life ==
Hayes was born into a musical family in Maghera, a townland in the parish of Killanena in East County Clare, Ireland. His father, P.J. Hayes, was a noted fiddle player and his grandmother played the concertina. His father and his uncle Paddy Canny, also an influential fiddler, were among the founders of the Tulla Céilí Band in 1946. P.J. Hayes led the band from 1952 until shortly before his death in 2001.

Martin Hayes started playing the fiddle at the age of seven, taught by his father. At 13 he won his first of six All-Ireland Fiddle Competitions. He is one of only three fiddlers ever to be named All-Ireland Fiddle Champion in the senior division in two consecutive years (1981 and 1982). He joined the Tulla Céilí Band as a teenager and played in the band for seven years.

== Career ==
=== 1985 to 1995 ===
Hayes moved to Chicago in 1985 and became active in the Irish traditional music scene there. He was a regular performer at weekly Irish traditional music sessions along with Chicago fiddler Liz Carroll, who later described him as belonging to "that very narrow set of performers from any musical genre – not just Irish – whose every note is perfect". To make a living he worked in bars playing in a variety of genres including "rebel music, and songs and stage Irish humor in clubs, and all kinds of things". In the late 1980s he led a band called the "Celtic Aires". In 1989 he and the Chicago guitarist Dennis Cahill formed "Midnight Court", which combined traditional Irish and rock music. The band was active until 1992. In 1993 Hayes moved to Seattle, where he lived until 2005.

His solo recording career began in 1993, with an eponymous debut album recorded with Randal Bays on guitar. On his second recording, Under the Moon (1995), he was accompanied by Bays on guitar and fiddle and guitarist Steve Cooney, as well as his father P.J. Hayes on fiddle and John Williams on concertina and accordion.

=== 1996 to the present ===
In 1996 Hayes formed an acoustic duo with Dennis Cahill, developing an "unrushed, lyrical, highly expressive interpretation" of traditional Irish music. In 1999 a New York Times reviewer described Hayes and Cahill's approach as "stripping old reels and jigs to their essence, leaving space between the notes for harmonics and whispered blue notes," resulting in "a Celtic complement to Steve Reich's quartets or Miles Davis's Sketches of Spain. " Hayes and Cahill have released three recordings on the Green Linnet label: The Lonesome Touch (1997), Live in Seattle (1999), and Welcome Here Again (2008).

Hayes and Cahill, along with singer Iarla Ó Lionáird, fiddler Caoimhín Ó Raghallaigh and pianist Doveman, were the members of The Gloaming, an Irish-American supergroup whose first album was released in 2014, winning the Meteor Choice Music Prize for Irish album of the year.

Hayes performs and records with Peadar Ó Riada and Caoimhín Ó Raghallaigh as the group "Tríur" and has toured with Kevin Crawford and guitarist, John Doyle, as The Teetotalers.

Hayes was a member of the Martin Hayes Quartet, with Dennis Cahill, Liz Knowles, and Doug Wieselman.

He has also appeared on a number of recordings with other musicians from east Clare including Christy McNamara's CD The House I was Reared In, Mary MacNamara's CD Traditional Music from East Clare and the Compilation CD Reeling Through the Years celebrating 20 years of music from the Feakle Festival.

Hayes plays regularly with The Tulla Céilí Band, of which his late father was a founding member. Since 2003 Hayes has been the musical director of the Masters of Tradition festival, held in Bantry House (Bantry, County Cork) every summer.

Since 2019 he has performed with the Common Ground Ensemble, a specially formed group including Cormac McCarthy on piano, Kate Ellis (of Crash Ensemble) on cello, Kyle Sanna (of Brooklyn Rider) on guitar, and Brian Donnellan (of The Tulla Céilí Band) on bouzouki, harmonium and concertina. In 2023 they released the album, Peggy's Dream.

== Honours ==
Hayes won the BBC Radio 2 Folk Awards 2000 award for Instrumentalist of the Year. In 2008 he was awarded the TG4 Gradam Ceoil (Traditional musician of the year award). In November 2019 he was awarded an honorary doctorate by National University of Ireland Galway.

== Discography ==
With P. J. Hayes

- The Shores of Lough Graney (1990, Ice Nine Productions ICE 003 Cassette; re-released in 2011 on Quillan Records CD 001)

Martin Hayes albums

- Martin Hayes (1992, Green Linnet #1127)
- Under the Moon (1995, Green Linnet #1155)

Martin Hayes & Dennis Cahill albums

- The Lonesome Touch (1997, Green Linnet #1127)
- Live in Seattle (1999, Green Linnet #1195)
- Welcome Here Again (2008, Green Linnet #1233)

Martin Hayes Quartet

- The Blue Room (2017)

Martin Hayes & The Common Ground Ensemble

- Peggy's Dream (2023, Faction Records)

As a member of the Tulla Céilí Band

- A Celebration of 50 Years (1996, Green Linnet)
- 60th Anniversary Celebration (2007)

With The Gloaming

- The Gloaming (2014, Brassland Records / Real World Records)
- 2 (2016)
- Live at the NCH (2018)
- 3 (2019)

Other

- My Love is in America The Boston College Fiddle Festival (1991, Green Linnet Records #1110)
- Traditional Music from East Clare by Mary MacNamara (1994, Claddagh Records)
- John Williams by John Williams (1995, Green Linnet #1157)
- The Gathering Various Artists (1997, Real World UKCDRW62)
- Celtic Sessions by William Coulter and Friends (1997, Gourd Music)
- In Concert by Kevin Burke (1999, Green Linnet #1196)
- Diary of a Fiddler by Darol Anger 1999
- Poor Man's Troubles by Bruce Molsky (2000, Rounder)
- I Could Read the Sky by Iarla Ó Lionáird (2000, Real World Records)
- Murphy's Irish Pub with Laura MacKenzie, John Williams and Dean Magraw (2005, Compass Productions)
- The Wildlife Album (2005 Market Square Records Cat No. MSMCD134)
- Sligo Live 06 (2006 Sligo Live Sampler, Promotional Use Only)
- The House I Was Reared In by Christy McNamara (2007, Durra Records)
- Reeling Through The Years (2007) compilation CD celebrating 20 years of the Feakle Festival
- Today, Tomorrow & on Sunday (2008) by Helen Hayes (CDHHG 001)
- The Humours of Tulla (2009) by The Tulla Comhaltas Archive Collection
- Triúr Sa Draighean (2010) with Peadar Ó Riada and Caoimhín Ó Raghallaigh
- Triúr Arís (2012) with Peadar Ó Riada and Caoimhín Ó Raghallaigh
- Highlander's Farewell (2011) with Alasdair Fraser, Natalie Haas, and Bruce Molsky
- The Butterfly (2019) with Brooklyn Rider
