= Dennis Cahill (musician) =

American guitarist (1954–2022)

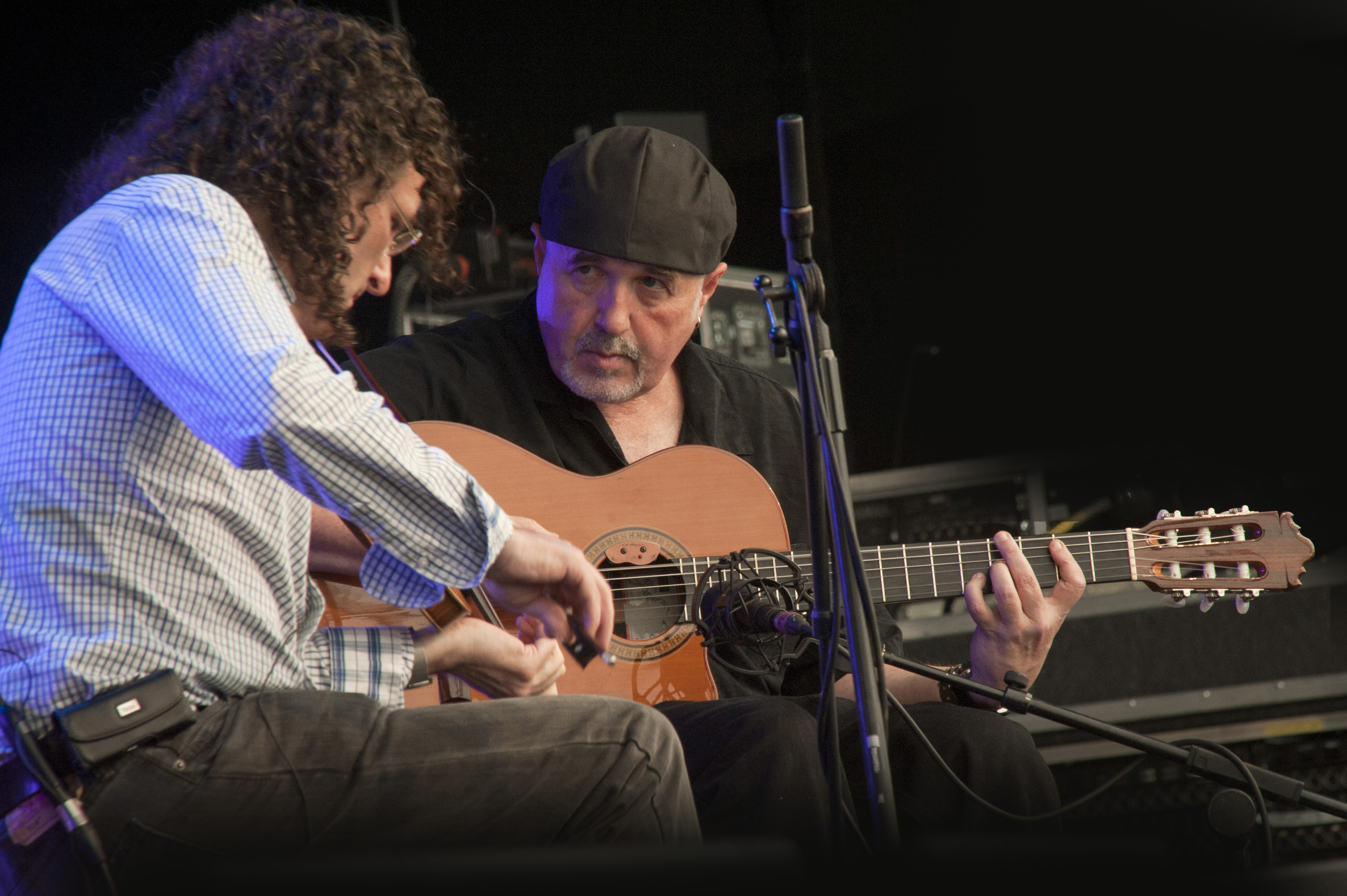

Background information
- Born: June 16, 1954; Chicago, Illinois, U.S.
- Died: June 20, 2022 (aged 68)
- Genre: Irish traditional music
- Occupation: Guitarist
- Years active: 1980s–2010s
- Label: Green Linnet
- Website: denniscahill.com

Dennis Cahill (June 16, 1954 – June 20, 2022) was an American guitarist who specialized in Irish traditional music. He was born in Chicago of parents from County Kerry, Ireland. He began playing guitar at the age of nine and studied the instrument at the Chicago Musical College. He was active in the Irish traditional music scene in Chicago in the 1980s and 1990s.

In the late 1980s, he and Irish fiddler Martin Hayes formed a band in Chicago called Midnight Court, which combined traditional music with rock and roll. The band, in which Cahill played a Fender Telecaster and Hayes an electric fiddle, was active between 1989 and 1992. After its demise, Cahill and Hayes continued to work together and formed an acoustic duo in 1996, developing an "unrushed, lyrical, highly expressive interpretation" of traditional Irish music. Cahill's chordal accompaniment used standard tuning.

In 1999, a New York Times reviewer described Hayes and Cahill's approach as "stripping old reels and jigs to their essence, leaving space between the notes for harmonics and whispered blue notes," resulting in "a Celtic complement to Steve Reich's quartets or Miles Davis's Sketches of Spain. " They toured extensively and released three recordings on the Green Linnet label: The Lonesome Touch (1997), Live in Seattle (1999), and Welcome Here Again (2008). Cahill and Hayes, along with singer Iarla Ó Lionáird, fiddler Caoimhín Ó Raghallaigh and pianist Doveman, were the members of The Gloaming, an Irish-American supergroup whose first album was released in 2014, winning the Meteor Choice Music Prize for Irish album of the year.

Cahill was married to Mary Joyce.
