= Pat Dillett =

American music producer

- Born: Patrick Dillett
- Occupations: Record producer; mixer; recording engineer

Patrick Dillett is a record producer, mixer, and sound engineer who is based in New York. He has worked with David Byrne, Donald Fagen, Nile Rodgers, and Thomas Bartlett also known as Doveman. He has worked with notable artists including They Might Be Giants, Sufjan Stevens, Rhye, Angelique Kidjo, Glen Hansard, Chris Thile, Laurie Anderson, Marisa Monte, St. Vincent, Caetano Veloso, and the National, as well as pop and R&B singers Mary J. Blige and Mariah Carey. Dillett has won 4 Grammys.

== Selected discography ==
=== Production ===
- They Might Be Giants – every album since Factory Showroom (1996–present)
- 1998: Lounge Lizards – Queen of All Ears (co-produced with John Lurie)
- 1998: Soul Coughing – El Oso
- 2004: David Byrne – Grown Backwards (co-produced with Byrne)
- 2005: Doveman – Acrobat (co-produced with Dougie Bowne)
- 2009: Doveman – The Conformist
- 2009: Tegan and Sara – "Alligator (remix)"
- 2012: David Byrne & St. Vincent – Love This Giant (co-produced & mixed with Byrne, Annie Clark and John Congleton)
- 2012: Julia Stone – By the Horns
- 2014: Angelique Kidjo – Eve
- 2018: David Byrne – American Utopia (co-produced with Byrne and Rodaidh McDonald)
- 2019: Joe Jackson – Fool
- 2020: Marvin Pontiac – The Asylum Tapes
- 2021: Steely Dan – Northeast Corridor: Steely Dan Live!
- 2023: Joe Jackson – What a Racket!
- 2024: Lizzie No – Halfsies (co produced with Graham Richman and Lizzie No)
- 2024: Joan as Police Woman – Lemons, Limes and Orchids
- 2026: Joe Jackson – Hope and Fury

=== Mixing ===
- 1990: Mariah Carey – Mariah Carey
- 1991: Caetano Veloso – Circuladô
- 1991: Ryuichi Sakamoto – Heartbeat
- 1993: Queen Latifah – Black Reign
- 1996: Aaliyah – One in a Million
- 1999: Arto Lindsay – Prize
- 2000: Marisa Monte – Memories, Chronicles and Declarations of Love
- 2007: Mary J. Blige – Growing Pains
- 2008: David Byrne & Brian Eno – Everything That Happens Will Happen Today
- 2009: Bebel Gilberto – All in One
- 2010: The National – High Violetb sides
- 2011: My Brightest Diamond – All Things Will Unwind
- 2011: Marisa Monte – O Que Você Quer Saber de Verdade
- 2012: Glen Hansard – Rhythm and Repose
- 2012: Julia Stone – By the Horns
- 2012: Donald Fagen – Sunken Condos
- 2013: Rhye – Woman
- 2013: Trixie Whitley – Fourth Corner
- 2014: The Gloaming – The Gloaming
- 2014: Anna Calvi – Strange Weather
- 2014: Dawn Landes – Bluebird
- 2015: Sufjan Stevens – Carrie & Lowell
- 2016: Kishi Bashi – Sonderlust
- 2017: St. Vincent – Masseduction
- 2017: Chris Thile – Thanks for Listening
- 2017: Blonde Redhead – 3 O'Clock
- 2018: They Might Be Giants – I Like Fun
- 2019: Kishi Bashi – Omoiyari
- 2019: Norah Jones – Begin Again
- 2019: Henry Jamison – Gloria Duplex
- 2020: Owen Pallett – Island
- 2020: Haux – Violence in a Quiet Mind
- 2023: Paul Simon – Seven Psalms
- 2024: Hollow Coves – Nothing to Lose
- 2024: Lizzie No – Halfsies
- 2024: Vancouver Sleep Clinic – Someone to Stay (acoustic)
- 2024: Nat and Alex Wolff (feat Billie Eilish) – Soft Kissing Hour
- 2025: Margaret Glaspy – The Golden Heart Protector
- 2026: Morrissey – Make Up is a Lie

=== Recording and engineering ===
- 1989: Diana Ross – Workin' Overtime
- 1990 - Aztec Camera – Stray
- 1992: Chic – "Chic Mystique"
- 2003: Mary J. Blige – Love and Life
- 2005: The Notorious B.I.G. – Duets: The Final Chapter
- 2010: Laurie Anderson – Homeland
- 2017: St. Vincent – Masseduction

=== Soundtrack and film ===
- 1995: Get Shorty (recording and mixing)
- 2002: Maid in Manhattan (engineer)
- 2009: Dark Was the Night – various artists benefit album for the Red Hot Organization (DVD mixing)
- 2013: A Portrait of Marina Abramović (mixing)
