= Doveman =

American musician (born 1981)

- Born: Thomas Bartlett; October 13, 1981 (age 44); Brattleboro, Vermont
- Occupations: Singer; pianist; producer
- Instrument: Piano
- Spouse: Ella Hunt (m. 2026)

Thomas Bartlett (born October 13, 1981), also known as Doveman, is an American pianist, producer, and singer. He has released four solo albums as Doveman, four albums as a member of The Gloaming, duo albums with the composer Nico Muhly and the hardanger d’amore player Caoimhín Ó Raghallaigh, and "Shelter," an album of solo piano compositions.

As a producer, Bartlett has worked with a range of notable artists, including Yoko Ono, St. Vincent, and Norah Jones. "Mystery of Love", a collaboration with Sufjan Stevens for the soundtrack to Call Me by Your Name, was nominated for an Academy Award for Best Original Song, and a Grammy Award for Best Song Written for Visual Media at the 61st ceremony. Bebel Gilberto's "Agora," produced, engineered and mixed by Bartlett, was nominated for Best Global Music Album at the 2021 Grammys, and he also contributed to Taylor Swift's Evermore, and Rufus Wainwright's Unfollow the Rules, both nominated that year. Since 2018, Bartlett has worked closely with Florence and the Machine, and in April 2021 it was announced that Florence and Bartlett were co-writing a Broadway-bound musical based on The Great Gatsby.

== Early life and education ==
Bartlett grew up in Putney, Vermont, where he started piano lessons as a young child. Bartlett and his childhood friend Sam Amidon, along with Amidon's younger brother Stefan, formed a contra dance band called Popcorn Behavior. They released three recordings, the first when Amidon and Bartlett were 13 years old. Bartlett played piano and composed some of the songs on the recordings. Amidon and Bartlett were interviewed about their music on the National Public Radio program All Things Considered in 1998.

As a child Bartlett was drawn to Irish traditional music, particularly as performed by the fiddler Martin Hayes, whose first album appeared in 1992. On a visit to Ireland with his parents when he was 12 Bartlett attended several of Hayes's concerts and met Hayes. On returning home Bartlett arranged for Hayes to play a concert in Vermont.

After graduation from high school Bartlett spent a year in London studying piano with Maria Curcio. He moved to New York and enrolled at Columbia University to study English. After three semesters he left university to become a professional musician.

== Musical career ==
Thomas Bartlett's musical career has emphasized collaboration, both as performer and producer.

While a student at Columbia, Bartlett became friends with Nico Muhly. They have continued to work together on a project called Peter Pears, after the English tenor who was Benjamin Britten's life partner. In 2018 they released an album entitled Balinese Ceremonial Music inspired by the Canadian composer Colin McPhee's gamelan transcriptions.

An early appearance playing piano for Chocolate Genius at Joe's Pub in New York introduced him to a number of musicians with whom he would later perform, as well as to his future producer Patrick Dillett. Among the singers he accompanied early in his career were David Byrne, Laurie Anderson, Yoko Ono, Anohni, and Martha Wainwright.

Bartlett used the name Doveman for his own live performances as a vocalist with a band and on three recordings made between 2005 and 2009. According to Bartlett, Doveman "has always been me and whoever I have along for that night", rather than "an organism that is a band".

Bartlett devoted himself increasingly to being a record producer rather than a sideman, stating in 2014 that collaboration "is what I enjoy the most" and that "producing records is where I'm the happiest and where I think my talents are best used".

In January 2011, Bartlett, as Doveman, began a monthly salon-style performance series at the West Village club (Le) Poisson Rouge, called the Burgundy Stain Sessions, inviting friends to join him and the band on stage. Over the course of the year, performers included Norah Jones, Glen Hansard, Rufus Wainwright, Martha Wainwright, Sara Quin, Beth Orton, Sam Amidon, Nico Muhly, Elysian Fields, Chocolate Genius, Julia Stone, Chris Thile, The Ghost of a Saber Tooth Tiger, Lisa Hannigan, and St. Vincent.

In October 2011 Bartlett music-directed, and co-curated with Hansard, two shows at (Le) Poisson Rouge celebrating the 10th anniversary of Other Voices, a live-music series broadcast on Irish television. Performers included Laurie Anderson, Damien Rice, Bell X1 (band), The Lost Brothers, Bryce Dessner and Aaron Dessner, Gabriel Byrne, Paul Muldoon, Colum McCann, and others.

With fiddle player Martin Hayes, guitarist Dennis Cahill, vocalist Iarla Ó Lionáird, and hardanger fiddle player Caoimhín Ó Raghallaigh, Bartlett is a member of The Gloaming. They have released four albums, all produced by Bartlett.

In 2019 Bartlett and fellow Gloaming member Caoimhín Ó Raghallaigh released a collaborative studio album entitled Caoimhín Ó Raghallaigh and Thomas Bartlett.

== Personal life ==
Bartlett has been in a relationship with the actress Ella Hunt since at least 2018, with the two marrying in January 2026.

== Discography ==
=== As producer ===
Year	Artist	Album	Notes
2007	Sam Amidon	But This Chicken Proved Falsehearted	producer, engineer, mixer
2011	Justin Vivian Bond	Dendrophile	producer
2012	Glen Hansard	Rhythm and Repose	producer
2012	Julia Stone	By the Horns	co-producer w/ Patrick Dillett
2012	Hannah Cohen	Child Bride	producer
2012	Justin Vivian Bond	Silver Wells	producer
2013	Trixie Whitley	Fourth Corner	producer
2013	Bell X1	Chop Chop	co-producer w/ Peter Katis
2013	Sam Amidon	Bright Sunny South	co-producer w/ Jerry Boys
2014	The Gloaming	The Gloaming	producer
2014	Anna Calvi	Strange Weather	producer
2014	Dawn Landes	Bluebird	producer
2015	Hannah Cohen	Pleasure Boy	producer
2015	Glen Hansard	Didn't He Ramble	co-producer w/ Dave Odlum
2015	Sufjan Stevens	Carrie & Lowell	producer, mixer
2015	The Gloaming	2	producer
2016	Martha Wainwright	Goodnight City	co-producer w/ Brad Albetta
2016	Magnetic Fields	50 Song Memoir	addition production
2017	Chris Thile	Thanks For Listening	producer
2017	Adrian Crowley	Dark Eyed Messenger	producer, engineer, mixer
2017	Sufjan Stevens	Call Me By Your Name soundtrack	producer, engineer, mixer "Mystery of Love", "Visions of Gideon", "Futile Devices (Doveman remix)
2017	Sufjan Stevens	"Exploding Whale (Doveman remix)"	producer
2018	Yoko Ono	Warzone	co-producer w/ Yoko Ono, engineer
2018	Olivia Chaney	Shelter	producer, engineer
2018	Joan As Policewoman	Damned Devotion	co-producer w/ Joan Wasser and Parker Kindred
2018	Mandy Patinkin	Diary: January 27, 2018	producer, engineer, mixer
2018	Rhye	Blood	producer & co-writer, "Please" and "Softly"
2018	St. Vincent	MassEducation	producer, performer
2018	The Gloaming	Live at NCH	producer
2018	Rufus Wainwright	"The Sword of Damocles" (single)	producer
2018	Norah Jones	"My Heart is Full" (single)	producer, engineer, co-writer
2018	Teitur	I Want To Be Kind	producer, engineer
2018	Sufjan Stevens	"Lonely Man of Winter (Doveman Mix)"	producer
2019	Henry Jamison	Gloria Duplex	producer, engineer
2019	Rhye	Spirit	producer, co-writer
2019	Angelo De Augustine	Tomb	producer, engineer, mixer
2019	The Gloaming	3	producer
2019	Florence and the Machine	Jenny of Oldstones	producer, engineer, mixer
2019	Norah Jones	Begin Again	producer, co-writer, engineer
2020	Mina Tindle	Sister	producer
2020	Bebel Gilberto	Agora	producer, co-writer, engineer
2020	Haux	Violence in a Quiet Mind	co-producer, engineer
2020	Sound of Metal	Green	producer, engineer
2021	Julia Stone	Sixty Summers	co-producer, co-writer, engineer
2022	Florence and the Machine	Dance Fever	co-producer, co-writer
2023	Bebel Gilberto	João	producer, engineer
