= Emily Oberman =

American graphic designer

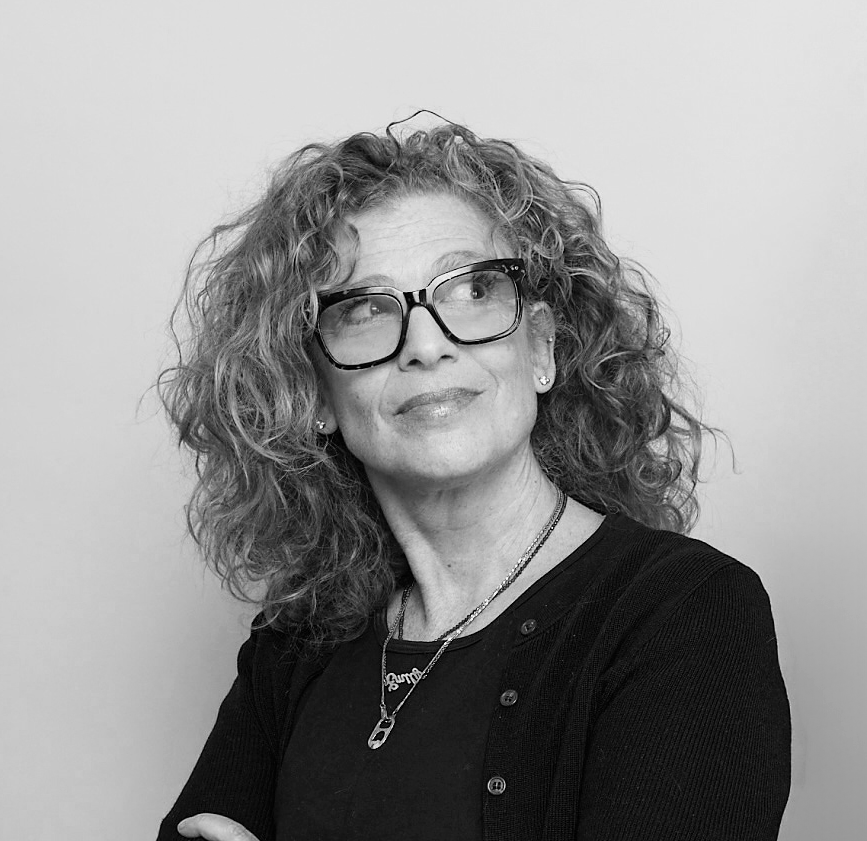
- Born: 1962 (age 63–64); Yonkers, New York
- Education: Cooper Union
- Occupation: multidisciplinary designer
- Spouse: Paul Sahre

Emily Oberman (born 1962) is a New York-based multidisciplinary designer and a partner at design studio Pentagram. Formerly, Oberman was a co-founder of design studio Number Seventeen and a designer at Tibor Kalman's studio M & Co.

== Early life and education ==
Oberman was born and raised in Yonkers, New York in 1962 by graphic designer Marvin and painter Arline Simon Oberman. As a child, she collaborated with her parents and was paid for the commercial work she did for them. She studied study motion design and filmmaking at Cooper Union.

Oberman has taught at The Cooper Union, the School of Visual Arts and Yale University. Currently, she teaches at the School of Visual Arts.

== Career ==
=== M&Co ===
After graduation, Oberman worked for Marcus Ratliff Inc. and shopped her portfolio around ultimately landing a position at Tibor Kalman’s design studio M&Co.

In collaboration with Kalman, she created work for the furniture company Knoll, Wieden & Kennedy advertising, and (the now closed) restaurant Florent. Some of Oberman’s first works for M&Co include covers for the 1987 November and December issues of Artforum, an international monthly magazine focused on contemporary art.

Beginning in 1988, Oberman worked with the American rock band Talking Heads to create a number of materials, including a video casing for Storytelling Giant, as well as the music video for the song "(Nothing But) Flowers." In 1991, Oberman was the first designer for the launch of Benetton’s critically acclaimed magazine, Colors. Other M&Co works include multiple printed ads for Isaac Mizrahi, and Florent restaurant. As well as album covers for musical artists Jerry Harrison, Laurie Anderson and David Byrne.

=== Number 17 ===
In 1998, Oberman co-founded the design firm under the name "Number Seventeen" with friend and peer Bonnie Siegler. The firm advertised its abilities in thinking, writing and designing and became known for their knack of understanding pop culture through wit and quirky sensibilities. In the firms seventeen year life span, the firm served over 80 clients. Including Newsweek, Lucky, Saturday Night Live, HBO, Orbitz, ABC and more.

At the firms beginning in 1998, it served one of Oberman's former clients from her time at M&Co, Colors. For NBC Universal, the studio created logos for TV series 30 Rock, Late Night with Jimmy Fallon, and Saturday Night Live. The studio also designed the opening title sequence for TV series Will and Grace. Other media work included the identity, promotion and launch advertising for radio network Air America and the creation of Lucky magazine for Condé Nast.

Beyond media work, the firm also accomplished identity developments for multiple retail and accommodation entities. These include The Mercer Hotel, The Maritime Hotel, Madstone Theaters, The Zinc Building, Spice Market and Housing Works Bookstore & Cafe.

In mid-2000s, Number Seventeen was commissioned to develop the brand and identity of the National September 11 Memorial & Museum of which the building and grounds were designed by contest winners, Michael Arad and Peter Walker.

In 2006, Oberman was one of the co-founders and creative directors of the website and daily bulletin Very Short List.

In 2008, Number Seventeen served Tina Brown in designing the launch and resurrection of journalism publication and blog, "The Daily Beast".

In 2012 Number Seventeen ceased accepting clients, as Oberman and Siegler parted ways to begin each of their owns next step. Intentionally or not, the firm lasted seventeen years. Siegler, founding her own new studio titled "Eight and a Half". Oberman, accepting a partner position at the New York office of the design firm Pentagram.

=== Pentagram ===
Oberman joined Pentagram's New York offices in April 2012 as a partner in the firm. Later that year, she worked alongside Naz Sahin to redesign the website for radio show This American Life. At Pentagram Oberman has served as a designer and director in the development of materials for clients including film review website Rotten Tomatoes, 2018 film Ready Player One, brand identity and motion graphics for the Film Independent Spirit Awards, and PBS series Third Rail with OZY, co-working space The Wing, Hudson River & Bike NY, among others.

In 2012, Oberman was hired by the band They Might be Giants to develop the music video for their song "Alphabet of Nations". In 2016, Oberman helmed the redesign of a new logo for American comics publisher DC Comics. Oberman also headed the branding and identity of The Queen Latifah Show. Oberman has also created identities for media entities including Tina Fey’s TV series Unbreakable Kimmy Schmidt, the 2016 film Fantastic Beasts and Where to Find Them, and the 2017 film Justice League. Oberman also designed a new iteration of the "shield" logo for Warner Bros. and its subsidiaries.

As of 2024 Oberman continues to develop work for NBC′s Saturday Night Live. In 2015, she designed a coffee table book entitled Saturday Night Live: The Book, which was edited by Alison Castle and published by Taschen. In 2018, the show's title sequence was redesigned by Pentagram under Emily Oberman's leadership, with custom typography and aesthetics influenced by the titles of Jean-Luc Godard films and the New York post-punk scene of the '80s.

== Awards and recognition ==
Oberman's work has been recognized by the AIGA, the Type Directors Club, and the Art Directors Club. In 2004, she was awarded the Augustus Saint-Gaudens Award for distinguished alumni from her alma mater Cooper Union. She has served on the national board of AIGA and as president of its New York chapter. While on the AIGA board she was responsible for two national conferences on design for television, DFTV.001 and DFTV.002.

In 2022, she won the AIGA Medal for her influence of pop culture.

== Personal life ==
Emily Oberman is married to designer Paul Sahre, the couple have a set of twins.
