= Idlewild (They Might Be Giants album) =

2014 compilation album by They Might Be Giants

Compilation album by They Might Be Giants
- Released: May 27, 2014
- Recorded: 2000–2012
- Genre: Alternative rock
- Length: 43:27
- Label: Idlewild Recordings, Lojinx
- Producer: Various

They Might Be Giants chronology
Nanobots (2013)	Idlewild (2014)	Glean (2015)

Idlewild is a compilation album by American alternative rock band They Might Be Giants, released on May 27, 2014. It is the third anthology released by the band through its own Idlewild Recordings. The album includes songs previously released between 1999's Long Tall Weekend and 2013's Nanobots.

== Reception ==
Consequence and SLUG stated that the album is a representative overview of the previous decade of They Might Be Giants' work, with the former describing it as a "reaffirmation of one of the best left-field acts in music" and the later noting the "superb" sound.

== Track listing ==
No.	Title	Original release	Length
1.	"Am I Awake?"	Indestructible Object (2004)	3:03
2.	"The Mesopotamians"	The Else (2007)	2:56
3.	"We Live in a Dump"	Cast Your Pod to the Wind (2007)	1:39
4.	"Experimental Film"	The Spine (2004)	2:56
5.	"Cloisonné"	Join Us (2011)	2:38
6.	"The Lady and the Tiger"	Join Us (2011)	2:55
7.	"Brain Problem Situation"	Cast Your Pod to the Wind (2007)	2:56
8.	"Tesla"	Nanobots (2013)	2:05
9.	"Certain People I Could Name"	Long Tall Weekend (1999)	3:24
10.	"You're on Fire"	Nanobots (2013)	2:41
11.	"Damn Good Times"	The Spine (2004)	2:39
12.	"Words Are Like"	TMBG Unlimited (2001)	1:36
13.	"Can't Keep Johnny Down"	Join Us (2011)	2:20
14.	"I'm Impressed"	The Else (2007)	2:39
15.	"Careful What You Pack"	The Else (2007)	2:40
16.	"Clap Your Hands"	No! (2002)	1:22
17.	"Electronic Istanbul (Not Constantinople)"	Album Raises New and Troubling Questions (2011)	2:51
Total length:			43:27
