= Type Directors Club =

Professional organization devoted to typography

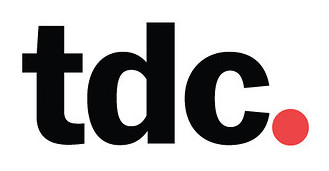
- Abbreviation: TDC
- Founded: 1946
- Type: Professional association
- Location: Headquarters in New York City
- Region served: Global
- Key people: Executive Director: Joe Newton, Strategic Program Manager: Griffin McCabe
- Website: tdc.org

The Type Directors Club (TDC) is an international professional organization devoted to typography and type design, founded in 1946 in New York City. It hosts competitions, events and exhibitions, produces publications, and awards scholarships that recognize outstanding design work in the fields of type design, typography and lettering. Since 2022, it'is part of the non-profit organization The One Club.

== Mission ==
TDC is dedicated to cataloging, showcasing, and exhibiting typography worldwide.

Founding member Milton Zudek described the club's goals at their first exhibit opening in 1947:

We simply want to make more and more advertising people aware of the importance of the agency typographer. We want them to realize that the selection of type for an advertisement demands a sixth sense that goes beyond the basic knowledge of typefaces—that it demands, in effect, the same kind of artistic sense that people have learned to associate with Art Directors, but are still learning to associate with Type Directors.” Speaking that same night, Paul Lang, a member of the Art Directors Club remarked, “When I began, artists were called layout men, renderers or finishers. When we insisted upon being called art directors, the advertising execs would say, ‘Call yourselves anything you like, but give us what we want.’ By the same token, if type directors keep calling themselves just that, they will, in time, be recognized for what they actually do contribute.”

== History ==
1943: The club was started as an unofficial gathering in New York City.

1946: The Type Directors Club organization was formed by several leading New York-based art directors, including Aaron Burns, Louis Dorfsman and Milton Zudeck. Membership to the organization was limited to men, was by invitation only and required a sponsorship by an existing member and a submission of one's portfolio, a process that remained unchanged until 1980s.

1959: On April 18, the TDC held Typography USA, a seminar at Biltmore Hotel in New York, with speakers that included Saul Bass, Paul Rand, Herbert Bayer, Lester Beall, William Golden, Leo Lionni, Herb Lubalin, and Ladislav Sutnar.

1960: The TDC recruited its first woman member, type designer and scholar Beatrice Warde.

1967: The TDC medal is first awarded as the organization's most prestigious award, dedicated to the artful craft of type and typography, to German type designer Hermann Zapf.

1987: The TDC’s first international conference Type 1987 was held in Manhattan, giving participants the opportunity to gather with celebrated international designers from outside the U.S. like Adrian Frutiger and Neville Brody.

2018: As part of a rebranding led by Debbie Millman, the TDC adopted the Type Drives Culture conference slogan. The same year, the club held the first Ascenders competition, aimed to promote the best designers under 35, and created a BIPOC scholarship, which was later renamed the Adé Hogue Scholarship.

2022: The TDC merged with The One Club.

2022: Upon the TDC’s reopening, Ksenya Samarskaya was appointed as TDC Managing Director with a mission to make it more open, diverse, and culturally engaging. TDC hosted Ezhishin, the first conference about Native North American typography. Type Drives Culture 22 conference held various sessions with the overarching theme “Type: The Next 75 Years”.

== TDC Medal ==
The TDC Medal is awarded for significant contributions to typography.

Year	Recipients
1967	Hermann Zapf
1968	R. Hunter Middleton
1971	Frank Powers
1972	Robert Leslie
1975	Edward Rondthaler
1979	Arnold Bank
1982	Georg Trump
1983	Paul Standard
1984	Paul Rand, Herb Lubalin (posthumously)
1985	Aaron Burns
1986	Bradbury Thompson
1987	Adrian Frutiger
1989	Ed Benguiat
1991	Gene Federico
1995	Lou Dorfsman
1997	Rolling Stone magazine, Matthew Carter
1998	Freeman Craw
2000	Günther Gerhard Lange, Colin Brignall
2003	Martin Solomon
2006	Paula Scher
2011	Mike Parker, Erik Spiekermann
2013	Gerrit Noordzij
2014	David Berlow
2015	Louise Fili
2016	Zuzana Licko and Rudy VanderLans of Emigre
2017	Gerard Unger
2018	Fiona Ross
2019	Wim Crouwel
2020	Rubén Fontana
2022	Akira Kobayashi
2023	Jan Middendorp
2024	Margaret Calvert

== Competitions ==
In 1955 the first TDC competition was held to recognize outstanding work in the profession. Since then, the TDC has been holding two yearly type competitions: one for the use of type and the letterform in design, and the other for typeface design. The winners are reproduced in the Typography Annual as well as displayed in seven exhibits that travel worldwide. In addition to celebrating outstanding achievements, the typography competitions and resulting annuals serve as historical records of typographic trends referenced by designers and scholars.

=== Typography ===
Previously known as Communication Design competition, the Typography competition is the extension of the original competition started in the 1950s.

=== Type design ===
The Type Directors Club Type Design Awards are given annually for excellence in typeface design. The award is generally viewed as being the most prestigious in the field.

==== Type design competition winners ====
Year	Winner
2000	Arcana Manuscript, Biblon, Blue Island, Cholla Slab, FF Clifford, Costa, Erica Sans, Homemade, Bitstream Kis Cyrillic, Klin, Mexica, Mirra, Diwan Mishafi, Myriad Pro Greek, Nani, Profile, Silentium Pro, Linotype Syntax
2001	ITC Aspera, Basilica, Linotype Conrad, Eplica, Hierarchy, Litteratra, Manuscript, Maya, Preissig, Really, Terminator, Warnock Pro, Zentra
2002	Text: Dreamer DD, Pradell, Whitman; Display: Alphatier, Azuza, Dearest, Globetrotter, ITC Jeepers, Keester, Media Core 3, Woodley Park; Type System: Brioso Pro, Federal, Rialto, Siemens
2003	Text: Arabic Typesetting, Carlin Script, Gentium, Laurentian; Display: Falafil, ITC Keefbats, Sakkal Seta Pro; Type System: Fontana ND, FF Strada, FTF Morgan, Full Moon Suite, Press Family, Suite, Sauna, ITC Tactile
2004	Text: Ardbeg, Argot, Maiola, Nyala, MS Uighur; Display: Brunn, Buttress, Sava Pro; Type System: Amira, Amplitude, FF Angkoon, Expo Sans, Farnham, Houston, Noam, FF Unit, Zocalo
2005	Text: Fabiol, Minuscule; Display: Bello, Bublik, Bunker, Dolce, Ed Gothic, Ed Script, Elementis, Pirouette, DB SantiPap, Scheck, Shipflat, Shoutenkaku / Shoutenmaru; Type System: FF Absara, Auto, Calibri, Rumba; Ornament: Super-Veloz
2006	Text: Aniene, Adobe Arabic, Calouste, Quixote; Display: Darka, Hogariet, Rayuela Chocolate 2.0, P22 Sweepy; Type System: Frutiger Next Greek, Garamond Premier Pro, Piclig, Relato Sans, Vista Sans; Ornament: FF Headz
2007	Text: Corundum Text, Greta Text, Untitled, EMT Lorena, Midan, Olga, Tisa; Type System: Arno Pro, Beorcana, Fakir, Nassim, Palatino Sans and Palatino Sans Informal, Quiosco, Xtra Sans; Display: Flexion, Manicotti, Peanut, Subtil; Ornament: Gregoria
2008	Text: Al Rajhi, Fondo, Marat, OTS Ethiopic, Palatino Arabic, Vodafone Hindi, Tiina; Type System: Anselm, Gloriola Standard and Display, National, Presidencia; Display: Blaktur, Burgues Script, Fresco Arabic, Logo Jr Black, Mommie, Sable, Slant, Swing, Ventura; Ornament: Restraint
2009	Text: Adios Script, Montague Script, Alda, Copte Scripte; Display: Klimax Bold, Nebulon, Optica Normal, Orbe
2010	Ingeborg, Deliscript, Kazuraki, Urbana Lnd, Joos, Espinosa Nova, Lavigne Display, ITC Legacy Square Serif Pro, Retiro, Narziss, Rieven, Fugu, Ysobel, Rum Black, Aisha, DecoType Nastaliq
2011	Brandon Grotesque, Eames Century Modern, Aero, Palatino Sans Arabic, Tundra, Amalta, Thuraya Regular, Shift, Supria Sans, FF Suhmo, News, Daisy, Matrona, Tabati, Nori, Eventide, Enzian, Elegy, Poem, Eames Poster Numerals
2012	Hipster Script, Chiavari, Balkan, La República, DecoType Ruq‘ah, Sutturah, Mr. Porter, Rekja, Greta Arabic, Harriet, Smidgen, Vibro, FF Mister K Informal
2013	Athena Ruby, JAF Bernini Sans, Karol, The Brill Family, Tegaki, Blanco, Vinter, Days and Nights, FF Chartwell, Baldufa, Iskra, Erotica, Agmena™, Jocham
2014	Sori, Metro Nova, Odesta, Azer, Pizza Press, Columbia Titling, Amplify, Chimera, Mislab, Duplicate Ionic, FF Quixo, Argentina, Ogg, Lalola, DecoType Nastaleeq Press, Venecia, Medusa, Flirt Script, MZhiHei Ultra Bold, Cloud Mountain Type, FREE, Bungee, Marcel Script, Chapitre Regular
2015	GT Sectra, Woodkit, Brando, Domaine Sans, Valter, Inei Mincho, Love Script, M Gentle Bold (正纖蘭體), Signo, A23D, Bustan Bold, Lale, Mohtaraf, Gibbs, Input, Proto Grotesk, Haltrix, Hollie Script Pro, Minotaur, Big Moore, GE Inspira Sans and Serif, M Ellan Light (幼雅蘭體)
2016	BC Mikser, Mornic, Tremolo, Bressay, Acanto Regia, Infini, Froben Antiqua, Zico, Bustani, Greta Arabic, The Spirit of Cursive Script, Greta Sans Hebrew, Bixa
2017	Salvaje, Lingering Fonts, Nordvest, Qandu, Bely, Sharp Grotesk, Qingyu Lishu, PILOT, Graebenbach, Lalezar, Laica, Rando, Renault Carname, Stratos, Eva
2018	Mirza, Lamon, IBM Plex, Source Han Serif, Noort, Origen, Teddy, Palago, Harrison Serif Pro, Read Greek Condensed, Koning, Vazeh, Ray, Artigo Display, Guyot, Oi!, Kinetic, Greta Text Hebrew
2019	Crochet, Rizado Script, New York Serif UI by Apple, Glinko Modern, Jali, Orientation, Ribaasu, Adobe Telugu, Minerale, No Molestar!, Sandwich, Sig, Pyk, Chek Lap sans, Faune, FR kraken slab, Heldane, Hope Sans, Pilat, Gustella, Punta Display, Le murmure
2020	
2021	Arabic Protest, Baryton, Coca-Cola Care, Garaje, Grab Community, Hebrew/Latin Extended, Hong Kong Beiwei Zansyu, Huai, Le Rosart, LiebeHeide Color, Lyon Arabic, Rail Alphabet 2, Retail, SF Symbols 2, Signifier, Super Condensed Devanagari, Vasakronan Serif, Vazeh Classic Quranic
2022	Amaala Arabic, ANEK Indic, Charisma, Englisch, FZ GuoMeiJinDao, FZ QianLongXingShu, Goldich, Greta Armenian, Hanyi yihexianjing, Jinhua Mincho, Klaket, Kristal, Lava Syllabics, Margit, Mithaq, Norbert, November Tamil, Oceanic, Platia, Qing Mocai Lishu, Resonay, RVS Basic, SF Arabic, SF Symbols 3, Shinbakusai Reisho, Tehran Museum of Contemporary Art, The Epicene Collection, The Mānuka Collection, Uwabami, YouTube Sans Arabic

=== Lettering ===
Started in 2022.

=== Ascenders ===
In 2018, the TDC inaugurated Ascenders, a competition to recognize the achievements of designers 35 years of age and younger. In its inaugural year, TDC honored nineteen Ascenders from around the world.

== Annual publications ==
TDC produces a design annual that features works awarded in its competition.

Year published	Title	Book designed by
1980	Typography 1	Jack G. Tauss
1981	Typography 2	Jack G. Tauss
1982	Typography 3	Joe Carnase
1983	Typography 4	Richard Moore
1984	Typography 5	Jonson Pedersen, Hinrichs and Shakery Inc.
1985	Typography 6	Olau Leu
1986	Typography 7	Arthur Boden
1987	Typography 8	David Brier
1988	Typography 9	Alan Peckolick
1989	Typography 10	Onofrio Paccione
1990	Typography 11	Larry Yang
1991	Typography 12	Jessica Weber
1992	Typography 13	Daniel Pelavin
1993	Typography 14	Mark van Bronkhorst
1994	Typography 15	Reverb, Los Angeles & Rick Vermeulen
1995	Typography 16	Drenttel Doyle Partners
1996	Typography 17	Michael Vanderbyl, Vanderbyl Design
1997	Typography 18	Bernhardt Fudyma Design Group
1998	Typography 19	L. Richard Poulin, Amy Kwon, Poulin + Morris
1999	Typography 20	Adam Greiss, Carin Goldberg
2000	Typography 21	The ATTIK
2001	Typography 22	Gail Anderson
2002	Typography 23	Allison Williams
2003	Typography 24	Alexander Isley
2004	Typography 25	Diego Vainesman
2005	Typography 26	Urshula Barbour, Paul Carlos, Pure + Applied
2006	Typography 27	Andy Kner
2007	Typography 28	Number Seventeen
2008	Typography 29	Philippe Apeloig
2009	Typography 30	Werner Design Werks
2010	Typography 31	Paul Sahre
2011	Typography 32	Matteo Bologna, Mucca Design
2012	Typography 33	Paula Scher
2013	Typography 34	Chip Kidd
2014	Typography 35	Brian Collins
2015	Typography 36	J. Abbott Miller
2016	Typography 37	Bobby C. Martin Jr., OCD
2017	Typography 38	Leftloft, Milan
2018	Typography 39	Triboro
2019	Typography 40	Hugh Miller, Bond Creative
2020	Typography 41	Anagrama
2021	Typography 42	Juan Carols Pagan, Sunday Afternoon
2022	Typography 43	Tereza Bettinardi

== Scholarships ==
Beatrice Warde Scholarship

The Beatrice Warde Scholarship stands to commemorate Beatrice Warde, the first female member of TDC, and all her contributions to the field of typography and to the TDC.

Winners receive a $5,000 USD award as well as a free one-year student membership to the TDC, offering discounts and other opportunities for conferences and events.

Previous winners of the award include Doah Kwon (2022) Ximena Amaya (2021), Tatiana Lopez (2020), Blossom Liu (2019), Anna Skoczeń (2018), Tasnima Tanzim (2017), Ania Wieluńska (2016), and Rebecca Bartola (2015).

Adé Hogue Scholarship

Adé Hogue scholarship, named since 2022 in honor of lettering designer Broderick Adé Hogue, was formerly known as the Superscript scholarship. A $5,000 prize, it's awarded annually to an outstanding junior college or first-year graduate degree BIPOC student demonstrating exceptional talent and promise in the design and creation of letterforms. Previous winners of the award include Ana Robles (2022) and Sakinah Bell (2021)

Ezhishin Scholarship

Started in 2023, the annual $5,000 scholarship, funded by Google, is for Native American and First Nation individuals in the US and Canada, respectively, who exemplify a creative practice that explores typography, type design, or relevant linguistic work. Winners receive a $5,000 USD award as well as a free one-year student membership to the TDC, offering discounts and other opportunities for conferences and events.

== Sponsors ==
The TDC has been sponsored by A to A Studio Solutions, Adobe Typeset, Typeset Design Matters, Designer Journals, Facebook Analog Research Laboratory, Firebelly, Google, Glyphs, Monotype, Morisawa, Pandora, School of Visual Arts, SVA Masters in Branding, Type Network which help to support the following initiatives:

- TDC Typography Annual
- Student scholarships
- Salons in NYC and other US cities
- Educational workshops
- TDC Book Night
- TDC Competition Judges Night
- New York exhibitions at TDC
- International exhibitions of competition winners
- Special events
