= Can't Keep Johnny Down =

Single by They Might Be Giants

from the album Join Us
- Released: May 2011
- Recorded: 2010 and 2011 in Manhattan
- Genre: Alternative rock
- Length: 2:22
- Label: Idlewild Recordings/ Rounder Records
- Songwriters: John Flansburgh, John Linnell
- Producers: They Might Be Giants and Pat Dillett

They Might Be Giants singles chronology
"I'm Impressed" (2007)	"Can't Keep Johnny Down" (2011)	"You're on Fire" (2013)

Music video
- Can't Keep Johnny Down on YouTube

"Can't Keep Johnny Down" is a song by American alternative rock band They Might Be Giants. The song was released as a promotional single from the band's 2011 album, Join Us. Like all the artwork surrounding the Join Us album, the cover art and labels for the disc were designed by the Office of Paul Sahre.

== Composition ==
"Can't Keep Johnny Down" was written by John Linnell. Linnell claims that the song is not a biographical song about himself or fellow band member John Flansburgh, though the character's name was selected intentionally, in order to create a contrast between his personality and that of the two Johns. John Flansburgh describes the song as "...a song of defiance. It's an incredibly catchy song. That's a very nice, bittersweet concoction of a very bitchy lyric with an incredibly sunny arrangement. It's sort of Britpop." He adds that he found the song to be a very strong track. Flansburgh also said, of the titular character, "The lyric is about a guy who seems like he's got some mixed emotions about the world. He's sort of reading everything in a hostile way."

== Reception ==
Rated as one of the best songs of 2011, PopMatters said the song was Smiths-like, as the, "song's malcontent narrator, singing about imagined triumphs over imagined slights, hits a similarly sweet-and-sour tone. Then again, marrying catchy melodies to dark lyrics has always been their specialty; this instant classic proves it's a talent undiminished by time." The A.V. Club noted the song kicks off Join Us, "in winning fashion, showcasing Linnell’s surprising late-career ability to craft a slick pop tune."

== Music video ==
The music video for "Can't Keep Johnny Down" was released by the band via YouTube on October 4, 2011. It was the band's first live action music video since 2004. The video was directed by Brad and Brian Palmer and stars Rip Torn. John Linnell and John Flansburgh are not featured in the music video.

They Might Be Giants also held a contest for fans to create an unofficial music video for the song. About 100 amateur videos were submitted. The winner and several runners-up were selected by John Hodgman, who also wrote up his favorite videos on his website. The winning video was created by Mohit Jaswal, Eduardo Urueana, and Justin Dean, who received a prize of $1,000. Runners-up received free pizzas. Both the official video and the winning music video were included as a video downloads with purchases of the They Might Be Giants rarities compilation, Album Raises New And Troubling Questions, from the band's website. The videos were also collected for the band's 2013 music video compilation, Them Ain't Big Eye Ants.

== Personnel ==
They Might Be Giants

- John Flansburgh - vocals, electric guitar
- John Linnell - vocals, keyboards

Backing band

- Marty Beller - drums
- Dan Miller - acoustic guitar
- Danny Weinkauf - bass

Production

- They Might Be Giants and Pat Dillett - producers
- Jon Altschuler and Greg Thompson - engineers
- Pat Dillett - mixing
