= Calori & Vanden-Eynden =

American company

CVEDesign, formally Calori & Vanden-Eynden (est. 1982) is a New York City-based firm specializing in environmental graphic design (EGD): signage, wayfinding, placemaking, and user navigation systems within the built environment.

The firm's notable EGD work includes Washington, D.C.'s citywide pedestrian wayfinding system (Washington Post feature); branded signage for Amtrak’s Acela train service, which received a gold IDEA award from the Industrial Designers Society of America (IDSA); signage for New York City’s Second Avenue Subway; signage for the Rock and Roll Hall of Fame and Museum (in partnership with Alexander Isley); and environmental graphics for Planned Parenthood of New York, Cornell University's Stocking Hall, Tecnológico de Monterrey University, and The Riverside Church, among others. The firm's work has also been recognized for excellence by the American Institute of Graphic Arts (AIGA), the American Institute of Architects New York Chapter (AIANY), and the Society for Environmental Graphic Design (SEGD). In 2018 the firm merged with Entro Communications of Toronto, Canada.

== Principals ==
Chris Calori and David Vanden-Eynden are both Fellows of the Society for Environmental Graphic Design. Calori received the Distinguished Member Award from the SEGD in 2002 for, "demonstrating outstanding volunteer efforts while significantly contributing to the direction, growth, and excellence of SEGD programs." Vanden-Eynden received the Angel Award from the SEGD in 2004 for, "promoting the highest values in EGD and significantly contributing to the direction and growth of the organization."

Calori and Vanden-Eynden each graduated from The Ohio State University (OSU) in Columbus, Ohio, with Calori holding an MA in design planning. Calori received a Distinguished Alumni Award from OSU's Department of Industrial, Interior, and Visual Communication Design in 2008.
