= Number Seventeen (design) =

Number Seventeen was a Manhattan-based graphic design studio formed by Emily Oberman and Bonnie Siegler, in operation from 1993 to 2012. The studio specialized in graphics for print, film, and television media. Their clients included Saturday Night Live, MTV and Jane Magazine. They were responsible for creating the opening titles for the NBC sitcom Will and Grace.

Before forming Number Seventeen, Oberman worked with Tibor Kalman at M&Co. Siegler was a design director at VH1.

Number Seventeen was featured in Eye magazine (No. 39, Vol. 10, Spring 2001) in an article by Steven Heller. In that article Siegler is quoted:

“Everything is storytelling,” Siegler says, “and what we are always trying to do is communicate an idea, be it an abstract solution or a narrative one. Always inherent in the idea is an emotional component that we hope will work on a more subconscious level.”

In 2012, Emily Oberman joined Pentagram, while Bonnie Siegler went on to found a design studio named Eight and A Half.
