= Nanobots (album) =

2013 studio album by They Might Be Giants

Studio album by They Might Be Giants
- Released: March 5, 2013
- Recorded: March – December 19, 2012
- Studios: Pat Dillett's studio in Manhattan, Collyer Brothers Studio in Brooklyn, and The Governor's Bluff in Sullivan County
- Genres: Alternative rock, art pop
- Length: 44:47
- Labels: Idlewild (US); Lojinx (EU); Breakaway (AU)
- Producer: Pat Dillett

They Might Be Giants chronology
Album Raises New and Troubling Questions (2011)	Nanobots (2013)	Idlewild (2014)

Nanobots is the sixteenth studio album by American alternative rock band They Might Be Giants. The album was released on March 5, 2013 on Idlewild Recordings, the band's independent imprint, with Megaforce Records in the U.S. The album was also separately released on March 8 in Australia through Breakaway Records and on March 11 in Europe, through Lojinx. One week before its physical release, Nanobots was released digitally for streaming in its entirety through the band's SoundCloud, announced by Rolling Stone. Prior to this, "Call You Mom", "Black Ops" and "Lost My Mind" were released through the advance digital Nanobots EP in January 2013. The EP, released through Amazon and iTunes, was met with fairly positive responses.

== Production ==
The album was recorded in Manhattan and produced by Patrick Dillett. The relatively short run time is accounted for by the fact that the album includes many of what band member John Flansburgh describes as "extremely short songs". Flansburgh added that "the songs kind of stand alone. When you listen to the album alone, it has this manic pacing to it with the short songs. It makes for a different kind of listening experience." John Linnell commented that these songs were naturally written as short songs to avoid over-populating them with unnecessary verses and choruses. This distinguishes them from the "Fingertips" suite of songs under one minute long on Apollo 18, as those songs were written specifically with brevity in mind, and were described by Linnell as having been "hyper-arranged".

== Artwork ==
Artwork for Nanobots was designed by Paul Sahre, using collages by artist Sam Weber. Throughout the album artwork, four of Weber's collages are used: Ingres, Hansel, Jester(clown), and Blue Beard 2. The same style was used for the Nanobots EP. The first of these collages, Ingres (prominently featuring the painting The Princesse de Broglie by Jean-Auguste-Dominique Ingres), is used as the album's cover art. The collages were described by Christopher R. Weingarten for Spin as "Max-Ernst-gone-Saw".

== Promotion ==
Before the release of the full album, two tracks from the album were released digitally. "Call You Mom" and "You're on Fire" were made available through Rolling Stone and Stereogum, respectively, in the winter preceding the album's release. A full week before the album's official release date, the entire album was also uploaded to TMBG's SoundCloud. Further emphasizing the availability of free music via the Internet, the band also released a mobile app for iOS and Android devices. The app, which is updated daily, allows the user to stream five They Might Be Giants tracks at a time.

They Might Be Giants played an international tour in support of Nanobots. The tour included shows in North America and Australia.

== Reception ==
Professional ratings
Aggregate scores
Source	Rating
Metacritic	69/100 (8 reviews)
Review scores
Source	Rating
AllMusic	3.5/5 stars
Consequence	C−
Paste	(favorable)
Robert Christgau	(B+)
NME	2.5/5 stars

Nanobots has garnered generally positive reviews from critics. It has received an aggregate score of 69 (based on 8 reviews) on Metacritic. Both Heather Phares, writing for AllMusic, and Steven Arroyo for Consequence indicated approval of the album's selection of tracks that run under a minute long. Reviewers also found Nanobots to be similar to some of the band's earlier material. In particular, the album was compared to Apollo 18, which featured "Fingertips", a series of 21 songs, almost all under 30 seconds long. Longtime music critic Robert Christgau described "Tesla" as "strong as‑-and more soulful than‑-anything in their catalogue", and also cited "Black Ops" and "Replicant" as highlights.

The album debuted at No. 57 on the Billboard 200. The album also spent a few weeks on the CMJ Radio 200 chart, peaking at No. 13 in April.

== Track listing ==
No.	Title	Length
1.	"You're on Fire"	2:41
2.	"Nanobots"	2:45
3.	"Black Ops"	3:11
4.	"Lost My Mind"	2:50
5.	"Circular Karate Chop"	2:56
6.	"Call You Mom"	3:06
7.	"Tesla"	2:04
8.	"Sleep"	0:42
9.	"Stone Cold Coup d'Etat"	2:57
10.	"Sometimes a Lonely Way"	2:40
11.	"Destroy the Past"	0:16
12.	"9 Secret Steps"	1:56
13.	"Hive Mind"	0:06
14.	"Decision Makers"	0:15
15.	"Nouns"	0:17
16.	"There"	0:09
17.	"Insect Hospital"	1:30
18.	"Tick"	0:11
19.	"Replicant"	2:55
20.	"The Darlings of Lumberland"	3:21
21.	"Great"	0:52
22.	"Stuff Is Way"	1:37
23.	"Icky"	2:32
24.	"Too Tall Girl"	2:34
25.	"Didn't Kill Me"	0:31
Total length:		44:47

=== Australian bonus CD ===
The Australian CD, released through Breakaway Records, was packaged with a bonus disc containing seven live tracks.

No.	Title	Length
1.	"Santa's Beard"	1:54
2.	"Ana Ng"	4:10
3.	"Careful What You Pack"	2:42
4.	"Withered Hope"	3:16
5.	"Judy Is Your Viet Nam"	1:31
6.	"Istanbul (Not Constantinople)"	6:18
7.	"How Can I Sing Like A Girl?"	2:56
Total length:		21:47

== Personnel ==
They Might Be Giants

- John Linnell – songwriting, vocals, accordion, keyboards, bass clarinet, contra-alto clarinet, saxophones, programming
- John Flansburgh – songwriting, vocals, guitar, keyboards, programming
- Marty Beller – drums
- Dan Miller – guitar, piano on 10
- Danny Weinkauf – bass guitar

Additional musicians

- Stan Harrison – saxophone on 6, saxophones, clarinets and flute on 20
- Jon Graboff – mandolin on 13
- Jedediah Parish – vocals on 14
- Chris Thompson – vibraphone (19, 24)
- Robin Goldwasser – vocals (1, 9, 16, 24)

Production

- Patrick Dillett – producer
- Jon Altschuler – engineer
- Paul Sahre – graphic design
- Sam Weber – artwork

== See also ==
- Nikola Tesla in popular culture
