= Erica De Mane =

American writer and chef

Erica A. De Mane
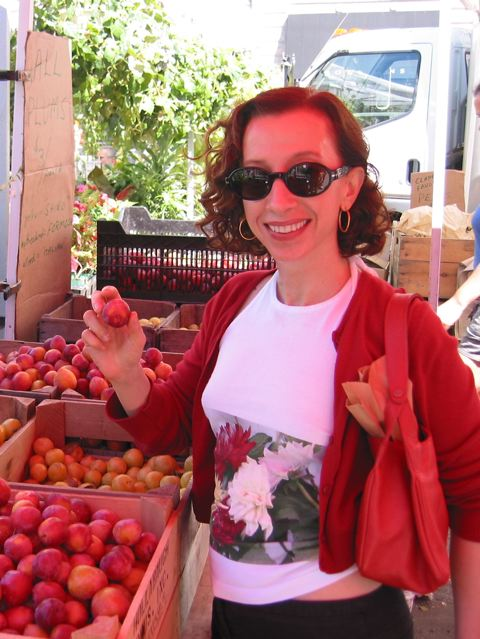
- At the Union Square Farmer's Market, September 2003
- Born: December 3, 1953 (age 72); Rye, New York
- Occupation: Writer
- Known for: Books and journalism about southern Italian cuisine

Erica De Mane (born December 3, 1953, in Rye, New York, United States) is an American chef, food writer, and teacher who specializes in Italian cooking. She is the author of The Flavors of Southern Italy, Pasta Improvvisata, and Williams-Sonoma Pasta, and contributed to the Italian section of the 1997 revision of Joy of Cooking. She is a member of the International Association of Culinary Professionals, the Italy-based international Slow Food movement, and the Culinary Historians of New York.

== Background ==
Erica developed her interest in cooking as a teenager, drawing inspiration from the recipes she grew up with in her family's southern Italian–American kitchen on Long Island. She studied journalism at the Fashion Institute of Technology from 1975 to 1977 and at New York University from 1977 to 1979, and attended the New York Restaurant School from 1983 to 1984. In 1985, she began cooking at Manhattan restaurants, including Le Madri and The Florent. Her play, Kitchen Arts, a comedy about cooking, was produced at Manhattan's 13th Street Repertory Company in 1987.

== Cooking style ==
As the titles of her books imply, Erica's cooking is improvisation-driven and her style derived from the flavors of southern Italy: the bitter olive oil and oranges, the honey laced agrodolce (sweet and sour), the salty anchovies, capers, and olives, and the mix of peasant and regal that are hallmarks of the cooking of the mezzogiorno. Her family's food, from inland Apulia, with its flavors of tomato, garlic, and wild greens, inspired research that eventually took her to Sicily, Naples, and Calabria. There she studied the traditional cooking of the entire region, expanding her palate, and soon began improvising while never straying too far from the flavors that give southern Italian cooking its distinctive charm. Southern Italians recognize Erica's dishes, even at their most creative, as being purely southern Italian in spirit, at least in part because of her continuous search for the best and most authentic ingredients available. She has stated that she never makes a dish exactly the same way twice—a radically different approach from her family's, where the rules of traditional Italian cooking were set in stone.

== Books and journalism ==
Erica's first published articles appeared in Food & Wine magazine in 1993 (she also worked in their test kitchen), and subsequently in The New York Times, Gourmet, and Fine Cooking, among other publications. Her monthly food column appeared in Marie Claire magazine from 1997 to 1999. A monthly column on the Mediterranean diet appeared in MyCurves, an online publication of Curves Fitness, the international fitness chain, from 2012 to 2014. In 2015 she began developing recipes and writing for Weight Watchers. Her first book, Pasta Improvvisata, published by Scribner in 1999, was chosen by The New York Times as one of the best cookbooks of the season for its June 1999, twice-yearly cookbook roundup. That was followed by Pasta, for Williams-Sonoma, in 2003, and The Flavors of Southern Italy, published by John Wiley & Sons in 2005. The latter was chosen by both Publishers Weekly and Food & Wine as one of the best cookbooks of the year. She is currently working on a collection of essays on Italian flavor combinations. A novel-in-progress about a hapless American magazine editor abroad in Italy, written with Barbara Calamari, is tentatively entitled Devil Lady.

== Media and appearances ==
Since 1998, Erica's blog (originally Skinny Guinea, currently Improvisation Italian-Style) has offered many of her recipes, as well as essays on her cooking philosophy, reviews of her books, and her carefully chosen artwork, illustrated by a popular running feature, Women with Fish. She has appeared on Food Talk with Arthur Schwartz, on the Food Network, on Bloomberg Radio's Dining with Peter Elliot, on the Heritage Radio Network, and on other national and local radio and TV shows. She has given cooking demonstrations at numerous gourmet shops, bookstores, farmers’ markets, and culinary events, including De Gustibus and The New York Times Style magazine's “Taste of T.” She also teaches private and group cooking classes on southern Italian cooking and diet.

== Personal ==
Erica De Mane is married to Fred Allen, an editor at Forbes magazine. They live in Manhattan with Red, her Japanese Bobtail cat.
