= Join Us =

Studio album by They Might Be Giants
- Released: July 19, 2011
- Recorded: March 2009 – 2011
- Genre: Indie pop
- Length: 47:07
- Label: Idlewild
- Producers: They Might Be Giants, Pat Dillett

They Might Be Giants chronology
Here Comes Science (2009)	Join Us (2011)	Album Raises New and Troubling Questions (2011)

Join Us is the fifteenth studio album by American alternative rock band They Might Be Giants, released on July 19, 2011. Following the success of two of their children's albums under the Disney Sound label, Join Us marked the band's return to adult audiences with an eclectic collection of 18 songs. Their previous adult album had been 2007's The Else four years prior.

In an interview with The A.V. Club, Flansburgh commented, "We probably recorded 30 songs for this album, and the songs that are on album are basically the last 15 or so. There were so many strange misfires at the beginning, just the most mutant songs." Some of the songs that were left off Join Us were later completed and released on the rarities compilation Album Raises New And Troubling Questions.

== Promotion ==
Two de facto singles emerged: "Can't Keep Johnny Down", which was released as a free MP3 on Pitchfork's website on April 5, as well as a promotional CD, and "You Probably Get That A Lot", which was promotionally issued in the UK. Music videos were produced for both singles, the former starring Rip Torn, although both tracks failed to chart. The songs "Spoiler Alert" and "Cloisonné" also received music videos starring the band. The music video for "When Will You Die", which featured the construction of a life-size monster hearse by the Office of Paul Sahre (OOPS), went viral and achieved over 100,000 views total—with more than 25,000 in just one month. The monster hearse cover artwork for Join Us was also very well-received, with Sahre being nominated for a 2012 Design of the Year Award from the Design Museum.

NPR released a Tiny Desk Concert performance by the band shortly after the album was released, with the group playing "Can't Keep Johnny Down" and "Cloisonné" from the new album.

== Reception ==
Professional ratings
Aggregate scores
Source	Rating
Metacritic	(70/100)
Review scores
Source	Rating
AllMusic	3.5/5 stars
The A.V. Club	B
Consequence	3.5/5 stars
Los Angeles Times	3/4 stars
No Ripcord	7/10 stars
Paste	(8/10)
The Phoenix	3/4 stars
PopMatters	6/10 stars
Rolling Stone	3.5/5 stars
Spin	(8/10)

Join Us has garnered fairly positive reviews from critics. It debuted at No. 32 on the Billboard 200 Albums chart and No. 8 on both the Billboard Rock Albums and Billboard Alternative Albums charts. Join Us also debuted at No. 8 on both the Billboard Rock and Billboard Alternative charts. It disappeared from the charts the following week. Join Us appeared at No. 20 on the CMJ Radio 200 on July 25, 2011. It climbed to No. 11 on August 2 and continued its ascension, reaching No. 5 on August 23. It spent 20 weeks on that chart.

== Track listing ==
All tracks are written by They Might Be Giants.

No.	Title	Length
1.	"Can't Keep Johnny Down"	2:23
2.	"You Probably Get That a Lot"	2:57
3.	"Old Pine Box"	1:53
4.	"Canajoharie"	3:39
5.	"Cloisonné"	2:40
6.	"Let Your Hair Hang Down"	2:31
7.	"Celebration"	3:48
8.	"In Fact"	2:20
9.	"When Will You Die"	2:32
10.	"Protagonist"	2:49
11.	"Judy Is Your Viet Nam"	1:26
12.	"Never Knew Love"	2:54
13.	"The Lady and the Tiger"	2:53
14.	"Spoiler Alert"	2:39
15.	"Dog Walker"	2:32
16.	"2082"	1:55
17.	"Three Might Be Duende"	2:25
18.	"You Don't Like Me"	2:57

== Personnel ==
They Might Be Giants

- John Linnell – lead vocals, backup vocals, keyboards, bass clarinet, accordion, saxophones, programming
- John Flansburgh – lead vocals, backup vocals, guitar, programming
- Dan Miller – lead guitar, keyboards
- Danny Weinkauf – bass, keyboards
- Marty Beller – drums, percussion

Additional musicians

- Stan Harrison – horn arrangement on track 5; saxophones on tracks 5, 9 and 17; bass flute on track 14
- Curt Ramm – trumpet on tracks 8, 9, 10, 13 and 17
- Dan Levine – trombone on tracks 9, 13 and 17
- Mauro Refosco – percussion on tracks 13 and 15
- David Driver – lead vocal on track 17
- Michael Cerveris – lead vocal on track 17

Production

- Pat Dillett – producer, engineer
- Jon Altschuler – engineer
- Greg Thompson – engineer
- UE Nastasi – mastering
- Paul Sahre – cover art

== Chart performance ==
Charts	Peak position
U.S. Billboard 200	32
U.S. Billboard Rock Albums	8
U.S. Billboard Digital Albums	9
U.S. Billboard Alternative Albums	8
U.S. Billboard Tastemaker Albums	14
