= Maira Kalman =

American writer and illustrator

- מאירה קלמן
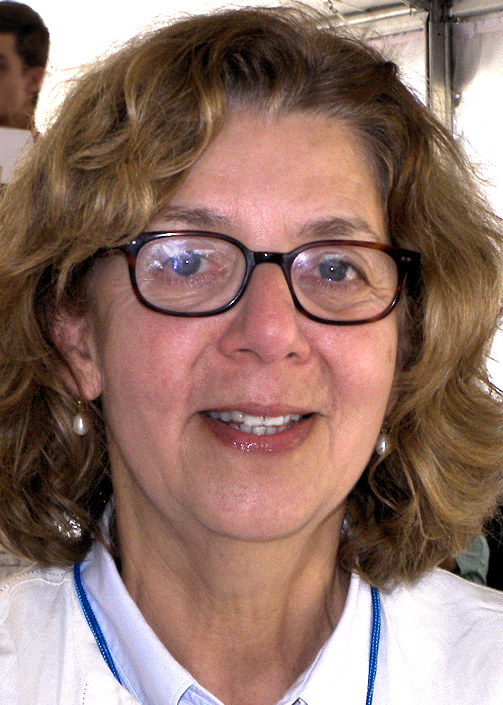
- Kalman in 2010
- Born: November 15, 1949 (age 77); Tel Aviv, Israel
- Known for: artist, illustrator, author, designer
- Spouse: Tibor Kalman (m. 1981; died 1999)
- Children: 2
- Website: MairaKalman.com

Maira Kalman (Hebrew: מאירה קלמן) is an American artist, illustrator, writer, and designer known for her painting and writing about the human condition. She is the author and illustrator of over 30 books for adults and children and her work is exhibited in museums around the world. She has been a regular contributor to The New York Times and The New Yorker.

== Early life ==
Kalman was born in Tel Aviv, Israel. Her mother, Sara Berman, was originally from Belarus and had moved to Israel to escape pogroms.

When Kalman was four years old, her family moved to Riverdale, Bronx in New York City. Her mother, Sara, spent a significant amount of time at the Loehmann's department store. She was known for her chic style, and she wore only the color white. Kalman attended the High School of Music & Art (now known as LaGuardia High School) where she studied art. Kalman attended New York University (NYU), where she studied English literature. By the time Kalman left for college, her parents had returned to Israel.

At the age of 18, Kalman met designer Tibor Kalman at New York University, he was a native of Budapest who had moved to New York City as a child. She explained, "We met in this class of misfits in summer school. They said, You have to take these classes, otherwise we're going to throw you out. What was interesting was the mix of crazy people in that group... So we met there, and he asked me out on a date. And you know in your life, when you meet somebody [and] you go, 'I've known you for a thousand years,' and there's not even an iota of a question?"

== Career ==
=== M&Co. ===
In 1979, Tibor founded the graphic and design consultancy, M&Co. and Maira played an important role in the development of the company. She never actually worked at M & Co. but offered ideas, suggestions, and support. The firm grew to be highly influential; it was known for its innovative use of images and typography. M & Co. created work for Interview magazine, Restaurant Florent, the band Talking Heads, the National Audubon Society, and the Museum of Modern Art.

=== Inter-disciplinary arts practice ===
Kalman's priorities began to shift with the birth of her children in the 1980s. Beginning in the mid-1980s, Kalman began to publish children's books. Her first children's book, Stay Up Late (1985), featured illustrations paired lyrics of musician David Byrne. The book told the story of children who prevent their baby brother from falling asleep.

After Tibor passed in 1999, Maira Kalman began creatively asserting herself, writing more than 20 books over the years. As mentioned in an interview in 2019, Kalman notes how she always had a passion for writing, and that she was always interested in the field. Kalman did not consider herself just a writer, but addressed that she was a storyteller, a journalist, a designer and a humorist. Over the course of her career, Kalman has written a series of children's books about Max Stravinsky, the poet-dog. She created the sets for the Mark Morris Dance Group production of Four Saints in Three Acts, an opera by Virgil Thompson and Gertrude Stein.

In addition, she has been a contributor for The New Yorker since 1995 and has produced many cover illustrations as well as illustrated columns. Most notably, Kalman collaborated with Rick Meyerowitz for The New Yorker December 2001 cover, called New Yorkistan. This cover created a lot of attention to the public since the magazine tackled tribalism in the city. The magazine emptied the newsstands within two days.

In 2002, Kalman's children's book, Fireboat: The Heroic Adventures of John J. Harvey, was released. This focuses on New York City's more recent terror attack on the twin towers. September 11, 2001, marks the day in which the twin towers fell. John J. Harvey served for the World Trade Center attack, being one of the first responding boats arriving to the attacks that day. This book educates many young individuals who may not have been around at the time. This book actively describes the history behind Harvey and the importance of this day.

The urban environment of New York City brings Kalman's creativity to life and has also drawn inspiration from the city's geography and well known landmarks. Her picture book both written and illustrated by Kalman, Fireboat: The Heroic Adventures of the John J. Harvey won the annual Boston Globe–Horn Book Award for Nonfiction in 2003. Her 2003 feature of Gouache paintings at Julie Saul exhibition was noted by New York Times Art Guide to indicate a style of Alice Neel visualizing Indian miniature paintings.

In 2005, Kalman is also known for her illustrations for the 2005 edition of The Elements of Style, the popular guide to writing style, by William Strunk. She also designed production sets for an opera about Gertrude Stein.

Kalman wrote the monthly illustrated blog from April 2006 to April 2007, The Principles of Uncertainty, for the New York Times. The blog was published in a book of the same title, which was released in 2007. During 2009, Kalman wrote another illustrated blog in The New York Times called And the Pursuit of Happiness about American democracy. The blog was published as a book in 2010. The first chapter chronicles her visit to Washington, D.C. for President Barack Obama's inauguration. Kalman's work is also featured on Rosenbach Museum and Library's 21st Century Abe project.

Kalman crafted the illustrations for author Daniel Handler's Lemony Snicket series including the books, 13 Words (2010) and Why We Broke Up (2011). The two went on to collaborate on a illustrated book, Girls Standing on Lawns, published in 2014 by The Museum of Modern Art. Exploring MoMA's collection of photography, Kalman and Handler combined vintage photographs with Kalman's paintings and Handler's prose.

In 2014, My Favorite Things, by Maira Kalman, was published by Harper Design, a division of HarperCollins. The book focused on significant objects from the Cooper Hewitt and the personal collection of Kalman, such as a pocket watch possessed by Abraham Lincoln, original editions of Alice's Adventures in Wonderland and Winnie-the-Pooh, and photographs that Kalman had taken.

In 2017, she was awarded the AIGA Medal for her work in "storytelling, illustration, and design while pushing the limits of all three."

In the summer of 2017, Kalman collaborated with choreographer John Heginbotham to produce a theatrical and dance interpretation of Kalman's blog, The Principles of Uncertainty. It debuted in late August at Jacob's Pillow, and had its New York premier at the Brooklyn Academy of Music Fisher in late September. Kalman performed in the piece, playing herself. Then in the Fall of that year, Kalman was a resident at the American Academy in Rome.

From November 2019 to April 2020, Kalman's publications were exhibited at the Eric Carle Museum of Picture Book Art in Amherst, Massachusetts. Kalman’s illustrations covered a pre-show curtain for David Byrne’s Broadway production “American Utopia”, which ran from 2019-2020 and again from 2021-2022.

=== Exhibitions ===
List of select exhibitions by Kalman:

- 2003 – Just Looking, Julie Saul Gallery, New York, NY
- 2005 – I Can't Stand All the Excitement, Julie Saul Gallery, New York, NY
- 2007 – The Principles of Uncertainty, Julie Saul Gallery, New York, NY
- 2008 – Just Looking, Beihang University, Beijing, China
- 2009 – The Elements of Style, Memorial Art Gallery, University of Rochester, Rochester, NY
- 2010 – Contemporary Jewish Museum, San Francisco, CA; Institute of Contemporary Art, University of Pennsylvania, Philadelphia, PA
- 2010 – Further Illuminations, Julie Saul Gallery, New York, NY
- 2010 – Various Illuminations (of a Crazy World), The Jewish Museum, New York, NY; Skirball Cultural Center, Los Angeles, CA
- 2011 – 25 Years/25 Artists, Julie Saul Gallery, New York, NY
- 2011 – Storied City: New York in Picture Book Art, Katonah Museum of Art, Katonah, NY
- 2012 – 37 Paintings, Julie Saul Gallery, New York, NY
- 2013 – What Pete Ate from A to Z, Madison Children's Museum, Madison, Wisconsin
- 2014 – Girls Standing on Lawns and Other Projects, Julie Saul Gallery, New York, New York
- 2014 – Maira Kalman: My Favorite Things, The Cooper Hewitt National Design Museum, New York, NY
- 2014 – The Elements of Style, The Frist Center for the Visual Arts, Nashville, TN
- 2014 – Thomas Jefferson Life, Liberty and the Pursuit of Everything, Monticello, Charlottesville, VA
- 2015 – Sara Berman's Closet, Mmuseumm, New York City, New York
- 2017 – Sara Berman's Closet, in collaboration with Alex Kalman, The Metropolitan Museum of Art, New York City, New York
- 2019 – The Pursuit of Everything: Maira Kalman's Books for Children, The High Museum of Art, Atlanta, Georgia
- 2022 – Women Holding Things, Mary Ryan Gallery, New York City

== Personal life ==
Maira Kalman married designer Tibor Kalman in 1981. Over the course of their marriage, Maira and Tibor had two children, Lulu Bodoni and Alexander Onomatopoeia. They were married eighteen years until Tibor's death from non-Hodgkin's lymphoma in 1999. Her children attended the City and Country School in Greenwich Village.

Kalman's mother, Sara Berman, was the early source to her inspiration behind storytelling and book reading. As a mother-daughter activity, Kalman and her mother would go to the library and connect themselves to the characters of the books they would read. In 2017, Kalman and her son Alexander got together with coordinators of The Metropolitan Museum of Art and created an exhibit dedicated to Kalman's mother called "Sara Berman's Closet." Sara Berman's Closet also became a memoir that Kalman and her son worked on in dedication to their loved family member.

In 2014, Kalman has also performed in a production of Peter & the Wolf directed by Isaac Mizrahi at the Guggenheim's Peter B. Lewis Theater in New York City. Kalman's character is the duck, which is represented by the sound of an oboe.

Kalman lives in Greenwich Village in New York City.

== Bibliography ==
- Hey Willy, See the Pyramids (1988) Viking/Penguin ISBN 978-0-14-050840-6
- Sayonara, Mrs. Kackleman (1989) Viking Kestrel/Penguin ISBN 0-670-82945-5
- Max Makes a Million (1990) Viking/Penguin ISBN 978-0-670-83545-4
- Roarr, Calder's Circus (1991) Delacorte Press/Bantam Dell/Random House ISBN 978-0-385-30916-5
- Max In Hollywood, Baby (1992) Viking/Penguin ISBN 978-0-670-84479-1
- Chicken Soup, Boots (1993) Viking/Penguin ISBN 978-0-670-85201-7
- Ooh-la-la, Max in Love (1994) Viking/Penguin ISBN 978-0-14-055537-0
- Swami on Rye: Max in India (1995) Viking/Penguin ISBN 978-0-670-85646-6
- Max Deluxe (1996) Viking/Penguin ISBN 978-0-670-86837-7
- Next Stop Grand Central (1999) Putnam/Penguin ISBN 978-0-399-22926-8
- (un)Fashion (with her husband Tibor Kalman) (2005) Harry N. Abrams ISBN 978-0-8109-9229-0
- What Pete Ate From A to Z (2001) Putnam/Penguin ISBN 978-0-14-250159-7
- Fireboat: The Heroic Adventures of the John J. Harvey (2002) Putnam/Penguin ISBN 978-0-399-23953-3
- Colors: Tibor Kalman, Issues 1–13 (with her husband Tibor Kalman) (2002) ISBN 0-8109-0414-4
- Smartypants (Pete In School) ISBN 0-399-23478-0
- The Illustrated Elements of Style (with William Strunk, Jr. and E. B. White) (2008) Penguin ISBN 978-0-14-311272-3
- The Principles of Uncertainty (2009) Penguin Press ISBN 978-1-59420-134-9
- Various Illuminations (of a Crazy World) (2010) DelMonico Prestel München 2010 ISBN 978-3-7913-5035-6
- 13 words (2010) by Lemony Snicket HarperCollins Children's Books ISBN 9780061664656
- And the Pursuit of Happiness (2010) Penguin Press ISBN 978-1594202674
- Food Rules (2011) by Michael Pollan Penguin Group ISBN 9781594203084
- Looking at Lincoln (2012) Nancy Paulsen Books, a division of Penguin Young Readers Group ISBN 9780147517982
- Girls Standing on Lawns (2014) by Daniel Handler Abrams Books for Young Readers ISBN 978-0-870-70908-1
- My Favorite Things (2014) with the Cooper-Hewitt Museum, Harper Design, an imprint of HarperCollins Publishers ISBN 9780062122971
- Thomas Jefferson: Life, Liberty and the Pursuit of Everything (2014) Nancy Paulsen Books, an imprint of Penguin Group ISBN 978-0-399-24040-9
- Beloved Dog (2015) Penguin Press ISBN 9781594205941
- Hurry Up and Wait (2015) by Daniel Handler Museum of Modern Art, New York ISBN 978-0870709593
- Weather, Weather (2016) by Daniel Handler Museum of Modern Art, New York ISBN 978-1633450141
- Cake (with Barbara Scott-Goodman) (2018) Penguin Press ISBN 9781101981542
- Swami on Rye: Max in India NYR Children's Collection, 2018
- Rembrandt's Polish Rider (with Xavier F. Salomon) (The Frick Collection, 2019)
