= Rip Torn =

American actor (1931–2019)

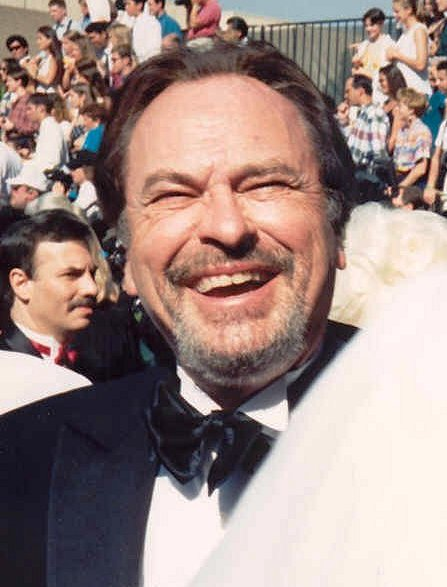
- Rip Torn in 1994
- Born: Elmore Rual Torn Jr. February 6, 1931; Temple, Texas, U.S.
- Died: July 9, 2019 (aged 88); Lakeville, Connecticut, U.S.
- Burial place: Poughkeepsie Rural Cemetery
- Occupation: Actor
- Years active: 1956–2019
- Spouses: Ann Wedgeworth (m. 1955; div. 1961) Geraldine Page (m. 1963; died 1987) Amy Wright (m. 1989)
- Children: 6, including Angelica Page and Tony Torn
- Relatives: Sissy Spacek (cousin); David Torn (cousin)

Elmore Rual "Rip" Torn Jr. (February 6, 1931 – July 9, 2019) was an American actor whose career spanned roughly 60 years. He was nominated for the Academy Award for Best Supporting Actor for playing Marsh Turner in Cross Creek (1983). Torn's portrayal of Artie the producer on The Larry Sanders Show (1992–1998) received six Emmy Award nominations, winning in 1996. He played the lead roles in films Coming Apart (1969), Payday (1973), and Heartland (1979).

Torn was best known for his roles as Judas Iscariot in King of Kings (1961), Thomas J. Finley, Jr. in Sweet Bird of Youth (1962), Dr. Nathan Bryce in The Man Who Fell to Earth (1976), Maax in The Beastmaster (1982), Bob Diamond in Defending Your Life (1991), Zeus in Hercules (1997), Zed in the Men in Black franchise (1997, 2002), Jim Brody in Freddy Got Fingered (2001), Patches O'Houlihan in Dodgeball: A True Underdog Story (2004), and Louis XV in Marie Antoinette (2006).

== Early life ==
Elmore Rual Torn Jr. was born on February 6, 1931, in Temple, Texas, the son of Elmore Rual "Tiger" Torn Sr., and Thelma Mary Torn (née Spacek). The senior Elmore was an agriculturalist and economist who worked to promote the consumption of black-eyed peas, particularly as a custom on New Year's Day. Thelma was an aunt of actress Sissy Spacek. The family is of German, Austrian, and Czech/Moravian ancestry. The nickname "Rip" is a family tradition among men in the Torn family, having been used by his father, uncle, and a cousin. Torn graduated from Taylor High School in Taylor, Texas, in 1948.

Torn was a member of the Texas A&M University Corps of Cadets, although he graduated from the University of Texas, where he studied acting under the Shakespeare professor B. Iden Payne. and was a member of the Alpha Nu chapter of the Sigma Chi fraternity. After graduation, he served in the Korean War with the 2nd Infantry Division with the military police in the United States Army.

== Career ==
=== Film and television ===
After moving to Hollywood, Torn made his film debut in the 1956 film Baby Doll. He then studied at the Actors Studio in New York under Lee Strasberg, becoming a prolific stage actor, appearing in the original cast of Tennessee Williams' play Sweet Bird of Youth, and reprising the role in the film and television adaptations. Torn later helped his younger cousin Sissy Spacek enroll in the Actors Studio. He also appeared in the first production of his friend James Baldwin's Blues for Mister Charlie. Along with Baldwin and numerous mutual friends he was active in the Civil Rights movement from the '50s forward, as Baldwin's biographer David Leeming relates.

One of Torn's earliest roles was in Pork Chop Hill, portraying the brother-in-law of Gregory Peck's character. He also had an uncredited role in A Face in the Crowd as Barry Mills. In 1957, Torn portrayed Jody in an early episode of The Restless Gun. In 1957, he starred as incarcerated Steve Morgan in the Alfred Hitchcock Presents episode "Number Twenty-Two", and on the same series in 1961, he played a recently released prisoner, Ernie Walters, in the Alfred Hitchcock Presents episode "The Kiss-Off". After portraying Judas, betrayer of Jesus, in 1961 epic film King of Kings, Torn appeared in the February 7, 1962, episode of the acclaimed TV series The Naked City, "A Case Study of Two Savages", adapted from the real-life case of backwood killers Charles Starkweather (played by Torn) and Ora Mae Youngham, (played by Tuesday Weld), Starkweather's young bride, who were on a homicidal spree starting in Appalacia and ending in New York City. He played a graduate student with multiple degrees in 1963 television series Channing, and as Roy Kendall in the Breaking Point episode "Millions of Faces". More military roles followed, as a Marine drill instructor in an episode of The Lieutenant in 1963 and as a GI in an episode of Combat! the next year. In 1964, Torn appeared as Eddie Sanderson in the episode "The Secret in the Stone" in The Eleventh Hour and in the premiere of The Reporter. In 1965, in the film The Cincinnati Kid, he played Slade, a corrupt New Orleans millionaire, who pressures Steve McQueen during a high-stakes poker game. On television that year, Torn portrayed Colonel Royce in the episode "The Lorelei" of Twelve O'Clock High. Following these roles, he had turns as a character actor in numerous subsequent films. The part of George Hanson in Easy Rider was written for Torn by Terry Southern, but according to Southern's biographer Lee Hill, Torn withdrew from the project after co-director Dennis Hopper and he got into a bitter argument in a New York restaurant. Jack Nicholson was chosen to play Hanson instead, giving a performance that helped to launch his career.

In 1972, Torn won rave reviews for his portrayal of a country and western singer in the cult film Payday. He co-starred with singer David Bowie in the 1976 science-fiction film The Man Who Fell to Earth. He portrayed a Southern senator in 1979's The Seduction of Joe Tynan, opposite Alan Alda and Meryl Streep, and a music producer in Paul Simon's 1980 film One-Trick Pony.

In 1982, Torn played a role as a black magic cult leader in the sword-and-sorcery movie The Beastmaster. He also co-starred in Jinxed!, a comedy with Bette Midler, and appeared as an airline executive in Airplane II: The Sequel. He played a sheriff opposite Treat Williams and Kris Kristofferson in the 1984 thriller Flashpoint. Torn received an Academy Award nomination as Best Supporting Actor for his role in 1983's Cross Creek as a poor neighbor of Marjorie Kinnan Rawlings in the orange groves of Florida. He was nominated for the CableACE Award for his portrayal of Big Daddy in the 1984 Showtime production of Cat on a Hot Tin Roof. He co-starred with John Candy as a man who helps a tourist win a sailboat race in the 1985 comedy Summer Rental. He had a brief role as Sheriff Hank Pearson in Extreme Prejudice.

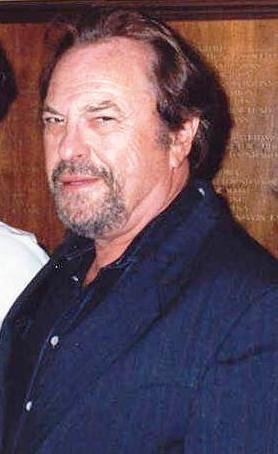
Torn in 1993

In 1988, he ventured into directing with The Telephone. The screenplay was written by Terry Southern and Harry Nilsson, and the film was produced by their company, Hawkeye. The story, which concerned an unhinged, out-of-work actor, had been written with Robin Williams in mind. After he turned it down, Whoopi Goldberg expressed a strong interest, but when production began, Torn reportedly had to contend with Goldberg constantly digressing and improvising, and he had to plead with her to perform takes that stuck to the script.

Goldberg was backed by the studio, which also allowed her to replace Torn's chosen DP, veteran cinematographer John A. Alonzo, with her husband. As a result of the power struggle, Torn, Southern, and Nilsson cut their own version of the film, using the takes that adhered to the script and this was screened at the Sundance Film Festival, but the studio put together a rival version using other takes and it was poorly reviewed when it premiered in January 1988.

In 1990, he portrayed Colonel Fargo in By Dawn's Early Light, a film from HBO about a fictional world war. In 1991, he portrayed Albert Brooks' character's celestial defense attorney in Defending Your Life. He played a jeweler who murders his own nephew in order to steal a winning lottery ticket in an episode of Columbo that year on TV, "Death Hits the Jackpot". In 1993, Torn portrayed the OCP CEO in RoboCop 3 and starred opposite Tantoo Cardinal in Where the Rivers Flow North. This is the same year that Torn played the owner of a fictional battery company in a series of Energizer commercials in which the owner of a rival battery company hires various fictional villains to assault the Energizer Bunny and eliminate the competition. He was a naval officer presiding over a wargame in the Kelsey Grammer submarine comedy Down Periscope in 1996.

In 1997, Torn appeared in the Disney film Hercules, in which he voiced the god Zeus. Torn played MIB agency boss Zed in the 1997 hit film Men in Black, starring Will Smith and Tommy Lee Jones, a role he reprised in the 2002 sequel Men in Black II. In 2001, Torn portrayed James "Jim" Brody in the comedy film Freddy Got Fingered. In 2004, he played the wrench-tossing coach Patches O'Houlihan in DodgeBall: A True Underdog Story.

=== Stage career ===
==== Broadway ====
Torn appeared in ten Broadway plays and directed one. In 1959, he made his feature Broadway debut when he played Tom Junior in Sweet Bird of Youth, for which he won a Theatre World Award and also received a Tony Award nomination.

He returned next in 1962 in the play Daughter of Silence as Carlo, following that with a role in the 1963 production of Strange Interlude. In 1964, he played Lyle Britten in Blues for Mister Charlie, and four years later, he was Roberto in The Cuban Thing for its only performance on September 24, 1968.

In 1971, he portrayed Edgar in Dance of Death, and directed his first Broadway play in 1973: Look Away. In 1975, he portrayed the Son in the Broadway revival of The Glass Menagerie and 5 years later, portrayed Don in Mixed Couples. For 13 years, Torn was absent from Broadway, but returned in 1993 to portray Chris Christopherson in Anna Christie. In his last Broadway appearance in 1997, Torn portrayed Will Kidder in The Young Man from Atlanta.

==== Off-Broadway ====
Torn made his feature off-Broadway acting debut as Eben Cabot in the play Desire Under the Elms, followed by Peter in The Kitchen at the 81st Street Theatre. His third off-Broadway role was Marion-Faye-A-Pimp in The Deer Park, for which he won the 1967 Obie Award for Distinguished Performance. He performed at the Lucille Lortel Theatre in the play Dream of a Blacklisted Actor, and later at the Joseph Papp Public Theater's Anspacher Theater as William McLeod in Barbary Shore. He last acted off-Broadway at the American Place Theatre as Henry Hackamore in Sam Shepard's 1979 play Seduced: a Play in Two Acts.

Torn's off-Broadway debut as director was for the Evergreen Theater with the play The Beard; he won the 1968 Obie for Distinguished Direction for that work. He next directed The Honest-to-God Schnozzia at the Gramercy Arts Theater, followed by August Strindberg's Creditors and The Stronger—in which he acted beside his wife at the time, Geraldine Page for the Joseph Papp Public Theater. Torn and Page also co-produced that production, and had previously presented the two plays along with Miss Julie at the off-off-Broadway Hudson Guild Theatre the year before.

=== The Larry Sanders Show ===
From 1992 to 1998, Torn portrayed Artie in The Larry Sanders Show. For his work, Torn received six consecutive Emmy Award nominations as Best Supporting Actor in a Comedy Series and won the award once (1996). Torn was the only actor in the series who won an Emmy Award for his work. Other than the Emmy nominations and win, he received two American Comedy Awards nominations for Funniest Male Performance in a Series, winning once, and two CableACE Awards for his work on the series.

=== Later career ===
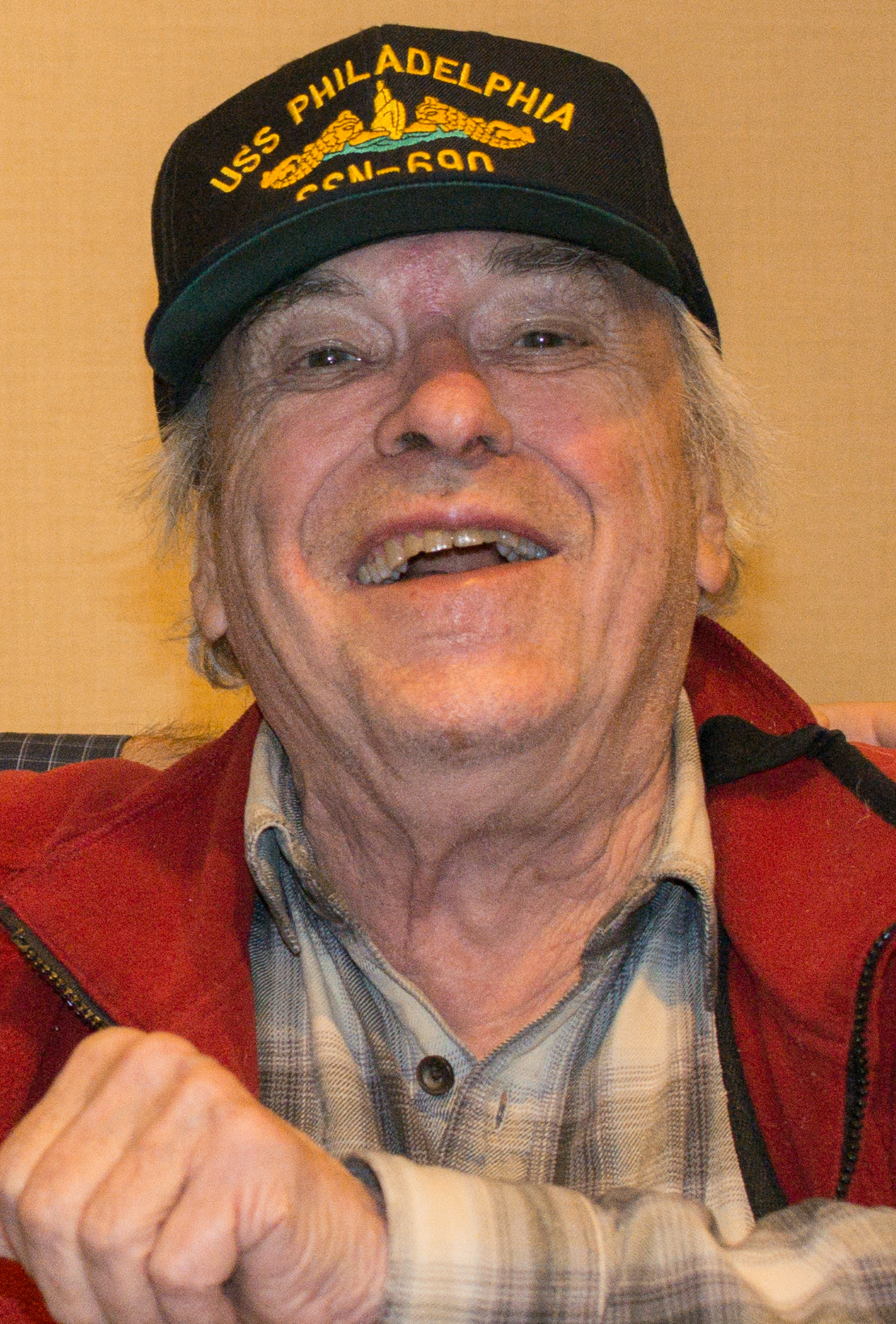
Torn attending the Chiller Theatre Expo in 2015

Following The Larry Sanders Show, Torn appeared in many comedic roles in films. He was also known for his voice work and did voice-overs for many animated films.

In 2007 and 2008, he made five guest appearances on 30 Rock as the fictional chief executive officer of General Electric, Don Geiss. He was nominated for an Emmy Award in the category for Outstanding Guest Actor in a Comedy Series, but lost to Tim Conway, who guest-starred in the same sitcom. Torn's character was reportedly killed off as a direct result of his 2010 arrest, though Tina Fey denied this in a DVD commentary. Torn voiced the character of Hephaestus in the 2010 video game God of War III.

Torn also appears in the music video for the They Might Be Giants song "Can't Keep Johnny Down", from their 2011 album Join Us.

In 2015, Torn reprised his role as Zed in a Men in Black-inspired safety video for Air New Zealand with rugby player Israel Dagg and singer Stan Walker.

== Personal life ==
=== Family ===
Torn was married three times, and had six children and four grandchildren.

His first marriage to actress Ann Wedgeworth lasted from 1956 to 1961. They had a daughter.

In 1963, Torn married Geraldine Page, and they remained married until her death in 1987. They had a daughter, Angelica Page, and twin sons, including Tony Torn. Torn apparently was delighted that the doorbell of their New York townhouse read Torn Page.

Torn married actress Amy Wright in 1989. They had two children.

=== Legal issues ===
On January 29, 2010, Torn was arrested after breaking into a Litchfield Bancorp branch office in Lakeville, Connecticut. He was charged with carrying a firearm without a permit, carrying a firearm while intoxicated, first-degree burglary, second-degree criminal trespassing, and third-degree criminal mischief. The Connecticut State Police said Torn, who lived in Lakeville, broke into the bank thinking it was his home. In court, his lawyer told the judge his client needed help with alcohol abuse and that he could start treatment immediately in New York. Torn was released on $100,000 bail.

As a condition of his release, Torn had to be evaluated for substance abuse. On August 11, 2010, Torn was denied special probation, which would have allowed his name to be cleared of charges. The judge in the case cited Torn's history of alcohol abuse and the possession of a loaded weapon while intoxicated, which carries a minimum one-year sentence. On December 14, 2010, Torn pleaded guilty to reckless endangerment, criminal trespass, criminal mischief, and possession of a firearm, and was given a two-and-a-half-year suspended jail sentence, and three years' probation.

=== On-set conflicts ===
Appearing as an interview subject in Studs Terkel's 1974 oral-history book Working, Torn confessed, "I have certain flaws in my make-up. Something called rise-ability. I get angry easily. I get saddened by things easily."

While filming Maidstone (1968), Torn struck director and star Norman Mailer in the head with a hammer. With the camera rolling, Mailer bit Torn's ear and they wrestled to the ground. The fight continued until it was broken up by cast and crew members. The fight is featured in the film. Although the scene may have been planned by Torn, the blood shed by both actors was real, and Torn was reportedly outraged by Mailer's direction.

In 1994, Torn filed a defamation lawsuit against Dennis Hopper over a story Hopper told on The Tonight Show with Jay Leno. Hopper claimed that Torn pulled a knife on him during pre-production of the film Easy Rider (1969). According to Hopper, Torn was originally cast in the film, but was replaced with Jack Nicholson after the incident. Torn claimed in his lawsuit that Hopper pulled the knife on him. A trial court judge ruled in Torn's favor and Hopper was ordered to pay $475,000 in compensatory damages, but he denied Torn's request for punitive damages, ruling Hopper had not acted with malice. Hopper appealed. On April 1, 1998, a California appellate court upheld the ruling for compensatory damages, and reversed the ruling for the punitive damages, requiring Hopper to pay another $475,000.

== Death ==
Torn died on July 9, 2019, at his home in Lakeville, Connecticut, at the age of 88 due to complications from Alzheimer's disease. He is buried at the Poughkeepsie Rural Cemetery in Poughkeepsie, New York.

== Filmography ==
=== Film ===
Year	Title	Role	Notes
1956	Baby Doll	The Dentist	Uncredited
1957	A Face in the Crowd	Barry Mills	Uncredited
1957	Time Limit	Lieutenant George Miller	
1959	Pork Chop Hill	Lieutenant Walter B. Russell	
1961	King of Kings	Judas Iscariot	
1962	Sweet Bird of Youth	Thomas J. Finley, Jr.	
1962	Hero's Island	Nicholas Gates	
1963	Critic's Choice	Dion Kapakos	
1965	The Cincinnati Kid	Slade	
1966	You're a Big Boy Now	I.H. Chanticleer	
1967	Beach Red	Sergeant Honeywell	
1968	Sol Madrid	Dano Villanova	
1969	Lions Love	THE BEARD Director	Uncredited
1969	Coming Apart	Joe	
1969	Tropic of Cancer	Henry Miller	
1970	Maidstone	Raoul Rey O'Houlihan	
1972	Slaughter	Dominic Hoffo	
1973	Payday	Maury Dann	
1974	Crazy Joe	Richie	
1976	The Man Who Fell to Earth	Dr. Nathan Bryce	
1976	Birch Interval	Thomas	
1977	Nasty Habits	Father Maximilian	
1977	The Private Files of J. Edgar Hoover	Dwight Webb	
1978	Coma	Dr. George	
1979	The Seduction of Joe Tynan	Senator Kittner	
1979	Heartland	Clyde Stewart	
1980	One Trick Pony	Walter Fox	
1980	First Family	General G. E. Dumpston	
1982	A Stranger Is Watching	Artie Taggart	
1982	The Beastmaster	Maax	
1982	Jinxed!	Harold Benson	
1982	Airplane II: The Sequel	Bud Kruger	
1983	Cross Creek	Marsh Turner	Nominated – Academy Award for Best Supporting Actor
1984	Misunderstood	Will	
1984	Flashpoint	Sheriff Wells	
1984	Songwriter	Dino McLeish	
1984	City Heat	Primo Pitt	
1985	Summer Rental	Scully	
1985	Beer	Buzz Beckerman	
1987	Extreme Prejudice	Sheriff Hank Pearson	
1987	Nadine	Bufford Pope	
1989	Hit List	Vic Luca	
1989	Cold Feet	Sheriff	
1989	Zwei Frauen	Dr. Steve Markowitz	
1990	Beautiful Dreamers	Walt Whitman	
1991	Defending Your Life	Bob Diamond	
1992	Dolly Dearest	Karl Resnick	
1992	Beyond the Law	Deputy Butch Prescott	
1992	Fires of Kuwait	Narrator	Documentary
1993	RoboCop 3	OCP CEO	
1993	Where the Rivers Flow North	Noel Lord	
1995	For Better or Worse	Captain Cole	
1995	Canadian Bacon	General Dick Panzer	
1995	How to Make an American Quilt	Arthur	
1996	Down Periscope	Vice Admiral Dean Winslow	
1997	Trial and Error	Benny Gibbs	
1997	Hercules	Zeus (voice)	
1997	Men in Black	Zed	Nominated – Satellite Award for Best Supporting Actor – Motion Picture
1998	Senseless	Randall Tyson	
1999	The Insider	John Scanlon	
2000	Wonder Boys	Quentin "Q" Morewood	
2001	Freddy Got Fingered	Jim Brody	Nominated – Golden Raspberry Award for Worst Supporting Actor
2002	Men in Black II	Zed	
2003	Rolling Kansas	Oldman	
2003	Love Object	Novak	
2004	Welcome to Mooseport	Bert Langdon	
2004	DodgeBall: A True Underdog Story	Patches O'Houlihan	
2004	Eulogy	Edmund Collins	
2005	Forty Shades of Blue	Alan James	
2005	The Sisters	Dr. Chebrin	
2005	Yours, Mine & Ours	Commandant Sherman	
2006	Marie Antoinette	Louis XV	
2006	Zoom	Larraby	
2007	Turn the River	Teddy Quinette	
2007	Bee Movie	Lou Lo Duca (voice)	
2007	Three Days to Vegas	Joe Wallace	
2008	August	David Sterling	
2008	The Golden Boys	Captain Jeremiah "Jerry" Burgess	
2009	Happy Tears	Joe	
2009	American Cowslip	Trevor O'Hart	
2009	The Afterlight	Carl	
2011	The Legend of Awesomest Maximus	King Looney	
2011	3 Weeks to Daytona	Sal	
2012	Bridge of Names	Tom	

=== Television ===
Year	Title	Role	Notes
1956	The Alcoa Hour	Kino	Episode: "The Big Wave"
1957	Alfred Hitchcock Presents	Steve Morgan #22	Episode: "Number Twenty-Two"
1957	The Restless Gun	Jody	Episode: "Jody"
1960	Thriller	Duncan Corey	Episode: "The Purple Room"
1961	The Untouchables	Pittsburgh Phil	Episode: "The Masterpiece"
1961	Alfred Hitchcock Presents	Ernie Walters	Episode: "The Kiss-Off"
1962	Naked City	Ansel Boake	Episode: "A Case of Two Savages"
1962	Dr. Kildare	Dr. Nicholas Keefe	Episode: "The Chemistry of Anger"
1963	The Lieutenant	Gunnery Sergeant Karl Kasten	Episode: "The Proud and the Angry"
1963	The Untouchables	Johnny Mizo	Episode: "The Spoiler"
1964	Combat!	Sergeant Avery	Episode: "A Gift of Hope"
1964	Dr. Kildare	John Burroughs	Episode: "An Exchange of Gifts"
1965	The Man from U.N.C.L.E.	Mr. Alexander	2 episodes
1965	Rawhide	Chiricahua Chief Jacob Yellow-Sun	Episode: "Escort to Doom"
1965	12 O'Clock High	Colonel Royce	Episode: "The Lorelei"
1971	Bonanza	Will Hewitt	Episode: "Blind Hunch"
1972	Mannix	Victor Roarke	Episode: "The Open Web"
1973	The President's Plane Is Missing	George Oldenburg	Television film
1978	Steel Cowboy	K.W. Hicks	Television film
1978	The Eddie Capra Mysteries	Andy Kilraine	Episode: "The Intimate Friends of Janet Wilde"
1978	Rape and Marriage: The Rideout Case	Charles Burt	Television film
1979	Blind Ambition	Richard Nixon	4 episodes
1980	Sophia Loren: Her Own Story	Carlo Ponti	Television film
1982	The Blue and the Gray	General Ulysses S. Grant	3 episodes
1984	Cat on a Hot Tin Roof	Big Daddy	Showtime production Nominated for CableACE Award for Actor in a Theatrical or Dramatic Special
1985	The Atlanta Child Murders	Lewis Slaton	2 episodes
1986	Dream West	Kit Carson	2 episodes
1987	Laguna Heat	Joe Datilla	Television film
1988	April Morning	Solomon Chandler	Television film
1989	Sweet Bird of Youth	Boss Finley	Television film
1990	By Dawn's Early Light	Colonel Fargo	Television film
1991	Columbo	Leon Lamarr	Episode: "Death Hits the Jackpot"
1991	Another Pair of Aces: Three of a Kind	Captain Jack Parsons	Television film
1992	Dead Ahead: The Exxon Valdez Disaster	Admiral Paul Yost	Television film
1992–1998	The Larry Sanders Show	Artie	89 episodes
1993	Maniac Magee	George McNab	Television film
1994	Heaven and Hell: North and South Book III	Adolphus	3 episodes
1995	Letter to My Killer	Russel Vanik	Television film
1997–1998	Ghost Stories	Narrator	44 episodes
1999	Passing Glory	Father Robert Grant	Television film
1999	Balloon Farm	Harvey H. Potter	Television film
2002	Maniac Magee	George McNab	Television film
2002	Will & Grace	Lionel Banks	4 episodes
2006	Law & Order: Criminal Intent	Jules Copeland	Episode: "Bedfellows"
2007–2009	30 Rock	Don Geiss	7 episodes
2016	TripTank	M (voice)	Episode: "#InsideRoy"

=== Video games ===
Year	Title	Voice role	Notes	Source
1997	Hercules	Zeus		
1998	Disney's Animated Storybook: Hercules	Zeus		
2010	God of War III	Hephaestus		
Unreleased	Shadow Stalkers	The Producer		
