= Jan Middendorp =

Dutch typographer and author (1956–2023)

Jan Middendorp (April 9, 1956 – December 8, 2023) was a Dutch typographer, editor and author. He wrote Dutch Type, a widely acclaimed 2004 book about typeface design in the Netherlands, and contributed to graphic design magazines including Eye, Items and Typo. Middendorp received the 2023 TDC Medal and was inducted into Art Directors Club Creative Hall of Fame for his achievements.

Born in The Hague in 1956, Middendorp studied theory of literature and theatre and worked as a performing arts critic before beginning a career as a self-taught graphic designer in 1980s. In 1999–2002, he lived in Ghent where he edited and designed Druk, a quarterly magazine published by the Benelux branch of FontShop type foundry. After moving to Berlin in 2005, Middendorp edited several reference books and contributed writing to MyFonts, Linotype and LucasFonts type foundries as a freelance editor. He died December 8, 2023 in Berlin at the age of 67.

== Books ==
- Dutch Type, 2004
- Made with FontFont: Type for Independent Minds, 2007, co-authored with Erik Spiekermann
- Type Navigator, The Independent Foundries Handbook, 2011
- Hand to Type, 2012
- Shaping Text, 2012
- Dutch Type: 2004 Edition Reprint, 2018
