= Broderick Adé Hogue =

American art director, designer, and letterer (1989–2021)

- Born: March 22, 1989; Halifax, Virginia
- Died: October 29, 2021 (aged 32); Chicago, Illinois

Broderick Adé Hogue (March 22, 1989 – October 29, 2021) was an American art director, designer, and letterer. Type Directors Club's annual Adé Hogue Scholarship, awarded to BIPOC students demonstrating exellency in typography, was named in his honor.

== Early life and education ==
Hogue was born on March 22, 1989, in Halifax, Virginia. He attended the University of North Carolina at Charlotte (UNCC), starting as an engineering major. After "stumbling" into a drawing class, he fell in love with art and eventually graduated with a BFA in Graphic Design in 2012. He was named as the 2018 Distinguished Alumnus in the Department of Art & Art History at UNCC.

== Career ==
Hogue moved to Chicago after earning his BFA. In 2013 he started a daily lettering project that eventually led to career as a freelance letterer. In 2017, he was recognized in Print magazine's 15 Artists Under 30 issue.

Hogue worked for major clients including Nike, Target, Netflix, Under Armour, ESPN, and Alaska Airlines. He spoke about design and lettering at CreativeMornings, Adobe MAX, and a number of AIGA events. He taught lettering as an adjunct instructor at DePaul University.

In 2020, Jessica Hische approached Hogue to collaborate on the "Rise Up, Show Up, Unite" social media design campaign for the Biden/Harris Campaign. The project included contributions from artists including Lisa Congdon, Michael Bierut, Aaron Draplin, Debbie Millman, and Mike Perry.

== Death ==
On October 27, 2021, Hogue was riding a bike in the Near North Side of Chicago when he was struck by a van driver. He was hospitalized in intensive care and died on October 29 at Northwestern Memorial Hospital.

== Legacy ==
In February 2022, the Type Directors Club renamed their "Superscript" scholarship to the Adé Hogue Scholarship. The scholarship is a $5,000 award to an outstanding junior college or first-year graduate degree BIPOC student demonstrating exceptional talent and promise in the design and creation of letterforms.
