= Gail Anderson (graphic designer) =

American graphic designer

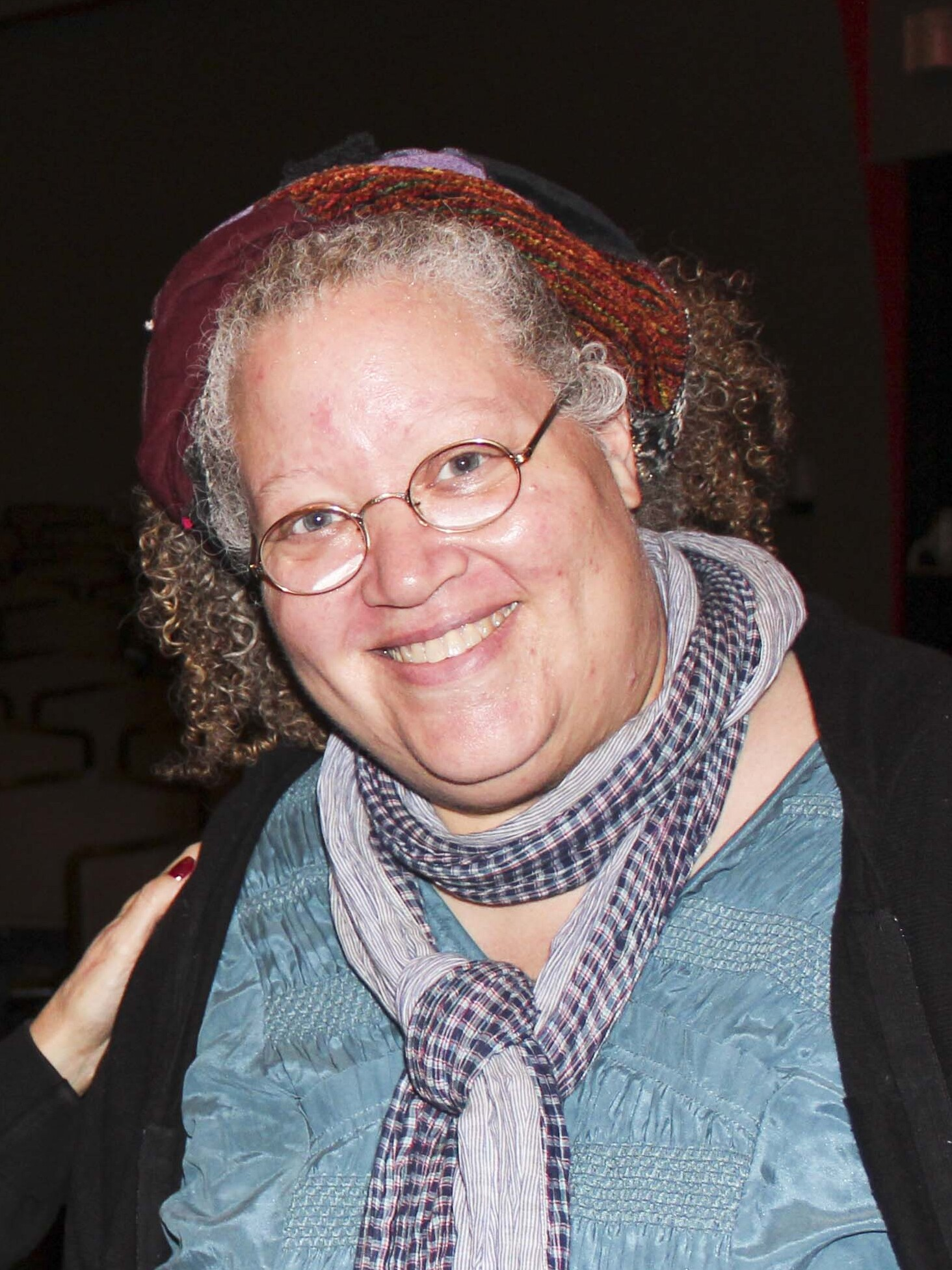
- Anderson in 2012
- Born: 1962 (age 63–64); Bronx, New York, United States
- Education: School of Visual Arts (BFA 1984)
- Known for: Graphic design
- Awards: AIGA medal (2008)
- Website: www.gailycurl.com

Gail Anderson (born 1962) is an American graphic designer, writer, and educator known for her typographic skill, hand-lettering and poster design.

== Biography ==
=== Early life and education ===
Gail Anderson's family migrated to the Bronx, New York, from Jamaica. She was the first-generation American, and first-generation college-educated in her family. In her youth, Anderson created Jackson 5 and Partridge Family pretend magazines. As she got older, she began to look into what was then called “commercial art” as a possible career field.

She graduated from the School of Visual Arts with a BFA in 1984, where she was taught by Paula Scher. She joined the faculty at School of Visual Arts MFA, undergraduate, and high school design programs, and has served on the advisory boards for Adobe Partners by Design and the Society of Publication Designers. She currently serves on the board for the Type Directors Club, and is a member of the Citizens' Stamp Advisory Committee for the US Postal Service.

=== Career ===
Upon graduating, Anderson worked as a designer at Vintage Books (Random House) and then at The Boston Globe Sunday Magazine from 1985 to 1987. She became the senior art director of Rolling Stone, where she worked for fifteen years from 1987 to 2002, starting as a designer and deputy art director. In 2002, she became the creative director at SpotCo, an agency specializing in advertising for the arts and entertainment, where she stayed until 2010. Her first piece for Spotco was a subway poster for the play Harlem Song. Anderson was also in charge of the typeface library at SpotCo. She is currently a partner at Anderson Newton Design with Joe Newton.

She specializes in creating theatrical advertising for Broadway productions. Her work, which has received awards from the Society of Publication Designers, the Type Directors Club, AIGA, the Art Directors Club, Graphic, Communication Arts and Print, is in the permanent collections of the Cooper-Hewitt, National Design Museum, and the Library of Congress.

Anderson designed the 2013 Emancipation Proclamation US postage stamp.

Working with Steven Heller for over twenty years, she has co-written books on graphic design including New Modernist Type, New Ornamental Type, New Vintage Type, Astounding Photoshop Effects, American Type Play, The Savage Mirror, Graphic Wit, and the upcoming The Typographic Universe. Anderson is a contributor to magazines Imprint and Uppercase.

Her philosophy for type design is that "the process has to be fun and you need to be willing to step outside your comfort zone."

Anderson is a faculty member at the School of Visual Arts in the Designer as Author MFA department, where she also teaches graduate, undergraduate, and pre-college courses in graphic design.

She was among AIGA's 2008 medalists for her accomplishments in graphic design. She serves on the advisory board for the Adobe Design Achievement Awards. Anderson served as the Director-At-Large for the Type Directors Club from 2014 to 2016.

Currently based in New York City, Anderson teaches in the School of Visual Arts MFA, undergraduate, and high school design programs, and serves as creative director at the school's Visual Arts Press, the in-house design studio for the School. She is partner at Anderson Newton Design, serves on the board for the Type Directors Club, and is a member of the Citizens' Stamp Advisory Committee for the US Postal Service.

Her career has ranged from magazine design to teaching, designing for the theater, packaging, writing, and now designing for academia. Anderson's work has received many awards from major design organizations, including the Society of Publication Designers, the Type Directors Club, The American Institute of Graphic Arts, The Art Directors Club, Graphis, Communication Arts, and Print. In addition, her work has also been included in the permanent collections of the Cooper Hewitt Design Museum, the Library of Congress, and the Milton Glaser Design Archives at the School of Visual Arts. Anderson has been featured in magazines that include Computer Arts (UK), designNET (Korea), kAk (Russia), STEP Inside Design, and Graphic Design USA. In 2018 Gail Anderson was honored with The National Design Awards’ Lifetime Achievement Accolade, the first year that women of color were awarded.

=== Work style ===
Anderson has always been passionate about type. She is obsessed with the element of type and finds ways to improve her skill. Anderson uses a variety of traditional and non-traditional forms of type in her work, including incorporating wood type or found objects. Anderson developed her type style and incorporates it into commercial fonts, lettering, old advertising posters, vintage signage, pages from antique specimen books. All of this sparks her impassioned typographic emotions. Anderson now has focused her career in creating artwork and campaigns for Broadway theater. She is also specializing in hand-lettering and packaging design. She has published her findings in the book called Hand-Drawn Packaging from Around the World. The book contributes to the documentation of Anderson's talent and graphic design skills. It has won the best illustrated award-winning design.

== Notable works ==
Gail Anderson has a wide area of expertise working in multiple areas of the graphic design field throughout her career. Some of her most notable works stem from her experience creating posters in the entertainment industry while working with The School of Visual Arts, Rolling Stone, and many theater organizations – including Broadway.

=== Theater ===
On Broadway:

- Avenue Q
- Man of La Mancha

At the Guthrie Theater:

- Peer Gynt

=== Publications ===
For Rolling Stone:

- Alicia Keys
- Axl Rose

=== Posters ===
School of Visual Arts:

- SVA Subway Poster

Type Directors Club:

- Wanted

== Books and publications ==
- Outside the Box. New York: Princeton Architectural Press. 2015. ISBN 978-1616893361.

Anderson has collaborated with Steven Heller on multiple books.

- American Typeplay. New York: PBC International. 1994. ISBN 9780866361941.
- The Designer's Guide to Astounding Photoshop Effects. New York: HOW Books. 2004. ISBN 9781581805000.
- Graphic Wit: The Art of Humor in Design. New York: Watson-Guptill. 1991. ISBN 9780823021611.
- New Modernist Type. New York: Thames & Hudson. 2012. ISBN 9780500241417.
- New Ornamental Type: Decorative Lettering in the Digital Age. New York: Thames & Hudson. 2010. ISBN 9780500515020.
- New Vintage Type: Classic Fonts for the Digital Age. London: Thames & Hudson. 2009. ISBN 9780500288184.
- Heller, Steven; Anderson, Gail (1992). The Savage Mirror: The Art of Contemporary Caricature. New York. ISBN 9780823046447.
- Heller, Steven; Anderson, Gail (2014). Typographic Universe. London. ISBN 9780500241455.

== Awards ==
- 2008 AIGA Lifetime Achievement Medal
- 2009 Richard Gangel Art Director Award
- 2018 Cooper Hewitt National Design Awards, Lifetime Achievement
