= New Yorkistan =

Cover Art for The New Yorker magazine, December 10, 2001

The "New Yorkistan" cover of The New Yorker

"New Yorkistan" is the title of the cover art for the December 10, 2001 edition of The New Yorker magazine. Inspired by a conversation while driving through the Bronx, it was created by Maira Kalman and Rick Meyerowitz who did the actual painting, and is (according to the American Society of Magazine Editors) #14 on the list of the top 40 magazine covers of the past 40 years. It depicts the boroughs of New York City, as well as individual neighborhoods within the city, giving each a humorous name (a "funny mixture of Yiddish, Persian, and New Yorkisms") based on the history or geography of that area of the city, while playfully using names or suffixes common in the Middle East and Central Asia, such as "-stan". Thus the title, "New Yorkistan".

The cover gained unexpected popularity, with the New Yorker making approximately $400,000 by February 2002 by selling copies of the picture as signed lithographs (all 750 copies of which sold out within 4 days) and unsigned posters.

According to Kalman, the inspiration for the cover arose in a car on the way to a party. She and Meyerowitz were talking about tribalism. At one point she came up with the idea of "Bronxistan", to which Meyerowitz replied "You know, we've got a map here." Originally, the picture was to be run on the back page of the magazine, but editors liked it so much that it was decided to make it the cover picture.

Susan Jarratt describes the cover as "lampooning both New Yorkers' city-bound geographic consciousness and a nationwide ignorance of the geography of Central Asia". Jarratt notes that it was one of the first "humorous interventions" since the events of September 11, 2001. Urschel notes that this timing of the cover's publication was fortunate. Kalman herself commented on the timing, saying that "if [the cover had come] out earlier, many would have been infuriated, and if it [had come] out later, no one would have cared."

In September, 2004, Meyerowitz and Kalman made a New York City Subway map as a food map, the New York City Sub-Culinary Map, for The New Yorker.

== Place names ==
The places depicted, with their explanations (according to the artists or to commentators), are as follows:

Al Quarantine
Rikers Island, a large jail complex
Al Zheimers
Alzheimer's disease
Artsifarsis
Situated in the Theater District, this is a play on the term "artsy-fartsy", as well as a reference to the Farsi language, which is a language used officially within Iran, Afghanistan and Tajikistan.
Bad
Badassin
Blahniks
The Upper East Side where "everyone can afford Manolo Blahnik shoes"
Botoxia
Botox
Bronxistan
The Bronx
Bulimikhs
Bulimics
Central Parkistan
Central Park, Manhattan
Chadorstore
Jersey City, home of a Muslim community where women wear a chador. Also a pun on The Door Store, a well-known New York furniture store.
Cold Turkeystan
E-Z Pashtuns
E-ZPass, an electronic toll collection system, as well as the Pashtun ethnic group
Extra Stan
Fashtoonks
From a Yiddish adjective meaning "stinking, smelly" describing the sometime aromas of the New Jersey industrial wastelands just beyond the Palisades along the Hudson River.
Fattushis
There is a popular Middle Eastern Restaurant in that part of Brooklyn called Fattoosh
Feh and Ptooey
Yiddish expressions of negativity ("feh!", "ptooey!") for a part of The Bronx that is considered dangerous.
Flatbushtuns
Flatbush, Brooklyn
Fuhgeddabouditstan
This is in Brooklyn, where this place name sounds like the local pronunciation of the popular local expression "Forget about it."
Gadzhooks
Gaymenistan
The neighborhood of Chelsea, currently a very "gay" part of Manhattan. Also a play on Turkmenistan.
Gribinez
The Hudson River. "gribenes" (conventional Yiddish-English transliteration) is an Eastern European Jewish delicacy, "cracklings from rendered chicken fat"
Halibutz
Halibut
Harry Van Arsdale, Jr., Blvd.
This is the actual name of the road depicted and is the only real name on the map. According to Meyerowitz, the reason is simply that the name is inherently funny: "The name never failed to make me laugh when I approached it."
Hiphopabad
Hip hop with -abad nameplace ending. This overlaps roughly with Bedford-Stuyvesant, the most heavily African-American neighborhood in Brooklyn.
Irant and Irate
A reference to ranting and being irate, as well as to Iran and Iraq.
Khaffeine
... (Also note the jagged lines marking the territory, a reference to the effects of caffeine.)
(Conn.) Khakis
Southwestern Connecticut, a wealthy area that could be considered a stronghold of WASP culture and the article of clothing often associated with them.
Khandibar
A pun on candy bar and Kandahar.
Khantstandit
"Can't stand it"
Kharkeez
This is in southern Connecticut, with the translation being "car keys", a reference to the many NY workers who commute to the city from Connecticut.
Khkhzks
Khlintunisia
This is in Harlem, Manhattan, the "Khlintun" part being a reference to President Clinton's office location in Harlem. Also, "Tunisia" is a primarily Islamic/Arab country in northern Africa.
Khouks
Khurz
Curs and Kurds
Kvetchnya
A pun on Chechnya and "kvetch".
Le Frakhis
LeFrak City, a housing complex in Queens
Lesbikhs
Liberaci
Presumably referring to Morningside Heights, neighborhood of Columbia University, a primarily "liberal" institution.
Lowrentistan
World Trade Center site
Lubavistan
Named after the Lubavitch branch of Hasidic Jews, most of whom live in Brooklyn.
Moolahs
Wall Street and the Financial District of Manhattan. "moolah" is a common slang term for money and also probably alludes to "mullah".
Mooshuhadeen
Combination of 'mujahideen' and 'moo-shu', referring respectively to the Arabic term for those involved in a struggle ("jihad") and to Chinatown and 'moo-shu' dishes in Chinese-American cuisine.
Muzaks
Mutterers
Notsobad
The one area of the Bronx that is not considered dangerous to go to
Nudniks
Yiddish for someone who is a pestering or irritating person. The New York Mets.
Outer Perturbia
Pashmina
A pashmina is a Kashmiri shawl often made of cashmere. This is in an affluent area of the city, where women can afford cashmere and may be drawn to the stylish use of pashminas.
Perturbia
Psychobabylon
Psychobabble
Schmattahadeen
shmatta is Yiddish for "rag", also jocular for clothing in the fashion industry.
Shatoosh
Shatoosh is a type of fine Kashmiri shawl made of antelope down hairs. It is located in the center of an affluent are of the city, where women can afford such a luxurious shawl.
Snit
Soporifiks
Spit
Stan
This is Staten Island, which is just plain "Stan" because of its nondescript nature. It could also be interpreted as the name of the camel standing there.
Taxistan
This is the location of LaGuardia Airport in Queens, with its large contingent of taxis waiting for arriving passengers.
The Potatoes
These islands (2 are North and South Brother Islands) are shaped much like potatoes, at least in the drawing.
Trumpistan
an "area of future development", presumably by then-real estate developer and Apprentice star Donald Trump.
Turban Sprawl
urban sprawl
Unmitigated Gauls
Upper Kvetchnya
Kvetch is Yiddish for "complain".
Veryverybad
Wretched Kurz
Yhanks
This is the South Bronx, home of the New York Yankees and Yankee Stadium.
Youdontunderstandistan

== See also ==
- List of named ethnic enclaves in North American cities
- Saul Steinberg. (1976) "View of the World from 9th Avenue", cover for The New Yorker has been compared to this illustration.
