= Paul Standard =

American calligrapher

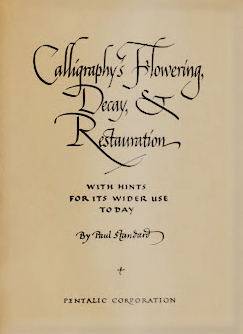
- Book plate
- Born: May 19, 1896; Russia
- Died: January 1, 1992 (aged 95); United States
- Citizenship: American
- Occupation(s): Calligrapher and author
- Spouse: Stella Standard

Paul Standard (May 19, 1896 – January 1, 1992) was an American calligrapher and author, who immigrated from Russia in 1903.

Standard taught at Cooper Union, New York University, and Parsons School of Design; edited the Associated Press; and was a publicist for the Canadian Pacific Railway. He published three books: Calligraphy’s Flowering, Decay and Restoration (1947, Society of Typographic Arts), Our Handwriting (1947), and Arrighi's Running Hand (1979). In 1983, he received the TDC Medal from the Type Directors Club.

He was married and lived in Manhattan during the 1960s.
