= M & Co. (design firm) =

American design firm

M & Co. was a graphic and product design firm located in New York City. Founded in 1979 by Tibor Kalman, Carol Bokuniewicz and Liz Trovato, M&Co. was dissolved after Tibor Kalman's death in 1999. Their designs are described by the Cooper-Hewitt, National Design Museum as being "imaginative and witty."

== History ==
Tibor Kalman founded M & Co. with founding partners Carol Bokuniewicz and Liz Trovato in 1979. Despite studying journalism, he channeled his interest in typography and design to start M & Co. The company employed the likes of Stephen Doyle, Emily Oberman, Alexander Isley, Bethany Johns, Marlene McCarty, and Scott Stowell. Kalman's wife, Maira, referred to as “the 'M' in M&Co” was heavily involved in the organization and was a collaborator for many projects. Artist Stefan Sagmeister joined M & Co. in 1993 after returning to New York from Hong Kong, fulfilling a long‑held ambition to work with Kalman before the studio closed later that year when Kalman left the design business to edit Colors magazine.

== Projects ==
Major projects for M & Co. focused around stationery, ID systems, and media artwork, such as album covers. M & Co. also developed their own brand of watches and paperweights. They worked for clients such as: China Grill Management, Hannibal Records, Swatch, NYNEX, Benetton, and the Audubon Society. The company has also designed opening sequences for films such as The Silence of the Lambs, Something Wild, and True Stories.

== Legacy ==
Works created by M & Co. are held in the collection of the Cooper-Hewitt, National Design Museum and the Museum of Modern Art.
