= Fabrica research centre =

Communications research centre in Treviso, Italy

Fabrica (est. 1994) is a communications research centre in Treviso, Italy, financed by the Benetton Group. It produces Colors magazine amongst other projects.

The centre aims to combine culture with industry and offers young people the opportunity for creative growth and multicultural, multidisciplinary interchange. The centre is housed in a 17th-century villa near Villorba, restored and significantly enlarged by architect Tadao Ando. It was originally under the guidance of Godfrey Reggio and Oliviero Toscani. Previous directors include Laura Pollini and Dan Hill. The current president is Carlo Tunioli Young artists, designers, journalists and makers from around the world are invited to the centre and given a one-year scholarship, covering travel expenses, allowance and professional training and resources. Residents work in the areas of design, visual communication, photography, interaction, video, music and publishing under the guidance of Fabrica's core faculty, combining personal projects with work for clients.

Its first publication was Iranian Living Room, by 15 Iranian photographers, which was initially banned from being paid for through payments system PayPal for having the word "Iranian" in its title.

== Publications ==
- Iranian Living Room. Treviso, Italy: Fabrica, 2013. ISBN 978-88-908346-5-3. Second edition. Text in English and Italian. Introduction by Vanna Vannuccini, Hamid Ziarati and Enrico Bossan. Photographs by Mohammad Mahdi Amya, Majid Farahani, Saina Golzar, Sanaz Hajikhani, Hamed Ilkhan, Ali Kaveh, Mahshid Mahboubifar, Mehdi Moradpour, Sahar Pishsaraeian, Negar Sadehvandi, Hashem Shakeri, Sina Shiri, Morteza Soorani, Nazanin Tabatabaei Yazdi, and Ali Tajik.
