= Jessica Weber =

American graphic designer

Jessica Margot Weber (born March 18, 1949, in New York City) is an American art director, graphic designer, business owner, and adjunct professor of design.

Weber studied concurrently at Parsons School of Design and New York University (Steinhardt School). She studied sculpture with Chaim Gross at the New School for Social Research.

She is president and CEO of Jessica Weber Design, Inc., founded in 1986, which specializes in graphic design and marketing support for foundations and cultural, educational, and medical not-for-profit organizations.

Weber's past work includes her time as Founding Art Director of the International Review of Food & Wine magazine. She redesigned the magazine when it was acquired by the American Express Publishing Company and renamed Food & Wine magazine. She was previously Executive Art Director of Book-of-the-Month Club, a division of AOL Time Warner, Inc. She directed the design of the company’s five monthly magazines, record covers, and collateral material for its record division and catalog for its merchandise division. She was responsible for all corporate special projects, including an exhibit held at the 42nd Street New York Public Library entitled “Extraordinary Years 1926–1989, Book-of-the-Month Club Celebrates America’s Coming of Age in Literature, Culture, and the Arts.”

In the fall of 1987, Weber was invited to Japan to host a show of her design work at the Designers Gallery of the Sony Corporation in Tokyo. She was also a guest of the Tokyo Designers Gaikun where she lectured to students and conducted faculty design seminars. She is the recipient of over one hundred awards from the Art Directors Clubs of New York and Los Angeles, the American Institute of Graphic Arts, the Society of Illustrators, the Type Directors Club, the Society of Publication Designers, Communication Arts magazine, Graphis Inc. magazine and Print magazine.

Weber serves on the advisory boards of Aid for AIDS, the Fales Rare Book Library of New York University, the Medill School of Journalism’s Publication Program at Northwestern University in Evanston, IL, the Japan Creators Association, and the Martina Arroyo Foundation.

She previously served on the boards of the Public Health Research Institute, Parsons School of Design, the Scholarship Fund of the Art Directors Club of New York, the Center for Fiction, and the Presidents Advisory Council of New School University.

Weber is adjunct professor at Parsons The New School for Design where she has taught graphic design since 1980, and a visiting critic at Marywood University and the New Jersey College of Art. She is a former member of the faculty of the School of Visual Arts. She lectures frequently and has served on numerous juries for visual arts competitions.

Weber is a member of the Century Association, the Art Directors Club of New York, the Society of Illustrators, and the Society of Publication Designers.

Weber was married to designer Alan Peckolick from 1984 until his death in 2017.
