= Bonnie Siegler =

Bonnie Siegler (born 1963) is a New York-based graphic designer.

== Life ==
She is the founder of the design studio Eight and a Half and, before that, co-founded the design studio Number Seventeen in 1993. Her clients include Participant Media, Late Night with Seth Meyers, Saturday Night Live, HBO, Brooklyn Public Library, Maveron, Random House, The Criterion Collection, The New York Times, Nickelodeon, and the Frank Lloyd Wright Foundation.

She is also the author of two books published in 2018. Signs of Resistance: A Visual History of Protest in America and describes the efforts and art of protest from 1754 through to today. The other is Dear Client, This Book Will Teach You How to Get What You Want from Creative People, with 66 short chapters that guide the reader through different aspects of the process of working with creatives. Both books were published by Artisan Books, a division of Workman Publishing Company.

== Personal life ==
Bonnie Siegler is married to filmmaker, animator, and painter Jeff Scher. They currently live in Connecticut with their two children.

== Works ==
- Siegler, Bonnie (2018). Signs of Resistance. Artisan Books. ISBN 978-1-57965-866-3.
- Siegler, Bonnie (2018). Dear Client. Artisan Books. ISBN 978-1-57965-833-5.
- Stapinski, Helene; Siegler, Bonnie (2023). The American Way. Simon and Schuster. ISBN 978-1-9821-7166-7.
