= Alan Peckolick =

American graphic designer

- Born: Alan Jay Peckolick; October 3, 1940; Bronx, New York, U.S.
- Died: August 3, 2017 (aged 76); Danbury, Connecticut, U.S.
- Known for: Graphic design, photography, painting
- Spouse: Jessica Weber (m. 1984)

Alan Peckolick (October 3, 1940 – August 3, 2017) was an American graphic designer, painter, and photographer.

Peckolick was known for the typographic forms he created. His fascination for the graphic letter form underpinned much of his work as he drew much of his inspiration from historic signage and lettering. His projects included logo design and corporate identity for Revlon and New York University (typographic logo). He designed annual reports for AT&T, General Motors, Bell South and Pfizer. Internationally he worked for Society General (France), Grupo Industrial Alfa (Mexico), Mercedes-Benz (Germany) and Sony (Japan).

== Biography ==
Upon graduating from Pratt Institute in 1964, Peckolick went to work as an assistant to designer Herb Lubalin. In 1968 he opened his own design office. In 1972 he joined Lubalin, Smith & Carnase; several years later the company was reorganized and renamed Lubalin Peckolick Associates.

Apart from lecturing on graphic design in Hamburg, Stuttgart, Helsinki, Tokyo, London and Bergen, he regularly lectured at Parsons The New School for Design.

Peckolick's board affiliations included the Glaucoma Foundation and Save the Whales (Boston, MA). Peckolick was on the advisory board of Medasset, Mediterranean Association to Save the Sea Turtles. He was a member of Alliance Graphique Internationale, the Type Directors Club of New York, and the Vintage Car Club of America. He was an honorary member of the Art Directors Club of Bergen, Norway.

Peckolick was married to fellow graphic artist Jessica Weber.

== Recognition ==
Peckolick's work earned him over 500 design awards worldwide, including honorary membership in the art director's club of Bergen, Norway. His work has been featured in design journals and books. From 1985 on, Peckolick was included in every edition of "Who's Who in America" and since 1990 in every edition of "Who's Who in Graphic Design". In 2008, he was chosen as one of ten designers to be included in China's first survey of international graphic design. His poster work is in the permanent collection of the Gutenberg Museum in Mainz, Germany.

In 2002, Peckolick was invited to donate his archive to New York University's Fales Collection, housed in the Bobst Library. He was the subject of a career retrospective show at the university's Tracey/Barry Gallery in Autumn 2005, titled "A Life in Type: The Graphic Design Work of Alan Peckolick".

Peckolick began painting professionally in 1998. His work is represented in London (Cosa Gallery), New York City (Atlantic Gallery), and in Key West, FL (Lucky Street Gallery). His paintings are in numerous private collections in the US and Europe.

== Books ==
- Alan Peckolick, Gertrude Snyder. Herb Lubalin: Art Director, Graphic Designer and Typographer. Amshow & Archive; First Edition (April 1985).
