= Alexander Isley =

American graphic designer

Alexander Isley (born November 16, 1961) is an American graphic designer and educator.

== Early life and education ==
Alexander Isley was born in Durham, North Carolina and studied at Durham Academy, the University of North Carolina School of the Arts (high school visual arts diploma). Isley initially wanted to become an architect like his father but discovered design upon enrolling in North Carolina State University, where he received a degree in Environmental Design. He later attended the Cooper Union School of Art in New York and received a BFA in graphic design.

In 1994, Isley married Veronica Burke.

== Career ==
In 1984, Isley joined Tibor Kalman's influential M & Co. as senior designer. He held this position until 1987, when he joined Spy Magazine in 1987 as the first full-time art director. At Spy, he was tasked with building upon Steven Doyle's initial formatting and was awarded gold and silver medals from the Society of Publication Designers. In 1988, he founded Alexander Isley Inc. in New York City. In 1995, Isley moved the studio to Redding, Connecticut. The studio has worked on branding projects for Youth Service America, Armani Jeans and Goodwill, among others.

In 2004, Isley became the president of AIGA New York and an AIGA Fellow in 2013 after being a board member from 1988 to 1990.

In addition to his professional career, Isley taught Design and Typography at the School of Visual Arts from 1988 to 1990; Exhibit Design at the Cooper Union in 1992; and was a Critic and Lecturer at Yale from 1996 to 2011.

== Honors and awards ==
- Terry Sanford Scholarship to the University of North Carolina School of the Arts, 1979
- Art Directors Club of New York Herb Lubalin Memorial Award, 1984
- National Endowment for the Arts International Design Education Fellowship, 1984
- "The I.D. 40" honoree: I.D. Magazine’s survey of the country's leading design innovators, 1990
- Federal Design Achievement Award
- Distinguished Alumnus, NC State University, 2000
- Permanent collection, Museum of Modern Art
- Permanent collection, Cooper-Hewitt, National Design Museum, Smithsonian Institution
- AIGA Fellow, 2013
- AIGA Medal, 2014

== Archives ==
The Alexander Isley Papers at the Special Collections Research Center, North Carolina State University Libraries, Raleigh, covers Isley’s full career and includes initial concept explorations, original artwork, completed materials, and correspondence. An extensive selection of Isley’s poster designs are in the collection of the Museum of Design, Zürich.

== Bibliography ==
- Bos, Ben and Bos, Elly. AGI: Graphic Design Since 1950, Thames and Hudson, 2007. ISBN 0500513422
- Friedl, Friedrich. Typography: When, Who, How, Konemann, 1998. ISBN 1579120237
- Friedman, Mildred. Graphic Design in America: A Visual Language History, Abrams/Walker Art Center, 1989. ISBN 0810910365
- Heller, Martin. Who’s Who in Graphic Design, Werd-Verlag, 1994.
- Heller, Steven. Graphic Wit: The Art of Humor in Design, Watson-Guptill, 1991. ISBN 0823021610
- Jackson, Kenneth T., ed. The Encyclopedia of New York City, Yale University Press, 1995. ISBN 0300055366
- Lupton, Ellen. Mixing Messages: Graphic Design in Contemporary Culture, Princeton Architectural Press, 1996. ISBN 156898099X
- Miller, R. Craig. U. S. Design: 1975-2000, Prestel-Verlag, 2001. ISBN 3791326864
