= Florent (restaurant) =

Coordinates: 40.739483°N 74.007572°W

- Interactive map of Florent

Restaurant information
- Established: 1985
- Closed: 2008
- Food type: French
- Location: 69 Gansevoort Street, New York City, New York, 10014, United States

Florent was an all-night diner in the Meatpacking District of Manhattan that opened in 1985 and closed in 2008.

== History ==
Florent was located at 69 Gansevoort Street, one of the few remaining sett-paved streets in New York City. In 1985 Florent Morellet took over the R&L Restaurant, which had opened in 1943, and renamed it Florent. The following January, a reporter for New York magazine referred to it as "New York's hottest downtown eating spot".

Florent was a hub of gay New York. Morellet was diagnosed HIV-positive in 1987 and used to post his T-cell count on the restaurant's wall menu along with the daily specials. It attracted a highly eclectic clientele. It was also known for its Bastille Day celebrations, which started in 1989, the year of the French bicentennial. Other major annual celebrations were Halloween, New Year's Eve, and Oscar Night. Morellet campaigned for the preservation of the neighborhood and became known as "Unofficial Mayor of the Meatpacking District"; he preferred "Unofficial Queen".

The graphic design for the restaurant was designed by Tibor Kalman and Douglas Riccardi from M&Co, in exchange for free meals; examples are now in the MoMA design collection.

Florent Morellet, the eponymous owner of the restaurant, is the youngest son of French conceptual artist, François Morellet.

Erica De Mane, the food journalist and cookbook writer, began her cooking career at Florent in 1985.

Florent closed on June 29, 2008, after the landlord raised the rent considerably. In the last weeks, Morellet held five parties themed after the stages of grief.

== Films ==
In May 2011, Magic Lantern released Florent: Queen of the Meat Market, a documentary history of the restaurant directed by David Sigal.

As of September 2015, Alan Cumming is planning to co-produce with Sigal and star in a Showtime biography of Morellet focusing on Florent.

== See also ==
- List of French restaurants
