= Colors (magazine) =

Italian magazine

- Frequency: Quarterly
- Founded: 1991
- First issue: 1 July 1991; 34 years ago
- Final issue: 2014
- Company: Benetton Group
- Country: Italy
- Based in: Treviso
- Language: English, Italian, French, German, Spanish, Portuguese, Chinese, Korean, Serbian, Croatian
- Website: www.colorsmagazine.com
- ISSN: 1121-824X

Colors (stylised as COLORS) was a quarterly print magazine about 'the rest of the world' funded and published by the Italian Benetton clothing company. Founded in 1991 "as a way of communicating the intelligence of the Benetton brand to an extremely sophisticated consumer", it was published worldwide in multiple bilingual editions. Every issue of the magazine took a single theme and covered it from an international perspective. It was produced at the Fabrica research centre in Treviso, Italy.

== History ==
Tibor Kalman, Oliviero Toscani and Karrie Jacobs created the magazine in 1991, and it was produced at Kalman's design studio, M&Co, in New York City until 1993, when the magazine operations moved to Rome, followed by Paris in 1995, and then Treviso, Italy, in 1997. Since the early 1990s, Colors has maintained a global, humanistic outlook in its coverage of issues from AIDS to shopping; from 2001 onward, it became totally serious, and the only element that remains from its inception is the use of photo-journalism. From Issue 81 in 2011, Colors has been published in the form of guides to major issues for its ongoing Survival Guides series.

== Awards and recognition ==
The complete series of Colors issues was included in the 25/25 exhibition at the Design Museum, London (29 March - 22 June 2007), which featured the 25 most influential design objects of the past 25 years. Good Magazine, an American bi-monthly cultural and lifestyle publication, included the first thirteen issues under Kalman's editorship in the ranking of the 51 best magazines of all time. La Vanguardia, a Spanish daily, described it as one of the trendiest cultural magazines on the world scene. Colors was featured within Inside the Great Magazines, a Canadian documentary trilogy exploring the evolution of magazines from their European origins to their current popularity and the powerful influence they have on our social, political and cultural identities. Issue 76 of Colors won first prize in the Arts and Entertainment Stories category of the 2010 World Press Photo Competition (with the reportage Rainbowland by Kitra Cahana) and also gained a Merit at the 89th Art Director's Club Awards. Issue 79 was awarded the Silver Prize in the Editorial Design category at the 90th Art Director's Club Awards.

== Music ==
The Colors Music compilations Nordic, Cumbia, Ottomanic, Rio Funk and Inner Asian Pop were produced in co-operation with Irma Records, a Sony Music international label.

== Books ==
Colors published the books 1000 Extraordinary Objects, 1000 Signs and Colors Extraordinary Records with Taschen, and the books Hunger and Yellow Pages with Skira Editore. Faces and Violence were both published as part of the ColorsNotebook series by Birkhäuser. Colors also produced Africa Mon Amour, a 22-page guide to the 53 countries of Africa, as a supplement to the Autumn 2010 issue of the American Good Magazine.

== Exhibitions ==
Colors has held exhibitions in Florence, Rome, Naples, London, Istanbul, Madrid, Barcelona, Maastricht, Budapest, San Francisco, Luxembourg, Santiago, Mexico City, Bogotá, Shanghai and Sydney.

== Documentaries ==
Colors documentaries focus on major diversity-based themes. In collaboration with RSI Swiss Television, Colors produced a trilogy of documentaries that explore the most forbidding places in the world: Aral, Fishing in an Invisible Sea; Solitude at the End of the World; and Hunters Since the Beginning of Time.

Aral, Fishing in an Invisible Sea portrays the life of the last men left fishing the Aral Sea and won the Best Italian Documentary Prize at the Turin Film Festival 2004. Solitude at the End of the World, set in Tierra del Fuego, Patagonia, won the Special Jury Prize at the Festival de Cine Independente de Buenos Aires 2006; and Hunters Since the Beginning of Time, a portrait of whale hunters along the coast of the Bering Sea, was awarded the Best Documentary Prize at FICCO Festival de Cine Contemporaneo de Mexico 2008. Colors also produced the documentary Rocinha, Daylight of a Favela, about slum outside Rio de Janeiro populated by hundreds of thousands of people trying to lead normal lives. Rocinha later became a book of short stories by young writers, published by Mondadori.

== See also ==
- List of magazines in Italy
