= You're on Fire =

Single by They Might Be Giants

from the album Nanobots
- Published: 2013
- Released: February 21, 2013
- Recorded: 2012, Patrick Dillett's New York City studio
- Genre: Power pop
- Length: 2:42
- Label: Idlewild Recordings
- Songwriters: John Flansburgh, John Linnell
- Producers: Pat Dillett; They Might Be Giants

"You're on Fire" is a song by American alternative rock band They Might Be Giants. It was released on February 21, 2013 as an advance track from their album Nanobots, which was released March 5, 2013.

== Release ==
"You're on Fire" was the fourth advance track from Nanobots. It was preceded by "Call You Mom", "Black Ops", and "Lost My Mind", which appeared on Nanobots EP in January 2013. "You're on Fire" premiered on Stereogum on February 21, 2013. The music video was released on September 5, 2013.

== Music video ==
The song's music video was directed by Hoku Uchiyama and Adam Bolt and stars actress Lauren Lapkus. The video also features puppets made from vegetables purchased at a grocery store, as well as a silicone meat puppet constructed by Sue LaPrelle. The vegetables were mobilized using puppetry. Uchiyama was selected for the project by the band's member John Flansburgh, who had been impressed by the work he did on a music video for Evelyn Evelyn in 2010.

The music video explores the perspectives of various foods, which Lapkus's character is preparing for consumption with a significant other. When they are not in human eyeshot, the raw meat and vegetables appear to be performing the song on their own. The premise has been compared to the animated film Toy Story, in which a child's toys become autonomous when humans are not present.

== Reception ==
"You're on Fire" has been fairly well-received in critical reviews of Nanobots. Heather Phares, in her review of the album for Allmusic, described the song as "literal-minded" and "pure comedy". A Paste review of the album written by Alex Skidmore praised the song for easily "grabbing" the attention of the listener, as the album's lead track. Eric Limer of Gizmodo speculated that the track makes an effective single-song representation of the band's music. In his explanation of this point, Limer made note of the "call-and-response" guitar parts in stereo and "predictably absurd" lyrics. The music video for the song was also lauded as innovative and playful by Hellhound Music and MTV's Buzzworthy Blog.

The track became a fixture of setlists on the tour that accompanied the release of the album. In a show review, Mitch Kocen referred to a performance of the song as a "freshly-minted crowd pleaser".

== Personnel ==
They Might Be Giants

- John Linnell – songwriting, vocals, keyboards
- John Flansburgh – songwriting, guitar, backing vocals

Backing band

- Marty Beller – drums
- Robin Goldwasser – backing vocals
- Dan Miller – additional guitar
- Danny Weinkauf – bass guitar

Production

- Patrick Dillett – producer
- They Might Be Giants – producer
- Jon Altschuler – engineer
