= Album Raises New and Troubling Questions =

2011 compilation album by They Might Be Giants

Compilation album by They Might Be Giants
- Released: October 28, 2011
- Genre: Alternative rock
- Length: 40:54
- Label: Idlewild Recordings
- Producer: Various

They Might Be Giants chronology
Join Us (2011)	Album Raises New and Troubling Questions (2011)	Nanobots (2013)

Album Raises New and Troubling Questions is a 2011 compilation album by American alternative rock band They Might Be Giants. It is the second compilation released by the band through their own Idlewild Recordings. It includes several songs originally written for Join Us, as well as other rarities. It was released online via iTunes and Amazon and limited run of CDs from the band's website.

The cover of "Tubthumping" by Chumbawamba was recorded for The A.V. Club's Undercover series of videos. The song features A.V. Club writers on backing vocals.

The song "200 SBemails" was originally featured on the web series Homestar Runner.

Professional ratings
Review scores
Source	Rating
Consequence	C−
Robert Christgau	(2-star Honorable Mention)
Wired	(favorable)
SF Weekly	(favorable)

== Track listing ==
No.	Title	Length
1.	"O We"	0:48
2.	"Authenticity Trip"	2:22
3.	"You Probably Get That A Lot" (Elegant Too Remix)	3:03
4.	"Marty Beller Mask"	2:00
5.	"Now I Know"	1:35
6.	"How Now Dark Cloud?"	2:07
7.	"The Fellowship of Hell"	2:10
8.	"Mountain Flowers"	1:11
9.	"Doom Doom"	1:12
10.	"Money for Dope"	2:39
11.	"Read a Book"	1:04
12.	"Havalina"	2:37
13.	"Tubthumping" (feat. The Onion AV Club Choir)	3:22
14.	"Electronic Istanbul (Not Constantinople)"	2:49
15.	"Cloisonné" (Live)	2:47
16.	"200 SBemails"	0:42
17.	"Boat of Car" (feat. The Other Thing Brass Band)	1:14
18.	"Mr. Me" (feat. The Other Thing Brass Band)	2:00
19.	"Dirt Bike" (feat. The Other Thing Brass Band)	3:07
20.	"Particle Man" (feat. The Other Thing Brass Band)	2:07
Total length:		40:54
