= Tibor Kalman =

American graphic designer (1949–1999)

- טיבור קלמן
- Born: Tibor George Kalman; July 6, 1949; Budapest, Hungary
- Died: May 2, 1999 (aged 49); Vega Alta, Puerto Rico
- Education: New York University
- Occupation: Graphic designer
- Known for: graphic design Colors magazine
- Spouse: Maira Berman (m. 1981)
- Children: 2
- Parents: George Tibor Kalman (father); Marianne I. Dezsőffi (mother)
- Awards: AIGA medal (1999)

Tibor George Kalman (Hebrew: טיבור קלמן; July 6, 1949 – May 2, 1999) was an American graphic designer of Hungarian origin, well known for his work as founder of design studio M & Co. and editor-in-chief of Colors magazine.

== Early life ==
Tibor George Kalman was born on July 6, 1949, in Budapest, to parents Marianne I. (née Deezsoffy or Dezsőffi) and George Tibor Kalman. He became a United States resident at the age of seven in 1956, after he and his family fled Hungary to escape the Soviet invasion, settling in Poughkeepsie, New York. Kalman attended Our Lady of Lourdes High School. Both of his parents had Jewish ethnic roots and converted to Catholicism to avoid persecution, so "Kalman only became aware that he was Jewish at the age of 18".

In 1967, he enrolled in New York University (NYU) to study journalism and history. While at NYU, he wrote for a student newspaper, joined Students for a Democratic Society, a leftist student organization, and took part in Anti-Vietnam war protests. He dropped out of NYU in 1970 and traveled to Cuba to harvest sugar cane and learn about Cuban culture as a member of the Venceremos Brigade.

== Career ==
In 1971, Kalman returned to New York City where he was hired by Leonard Riggio for a small bookstore that eventually became Barnes & Noble. A college dropout with no formal training in design, Kalman claimed that working on window displays at the store was his opportunity to "get out of the basement where (he) was alphabetizing books". As the store grew into a national chain, he became the creative director of their in-house design department, where he created advertisements, store signs, shopping bags, and the original B&N bookplate trademark. As the head of Barnes & Noble's design team for 11 years, Kalman was behind their brand identity design.

=== M & Co. ===
In 1979, Kalman – along with his wife Maira Kalman, Carol Bokuniewicz, and Liz Trovato – started the design firm M & Co., which did corporate work for such diverse clients as the Limited Corporation, the new wave rock group Talking Heads, fashion designer Isaac Mizrahi, the Whitney Museum, and Restaurant Florent in New York City's Meatpacking District. He sought to challenge mundane design thinking and aspired to create unpredictable work.

By the 1980s, Kalman was known for being "the 'bad boy' of graphic design" because of his antics and radical consciousness. He believed that award-winning design was only possible when the client was ethical, and frequently called other designers out when he did not agree with their actions. He defined good design as a benefit to everyday life and should be used to increase public awareness of social issues. Kalman adopted a vernacular style as a way to protest corporate International Style which was the primary design style of the time.

=== Artforum and Interview magazines ===
Kalman acted as art director of Artforum magazine in 1987–1988, and as creative director of Interview magazine in 1989–1991, collaborating with the same editor, Ingrid Sischy, at both publications. He left his post at Interview after accepting an editor-in-chief position at Colors.

=== Colors magazine ===
Kalman and Oliviero Toscani started the Benetton-sponsored magazine Colors in 1991. Two years later, Kalman closed M & Co. and moved to Rome, to work exclusively on Colors. Billed as "a magazine about the rest of the world", Colors focused on multiculturalism and global awareness. This perspective was communicated through bold graphic design, multilingual typography with texts in seven languages, and juxtaposition of photographs and doctored images, including a series in which highly recognizable figures such as the Pope and Queen Elizabeth were depicted as racial minorities.

== Personal life ==
From 1981 up until his death, Kalman was married to the illustrator and author Maira Kalman (née Berman). They met while attending NYU. Together they had two children, Lulu Bodoni and Alex Onomatopoeia.

== Death and legacy ==
The onset of non-Hodgkin's lymphoma forced Kalman to leave Colors in 1995 and return to New York. In 1997, he re-opened M & Co. and continued to work until his death on May 2, 1999, in Vega Alta, Puerto Rico. Kalman was posthumously awarded the 1999 AIGA medal as the "design profession's moral compass and its most fervent provocateur".

== Publications ==
- Tibor Kalman: Perverse Optimist, a book about Kalman's work and that with M&Co, was published by Princeton Architectural Press in 1999. Tibor Kalman (Designer); Peter Hall, Michael Bierut (Editors); Kurt Andersen, Steven Heller, Rick Poynor, Paola Antonelli, David Byrne, Jay Chiat, Jenny Holzer, Isaac Mizrahi, Florent Morellet, Leonard Riggio, Rebecca Robertson, Ingrid Sischy, Elizabeth Sussman, Olivero Toscani (Contributors) ISBN 1568982585
- Wieners, Brad (December 1996). "Color Him a Provocateur: Tibor Kalman interview". Wired.

== See also ==
- First Things First 2000 manifesto
- List of AIGA medalists
- Colors
- Naked
- Remain in Light
