= Paul Sahre =

American graphic designer

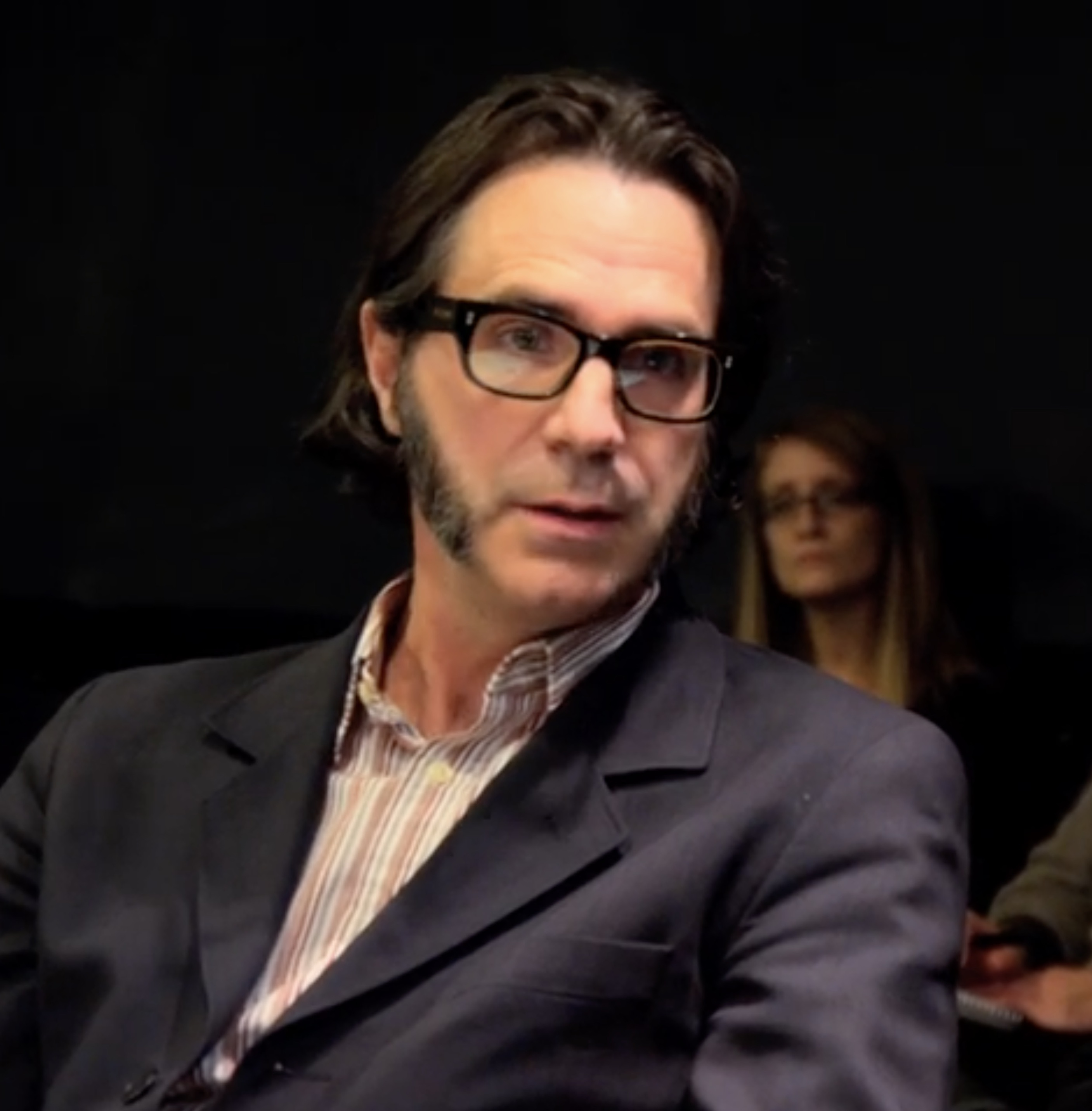
Sahre interviewed at the School of Visual Arts during live recording of Debbie Millman's Design Matters podcast, 2012

Paul Sahre (pronounced say-er; born 1964) is an American graphic designer and illustrator. He has designed book covers and created numerous illustrations for The New York Times.

== Biography ==
Sahre was born in Johnson City in upstate New York, and received his BFA and MFA degrees from Kent State University. After graduating, he lived in Baltimore and worked at a small design studio Barton-Gillet before moving to New York City in 1995. He established New York City based design studio, Office of Paul Sahre, in 1997. Between 1997 and 2014, his office was located above a Dunkin' Donuts store on the corner of 6th Avenue and 14th Street in Manhattan.

Sahre's designs for book covers are well-known and includes series by the authors Rick Moody, Ernest Hemingway and Chuck Klosterman. He is a frequent contributor of illustrations to The New York Times, and designed the typeface Fur in 1994. Sahre has also provided illustrations for The Atlantic, Newsweek, and Bloomberg Businessweek. Sahre has collaborated with alternative rock band They Might Be Giants on multiple occasions; his work on their album Book earned him and the band a Grammy nomination for Best Boxed or Special Limited Edition Package.

Sahre teaches graphic design at the School of Visual Arts in New York City.

== Personal life ==
Sahre is married to Emily Oberman, designer and partner at Pentagram. They have two sons.

== Bibliography ==
- Fresh Dialogue 1, New Voices in Graphic Design, Christoph Niemann, Nicholas Blechman, Paul Sahre, Paula Scher, Princeton Architectural Press, 2000.
- Hello World: A Life in Ham Radio, Danny Gregory, Paul Sahre, Princeton Architectural Press, 2003.
- Leisurama Now: The Beach House for Everyone 1964–, Paul Sahre, Princeton Architectural Press, 2008.
- Two-Dimensional Man: A Graphic Memoir, Abrams Press, 2017.
