= Imelda May discography =

Discography of an Irish musician

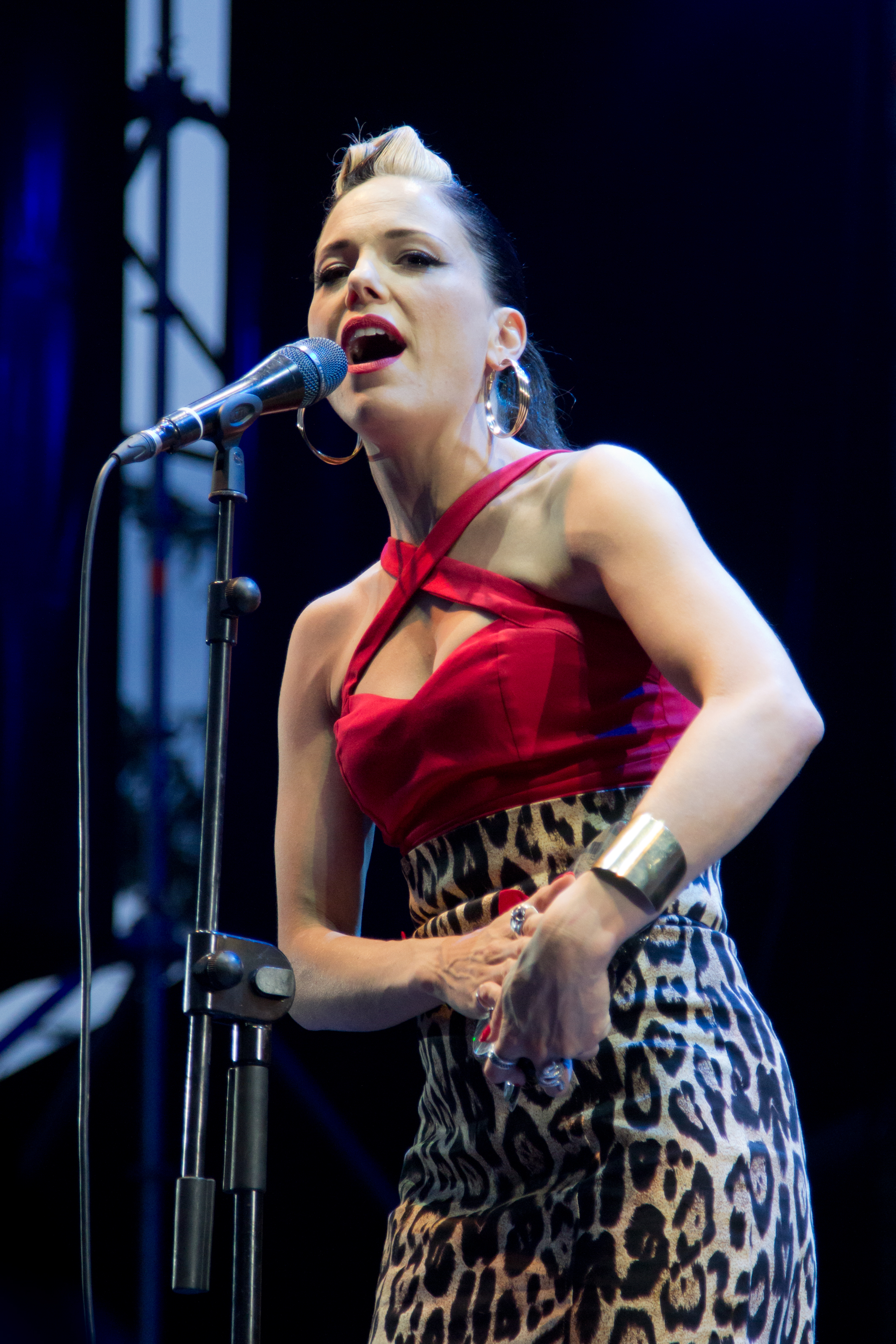
- Imelda May performing live at Madgarden 2015.
- Studio albums: 6
- Singles: 10
- Music videos: 8

The discography of Imelda May, an Irish rockabilly musician and singer-songwriter, comprises six studio albums, ten singles and several music videos.

== Albums ==
=== Studio albums ===
List of studio albums, with selected chart positions, sales figures and certifications
Title	Album details	Peak chart positions									Certifications
Title	Album details	IRL	AUS	BEL	FRA	NZL	SPA	UK	US	US Heat	Certifications
No Turning Back	Released: 14 February 2003; Label: Foot Tapping; Formats: CD	—	—	—	—	—	—	—	—	—	
Love Tattoo	Released: 20 October 2008; Label: Universal; Formats: CD, digital download	1	—	—	14	—	—	58	—	—	BPI: Gold
Mayhem	Released: 3 September 2010; Label: Decca; Formats: CD, LP, digital download	1	46	72	—	30	57	7	108	1	BPI: Gold
Tribal	Released: 28 April 2014; Label: Decca; Formats: CD, LP, digital download	1	—	186	133	17	81	3	92	—	
Life Love Flesh Blood	Released: 7 April 2017; Label: Decca; Formats: CD, LP, digital download	2	—	60	151	— (Note: Life Love Flesh Blood did not enter the NZ Top 40 Albums Chart, but peaked at number one on the NZ Heatseeker Albums Chart.)	—	5	—	—	BPI: Silver
11 Past the Hour	Released: 16 April 2021; Label: Decca; Formats: CD, LP, digital download	1	—	174	—	—	—	6	—	—	

== Singles ==
List of singles as lead artist, with selected chart positions, showing year released and album name
Title	Year	Peak chart positions		Album
Title	Year	IRL	BEL	Album
"Johnny Got a Boom Boom"	2009	88	—	Love Tattoo
"Big Bad Handsome Man"	2009	—	—	Love Tattoo
"Psycho"	2010	—	—	Mayhem
"Mayhem"	2010	24	—	Mayhem
"Kentish Town Waltz"	2010	25	—	Mayhem
"Inside Out"	2011	—	—	Mayhem
"Sneaky Freak"	2011	—	—	Mayhem
"Road Runner"	2011	—	96	More Mayhem
"Make a Wish"	2011	46	—	Non-album single
"It's Good to Be Alive"	2014	19	—	Tribal
"Wild Woman"	2014	—	—	Tribal
"Call Me"	2016	—	—	Life Love Flesh Blood
"Black Tears" (featuring Jeff Beck)	2017	—	—	Life Love Flesh Blood
"Should've Been You"	2017	—	—	Life Love Flesh Blood
"Just One Kiss" (featuring Noel Gallagher & Ronnie Wood)	2021	—	—	11 Past The Hour
"—" denotes releases that did not chart or were not released in that territory.
