= Inside Out (Imelda May song) =

Single by Imelda May

from the album Mayhem
- B-side: "Inside Out" (remix)
- Released: January 16, 2011
- Recorded: May – June 2010 at Embassy Studios in Basingstoke, United Kingdom
- Genre: Rockabilly
- Length: 3:28
- Label: Decca
- Songwriter(s): Imelda May
- Producer(s): Imelda May, Andy Wright, Gavin Goldberg

Imelda May singles chronology
"Kentish Town Waltz" (2010)	"Inside Out" (2011)

"Inside Out" is a song by Irish rockabilly singer Imelda May. Written solely by May, the song was released as her sixth single on January 16, 2011 and the third single from her third studio album Mayhem.

== Origin and recording ==
The song was written after the release of May's second studio album, Love Tattoo, which she was promoting on tour at the time of writing. The song was recorded during the Mayhem sessions at Embassy Studios, a sixteen track analogue recording studio in a converted cow shed, near Basingstoke, United Kingdom. A remixed version of the song was available as a bonus track, via digital download, for those who purchased the CD version of Mayhem and registered to May's mailing list.

== Release and promotion ==
"Inside Out" was announced for release on January 7, 2011 by May's record label Decca and on January 16, the digital download version of the single was released. While the release date for the 7" single was delayed for unconfirmed reasons, it was eventually released on January 31.

The song was performed on The Graham Norton Show on January 7. May performed an in-studio session on The Craig Charles Funk and Soul Show on BBC Radio 6 on January 15 in order to promote the single. May was also featured as a guest on The Vanessa Show on Channel 5 on January 28.

== Music video ==
A promotional music video for "Inside Out" (using the remix) was officially released online by Decca on February 8, 2011 on YouTube, however was set to private viewing for unknown reasons. The video was re-released on February 18, 2011. The music video was directed by Lindy Heymann. and features the remixed version of the song and its concept diverge significantly from previous music videos. The lyrics to the song are visually shown on different-coloured backdrops and incorporates segments from the music videos to "Psycho" and "Mayhem." The lyrical backdrop scenes also use film grain and vertical lines, a common feature of early 20th century movies.

A second music video, also set to the remix, is also on YouTube.

== Musicians and personnel ==
The Imelda May Band

- Imelda May - vocals, bodhrán
- Darrel Higham - guitars
- Al Gare - bass, double bass
- Stevew Rushton - drums, percussion
- Dave Priseman - trumpet, flugel, percussion

Guest musicians

- Olly Wilby - clarinet
- Andy Wood - trombone

Technical personnel

- Imelda May - producer, mixing
- Andy Wright - producer, mixing
- Gavin Goldberg - producer, mixing
- Graham Dominy - engineer
- Darrel Highham - mixing
- Guy Davie - mastering

== Track listing ==
All songs written by Imelda May.

Digital download

1. "Inside Out" - 3:28
2. "Inside Out" (Vs. Blue Jay Gonzalez remix) - 3:13

7" vinyl

1. "Inside Out" - 3:28
2. "Inside Out" (Vs. Blue Jay Gonzalez remix) - 3:13
