= Psycho (Imelda May song) =

Single by Imelda May

from the album Mayhem
- B-side: "My Baby Left Me"
- Released: June 28, 2010
- Recorded: May – June 2010 at Embassy Studios in Basingstoke, United Kingdom
- Genre: Rockabilly
- Length: 2:52
- Label: Decca
- Songwriter: Imelda May
- Producers: Imelda May, Andy Wright, Gavin Goldberg

Imelda May singles chronology
| "Big Bad Handsome Man" (2009) | "Psycho" (2010) | "Mayhem" (2010) |

Alternate cover
- Limited edition 7" pink vinyl cover

"Psycho" is a song by Irish rockabilly singer Imelda May. Written solely by May, the song was released as her third single on June 28, 2010, and the lead single from her third studio album, Mayhem. The single was May's first release on her new record label, Decca.

== Origin and recording ==
The song was written after the release of May's second studio album, Love Tattoo, which she was promoting on tour at the time of writing. The song was recorded during the Mayhem sessions at Embassy Studios, a sixteen track analogue recording studio in a converted cow shed, near Basingstoke, United Kingdom. A remastered version of the song was released as a bonus track on the iTunes version of Mayhem.

== Release and promotion ==
"Psycho" was announced for release in May 2010 at which time the recording and production was completed. In the official press release by Decca Records, it was noted that "'Psycho' sees Imelda displaying some of her more disparate influences, as if PJ Harvey's "Sheela Na Gig" had been recorded in the Ace cafe in North London in front of a load of rockers."

May's following tour of the United States with Jeff Beck promoted the song abroad and in Ireland and the United Kingdom, the song was performed on The Late Late Show on September 10 and Later... with Jools Holland on October 12, respectively.

Though well-promoted in comparison to her previous singles, the single failed chart in neither Ireland nor the United Kingdom.

== Music video ==
Filmed on a higher budget than her only previous music video, "Johnny Got a Boom Boom", the promotional music video for "Psycho" is aptly set in a mental institution and features May as a nurse delivering patients with medication. The video also features The Imelda May Band performing in a solitary confinement room.

== Musicians and personnel ==
The Imelda May Band

- Imelda May - vocals, bodhrán
- Darrel Higham - guitars
- Al Gare - bass, double bass
- Stevew Rushton - drums, percussion
- Dave Priseman - trumpet, flugel, percussion

Technical personnel

- Imelda May - producer, mixing
- Andy Wright - producer, mixing
- Gavin Goldberg - producer, mixing
- Graham Dominy - engineer
- Darrel Highham - mixing
- Guy Davie - mastering

== Track listing ==
All songs written by Imelda May.

Digital download

1. "Psycho" - 2:54
2. "My Baby Left Me" - 2:57
3. "Sneaky Freak" - 3:10
4. "Psycho" (video) - 2:44

Limited edition 7" vinyl

1. "Psycho" - 2:54
2. "My Baby Left Me" - 2:57
