= Mayhem (Imelda May song) =

Single by Imelda May

from the album Mayhem
- B-side: "Proud and Humble"
- Released: 13 September 2010
- Recorded: May – June 2010 at Embassy Studios in Basingstoke, United Kingdom
- Genre: Rockabilly
- Length: 2:46
- Label: Decca
- Songwriter: Imelda May
- Producers: Imelda May, Andy Wright, Gavin Goldberg

Imelda May singles chronology
| "Psycho" (2010) | "Mayhem" (2010) | "Kentish Town Waltz" (2010) |

"Mayhem" is a song by Irish rockabilly singer Imelda May. Written solely by May, the song was released as her fourth single on 13 September 2010 and the second single from her third studio album of the same name. It has become one of May's signature songs, next to her first single "Johnny Got a Boom Boom."

== Origin and recording ==
The song was written after the release of May's second studio album, Love Tattoo, which she was promoting on tour at the time of writing. The song was recorded during the Mayhem sessions at Embassy Studios, a sixteen track analogue recording studio in a converted cow shed, near Basingstoke, United Kingdom. A remastered version of the song was released as a bonus track on the iTunes version of Mayhem. Alternative mixes by Andy Green and producer Andy Wright were released as part of a desktop widget available on Imelda May's official website.

Speaking of the writing and production of both the song and the album, May said: "I'm over the moon with how Mayhem has turned out – I hope people enjoy it. I feel I’ve made the album I wanted that reflects the spectrum of all my influences from music past but is a record firmly in the here & now."

== Release and promotion ==
"Mayhem" was released on 13 September 2010 after the release of Mayhem in Ireland ten days earlier and after the album was delayed for release in the United Kingdom.

The song was performed on The Late Late Show on 10 September and Later... with Jools Holland on 12 October.

"Mayhem" was May's first release to chart in Ireland. Entering the charts on 9 September, it peaked in its second week at No. 24 in the Irish Singles Chart.

== Music video ==
Filmed on a similar budget to her previous single "Psycho", the promotional music video for "Mayhem" is centered around the lyrics of the song, which is a story of a recently separated couple. The video also features The Imelda May Band performing the song.

== Musicians and personnel ==
The Imelda May Band

- Imelda May - vocals, bodhrán
- Darrel Higham - guitars
- Al Gare - bass, double bass
- Stevew Rushton - drums, percussion
- Dave Priseman - trumpet, flugel, percussion

Technical personnel

- Imelda May - producer, mixing
- Andy Wright - producer, mixing
- Gavin Goldberg - producer, mixing
- Graham Dominy - engineer
- Darrel Highham - mixing
- Guy Davie - mastering

== Track listing ==
All songs written by Imelda May.

Digital download

1. "Mayhem" - 2:46
2. "Mayhem" (acoustic) - 2:23
3. "Proud and Humble" - 4:00
4. "Mayhem" (mastered version) - 2:58

7" vinyl

1. "Mayhem" - 2:46
2. "Proud and Humble" - 4:00
