= List of number-one albums of 2010 (Ireland) =

These are the Irish Recorded Music Association's number one albums of 2010, per the Top 100 Individual Artist Albums chart.

== Number-one albums ==
Artist	Album	Reached #1	Weeks
Paolo Nutini	Sunny Side Up	8 January 2010	2
Lady Gaga	The Fame/The Fame Monster	22 January 2010	3
Michael Bublé	Crazy Love	12 February 2010	1
Cast of Glee	Glee: The Music, Volume 1	19 February 2010	3
Boyzone	Brother	12 March 2010	2
Cast of Glee	Glee: The Music, Volume 2	26 March 2010	2
Justin Bieber	My Worlds	9 April 2010	1
Mumford & Sons	Sigh No More	16 April 2010	1
AC/DC	Iron Man 2	23 April 2010	3
Cathy Davey	The Nameless	14 May 2010	1
Villagers	Becoming a Jackal	21 May 2010	1
Cast of Glee	Glee: The Music, Volume 3 Showstoppers	28 May 2010	3
Cast of Glee	Glee: The Music, Journey to Regionals	18 June 2010	1
Eminem	Recovery	25 June 2010	4
Jedward	Planet Jedward	23 July 2010	2
Arcade Fire	The Suburbs	6 August 2010	2
Eminem	Recovery	20 August 2010	2
Katy Perry	Teenage Dream	3 September 2010	1
Imelda May	Mayhem	10 September 2010	1
The Script	Science & Faith	17 September 2010 (Note: Debuted at number one.)	5
Kings of Leon	Come Around Sundown	22 October 2010	2
Bon Jovi	Greatest Hits	5 November 2010	2
Take That	Progress	19 November 2010	1
Westlife	Gravity	26 November 2010	3
Take That	Progress	17 December 2010	2
Rihanna	Loud	30 December 2010	2

== See also ==
- 2010 in music
- List of number-one albums (Ireland)
