= List of number-one albums of 2009 (Ireland) =

These are the Irish Recorded Music Association's number one albums of 2009, per the Top 100 Individual Artist Albums chart.

Issue date	Album	Artist
1 January	The Circus	Take That
8 January	I Am... Sasha Fierce	Beyoncé
15 January	I Am... Sasha Fierce	Beyoncé
22 January	Songs for You, Truths for Me	James Morrison
29 January	Working On A Dream	Bruce Springsteen
12 February	The Fame	Lady Gaga
26 February	Blue Lights on the Runway	Bell X1
5 March	No Line On the Horizon	U2
13 March	No Line On the Horizon	U2
20 March	The Fame	Lady Gaga
27 March	Songs for My Mother	Ronan Keating
2 April	The Fame	Lady Gaga
9 April	Eoghan Quigg	Eoghan Quigg
16 April	The Fame	Lady Gaga
23 April	Listen	Christy Moore
21 May	Relapse	Eminem
11 June	Sunny Side Up	Paolo Nutini
18 June	Love Tattoo	Imelda May
25 June	Love Tattoo	Imelda May
2 July	The Essential Michael Jackson	Michael Jackson
9 July	The Essential Michael Jackson	Michael Jackson
16 July	The Essential Michael Jackson	Michael Jackson
23 July	The Essential Michael Jackson	Michael Jackson
30 July	The Essential Michael Jackson	Michael Jackson
6 August	The Essential Michael Jackson	Michael Jackson
13 August	The Script	The Script
20 August	The Script	The Script
27 August	Humbug	Arctic Monkeys
3 September	The Script	The Script
10 September	The Script	The Script
17 September	The Resistance	Muse
24 September	Celebration	Madonna
1 October	Brand New Eyes	Paramore
8 October	Celebration	Madonna
15 October	She Wolf	Shakira
22 October	Crazy Love	Michael Bublé
29 October	Crazy Love	Michael Bublé
5 November	Crazy Love	Michael Bublé
12 November	JLS	JLS
19 November	JLS	JLS
26 November	I Dreamed a Dream	Susan Boyle
3 December	I Dreamed a Dream	Susan Boyle
10 December	I Dreamed a Dream	Susan Boyle
17 December	Crazy Love	Michael Bublé
24 December	Crazy Love	Michael Bublé
31 December	Crazy Love	Michael Bublé

== See also ==
- 2009 in music
- List of number-one albums (Ireland)
