= Big Bad Handsome Man =

Single by Imelda May

from the album Love Tattoo
- Released: April 13, 2009
- Recorded: 2008 at Embassy Studios in Basingstoke, United Kingdom
- Genre: Rockabilly, jazz
- Length: 2:45
- Label: Ambassador Records (Universal Music Ireland)
- Songwriter(s): Imelda May
- Producer(s): Imelda May

Imelda May singles chronology
| "Johnny Got a Boom Boom" (2009) | "Big Bad Handsome Man" (2009) | "Psycho" (2010) |

"Big Bad Handsome Man" is a song by Irish rockabilly singer Imelda May. Written solely by May, the song was released as her second single on April 13, 2009 and final single from her second studio album, Love Tattoo.

== Origin and recording ==
The song is known to have been written by May during her professional career. The song was recorded during the Love Tattoo sessions at Embassy Studios, a sixteen track analogue recording studio in a converted cow shed, near Basingstoke, United Kingdom.

== Release and promotion ==
Though no promotional music video for "Big Bad Handsome Man" was recorded, the song still remained popular among critics and fans, though not to the extent of its predecessor, "Johnny Got a Boom Boom".

The song was performed at various television appearances by May in promotion for Love Tattoo, including Later... with Jools Holland, on which she gained recognition in the United Kingdom and The Late Late Show.

The song was featured in a trailer for the HBO television series True Blood in 2009, and further promoted May in the United States, where she later toured with British musician Jamie Cullum.

== Musicians and personnel ==
The Imelda May Band

- Imelda May - vocals, bodhrán
- Darrel Higham - guitars
- Al Gare - bass, double bass
- Dean Beresford - drums, percussion
- Danny McCormack - piano, hammond
- Dave Priseman - trumpet, flugel, percussion

Technical personnel

- Imelda May - producer, engineer, mixing
- Guy Davie - mastering

== Track listing ==
All songs written by Imelda May.

Digital download

1. "Big Bad Handsome Man" (radio edit) - 2:22
