= Kat Men =

American/British rockabilly band (since 2006)

- Origin: Wisconsin
- Genres: Rockabilly
- Years active: 2006–2009, since 2012
- Labels: Decca Records
- Members: Darrel Higham; Slim Jim Phantom; Al Gare
- Past members: Gilby Clarke (2007–09)
- Website: Official website

Kat Men is an American/British rockabilly band, formed in 2006 by former Stray Cats drummer Slim Jim Phantom, and Darrel Higham. The duo released its debut album, Kat Men on Kat Fight Records, on 23 March 2006. It was released with 4 extra tracks, on Foot Tapping Records, on 12 November 2012. The follow-up, The Kat Men Cometh, was released, on Decca Records, on 8 April 2013. Their third album Kat Men Are Back was released, on Foot Tapping Records, on 22 September 2023.

In 2012, former Imelda May bassist Al Gare joined the band.

== History ==
Kat Men formed in 2006 when drummer Slim Jim Phantom and guitarist Darrel Higham met during a jam session at the Oneida Casino, in Wisconsin. The duo subsequently embarked upon a European tour, and recorded their debut studio album, Kat Men with former Guns N' Roses guitarist Gilby Clarke. The duo continued to tour until 2009 when Higham departed to perform with his wife Imelda May. Phantom subsequently joined a reunited Stray Cats and performed in the band The Head Cat.

In 2011, the duo reunited and recorded a new studio album, The Kat Men Cometh, in 2012 for a March 25, 2013 release. Former Imelda May bassist Al Gare joined the band's touring line-up in 2012, with the band scheduled to embark upon a UK tour in October 2012.

In 2013, the band played at the Screamin' Festival.

== Discography ==
- Kat Men (2006)
- The Kat Men Cometh (2013)
- Kat Men Are Back (2023)
