= Kentish Town Waltz =

Single by Imelda May

from the album Mayhem
- B-side: "Kentish Town Waltz" (featuring Lou Reed)/"Eternity"
- Released: 15 November 2010
- Recorded: May – June 2010 at Embassy Studios in Basingstoke, United Kingdom and September 2010 in New York City, United States
- Genre: Ballad
- Length: 4:50
- Label: Decca
- Songwriter: Imelda May
- Producers: Imelda May, Andy Wright, Gavin Goldberg

Imelda May singles chronology
"Mayhem" (2009)	"Kentish Town Waltz" (2010)	"Inside Out" (2011)

"Kentish Town Waltz" is a song by Irish rockabilly singer Imelda May. Written solely by May, the song was released as her fifth single on 15 November 2010 and the third single from her third studio album, Mayhem. The song, which has been described as "the standout song" of the album, is one of May's autobiographical songs and was also rerecorded in New York City with iconic musician Lou Reed.

== Origin and recording ==
The song was originally recorded during the Mayhem sessions at Embassy Studios, a sixteen track analogue recording studio in a converted cow shed, near Basingstoke, United Kingdom in mid-2010. It was eventually featured as the fourth track on Mayhem. American record producer Tony Visconti became a fan of the song soon after its release and forwarded the song to former Velvet Underground frontman Lou Reed who then invited May to fly to New York City to specifically rerecord the song. May has also admitted that she found it strange to work with a musician as iconic as Reed stating that ""It was weird asking, 'Would you mind doing that line again, Mr Reed, please?'. And he was like, 'Sure! It's your song!'" May has also said that in-studio she and Reed "got on like a house on fire".

== Music and lyrics ==
"Kentish Town Waltz" is considered one of May's more abstract songs due to its lack of rockabilly sound or influence and its focus on a more folk and blues-inspired sound. In comparison to its upbeat predecessor "Mayhem", the song is mellow and follows standard chord progressions throughout with the verses being composed of two chords (G-D), the bridge being composed of two main chords (C-Am) and finishing with a major lift (D) and the chorus slightly alternating (C-G-D). There is also little emphasis on the drums in the album version of the song which May describes as being reminiscent of the album's "soft times".

Lyrically, the song is autobiographical and describes May's experiences of living in Kentish Town, an area in north London and general domestic struggle with her husband, Darrel Higham, whilst residing there. Speaking of the song, May said:

"I wrote 'Kentish Town Waltz' about when I first came over to London with my husband... It's about struggling but also having a great time if you stick together. It might tie in with even more people now there's been a recession."

== Release and promotion ==
"Kentish Town Waltz" was announced for release in early November 2010 and the same month, May appeared as a guest on music panel show Never Mind the Buzzcocks and during the show, Lou Reed's duet version of the song was discussed.

The song was not well-promoted in comparison to her previous singles, however, critical acclaim for the song was extremely positive and the song reached No. 28 on the Irish Singles Chart in early December 2010, though failed to chart in the United Kingdom.

== Music video ==
The promotional music video for "Kentish Town Waltz" aptly features clips of Kentish Town throughout including streets, the main train station and the interior of pubs, most of which reflect the song's lyrics. The first half of the music video is shot in black and white and includes The Imelda May Band performing in-studio. The latter half of the video is shot in colour and includes The Imelda May Band performing live. Both halves of the music video use split-frame techniques to show the performances and Kentish Town clips.

== Musicians and personnel ==
The Imelda May Band

- Imelda May - vocals
- Darrel Higham - guitars
- Al Gare - bass, double bass
- Stevew Rushton - drums, percussion
- Dave Priseman - trumpet, flugel, percussion

Guest musician

- Lou Reed - vocals (on "Kentish Town Waltz")

Technical personnel

- Imelda May - producer, mixing
- Andy Wright - producer, mixing
- Gavin Goldberg - producer, mixing
- Graham Dominy - engineer
- Darrel Highham - mixing
- Guy Davie - mastering

== Track listing ==
All songs written by Imelda May unless otherwise noted.

Digital download

1. "Kentish Town Waltz" - 4:50
2. "Kentish Town Waltz" (featuring Lou Reed) - 3:27
3. "Eternity" (Darrel Higham) - 3:16
4. "Eternity" (acoustic version) - 2:09
5. "Kentish Town Waltz" (video) - 3:43

7" vinyl

1. "Kentish Town Waltz" - 4:50
2. "Eternity" - 3:16
