= Lists of Irish Albums Chart number ones =

This is a list of number-one albums in Ireland by year from the Irish Albums Chart. The albums chart is issued weekly by the Irish Recorded Music Association (IRMA) and compiled on behalf of the IRMA by Official Charts. Chart rankings are based on sales, which are compiled through over-the-counter retail data captured electronically each day from retailers' EPOS systems. While album charts were compiled prior to 1992 in Ireland, these charts are incomplete and unreliable, as they were based on the supply to the retailer rather than consumer sales.

== List ==
- 2003
- 2004
- 2005
- 2006
- 2007
- 2008
- 2009
- 2010
- 2011
- 2012
- 2013
- 2014
- 2015
- 2016
- 2017
- 2018
- 2019
- 2020
- 2021
- 2022
- 2023
- 2024
- 2025
- 2026
