= List of number-one albums of 2008 (Ireland) =

These are the Irish Recorded Music Association's number one albums of 2008, per the Top 100 Individual Artist Albums chart.

Issue date	Album	Artist
3 January	In Rainbows	Radiohead
10 January	Call Me Irresponsible	Michael Bublé
17 January	Back to Black	Amy Winehouse
25 January	Good Girl Gone Bad	Rihanna
31 January	Skybound	Tom Baxter
7 February	Sleep Through the Static	Jack Johnson
14 February	Sleep Through the Static	Jack Johnson
21 February	Back to Black	Amy Winehouse
28 February	Once (Soundtrack)	Soundtrack
6 March	Rockferry	Duffy
13 March	Rockferry	Duffy
20 March	25 Years - 25 Songs	Mary Black
27 March	25 Years - 25 Songs	Mary Black
3 April	Accelerate	R.E.M.
10 April	25 Years - 25 Songs	Mary Black
17 April	25 Years - 25 Songs	Mary Black
1 May	Hard Candy	Madonna
8 May	The Two of Us	Christie Hennessy
15 May	The Two of Us	Christie Hennessy
22 May	The Galway Girl - The Best Of	Sharon Shannon
29 May	The Galway Girl - The Best Of	Sharon Shannon
5 June	Radiohead: The Best Of	Radiohead
12 June	Radiohead: The Best Of	Radiohead
19 June	Viva la Vida or Death and All His Friends	Coldplay
26 June	Viva la Vida or Death and All His Friends	Coldplay
3 July	Viva la Vida or Death and All His Friends	Coldplay
10 July	Viva la Vida or Death and All His Friends	Coldplay
17 July	Viva la Vida or Death and All His Friends	Coldplay
24 July	Viva la Vida or Death and All His Friends	Coldplay
31 July	Viva la Vida or Death and All His Friends	Coldplay
7 August	ABBA Gold: Greatest Hits	ABBA
14 August	The Script	The Script
21 August	The Script	The Script
28 August	The Script	The Script
4 September	The Script	The Script
11 September	The Script	The Script
18 September	Death Magnetic	Metallica
25 September	Only by the Night	Kings of Leon
2 October	Only by the Night	Kings of Leon
9 October	Only by the Night	Kings of Leon
16 October	Only by the Night	Kings of Leon
23 October	Black Ice	AC/DC
31 October	A Hundred Million Suns	Snow Patrol
7 November	A Hundred Million Suns	Snow Patrol
14 November	My Love: Essential Collection	Celine Dion
21 November	The Priests	The Priests
28 November	Day & Age	The Killers
5 December	The Priests	The Priests
12 December	The Circus	Take That
19 December	The Circus	Take That
26 December	The Circus	Take That

== See also ==
- 2008 in music
- List of number-one albums (Ireland)
