= List of number-one albums of 2014 (Ireland) =

The Irish Albums Chart ranks the best-performing albums in Ireland, as compiled by Chart-Track on behalf of the Irish Recorded Music Association.

Issue date	Album	Artist	Reference
2 January	Halcyon/Halcyon Days	Ellie Goulding	
9 January	Halcyon/Halcyon Days	Ellie Goulding	
16 January	High Hopes	Bruce Springsteen	
23 January	High Hopes	Bruce Springsteen	
30 January	Halcyon/Halcyon Days	Ellie Goulding	
6 February	Halcyon/Halcyon Days	Ellie Goulding	
13 February	Halcyon/Halcyon Days	Ellie Goulding	
20 February	It's All Good – The Best of Damien Dempsey	Damien Dempsey	
27 February	Halcyon/Halcyon Days	Ellie Goulding	
6 March	The Wagon Wheel Show Live	Nathan Carter	
13 March	The Take Off and Landing of Everything	Elbow	
20 March	In a Perfect World	Kodaline	
27 March	Symphonica	George Michael	
3 April	In a Perfect World	Kodaline	
10 April	Getting Through	The Riptide Movement	
17 April	Caustic Love	Paolo Nutini	
24 April	Caustic Love	Paolo Nutini	
1 May	Tribal	Imelda May	
8 May	Tribal	Imelda May	
15 May	By the Rule	Mick Flannery	
22 May	Ghost Stories	Coldplay	
29 May	Ghost Stories	Coldplay	
5 June	Ghost Stories	Coldplay	
12 June	Ghost Stories	Coldplay	
19 June	The Ultimate Hits	Garth Brooks	
26 June	×	Ed Sheeran	
3 July	5 Seconds of Summer	5 Seconds of Summer	
10 July	The Ultimate Hits	Garth Brooks	
17 July	The Ultimate Hits	Garth Brooks	
24 July	The Ultimate Hits	Garth Brooks	
31 July	The Ultimate Hits	Garth Brooks	
7 August	×	Ed Sheeran	
14 August	I'm Not Bossy, I'm the Boss	Sinéad O'Connor	
21 August	×	Ed Sheeran	
28 August	Royal Blood	Royal Blood	
4 September	The Simple Things	Derek Ryan	
11 September	Lullaby and... The Ceaseless Roar	Robert Plant	
18 September	No Sound Without Silence	The Script	
25 September	Hozier	Hozier	
2 October	Hozier	Hozier	
9 October	Hozier	Hozier	
16 October	Hozier	Hozier	
23 October	Hozier	Hozier	
30 October	1989	Taylor Swift	
6 November	My Favourite Faded Fantasy	Damien Rice	
13 November	The Endless River	Pink Floyd	
20 November	Four	One Direction	
27 November	Four	One Direction	
4 December	×	Ed Sheeran	
11 December	×	Ed Sheeran	
18 December	×	Ed Sheeran	
25 December	×	Ed Sheeran	

== See also ==
- List of number-one singles of 2014 (Ireland)
