= Life Love Flesh Blood =

2017 album by Irish singer Imelda May

Studio album by Imelda May
- Released: 7 April 2017
- Recorded: Late 2015
- Studios: Village Studios (Los Angeles, California)
- Genres: Soft rock; soul; jazz
- Length: 44:05
- Label: Decca
- Producers: T Bone Burnett; Cam Blackwood

Imelda May chronology
Tribal (2014)	Life Love Flesh Blood (2017)	11 Past the Hour (2021)

Singles from Life Love Flesh Blood
- 1. "Call Me" Released: 18 November 2016; 2. "Black Tears" Released: 27 January 2017; 3. "Should've Been You" Released: 4 April 2017

Life Love Flesh Blood is the fifth studio album by Irish singer-songwriter Imelda May. It was first released in the Republic of Ireland on 7 April 2017, through label Decca Records, followed by a worldwide release two weeks later on 21 April 2017. The album, a follow-up to May's previous album Tribal (2014), was created in collaboration with American musician T Bone Burnett. Serving as the primary producer for the record, Burnett was only credited alongside Scottish producer Cam Blackwood. Blackwood produced a duet version of the album's lead single "Call Me", recorded with English vocalist Jack Savoretti, included on streaming editions of the album post-release. Throughout the album's creative process, May received guidance from Irish musician Bono, of rock group U2. The album followed May's divorce from guitarist Darrel Higham, influencing many lyrical themes on the album. Life Love Flesh Blood features soft rock and acoustic styles, differing significantly from the rockabilly genre of previous albums.

Commercially, the album peaked at number two on the Irish Albums Chart (IRMA), prevented from reaching number one by Ed Sheeran's album ÷. The album reached number one on the UK Americana chart, where it remained for three weeks, consequently preventing American musician Chris Stapleton from topping the chart with his album From A Room: Volume 1. Three singles were released from the album: "Call Me", "Black Tears", and "Should've Been You". The album also features guest appearances by pianist Jools Holland and guitarist Jeff Beck. In support of the album, May embarked on an international concert tour, beginning May 2017.

== Background and development ==
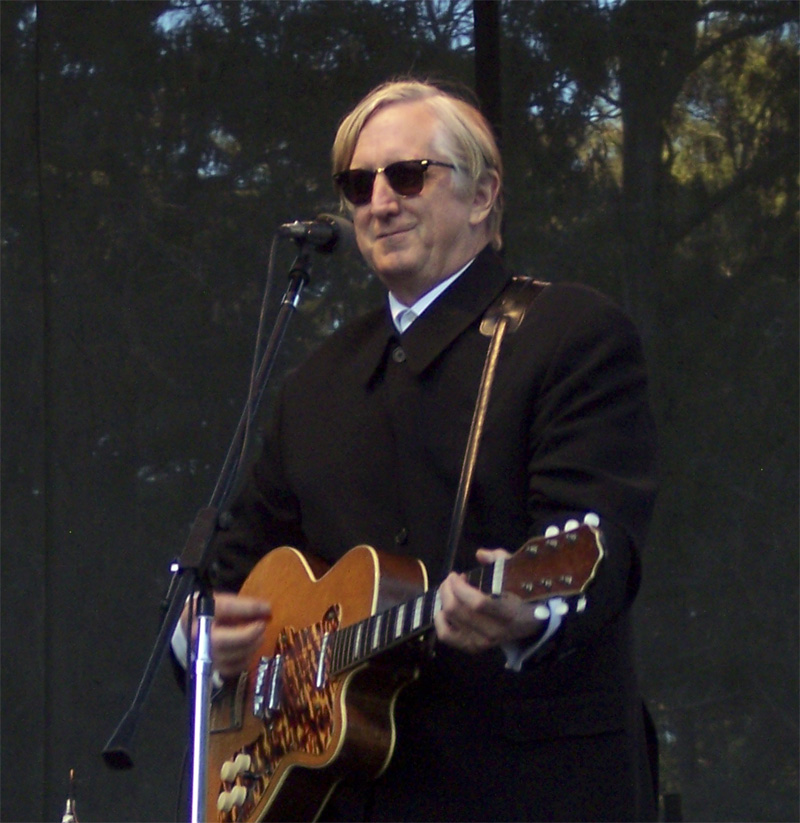
May enlisted American musician T Bone Burnett (pictured) to serve as the album's main producer.

To critical acclaim, May released her previous album, Tribal, on 25 April 2014. In July 2015, May announced that she had split from her husband, guitarist Darrel Higham. He served as her creative partner and collaborator for most of her previous albums. Following their divorce, Higham also quit May's band. The break-up influenced many of the themes on the album, but also gave May the courage to depart from her previous rockabilly genre. In a July 2015 interview with the Irish Independent, May confirmed that she had started working on the album, and that the release was slated for early 2016. After being postponed, the album was finally announced in November 2016, scheduled to be released on 31 March 2017. However, the album was delayed by a week in May's home-country the Republic of Ireland, and rescheduled to 21 April 2017 elsewhere.

The album was recorded over the course of seven days, in the city of Los Angeles. Some of the album's songs, such as "Black Tears", were written in the U.S. city of Nashville. Burnett introduced May to a small studio band, which consisted of himself and Marc Ribot on guitars, Dennis Crouch on bass, Jay Bellerose on drums, and Patrick Warren on keyboards.

== Title, package, and artwork ==
May explains why she named the album Life Love Flesh Blood in an interview with Irish magazine VIP: "There are some heartbreak songs on there but then I fell in love again, and had my heart broken again, I was up and down so I write about love and lust and guilt and joy and my family and my child and getting older or getting younger mentally. I wrote about everything, which is why I called the album Life Love Flesh Blood". Photography and creative design for the album were handled by Roger Deckker and Eddie Otchere-Dhagren. Five different packages of the album exist: standard edition, deluxe CD, deluxe download, HMV.com exclusive edition, and a heavyweight vinyl pressing. The deluxe CD is accompanied by a 36-page hardcover book, and signed copies were available on May's website. The HMV.com exclusive edition features two ukulele cover tracks: "It Must Be Love" by Labi Siffre, and "All I Want Is You" by U2.

== Promotion ==
"Call Me" was released as the album's lead single on 18 November 2016. May appeared on the 2016-17 edition of the New Year's Eve program Jools' Annual Hootenanny, where she performed the song "Black Tears". On 5 April 2017, May performed the third single from the album, "Should've Been You" on The One Show. On 7 April 2017, May was interviewed by Ryan Tubridy on the Irish chat show The Late Late Show.

== Critical reception ==
Professional ratings
Aggregate scores
Source	Rating
AnyDecentMusic?	7.4/10
Metacritic	73/100
Review scores
Source	Rating
AllMusic	4.5/5 stars
The Arts Desk	4/5 stars
Evening Standard	4/5 stars
The Guardian	3/5 stars
The Independent	4/5 stars
The Irish Times	4/5 stars
Mojo	3/5 stars
Paste	4.1/5 stars
Q	4/5 stars
Spectrum Culture	3/5 stars
Uncut	3/5 stars

Life Love Flesh Blood received generally positive reviews from critics. At Metacritic, which assigns a normalized rating out of 100 to reviews from mainstream critics, the album received an average score of 73, which indicates "generally favourable reviews". Seven professional reviews were used to calculate the rating. Ben Beaumont-Thomas from The Guardian rated the album 3 out of 5 stars, and commented that "the songwriting is rock solid, and in an age of will-this-do toplines, her melodic touch should not be undervalued; take 6ixth Sense, which has a satisfying direction to its doo-wop tinged meandering". Tony Clayton-Lea from The Irish Times praised May's career reinvention, saying that her "former music stylings have mostly been replaced with elegant, reflective readings from the soul/blues/jazz/pop songbook, and they fit her like a long satin glove".

In a positive review, Rick Pearson from the Evening Standard praised the "bluesy" ballads on the album - "Call Me" and "Black Tears". He commented that they "throb with emotion", and that her vocals were reminiscent of Eva Cassidy at points. Lee Zimmerman of Paste lauded the eclectic genres on the album, saying that "it’s little wonder then that May’s come-hither desire becomes the central theme, with the music providing the appropriate cushion to buttress her intents. It’s mostly twilight jazz, but varied enough to wander to an occasional tango ("I Choose Love"), Van Morrison-like balladry ("Call Me") or far more edgier intents ("Leave Me Lonely", "Game Changer")".

== Commercial performance ==
Life Love Flesh Blood debuted at number two on the Irish Albums Chart on 14 April 2017, as published by the IRMA. In the United Kingdom, the album debuted at five on the UK Albums Chart, as published by the Official Charts Company. The album was May's third album to enter the top ten of the chart. The album reached number one on the UK Americana Albums chart and was the best-selling Americana album by a UK artist in 2017. In Scotland, the album debuted at four. The album was prevented from reaching number one, as it fell behind Ed Sheeran's third album, ÷. In Belgium, the album charted at 60 and 69 on the Flanders and Wallonia Ultratop charts, respectively.

== Track listing ==
All tracks produced by T Bone Burnett, except where noted.

Life Love Flesh Blood – Standard edition
No.	Title	Writer(s)	Length
1.	"Call Me"	Imelda May; Patrick Davis	3:27
2.	"Black Tears" (featuring Jeff Beck)	May; Angelo Petraglia	4:03
3.	"Should've Been You"	May	3:38
4.	"Sixth Sense"	May; Paul Moak	4:14
5.	"Human"	May	3:40
6.	"How Bad Can a Good Girl Be"	May	3:27
7.	"Bad Habit"	May	4:42
8.	"Levitate"	May	3:33
9.	"When It's My Time" (featuring Jools Holland)	May	5:16
10.	"Leave Me Lonely"	May; Davis	4:01
11.	"The Girl I Used to Be"	May; Moak	4:04
Total length:			44:05

Life Love Flesh Blood – Deluxe edition
No.	Title	Writer(s)	Length
12.	"The Longing"	May; Joseph Burnett	5:38
13.	"Flesh and Blood"	May	3:25
14.	"Game Changer"	May; Moak	3:35
15.	"Love and Fear"	May; Jimmy Hogarth	4:00
Total length:			60:43

Life Love Flesh Blood – HMV.com exclusive edition
No.	Title	Writer(s)	Length
16.	"It Must Be Love" (ukulele)	Labi Siffre	2:52
17.	"All I Want Is You" (ukulele)	Paul David Hewson	4:35
Total length:			1:08:10

Life Love Flesh Blood – Japanese deluxe edition (bonus track)
No.	Title	Writer(s)	Length
12.	"Bang Bang" (ukulele)	Sonny Bono

Life Love Flesh Blood – Streaming editions (bonus track)
No.	Title	Writer(s)	Producer	Length
16.	"Call Me" (with Jack Savoretti)	May; Davis	Cam Blackwood	2:55
Total length:				1:03:38

== Personnel ==
Credits adapted from Life Love Flesh Blood liner notes.

=== Music ===
- Jeff Beck – guitar (track 2)
- Jay Bellerose – drums (all tracks)
- Cam Blackwood – music production (track 16)
- Bono – mentoring and guidance
- T Bone Burnett – music production (all tracks), guitar (tracks 2, 3, 5, 7, 9–11)
- Billy Centenaro – second engineering (all tracks)
- Eli Crews – additional engineering (all tracks)
- Dennis Crouch – acoustic bass (tracks 2, 4, 8–10)
- Zachary Dawes – electric bass (tracks 1, 3–8, 10–15)
- Jools Holland – piano (track 9)
- Kylie Kempster – production assistance
- Curtis Laur – equipment technician
- Darrell Leonard – horns arrangement (all tracks), horn (track 2)
- Zach Lizzio – second engineering (all tracks)
- Gavin Lurssen – mastering (all tracks)
- Imelda May – vocals (all tracks), background vocals (all tracks), background vocal arrangement (all tracks)
- Vanessa Parr – second engineering (all tracks)
- Marc Ribot – guitar (all tracks), ukulele (track 11)
- Jack Savoretti – vocals (track 16)
- Patrick Warren – keyboards (tracks 1–8, 10–15), keyboard arrangement (all tracks), recording arrangement (all tracks)
- Chris Wilkinson – additional engineering (all tracks)
- Carl Wheeler – Hammond organ (track 9)
- Jason Wormer – mixing (all tracks), recording (all tracks)

=== Band ===
- Ryan Aston
- Sean Barry
- Oliver Darling
- Gavin Fitzjohn
- Al Gare
- Petur Hallgrimsson
- Donny Little
- Emma Osei-Lah
- Chris Pemberton
- Dave Priseman
- Steve Ruston
- Ulrika Uma

=== Touring band ===
- Fran Bemrose
- Nidge Dobson
- Trevor Gilligan
- James O'Neill
- Nigel Reavill
- Brett Spence
- Gerry Wilkes

=== Business ===
- T Bone Burnett – executive production
- Nigel Hassler – A&R
- Ken Levitan – management
- Imelda May – executive production
- Peter Rudge – management
- Ivy Skoff – production coordination
- Marsha Vlasic – A&R

=== Packaging ===
- Roger Deckker – photography, design (pages 2–4, 6–9, 12–17)
- Max Dodson – photography
- Lisa Mejuto – make-up
- Dee Moran – styling
- Eddie Otchere-Dhagren – design (pages 5, 10, 11, 18, 19)
- Craig Purves – hair
- Steve Stacey – design and art direction

== Charts ==
Chart (2017)	Peak position
Belgian Albums (Ultratop Flanders)	60
Belgian Albums (Ultratop Wallonia)	69
French Albums (SNEP)	151
Irish Albums (IRMA)	2
New Zealand Heatseekers Albums (RMNZ)	1
Scottish Albums (Official Charts)	4
Swiss Albums (Schweizer Hitparade)	33
UK Albums (Official Charts)	5

== Certifications ==
Region	Certification	Certified units/sales
United Kingdom (BPI)	Silver	60,000^{‡}
^{‡} Sales+streaming figures based on certification alone.

== Release history ==
List of release dates, showing region, format, and label
Region	Date	Format(s)	Label(s)
Ireland	7 April 2017	Digital download; streaming; CD; vinyl	Decca Records
Worldwide	21 April 2017	Digital download; streaming; CD; vinyl	Decca Records
