= List of number-one singles of 2014 (Ireland) =

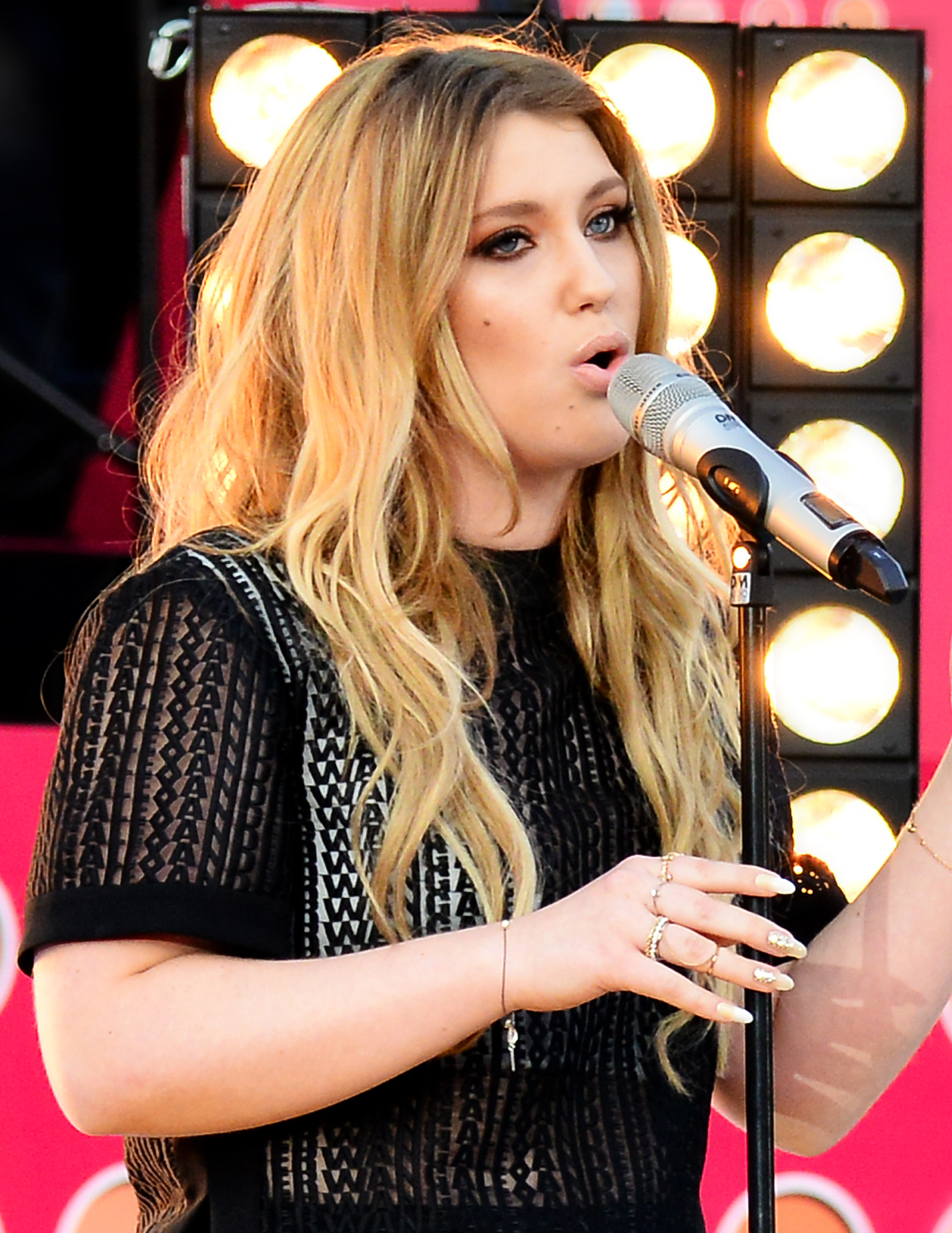
X Factor contestant Ella Henderson hit number one with her debut single Ghost.

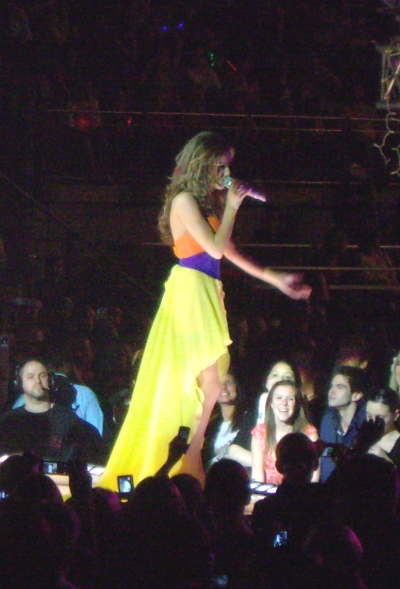
Cheryl Cole gained her fourth number one with Crazy Stupid Love.

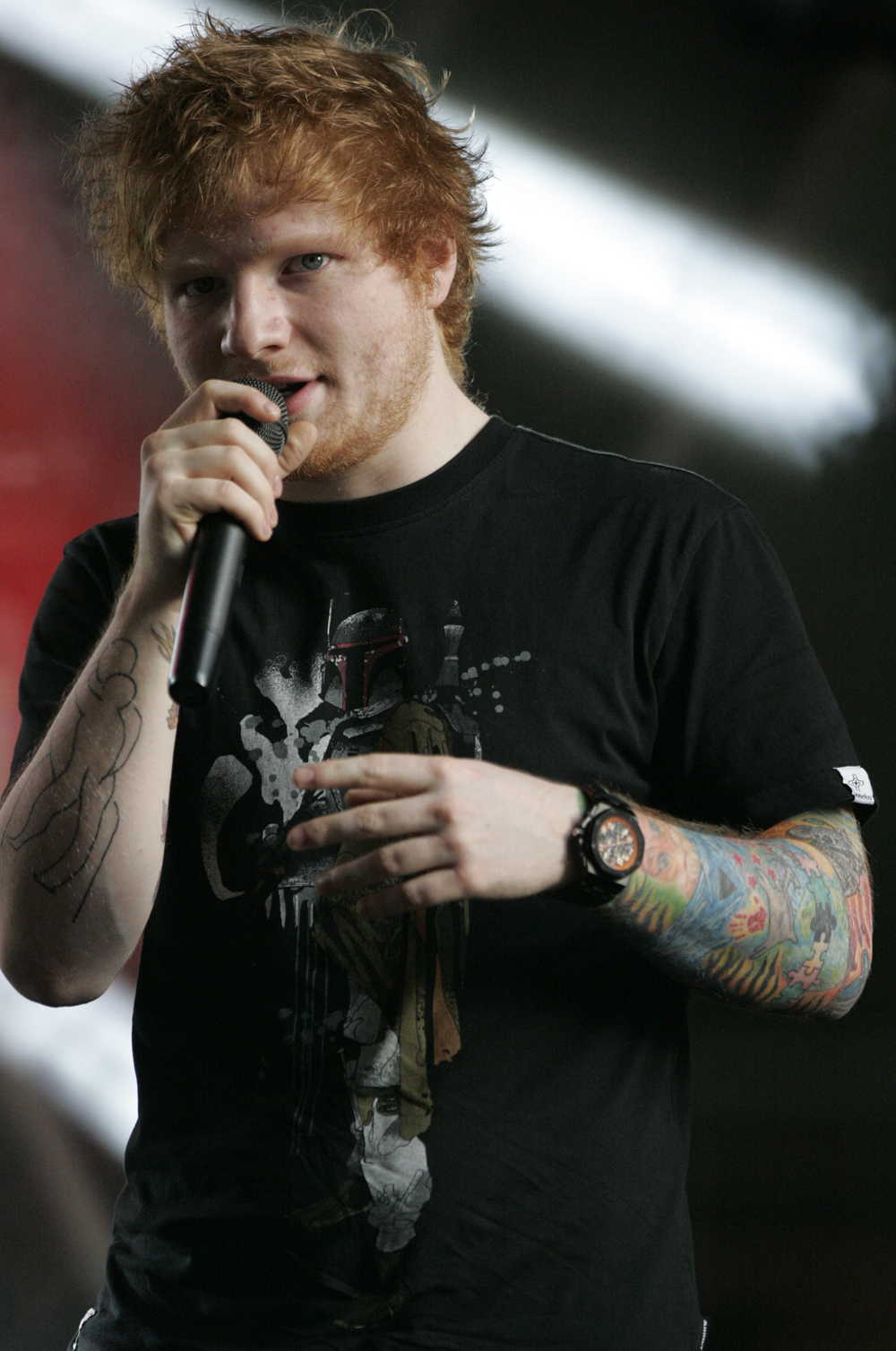
Ed Sheeran gained his first two number one hits with Sing and Thinking Out Loud.

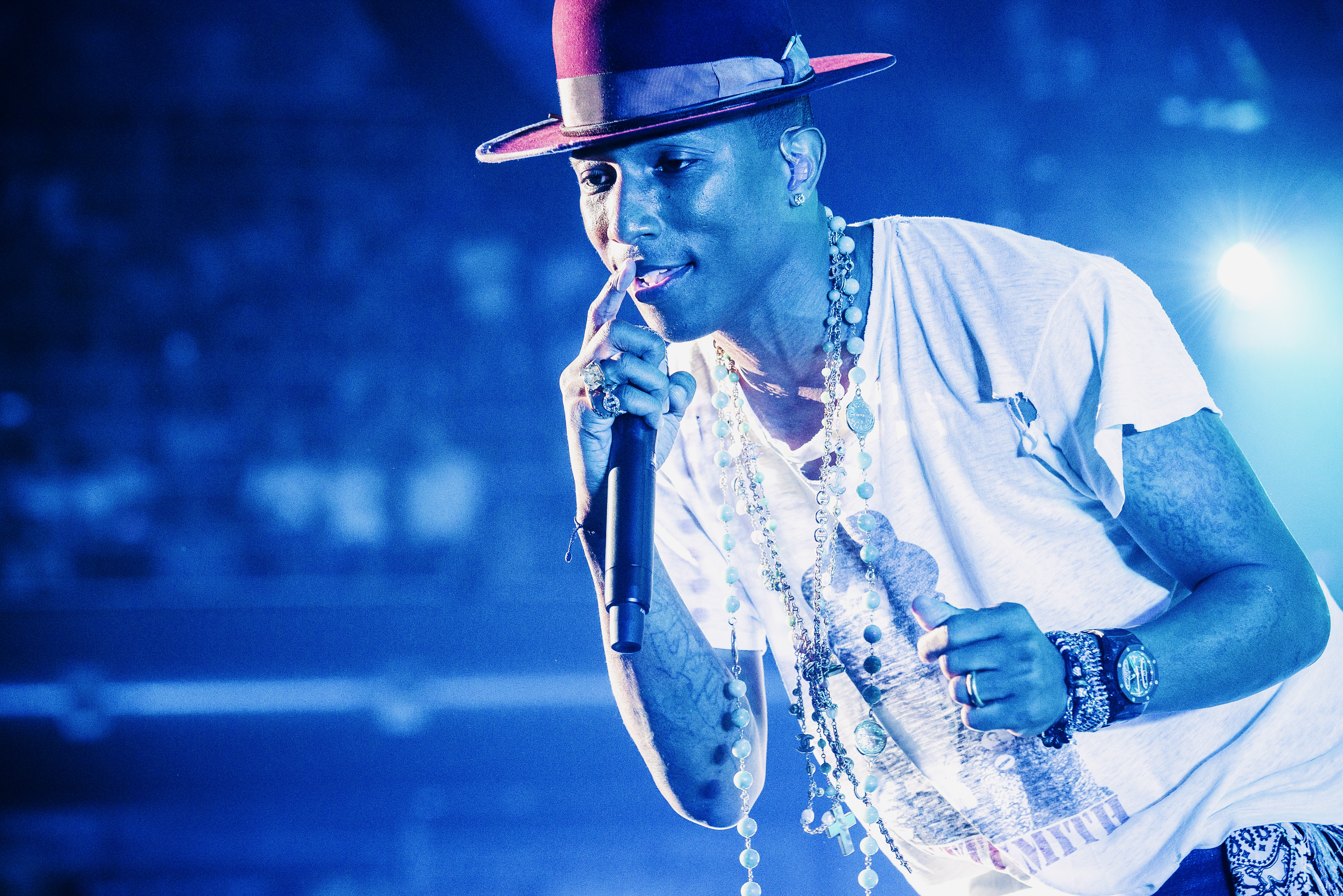
Pharrell Williams second number one single Happy spent 12 weeks at the top the spot

The Irish Singles Chart ranks the best-performing singles in Ireland, as compiled by Chart-Track on behalf of the Irish Recorded Music Association.

Issue date	Song	Artist	Reference
2 January	"Happy"	Pharrell Williams	
9 January	"Happy"	Pharrell Williams	
16 January	"Happy"	Pharrell Williams	
23 January	"Happy"	Pharrell Williams	
30 January	"Happy"	Pharrell Williams	
6 February	"Happy"	Pharrell Williams	
13 February	"Happy"	Pharrell Williams	
20 February	"Rather Be"	Clean Bandit featuring Jess Glynne	
27 February	"Rather Be"	Clean Bandit featuring Jess Glynne	
6 March	"Happy"	Pharrell Williams	
13 March	"Happy"	Pharrell Williams	
20 March	"I Got U"	Duke Dumont featuring Jax Jones	
27 March	"She Looks So Perfect"	5 Seconds of Summer	
3 April	"Happy"	Pharrell Williams	
10 April	"Happy"	Pharrell Williams	
17 April	"Happy"	Pharrell Williams	
24 April	"All of Me"	John Legend	
1 May	"Summer"	Calvin Harris	
8 May	"All of Me"	John Legend	
15 May	"Sing"	Ed Sheeran	
22 May	"Stay with Me"	Sam Smith	
29 May	"Stay with Me"	Sam Smith	
5 June	"Stay with Me"	Sam Smith	
12 June	"Ghost"	Ella Henderson	
19 June	"Don't Stop"	5 Seconds of Summer	
26 June	"Ghost"	Ella Henderson	
3 July	"Problem"	Ariana Grande featuring Iggy Azalea	
10 July	"Ghost"	Ella Henderson	
17 July	"Ghost"	Ella Henderson	
24 July	"Crazy Stupid Love"	Cheryl Cole featuring Tinie Tempah	
31 July	"Ghost"	Ella Henderson	
7 August	"Ghost"	Ella Henderson	
14 August	"Stolen Dance"	Milky Chance	
21 August	"Stolen Dance"	Milky Chance	
28 August	"Prayer in C"	Lilly Wood and the Prick and Robin Schulz	
4 September	"Superheroes"	The Script	
11 September	"Prayer in C"	Lilly Wood and the Prick and Robin Schulz	
18 September	"Prayer in C"	Lilly Wood and the Prick and Robin Schulz	
25 September	"Prayer in C"	Lilly Wood and the Prick and Robin Schulz	
2 October	"All About That Bass"	Meghan Trainor	
9 October	"All About That Bass"	Meghan Trainor	
16 October	"All About That Bass"	Meghan Trainor	
23 October	"All About That Bass"	Meghan Trainor	
30 October	"Thinking Out Loud"	Ed Sheeran	
6 November	"Thinking Out Loud"	Ed Sheeran	
13 November	"Thinking Out Loud"	Ed Sheeran	
20 November	"Do They Know It's Christmas? (2014)"	Band Aid 30	
27 November	"Do They Know It's Christmas? (2014)"	Band Aid 30	
4 December	"Where I Belong"	Hometown	
11 December	"Do They Know It's Christmas? (2014)"	Band Aid 30	
18 December	"Uptown Funk"	Mark Ronson featuring Bruno Mars	
25 December	"Uptown Funk"	Mark Ronson featuring Bruno Mars	

== Number-one artists ==
Position	Artist	Weeks at No. 1
1	Pharrell Williams	12
2	Ella Henderson	6
3	Lilly Wood and the Prick	4
3	Robin Schulz	4
3	Meghan Trainor	4
3	Ed Sheeran	4
7	Band Aid 30	3
7	Sam Smith	3
9	Clean Bandit	2
9	Jess Glynne	2
9	John Legend	2
9	5 Seconds of Summer	2
9	Milky Chance	2
9	Mark Ronson	2
9	Bruno Mars	2
16	Duke Dumont	1
16	Jax Jones	1
16	Calvin Harris	1
16	Ariana Grande	1
16	Iggy Azalea	1
16	Cheryl Cole	1
16	Tinie Tempah	1
16	The Script	1
16	Hometown	1

== See also ==
- List of number-one albums of 2014 (Ireland)
