= List of number-one albums of 2003 (Ireland) =

These are the Irish Recorded Music Association's number one albums of 2003, per the Top 100 Individual Artist Albums chart.

Issue date	Album	Artist
2 January	Let Go	Avril Lavigne
9 January	Missundaztood	Pink
16 January	Let Go	Avril Lavigne
23 January	Let Go	Avril Lavigne
30 January	Justified	Justin Timberlake
6 February	Justified	Justin Timberlake
13 February	100th Window	Massive Attack
20 February	Come Away with Me	Norah Jones
27 February	Come Away with Me	Norah Jones
6 March	Come Away with Me	Norah Jones
13 March	Come Away with Me	Norah Jones
20 March	Come Away with Me	Norah Jones
27 March	Meteora	Linkin Park
3 April	Come Away with Me	Norah Jones
10 April	Come Away with Me	Norah Jones
17 April	Come Away with Me	Norah Jones
24 April	Come Away with Me	Norah Jones
1 May	Justified	Justin Timberlake
8 May	Justified	Justin Timberlake
15 May	Justified	Justin Timberlake
22 May	Set List	The Frames
29 May	Set List	The Frames
3 June	You Gotta Go There to Come Back	Stereophonics
12 June	Hail to the Thief	Radiohead
19 June	St. Anger	Metallica
26 June	Dangerously in Love	Beyoncé
3 July	So Much for the City	The Thrills
10 July	So Much for the City	The Thrills
17 July	So Much for the City	The Thrills
24 July	So Much for the City	The Thrills
31 July	So Much for the City	The Thrills
7 August	So Much for the City	The Thrills
14 August	Sometimes Right, Sometimes Wrong	Mickey Joe Harte
21 August	Sometimes Right, Sometimes Wrong	Mickey Joe Harte
28 August	Sometimes Right, Sometimes Wrong	Mickey Joe Harte
4 September	So Much for the City	The Thrills
11 September	Square 1	David Kitt
18 September	Square 1	David Kitt
25 September	Square 1	David Kitt
2 October	Life for Rent	Dido
9 October	Life for Rent	Dido
16 October	Life for Rent	Dido
23 October	Life for Rent	Dido
30 October	In Time: The Best of R.E.M. 1988–2003	R.E.M.
6 November	In Time: The Best of R.E.M. 1988–2003	R.E.M.
13 November	In Time: The Best of R.E.M. 1988–2003	R.E.M.
20 November	In Time: The Best of R.E.M. 1988–2003	R.E.M.
27 November	Turnaround	Westlife
4 December	Turnaround	Westlife
11 December	Number Ones	Michael Jackson
18 December	Life for Rent	Dido
25 December	Life for Rent	Dido

== See also ==
- 2003 in music
- List of number-one albums (Ireland)
