= List of number-one albums of 2005 (Ireland) =

These are the Irish Recorded Music Association's number one albums of 2005, per the Top 100 Individual Artist Albums chart.

Issue date	Album	Artist
6 January	American Idiot	Green Day
13 January	American Idiot	Green Day
20 January	Hot Fuss	The Killers
27 January	Hot Fuss	The Killers
3 February	Hot Fuss	The Killers
10 February	Hot Fuss	The Killers
17 February	Hot Fuss	The Killers
24 February	Hot Fuss	The Killers
3 March	Hot Fuss	The Killers
10 March	The Massacre	50 Cent
17 March	Shots	Damien Dempsey
24 March	Language. Sex. Violence. Other?	Stereophonics
31 March	Hot Fuss	The Killers
7 April	Hot Fuss	The Killers
14 April	Hot Fuss	The Killers
21 April	Hot Fuss	The Killers
28 April	Devils & Dust	Bruce Springsteen
5 May	Devils & Dust	Bruce Springsteen
12 May	Devils & Dust	Bruce Springsteen
19 May	Forever Faithless - The Greatest Hits	Faithless
26 May	Forever Faithless - The Greatest Hits	Faithless
2 June	Don't Believe the Truth	Oasis
9 June	X&Y	Coldplay
16 June	X&Y	Coldplay
23 June	X&Y	Coldplay
30 June	Back to Bedlam	James Blunt
7 July	Back to Bedlam	James Blunt
14 July	Back to Bedlam	James Blunt
21 July	Back to Bedlam	James Blunt
28 July	Back to Bedlam	James Blunt
4 August	Back to Bedlam	James Blunt
11 August	Back to Bedlam	James Blunt
18 August	Back to Bedlam	James Blunt
25 August	Back to Bedlam	James Blunt
1 September	Back to Bedlam	James Blunt
8 September	Back to Bedlam	James Blunt
15 September	Life in Slow Motion	David Gray
22 September	Life in Slow Motion	David Gray
29 September	Life in Slow Motion	David Gray
6 October	Home	The Corrs
13 October	Back to Bedlam	James Blunt
20 October	Flock	Bell X1
27 October	Intensive Care	Robbie Williams
3 November	Face to Face	Westlife
10 November	Gift Crub 6 – The Special One	Mario Rosenstock
17 November	Gift Crub 6 – The Special One	Mario Rosenstock
24 November	Gift Crub 6 – The Special One	Mario Rosenstock
1 December	Gift Crub 6 – The Special One	Mario Rosenstock
8 December	Curtain Call: The Hits	Eminem
15 December	Curtain Call: The Hits	Eminem
22 December	Curtain Call: The Hits	Eminem
29 December	Curtain Call: The Hits	Eminem

== See also ==
- 2005 in music
- List of number-one albums (Ireland)
