= List of number-one albums of 2004 (Ireland) =

These are the Irish Recorded Music Association's number one albums of 2004, per the Top 100 Individual Artist Albums chart.

Issue date	Album	Artist
1 January	Life for Rent	Dido
8 January	Life for Rent	Dido
15 January	Life for Rent	Dido
22 January	Life for Rent	Dido
29 January	Talkie Walkie	Air
5 February	Talkie Walkie	Air
12 February	Feels like Home	Norah Jones
19 February	Feels like Home	Norah Jones
26 February	Feels like Home	Norah Jones
4 March	Come Away with Me	Norah Jones
11 March	Living	Paddy Casey
18 March	Greatest Hits	Guns N' Roses
25 March	Greatest Hits	Guns N' Roses
1 April	Greatest Hits	Guns N' Roses
8 April	Greatest Hits	Guns N' Roses
15 April	Greatest Hits	Guns N' Roses
22 April	Greatest Hits	Guns N' Roses
29 April	D12 World	D12
6 May	Greatest Hits	Guns N' Roses
13 May	A Grand Don't Come for Free	The Streets
20 May	Raining Down Arrows	Mundy
27 May	Under My Skin	Avril Lavigne
3 June	Borrowed Heaven	The Corrs
10 June	Live 2004	Planxty
17 June	Live 2004	Planxty
24 June	Live 2004	Planxty
1 July	A Grand Don't Come for Free	The Streets
8 July	Confessions	Usher
15 July	A Grand Don't Come for Free	The Streets
22 July	A Grand Don't Come for Free	The Streets
29 July	A Grand Don't Come for Free	The Streets
5 August	Scissor Sisters	Scissor Sisters
12 August	Final Straw	Snow Patrol
19 August	B-Sides	Damien Rice
26 August	Songs about Jane	Maroon 5
2 September	Songs about Jane	Maroon 5
9 September	Songs about Jane	Maroon 5
16 September	Let's Bottle Bohemia	The Thrills
23 September	Burn the Maps	The Frames
30 September	Burn the Maps	The Frames
7 October	Around the Sun	R.E.M.
14 October	Dreamed a Dream	George Murphy
21 October	Greatest Hits	Robbie Williams
28 October	Greatest Hits	Robbie Williams
4 November	Greatest Hits	Robbie Williams
11 November	Greatest Hits: My Prerogative	Britney Spears
22 November	Encore	Eminem
25 November	How to Dismantle an Atomic Bomb	U2
2 December	How to Dismantle an Atomic Bomb	U2
9 December	How to Dismantle an Atomic Bomb	U2
16 December	How to Dismantle an Atomic Bomb	U2
23 December	How to Dismantle an Atomic Bomb	U2
30 December	How to Dismantle an Atomic Bomb	U2

== See also ==
- 2004 in music
- List of number-one albums (Ireland)
