= Tribal (Imelda May album) =

Studio album by Imelda May
- Released: 25 April 2014
- Recorded: 2013 at Livingston Studios in London, England
- Genre: Rockabilly
- Length: 40:19
- Label: Decca
- Producer: Mike Crossey, Imelda May

Imelda May chronology
Mayhem (2010)	Tribal (2014)	Life Love Flesh Blood (2017)

Singles from Tribal
- 1. "It's Good to Be Alive" Released: 1 March 2014; 2. "Wild Woman" Released: 18 April 2014

Tribal is the fourth studio album by the Irish rockabilly musician Imelda May, released on 25 April 2014 on Decca Records.

Originally slated for a summer release, Tribal was recorded at Livingston Studios in London with producer Mike Crossey. The album features a more uptempo style of rockabilly in comparison to May's previous releases, with several critics drawing comparisons to the psychobilly punk band the Cramps and artists such as the B-52s. The album was supported by two singles: "It's Good to Be Alive" and "Wild Woman".

Upon its release, Tribal received generally favourable acclaim and placed in several international charts—including Ireland, where it debuted at number 1; the United Kingdom, where it peaked at number 3; and New Zealand, where it placed in the top 20.

== Release ==
Tribal was announced for release in early 2014. In the original announcement the album was planned for release in June 2014, although the official date was moved forward and Tribal was released on 25 April on Decca Records. The album was made available on CD, LP and as a digital download. Tribal is due to be released in the United States on 23 September on Verve Records.

Two singles were released from Tribal. Its lead single, "It's Good to Be Alive", was released on 1 March 2014; the song had debuted prior to its official release when May performed it on the Tonight Show with Jay Leno in November 2013. The album's second supporting single, "Wild Woman", was released on 18 April 2014.

== Reception ==
Professional ratings
Aggregate scores
Source	Rating
Metacritic	71/100
Review scores
Source	Rating
AllMusic	3.5/5 stars
The Guardian	4/5 stars
Hot Press	3.5/5 stars
The Independent	3/5 stars
The Irish Times	4/5 stars
Magnet	6.5/10
Mojo	3/5 stars
The Observer	3/5 stars
PopMatters	7/10
State	4/5 stars

Upon its release, Tribal received largely positive acclaim from critics. At Metacritic, which assigns a normalised rating out of 100 to reviews from mainstream critics, the album received an average score of 71, based on 11 reviews, indicating "generally favourable reviews". AllMusic writer Matt Collar awarded Tribal three-and-a-half out of five stars and referred to the album as her "call to arms; her statement of purpose", comparing it to material by Bow Wow Wow, the Cramps and the B-52s. Writing for the Guardian, Caroline Sullivan said that "in May's hands, rockabilly is a feral form, vitally alive and compelling" and surmised that "[Tribal] is no time capsule; it's fresh and bracing" in her four out of five star review. In a three-star review for the Independent, Andy Gill noted that on Tribal May is "still indulging the boisterous rapscallion character suggested by titles like 'Wild Woman', 'Hellfire Club' and 'Gypsy In Me'", adding that "there's sweetness to balance the earthier aspects". Hot Press rated the album three-and-a-half out of five stars.

The Irish Times' reviewer Tony Clayton-Lea describe the Tribal as "an astute mix of signature creative riffs … blending film noir-like theme songs with burning and emotive torch ballads", rating the album four out of five stars. Phil Mongredien of the Observer was more critical towards the album writing in his review that although "May [is] an engaging and entertaining storyteller on the more breakneck material", her performance on the album's ballads and low-tempo tracks "are less distinguished" and "more delicate than memorable". He awarded the album three out of five stars. PopMatters writer Steve Horowitz said in a seven out of ten review that May "ferociously attacks the lyrics" on Tribal, "growling and stuttering as needed to reveal the urgency exploding inside of her. Meanwhile, the guitars swirl and the drums pound to create the whirlwind in which May operates." Rating the album four of five in State, Graham Mooney concluded that "with Tribal, Imelda May continues to impress and surprise in equal measure" and referred to the album as "the strongest collection of songs [she] has assembled to date."

== Track listing ==
No.	Title	Length
1.	"Tribal"	3:00
2.	"Wild Woman"	2:32
3.	"It's Good to Be Alive"	3:49
4.	"Gypsy in Me"	4:34
5.	"Little Pixie"	3:38
6.	"Hellfire Club"	3:25
7.	"Five Good Men"	2:41
8.	"Ghost of Love"	3:39
9.	"Wicked Way"	3:50
10.	"Round the Bend"	3:06
11.	"I Wanna Dance"	2:52
12.	"Right Amount of Wrong"	3:15
Total length:		40:28

Deluxe edition bonus tracks
No.	Title	Length
13.	"Tears of Clew Bay"	3:18
14.	"Get ready (featuring Smokey Robinson)"	3:11
15.	"Zombie Girl"	4:15
16.	"Amber Eyes"	2:28
17.	"Dreaming" (Ukulele track)	2:53
18.	"Beautiful Day"	3:52
Total length:		60:28

== Personnel ==
All personnel credits adapted from Tribal's album notes.

The Imelda May Band

- Imelda May
- Darrel Higham
- Al Gare
- Steve Rushton
- Dave Priseman

Technical personnel

- Mike Crossey – production, programming
- Imelda May – production
- Jonathan Gilmore – engineering
- Graham Dominey – engineering
- Guy Davie – mastering

Design personnel

- Stylorouge – art direction, design
- Barry McCall – photography
- Rob O'Connor – photography

== Chart positions ==
Chart (2014)	Peak position
Belgian Albums Chart (Flanders)	172
Belgian Albums Chart (Wallonia)	186
French Albums Chart	133
Irish Albums Chart	1
New Zealand Albums Chart	17
Spanish Albums Chart	81
UK Albums Chart	3

== See also ==
- List of 2014 albums
- List of number-one albums of 2014 (Ireland)
- List of UK top-ten albums in 2014
