= List of number-one albums of 2007 (Ireland) =

These are the Irish Recorded Music Association's number one albums of 2007, per the Top 100 Individual Artist Albums chart.

Issue date	Album	Artist
2 January	U218 Singles	U2
9 January	Eyes Open	Snow Patrol
16 January	Eyes Open	Snow Patrol
23 January	Eyes Open	Snow Patrol
30 January	Eyes Open	Snow Patrol
6 February	Eyes Open	Snow Patrol
13 February	Eyes Open	Snow Patrol
20 February	Eyes Open	Snow Patrol
27 February	Beautiful World	Take That
6 March	Neon Bible	Arcade Fire
13 March	Everytime We Touch	Cascada
20 March	Everytime We Touch	Cascada
27 March	Everytime We Touch	Cascada
3 April	Everytime We Touch	Cascada
10 April	Everytime We Touch	Cascada
17 April	The Best Damn Thing	Avril Lavigne
24 April	Favourite Worst Nightmare	Arctic Monkeys
1 May	Favourite Worst Nightmare	Arctic Monkeys
8 May	Favourite Worst Nightmare	Arctic Monkeys
15 May	Minutes to Midnight	Linkin Park
22 May	Minutes to Midnight	Linkin Park
29 May	So Real: Songs From Jeff Buckley	Jeff Buckley
5 June	Bruce Springsteen with The Sessions Band: Live in Dublin	Bruce Springsteen
12 June	The Traveling Wilburys Collection	Traveling Wilburys
19 June	The Traveling Wilburys Collection	Traveling Wilburys
26 June	The Traveling Wilburys Collection	Traveling Wilburys
3 July	Good Girl Gone Bad	Rihanna
10 July	Our Love to Admire	Interpol
17 July	One Chance	Paul Potts
24 July	One Chance	Paul Potts
31 July	Shock Value	Timbaland
7 August	Shock Value	Timbaland
14 August	Because of the Times	Kings of Leon
21 August	Shock Value	Timbaland
28 August	Shock Value	Timbaland
4 September	Shock Value	Timbaland
11 September	Curtis	50 Cent
18 September	All the Lost Souls	James Blunt
25 September	All the Lost Souls	James Blunt
2 October	Magic	Bruce Springsteen
9 October	Magic	Bruce Springsteen
16 October	Magic	Bruce Springsteen
23 October	Magic	Bruce Springsteen
30 October	Blackout	Britney Spears
6 November	Back Home	Westlife
13 November	Spirit	Leona Lewis
20 November	Spirit	Leona Lewis
27 November	Breathless	Shayne Ward
4 December	Breathless	Shayne Ward
11 December	Breathless	Shayne Ward
18 December	Call Me Irresponsible	Michael Bublé
25 December	Call Me Irresponsible	Michael Bublé

== See also ==
- 2007 in music
- List of number-one albums (Ireland)
