= List of number-one albums of 2006 (Ireland) =

These are the Irish Recorded Music Association's number one albums of 2006, per the Top 100 Individual Artist Albums chart.

| Issue date | Album | Artist |
|---|---|---|
| 5 January | Breakaway | Kelly Clarkson |
| 12 January | Back to Bedlam | James Blunt |
| 19 January | Back to Bedlam | James Blunt |
| 29 January | Whatever People Say I Am, That's What I'm Not | Arctic Monkeys |
| 2 February | Whatever People Say I Am, That's What I'm Not | Arctic Monkeys |
| 9 February | Whatever People Say I Am, That's What I'm Not | Arctic Monkeys |
| 16 February | Ring of Fire: The Legend of Johnny Cash | Johnny Cash |
| 23 February | Rodrigo y Gabriela | Rodrigo y Gabriela |
| 2 March | Ring of Fire: The Legend of Johnny Cash | Johnny Cash |
| 9 March | Ring of Fire: The Legend of Johnny Cash | Johnny Cash |
| 16 March | Ring of Fire: The Legend of Johnny Cash | Johnny Cash |
| 23 March | The Impossible Dream | Andy Abraham |
| 30 March | The Impossible Dream | Andy Abraham |
| 6 April | Collected | Massive Attack |
| 13 April | Live at the Point | Christy Moore |
| 20 April | Shayne Ward | Shayne Ward |
| 27 April | Shayne Ward | Shayne Ward |
| 4 May | Eyes Open | Snow Patrol |
| 11 May | Stadium Arcadium | Red Hot Chili Peppers |
| 18 May | Stadium Arcadium | Red Hot Chili Peppers |
| 25 May | Stadium Arcadium | Red Hot Chili Peppers |
| 1 June | Stadium Arcadium | Red Hot Chili Peppers |
| 8 June | Stadium Arcadium | Red Hot Chili Peppers |
| 15 June | Under the Iron Sea | Keane |
| 22 June | Smile... It Confuses People | Sandi Thom |
| 29 June | The Greatest Hits - Why Try Harder | Fatboy Slim |
| 6 July | Black Holes and Revelations | Muse |
| 13 July | American V: A Hundred Highways | Johnny Cash |
| 20 July | American V: A Hundred Highways | Johnny Cash |
| 27 July | Piano Man: The Very Best of | Billy Joel |
| 3 August | Piano Man: The Very Best of | Billy Joel |
| 10 August | Eyes Open | Snow Patrol |
| 17 August | Back to Basics | Christina Aguilera |
| 24 August | Eyes Open | Snow Patrol |
| 31 August | Modern Times | Bob Dylan |
| 7 September | Eyes Open | Snow Patrol |
| 14 September | FutureSex/LoveSounds | Justin Timberlake |
| 21 September | Ta-Dah | Scissor Sisters |
| 28 September | Ta-Dah | Scissor Sisters |
| 5 October | Sam's Town | The Killers |
| 12 October | Sam's Town | The Killers |
| 19 October | Sam's Town | The Killers |
| 26 October | Sam's Town | The Killers |
| 2 November | Sam's Town | The Killers |
| 9 November | 9 | Damien Rice |
| 16 November | Gift Grub Volume 7 | Mario Rosenstock |
| 23 November | The Love Album | Westlife |
| 30 November | The Love Album | Westlife |
| 7 December | The Love Album | Westlife |
| 14 December | The Love Album | Westlife |
| 21 December | The Love Album | Westlife |
| 28 December | The Love Album | Westlife |

== See also ==
- 2006 in music
- List of number-one albums (Ireland)
