= 11 Past the Hour =

Studio album by Imelda May
- Released: 16 April 2021
- Length: 38:09
- Label: Decca
- Producer: Imelda May; Cam Blackwood; Tim Bran; Davide Rossi

Imelda May chronology
Life Love Flesh Blood (2017)	11 Past the Hour (2021)

Singles from 11 Past the Hour
- 1. "Just One Kiss" Released: 29 January 2021

11 Past the Hour is the sixth studio album by Irish singer-songwriter Imelda May. The album was released on 16 April 2021 by Decca Records. It is May's first album release in four years, following her previous album Life Love Flesh Blood (2017). "Just One Kiss", the first single from the album and a duet with Oasis member Noel Gallagher and featuring the Rolling Stones member Ronnie Wood, was released on 29 January 2021.

== Track listing ==
11 Past the Hour track listing
No.	Title	Writer(s)	Producer(s)	Length
1.	"11 Past the Hour"	May; Pedro Vito; Sebastian Sternberg	Cam Blackwood	3:59
2.	"Breathe"	May; Davide Rossi; Tim Bran	May; Rossi; Bran	3:24
3.	"Made to Love" (featuring Ronnie Wood, Gina Martin and Shola Mos-Shogbamimu)	May; Rossi; Bran	May; Rossi; Bran	3:25
4.	"Different Kinds of Love"	May; Jennifer Decilveo; Joe Rubel	Bran	3:01
5.	"Diamonds"	May; Sacha Skarbek	May; Rossi; Bran	2:59
6.	"Don't Let Me Stand on My Own" (featuring Niall McNamee)	May; McNamee	May; Bran	3:37
7.	"What We Did in the Dark" (featuring Miles Kane)	May; Rossi; Bran	May; Rossi; Bran	3:33
8.	"Can't Say"	May; Vito; Sternberg	May; Bran	3:47
9.	"Just One Kiss" (with Noel Gallagher, featuring Ronnie Wood)	May; Rossi; Bran	May; Bran	3:22
10.	"Solace"	May; Vito; Sternberg	Blackwood	3:35
11.	"Never Look Back"	May; Vito; Sternberg; Rossi; Bran	May; Bran; Rossi	3:27
Total length:				38:09

== Charts ==
Chart performance for 11 Past the Hour
Chart (2021)	Peak position
Belgian Albums (Ultratop Wallonia)	174
German Albums (Offizielle Top 100)	89
Irish Albums (OCC)	1
Scottish Albums (OCC)	3
Swiss Albums (Schweizer Hitparade)	37
UK Albums (OCC)	6
