= No Turning Back (Imelda May album) =

Studio album by Imelda May
- Released: 14 February 2003
- Genre: Rockabilly
- Length: 40:15
- Label: Foot Tapping

Imelda May chronology
No Turning Back (2003)	Love Tattoo (2008)

No Turning Back is the debut studio album by Irish rockabilly musician Imelda May. Originally, the album was released in 2003 under the name Imelda Clabby. However, it was later remixed and reissued in 2007.

== Track listing ==
No.	Title	Writer(s)	Length
1.	"Dealing with the Devil"	Sonny Boy Williamson I	2:18
2.	"Flame of Love"	Sonny Burgess	2:08
3.	"Cry for Me Baby"	Mel London	3:16
4.	"Till I Kissed You"	Don Everly	2:40
5.	"What Am I Gonna Do"	Imelda May	3:20
6.	"Once More"	Jerry Capehart	2:08
7.	"Wild About My Lovin'"	Traditional; arranged by Johnny Joyce	2:51
8.	"No Turning Back"	Lionel Bart	2:49
9.	"End of the World"	Arthur Kent, Sylvia Dee	2:51
10.	"Y'hoo"	May	2:29
11.	"Don't Do Me No Wrong"	Pat Cupp	2:36
12.	"Forever You and Me"	May	3:13
13.	"Bring My Cadillac Back"	Baker Knight	2:19
14.	"Lovey Dovey Lovely One"	London	2:21
15.	"Let Us Sing"	Traditional; arranged by May	2:56
Total length:			40:15
