= Julie Mundy =

British writer

- Occupation: Writer
- Writing career
- Genres: Biography, pop culture
- Website: www.julie.mundy.com

Julie Mundy is a British writer who focuses on 20th century history and pop culture, most notably Elvis Presley. She also runs Elvis Presley fansite Elvis fan club website, elvis.co.uk, "one of the main Elvis websites" in the UK, and acts as a judge at Elvis tribute act competitions. She also appeared on home improvement show 60 Minute Makeover getting an Elvis-themed remodelling.

== Published works ==
- The Official Elvis Presley Commemorative Album (1997)
- Don't Forget Me – The Eddie Cochran Story (2000) Library Journal found it a bit dull due to Cochran's quiet life and pleasant personality.
- Elvis Fashion: From Memphis To Vegas (2003) A "beautiful coffee-table volume" produced in collaboration with Elvis's estate. The tone is light, but Goldmine found a few errors, despite praising it as the first book to cover Elvis's clothes through his entire career.
- Travellers' Las Vegas (2004)
