= Johnny Got a Boom Boom =

Single by Imelda May

from the album Love Tattoo
- B-side: "Why Don't You Do Right?"
- Released: 26 January 2009
- Recorded: 2008 at Embassy Studios in Basingstoke, United Kingdom
- Genre: Rockabilly
- Length: 3:01
- Label: Ambassador (Universal Music Ireland)
- Songwriter(s): Imelda May
- Producer(s): Imelda May

Imelda May singles chronology
"Johnny Got a Boom Boom" (2009)	"Big Bad Handsome Man" (2009)

"Johnny Got a Boom Boom" is the debut single by Irish rockabilly musician Imelda May. Written solely by May, the song was released on 26 January 2009 on Ambassador Records, a sub-label of Universal Music Ireland, and is from her second studio album, Love Tattoo. The song gained significant popularity in Ireland and the United Kingdom upon its release and launched May into mainstream success after her performance of the song on Later... with Jools Holland on 23 September 2008. The song is also featured on the 2010 comedy-action movie Wild Target.

== Origin and recording ==
The song is known to have been written by May early in her professional career after the release of her debut studio album No Turning Back. During an interview with Gay Byrne on the RTÉ music programme For One Night Only' in 2011, May described the origin of the song, citing "boredom" as the reason for its writing.

"I was in another band and I was writing all my own stuff and I was itching to my own stuff. There was a soundcheck that was just going on and on and on... and my heart just wasn't in what I was doing anymore. My creativity was going overtime and during soundcheck, the double bass was doing it and I just started [writing it]. And there's a little nod to John Lee Hooker and "Boom Boom Boom" in there as well."

The song was recorded during the Love Tattoo sessions at Embassy Studios, a sixteen-track analogue recording studio in a converted cow shed, near Basingstoke, United Kingdom. A remixed version of the song, mixed by Andy Bradfield, appears as a bonus track on May's second studio album Mayhem, released in September 2010.

== Release and promotion ==
Though released as a single in January 2009, "Johnny Got a Boom Boom" saw its initial release through the promotional music video which was released in November 2008.

The song was performed during most of May's television appearances in promotion for Love Tattoo, including the 2009 Meteor Awards, Later... with Jools Holland, Loose Women, and The Late Late Show.

Though popular amongst May's fans and critics, the single failed to chart in either Ireland or the United Kingdom.

== Music video ==
Filmed on location in Dublin, the promotional music video for "Johnny Got a Boom Boom" is compiled of a dubbed live performance of the song in a small venue and clips of May and her band alongside the docks in the city. The video opens and closes with May doing her make-up in a mirror and her case resting on a copy of Ernest Hemingway's A Farewell to Arms. The music video uses an alternate mix of the song, which is also roughly twenty-one seconds shorter, to accompany the live performance clips.

== Musicians and personnel ==
The Imelda May Band

- Imelda May - vocals, bodhrán
- Darrel Higham - guitars
- Al Gare - bass, double bass
- Dean Beresford - drums, percussion
- Danny McCormack - piano, hammond
- Dave Priseman - trumpet, flugel, percussion

Technical personnel

- Imelda May - producer, engineer, mixing
- Guy Davie - mastering

== Track listing ==
All songs written by Imelda May.

Standard CD single and digital download

1. "Johnny Got a Boom Boom" (radio edit) - 2:38
2. "Why Don't You Do Right" - 3:15
