= Mayhem (Imelda May album) =

Third studio album by Imelda May

Studio album by Imelda May
- Released: 3 September 2010
- Recorded: May 2010–June 2010 at Embassy Studios in Basingstoke, U.K.
- Genre: Rockabilly
- Length: 51:23
- Label: Decca
- Producers: Imelda May, Andy Wright, Gavin Goldberg

Imelda May chronology
Love Tattoo (2008)	Mayhem (2010)	Tribal (2014)

Singles from Imelda May
- 1. "Psycho" Released: 27 June 2010; 2. "Mayhem" Released: 13 September 2010; 3. "Kentish Town Waltz" Released: 15 November 2010; 4. "Inside Out" Released: 16 January 2011; 5. "Sneaky Freek" Released: 25 February 2011

Professional ratings
Review scores
Source	Rating
AllMusic	3.5/5 stars
The Guardian	4/5 stars
The Telegraph	4/5 stars
BBC Music	Positive
RTÉ	4.5/5 stars

Mayhem is the third studio album by Irish rockabilly musician Imelda May, released on 3 September 2010 on Decca Records.

== Background ==
Three years prior to the release of Mayhem, in 2007, Imelda May received a recording contract with Ambassador Records, a sublabel of Universal Music Ireland, and recorded her second studio album, the highly acclaimed Love Tattoo. Reaching No.1 in Ireland, the album caught the attention of Jools Holland, whom she later supported on tour, which led him to request that she appear on his well-known music show Later... with Jools Holland.

Performing to an audience that included Jeff Beck, Elbow and Roots Manuva, May gained further recognition in the United Kingdom. The following year also saw May release her first two singles, "Johnny Got a Boom Boom" and "Big Bad Handsome Man", appear on several talk shows, win Female Artist of the Year 2009 at the 2009 Meteor Awards and also tour the United States.

== Recording and production ==
After touring throughout the world promoting Love Tattoo, May took a short break before entering the studio to record Mayhem. Choosing Embassy Studios in Basingstoke, a sixteen-track analogue recording studio in a converted cow shed, May's record label Decca were "freaking out" and "drove all the way to the middle of nowhere to have a look" after hearing the studio was a cowshed. The recording of the album took two weeks in total and production was completed in late summer 2010 at Electric Mastering.

Speaking of about the recording and production of the album, May said in an interview with RTÉ:

"This new album, I didn't feel any pressure on it. People have been saying to me, 'Oh it must've been hard doing another album' [but] it's what I do and it's what I love to do. The only stress I'd say that I had was convincing the record company to let me produce it, because that's unusual. I'd done quite a decent job on 'Love Tattoo' but it was very basic. I wanted it to be basic; I wanted to capture a live sound. On this one I wanted to do a bit more production on it but I didn't want to lose the charm of the last one. I wanted just to have a bit more fun with it and maybe get better mics in or better equipment in - you can hear the slap of the bass, that kind of stuff. I wanted it to be a step up but [to] not lose the plot either. So that was my only stress, trying to convince them [the label] because they were trying to set up meetings with big shot producers and I wasn't into it at all. When they heard what I was doing - because I secretly went in and started working on it! - they were happy with it and then they backed me."

== Release and promotion ==
Mayhem received more promotion than Love Tattoo, being better financed than its predecessor. Following performances on 30 January 2010 at the 52nd Grammy Awards with Jeff Beck and at major music festivals, such as the Eurosonic Festival in Groningen, Netherlands, promotion for Mayhem began with the release of the first of the album's three singles, "Psycho", on 27 June. Mayhem was released in Ireland on 3 September 2010 and in the United Kingdom on 4 October 2010 after delays. Between the two release dates, the title single "Mayhem", was released on 13 September. Sneaky Freak was also released as an iTunes free single of the week on 9 September.

On the album's release night, May appeared on The Late Late Show performing the title track and being interviewed by host Ryan Tubridy and the following day performed at Electric Picnic. The following week, the album entered the charts at No.1 and Love Tattoo remained at No. 4, also going triple platinum. Less than a month later, May began a short tour of the United Kingdom which included five shows and while in London, was featured on Weekend Wogan on BBC Radio 2. Her final performance of the tour was an appearance on Later... with Jools Holland where she first gained prominence in the United Kingdom. Recorded on 12 October and broadcast on 15 October, May performed "Mayhem", "Psycho" and "Tainted Love." The same week, May also appeared as a guest on satirical pop music quiz Never Mind the Buzzcocks. Despite the extensive promotion, the album initially failed to chart in the United Kingdom.

The album's third single, "Kentish Town Waltz", was released on 15 November and the following month, May returned to Ireland. She appeared on The Saturday Night Show on 11 December and performed "Kentish Town Waltz" and "Santa Claus Is Back in Town", Following her appearance, May performed a four-night sold-out stay at Dublin's Olympia Theatre from 15 to 18 December. The album's fourth, and possibly final, single "Inside Out" was released on 16 January 2011 and Mayhem entered the United Kingdom albums chart on the same day. Two weeks later, Mayhem peaked at No. 7 in the United Kingdom charts, and is May's best-selling album to date. An expanded version of the album entitled More Mayhem was released in September 2011, featuring six bonus tracks.

== Critical reception ==
Mayhem received critical acclaim similar to that of Love Tattoo. Kevin Le Gendre of BBC Music described May as "an imperious, take-no-prisoners personality who can certainly electrify a tune with the tigerish yelps and whoops that run deep into the marrow of the blues", The Telegraph praised "the lyrical wit of the songs and a subtle variance in musical shading", and Caroline Sullivan of The Guardian highlighted the songs on the album, stating that "she [May] brings them to passionate, reverb-drenched life on an album that positions her as one of 2010's more interesting finds."

== Track listing ==
All tracks are written by Imelda May unless otherwise noted.

No.	Title	Writer(s)	Length
1.	"Pulling the Rug"		3:54
2.	"Psycho"		2:53
3.	"Mayhem"		2:47
4.	"Kentish Town Waltz"		4:50
5.	"All for You"		2:51
6.	"Eternity"	Darrel Higham	3:17
7.	"Inside Out"		3:28
8.	"Proud and Humble"		4:01
9.	"Sneaky Freak"		3:05
10.	"Bury My Troubles"		3:07
11.	"Too Sad to Cry"		4:29
12.	"I'm Alive"		3:52
13.	"Let Me Out"		3:22
14.	"Tainted Love" (cover of Gloria Jones, 1965)	Ed Cobb	2:48

Enhanced CD bonus tracks
No.	Title	Length
15.	"Johnny Got a Boom Boom" (2010 remix, previously released on Love Tattoo)	2:41
16.	"Inside Out" (remix, included as a digital download)	3:42

iTunes bonus tracks
No.	Title	Length
15.	"Mayhem" (mastered version)	2:58
16.	"Psycho" (mastered version)	2:44

More Mayhem bonus tracks
No.	Title	Writer(s)	Length
16.	"Road Runner"		3:05
17.	"Gypsy"		3:28
18.	"Blues Calling"		4:53
19.	"Walkin' After Midnight" (cover of Patsy Cline, 1957)	Alan W. Block/Donald Hecht	2:51
20.	"Inside Out" (Imelda May vs. Blue Jay Gonzalez Latin mix)		3:15
21.	"Proud and Humble" (Steve Osbourne mix)		3:16
Total length:			72:02

== Personnel ==
All personnel credits adapted from the album's liner notes.

The Imelda May Band

- Imelda May – vocals, bodhrán
- Darrel Higham – guitar
- Al Gare – bass, double bass
- Steve Rushton – drums, percussion
- Dave Priseman – trumpet, flugel, percussion

Guest musicians

- John Quinn – fiddle (on "Kentish Town Waltz")
- Stewart Johnson – steel guitar (on "I'm Alive")
- Olly Wilby – clarinet (on "Inside Out")
- Andy Wood – trombone (on "Inside Out")
- Dean Beresford – drums (on "Johnny Got a Boom Boom" remix)

Technical personnel

- Imelda May – producer, mixing
- Andy Wright – producer, mixing
- Andy Bradfield - Producer, mixing
- Gavin Goldberg – producer, mixing
- Graham Dominy – engineer
- Darrel Highham – mixing
- Guy Davie – mastering

Art personnel

- Stylorouge – art direction, design
  - Front cover illustration by Mark Higenbottam
  - Photography by Chris Clor
  - Band photography by Lisa @ Cherry Bomb Rock Photography

== Chart positions ==
=== Weekly charts ===
Chart (2010–2011)	Peak position
Australian Albums (ARIA)	46
Belgian Albums (Ultratop Flanders)	72
Irish Albums (IRMA)	1
New Zealand Albums (RMNZ)	30
Scottish Albums (Official Charts)	7
Spanish Albums (Promusicae)	57
UK Albums (Official Charts)	7
US Billboard 200	108
US Top Blues Albums (Billboard)	2
US Heatseekers Albums (Billboard)	1
US Top Rock Albums (Billboard)	34
US Indie Store Album Sales (Billboard)	23

=== Year-end charts ===
Chart (2011)	Position
UK Albums (OCC)	71

=== All-time charts ===
Chart	Position
Irish Female Albums (IRMA)	28

=== Singles ===
Year	Single	Peak positions
Year	Single	IE
2010	"Mayhem"	24
2011	"Kentish Town Waltz"	28

== Certifications and sales ==
Region	Certification	Certified units/sales
Ireland (IRMA)	2× Platinum	30,000^{^}
United Kingdom (BPI)	Gold	100,000^{*}
United States	—	48,486
Summaries
Worldwide	—	400,000
^{*} Sales figures based on certification alone.^{^} Shipments figures based on certification alone.

== Release history ==
Region	Date	Format(s)	Label	Catalog
Ireland	3 September 2010	CD, limited edition CD, digital download	Decca	2749140
United Kingdom	4 October 2010	CD, limited edition CD, digital download	Decca	2751925
United States	19 July 2011	CD, digital download	Decca	B0015743-02
United States	6 December 2011	LP	Decca	B0016331-01
