= Love Tattoo =

Studio album by Imelda May
- Released: 20 October 2008
- Recorded: September 2007– March 2008 at Embassy Studios in Basingstoke, United Kingdom
- Genre: Rockabilly
- Length: 39:23
- Label: Universal
- Producer: Imelda May

Imelda May chronology
No Turning Back (2003)	Love Tattoo (2008)	Mayhem (2010)

Singles from Love Tattoo
- 1. "Johnny Got a Boom Boom" Released: 28 January 2009; 2. "Big Bad Handsome Man" Released: 13 April 2009

Love Tattoo is the second studio album by the Irish rockabilly musician Imelda May, released on 20 October 2008 on Universal Music.

Professional ratings
Review scores
Source	Rating
PopMatters	6/10
RTÉ	4/5 stars

== Track listing ==
All tracks are written by Imelda May unless otherwise noted.

No.	Title	Writer(s)	Length
1.	"Johnny Got a Boom Boom"		2:59
2.	"Feel Me"		2:57
3.	"Knock 123"		5:27
4.	"Wild About My Lovin'"	Traditional, arranged by Imelda May	3:15
5.	"Big Bad Handsome Man"		2:43
6.	"Love Tattoo"		2:55
7.	"Meet You at the Moon"		2:47
8.	"Smokers' Song"		2:37
9.	"Smotherin' Me"		2:42
10.	"Falling in Love with You Again"		4:07
11.	"It's Your Voodoo Working"	Charles Sheffield	3:12
12.	"Watcha Gonna Do"		3:42
Total length:			39:23

Limited edition bonus disc
No.	Title	Writer(s)	Length
1.	"My Babe" (live)		3:05
2.	"Don't Do Me No Wrong" (live)		3:07
3.	"Big Bad Handsome Man" (live)		3:03
4.	"Wild About My Lovin'" (live)	Traditional, arranged by Imelda May	3:11
5.	"Falling in Love with You Again" (live)		5:22
6.	"Watcha Gonna Do" (live)		3:43
7.	"Johnny Got a Boom Boom" (live)		3:05
8.	"Rollin' and Tumblin'" (live)	Traditional, arranged by Imelda May	5:40
Total length:			30:16

== Personnel ==
All personnel credits adapted from Love Tattoo's liner notes.

Performers

- Imelda May – vocals, bodhrán, producer
- Darrel Higham – guitar
- Al Gare – bass, double bass
- Danny McCormack – piano, organ
- Dave Priseman – trumpet, flugelhorn, percussion
- Dean Beresford – drums

Design personnel

- Jules Vegas – photography

== Charts ==
=== Weekly charts ===
Chart (2008)	Peak position
Scottish Albums (OCC)	82
UK Albums (OCC)	58
Chart (2009)	Peak position
Irish Albums (IRMA)	1
US Heatseekers Albums (Billboard)	12
Chart (2011)	Peak position
French Albums (SNEP)	14

=== Year-end charts ===
Chart (2011)	Position
UK Albums (OCC)	183

=== All-time charts ===
Chart	Position
Irish Female Albums (IRMA)	15

== Certifications ==
Region	Certification	Certified units/sales
France (SNEP)	Gold	50,000^{*}
United Kingdom (BPI)	Gold	100,000^{*}
^{*} Sales figures based on certification alone.
