= Darrel Higham =

English guitarist (born 1970)

- Born: 5 January 1970 (age 56); Bedford, England
- Genres: Rockabilly

Darrel Higham (born 5 January 1970) is an English rockabilly guitarist who performs with Kat Men. He was previously married to Imelda May and performed in her band.

== Biography ==
=== Music career ===
Higham started playing lead guitar with British rockabilly bands in the late 1980s. By the mid-1990s, he and the bass player Mick Wigfall had created the band that would become his main gigging and recording project: Darrel Higham & The Enforcers. Higham's solo projects include session work as guitarist with Chrissie Hynde, Jeff Beck, Rocky Burnette, Billy Lee Riley, Shakin' Stevens (on the 1999 UK tour). Eddie Cochran's last road band – The Kelly Four – employed Higham as their front man for a six-month period in 1992 for gigs and recordings in the US.

In 1996, he also appeared in London's Prince of Wales Theatre playing the role of Scotty Moore and Eddie Cochran for 8 months in a revival of Jack Good's Elvis: The Musical. This would lead to further roles as Eddie Cochran in touring theatre shows around the UK for a couple of years afterwards.

In 2006, Darrel found himself in California touring in support of WILD Records. After providing lead guitar on various WILD band recordings, he and Reb Kennedy (WILD Records founder) decided to record an album of Darrel's favourite rockabilly songs. The tracks were lost for some time, but recently resurfaced and the resulting 12-track album, "Wild in Hollywood" was finally released in March 2013.

In 2007, Higham formed Kat Men with former Stray Cats drummer Slim Jim Phantom. The duo recorded its debut album, Kat Men, with former Guns N' Roses guitarist Gilby Clarke.

From 2008 onwards he has also found success as lead guitarist in the Imelda May band, whose albums Love Tattoo and Mayhem reached number one in Ireland, as well as having toured the US as support acts to Jeff Beck and Jamie Cullum.

In 2011 he shared the lead vocal duties with May on the Jeff Beck DVD, A Rock 'n' Roll Party, and reunited Kat Men.

=== Embassy Studios ===
Higham co-owns Embassy Studios, a sixteen-track analogue recording studio near Basingstoke, with Foot Tapping Records boss, Clive Duffin. They also run a small recording label, Ambassador Records. Higham endorses Peavey and plays their amplifiers exclusively. He also helped design the company's first semi acoustic guitar – The Rockingham. He endorses Gretsch Guitars and performs using a variety of their guitars, including a Gretsch 6120, his own custom shop version of a 6120, a Gretsch White Falcon and a Gretsch Duo Jet.

=== Personal life ===
In 2002 Higham was married to singer Imelda May, they have one daughter together. In 2015, May announced their decision to separate after 13 years of marriage. After the separation, Higham also decided to leave May's band to focus on his solo career.

Higham is a fan of Sunderland AFC, a football team in the English Premier League.

== Published works ==
- Don't Forget Me – The Eddie Cochran Story (with Julie Mundy; Mainstream Publications, 2000)

== Discography ==
- Mobile Corrosion (Nervous, 1995)
- Hal Weston & the Offbeats (Pink & Black, 1996)
- Darrel Higham & the Barnshakers EP (Goofin' 1997)
- The Cochran Connection, Volume 1 (Rockstar, 1997)
- Howlin' at My Baby (Vampirella, 1998)
- High Class Baby (Goofin', 1998)
- Leather Heart EP (Vampirella, 2000)
- How to Dance the Bop (Spindrift, 2000)
- Ghost of Love (Hunka Burnin', 2001)
- The Sweet Georgia Brown Sessions (Foot Tapping, 2002)
- The Cochran Connection, Volume 2 (Rockstar, 2004)
- Believe What You Hear – A Tribute to Ricky Nelson (Foot Tapping, 2004)
- Midnight Commotion (Foot Tapping, 2004)
- Kat Men with Slim Jim Phantom (Kat Fight, 2006)
- Crazy with Love (Foot Tapping, 2006)
- Wild in Hollywood (WILD, 2013)

=== As Darrel Higham & The Enforcers ===
- Let's Rock Tonight (Fury, 1996)
- Rockin' at the Coconut Top (Crazy Love, 1996)
- For EP Fans Only (16/8 Records, 1997)
- Unleashed (Vampirella, 1999)
- Hip Shakin Baby: A Tribute to Johnny & Dorsey Burnette, with Rocky Burnette (2002?)
- Urban Jamboree (Foot Tapping, 2003)
- Live at the Thunderbird Club (Rockstar, 2004)
- A Monochrome Dream (Foot Tapping, 2008)

=== As Bob & The Bearcats ===
- Hold on Tight (Pollytone, 1994)
- On the Rampage (Pollytone, 1995)
- High Heels & Homicide (Pollytone, 1996)
- Rollin' to the Jukebox Rock (Vampirella, year unlisted)
