= Imelda May =

Irish singer and musician (born 1974)

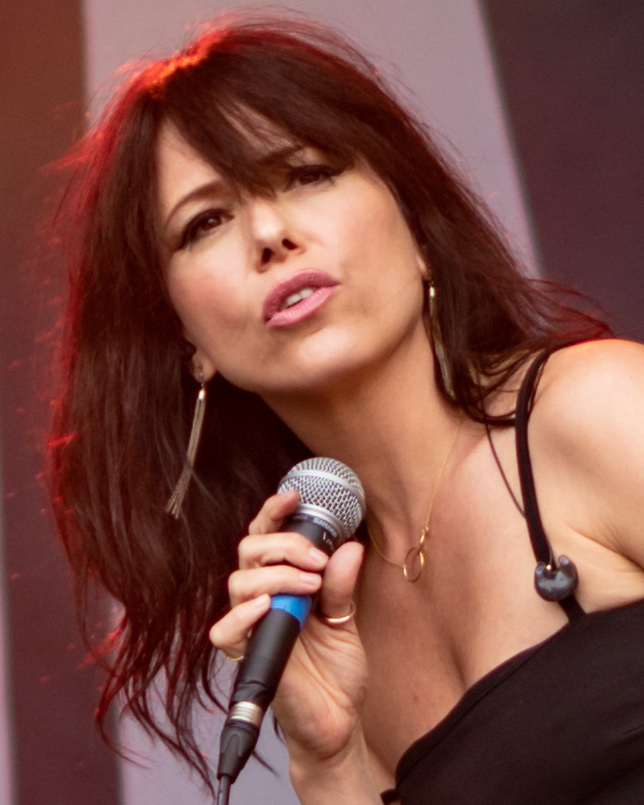
- May in 2018

Background information
- Born: Imelda Mary Clabby; 10 July 1974 (age 52); Dublin, Ireland
- Genres: Rockabilly; jazz; swing; folk; soul; traditional pop; soft rock
- Occupations: Singer; songwriter; television presenter
- Instruments: Vocals; guitar; bodhrán
- Years active: 2002–present
- Labels: Ambassador/Universal Ireland; Decca
- Website: imeldamay.co.uk

Imelda Mary Higham (née Clabby; born 10 July 1974), professionally known as Imelda May, is an Irish singer, songwriter, television presenter and multi-instrumentalist. She became known for her musical style of rockabilly revival and has also been compared to female jazz musicians such as Billie Holiday.

In 2002, she formed her own band and released her debut studio album, No Turning Back (2002). She released her second studio album, Love Tattoo, in 2009. Her third studio album, Mayhem (2010), earned her a nomination for the Choice Music Prize. She released her fourth studio album, Tribal in 2014, and her fifth, Life Love Flesh Blood in 2017 and her sixth 11 Past the Hour, was released on 16 April 2021.

== Early life and career ==
May was born in Dublin on 10 July 1974 in The Liberties in the south inner city. She is the youngest of five siblings, with sisters Edel Foy and Maria O'Reilly, and brothers Brendan and Fintan Clabby. In 1991, she attended Senior College Ballyfermot, where she studied art, graphics and printmaking.

== Professional career ==
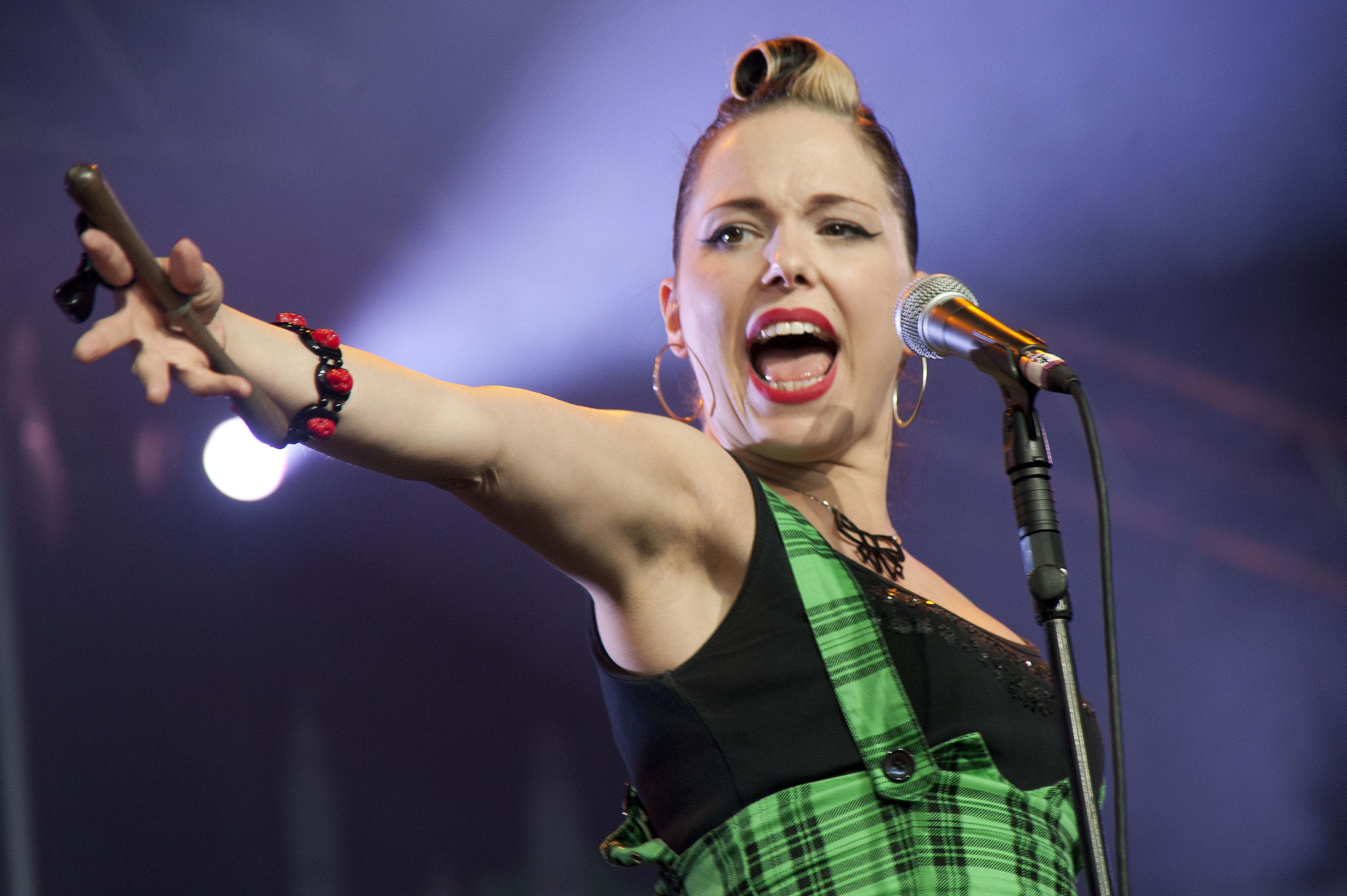
May at the Cambridge Folk Festival 2010

In 2003, May released No Turning Back. In 2007 she signed a recording contract with Ambassador Records, and recorded her second album, Love Tattoo, which reached No.1 in Ireland and received wide critical acclaim. She caught the attention of Jools Holland, whom she later supported on tour, which led him to request she appear on his music show Later... with Jools Holland. in 2008. She won Female Artist of the Year at the 2009 Meteor Awards.

Some people think the only way of doing well or of having a career in music is to go the X Factor route, but a lot of people lose the joy out of music by going that way, possibly because they're so incredibly focused on other people's ideas of success.

— Imelda May in 2009, selected as a quote of that year by The Irish Times.

On 31 January 2010, she performed at the 52nd Grammy Awards with Jeff Beck in tribute to Les Paul and Mary Ford. She released her third studio album, Mayhem, in Ireland on 3 September 2010, again reaching No. 1 in the Irish Album Charts, and in the United Kingdom on 4 October 2010, and earned her a nomination for the Choice Music Prize.

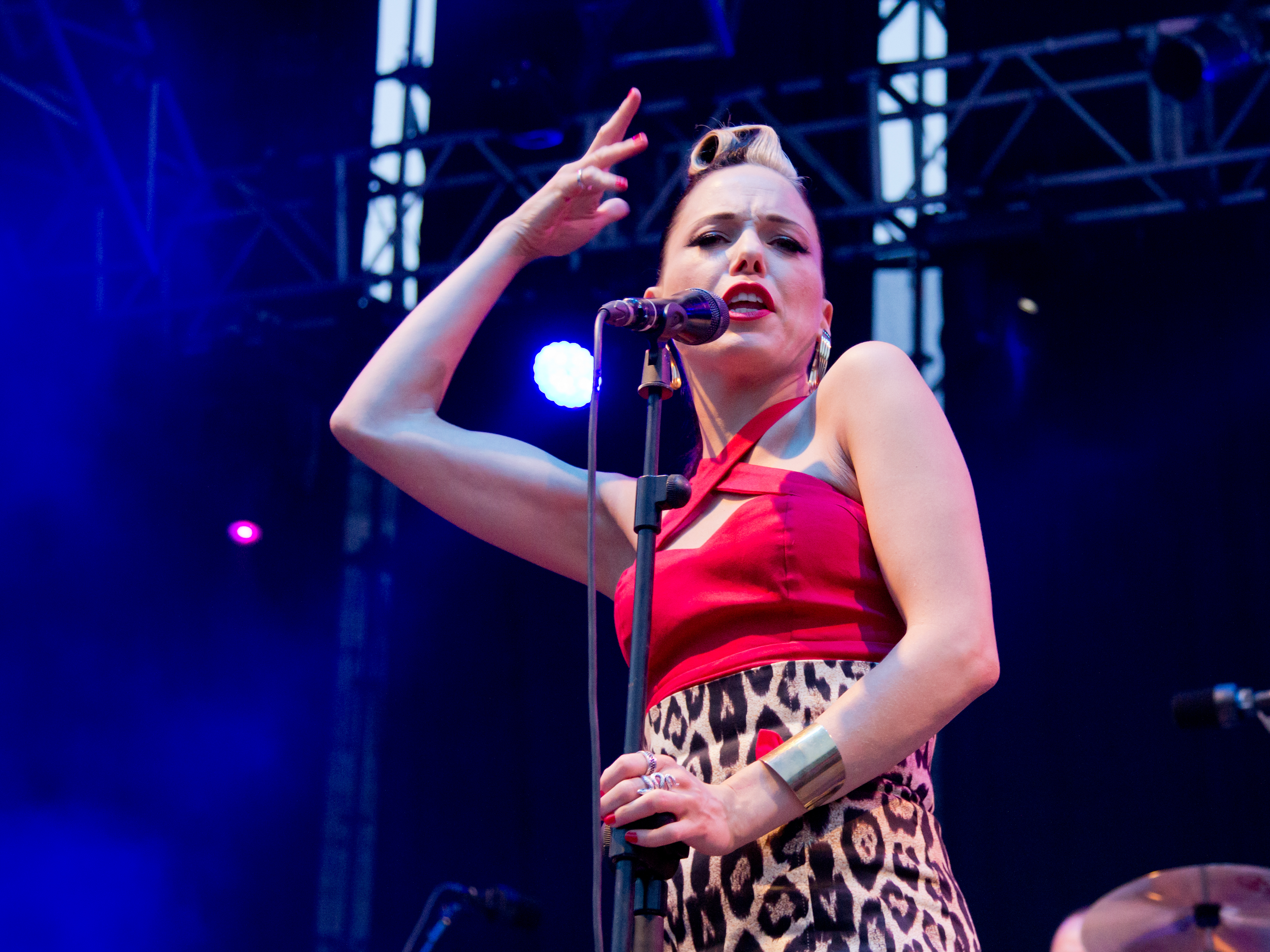
May at the Madgarden Festival 2015

May soon after appeared on The Tonight Show with Jay Leno, Conan and The Late Late Show with Craig Ferguson. In 2016, May performed at RTÉ's Centenary Concert to mark the 100th anniversary of the 1916 Rising. In the UK May appeared on Never Mind the Buzzcocks with the late Terry Wogan and Graham Norton Show and sang live on Strictly Come Dancing. May worked with BIMM music college in Dublin to provide a scholarship (which they named after her) for up-and-coming artists.

May's fifth album, Life Love Flesh Blood, was released on 7 April 2017. She collaborated with American musician T Bone Burnett on the record, who produced the album. Throughout the creative process, May received guidance from U2 vocalist Bono. Life Love Flesh Blood won critical acclaim and reached no. 4 in the UK charts. On 18 May 2017 May performed Life Love Flesh Blood at a special concert in the prestigious London Palladium.

In Ireland, she also had her own music TV show, The Imelda May Show, showcasing the best of Irish and international talent. May performed the Irish national anthem on 26 August 2017 at the T-Mobile Arena in Las Vegas, Nevada, prior to the Floyd Mayweather Jr. vs. Conor McGregor fight. In June 2020, she released the original composition You Don't Get To Be Racist And Irish which was used by the Irish government for the nationwide billboard campaign Rethink Ireland. May hosted a Sky Arts Original two-part series, 'Voices Of Ireland' which explores the rich history of literary talent, inspired by the natural beauty of Ireland's land.

In 2020 she also published a new album, Slip of the Tongue, whose style shifts from rock to spoken word.

Her second solo album apart from her former husband, 11 Past the Hour was released on 16 April 2021 on the Decca label. Also in 2021, May contributed a cover of the Metallica song "The God That Failed" to the charity tribute album The Metallica Blacklist.

=== Performances with other artists ===
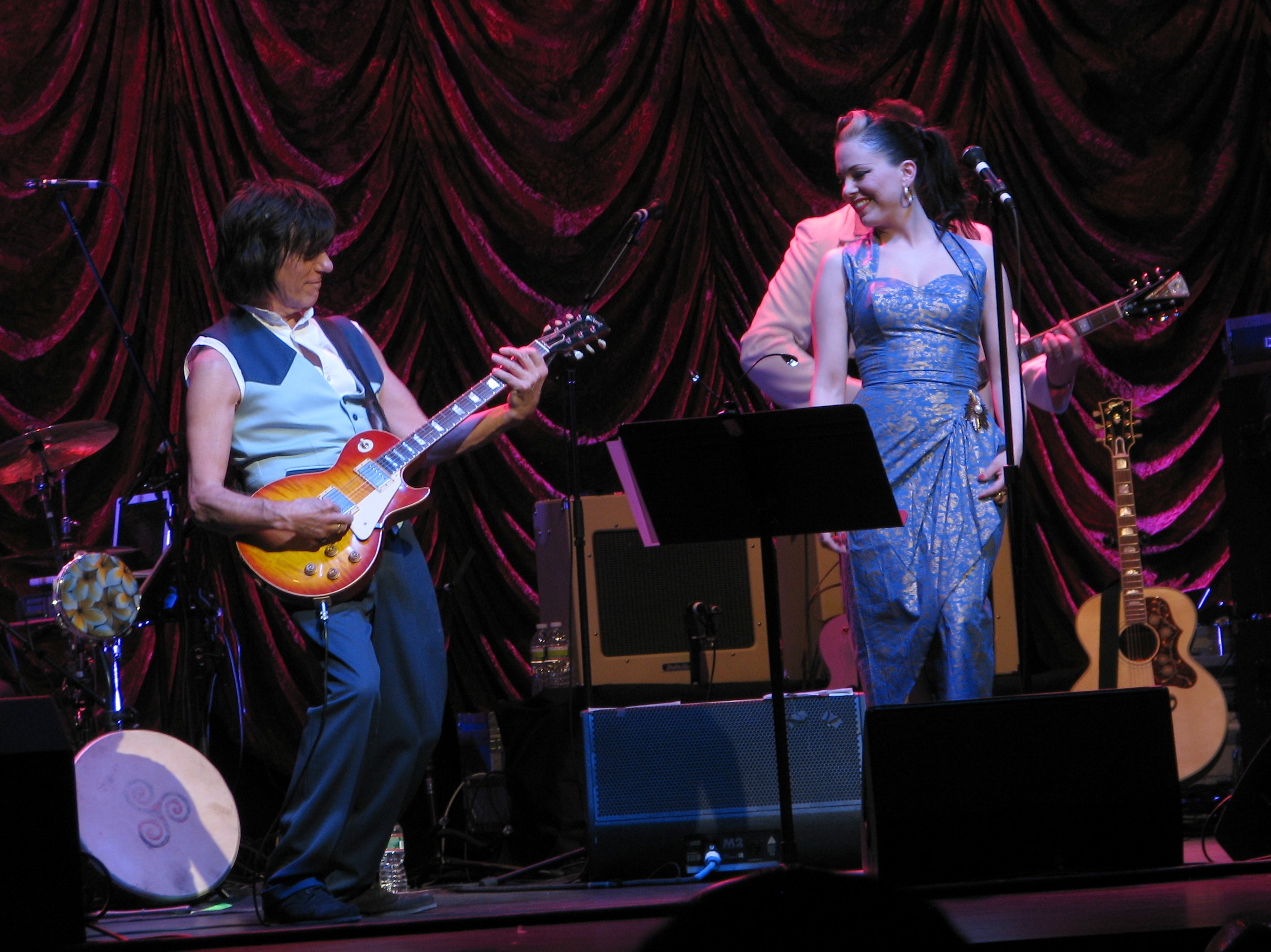
Imelda May and Jeff Beck at the Beacon Theatre, 28 March 2011

May has recorded and performed with a variety of artists. She has worked with producers Mike Crossey, Tony Visconti, Peter Asher and T Bone Burnett.

In 2010 she (and others) performed with Jeff Beck to honour the late guitarist Les Paul at Iridium Jazz Club in New York City, where the session was recorded for DVD and HBO and subsequently toured the US with Jeff Beck for five weeks. In December 2011 she sold out two nights at O2 Dublin, with Bono making a surprise appearance as her guest. May was the surprise guest in Dublin for U2's homecoming show on the band's 2015 Innocence + Experience tour: Bono called her "the other queen of Ireland" as she came on stage to perform "Desire", streamed live online to millions of viewers.

In 2017, she performed at Indigo O2, a tribute concert for Bill Wyman's 80th birthday, a live recorded concert during the London Blues Festival, alongside Robert Plant, Mark Knopfler, Bob Geldof, and Mick Hucknall.

In 2020, May was part of an Irish collective of female singers and musicians called Irish Women in Harmony that recorded a version of "Dreams" in aid of the charity SafeIreland, which deals with domestic abuse, which had reportedly risen significantly during the COVID-19 lockdown.

In 2021, she dueted with Noel Gallagher and Ronnie Wood of the Rolling Stones in the single "Just One Kiss" from the album 11 Past the Hour, and, together with The Waterboys and the Joanna Eden Band, she joined the line-up for Van Morrison's outdoor show at Audley End House and Gardens expected for 14 August 2021 in Saffron Walden.

In 2023, she was one of the performing artists at the "Tribute for Jeff Beck Concert" at the Royal Albert Hall. She joined the stage with Eric Clapton, Rod Stewart, Ronnie Wood, Johnny Depp, Doyle Bramhall, Gary Clark jr, Billy Gibbons, John McLaughlin, Joss Stone, Susan Tedeschi, Dereck Trucks, Olivia Safe, Robert Randolph and the Jeff Beck Band. She performed "Remember (Walking in the Sand)" and "Train Kept A-Rollin'".

=== Night for Ukraine benefit ===
May performed at Night for Ukraine, a fundraising benefit held at the Roundhouse in north London on the evening of March 9, 2022, with the funds raised being donated to the Disasters Emergency Committee appeal, to provide aid to people fleeing Ukraine following the Russian invasion. The event was organised by Fabien Riggall in collaboration with the Ukrainian pop duo Bloom Twins.

=== Acting ===
May made her acting debut in the 2022 film Fisherman's Friends: One and All.

== Personal life ==
May married her guitarist and band member, Darrel Higham, in 2002. She gave birth to a daughter in August 2012. On 17 July 2015, May announced the couple's decision to separate after 13 years of marriage.

May is an Irish language learner.

May has expressed solidarity with the Palestinian people "against [the Israeli] genocide and [...] occupation," as well as support for Jewish people in their quest for peace.

== Discography ==
- No Turning Back (2003)
- Love Tattoo (2008)
- Mayhem (2010)
- Tribal (2014)
- Life Love Flesh Blood (2017)
- Slip of the Tongue (2020)
- 11 Past the Hour (2021)

== Awards and nominations ==
| Year | Organisation | Nominated work | Award | Result |
|---|---|---|---|---|
| 2009 | 2009 Meteor Awards | Imelda May | Best Irish Female | Won |
| 2010 | RTÉ Radio 1 | Mayhem | Album of the Year | Won |
| 2011 | Choice Music Prize | Mayhem | Choice Music Prize | Nominated |
