= The Cost (album) =

Studio album by the Frames
- Released: 20 September 2006
- Recorded: March 2006
- Genre: Rock
- Labels: Plateau (Ireland); Anti- (International)

The Frames chronology
Burn the Maps (2004)	The Cost (2006)	Longitude (2015)

Professional ratings
Review scores
Source	Rating
AllMusic	4.5/5 stars
The A.V. Club	B+
The Boston Globe	8/10 stars
Filter	7.5/10 stars
Lost At Sea	4.5/5 stars
The New York Times	7/10 stars
Now	4/5 stars
Pitchfork	5.2/10
PopMatters	7/10 stars
Slant Magazine	4/5 stars

The Cost is the sixth studio album by the Frames, released in Ireland on Plateau Records on 20 September 2006. The album was released worldwide on Anti- on 20 February 2007. The album exhibits a sound more like that of For the Birds than their more recent album Burn the Maps. The Frames' line-up for The Cost features Glen Hansard on guitar and vocals, Colm Mac Con Iomaire on violin and keyboards, Joseph Doyle on bass guitar and backing vocals, Rob Bochnik on lead guitar and Graham Hopkins who played drums in place of the Frames' regular drummer Johnny Boyle. It was recorded in Black Box, France by Stephen Fitzmaurice and David Odlum with assistance from Fabian Lesure. The front and back covers feature photography by frontman Hansard of oak leaves, accompanied by a handwritten inscription reading: "Ni identitat permanent, ni idea de persona, ni d'ésser vivent, ni d'un temps d'existència" (which is Catalan for "Nor permanent identity, nor idea of a person, nor of being alive, nor of a time of existence", from a work of Antoni Tàpies). The album is enigmatically dedicated to "Multi (the ghost)".

Three songs on the album have been released before on separate productions. "Rise" appeared on The Roads Outgrown. Both "Falling Slowly" and "When Your Mind's Made Up" appeared on the 2006 album The Swell Season released by Glen Hansard and the Czech pianist Marketa Irglova. All three of these songs have been reworked for the album. Irglova shares writing credits with Hansard (and the band) on "Falling Slowly" and "People Get Ready".

A deluxe edition of the album was released on the US iTunes Store on 13 May 2008. It included three extra tracks - "The Blood," "No More I Love Yous," and "This Low," as well as the music videos for "Falling Slowly," "Sad Songs," and "The Side You Never Get To See."

The fourth track from the album, 'Rise', was featured on ABC's popular cop show 'Castle' on 24 January 2011.

== Track listing ==
All tracks composed by Glen Hansard; except where indicated

1. "Song for Someone" - 5:36
2. "Falling Slowly" (Hansard, M. Irglová) - 4:35
3. "People Get Ready" (C. MacConIomaire, Hansard) - 5:28
4. "Rise" - 3:26
5. "When Your Mind's Made Up" - 3:44
6. "Sad Songs" - 3:09
7. "The Cost" (C. Ward, Hansard) - 4:20
8. "True" - 5:14
9. "The Side You Never Get to See" - 3:40
10. "Bad Bone" - 4:42

== Chart positions ==
Chart (2006)	Peak position
Irish Albums (IRMA)	2
US Heatseekers Albums (Billboard)	46
