= Graham Hopkins =

Irish drummer (born 1975)

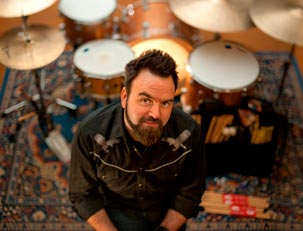

Background information
- Born: 20 December 1975 (age 50); Dublin, Ireland
- Origin: Clane, Ireland
- Genres: Rock, pop, jazz
- Occupation: Musician
- Instrument: Drums
- Years active: 1993–present

Graham Hopkins (born 20 December 1975) is an Irish drummer. He was the drummer in The Swell Season, The Frames and rock band Therapy?.

== Biography ==
=== Early years ===
Hopkins was born in Dublin and was brought up in Clane, County Kildare in a musical family (his father, Des being a jazz drummer). He was surrounded by music from an early age and began playing the drums at approximately four or five years old. In 1993, he left school to join My Little Funhouse, a band from County Kilkenny. The band had already released their debut album Standunder on Geffen Records, when Graham joined. The band toured for about a year in support of the album, mainly in the United States. Tours included support to Guns N' Roses and the Ramones amongst others. The band then lived in Los Angeles and recorded a second album for Geffen before imploding.

=== Notable appearances ===
==== Therapy? ====
Hopkins moved on, joining the popular Northern Irish band Therapy? in 1996, recording three studio albums – Semi-Detached, Suicide Pact – You First, Shameless – and also recorded new songs with the band for So Much for the Ten Year Plan: A Retrospective 1990-2000. His first public appearance with Therapy? was at the IRMA Awards, Dublin on 29 March 1996. Hopkins played his first full gig with Therapy? at a fan-club members only show at The Attic, Dublin on 10 April 1996. His last show was at the Ambassador Theatre, Dublin on 8 December 2001.

==== Gemma Hayes ====
After leaving Therapy? in December 2001 Hopkins was asked to tour with Irish singer/songwriter Gemma Hayes. He toured with Hayes for over a year – supporting her Mercury Music Prize-nominated album Night on My Side.

==== Halite ====
Hopkins then went on to record two albums with his own band Halite. Halite began as a solo project for Graham, who debuted with the critically acclaimed first album "Head On" with Warner Bros. Records in 2003. Head On was an off-kilter melodic pop/rock album. He played most instruments on the record but needed musicians to help out for playing live. He asked his friends Binzer Brennan, Keith Farrell and Derren Dempsey if they would tour with him. Halite then grew into a fully formed band. They soon went on to record and independently release their second album "Courses" in 2004. Halite played numerous shows over the following two years, including opening the Slane Concert in 2003 for Red Hot Chili Peppers and Foo Fighters. In early 2005, due to commitments with others projects from each member, the band was put on hold.

==== Boss Volenti ====
Hopkins was a member of Dublin band Boss Volenti for three years. He drummed on their self-titled debut album released in 2006 but left the band immediately after their appearance at Electric Picnic 2008.

==== The Cake Sale ====
Hopkins appeared as part of the band on the 2006 Oxfam charity album, The Cake Sale.

==== Snow Patrol ====
Hopkins spent the early part of 2007 stepping in as drummer for Snow Patrol on their European, Australian, New Zealand and American tours.

==== Dolores O'Riordan ====
He drummed on Dolores O'Riordan's debut solo album, Are You Listening? in 2007 before embarking on a worldwide tour with her.

==== Once and The Swell season ====
Hopkins also played on the soundtrack to the Irish Oscar-winning musical film Once which was written and directed by John Carney. He drummed on a few of the songs with Glen Hansard of The Frames and Markéta Irglová.

Hopkins toured with The Swell Season, which features Glen Hansard, Markéta Irglová and members of The Frames. The Swell Season released their second album, Strict Joy, in September 2009.

==== Others ====
Hopkins has played drums on numerous albums, both Irish and internationally, including with The Frames, The Swell Season, David Kitt, Mundy, The Reindeer Section, Josh Ritter, Jape, The Pale and Pugwash amongst many others.

Hopkins plays Zildjian cymbals, Aquarian drumheads, uses Vic Firth sticks and Drum Workshop drums, drum hardware and pedals.

== Short selected discography ==
- Therapy? – Semi-Detached (1998)
- Therapy? – Suicide Pact-You First (1999)
- Therapy? – So Much For the Ten Year Plan (2000)
- Therapy? – Shameless (2001)
- Therapy? – Music Through a Cheap Transistor (2007)
- The Frames – Dance the Devil (1999)
- The Frames – Burn the Maps (2004)
- The Frames – The Cost (2006)
- David Kitt – Square 1 (2003)
- David Kitt – Not Fade Away (2006)
- Pugwash – Jollity (2005)
- Pugwash – Giddy (2009)
- Dolores O'Riordan – Are You Listening? (2007)
- Jape – The Monkeys in the Zoo Have More Fun Than Me (2005)
- Paula Toledo - Stay Awhile (2006)
- Miriam Ingram – Trampoline (2006)
- Boss Volenti – Boss Volenti (2006)
- Ann Scott – We're Smiling (2006)
- The Cake Sale – The Cake Sale (2006)
- Once – Once soundtrack (2007)
- The Swell Season – Strict Joy (2009)
- Oliver Cole – We Albatri (2010)
- Q (Colm Quearney) – Root to the Fruit (2010)
