= Once (soundtrack) =

2007 soundtrack album by Glen Hansard, Markéta Irglová, and Interference

Soundtrack album by Glen Hansard, Markéta Irglová and Interference
- Released: 22 May 2007
- Recorded: 2006
- Genre: Folk rock
- Length: 43:37
- Labels: Canvasback; Columbia Records; Sony BMG
- Producer: Glen Hansard

Singles from Once
- 1. "Falling Slowly" Released: 21 April 2006 (The Swell Season) 22 September 2006 (The Cost) 22 May 2007 (the film's soundtrack) February 2008 (radio single)

Once (Music from the Motion Picture) is the soundtrack to the 2007 film of the same name directed by John Carney. It was released by Columbia Records and Canvasback Music on 22 May 2007 in the United States and on 26 May in Ireland. The album featured 13 tracks into the album; all of them were performed by Glen Hansard and Markéta Irglová, with one song being performed by the band Interference. A collector's edition of the album, with two additional tracks — cover versions of "And the Healing Has Begun" and "Into the Mystic" — were released by Sony BMG on 4 December 2007.

The song "Falling Slowly" won the Academy Award for Best Original Song, and Critics' Choice Movie Award for Best Song. The album received two nominations at the 50th Annual Grammy Awards, for Best Compilation Soundtrack Album for Motion Picture, Television or Other Visual Media and Best Song Written for Motion Picture, Television or Other Visual Media. Initially, the song's eligibility had been disputed because it was performed and recorded prior to the release of Once in 2006 and has been featured in the duo's The Swell Season and The Frames' album The Cost, and has been used as the title song of Beauty in Trouble. The Academy of Motion Picture Arts and Sciences ruled, however, that since the song had been written and composed during the film's production and due to the minimal public exposure on the film's production, it remained eligible. (Note: The Academy had ruled consistently on a similar dispute involving 2005 Best Original Song nominee "In the Deep.")

The album was commercially successful, post the Oscar-win with sales of over 400,000 units during 2007 and 2008. It was ranked at number two on the Entertainment Weekly 25 New Classic Soundtrack Albums list (1983–2008).

== Reception ==
Writing for The Cornell Daily Sun, Rebecca Weiss commented: "This album isn't perfect, but the sheer newness of the sound makes up for the few individual flaws within them". Ernest Simpson of Treblezine wrote "It's one thing for two musicians to find each other and create unbelievably great music because of the intense chemistry. It's another thing altogether when two people are 'put together' and get the same result. Once is already being hailed as one of the best 'music films' ever made, but that sells it short. It's also one of the best love stories ever written for the screen, made better by the emotional resonance of the songwriting. If this film doesn't satisfy you with its message or its music, take heart from the real life tale of the two leads."

Dan MacIntosh of AntiMusic wrote "Making love work, as well as making it in the music business, are two of the hardest roads any human can walk. The music of Once will likely make your feet blister with empathy for these onscreen strugglers." Embo Blake of Hybrid Magazine wrote "If the songs on Once are any indication, then any rumors of Hansard's momentary madness are baseless and the man continues to climb his life's ladder, embracing his brilliant artistic vision. These songs show a struggle... not a struggle that weakens the soul but strengthens a man through the trials and tribulations of life. Hansard's songwriting once more takes the listener through all the stages of life in a short while, revealing glimpses of love and loss and pain and pleasure and all that life has to offer. These are gifts, and Glen Hansard is one of the finest voices in modern music that reveal the world around us as a construct of love and learning."

== Commercial performance ==
The album had a slow start on both digital and physical sales, selling over 192,000 copies as of 4 January 2008. At the Billboard 200 charts on the week of 16 June 2007, the album debuted at number 107, and later jumped to 104, and 100, on the consecutive weeks. It peaked to number 71 on the week of 7 July. The album debuted at number 10 on the Top Soundtracks chart on the week of 9 June 2007, and peaked to the fourth position for the two consecutive weeks, before charting at the second position as on the week of 7 July 2007. It also debuted at number 20 on the Irish Albums Chart in its first week, peaking to number 15 a few weeks later.

After the song "Falling Slowly" won the Academy Award for Best Original Song at the 80th Academy Awards on 24 February 2008, the album further peaked at number 31 on the week of 8 March 2008, and topped to the seventh position, the following week, the highest charting for the album. It has sold over 47,000 units on that week. The album topped the Irish Albums Chart, while "Falling Slowly" reached a new peak of number 2.

== Accolades ==
Award	Category	Recipient(s) and nominee(s)	Result	Ref.
Academy Awards	Best Original Song	Glen Hansard and Markéta Irglová for "Falling Slowly"	Won	
Chicago Film Critics Association	Best Original Score	Glen Hansard and Markéta Irglová	Won	
Critics' Choice Awards	Best Song	Glen Hansard and Markéta Irglová for "Falling Slowly"	Won	
Empire Awards	Best Soundtrack	Once	Nominated	
Evening Standard British Film Awards	Best Film Score	Glen Hansard and Markéta Irglová	Nominated	
Florida Film Critics Circle	Best Original Songs	Glen Hansard and Markéta Irglová	Won	
Grammy Awards	Best Compilation Soundtrack Album for Motion Picture, Television or Other Visual Media	Glen Hansard and Markéta Irglová	Nominated	
Grammy Awards	Best Song Written for Motion Picture, Television or Other Visual Media	Glen Hansard and Markéta Irglová for "Falling Slowly"	Nominated	
Houston Film Critics Society	Best Original Score	Glen Hansard and Markéta Irglová	Nominated	
Houston Film Critics Society	Best Original Song	Glen Hansard and Marketa Irglova for "Falling Slowly"	Won	
Houston Film Critics Society	Best Original Song	Glen Hansard and Markéta Irglová for "If You Want Me"	Nominated	
Irish Film and Television Awards	Best Music in Film	Once	Nominated	
Los Angeles Film Critics Association	Best Music	Glen Hansard and Markéta Irglová	Won	
Online Film Critics Society	Best Original Score	Glen Hansard and Markéta Irglová	Nominated	
Satellite Awards	Best Original Song	Glen Hansard and Markéta Irglová for "If You Want Me"	Nominated	
St. Louis Gateway Film Critics Association	Best Score	Glen Hansard and Markéta Irglová	Nominated	

== Track listing ==
Once (Music from the Motion Picture)
No.	Title	Writer(s)	Performer(s)	Length
1.	"Falling Slowly"	Glen Hansard and Markéta Irglová	Glen Hansard and Markéta Irglová	4:04
2.	"If You Want Me"	Irglová	Irglová and Hansard	3:48
3.	"Broken Hearted Hoover Fixer Sucker Guy"	Hansard	Hansard	0:53
4.	"When Your Mind's Made Up"	Hansard	Hansard and Irglová	3:41
5.	"Lies"	Hansard and Irglová	Hansard and Irglová	3:59
6.	"Gold"	Fergus O'Farrell	Interference	3:59
7.	"The Hill"	Irglová	Irglová	4:35
8.	"Fallen from the Sky"	Hansard	Hansard	3:25
9.	"Leave"	Hansard	Hansard	2:46
10.	"Trying to Pull Myself Away"	Hansard	Hansard	3:36
11.	"All the Way Down"	Hansard	Hansard	2:39
12.	"Once"	Hansard	Hansard and Irglová	3:39
13.	"Say It to Me Now"	Hansard	Hansard	2:35

Collector's edition
No.	Title	Writer(s)	Performer(s)	Length
14.	"And the Healing Has Begun"	Van Morrison	Hansard	5:19
15.	"Into the Mystic"	Morrison	Hansard and Irglová	4:21

== Charts and certifications ==
=== Weekly charts ===
Chart (2008)	Peak position
Austrian Albums (Ö3 Austria)	48
Canadian Albums (Billboard)	8
Finnish Albums (Suomen virallinen lista)	22
French Albums (SNEP)	81
German Albums (Offizielle Top 100)	40
Irish Albums (IRMA)	1
New Zealand Albums (RMNZ)	14
Norwegian Albums (VG-lista)	33
Spanish Albums (Promusicae)	98
Swiss Albums (Schweizer Hitparade)	42
UK Compilation Albums (OCC)	40
UK Soundtrack Albums (OCC)	8
US Billboard 200	7
US Independent Albums (Billboard)	1
US Current Album Sales (Billboard)	7
US Soundtrack Albums (Billboard)	2

=== Year-end charts ===
Chart (2008)	Position
Irish Albums (IRMA)	19
US Billboard 200	7
US Independent Albums (Billboard)	99
US Soundtrack Albums (Billboard)	10

=== Certifications ===
Region	Certification	Certified units/sales
Australia (ARIA)	Gold	35,000^{^}
Germany (BVMI)	Gold	100,000^{‡}
Ireland (IRMA)	2× Platinum	30,000^{^}
United Kingdom (BPI)	Gold	100,000^{‡}
United States (RIAA)	Gold	500,000^{^}
^{^} Shipments figures based on certification alone.^{‡} Sales+streaming figures based on certification alone.

== Personnel ==
Credits adapted from CD liner notes.

- Cello – Bertrand Galen (tracks: 1, 5, 7)
- Guitar – Rob Bochnik (tracks: 2, 6, 10), Glen Hansard (tracks: 1, 3, 4, 5, 6, 8, 9, 10, 11, 12, 13), Marketa Irglova (tracks: 2)
- Keyboards, bass, vocals – Glen Hansard (tracks: 2, 8, 12)
- Mastered by – Greg Calbi
- Mixed by – Rob Bochnik (tracks: 1, 2, 3, 5, 6, 7, 9, 10, 11, 12, 13)
- Additional mixing – Stephen Fitzmaurice (tracks: 4)
- Piano – Marketa Irglova (tracks: 1, 4, 5, 7, 12)
- Soundtrack producer – Glen Hansard
- Recorded by – Andrej Lažo (tracks: 1, 4, 5, 7), Rob Bochnik (tracks: 3, 6, 9, 10, 11, 12, 13)
- Additional recording – Stephen Fitzmaurice (tracks: 4)
- Violin, viola – Marja Tuhkanen (tracks: 1, 5, 7)
- Music, lyrics – Glen Hansard (tracks: 1, 3, 4, 5, 8, 9, 10, 11, 12, 13), Marketa Irglova (tracks: 1, 2, 5, 7)
