= Set List (The Frames album) =

Live album by the Frames
- Released: May 16, 2003
- Recorded: Live at Vicar St., November 2002
- Genre: Rock
- Length: 73:01
- Label: Plateau

The Frames chronology
Breadcrumb Trail (2002)	Set List (2003)	Burn the Maps (2004)

Professional ratings
Review scores
Source	Rating
Pitchfork	7/10 stars
Planet Sound	4/10 stars
PopMatters	(favorable)

Set List is the second live album by Dublin-based rock band the Frames. It was recorded live in Dublin's Vicar Street venue in November 2002. The inside cover reads "for mic" in reference to Mic Christopher, musician and friend of the band.

This was the first album by the band to reach #1 in the Irish Album Charts.

"This glorious live recording shows exactly why the Frames are the darlings of Ireland's music scene. Set List (is) a sublime distillation of the very best of their work to date. There are moments of transcendental magic on this album"

— Bruce Elder, The Sydney Morning Herald

This album showcases the Frames' ability to capture an audience's interest as the crowd sings along to songs and reacts to frontman Glen Hansard's anecdotes. Set List also features a number of covers interspersed into the middle of the Frames' own tunes such as the version of Johnny Cash's "Ring of Fire" during "Lay Me Down" and Bob Marley's "Redemption Song" at the end of "Your Face" and also a tease of "Pure Imagination" from Willy Wonka & the Chocolate Factory in "Star Star".

== Track listing ==
1. "Revelate"
2. "Star Star"
3. "Lay Me Down"
4. "God Bless Mom"
5. "What Happens When the Heart Just Stops"
6. "Rent Day Blues"
7. "Pavement Tune"
8. "Stars Are Underground"
9. "Santa Maria"
10. "Perfect Opening Line"
11. "Your Face"
12. "Fitzcarraldo"
13. "The Blood"

== Chart positions ==
Country	Position
Ireland	1

== Personnel ==
- Glen Hansard – guitar, vocals
- Colm Mac Con Iomaire – violin, keyboards, vocals
- Joseph Doyle – bass guitar, vocals
- Rob Bochnik – lead guitar
- Dave Hingerty – drums
