= The Roads Outgrown =

EP released by the band The Frames

EP by The Frames
- Released: August 19, 2003
- Genre: Folk rock

The Roads Outgrown is an EP released by the band The Frames. It is a collection of B-sides, covers, live songs, and reworked versions of earlier songs. The EP was released solely in the United States on August 19, 2003.

"Lay Me Down" and "Headlong" are different versions of songs originally recorded on the band's 2001 album For the Birds. "God Bless Mom" is a different version of the song that originally appeared on the 1999 album Dance the Devil.

The songs "New Partner" and "Listen Girl" were covers of Will Oldham and Mic Christopher songs respectively.

The live version of "Fitzcarraldo" was taken from the 2002 live album Breadcrumb Trail.

== Track listing ==
1. "Lay Me Down"
2. "Headlong"
3. "Rise"
4. "God Bless Mom"
5. "New Partner" (Will Oldham)
6. "Tomorrow's Too Long"
7. "Listen Girl" (Mic Christopher)
8. "Sickbeds"
9. "Fitzcarraldo (live)"
