= Dave Hingerty =

Irish drummer and photographer

- Born: 1969 (age 56–57)
- Occupation: Drummer
- Member of: Kíla
- Formerly of: The Frames, Josh Ritter's band

Dave Hingerty (born 1969) is an Irish drummer and photographer. He was the drummer of The Frames from 1998 to 2003 and again from 2019 to 2020. He is also the drummer with Kíla since 2010, and has played with and recorded with a number of other acts including Josh Ritter, who he performed with on several albums.

== Early life ==
Hingerty was born in Dublin. His mother Kay was a journalist with the Irish Examiner whilst his father, Daniel Joseph Hingerty, was Professor of Biochemistry at University College Dublin and was a former Irish Rugby International. He studied psychology at University College Dublin after his secondary schooling C.B.C. Monkstown. At UCD he met Colm Mac Con Iomaire, who he would later play in The Frames with.

== Career ==
Hingerty joined with The Frames after their previous drummer left the band, meeting the band on Tour in France. He played on Dance with the Devil, Set List and For the Birds with the band. He left the band due to creative differences with Glen Hansard but remains friends with him and has played in Hansard's other band, The Swell Season.

Following The Frames, he played with Josh Ritter. playing on Hello Starling and The Animal Years. He joined Kíla in 2010 and played again for The Frames from 2019 to 2020.

He is also a photographer, with his photo exhibition on his life on tour exhibited by Duke Street Gallery in Dublin.

== Discography ==
- Hello Starling - Josh Ritter
- The Animal Years - Josh Ritter
- Live From Vicar Street - Josh Ritter
- Set List - The Frames (Meteor Award)
- Dance The Devil - The Frames
- For the Birds - The Frames
