= Breadcrumb Trail =

Live album by The Frames
- Released: June 2002
- Recorded: 26 January 2002
- Venue: Stará Pekárna, Brno
- Genre: Rock
- Label: Indies (Czech Republic); Plateau (Ireland)

The Frames chronology
For the Birds (2001)	Breadcrumb Trail (2002)	Set List (2003)

Professional ratings
Review scores
Source	Rating
AllMusic	4/5 stars

Breadcrumb Trail is the first live album by Dublin based band The Frames, recorded in Stará Pekárna, Brno in the Czech Republic. The album was released in June 2002 on Indies Records in the Czech Republic and the Frames' own indie label Plateau Records in Ireland. The band's line-up for this album featured Glen Hansard on guitar and vocals, Colm Mac Con Iomaire on violin, Joseph Doyle on bass guitar and backing vocals, Simon Good on lead guitar and Dave Hingerty on drums.

The album also featured a guest violinist Jan Hrubý (Tracks 4 and 6) and vocal performances from Markéta and Zuzana Irglová (on "Star Star").

== Track listing ==
1. "Lay Me Down" (5:06)
2. "What Happens When the Heart Just Stops" (5:12)
3. "Rent Day Blues" (7:27)
4. "Fitzcarraldo" (9:40)
5. "Giving Me Wings" (3:24)
6. "Ohio Riverboat Song" (6:06)
7. "Santa Maria" (8:56)
8. "Mighty Sword" (5:43)
9. "Red Chord" (9:35)
10. "New Partner" (5:34)

Bonus tracks

11. "Look Back Now" (4:15)
12. "Star Star" (4:09)
