= The Stars Are Underground =

1996 documentary film by Daragh McCarthy

VHS cover

The Stars Are Underground is a 1996 Irish 24-minute film documenting the underground music scene in Dublin, Ireland. The film was first shown in the same year, 1996, and a VHS was released by Folkrum Records. Directed by Daragh McCarthy, the film documents a generation of Irish bands who took their inspiration from American hardcore punk bands who, rather than pursuing major label deals, made their own self-financed records and released their own material.

The bands featured and interviewed include Female Hercules, The Mexican Pets, and The Jubilee Allstars. The Stars are Underground also features interviews with Andy Cairns from Therapy? and Dischord Records' Ian MacKaye from the group Fugazi.

The film inspired Academy Award winning singer/songwriter Glen Hansard of The Frames to write a song of the same name after he played on a tour of the film's screenings in rock venues in rural Ireland. The Frames "The Stars Are Underground" appeared on their Dance the Devil album in 1999.

== See also ==
- Dischord Records
- Fugazi
