= Strict Joy =

2009 studio album by the Swell Season

Studio album by the Swell Season
- Released: October 23, 2009
- Recorded: Late 2008–2009
- Studios: Tarquin, Bridgeport, Connecticut
- Genre: Indie folk
- Labels: Plateau (Ireland), Anti- (Europe & North America)
- Producers: Glen Hansard, Peter Katis

The Swell Season chronology
The Swell Season (2006)	Strict Joy (2009)

Professional ratings
Review scores
Source	Rating
AllMusic	4/5 stars
American Music Channel	4.5/5 stars
Blare Magazine	3.5/5 stars
Entertainment Weekly	B
Pitchfork	6.5/10
Spin	4/5 stars

Strict Joy is the second album by the Swell Season (Glen Hansard and Markéta Irglová). It was released in Ireland on October 23, 2009, the rest of Europe on October 26, and on October 27 in North America on the Anti- record label. The title of the album was derived from a 1931 book of poems written by Irish poet James Stephens.

The album reached number 15 on the Billboard 200.

== Promotion ==
"In These Arms", the first single from the album was released on iTunes on August 18, 2009, and began streaming on spinner.com during the same week.

The Swell Season performed six of the new songs on NPR's Tiny Desk Concert on the August 10th show.

== Track listing ==
1. "Low Rising" (Glen Hansard) – 3:59
2. "Feeling the Pull" (Glen Hansard) – 2:20
3. "In These Arms" (Glen Hansard) – 3:33
4. "The Rain" (Glen Hansard) – 3:40
5. "Fantasy Man" (Glen Hansard, Markéta Irglová) – 5:04
6. "Paper Cup" (Glen Hansard) – 3:21
7. "High Horses" (Glen Hansard) – 5:00
8. "The Verb" (Glen Hansard) – 4:32
9. "I Have Loved You Wrong" (Markéta Irglová) – 5:04
10. "Love That Conquers" (Glen Hansard) – 3:56
11. "Two Tongues" (Glen Hansard) – 3:44
12. "Back Broke" (Glen Hansard) – 4:03
13. "Somebody Good" (Japan and Korea bonus track)
14. "When Your Mind's Made Up" (Live) (Brazil bonus track)
15. "Falling Slowly" (Live) (Brazil bonus track)
16. "Lies" (Live) (Brazil bonus track)

Special edition live disc

1. "All the Way Down"
2. "Lies"
3. "This Low"
4. "Drown Out"
5. "When Your Mind's Made Up"
6. "I Have Loved You Wrong"
7. "Falling Slowly"
8. "Leave"
9. "What Happens When the Heart Just Stops"
10. "Lay Me Down"
11. "Once"
12. "If You Want Me"
13. "Broken Hearted Hoover Fixer Sucker Guy"
14. "Fitzcarraldo"

Special edition DVD (One Step Away - Live from the Riverside Theater, Milwaukee, WI. May 8, 2008)

1. "Say It to Me Now"
2. "All the Way Down"
3. "When Your Mind's Made Up"
4. "Lay Me Down"
5. "Falling Slowly"
6. "Gigantic" (Pixies cover)
7. "Loved You Wrong"
8. "Fitzcarraldo"
9. "Once"

== Personnel ==
=== Musicians ===
- Glen Hansard – vocal, guitar
- Markéta Irglová – piano, vocal
- Colm Mac Con Iomaire – violin
- Rob Bochnik – guitar, mandolin
- Joe Doyle – bass guitar
- Graham Hopkins – drums
- Thomas Bartlett – piano, keyboards
- Steven Bernstein – horns
- Clark Gayton – horns
- Chris Lightcap – bass
- Chad Taylor – drums
- Javier Mas – guitar

== Charts ==
Chart performance for Strict Joy
Chart (2009)	Peak position
Australian Albums (ARIA)	88
Canadian Albums (Nielsen SoundScan)	30
Irish Albums (IRMA)	19
UK Independent Albums (Official Charts)	29
US Billboard 200	15
US Folk Albums (Billboard)	3
US Independent Albums (Billboard)	1
US Top Alternative Albums (Billboard)	4
US Top Rock Albums (Billboard)	5
US Top Tastemaker Albums (Billboard)	5
