= Dave Odlum =

David Odlum
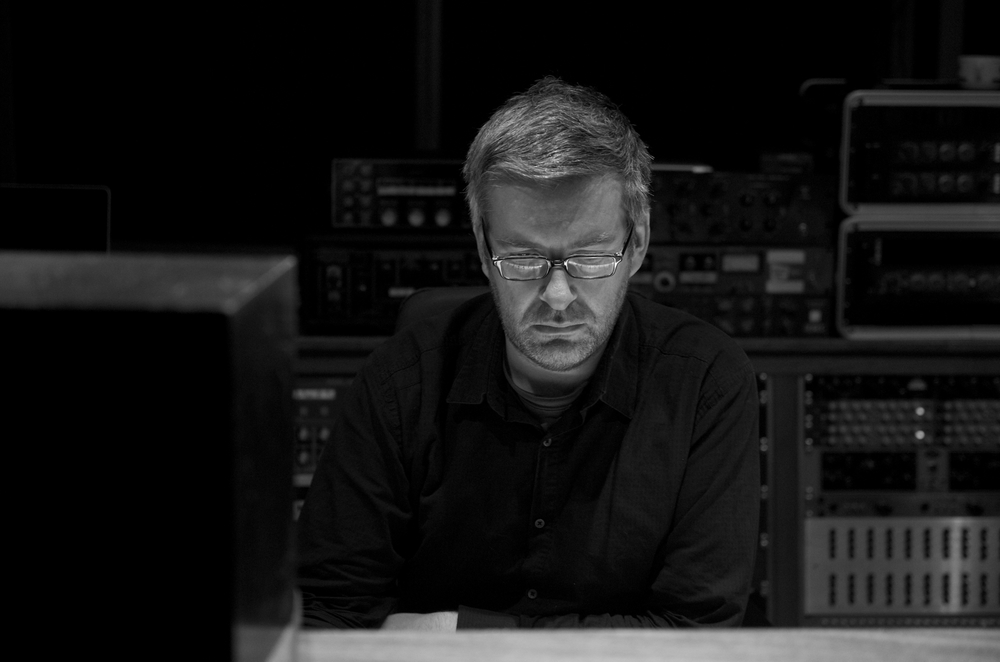
- Odlum at Studio Black Box, France in 2012
- Born: David Odlum; Ireland
- Occupations: Producer, engineer, guitarist, drummer, programmer
- Known for: being a member of Kíla and The Frames, his long-term association with Gemma Hayes
- Musical career
- Website: davidodlum.com (defunct)

David Odlum is an Irish music producer, engineer, guitarist, and drummer who has worked and played with Academy Award winners and Mercury Prize nominees. Originally a member of Kíla, a band which was founded during his schooldays at Coláiste Eoin, he left them and joined rock group The Frames, fronted by the Academy Award-winner Glen Hansard, and with whom he played guitar from 1990 until 2002. Since leaving the band, he has pursued a career as a music producer. Odlum has established a long running association with singer-songwriter Gemma Hayes, producing her Mercury Prize-nominated debut album Night on My Side, as well as later albums The Hollow of Morning, Let It Break and an as-yet untitled fifth album due in 2014. Odlum also played briefly with her (along with his brother, Karl Odlum).

Other musicians for whom Odlum has produced albums include The Frames, with whom he worked on the album Burn the Maps after he had left the band, dEUS, Nina Hynes, Josh Ritter, Eoin Coughlan, Ham Sandwich (Carry the Meek), Luka Bloom (Eleven Songs) and Miriam Ingram (Trampoline). In late January 2012 Odlum travelled to Australia to record Australian indie band Blackchords.

== Career ==
Odlum began his musical career as one of a series of about twenty buskers on the streets of Dublin. He joined Kíla, a band made up of a group of these buskers, where he played in the city's live venues. Colm Mac Con Iomaire featured alongside Odlum in Kíla and the two later formed The Frames alongside fellow busker Glen Hansard. The buskers' sense of camaraderie led to them raising enough money between them to make a record "on a shoestring budget". They enlisted ex-Boomtown Rats member Pete Briquette to produce their record. The Frames were soon being recognised by the producer Trevor Horn and a string of MTV Europe Music Awards nominations followed for the song "Revelate". Odlum co-produced the band's album Dance the Devil and also For the Birds with Steve Albini and Craig Ward which led to the band achieving acclaim at home and internationally. Having been a founding member of the band in 1990 Odlum left in November 2001/February 2002. Upon leaving The Frames soon afterwards he set about producing for other musical ensembles. He played guitar on Mic Christopher's Heyday EP. Christopher was another close friend of Odlum's and a member of the original Dublin street buskers. He also played drums and electric guitar on Mark Geary's 2004 album Ghosts. and produced Raining Down Arrows by Mundy. Odlum also gave a talk at The Music Show on 5 October 2008.

=== Bands ===
- Kíla (1987–1990)
- The Frames (1990 – 2001, 2002)

== Personal life ==
Odlum previously dated Gemma Hayes, having first met the singer in the Irish Film Centre's coffee shop. Hayes had called Odlum to ask him about making a demo and then invited him to one of her shows to hear her songs. They started recording at Mic Christopher's house as Odlum was living there at the time. When Christopher had a motorbike accident which led to broken ribs, a leg and a lengthy stay in hospital, the duo finished one of his songs and sang it to him in his hospital ward.

== Selected production work ==
Year	Artist	Album or Song Title(s)
2003	Josh Ritter	Hello Starling
2003	Paula Toledo	How Long
2004	Mundy	Raining Down Arrows
2005	The Frames	Burn the Maps
2007	Eoin Coughlan	
2008	Ham Sandwich	Carry the Meek
2008	Luka Bloom	Eleven Songs
2009	Miriam Ingram	Trampoline
2010	Pilotlight	The Post War Musical
2010	John Deery & The Heads	Smoke & Mirrors
2012	Róisín O	The Secret Life of Blue
