= Breadcrumb trail =

Breadcrumb trail may refer to:

- Hansel and Gretel, a fairy tale in which the eponymous characters leave a trail of breadcrumbs
- Breadcrumb navigation, a graphical control element used as a navigational aid
- Breadcrumb Trail, a 2002 rock album by The Frames
- Breadcrumb Trail, a song by Slint from the album Spiderland
- Breadcrumb Trail, a 2014 documentary film about the band Slint
