= Coláiste Eoin =

School in Dublin, Ireland

Location
- Booterstown, County Dublin; Ireland
- Coordinates: 53.302365°N 6.204599°W

Information
- Motto: Fiat Justitia (Latin for 'Let justice be done')
- Established: 1969
- Chairperson: Liam Mac Amhlaigh
- Principal: Padraig Mac Donnachadh
- Staff: 35 approx.
- Gender: Male
- Enrollment: 500 approx.
- Colours: Yellow, White and Black
- Religious order: Christian Brothers
- Website: www.eoiniosagain.ie/eoin/

Coláiste Eoin is a Catholic voluntary Gaelcholáiste (Irish language secondary school) for boys, under the trusteeship of the Edmund Rice Schools Trust, in Booterstown, County Dublin, Ireland. It has hurling and Gaelic football teams, traditional Irish music bands, and Irish language debating teams. The school is financed by resources from the Department of Education and voluntary donations.

== Notable past pupils ==
- Peter Coonan – Actor, known for his role as Fran Cooney in the RTÉ One series Love/Hate,
- John Crown – Senator, member of 24th Seanad, consultant oncologist.
- Pádraig Cusack – Theatre Producer for the Royal National Theatre, London, Abbey Theatre and NCPA, Mumbai
- Ian Daly – Footballer playing for Dulwich Hamlet in the lower divisions of the English football leagues
- Coman Goggins - Former Dublin footballer and current commentator with TG4 and RTÉ
- Colm Mac Con Iomaire – Solo artists Member of The Frames, former member of Kíla
- Fiach Mac Conghail – Director of the Abbey Theatre and Senator
- Colm Mac Eochaidh – High Court judge
- John Mulholland (Journalist) – Editor of Guardian newspaper (US), Former-editor of the Observer.
- David Odlum – Former guitarist with Kíla and the Frames, now produces and records bands in France
- Fiachna Ó Braonáin – Member of Hothouse Flowers
- Dara Ó Briain – Stand-up Comedian and Television Presenter
- Con O'Callaghan – Dublin Senior County Footballer, All-Ireland medal winner
- Colm Ó Cíosóig – Member of My Bloody Valentine
- Ciarán Ó Cofaigh – TV and Film Producer and director of ROSG (Cré na Cille) and Eo Teilfís
- Colm Ó Maonlaí – Actor in various films and TV shows including British soap EastEnders
- Liam Ó Maonlaí – Member of Hothouse Flowers
- Aengus Ó Snodaigh – Historian, author and Sinn Féin TD, spokesperson on Social Protection and Communities
- Rossa Ó Snodaigh – Kíla multi-instrumentalist, composer for theatre and dance, author, producer and director of radió drama, TV presenter and director of An Puball Gaeilge at the Electric Picnic
- Davy Spillane – Uilleann pipe player and founding member of Moving Hearts
- Lorcan Tucker – Irish international cricketer

== Notable past teachers ==
- Tony Gregory – Independent TD

== Campus ==
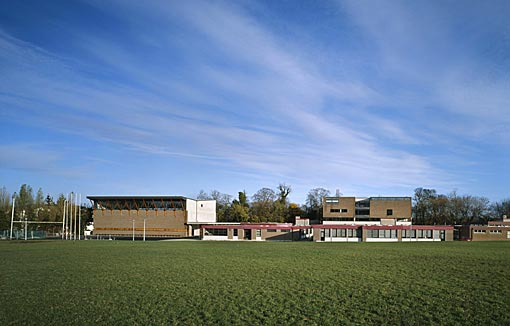
Coláiste Eoin's campus viewed from the Gaelic pitch, before construction of the new all weather pitch.

The school is 6 km from the Dublin city centre. The campus incorporates Coláiste Eoin and Coláiste Íosagáin's original 1970s-built buildings, a science block, an arts block, the newly built 3-storey classroom block and sports hall, and a large sports field with a football and hurling pitch.

== Coláiste Íosagáin ==
Coláiste Íosagáin is an Irish language Catholic voluntary secondary Gaelcholáiste for girls under the trusteeship of the Sisters of Mercy, which shares a campus with Coláiste Eoin. It was established in 1971, two years after Coláiste Eoin's establishment, to provide an Irish language education for girls in the South County Dublin Dublin area.
