= Fitzcarraldo (The Frames album) =

1995 album by the Frames

Studio album by The Frames DC
- Released: November 1995
- Genre: Rock
- Length: 49:21
- Label: ZTT Records / Warner Music UK
- Producer: Pete Briquette

The Frames DC chronology
Another Love Song (1992)	Fitzcarraldo (1995)	Fitzcarraldo (1996)

Fitzcarraldo is the second studio album by The Frames, released under the name The Frames DC to avoid confusion with the American band of the same name. Another version of the album would be published in 1996. The album was released on ZTT Records in November 1995. The Frames' line-up for Fitzcarraldo features Glen Hansard on guitar and vocals, Colm Mac Con Iomaire on violin, Graham Downey on bass guitar and keyboards, Dave Odlum on lead guitar, Paul Brennan on drums and Noreen O'Donnell on backing vocals. They also featured Pete Briquette on keyboards & programming, Dee Armstrong on viola and Kevin Murphy on cello. It was recorded at Totally Wired Studios, Dublin by Ivan O'Shea and Tom Skerrit and produced and mixed by Pete Briquette.

The title track's name comes from Werner Herzog's 1982 film Fitzcarraldo which frontman Hansard describes as being about a man "pulling a ship over a mountain".

== Track listing ==
1. "Revelate" (4:02)
2. "Angel At My Table" (3:54)
3. "Monument" (3:33)
4. "In This Boat Together" (4:20)
5. "Giving It All Away" (4:10)
6. "Say It To Me Now" (5:34)
7. "Denounced" (4:13)
8. "Red Chord" (4:27)
9. "Roger" (3:23)
10. "Fitzcarraldo" (11:35)
11. "Your Face" (Hidden track)

Fitzcarraldo

Studio album by The Frames DC
- Released: 29 October 1996
- Genre: Rock
- Length: 51:31
- Label: ZTT Records / Warner Music UK
- Producer: Pete Briquette, Trevor Horn

The Frames DC chronology
Fitzcarraldo (1995)	Fitzcarraldo (1996)	Dance the Devil (1999)

Professional ratings
Review scores
Source	Rating
Allmusic	link

== Re-release ==
Fitzcarraldo was re-issued by ZTT Records on 29 October 1996. Tracks 1–5 were produced by Trevor Horn and engineered by Steve Fitzmaurice, except track 1, which was engineered by Tom Elmhurst at Westside (London). These tracks were re-worked for the re-issue and "Roger" was replaced by "Evergreen" and the track order changed. Tracks 6–11 were recorded at Totally Wired Studios, Dublin by Ivan O'Shea and Tom Skerrit and produced and mixed by Pete Briquette and are the same as those on the previous release. All tracks were mixed by Steve Fitzmaurice.

=== Track listing ===
1. "Revelate" (3:48)
2. "Angel At My Table" (3:50)
3. "Fitzcarraldo" (6:03)
4. "Evergreen" (4:29)
5. "In This Boat Together" (5:17)
6. "Say It To Me Now" (5:34)
7. "Monument" (3:43)
8. "Giving It All Away" (4:15)
9. "Red Chord" (4:35)
10. "Denounced" (4:27)
11. "Your Face" (5:44)

=== Chart positions ===
Country	Position
Ireland	26
