= Online Film Critics Society Awards 2007 =

11th Online Film Critics Society Awards

11th Online Film Critics Society Awards

January 8, 2008

Best Picture:
No Country for Old Men

The 11th Online Film Critics Society Awards, honoring the best in film for 2007, were given on 9 January 2008.

== Winners and nominees ==
=== Best Picture ===
No Country for Old Men

- Atonement
- Juno
- There Will Be Blood
- Zodiac

=== Best Director ===
Joel & Ethan Coen – No Country for Old Men

- Paul Thomas Anderson – There Will Be Blood
- David Cronenberg – Eastern Promises
- David Fincher – Zodiac
- Julian Schnabel – The Diving Bell and the Butterfly

=== Best Actor ===
Daniel Day-Lewis – There Will Be Blood

- George Clooney – Michael Clayton
- Emile Hirsch – Into the Wild
- Frank Langella – Starting Out in the Evening
- Viggo Mortensen – Eastern Promises

=== Best Actress ===
Julie Christie – Away from Her

- Marion Cotillard – La Vie en Rose
- Angelina Jolie – A Mighty Heart
- Laura Linney – The Savages
- Elliot Page – Juno

=== Best Supporting Actor ===
Javier Bardem – No Country for Old Men

- Casey Affleck – The Assassination of Jesse James by the Coward Robert Ford
- Philip Seymour Hoffman – Charlie Wilson's War
- Hal Holbrook – Into the Wild
- Tom Wilkinson – Michael Clayton

=== Best Supporting Actress ===
Amy Ryan – Gone Baby Gone

- Cate Blanchett – I'm Not There
- Jennifer Garner – Juno
- Kelly Macdonald – No Country for Old Men
- Saoirse Ronan – Atonement
- Tilda Swinton – Michael Clayton

=== Best Original Screenplay ===
Juno – Diablo Cody

- Before the Devil Knows You're Dead – Kelly Masterson
- Eastern Promises – Steven Knight
- Michael Clayton – Tony Gilroy
- Ratatouille – Brad Bird

=== Best Adapted Screenplay ===
No Country for Old Men – Joel & Ethan Coen

- Atonement – Christopher Hampton
- The Diving Bell and the Butterfly – Ronald Harwood
- There Will Be Blood – Paul Thomas Anderson
- Zodiac – James Vanderbilt

=== Best Foreign Language Film ===
The Diving Bell and the Butterfly

- The Host
- The Lives of Others
- The Orphanage
- La Vie en Rose

=== Best Documentary ===
The King of Kong: A Fistful of Quarters

- In the Shadow of the Moon
- Into Great Silence
- No End in Sight
- Sicko

=== Best Animated Feature ===
Ratatouille

- Beowulf
- Paprika
- Persepolis
- The Simpsons Movie

=== Best Cinematography ===
No Country for Old Men – Roger Deakins

- The Assassination of Jesse James by the Coward Robert Ford – Roger Deakins
- Atonement – Seamus McGarvey
- The Diving Bell and the Butterfly – Janusz Kamiński
- There Will Be Blood – Robert Elswit

=== Best Editing ===
No Country for Old Men – Joel & Ethan Coen

- Atonement – Paul Tothill
- The Bourne Ultimatum – Christopher Rouse
- There Will Be Blood – Dylan Tichenor
- Zodiac – Angus Wall

=== Best Original Score ===
There Will Be Blood – Jonny Greenwood

- The Assassination of Jesse James by the Coward Robert Ford – Nick Cave and Warren Ellis
- Atonement – Dario Marianelli
- Into the Wild – Michael Brook, Kaki King, and Eddie Vedder
- Once – Glen Hansard and Markéta Irglová

=== Breakthrough Filmmaker ===
Sarah Polley – Away from Her

- Ben Affleck – Gone Baby Gone
- Juan Antonio Bayona – The Orphanage
- John Carney – Once
- Tony Gilroy – Michael Clayton

=== Breakthrough Performer ===
Nikki Blonsky – Hairspray

- Glen Hansard – Once
- Sam Riley – Control
- Tang Wei – Lust, Caution
- Carice van Houten – Black Book
