= Another Love Song (album) =

Studio album by The Frames
- Released: 1991
- Recorded: Master Rock Studios, Blackwing Studios, Windmill Lane Studios, STS Dublin, Xeric Studios, Maison Rouge, AIR Studios, Konk Studios
- Genre: Rock
- Length: 45:08
- Label: Island
- Producers: Gil Norton (tracks 1, 4, 7, 8, 10 and 12), Al Clay (tracks 2, 3, 5, 9, 11), The Frames (track 6)

The Frames chronology
Another Love Song (1991)	Fitzcarraldo (1995)

Professional ratings
Review scores
Source	Rating
Allmusic	2.5/5 stars
Musicmatch	favourable

Another Love Song is the debut studio album by Irish rock band The Frames. First released in 1991 on Island Records, the album went out of print a few years after its original release and has become a collector's item among fans. The singles "The Dancer" and "Masquerade", the former being used as the soundtrack to Match of the Day's 'Goal of the Week' segment in the early 1990s.

The album was remastered in 2010, and re-released on 5 July with 8 bonus tracks. The re-released version is re-packaged in a slipcase with a 12-page booklet, with photos and song lyrics.

== Track listing ==
1. "The Dancer" 3:22
2. "You Were Wrong" 3:53
3. "Right Road (Wrong Road)" 3:29
4. "Before You Go" 5:08
5. "The Waltz" 3:09
6. "Downhill From Here" 3:46
7. "Masquerade" 3:43
8. "Picture of Love" 4:49
9. "Martha" 3:31
10. "Another Love Song" 3:06
11. "Telegraph Poles" 4:26
12. "Live Forever" 2:46

=== Bonus tracks (Re-release only) ===
13. "Last Song To You"
14. "Stamp My Name"
15. "Teardrops In My Wine"
16. "Nixxi Focal"
17. "Before You Go" (full version)
18. "The Dancer" (acoustic version)
19. "Life’s a Gas"
20. "Shake You"

== Personnel ==
- Glen Hansard: Acoustic and electric guitars, vocals
- Noreen O'Donnell: Vocals
- Dave Odlum: Acoustic and electric guitars
- Colm Mac Con Iomaire: Violin, keyboards, vocals
- John Carney: Bass, vocals
- Paul "Binzer" Brennan: Drums, percussion
