= Another Love Song =

Another Love Song may refer to:

- Another Love Song (album), a 1991 album by The Frames
- "Another Love Song" (Insane Clown Posse song), 1999
- "Another Love Song" (Ne-Yo song), 2017
- "Another Love Song", a song by Leona Lewis from I Am
- "Another Love Song", a song by Mike Posner from 31 Minutes to Takeoff
- "Another Love Song", a song by Queens of the Stone Age from Songs for the Deaf
- "Another Love Song", a song by Uncle Kracker from Happy Hour

== See also ==
- Another Love (disambiguation)
