= Interference (band) =

Irish musical group

- Origin: Cork, Ireland
- Genres: Rock, indie rock, folk
- Years active: 1984–present
- Labels: SoundSound, Whelans, Shack
- Members: James O'Leary; Paul Tiernan; Camilla Griehsel; Cal McCarthy; Maurice Seezer; John Fitzgerald; Anthony Noonan; Marja Gaynor; Bertrand Galen; Malcolm MacClancy; Colm McCaughey />Maurice Culligan
- Past members: Glen Hansard (deceased); Fergus O'Farrell (deceased); Kevin Murphy; Justin Healy; Jerry Fehily; Joey Pleass; Willie Walsh; Cian Roche; Raymond McCann
- Website: interference.ie

Interference is an Irish band established in 1984 and originally headed by the late singer-songwriter Fergus O'Farrell. As of 2022, the live lineup consists of members Glen Hansard, Paul Tiernan, Camilla Griehsel, James O'Leary, Colm McCaughey, Maurice Seezer, Cal McCarthy, Anthony Noonan, John Fitzgerald, Bertrand Galen, Marja Gaynor, and Maurice Culligan.

== Early beginnings ==
The band was initially formed by James O'Leary and Fergus O'Farrell in 1984 in Cork, Ireland. In the early 2000s, the band created an alternative project, Dog Tail Soup. This project featured a lineup of musicians, including Swedish artist Camilla Griehsel, Maurice Seezer, and several others.

=== DogTail Soup ===
The band devised an alter ego, where each of them would alternate the role of singer, performing their songs and covers. The name DogTail Soup was derived from a line in one of Black's songs, "Cold Chicken Skin".

Interference and DogTail Soup developed a following in the Czech Republic and Slovakia in the 2000s after several regional tours.

DogTail Soup released an album, Rough, in 2008 on a music label, Nero Schwar (an independent label established by Colin Vearncombe, one of the co-creators of Dogtail Soup).

=== Once & "Gold" ===
Interference outings became sporadic as O’Farrell's health caused long periods of inactivity. During this time, O'Farrell would write the song "Gold" as a solo composition. "Gold" then featured in John Carney's 2007 film Once during a house party scene where Interference performs the song. The song would become synonymous with Once and lead to it also being featured in Once: The Musical. The success of "Gold" led O'Farrell to sign a publishing deal with Warner Chappell Music.

== The deaths of Black and O'Farrell ==
Black died in a car crash on 26 January 2016. O'Farrell died from muscular dystrophy a week later on 2 February 2016.

In 2017, a tribute concert was organized to celebrate O'Farrell and his work. To coincide with these performances, the second Interference album, The Sweet Spot, produced by Dan Dan Fitzgerald, was released on 2 February 2017.

Eleven of these were remastered by Bob Ludwig in Gateway Mastering Studios, Portland, Maine, USA.

== Awards and notable features ==
The band was featured in the 2007 Academy Award-winning movie Once. Songs by Interference have also been included in the soundtracks for Alan Gilsenan's All Souls Day and Damien O’Donnell's Inside I'm Dancing. A collaboration with Glen Hansard, the song 'Don't Go Down' features in the John Carney film Sing Street.

In 2018, Trinity College Dublin's Music Society awarded Interference an honorary patronage to the College Faculty in recognition of their contribution to Irish Music.

== Documentaries ==
A film documentary on the life of O'Farrell, titled Breaking Out was released in November 2021. Filmed over ten years, it follows the history of O'Farrell and his band. From their recording studio set-up in Dublin in the early '90s, the last recording sessions before O'Farrell's death from muscular dystrophy in early 2016, and the release of their last album, The Sweet Spot, in 2017.

To accompany the film's release, the 31 Interference tracks heard in the film were made into a soundtrack album.
