= Another Love =

Another Love may refer to:

- Another Love (Hungarian: Törvényen belül), English translation of novella by Hungarian writer Erzsébet Galgóczi
- "Another Love (Stories song)", 1974
- "Another Love (Tom Odell song)", 2012
- "(There Will Never Be) Another Love", a song by Gladys Knight & the Pips, 1964
- "Another Love", a song by Alice Smith
- Bambaşka Biri (international title: Another Love), a 2023 Turkish drama series

== See also ==
- Another Way (1982 film) (Hungarian: Egymásra nézve), Hungarian film directed by Károly Makk based on the novella
- Another Love Song (disambiguation)
