= Gamblers' Ballet =

Studio album by Kíla
- Released: 10 August 2007
- Recorded: 2007
- Genre: Irish folk music
- Label: Kíla Records
- Producer: Karl Odlum, Lance Hogan and Kíla

Kíla chronology
Kíla & Oki (2006)	Gamblers' Ballet (2007)

Gamblers' Ballet is a 2007 album by the Irish folk band Kíla. It was nominated for the Choice Music Prize for Irish Album of the Year 2007. The opening track "Leath Ina Dhiaidh A hOcht" (half eight) was the first single taken from the album. "Cardinal Knowledge" was used as the outro music for the Cartoon Saloon, Oscar nominated animation The Secret of Kells, and "Dúisigí" and "Cabhraigí Léi" were used in the Japanese film Kadokawa, which was directed by Ryuichi Hiroki.

== Track listing ==
1. "Leath ina Dhiaidh a hOcht" – 3.18
2. "Electric Landlady" – 4.47
3. "Cardinal Knowledge" – 5.09
4. "Dúisígí" – 3.39
5. "Seo mo Leaba" – 4.09
6. "Fir Bolg" – 5.32
7. "Boy Racer" – 4.18
8. "Her Royal Waggeldy Toes" – 4.06
9. "Cabhraigí Léi" – 4.48
