= Dance the Devil =

1999 studio album by the Frames

Dance the Devil...

Studio album by The Frames
- Released: 25 June 1999 (Ireland); 12 July 1999 (UK); 10 August 1999 (USA)
- Genre: Rock
- Length: 44:51
- Label: ZTT
- Producer: The Frames; David Odlum; Steve Fitzmaurice; Tom Elmhirst; Trevor Horn (tracks 3 and 7)

The Frames chronology
Fitzcarraldo (1996)	Dance the Devil... (1999)	For the Birds (2001)

Professional ratings
Review scores
Source	Rating
AllMusic	3/5 stars

Dance the Devil... is the third studio album by Dublin based band The Frames. The album was first released in Ireland on 25 June 1999 on ZTT Records and subsequently in the UK and USA later in the year. On this album the band returned to using their original name in place of the moniker The Frames DC employed on Fitzcarraldo. The band's line-up for this album featured Glen Hansard on guitar and vocals, Colm Mac Con Iomaire on violin, Joseph Doyle on bass guitar and backing vocals, Dave Odlum on lead guitar, Earl Harvin and Graham Hopkins on drums. Doyle replaced Graham Downey on bass.

The song "Seven Day Mile" appears in On the Edge, which was directed and co-written by former Frames bassist, John Carney. It also appeared near the end of House, M.D. Episode 2, Season 6, "Broken". The song "Pavement Tune" is featured in commercials for the NBC show quarterlife. The song "Neath the Beeches" was written about musician Jeff Buckley, a friend of Hansard's.

== Track listing ==
All songs are written by Glen Hansard and the Frames unless otherwise noted.

1. "Perfect Opening Line"
2. "Seven Day Mile"
3. "Pavement Tune"
4. "Plateau"
5. "Star Star**"
6. "The Stars Are Underground"
7. "God Bless Mom"
8. "Rent Day Blues" (Glen Hansard, The Frames, R. Ball, C Smith, G. Brown, J. Taylor, R. Mickens, E. Toon, D. Thomas, R. Bell, E. Deodato)
9. "Hollocaine"
10. "Neath the Beeches"
11. "Dance the Devil Back into His Hole" (Glen Hansard, The Frames, Leslie Bricusse, Anthony Newley)

Bonus tracks Collector's Edition (remastered)

12. "Steal My Body Home"
13. "Look Back Now"
14. "Taking the Hard Way Out"
15. "Perfect Opening Line" (Hook End Version)
16. "Country Song" (8-track Version)

== Chart positions ==
Country	Position
Ireland	28
