= Rob Bochnik =

American musician, audio engineer and singer-songwriter

- Born: Chicago, Illinois US
- Occupations: Musician, songwriter
- Instruments: Guitar, mandolin, vocals
- Years active: 1990–present
- Labels: Plateau, ANTI-, SEN
- Website: www.theframes.ie

Rob Bochnik (born 1973) is an American musician, audio engineer, singer and songwriter. He is guitarist with The Frames, has worked with The Swell Season, The Butcher Shop Quartet and records as a solo artist. He has worked on several projects as an audio engineer including the Grammy-nominated Once soundtrack and Set List, The Frames' 2003 live album.

== Biography ==
Bochnik was born in Chicago, Illinois, United States. He is a graduate of DePaul University where he studied music, recording, and classical guitar. He holds a Bachelor of Science degree for sound recording technology with a minor in physics. While still a student, he adapted Igor Stravinsky's The Rite of Spring to be playable by a classic rock quartet of two guitars, bass and drums.

During and after college, Bochnik played guitar in a local Chicago band called Garden Bower. He also played in The Butcher Shop Quartet, which arranged, recorded and performed the Rite of Spring, by Igor Stravinsky, for two guitars, bass and drums (rock band format). During this time he also worked at Steve Albini's recording studio, Electrical Audio. He worked there as an audio engineer and assisted in constructing the studios and maintaining them.

In 2002, he began playing guitar and touring with The Frames. In 2003 he was asked to join the band and has been recording and touring with them ever since. The Frames have toured the world and have shared billings with Bob Dylan, Neil Young, and Levon Helm. In 2007, he released a solo album, Blowing Out the Cobwebs. In 2008, he began touring with The Swell Season. He played guitar and mandolin on the band's current release "Strict Joy" and toured extensively with the band. Bochnik contributed to Marketa Irglova's debut album, *Anar (2011), and has toured with her through Europe and the States.
