= My Little Funhouse =

Rock band

- My Little Funhouse, 1992

Background information
- Genres: Hard Rock
- Years active: 1990–1996
- Label: Geffen Records
- Past members: Alan Lawlor : vocals; Anthony "Tony" Morrissey : guitar; Brendan Morrissey : guitar; Gary Deevy : bass (1990–1993); Joe Doyle : bass (1993–1996); Derek Maher : drums (1990–1993); Graham Hopkins : drums (1993–1996)

My Little Funhouse were a rock band from County Kilkenny, Ireland in the early 1990s.

After winning the Carling Hot Press band competition, they got signed to Island Publishing and went on, in late 1991, to sign what was Geffen Records' largest deal to that date: $2 million (around the same time, Geffen signed Nirvana for $60,000). Geffen saw them as the next Guns N' Roses, and even included them in the video of November Rain.

Their debut album Standunder comprises heavy rock'n'roll and slower, more intimate songs. Guitars are prominent, as was typical of the early 1990s. Alan Lawlor's vocals are very distinctive and make a strong impression. The album enjoyed some success and several songs were released as singles: "I Want Some of That", "Wishing Well", "Destiny"/"L.S.D" and "Raintown". The video for "Raintown", directed by Rich Murray and starring actor Jack Nance ("Eraserhead, Twin Peaks) played in rotation on MTV for several weeks.

Drummer Derek Maher left in 1993 to be replaced by Graham Hopkins (who later joined the band Therapy? in early 1996).

My Little Funhouse members moved to Los Angeles and started to record more material that never got to be released.

== Members ==
- Alan Lawlor : vocals (1990–1996)
- Anthony "Tony" Morrissey : guitar (1990–1996)
- Brendan Morrissey : guitar (1990–1996)
- Gary Deevy : bass (1990–1993)
- Joe Doyle: bass (1993–1996)
- Derek Maher: drums (1990–1993)
- Graham Hopkins: drums (1993–1996)

== Discography ==
=== Addicted EP (1992) ===
Track list:

1. "I Want Some of That"
2. "Addicted"
3. "No More Lies"
4. "Standunder"

=== Standunder CD (1992) ===
Label: Geffen Records

Track list:

1. "I Want Some of That"
2. "Destiny"
3. "Wishing Well"
4. "L.S.D."
5. "I Know What I Need" (turns to "You Blew It", a non-listed track, around 3m 24s)
6. "Catholic Boy"
7. "Lonely"
8. "Anonymous"
9. "Been Too Long"
10. "Raintown"
11. "Standunder"

=== Forward Came CD (1996) (Unreleased) ===
Label: Geffen Records

=== Pulse CD (199?) (Unreleased) ===
Label: Geffen Records
