= For the Birds (The Frames album) =

Studio album by The Frames
- Released: 2 April 2001
- Genre: Rock
- Label: Plateau

The Frames chronology
Dance the Devil... (1999)	For the Birds (2001)	Breadcrumb Trail (2002)

Professional ratings
Review scores
Source	Rating
AllMusic	3/5 stars
The A.V. Club	(favorable)
Pitchfork	(7.5/10)
Spin	(7/10)
Rolling Stone	(favorable)

For the Birds is the fourth studio album by Dublin based band The Frames. The album was first released in Ireland on 2 April 2001 on Plateau Records, the Frames' own indie label. The band's line-up for this album featured Glen Hansard on guitar and vocals, Colm Mac Con Iomaire on violin, Joseph Doyle on bass guitar and backing vocals, Dave Odlum on lead guitar and Dave Hingerty on drums with additional keyboards by Dave Odlum's Brother Karl Odlum.

According to the album notes, recording took place in a wide variety of places: "recorded by Steve Albini, Craig Ward and David Odlum at Electrical Audio, Chicago and in Ventry, Kerry at Joan's house with additional recording and mixing at various bedrooms and houses including Black Box, La Dionae France, Trevor Hutchinson's, Mic Christopher's and Mrs Odlums."

In May 2009 "For the Birds" was voted by writers of the Irish music website CLUAS.com as the best Irish album released between 1999 and 2009.

On 30 March 2011 The Frames played the album in full at a 10th Anniversary gig in Dublin's Vicar Street (featuring Dave Odlum on guitar), before playing 13 more songs, either from their back catalogue or special performances with friends. Joining the band on stage at Vicar Street were Liam O'Maonlai, Bronagh Gallagher, Damien Rice, Interference and others.

== Track listing ==
All songs written by Glen Hansard, except where noted.

1. "In the Deep Shade" (Rachel Grimes, Hansard, Dave Odlum) (3:29)
2. "Lay Me Down" (3:11)
3. "What Happens When the Heart Just Stops" (4:20)
4. "Headlong" (5:20)
5. "Fighting on the Stairs" (3:22)
6. "Giving Me Wings" (3:34)
7. "Early Bird" (5:04)
8. "Friends and Foe" (4:07)
9. "Santa Maria" (6:57)
10. "Disappointed" (3:09)
11. "Mighty Sword" (9:42)

== Personnel ==
- Glen Hansard – vocals, guitar
- Colm Mac Con Iomaire – keyboards, vocals, violin
- Joe Doyle – bass guitar, vocals
- Juli de Mott – backing vocals
- Dave Odlum – guitar
- Dave Hingerty – drums, percussion
- Karl Odlum – keyboards, banjo, programming

== Chart positions ==
Country	Position
Ireland	41
