= Boss Volenti =

Irish rock band

- Origin: Dublin, Ireland
- Genre: Rock
- Years active: 2003–2008
- Past members: Rob Daly; Dan O’Connor; Laura Mackey; Graham Hopkins; Martin Murphy

Boss Volenti were an Irish rock quartet from Dublin formed in 2003. Rob Daly, Martin Murphy and Dan O'Connor first met while playing in bands around Dublin. Then followed Laura Mackey, who O'Connor met while both were studying guitar at college. Following Murphy's departure, drummer Graham Hopkins met the band in 2005 when they were demoing recordings for their first album and asked if he could join. The band's influences included Thin Lizzy, Al Green, Yeah Yeah Yeahs and Hall & Oates.

== Career ==
In February 2006, Boss Volenti independently released a single, "Deeper Than Deep", and it went straight into the Top 40 Irish Singles Chart. They released a second single, "Ain't No Use", in June to even greater success. It received heavy daytime airplay on Irish radio, was playlisted by 2FM, championed by Tony Fenton on Today FM and regularly played on BBC NI Radio. Boss Volenti released their first album, Boss Volenti, in Ireland and on iTunes on 8 September 2006.

They performed at Electric Picnic 2008 after which Graham Hopkins left the band.

== Band members ==
- Rob Daly – vocals, bass guitar
- Dan O’Connor – guitar, backing vocals
- Laura Mackey – guitar
- Graham Hopkins – drums, backing vocals
- Martin Murphy – drums, backing vocals

== Discography ==
=== Albums ===
- Boss Volenti (2006)
