= Kíla =

Irish musical group

Background information
- Origin: Dublin, Ireland
- Genres: Irish folk
- Years active: 1987–present
- Label: Kíla Records
- Members: Rossa Ó Snodaigh; Rónán Ó Snodaigh; Colm Ó Snodaigh; Dee Armstrong; Brian Hogan; Seanán Brennan; Dave Hingerty; James Mahon
- Website: www.kila.ie

Kíla is an Irish folk fusion music group.

== History ==
=== Early formation ===
The original lineup of the band included Rossa Ó Snodaigh (whistle and bones), Rónán Ó Snodaigh (bodhrán), Eoin Dillon (uilleann pipes), Colm Mac Con Iomaire (fiddle), Karl Odlum (bass) and David Odlum (guitar). The group formed in 1987 in Coláiste Eoin, an Irish language secondary school in County Dublin.

In 1988, one of Rossa and Rónán's older brother's, flute player Colm Ó Snodaigh, joined the band. Rónán, Rossa and Colm are brothers of Teachta Dála, Aengus Ó Snodaigh, and sons of Pádraig Ó Snodaigh and Clíodna Cussen.

Kíla started out busking in Dublin. In their first year, they busked on Grafton Street nearly every week. Their first paying concert was upstairs in the Baggot Inn and was attended by only three people, one of whom was the broadcaster Bláthnaid Ní Chofaigh.

=== Tours and collaborations ===
In 1988, they went abroad to play at their first festival in Germany and made their first recording titled Éist - a collection of 10 of Colm's songs. Since then, Kíla have played at a range of festivals across Europe, including Cambridge Folk Festival,, the Glastonbury Festival, and at the opening ceremony of the 2003 Special Olympics in Ireland.

In 2006, the band collaborated with Ainu-Japanese artist OKI on the album "Kila & Oki."

In 2008, Kíla recorded "The Ballad of Ronnie Drew" along with other artists as a tribute to the Dubliners singer. In 2010, the band collaborated with French composer Bruno Coulais on the soundtrack of Cartoon Saloon's Oscar-nominated movie, The Secret of Kells. In the same year, their music was featured in three films: Maeve Murphy's Beyond the Fire, Ciarán O'Connor's Trafficked, and the award-winning Peter J. McCarthy documentary, Fight or Flight. In late 2011, Kíla published Book of Tunes, a book containing over 100 of their compositions, photos, poems and prose.

In 2015, the band collaborated with Bruno Coulais on the music for the Oscar-nominated animated feature, Song of the Sea, and they received an Annie Award nomination for 'Outstanding Achievement in Music in an Animated Feature Production'. They also received an Emmy nomination for their work on the "Crossing The Line" production called, The Secret Life of the Shannon.

In 2020, Kíla recorded music for the 2019 film Arracht (for which they won an IFTA) and the 2020 film Wolfwalkers. Arracht was nominated for 11 IFTA awards and won two, with Kíla awarded 'Best Original Score'. During the two COVID-19 lockdowns, the band performed six online concerts in a Wolfwalker-themed Saint Patrick's Day broadcast. After the lockdowns, they went on tour and produced three shows: Kíla & Tumble Circus (September 2021), Kíla le Prás (New Year's Eve 2021) and Kíla & Cairde for TradFest in the National Stadium (January 2022).

== Members ==
In 1988, flute player and singer Colm Ó Snodaigh joined the group. In 1991, fiddler Colm Mac Con Iomaire and guitarist Dave Odlum left Kíla to join the band The Frames. Dee Armstrong replaced Colm on fiddle and guitarist Eoin O'Brien, lead guitarist Dave Reidy also joined. In 1994, Karl Odlum left and joined Mick Christopher's band The Mary Janes; he was replaced by jazz bassist Ed Kelly, who left in 1995 along with Eoin O'Brien after the release of Mind The Gap. Drummer and rhythm guitarist Lance Hogan took Eoin's place and Laurence O'Keefe filled in on bass until Brian Hogan became bass player prior to recording Tóg É Go Bog É (1996).

In 2009, Donegal guitarist Seanán Brennan joined the band to replace Lance, who was on a sabbatical. In 2010, drummer Dave Hingerty was invited to join the band. In 2015, piper Eoin Dillon left and James Mahon replaced him. in 2023 Dee Armstrong discontinued playing with the band and pursued a solo career.

=== Current members ===
- Rossa Ó Snodaigh: mandolin, whistles and percussion (1987–present)
- Rónán Ó Snodaigh: bodhrán and singer (1987–present)
- Colm Ó Snodaigh: fluter and singer (1988–present)
- Brian Hogan: bass (1996–present)
- Seanán Brennan: acoustic and electric guitar, bass and mandola (2009–present)
- Dave Hingerty: drums (2010–present)
- James Mahon: flute, uilleann pipes and whistles (2015–present)

=== Former members ===
- Dee Armstrong: fiddle, percussion and hammered dulcimer (1991–2023)
- Eoin Dillon: píobaí uileann (1987–2015)
- Lance Hogan: guitar, djembe and drum kit (1995–2009)
- Laurence O'Keefe: bass (1995–1996)
- Eoin O'Brien: acoustic and electric guitar (1991–1995)
- Ed Kelly: bass (1994–1995)
- Karl Odlum: bass (1987–1994)
- David Reidy: electric guitar (1991–1992)
- Dave Odlum: acoustic guitar (1987–1991)
- Colm Mac Con Iomaire: fiddle (1987–1991)

== Gallery ==
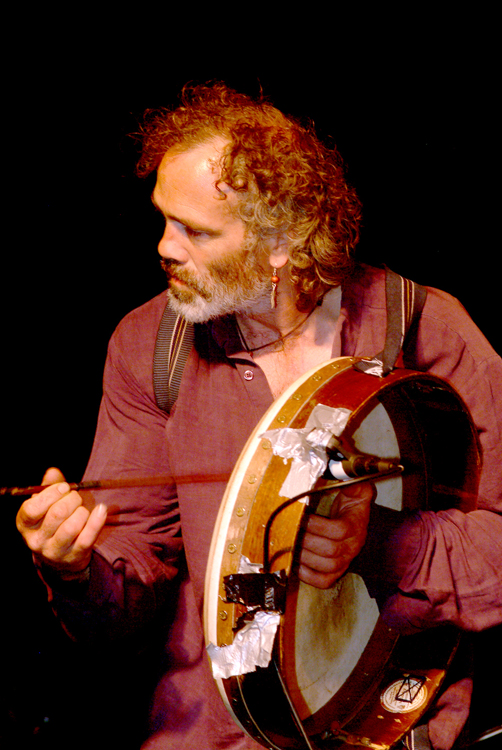
Rónán Ó Snodaigh

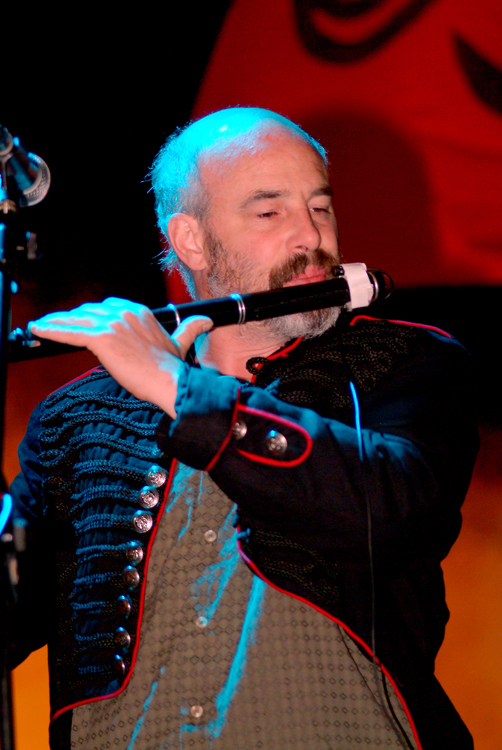
Colm Ó Snodaigh

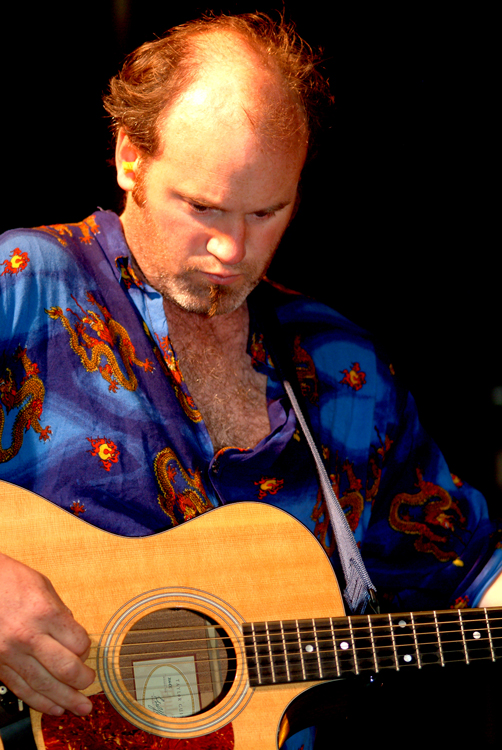
Rossa Ó Snodaigh

== Discography ==
=== Studio albums ===
- Kíla & Brass - Raise the Road (2025)
- Suas Síos (2014)
- Soisín (2010)
- Gamblers' Ballet (2007) – [No. 34 Ire]
- Kíla and Oki (2006) – with Oki
- Luna Park (2003) – [No. 15 Ire]
- Lemonade and Buns (2000) – [No. 31 Ire]
- Tóg É Go Bog É (1997) – [No. 27 Ire, No. 55 Auz]
- Mind the Gap (1995)
- Handel's Fantasy (1993)
- Groovin' (1991) – 6-track début

=== Live albums ===
- Kíla – Alive Beo (2017)
- Live in Dublin (2004)
- Live in Vicar St. (2000)

=== Soundtrack albums ===
- Arracht – film soundtrack (2021) - IFTA award for Best Music (2020)
- Wolfwalkers – film soundtrack with Bruno Coulais (2021)
- Croc Blanc/White Fang – film soundtrack with Bruno Coulais (2018) - as session band only
- Song of the Sea – film soundtrack with Bruno Coulais (2015) - music nominated for Annie Award (2015)
- The Secret of Kells – film soundtrack with Bruno Coulais (2009)
- Monkey – soundtrack to West End pantomime (2002)

=== Compilation albums ===
- Rogha - The Best Of Kíla – double album (2009)
- Best of and Live in Dublin – double album, in Japan only (2005)

=== Remix albums ===
- Another Beat - Japan only (2006)

=== EPs ===
- Ómós - do Mícheál D. Ó hUigín (2025)

=== Singles ===
- Cé a Chum (2026)
- Cara Liom – featuring the Paul Frost Brass (2023)
- Raise the Road – featuring the Paul Frost Brass (2023)
- Cúrsaí Grá – radio single (2019)
- Cardinal Knowledge – radio edit (2009)
- The Ballad of Ronnie Drew – with U2, The Dubliners and A Band of Bowsies (2008), [No. 1 Ire]
- Cabhraigí Léi/Nothing Changes Around Here – remixes with The Thrills giveaway with Hot Press (2007)
- Leath ina dhiaidh a hOcht – radio edit (2007)
- hAon Dó and Ní Liom Féin – with Oki, radio edits (2006)
- Tóg é go Bog é – with Oki; featuring remixes by Sakana and Oki (2005)
- An Tiománaí – with Heatwave; featuring remix by Sakana (2005)
- Glanfaidh Mé – radio edit (2003)
- Tóg é go Bog é – live Christmas single (2002)
- Ón Taobh Tuathail Amach (1997) – [No. 26 Ire]

=== DVDs ===
- Pot of Gold/Alive – 2 discs, DVD (Pota Óir) and CD (Alive Beo), in the United States only (2021)
- Cúl an Tí – 12 songs, 12 singers and 12 animators; in collaboration with Cartoon Saloon, Fócas Films and TG4 (2018)
- Kíla 'Once Upon a Time' – concert film filmed in Vicar St Dublin (2008) – [No. 2 Ire]
- Pota Óir – directed by Anthony White (2018)
- Live in Vicar St – bonus DVD with Luna Park (2003)
