= Live on Letterman =

Online music concert series

Live on Letterman was an online concert series webcast by CBS and Vevo. The concerts were filmed live in the Ed Sullivan Theater, the home of Late Show with David Letterman, and streamed on the CBS website. Despite the title, these concerts usually were not actually broadcast on Late Show with David Letterman.

== History ==
The concert series first started in the year 2010. It ended in 2015, when Letterman ended his 22 year run as host of Late Show.

== Past performers ==
- Adele
- Alicia Keys
- Band of Horses
- Beady Eye
- Ben Harper
- Bon Jovi
- Brad Paisley
- Broken Bells
- CAKE
- Carrie Underwood - Record for most viewed live show
- Coldplay
- Depeche Mode
- Dierks Bentley
- Elvis Costello
- Florence + The Machine
- Franz Ferdinand
- Foster The People
- Foo Fighters
- Incubus
- Katy Perry
- Kiss
- Glen Hansard
- Gorillaz
- J. Cole
- Jason Aldean
- Jennifer Hudson
- John Legend
- John Mayer (twice)
- Kings of Leon
- Lady Antebellum
- Lorde
- Maroon 5
- MGMT
- Mumford and Sons
- My Morning Jacket
- Norah Jones
- Oasis
- Passion Pit
- Pearl Jam - First official Live on Letterman
- Peter Gabriel
- Phish
- Phoenix
- Pitbull
- Queens of the Stone Age
- Ray LaMontagne
- Ryan Adams
- Sheryl Crow
- Silversun Pickups
- Snow Patrol
- Soundgarden
- St. Vincent
- Taylor Swift
- The Avett Brothers
- The Band Perry
- The Gaslight Anthem
- The Killers
- The Neighbourhood
- The Shins
- The Script
- The Temper Trap
- The Wallflowers
- The Wanted
- Train
- TV on the Radio
- Two Door Cinema Club
- Wilco
