= Seven Day Mile =

1999 song by The Frames

"Seven Day Mile" is a song by the Irish band The Frames, from their third album Dance the Devil. This song is often used as an opening song on their tours, and varies substantially in mood from the quiet, understated opening to the impassioned climax. "Seven Day Mile" also appears in the On The Edge film soundtrack, starring Irish Actor Cillian Murphy. The song also appears at the end of the second episode in the sixth season of the television show, House.
