= The Frames =

Irish rock band

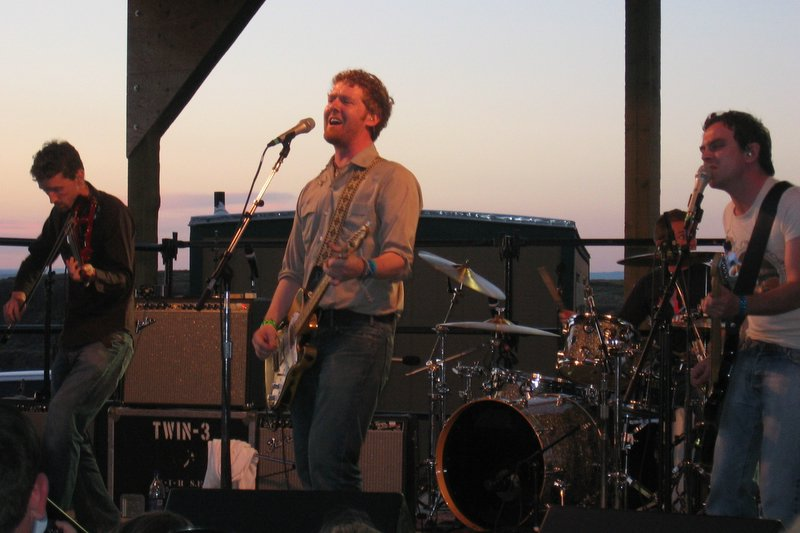
- The Frames performing at the Sasquatch Music Festival on 28 May 2005. From left to right: Colm Mac Con Iomaire, Glen Hansard, Johnny Boyle and Joe Doyle.

Background information
- Origin: Dublin, Ireland
- Genres: Rock; indie rock; folk
- Years active: 1990–present
- Labels: Plateau; ANTI-
- Members: Joe Doyle; Colm Mac Con Iomaire; Rob Bochnik; Graham Hopkins
- Past members: Glen Hansard; Noreen O'Donnell; Dave Odlum; Paul Brennan; John Carney; Graham Downey; Dave Hingerty; Johnny Boyle; Ruth O'Mahony Brady
- Website: theframes.ie

The Frames are an Irish rock band based in Dublin. Founded in 1990 by Glen Hansard, the band has been influential in the Dublin rock music scene. The group has released six studio albums. Until Hansard's death in 2026, the band's line-up included him, fellow original member Colm Mac Con Iomaire, Joe Doyle, and Rob Bochnik.

== History ==
The band was established in 1990, and consists of survivors of Dublin's prolific early 1990s rock and roll scene. Through support slots, the band was central to the development of many emerging Irish rock bands of the time, including Turn and Bell X1, and numerous singer-songwriters such as Mundy, Paddy Casey, David Kitt and Damien Dempsey. In December 2004, Hansard appeared on stage to collaborate with Paddy Casey and The Dublin Gospel Choir. In 2007, The Frames toured Australia and New Zealand as the support act for Bob Dylan.

The name The Frames came from Hansard's habit of fixing bicycles of his friends. The large number of bicycle frames lying around his house led neighbours to dub it the "house with the frames". In a 2001 interview, Hansard said, "I worked in a bicycle shop for a little while, but the name came from ... my back garden was so full of frames, my house became known as The Frames house, much to my mother's distaste, she hated it. But my garden was full of frames, old bikes, I would make up bikes for my friends out of all the old bikes. So it sort of became known if anybody found a bike up on the hill on the way home they would throw it into my garden, a graveyard for old bikes."

The band went through several member changes over the years, some of whom have also been, or later became, members of other Dublin rock bands. Colm Mac Con Iomaire and Dave Odlum both were founding members of folk group Kíla. Graham Downey, son of Thin Lizzy drummer Brian Downey, played bass for the band between 1993 and 1996.

The Frames have also collaborated closely with other groups that emerged from the buskers on Grafton Street, Dublin, where Hansard started his music career. Among these artists were Kíla and Mic Christopher. When Christopher died in 2001, Hansard and his band were heavily involved in organising the Skylarkin' concert to commemorate his life and release the album. The Frames have occasionally performed Christopher's songs, such as "Heyday", as a tribute.

The band is also known for interspersing snippets of songs by other artists into their own as a form of homage; notable examples include "Redemption Song" by Bob Marley, "Ring of Fire" by Johnny Cash, "Lilac Wine" by James Shelton (as made famous by Jeff Buckley and Elkie Brooks) and "Pure Imagination" from Willy Wonka & the Chocolate Factory.

In 1991, Hansard came to public attention after playing the role of "Outspan" Foster in the film The Commitments. However, Hansard regretted this role as he felt it distracted from his music career. Mac Con Iomaire also had a cameo in the film as a violinist auditioning for the band. Bronagh Gallagher, one of Hansard's colleagues, can be seen wearing a Frames T-shirt in her appearance in the film Pulp Fiction. Hansard also appeared on screen as the principal character parodied by Irish music comedy web site Eyebrowy.com and in 2007, as the lead role in the film Once which featured his songs.

In 2007, the band consisted of Glen Hansard, Joe Doyle, Colm Mac Con Iomaire, Rob Bochnik and Johnny Boyle. Various people played drums during 2003 and 2004, including Graham Hopkins who drummed Dance the Devil, Burn the Maps, and the band's 2006 album The Cost. On one version of the album Fitzcarraldo, the band used the name The Frames DC, to avoid confusion with an American band.

The band released its sixth studio album, The Cost, on 20 September 2006. They also performed at Lollapalooza 2006.

The band's song "Dream Awake" was used in the pilot episode of NBC's Life. Also, "Finally" was prominently featured in the 11th episode of the show, when the title character reaped the rewards of the detective work which he had been doing all season. However, a different song is used in the version of the episode on NBC's website. The band's song "Seven Day Mile" was used in the season six premiere of House on Fox.

The band's former bassist, John Carney, became a film director, best known for writing and directing the film Once, which stars Hansard, who wrote much of the music for the film. Hansard and Markéta Irglová won an Academy Award for Best Original Song for "Falling Slowly" from Once.

On 13 May 2008, the US iTunes store released a deluxe edition of The Cost. This edition included three extra songs, "The Blood", "No More I Love Yous", and "This Low". It also included the music videos for "Falling Slowly", "Sad Songs", and "The Side You Never Get to See".

In October 2009, the band appeared on The Swell Season's album, Strict Joy. On 24 March 2010, the band announced their first concert in three years at Electric Picnic to celebrate their 20th anniversary.

The song "Rise" from the album The Cost was featured at the end of an episode of the ABC series Castle in 2012.

On 1 December 2012, the band announced that the documentary In The Deep Shade would be released in 2013. The film, which captured their 2010 20th Anniversary Tour, was directed by Conor Masterson.

Following his success on Once, Hansard primarily focused on his solo career with his solo concerts often featuring several members of the Frames. However, the Frames continued to play several concerts; in June 2014, they played Whelan's in honor of its 25th anniversary, with the band buying all of the drinks for the audience. The venue's owners had lent money to the band in the 1990s to enable them to record Fitzcarraldo.

In 2015, the band played a pair of shows at Iveagh Gardens in Dublin. On 4 and 5 July 2015, they performed to their fans in such rarities as 15 Seafort Parade. On 11 July 2015, they played at the Marquee Festival in Cork.

In April 2020, the band postponed a sold-out show marking their 30th anniversary in Kilmainham, Dublin on 20 June 2020, due to the COVID-19 restrictions in Ireland. However, they decided to play a live set on Instagram from a secluded location in Ireland on the same date. The band subsequently rescheduled their three September 2020 shows in the US for dates in 2021, which were then cancelled due to complications with international travel restrictions and visas that prohibited the band to enter the country to perform.

The Frames eventually held its 30th anniversary show in the grounds of the Royal Hospital Kilmainham, Dublin on the evening of 28 May 2022, to an audience of approximately 10,000 people. Cormac Begley and Wallis Bird performed as opening acts before the Frames began their set at 8pm with a 25-song setlist to the audience. The concert was described as a "perfect summer's evening".

In July 2026, Hansard was killed in a motorcycle crash in Dublin at age 56.

== Members ==
=== Current ===
- Colm Mac Con Iomaire: keyboards, violin, vocals (1990–present)
- Joe Doyle: bass guitar, vocals (1996–present)
- Rob Bochnik: guitar, vocals (2002–present)
- Graham Hopkins: drums (2008–2019, 2026–present)

=== Former ===
- Glen Hansard: vocals, guitar (1990–2026, his death)
- Noreen O'Donnell: vocals (1990–1996)
- Dave Odlum: guitar (1990–2002) (Odlum later co-produced album Burn the Maps with Bochnik)
- Paul Brennan (Binzer): drums, percussion (1990–1998)
- John Carney: bass guitar, vocals (1990–1993)
- Graham Downey: bass guitar (1993–1996)
- Dave Hingerty: drums, percussion (1998–2003, 2019–2020)
- Johnny Boyle: drums (2003–2008, 2021–2025)
- Ruth O'Mahony Brady: keyboard (2020–2025)

== Discography ==
=== Albums ===
Title	Details	Peak chart positions			
Title	Details	IRE	BEL	NLD	US Heat
Another Love Song	Release date: 1991; Label: Island	77	—	—	—
Fitzcarraldo	Release date: November 1995; Re-release: 29 October 1996; Label: ZTT	26	—	—	—
Dance the Devil	Release date: 25 June 1999; Label: ZTT	28	—	—	—
For the Birds	Release date: 2 April 2001; Label: Plateau	6	—	—	—
Burn the Maps	Release date: 17 September 2004; Label: Plateau	1	85	54	—
The Cost	Release date: 20 September 2006; Label: Plateau, Anti-	2	—	—	46
Longitude	Release date: 10 July 2015; Label: Plateau, Anti-	7	130	—	—
"—" denotes a recording that did not chart or was not released in that territory.

=== Live albums ===
Title	Details	Peak chart positions
Title	Details	IRE
Breadcrumb Trail	Release date: June 2002; Label: Plateau	—
Set List	Release date: 16 May 2003; Label: Plateau	1

=== Singles and EPs ===
- "The Dancer" (1991)
- "Masquerade" (1992)
- Turn on Your Record Player EP (1992)
- Picture of Love (1993)
- Angel at My Table (1994)
- "Revelate" (1995)
- "Monument" (1996)
- I am the Magic Hand (15 February 1999)
- Pavement Tune (1999)
- Rent Day Blues EP (1999)
- Come on Up to the House (1999, Compilation featuring "Star Star" by The Frames)
- Lay Me Down (2001)
- Headlong (2002)
- The Roads Outgrown EP (2003)
- "Fake" (12 September 2003)
- "Finally" (20 August 2004)
- "Sideways Down" (28 January 2005)
- "Happy" (Radio Single Only – 2005)
- "Falling Slowly/No More I Love Yous" (1 September 2006)

== See also ==
- The Stars Are Underground
- The Swell Season
