= Once (film) =

2007 film by John Carney

- US theatrical release poster
- Directed by: John Carney
- Written by: John Carney
- Produced by: Martina Niland
- Starring: Glen Hansard; Markéta Irglová
- Cinematography: Tim Fleming
- Edited by: Paul Mullen
- Music by: Glen Hansard; Markéta Irglová; Interference
- Production companies: Samson Films; Bórd Scannán na hÉireann/Irish Film Board; RTÉ
- Distributed by: Buena Vista International
- Release dates: 20 January 2007 (Sundance); 23 March 2007 (Ireland)
- Running time: 86 minutes
- Country: Ireland
- Languages: English; Czech
- Budget: €112,000
- Box office: $23.3 million

Once is a 2007 Irish romantic musical drama film written and directed by John Carney. The film stars Glen Hansard and Markéta Irglová as two struggling musicians in Dublin, Ireland. Hansard and Irglová had previously performed music as the Swell Season, and composed and performed the film's original songs.

Once spent years in development with the Irish Film Board and was made for a budget of €112,000. It was a commercial success, earning substantial per-screen box-office averages in the United States, and received acclaim from critics. It received awards including the 2007 Independent Spirit Award for Best Foreign Film. Hansard and Irglová's song "Falling Slowly" won the 2008 Academy Award for Best Original Song (making Irglová the youngest person to win an Oscar in a non-acting category), and the soundtrack received a Grammy Award nomination. The film has also been adapted into a successful stage musical.

== Plot ==
A thirty-something busker (Guy) performs with his guitar on Grafton Street, Dublin, but his performance is interrupted when he chases a man who steals his money. Lured by his music, a 19-year-old Czech magazine and flower seller (Girl) talks to him about his songs. Delighted to learn that he repairs hoovers, Girl asks Guy to fix hers. The next day Girl returns with her broken vacuum and tells him she is also a musician.

At a music store where Girl usually plays piano, Guy teaches her one of his songs ("Falling Slowly"); they sing and play together. He invites her to his father's shop, and on the bus home musically answers Girl's question about what his songs are about: a long-time girlfriend who cheated on him, then left ("Broken Hearted Hoover Fixer Sucker Guy").

At the shop, Guy introduces Girl to his father and takes her to his room, but when he asks her to stay the night, she gets upset and leaves. The next day, they reconcile and spend the week writing, rehearsing and recording songs. Girl writes the lyrics for one of Guy's songs ("If You Want Me"), singing to herself while walking down the street; at a party, people perform impromptu (including "Gold").

Guy works on "Lies", a song about his ex-girlfriend, who moved to London. Girl encourages him to win her back. Invited to her home, he discovers she has a toddler and lives with her mother. Guy decides to move to London, but he wants to record a demo of his songs to take with him and asks Girl to record it with him. They secure a bank loan and reserve time at a recording studio.

Guy learns Girl has a husband in the Czech Republic. When he asks if she still loves her husband, Girl answers in Czech, "Miluju tebe" ("It's you, who I love"), but coyly declines to translate. After recruiting a band with other buskers, they go into the studio to record. They impress Eamon, the jaded studio engineer, with their first song ("When Your Mind's Made Up"). On a break in the early morning, Girl finds a piano in an empty studio and plays Guy one of her own compositions ("The Hill").

After the all-night session wraps up, they walk home. Before they part ways, Girl reveals that she spoke to her husband and he is coming to live with her in Dublin. Guy persuades her to spend his last night in Dublin with him, but she stands him up and he cannot find her to say goodbye before his flight. He plays the demo for his father, who gives him money to help him get settled in London. Before leaving for the airport, Guy buys Girl a piano and makes arrangements for its delivery, then calls his ex-girlfriend, who is happy about his imminent arrival. Girl reunites with her husband in Dublin and plays the piano in their home.

== Cast ==
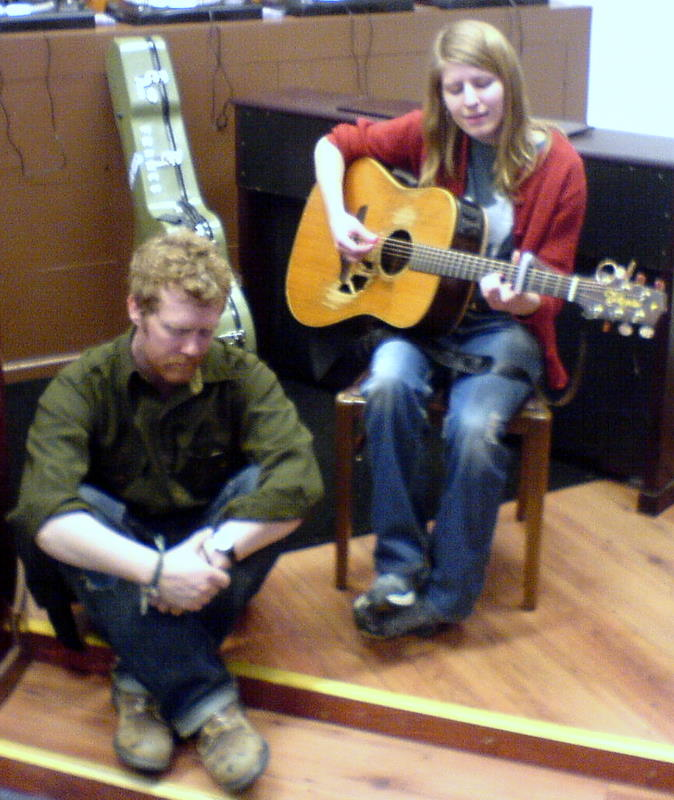
Once stars Glen Hansard and Markéta Irglová

- Glen Hansard as Guy
- Markéta Irglová as Girl
- Hugh Walsh as Timmy Drummer
- Gerard Hendrick as Lead Guitarist
- Alaistair Foley as Bassist
- Geoff Minogue as Éamon
- Bill Hodnett as Guy's Dad
- Danuse Ktrestova as Girl's Mother
- Darren Healy as Heroin Addict
- Mal Whyte as Bill
- Marcella Plunkett as Ex-girlfriend
- Niall Cleary as Bob
- Wiltold Owski as Man watching TV
- Krzysztof Płotka as Man watching TV
- Tomek Głowacki Man watching TV
- Keith Byrne as Guy in Piano Shop

== Production ==
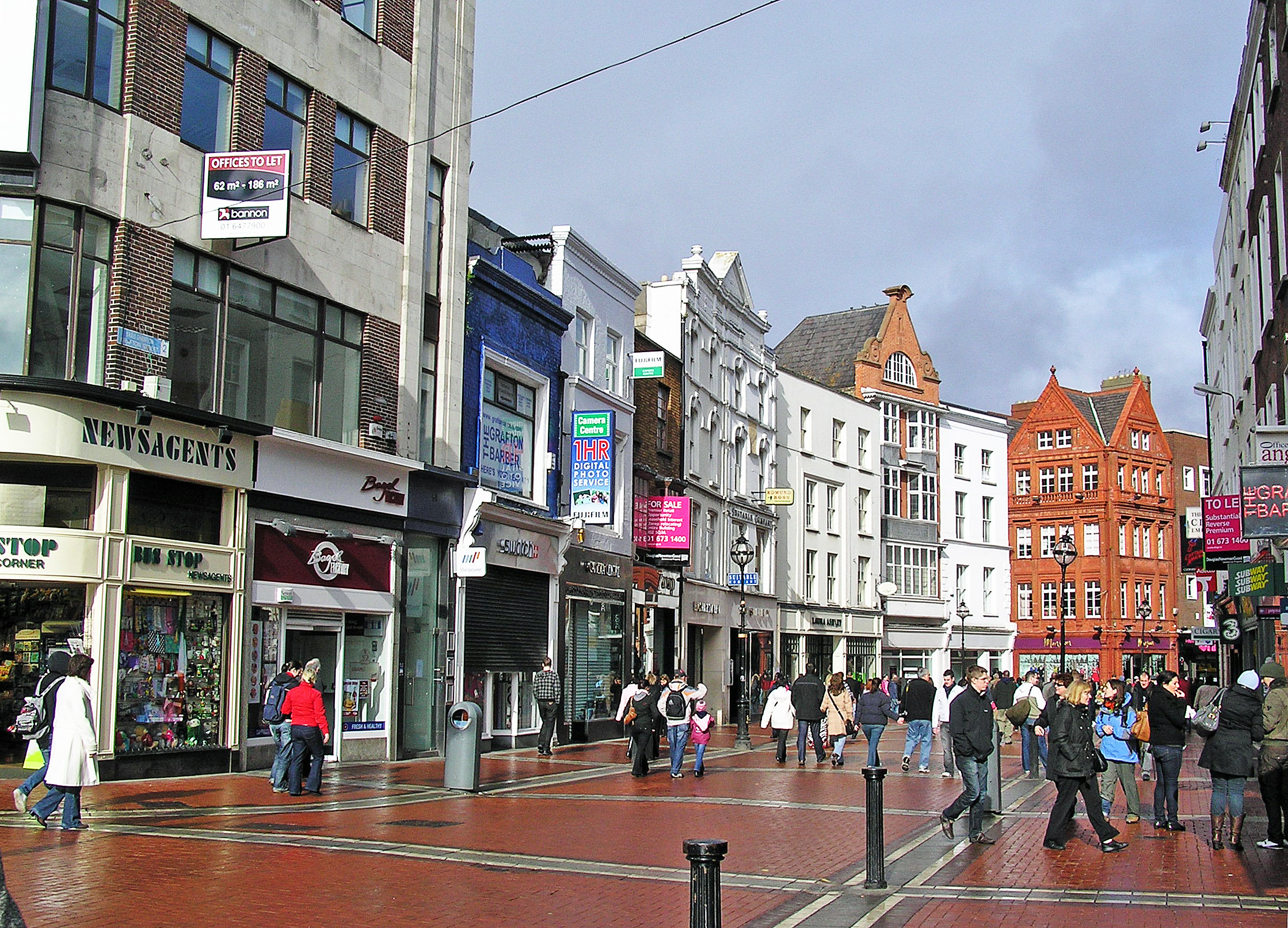
Hansard's busking scenes were filmed on Grafton Street.

The two leads, Hansard and Irglová, are professional musicians. Director Carney, former bassist for Hansard's band the Frames, had asked a long-time friend to share busker anecdotes and compose songs for the film, but originally intended the male lead to be played by actor Cillian Murphy, who was an almost-signed rock musician before turning to acting. Murphy was also going to be one of the film's producers, but reportedly did not like the prospect of acting opposite non-actor Irglová, who was then 17 years old. Murphy also believed he did not have the vocal capabilities to belt out Hansard's octave-leaping songs, so he pulled out, as did the film's other producers, also withdrawing their financial support. Carney then turned to songwriter Hansard, who had done only one acting job before, a supporting role as guitarist Outspan Foster in the 1991 ensemble film The Commitments, the story of a Dublin soul music cover band. Initially, Hansard was reluctant, fearing that he wouldn't be able to pull it off, but after stipulating that he had to be fully involved in the filmmaking process and that it be low-budget and intimate, he agreed.

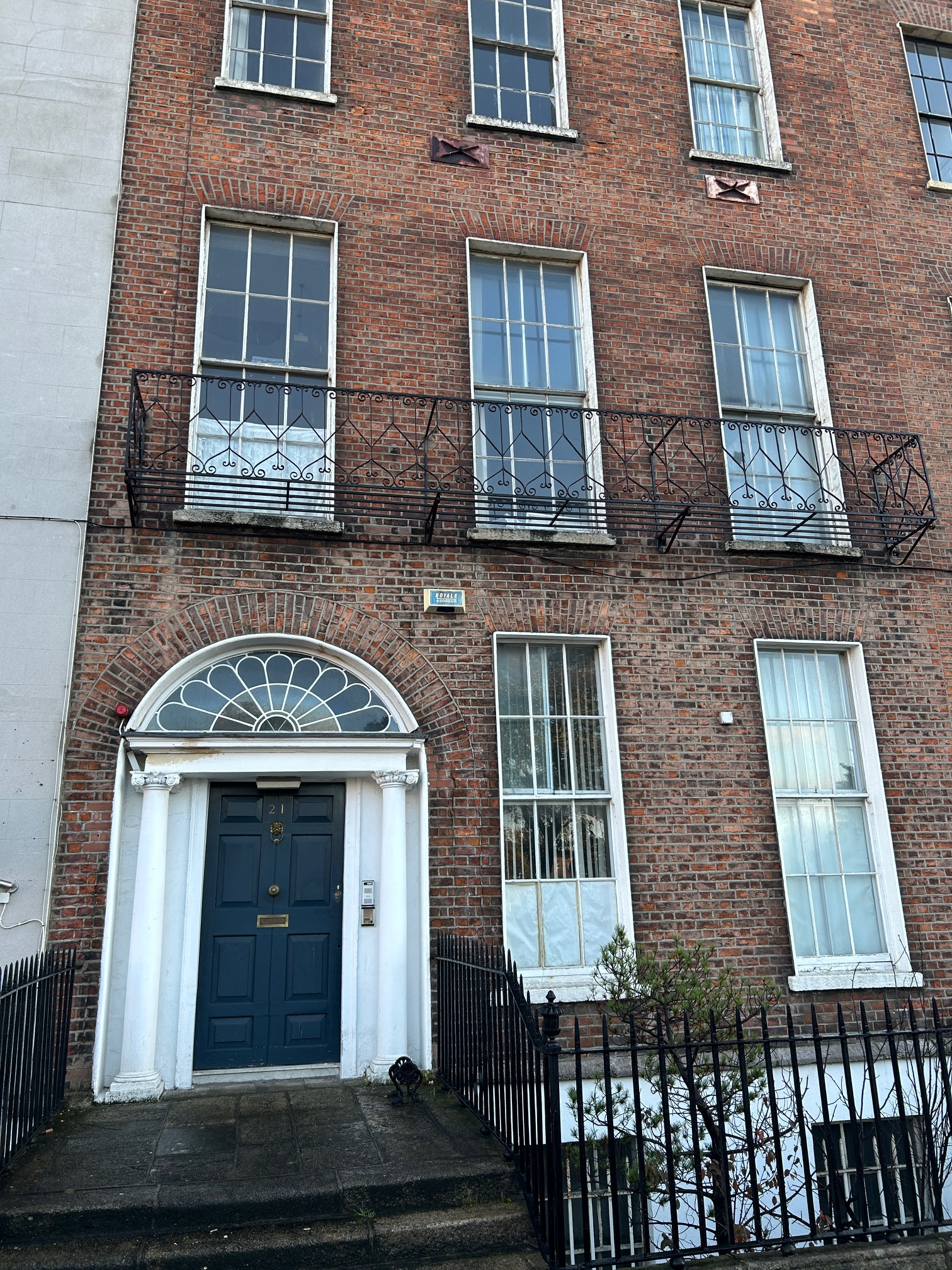
Site of the filming of Girl's apartment on Mountjoy Square.

The film was produced on a minimal budget, with about 75% of funding supplied by Bord Scannán na hÉireann (The Irish Film Board); as well, Carney committed some of his own money. The director gave his salary to the two stars, and promised a share of the proceeds to everyone if the film was a success. Filmed with a skeleton crew on a 17-day shoot, the filmmakers saved money by using natural light and shooting at friends' houses. The musical party scene was filmed in Hansard's own flat, with his personal friends playing the partygoers/musicians. His mother, Catherine Hansard, is briefly featured singing solo. The Dublin street scenes were recorded without permits, and with a long lens so that many passersby didn't realise that a film was being made. The long lens also helped the non-professional actors relax and forget about the camera, and some of the dialogue was improvised.

The unrequited ending of the film was an element of the script that stayed consistent throughout production. Said Hansard, "A lot of films let themselves down really badly by wrapping everything up in the last five minutes and giving you a story that trails off lovely. And what happens with those films is that you enjoy them but you forget them, because the story didn't rip you. But some films pull you in, and then they leave you on edge. They end, and you’re left thinking about it. And that's really the power of cinema, the duty of cinema—to make you feel something." Hansard said ad-libbing produced the moment where Irglova's character tells the Guy in un-subtitled Czech, "No, I love you," but when it was shot, he didn't know what she'd said, just like his character.

During the shoot, Carney had predicted a romance between Hansard and Irglová, calling the two his "Bogart and Bacall." Hansard and Irglová did become a couple in real life, getting together while on a promotional tour across North America, and living together in Dublin, in Hansard's flat. Entertainment Weekly reported:

The chemistry between (the) two leads...was easy to produce during the January 2006 shoot in Dublin. "I had been falling in love with her for a long time, but I kept telling myself she's just a kid," said Hansard, 37, who had known his 19-year-old costar for six years prior. "There was definitely the feeling we were documenting something precious and private."

In 2009, Hansard indicated they were no longer a romantic couple. He said, "Of course, we fell into each other's arms. It was a very necessary part of our friendship but I think we both concluded that that wasn't what we really wanted to do. So we're not together now. We are just really good friends."

As a result of the film, Hansard and Irglová released music and toured together as The Swell Season.

Glen Hansard and Markéta Irglová reprised their roles in The Simpsons episode "In the Name of the Grandfather."

== Reception ==
=== Box office ===
A rough cut of the film was previewed on 15 July 2006 at the Galway Film Fleadh, but the film was subsequently turned down by several prestigious European film festivals. However, once finished, it secured spots at the 2007 Sundance Film Festival on 20 January 2007 and the Dublin Film Festival in February 2007, and received the audience awards at both events.

The film was first released on cinema in Ireland by Buena Vista International on 23 March 2007, followed by a limited release in the United States by Fox Searchlight Pictures on 16 May 2007. After its second weekend in release in the United States and Canada, the film topped the 23 May 2007 IndieWire box office chart with nearly $31,000 average per location. As of 28 March 2009, Once has grossed nearly $9.5 million in North America and over $20 million worldwide.

=== Accolades ===
After 2007's box office success and critical acclaim, the film won the Independent Spirit Award for Best Foreign Film. Steven Spielberg was quoted as saying, "a little movie called Once gave me enough inspiration to last the rest of the year." When informed of Spielberg's comments, director John Carney told Sky News, "in the end of the day, he's just a guy with a beard." At the time of that interview, Carney himself was also wearing a beard.

The song "Falling Slowly" won the 2007 Academy Award for Best Original Song. The nomination's eligibility for the Oscar was initially questioned, as versions of the song had been recorded on The Cost and The Swell Season albums and it was also included in the movie Beauty in Trouble (all released in 2006); those issues were resolved before the voting for the award took place. The AMPAS music committee members satisfied themselves that the song had indeed been written for the film and determined that, in the course of the film's protracted production, the composers had "played the song in some venues that were deemed inconsequential enough to not change the song’s eligibility."

Award	Category	Recipient(s) and nominee(s)	Result
80th Academy Awards	Best Original Song	Glen Hansard and Markéta Irglová for "Falling Slowly"	Won
Critics' Choice Awards	Best Song	Glen Hansard and Markéta Irglová for "Falling Slowly"	Won
13th Empire Awards	Best Soundtrack	Once	Nominated
50th Grammy Awards	Best Compilation Soundtrack Album for Motion Picture, Television or Other Visual Media	Glen Hansard and Markéta Irglová	Nominated
50th Grammy Awards	Best Song Written for Motion Picture, Television or Other Visual Media	Glen Hansard and Markéta Irglová for "Falling Slowly"	Nominated
23rd Independent Spirit Awards	Best Foreign Film	John Carney	Won
12th Satellite Awards	Best Original Song	Glen Hansard and Markéta Irglová for "If You Want Me"	Nominated

=== Critical response ===
Once received widespread acclaim from critics. Upon its March 2007 release in Ireland, RTÉ's Caroline Hennessy gave the film 4 out of 5 stars and termed it "an unexpected treasure". About the acting, this Irish reviewer commented, "Once has wonderfully natural performances from the two leads. Although musicians first and actors second, they acquit themselves well in both areas. Irglová, a largely unknown quantity alongside the well-known and either loved or loathed Hansard, is luminous." Michael Dwyer of The Irish Times gave the film the same rating, calling it "irresistibly appealing" and noting that "Carney makes the point – without ever labouring it – that his protagonists are living in a changing city where the economic boom has passed them by. His keen eye for authentic locations is ... evident".

Once won very high marks from US critics. On Rotten Tomatoes, it holds a 97% approval rating based on 159 reviews, with an average score of 8.30/10. The website's critical consensus states, "A charming, captivating tale of love and music, Once sets the standard for the modern musical. And with Dublin as its backdrop, Once is fun and fresh." On Metacritic, the film has a weighted average score of 88 out of 100 based on reviews from 33 critics, indicating "universal acclaim". In May, on Ebert & Roeper, both Richard Roeper and guest critic Michael Phillips of the Chicago Tribune gave enthusiastic reviews. Phillips called it, "the most charming thing I've seen all year", "the Brief Encounter for the 21st century", his favorite music film since 1984's Stop Making Sense and said, "It may well be the best music film of our generation". Roeper referred to the film's recording studio scene as "more inspirational and uplifting than almost any number of Dreamgirls or Chicago or any of those multi-zillion dollar musical showstopping films. In its own way, it will blow you away." Ebert gave the film four stars out of four, saying that he was "not at all surprised" that Philips had named it the best film of the year.

In late 2007, Amy Simmons of Time Out London wrote, "Carney’s highly charged, urban mise-en-scène with its blinking street lamps, vacant shops and dishevelled bed-sits provides ample poetic backdrop for the film’s lengthy tracking shots, epitomised in a sequence where the Girl walks to the corner shop in pyjamas and slippers while listening to one of the Guy’s songs on his personal stereo that he lent her. With outstanding performances from Hansard and newcomer Irglová, Carney has created a sublime, visual album of unassuming and self-assured eloquence." The Telegraph's Sukhdev Sandhu said, "Not since Before Sunset has a romantic film managed to be as touching, funny or as hard to forget as Once. Like Before Sunset, it never outstays its welcome, climaxing on a note of rare charm and unexpectedness."

The film appeared on many North American critics' top ten lists of the best films of 2007:

- 1st – Michael Phillips, The Chicago Tribune
- 1st – Nathan Rabin, The A.V. Club
- 2nd – David Germain, Associated Press
- 2nd – Kevin Crust, Los Angeles Times
- 2nd – Kyle Smith, New York Post
- 2nd – Shawn Levy, The Oregonian
- 2nd – Roger Moore, The Orlando Sentinel
- 2nd – Robert Butler, Kansas City Star
- 2nd – Paste Magazine
- 3rd – Christy Lemire, Associated Press
- 3rd – Tasha Robinson, The A.V. Club
- 3rd – Andrew Gray, Tribune Chronicle
- 3rd – Sean Means, Salt Lake Tribune
- 4th – Keith Phipps, The A.V. Club
- 4th – Christopher Kelly, Star Telegram
- 5th – Ann Hornaday, The Washington Post
- 5th – Desson Thomson, The Washington Post
- 5th – Noel Murray, The A.V. Club
- 6th – Ella Taylor, LA Weekly
- 7th – Claudia Puig, USA Today
- 7th – Dana Stevens, Slate
- 7th – Scott Tobias, The A.V. Club
- 7th – Scott Mantz, Access Hollywood
- 7th – Craig Outhier, Orange County Register
- 8th – Liam Lacey and Rick Groen, The Globe and Mail
- 8th – Owen Gleiberman, Entertainment Weekly
- 8th – Stephanie Zacharek, Salon
- 9th – Joe Morgenstern, The Wall Street Journal
- 9th – Michael Rechtshaffen, The Hollywood Reporter
- 9th – Richard Roeper, At the Movies with Ebert & Roeper
- 9th – Kenneth Turan, Los Angeles Times
- 9th – Carina Chocano, Los Angeles Times
- 9th – James Verniere, Boston Herald
- 10th – Bob Mondello, NPR
- 10th – Peter Vonder Haar, Film Threat

In 2008, the film placed third on Entertainment Weekly's "25 Best Romantic Movies of the Past 25 Years".

== Home media ==
Once was released on DVD in the US on 18 December 2007, and in the UK on 25 February 2008, followed by a British Blu-ray release on 16 February 2009. Once was released on Blu-ray in the US as an Amazon exclusive on 1 April 2014.

== Soundtrack ==
The soundtrack album was released on 22 May 2007 in the United States and four days later in Ireland.

A collector's edition of the soundtrack was released on 4 December 2007 in the US with additional songs and a bonus DVD featuring live performances and interviews about the film. The additional songs were two previously unreleased Van Morrison covers: Hansard's "And the Healing Has Begun," and Hansard and Irglová's "Into the Mystic."

Different versions of several of the soundtrack's songs previously were released on The Frames' album The Cost and on Hansard and Irglová's The Swell Season, both released in 2006. An early version of the final track, "Say It to Me Now," originally appeared on The Frames' 1995 album Fitzcarraldo. "All the Way Down" first appeared on the self-titled album from musician collective The Cake Sale, with Gemma Hayes providing vocals. The song "Gold" was written by Irish singer-songwriter Fergus O'Farrell and performed by Interference.

The soundtrack album reached No. 20 on the Irish Albums Chart in its first week, peaking at No. 15 a few weeks later. Following the Oscar win, the album reached the top of the chart, while "Falling Slowly" reached a new peak of No. 2.

As of 11 July 2007, the album had sold 54,753 copies in the United States. The album reached No. 27 on the Billboard 200 and also reached No. 2 on the Soundtracks Chart and No. 4 on the Independent Chart.

== Stage adaptation ==
The film has been adapted for the stage as the musical Once. It first opened at the New York Theatre Workshop on 6 December 2011. The screenplay was adapted by Enda Walsh and the production directed by John Tiffany.

In February 2012, the musical transferred to Broadway's Bernard B. Jacobs Theatre. It began in previews on 28 February 2012 and opened on 18 March 2012. Directed by John Tiffany, the cast features Steve Kazee as Guy and Cristin Milioti as Girl with sets and costumes by Bob Crowley. The music is from the film with two additional songs, and the cast is also the orchestra. The musical opened up to generally positive reviews. Since its opening, Once has been named Best Musical by The Outer Critics' Circle, Drama League, The New York Drama Critics' Circle, and the Tony Awards.

The Broadway production of Once was nominated for a total of 11 Tony Awards, including Best Musical, Best Actor in a Musical (Steve Kazee), Best Actress in a Musical (Cristin Milioti), Best Featured Actress in a Musical (Elizabeth A. Davis) and Best Direction of a Musical. On 10 June 2012, it won eight Tony Awards including Best Musical, Best Direction of a Musical, Best Book of a Musical and Best Actor in a Musical.

== See also ==
- Busking
- Once (musical)
- Cinema of Ireland
- Musical films
