= Joe Doyle (musician) =

Irish bassist and backing singer

Joseph Doyle
- Born: Joseph Philip Doyle; 8 May 1977 (age 49); Ireland
- Genres: Folk; rock; folk rock; alternative rock; indie folk; indie rock
- Occupation: Musician
- Instruments: bass guitar; double bass; vocals
- Years active: 1993–present

Joe Doyle (born 8 May 1977) is the bassist and backing singer for Irish rock band The Frames and The Swell Season. He has been a member of The Frames since 1996, appearing on six albums to date. In addition to appearing on Frames albums, he has also played bass and contributed backing vocals to two Swell Season albums: the soundtrack to "Once" and "Strict Joy." He has toured as a member of the Swell Season, which also includes the late Glen Hansard (vocals/guitar), Markéta Irglová (vocals/piano), Graham Hopkins (drums/backing vocals), Rob Botchnik (lead guitar/backing vocals) and Colm Mac Con Iomaire (violin/backing vocals). Doyle originates from Allenwood, County Kildare, Ireland.

He left school in 1994, aged 16, to join Kilkenny band My Little Funhouse in 1993, alongside school friend Graham Hopkins. After signing a recording deal with Geffen Records, the band toured their debut album Standunder for about a year, mainly in the United States. Tours included support to Guns N' Roses and The Ramones amongst others. The band then lived in Los Angeles and recorded a second album for Geffen before imploding. Doyle then went on to join The Frames after bassist Graham Downey left the band.
