= Glen Hansard =

Irish musician (1970–2026)

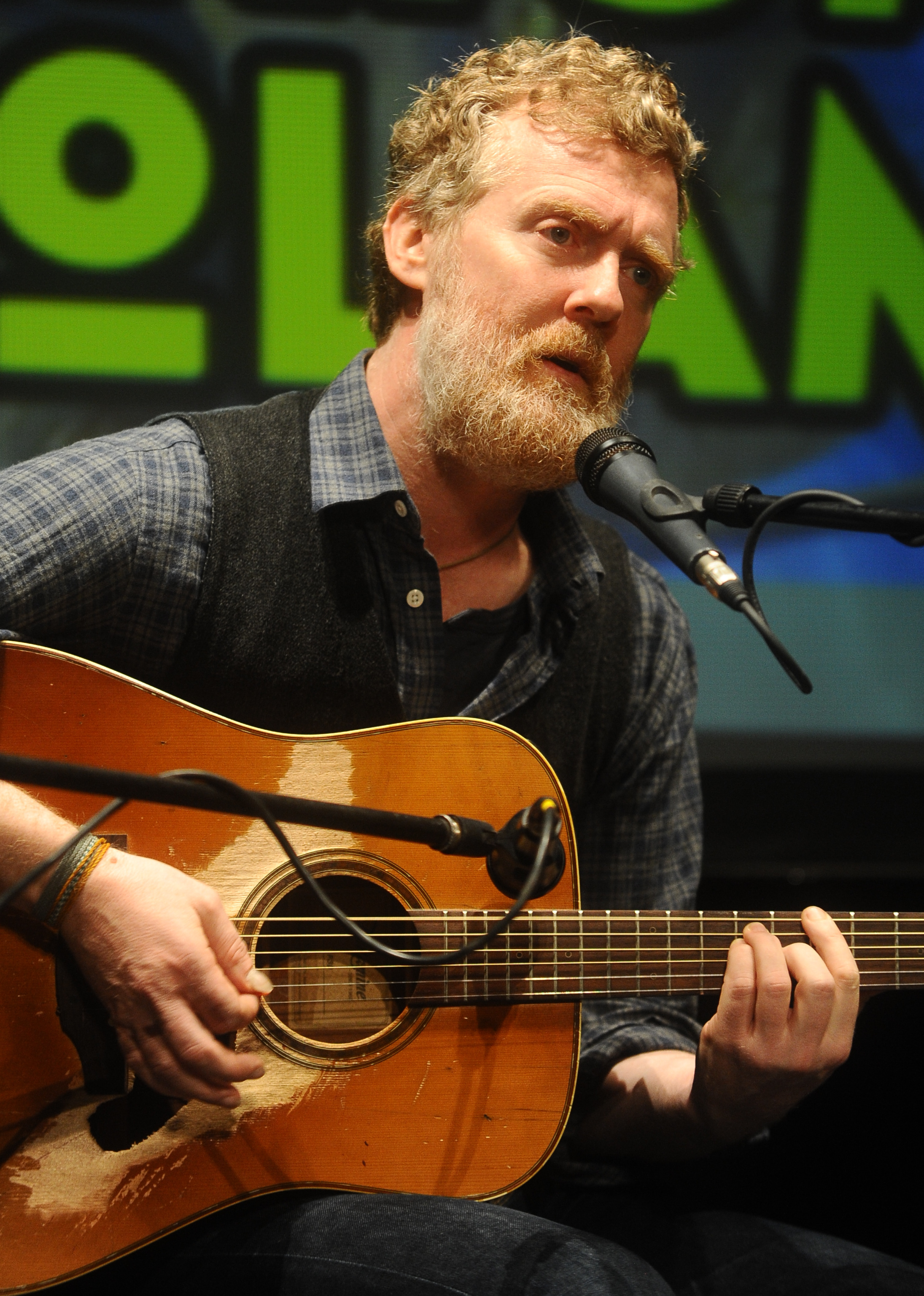
- Hansard in 2015
- Born: Glen James Hansard; 21 April 1970; Ballymun, Dublin, Ireland
- Died: 29 July 2026 (aged 56); Strawberry Beds, Dublin, Ireland
- Occupations: Singer-songwriter; musician
- Spouse: Maire Saaritsa (m. 2022)
- Partner: Markéta Irglová (2006–2009)
- Children: 1
- Musical career
- Genres: Folk; rock; folk rock; alternative rock; indie folk; indie rock
- Instruments: Guitar; piano; mandolin
- Years active: 1990–2026
- Labels: Plateau; Overcoat Recordings; Island
- Formerly of: The Swell Season; The Frames
- Website: glenhansard.com

Glen James Hansard (21 April 1970 – 29 July 2026) was an Irish musician. From Ballymun in northern Dublin, he busked from his teens. In 1990, he co-founded the Irish rock band the Frames, which he fronted. The band released six studio albums, four of which reached the top ten of the Irish Albums Chart. Hansard was also a member of the folk rock duo the Swell Season, founded in 2005, which released three albums. In 2012, he released his debut solo album, Rhythm and Repose. His second album, Didn't He Ramble (2015), was nominated for the Grammy Award for Best Folk Album.

Primarily a musician, Hansard also acted and wrote music for film. He appeared in the BAFTA-winning comedy-drama The Commitments (1991) and the Golden Globe–nominated romantic drama Cyrano (2021). Hansard starred in the musical drama Once (2007), which earned awards including the Academy Award for Best Original Song for "Falling Slowly", with Markéta Irglová. It was adapted into the stage musical Once.

Hansard married Finnish poet Maire Saaritsa in 2022; they had a son the same year, and lived in Celbridge near Dublin and in Helsinki. He died in a motorcycle accident at the Strawberry Beds on the outskirts of Dublin in July 2026 at the age of 56. Tributes were paid from the arts and political worlds, and a public wake was followed by a funeral at St Patrick's Cathedral, Dublin.

== Early life ==
Glen James Hansard was born on 21 April 1970 in Ballymun, Dublin, Ireland, the second of six children of James and Catherine Hansard (née Cahill). His father was a carpenter and a skilled fiddle player who performed with travelling showbands across Ireland during the 1930s and 1940s, but he also drank heavily and could be violent. Hansard chose the confirmation name Angus for himself, after Angus Young. He acquired a guitar from an uncle who was in prison, and taught himself to play.

His family later moved to another Northside, Dublin suburb, Killester. He had his primary education at Our Lady of Victories national school in Ballymun, and began secondary education at Ballymun Comprehensive School. He left school at 13 to start busking on local Dublin streets after his headmaster told him that, while he might not become a rock star, if he stuck at it he would "likely make a living from it".

== Career ==
=== 1990–2006: The Frames, Swell Season and Once ===
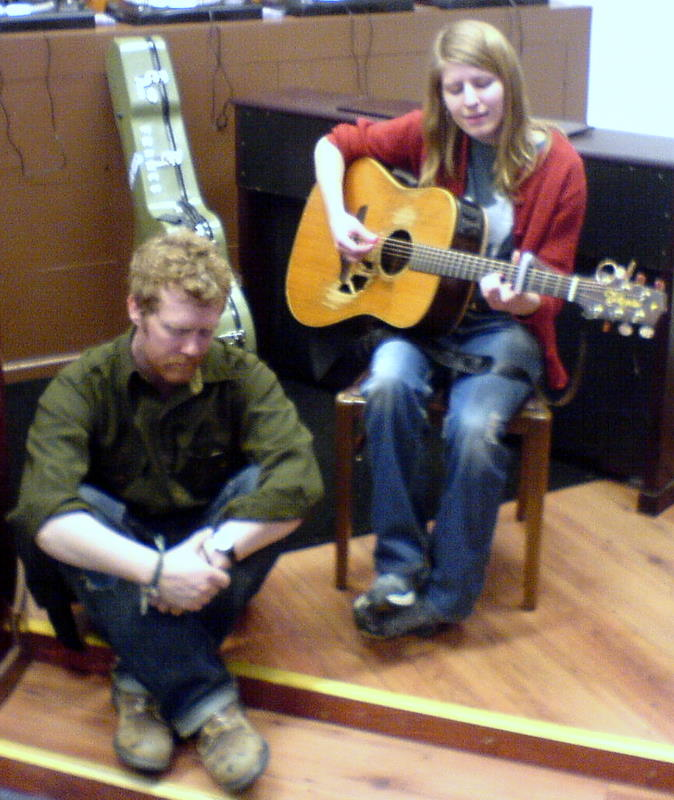
Hansard and Markéta Irglová playing at Cool Discs record store, Derry, Northern Ireland, April 2006

Hansard formed his own band, the Frames, in 1990 and the group played regularly in Ireland. He came to international attention as guitar player Outspan Foster in the 1991 Alan Parker film The Commitments, which was shot on location in Dublin and won four Bafta awards. He said that while he enjoyed the role, the fame "did a number" on him and some of his co-stars. In 2003, he presented the television programme Other Voices: Songs from a Room, which showcased Irish music talent on RTÉ.

In 2006, he released his first album without the Frames, The Swell Season, on Overcoat Recordings, in collaboration with the Czech singer and multi-instrumentalist Markéta Irglová, Marja Tuhkanen from Finland on violin and viola, and Bertrand Galen from France on cello.

Hansard was one of the stars of the Irish music‑drama film Once (2007), alongside Irglová; the pair also wrote original music for the film. The film had its United States premiere at the Sundance Film Festival in 2007 and received the festival's World Cinema Audience Award. Hansard and Irglová's song "Falling Slowly" won the 2008 Academy Award for Best Original Song, and the soundtrack received a Grammy Award nomination. Hansard said that far from being "full of light" after winning the award, he "went quite dark [and was] drinking too much". Bruce Springsteen told him he was no longer "the guy struggling against the world" and he should "embrace it and enjoy it."

=== 2007–2022: Collaborations, solo work, television and film work ===
Aside from his projects with the Frames and Irglová, Hansard took part as a member of the band on the 2006 Oxfam charity album The Cake Sale. He recorded several cover songs, both alone and with band member Colm Mac Con Iomaire, for the Today FM discs Even Better than the Real Thing. Songs that he recorded include Justin Timberlake's "Cry Me a River" on Even Better than the Real Thing Vol. 1 and Britney Spears's "Everytime" on Vol. 2.

Hansard recorded a version of Bob Dylan's "You Ain't Goin' Nowhere" for the film I'm Not There in 2007. In 2009, he said that he and Irglová were no longer romantically linked, and that they were now "good friends". He voiced a role in the episode ("In the Name of the Grandfather") of The Simpsons, as an Irish busker. A new album of original songs recorded as the Swell Season with Irglová, Strict Joy, was released on 27 October 2009 on the ANTI- record label.

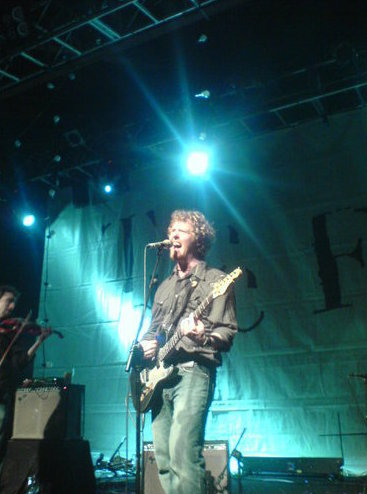
Hansard live at Vicar Street, Dublin, 31 December 2006

In the summer of 2011, he joined Eddie Vedder on his American solo tour in support of Vedder's solo album Ukulele Songs. He played a solo concert at the opening of the Metropolitan Museum of Art's Guitar Heroes exhibit in New York City in May 2011 and at the Cape Cinema on Cape Cod on 17 June. In September 2011, he played at Pearl Jam's 20th anniversary festival, "PJ20", at the Alpine Valley Theatre outside East Troy, Wisconsin. Hansard played several guitars including a recognisable battered Takamine NP15 acoustic guitar which he called "The Horse".

In a November 2011 interview in The Huffington Post with Irglová, it was revealed that Hansard was preparing a solo album and that a third release from The Swell Season was possible. This solo album was later revealed to be titled Rhythm and Repose.American Songwriter included Hansard's "Love Don't Leave Me Waiting" on its The Muse July Sampler. Another song of his featured in a film soundtrack is "This Gift", which appears in The Odd Life of Timothy Green.

Hansard sang "Take the Heartland" on the soundtrack for the 2012 film The Hunger Games. Another song he wrote, "Come Away to the Water", is featured on the soundtrack, but is covered by Maroon 5 and Rozzi Crane. Hansard can be found singing "Come Away to the Water" on the deluxe edition of Rhythm and Repose. He guest-starred in an episode of the TV series Parenthood, playing himself. In the episode "Trouble in Candyland", he performed "High Hope", a single from Rhythm and Repose. In 2015, Hansard and Lisa Hannigan recorded "On Love" for the soundtrack of the 2014 film Kahlil Gibran's The Prophet. Hansard sang Coyote at the Joni Mitchell 75th birthday concert Joni 75: A Birthday Celebration in Los Angeles in November 2018.

In October 2022, Hansard recorded "Take Heart", featuring Irglová, and Ukrainian refugees, in response to the Russian invasion of Ukraine.

=== Other concerts ===
In July 2013, he sang with Bruce Springsteen at Nowlan Park, Kilkenny, Ireland. In July 2015, Hansard performed several Irish classics with Ed Sheeran in Croke Park, Dublin. In 2022, Hansard toured with Eddie Vedder.

== Influences ==
Hansard remarked on his musical influences: "In my house, when I was a kid, there was the holy trinity, which was Leonard Cohen, Van Morrison, and Bob Dylan with Bob sitting centre." Hansard and the Frames toured as the support act for Dylan in Australia and New Zealand in August 2007, and Hansard often performed Morrison's songs in concert. Two songs, "Into the Mystic" and "And the Healing Has Begun", were included on the collector's edition of the soundtrack for Once.

== Personal life ==
While busking aged 16–18, Hansard lived with a friend in Ardclough, County Kildare, at the home of the artist Philippa Bayliss, his friend's mother. Bayliss paid for Hansard to take music lessons at Chatham Row School of Music (now the conservatoire of Technological University Dublin) in central Dublin.

Hansard and Markéta Irglová met in 2001, when she was 12 and he was 31, at a music festival organised by her parents in the Czech Republic. Irglová's father, a fan of Hansard's band the Frames, later invited Hansard to stay at the family home for three months to write songs. Hansard and Irglová began a romantic relationship in April 2007, during the promotional tour for Once. In August 2007, Hansard said of the relationship: "I think we fell in love a couple of years ago, but nothing happened until recently" and "I kept telling myself she's just a kid." The relationship ended after about two years.

Hansard lived in Chicago in the North Center neighbourhood from the late 1990s to the early 2000s, was an investor in Chicago's Thalia Hall music venue and quickly became part of Chicago's music scene. In 2008, he attended a four-week filmmaking workshop at the New York Film Academy.

From 2010 until his death, he led the annual Christmas Eve charity busk outside the Gaiety Theatre in Dublin, where musicians performed for crowds in aid of the Dublin Simon Community. Hansard also joined protests over Ireland's housing crisis, took part in a march marking three years since the Russian invasion of Ukraine, and attended the anti-austerity water charge demonstrations of 2014. By 2016, he was a member of the Home Sweet Home Group, a coalition of activists and homeless people. The group broke into Apollo House in Dublin and illegally occupied it. They later vacated the premises after a High Court ruling.

Hansard's partner, the Finnish poet Maire Saaritsa, gave birth to their first child, a boy, in October 2022, and they married in December 2022. They lived in both Celbridge, County Kildare, and in Saaritsa's home city, Helsinki.

In December 2023, Hansard performed a rendition of "Fairytale of New York" alongside Lisa O'Neill, backed by the Pogues, at Shane MacGowan's funeral service at St Mary's of the Rosary Catholic Church, Nenagh, County Tipperary, Ireland. They sang the roles of the 1987 original hit recording by MacGowan and Kirsty MacColl.

Hansard was raised as a Catholic but later joined the Hare Krishna movement after meeting some followers while busking. According to Colm Mac Con Iomaire, it was Mic Christopher who introduced them to the movement.

== Death ==
After performing at a traditional music session in The Wren's Nest pub in Chapelizod on 28 July 2026, Hansard died in a single-vehicle motorcycle crash in the Strawberry Beds area of Dublin in the early hours of 29 July, aged 56.

Books of condolence were opened at Dublin's Mansion House, Temple Bar and Naas, County Kildare on 30 July. A public wake was held on 3 August in the Baroque Chapel at the Irish Museum of Modern Art (IMMA) in Kilmainham, Dublin, and was attended by more than 11,000 people. Hansard's funeral was held the following day at St Patrick's Cathedral in Dublin, where the service was livestreamed online, with large screens set up outside the cathedral. Musical tributes were performed by Eddie Vedder, Lisa O'Neill, Markéta Irglová, and his older brother Gary, among others. Speakers included his wife and his younger brother Richard. The ceremony ended with a group rendition of Bob Dylan's "Forever Young" led by Liam O'Maonlaí of Hothouse Flowers and performed by Hansard's friends and collaborators. A private cremation service followed at Mount Jerome in Harold's Cross.

=== Tributes ===
Taoiseach Micheál Martin said that Hansard had made a "significant contribution to Ireland's cultural landscape". The President of Ireland, Catherine Connolly, said that he would be recalled as "one of Ireland's great singer-songwriters", while her predecessor, Michael D. Higgins, referred to him as "a wonderful musician and performer" with "a gift for storytelling". The Green Party said his death was "an immense loss to music". Victoria Mary Clarke, an Irish journalist and writer, said he was "the most compassionate and generous man". U2 frontman Bono remembered him as being "a smiling rascal if you needed him to be ... this most musical and mischievous archangel of Ballymun".

Bruce Springsteen commented "Here on E Street, we are heartbroken over the death of Glen Hansard", while Lin-Manuel Miranda said "Grateful for the music we got. Greedy for more. ... Once in a lifetime songwriter. RIP Glen." Markéta Irglová sent her "deepest condolences" to his family saying, "May his love always surround you, his spirit guide and protect you, and may his light shine on throughout your days". Ronan Keating shared a final email from Sydney in February 2026 in which Hansard wrote "Love you brother" and suggested they meet there the following week; Keating said he did not reply before Hansard's death and that the meeting had not happened. Tributes were also paid by Bob Geldof, Ed Sheeran, Colm Mac Con Iomaire and multiple further musicians and show business figures, some crediting Hansard with inspiration in their own careers. Barack Obama also posted a tribute. A memorial took place at the Luke Kelly statue near Grafton Street, where a crowd gathered while musicians performed songs associated with Hansard.

== Discography ==
=== Solo ===
==== Studio albums ====
List of albums, with selected chart positions and sales
Title	Details	Peak chart positions								Sales
Title	Details	IRE	AUT	BEL	GER	NLD	SWI	UK	US	Sales
Rhythm and Repose	Release date: 19 June 2012; Label: Anti-	3	21	111	71	37	40	133	21	US: 77,000
Didn't He Ramble	Release date: 18 September 2015; Label: Anti-	3	24	42	47	14	31	144	92	
Between Two Shores	Release date: 19 January 2018; Label: Anti-	20	10	18	16	30	19	—	—	
This Wild Willing	Release date: 12 April 2019; Label: Anti-	23	47	45	27	30	27	—	—	
All That Was East Is West of Me Now	Release date: 20 October 2023; Label: Anti-	—	46	168	52	59	—	—	—	

==== EPs ====
- Drive All Night (2013)
- It Was Triumph We Once Proposed...Songs of Jason Molina (2015)
- A Season on the Line (2016)

==== Singles ====
- "Winning Streak" (2015)
- "Lowly Deserter" (2015)
- "Cold Comfort" (2020)

=== The Frames ===
- Another Love Song (1991)
- Fitzcarraldo (1995)
- Dance the Devil (1999)
- For the Birds (2001)
- Breadcrumb Trail (2002)
- Set List (2003)
- Burn the Maps (2004)
- The Cost (2006)
- Longitude (2015)

=== The Swell Season ===
- The Swell Season (2006)
- Once: Music from the Motion Picture (2007)
- Strict Joy (2009)
- Forward (2025)

== Films and television ==
- The Commitments (1991)
- Once (2007)
- The Simpsons (2009) episode: "In the Name of the Grandfather"
- Ballymun Lullaby (2011) documentary
- The Swell Season (2011)
- Parenthood (2012 episode: "Trouble in Candyland")
- In the Deep Shade (2013 documentary, with the Irish band the Frames)
- Live on Letterman (Concert webcast, 12 December 2013)
- Jimmy Kimmel Live! (2023, episode: 3 October) musical guest

== Awards and nominations ==
Year	Award	Category	Nominated work	Result	Ref.
2007	Academy Awards	Best Original Song	"Falling Slowly" (from Once)	Won	
2007	Central Ohio Film Critics Association Awards	Best Score	Once	Won	
2007	Chicago Film Critics Association Awards	Best Original Score	Once	Won	
2007	Chicago Film Critics Association Awards	Most Promising Performer	Once	Nominated	
2007	Critics' Choice Movie Awards	Best Song	"Falling Slowly" (from Once)	Won	
2012	Drama Desk Awards	Outstanding Lyrics	Once	Won	
2012	Drama Desk Awards	Outstanding Music	Once	Nominated	
2007	Evening Standard British Film Awards	Best Film Score	Once	Nominated	
2007	Florida Film Critics Circle Awards	Best Original Songs	Once	Won	
2007	Gold Derby Film Awards	Original Song	"Falling Slowly" (from Once)	Won	
1991	Grammy Awards	Best Pop Performance by a Duo or Group with Vocals	The Commitments (Original Motion Picture Soundtrack)	Nominated	
2007	Grammy Awards	Best Compilation Soundtrack for Visual Media	Once	Nominated	
2007	Grammy Awards	Best Song Written for a Motion Picture, Television or Other Visual Media	"Falling Slowly" (from Once)	Nominated	
2015	Grammy Awards	Best Folk Album	Didn't He Ramble	Nominated	
2021	Guild of Music Supervisors Awards	Best Song Written and/or Recorded for a Film	"My Father's Daughter" (from Flag Day)	Nominated	
2021	Hollywood Music in Media Awards	Best Original Song – Feature Film	"My Father's Daughter" (from Flag Day)	Nominated	
2021	Hollywood Music in Media Awards	Original Song – Onscreen Performance	"Whenever I Fall" (from Cyrano)	Nominated	
2009	Houston Film Critics Society	Best Original Score	Once	Nominated	
2009	Houston Film Critics Society	Best Original Song	"Falling Slowly" (from Once)	Won	
2009	Houston Film Critics Society	Best Original Song	"If You Want Me" (from Once)	Nominated	
2006	IFTA Film & Drama Awards	Best Music in Film	Once	Nominated	
2014	Laurence Olivier Awards	Outstanding Achievement in Music	Once	Won	
2007	Los Angeles Film Critics Association Awards	Best Music Score	Once	Won	
2007	Online Film & Television Association Awards	Best Breakthrough Performance: Male	Once	Nominated	
2007	Online Film & Television Association Awards	Best Original Song	"Falling Slowly" (from Once)	Won	
2007	Online Film Critics Society	Best Original Score	Once	Nominated	
2007	Online Film Critics Society	Breakthrough Performer	Once	Nominated	
2007	Phoenix Film Critics Society Awards	Best Original Song	"Falling Slowly" (from Once)	Won	
2007	Satellite Awards	Best Original Song	"If You Want Me" (from Once)	Nominated	
2007	St. Louis Film Critics Association Awards	Best Score	Once	Nominated	
2007	World Soundtrack Awards	Best Original Song Written for a Film	"Falling Slowly" (from Once)	Nominated	

== See also ==
- The Stars Are Underground, a 24-minute film documenting the underground music scene in Dublin (1996)
