= The Swell Season =

Folk-rock music duo

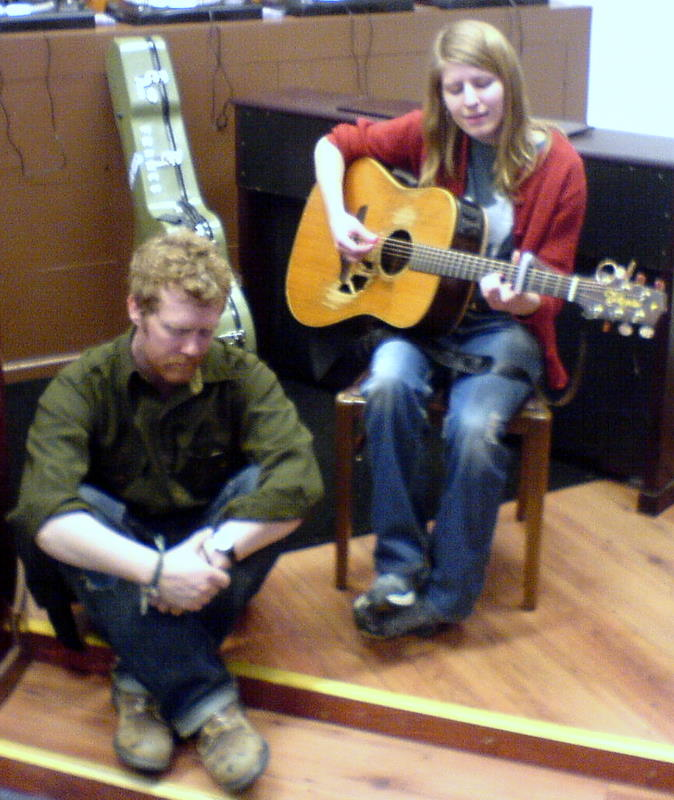
- Hansard and Irglová performing in Derry, Northern Ireland in April 2006

Background information
- Also known as: Glen Hansard and Markéta Irglová of The Swell Season
- Origin: Dublin, Ireland
- Genres: Indie folk; folk rock
- Years active: 2006–2026
- Labels: Plateau, ANTI-, Spunk, Sony Music
- Members: Glen Hansard; Markéta Irglová
- Website: www.theswellseason.com

The Swell Season was a folk rock duo formed by Irish musician Glen Hansard and Czech singer and pianist Markéta Irglová. "The Swell Season" name is derived from Hansard's favourite novel by Josef Škvorecký from 1975, of the same title. Their self-titled debut album was released in 2006.

The duo rose to prominence following the success of the 2007 film Once, directed by John Carney, in which the pair starred depicting a dramatised version of their own musical pairing. Their song "Falling Slowly" from the film's soundtrack won Best Original Song at the 80th Academy Awards. They increasingly referred to themselves as "The Swell Season" in promotion of their performances until it became the formal name of their collaboration in 2008; however, they continued to use their separate names when they contributed their cover of Bob Dylan's "You Ain't Goin' Nowhere" to the 2007 soundtrack of I'm Not There. In July 2026, Hansard died at the age of 56 following a motorbike crash.

== History ==
Production on their self-titled studio album began after Hansard and Irglová were approached by the Czech film director Jan Hřebejk while touring in the Czech Republic, and were asked by him to record songs for his 2006 film Beauty in Trouble. It was the first album that Hansard, the singer for The Frames, had released independently of his band.

The tracks "Falling Slowly" and "When Your Mind's Made Up" from their debut album, also appeared on The Frames' album The Cost. These two tracks, along with "Lies" and "Leave" also from the debut album, all appear on the Once film soundtrack.

Hansard and Irglová parodied their roles from Once in The Simpsons 2009 episode, "In the Name of the Grandfather".

Their second album, Strict Joy, was released on 27 October 2009, in the United States. Three singles from the album were released: "In These Arms", "Low Rising", and "Feeling the Pull".

Spin Magazine's review of Strict Joy gave the album 4 out of 5 stars. It stated "If Glen Hansard's and Markéta Irglová's roles in the hit Irish indie film Once unintentionally wove the tale of their real-life falling in love, their second album as the Swell Season weaves the story of their falling out of it."

In August 2010, The Swell Season covered Neutral Milk Hotel's "Two-Headed Boy" for The A.V. Club.

At a concert on 19 August 2010 at the Mountain Winery, Saratoga, a concert attendee leapt to his death from the roof of the venue onto the stage. The death was deemed a suicide. The band provided and paid for group counselling sessions for concert attendees who witnessed the event.

From 2007 to 2010, a documentary film was made about Irglova and Hansard called The Swell Season. The documentary premiered at the Tribeca Film Festival in June 2011, and received positive reviews.

In a December 2011 interview in the Huffington Post with Irglová, she revealed that the Swell Season would probably release a third album when Hansard finished with other commitments; however, the duo quietly went on hiatus.

On 10 and 11 January 2015, The Swell Season reunited for two concerts at Sejong Center to celebrate the re-release of Once in South Korea.

In 2021, Hansard confirmed to Variety that The Swell Season would be playing six dates in the U.S. in 2022. Seventeen further dates were announced for 2023. Also in 2023, they recorded a number of new songs in Markéta's home studio in Iceland, with one of the songs, titled "The Answer is Yes", released the same year.

On 18 March 2025, they released the song "People We Used to Be" along with a fan community called The Hoover Repair Club. They released a second single "Stuck in Reverse" on 23 April 2025. The two singles were featured on their new album titled Forward, which was released on 11 July 2025.

On 29 July 2026, Hansard died in a motorbike crash in Lucan, Dublin at age 56.

== Discography ==
=== Albums ===
List of albums, with selected chart positions
Title	Album details	Peak chart positions			
Title	Album details	IRE	AUS	CAN	US
The Swell Season	Released: April 2006; Label: Overcoat Recordings	—	—	—	—
Strict Joy	Released: October 2009; Label: Plateau	19	88	30	15
Forward	Released: July 2025; Label: Masterkey Sounds, Plateau	—	—	—	—
"—" denotes a recording that did not chart or was not released in that territory.

=== Singles ===
- "Falling Slowly" (2007)
- "When Your Mind's Made Up" (2007)
- "Falling Slowly" (2008, re-release, number 61 Billboard Hot 100)
- "Into the Mystic" (2008, part of "Before the Goldrush", the Teach For America Covers Project)
- "In These Arms" (2009)
- "Low Rising" (2009)
- "Feeling the Pull" (2010)
- "The Answer is Yes" (2023)
- "People We Used to Be" (2025)
- "Stuck in Reverse" (2025)
