= Burn the Maps =

Studio album by the Frames
- Released: 17 September 2004
- Recorded: Black Box, France; Electrical Audio, Chicago, Illinois; Joe's House
- Genre: Rock
- Length: 56:30
- Label: Plateau

The Frames chronology
Set List (2003)	Burn the Maps (2004)	The Cost (2006)

Professional ratings
Review scores
Source	Rating
AllMusic	4/5 stars
The Austin Chronicle	4/5 stars
Billboard	8/10 stars
The New York Times	(not rated)
Pitchfork	4.7/10
Planet Sound	7/10
Stylus Magazine	B+

Burn the Maps is the fifth studio album by the Frames, released in Ireland on Plateau Records on 17 September 2004 and worldwide on Anti- Records on 8 February 2005.

This was their first studio album to go to No. 1 in the Irish Album Charts. The songs "Fake", "Finally" & "Sideways Down" became their highest charting hits, reaching 4, 6, and 10 respectively.

== Track listing ==
1. "Happy"
2. "Finally"
3. "Dream Awake"
4. "A Caution to the Birds"
5. "Trying"
6. "Fake"
7. "Sideways Down"
8. "Underglass"
9. "Ship Caught in the Bay"
10. "Keepsake"
11. "Suffer in Silence"
12. "Locusts"

The song "Dream Awake" was featured in the NBC drama series Life at the end of series premiere and "Finally" is featured at the end of episode 11 of the first season, "Fill It Up".

== Chart positions ==
Chart (2004)	Peak position
Belgian Albums (Ultratop Flanders)	85
Irish Albums (IRMA)	1
Dutch Albums (Album Top 100)	54
