= Colm Mac Con Iomaire =

Irish musician and composer

Colm Mac Con Iomaire (pronounced [ˈkɔl̪ˠəmˠ mˠək ˌkɔnˠ ˈʊmˠəɾʲə]) is an Irish composer and musician from Blackrock, Dublin, Ireland, who plays keyboards, violin and sings with The Frames.

He is the son of Liam Mac Con Iomaire, a writer, journalist and broadcaster.

He attended school at Coláiste Eoin, an Irish Language secondary school (Meánscoil) in Co. Dublin. While there, in 1987, he was a founder member of the Irish folk group Kíla.

Mac Con Iomaire has been involved with The Frames since 1990 and his interest in the Irish Language led to The Frames's involvement in two Irish-language albums released for the Irish charity Concern during Seachtain na Gaeilge. This included an Irish-language version of the Burn the Maps track "Locusts" entitled "Lócáistí" on the SnaG 05 album in 2005 and a song called "Pian agus Ciúnas" on the 2006 album Ceol '06.

He has been a touring member of The Swell Season since 2006, and played violin on their 2008 album Strict Joy. He also played violin on David Gray's 1998 album White Ladder (on the track "Silver Lining"). Colm played violin for Damien Rice on his world-renowned album "O" in 2002 and helped finish his friend the late Mic Christopher's only solo album Skylarking, also in 2002.

Mac Con Iomaire's first solo album, The Hare's Corner (Cúinne an Ghiorria), was released in 2008. It was nominated for a 2009 Meteor Award for Best Traditional/Folk Album. His second solo album, And Now the Weather (Agus Anois an Aimsir), was released in April 2015. His third solo album, The River Holds Its Breath (Tost ar an Abhainn), was released in 2019.

He had a cameo role in the 1991 film The Commitments.
