= Gemma Hayes discography =

- Studio albums: 5
- Extended plays: 6
- Singles: 15
- B-sides: 19
- Music videos: 8

This is the discography of the Irish alternative rock singer-songwriter, Gemma Hayes.

Since first becoming musically active in 2001, Hayes has released six studio albums, one live album and six EPs.

== Albums ==
=== Studio albums ===
List of studio albums, with selected details and peak chart positions
Title	Details	Peak chart positions	
Title	Details	IRE	UK
Night on My Side	Released: 24 May 2002; Producer: Gemma Hayes, Dave Fridmann; Label: Source; Formats: CD, vinyl, download	8	52
The Roads Don't Love You	Released: 31 October 2005; Producer: David Odlum; Label: Source, Virgin EMI; Formats: CD, download	13	98
The Hollow of Morning	Released: 2 May 2008; Producer: David Odlum, Gemma Hayes; Label: ATC; Formats: CD, download	12	154
Let It Break	Released: 27 May 2011; Producers: David Odlum, Gemma Hayes; Label: GHM (Ireland/International), Fullfill Music via Universal Operations (International), Coast to Coast (Netherlands), Alive (Germany); Formats: CD, download, box set (limited edition)	11	—
Bones + Longing	Released: 17 November 2014; Producer: David Odlum, Gemma Hayes; Label: Chasing Dragons; Formats: CD, download, vinyl (limited edition), deluxe box set	38	—
Blind Faith	Released: 27 September 2024; Producer: David Odlum, Gemma Hayes; Label: Chasing Dragons; Formats: CD, download, vinyl (limited edition), deluxe box set	—	—

=== Live albums ===
List of live albums, with selected details
Title	Details
Night & Day	Released: 24 March 2014; Producer: Gemma Hayes; Label: Chasing Dragons, Hidden Masters; Format: Vinyl (limited release)

== Extended plays ==
List of EPs, with selected details and peak chart positions
Title	Details	Peak chart positions
Title	Details	IRE
4.35am	Released: 9 July 2001; Producer: Gemma Hayes, Dave Fridmann; Label: Source	37
Work to a Calm	Released: 12 November 2001; Producer: Gemma Hayes; Label: Source	—
Gemma Hayes Napster Sessions	Released: 17 April 2006; Label: Source	—
Gemma Hayes iTunes Festival 2008	Released: 11 August 2008; Producer: Gemma Hayes; Label: Gemma Hayes Music, ATC	—
Oliver	Released: 13 March 2009; Producer: Gemma Hayes and David Odlum; Label: Gemma Hayes Music	—
The Dylan EP (Roddy Hart & Gemma Hayes)	Released: 2011; Producer: Roddy Hart; Label: Vertical Records	—

== Singles ==
List of singles, with selected details and peak chart positions
Title	Year	Peak chart positions		Album
Title	Year	IRE	UK	Album
"Hanging Around"	2002	50	62	Night on My Side
"Let a Good Thing Go"	2002	—	54	Night on My Side
"Back of My Hand"	2002	—	—	Night on My Side
"Happy Sad"	2005	—	102	The Roads Don't Love You
"Undercover"	2006	38	60	The Roads Don't Love You
"Out of Our Hands"	2008	—	—	The Hollow of Morning
"Shock to My System"	2011	—	—	Let It Break
"Keep Running"	2011	—	—	Let It Break
"Wicked Game"	2012	—	—	Non-album single
"Chasing"	2014	—	—	Bones + Longing
"Making My Way Back"	2014	83	—	Bones + Longing
"Palomino"	2015	—	—	Bones + Longing
"High & Low"	2023	—	—	Blind Faith
"Feed the Flames"	2024	—	—	Blind Faith
"Hardwired"	2024	—	—	Blind Faith
"Another Love" (featuring Paul Noonan)	2024	—	—	Blind Faith

=== Promotional singles ===
- "Home" (2008)

== B-sides ==
- "Stop the Wheel" – Hanging Around
- "Parked" – Hanging Around
- "Hanging Around" (acoustic) – Let a Good Thing Go
- "Pieces of Glass" (radio session) – Let a Good Thing Go
- "Summers in Doubt" – Let a Good Thing Go
- "Ran for Miles" (home demo) – Let a Good Thing Go
- "Mama What's That Song" – Back of My Hand
- "Song for Julie" – Back of My Hand
- "My Friend Christian" – Back of My Hand
- "Let a Good Thing Go" (from Radio 1's Live Lounge) – Back of My Hand
- "Holy Place" – Happy Sad
- "Bad Day" – Happy Sad
- "Bless the Boy" – Undercover
- "Perfect Day" – Undercover
- "Something in My Way" (video – live at Abbey Road) – Undercover
- "Chasing" (Remix)
- "Palomino" (Instrumental)

== Guest appearances ==
- "Lay Lady Lay" – Bob Dylan cover by Magnet featuring Gemma Hayes
- "All the Way Down" – performed song written by Glen Hansard – The Cake Sale
- "It's a Shame" – Anti Atlas featuring Gemma Hayes
- "Reconsider Me" – performed by Gemma Hayes and Mundy (2010/2011); later appeared on Mundy's 2011 release Shuffle.
- "Jet", "Devastated", "Simple Life" and "All the Kids Go" – appeared on a collection of releases by Velvet Ear (2012).
- "A Way to Say Goodbye" – Tim Christensen features Gemma Hayes on Volume 1: Acoustic Covers.
- "Tanager Peak" (2013) – Halves featuring Gemma Hayes
- "Snowman" (2014) – Printer Clips featuring Gemma Hayes
- Gemma Hayes featured on Reza Dinally's debut album Depths of Montmartre (2014).
- "Counting Down the Days" – Above & Beyond featuring Gemma Hayes

== Music videos ==
- "Hanging Around" – Night on My Side
- "Let a Good Thing Go" – Night on My Side
- "Back of My Hand" – Night on My Side
- "Happy Sad" – The Roads Don't Love You
- "Home" – Hollow of Morning
- "Oliver" – Oliver EP
- "Keep Running" – Let It Break
- "Palomino" – Bones + Longing
- "High & Low" – Blind Faith
- "Feed the Flames" – Blind Faith
- "Hardwired" – Blind Faith
