= List of artists who have released Irish-language songs =

The following is a partial list of musical artists who have released songs in the Irish language.

- Aeons
- Altan
- Muireann Nic Amhlaoibh
- Anúna
- Autamata
- The Irish Roots Cafe house band
- Bell X1
- Wallis Bird
- Des Bishop
- Blink
- Luka Bloom
- Ross Breen
- Moya Brennan
- Kate Bush
- Paddy Casey
- The Chieftains
- Clannad
- Clann Zú
- The Coronas
- The Corrs
- Máirtín de Cógáin
- Liam Ó Maonlaí
- Delorentos
- Damien Dempsey
- Evoke
- Janet Devlin
- Tadhg Mac Dhonnagáin
- The Saw Doctors
- The Dubliners
- Enya
- Fontaines D.C.
- Órla Fallon
- The Fuchsia Band
- Dingle White Females
- Fiach
- The Hothouse Flowers
- The Frames
- Dave Geraghty
- Meanscoil Gharman
- Gavin Glass
- The Guggenheim Grotto
- Lisa Hannigan
- Mickey Harte
- Gemma Hayes
- Heathers
- IMLÉ
- Bevel Jenny
- Sandie Jones
- Susan McKeown
- Maria Doyle Kennedy
- Kíla
- KNEECAP
- Jack L
- Mary Jane Lamond
- Lir
- Ashley MacIsaac
- The Mongrels
- Morgan The Bouncer
- Van Morrison
- Morgan is Mosney
- Mundy
- Mairéad Ní Mhaonaigh
- Mike O'Laughlin
- Na Fíréin
- Nightnoise
- Sinéad O'Connor
- Mícheál Ó Domhnaill
- Declan O'Rourke
- Conor O'Tuama
- Q - OOH!
- The Pale
- Luan Parle
- Picturehouse
- Planxty
- Primordial
- Q (22)
- Relativity
- The Revs
- Roesy
- Rubberbandits
- The Backroom Bandits
- Pauline Scanlon
- Seneca
- Seo Linn
- Skara Brae
- Slide
- Rónán Ó Snodaigh
- Solas
- The Spikes
- John Spillane
- Claire Sproule
- The 4th State
- Sting
- Emmett Tinley
- Traic
- Tuath
- The 4 of Us
- The Walls
- The Frank and Walters
- The Waterboys
- Ian Whitty
- Ger Wolfe
- M-Opus

== See also ==
- Gaelic Revival - Irish language revival
- Gaelscoileanna Irish-medium education
- Gaelic broadcasting in Scotland
- List of Celtic-language media
