= Ceol (compilation series) =

Irish compilation album series

Ceol is an Irish compilation album series released annually between 2005 and 2018. Published as part of Seachtain na Gaeilge, the albums contain works in the Irish language by various Irish artists.

== Releases ==
=== Ceol '06 ===
Ceol '06

Compilation album by various artists
- Released: 3 March 2006
- Genre: Rock, pop
- Label: Seachtain na Gaeilge

Ceol 06 is a 26-track double album of songs in Irish, released in March 2006 to celebrate Seachtain na Gaeilge. It includes contributions from acts such as The Corrs and The Frames. The songs – many of them written in Irish, others translated from English – include Mundy's reinvention of his hit, "Mexico". All acts gave their time free of charge, with profits going to the charity Concern.

CD 1

Artist	Song
Mundy	Meicsiceo
The Saw Doctors	An Cailín Sin
The Frames	Pian Agus Ciúnas
The Frank and Walters	Nua Eabhrac
Kíla / Oki	Tóg É Go Bog É
The Revs	Tabhair Seans Dom
Emmett Tinley	Níos Gaire Do Shona
Autamata	Leabharmharcanna
Q (22)	Carol
Traic	Grá Mór
Ger Wolfe	Flaithis Dé
The Fuchsia Band	Grá Dá Raibh
Ian Whitty	Léine Chúfhiacaile

CD 2

Artist	Song
Luka Bloom	Cathair Mhór Chicago
The Corrs	Bríd Óg Ní Mháille
The Waterboys	Síocháin Iona
John Spillane	Éist Do Bhéal
Rónán Ó Snodaigh	Bhí Mé Ann
The Pale	Féileacán
Lisa Hannigan	Banríon Mo Chroí
Roesy	Ná Bí Faoi Scáth
The Mongrels	Reo/Crannlaoch
Susan McKeown agus Róisín Chambers	Dó Ín Dú
Conor O'Tuama	Chomh Fada Lem' Bheo
Ross Breen	Áilleacht
Morgan The Bouncer	Rapsódaí I gKay Hay (Cé hÍ Kay Hay Mix)

=== Ceol '07 ===
Ceol '07

Compilation album by various artists
- Released: March 2007
- Label: Seachtain na Gaeilge

Ceol '07 is a double album of songs in Irish, including contributions by Bell X1, Mundy, The Corrs, as Fiach and Claire Sproule. Profits for the albums sale went to Concern. The track listing included:

Artist	Song
Bell X1	Bladhm
Declan O'Rourke	Coscáin ar Bith
The Pale	Elizabeth Sna Bratóga!
Paddy Casey	Fágáil
Picturehouse	Sí
Gemma Hayes	Rith Mé Go Crích
Fiach	Is Aoibhne
The Frank and Walters	Tony Cochrane
John Spillane (22)	Suantraí
Pauline Scanlon	Reilig Chríost
The Fuchsia Band	Cad Fiú?
Q - OOH!	LA LA LA
Seneca	Chomh hÁlainn
Traic	An Scáil
The Hothouse Flowers	Sí Do Mhamó Í
Mundy	Lena Taobh
The 4 of Us	Bláth Fiáin
Jack L	Ó! Mo chroí
The Corrs	Buachaill ón Eirne
Damien Dempsey	Taobh Leis An Muir
Blink	Fan Socair
Kíla	Cabhraigí léi
Claire Sproule	Tuigeann tú mo Chroí
Mickey Harte	Go dTé tú Slán
Maria Doyle Kennedy	Réaltanna
Ger Wolfe	Brúscar Aráin
The Spikes	Fear Seó
The 4th State	Níl aon rud ann
Bevel Jenny	Gan scíth
Tadhg Mac Dhonnagáin	Féileacán
Morgan is Mosney	Bata romhair ag toitín

=== Ceol '08 ===
Ceol 08

Compilation album by various artists
- Released: 2008
- Genre: Rock, folk, world, country
- Label: Seachtain na Gaelige

Ceol '08 was a 17-track album which featured contributions by established acts such as the Delorentos, Mundy and the Coronas, alongside newer performers such as Luan Parle. Many of the songs are written in Irish; others are translated from English. All acts gave their time free of charge, with profits going to the charity Concern. The track listing included:

Artist	Song
Declan O'Rourke	Drochdomhan Mór Álainn
Wallis Bird	Comhaireamh chun Codladh
Mundy	Cailín na Gaillimhe (Galway Girl)
Fiach	Sea Táim
Delorentos	Bunús ar Gach Uile Ní
The Walls	Grian Gheal Lonrach
The Coronas	Taibhsí nó Laochra
Dave Geraghty	Cailéideascóp
Tadhg Cooke (22)	Cruthaítear Éad
Lir	"Wickerman"
Jack L	Oscail do Theorainn
Luan Parle	Taibhse
The Guggenheim Grotto	An Dragún
Gavin Glass	Mo Ghrá Geal
Dingle White Females	Fíll Fíll a Rún Ó
Slide	Ar Shiúl go Rinn Spáinneach
Des Bishop	Léimigí Thart (Jump Around)

=== Ceol '09 ===
Ceol '09

Compilation album by various artists
- Released: March 2009
- Genre: Rock, Pop
- Length: 51:02
- Language: Irish
- Label: Seachtain na Gaeilge
- Producer: Seachtain na Gaeilge

The 2009 release, titled Ceol '09, included songs by The Swell Season, Eddi Reader, Mick Flannery, Cathy Davey, Duke Special, Paddy Casey and Ham Sandwich. The first track, Grá Dom Leonadh, is a rerecording by Glen Hansard and Markéta Irglová of their 2007 Oscar-winning song Falling Slowly. The proceeds from sales of the album went to the children's charity Barnardo's. The track listing includes:

Artist	Song
The Swell Season	Grá Dom Leonadh
Eddi Reader	Foirfe
Mick Flannery	Nuachtáin An Lae Amárach
Camille O'Sullivan	Sna Bróga Seo
Saccade	Oinseach
Flach	Saol Faoin Bhfód
Cathy Davey	Reuben
Duke Special	Tochailt Uaighe Go Róluath
Noelie McDonnell	Trí Bhliana D'Aois
Paddy Casey	Seo Mo Chuid, Taispeáin Do Chuid
Ham Sandwich	Click Click Boom
Earthquake Hair	Silverize
Caruso	Trasna Na gCianta
Nell Bryden	Dara Huair A Ghrá
Ray Heffernan	Maireachtáil
John Spillane	An Poc Ar Buile

=== Ceol '10 ===
Ceol '10

Compilation album by various artists
- Released: March 2010
- Length: 1:02:02
- Language: Irish
- Label: Seachtain na Gaeilge
- Producer: Seachtain na Gaeilge

Ceol '10 was released during Seachtain na Gaeilge in March 2010. The album features songs in Irish by The Coronas, Bell X1, Gemma Hayes, Luan Parle, Mundy, The Saw Doctors, Kíla, Eddi Reader and The Swell Season. The album reached #3 in the Irish Compilation Album charts. All proceeds from sales of the CD went to the children's charity Barnardo's. The track listing includes:

Artist	Song
Eddi Reader	Foirfe
Bell X1	Bladhm
Mick Flannery	Nuachtáin An Lae Amárach
The Coronas	Taibhse Nó Laoch(ra)
The Devlins	Cóinleach Glas An Fhómhair
The Swell Season	Grá Dom Leonadh
Noelie McDonnell	Trí Bhliana D'aois
Luan Parle	Taibhse
Declan O'Rourke	Coscáin Ar Bith
Gemma Hayes	Rith Mé Go Crích
Mundy	Cailín Na Gaillimhe
Fiach	Is Aoibhne
The Walls	Grian Gheal Lonrach
The Saw Doctors	An Cailín Sin
Wallis Bird	Comhaireamh Chun Codladh
Kíla	Cabhraighí Leí
The Coronas	Éist A Ghrá
