= Let It Break =

Studio album by Gemma Hayes
- Released: 27 May 2011
- Recorded: August 2008 – March 2011
- Length: 47:57
- Label: GHM Music
- Producer: David Odlum

Gemma Hayes chronology
Oliver (2008)	Let It Break (2011)	Bones + Longing (2014)

Singles from Let It Break
- 1. "Shock to My System" Released: 13 May 2011; 2. "Keep Running" Released: 26 August 2011

Professional ratings
Review scores
Source	Rating
AllMusic	4/5 stars
BBC	(favourable)
Sunday Business Post	4/5 stars

Let It Break is the fourth studio album by Irish singer-songwriter Gemma Hayes. It was released in Ireland on 27 May 2011. The album was recorded in Westland Studios in Dublin, Ireland, Black Box Studios in Noyant La Gravoyère, France and mastered at Golden Mastering in Los Angeles.

== Background ==
Following the release of her third studio album, The Hollow of Morning in May 2008, Hayes confirmed she was working on some new material and aspired to release an acoustic album. During further promotional work and touring, Hayes confirmed that she had begun work on her fourth album in August 2008.

While recording for her fourth album, she produced tracks which later appeared on her EP Oliver. On 14 April 2009, it was announced on her Myspace blog that Hayes began to write newer material for the next album. On 3 September 2009, Gemma performed at the 2012 stage at the 2009 Århus Festival. Her set-list featured new songs "Waiting for You" and "Shock To My System". On 20 October 2009, Gemma confirmed through her Twitter page that she was recording new material in France in the Blackbox studios.

On 19 November 2009, Gemma began a short European tour with performances in Austria, Ireland, and the United Kingdom. During these tour dates, Gemma played new songs including 'Tokyo' (later "Keep Running"), "Waiting for You" and "Shock To My System". At her gig in Cork on 3 December, Hayes performed a cover of Kate Bush's "Cloudbusting". On 22 December 2009, Hayes released her cover of "Cloudbusting" available for free from her website. Hayes hinted on Irish music site Muzu TV that her yet-to-be titled fourth album would be released in September 2010. However, in October 2010, on Tom Dunne's radio show on Newstalk 106-108, Gemma Hayes said that her new album would not be released until early 2011.

In November 2010, Gemma featured in an interview with State.ie, she confirmed that the album would be released in mid-Spring 2011. During autumn 2010, Gemma Hayes toured with Ann Scott with further dates in Ireland. These dates were used to play tracks to see how fans would react to them. She launched her autumn tour in Cork City, Ireland where she performed some new tracks which included Noise, Hurricane and Beside Me.

On 13 February 2011, Gemma Hayes confirmed on RTÉ Radio 1's Today with Pat Kenny that her fourth studio album would be released in May 2011 and supported by a nationwide tour of Ireland. It was later confirmed on her website that the fourth album is due for May release, with a single due mid-Spring as recording in Ireland and France nears completion. Prior to the album's release, Hayes confirmed that 'Shock To My System' will appear on the album. On 15 March 2011, Gemma confirmed on her Twitter account that a track called "Noise" would be featured on the album. Hayes later confirmed that album artwork and track listing was completed in early March and was revealed on her website in May 2011.

On 10 April 2011, Hayes announced on her website the title and release date for the album. She also confirmed her Irish tour dates.

During recording of her previous album, Gemma established her own label 'GH Music'. Hayes described self-financing and self-releasing the album as a daunting task; she would like to have some support from a record label for her next album release.

In April 2012, the album received a wider release outside Ireland when Fullfill Music and Universal Music Operations released it in Europe, North America, and Asia.

== Production ==
Production of the album was put on hold whilst Hayes began to work on the soundtrack for the 2010 indie-film Janie Jones, by writer/director David M. Rosenthal. Hayes contributed three songs to the soundtrack which also appear in the film these include Just a Game, Fight for Me and Hurricane. During the album Hayes also worked with Roddy Hart on a collection of Bob Dylan covers. The Roddy Hart & Gemma Hayes 'Dylan' EP will be released in June 2011. She also worked with Irish singer/songwriter Mundy and appears on the track 'Reconsider Me' from his 2011 release 'Shuffle'.

Let It Break is a slight departure from her previous releases. With a strong reliance upon synthesizers and the piano at times, she draws upon the style from My Bloody Valentine.

== Release ==
Let It Break was released in Ireland on 27 May 2011 both in CD and download formats. The album was made internationally available as a download on the same date through iTunes, Amazon and HMV.

=== International re-release ===
April 2012 saw a wider release of Let It Break, as the album was re-released throughout Europe and North America. The 2012 release featured a newer track listing and artwork. It also featured a limited edition box set featuring 2 CDs and 8 postcards in special packaging. The box set featured the 2012 edition of Let It Break along with her 2009 EP Oliver.

== Singles ==
The first single "Shock to My System" was released in early May 2011 in Ireland. The song was added to radio playlists in Ireland on the week beginning 25 April 2011. Initially, "Keep Running" (previously titled 'Tokyo') was scheduled to be the first single, though this was later released on 26 August 2011. "Keep Running" was used throughout her tour in 2010 and 2011 as a promo for the album's release cultural show Imeall on 21 April 2010. She regularly appeared on Irish television and radio performing both "Shock To My System" and "Keep Running". Hayes later confirmed that the track "Tokyo" was changed to "Keep Running" on the album, as the song began to change direction during its production and some of the lyrics may be interpreted as referencing the 2011 earthquake in Japan, though this was not the case.

The second single "Keep Running" was released on 26 August 2011 in Ireland. The single is complemented by a music video that was shot on location in Los Angeles in July 2011. The videos theme is based around homelessness, where Gemma Hayes appears as herself alongside US actor Jason Ritter.

Outside Ireland, both "Keep Running" and "Shock To My System" were released as promo singles across Europe in March 2012.

While no music video was produced for the first single release in Ireland with "Shock to My System". A music video for the next single "Keep Running" was shot in LA in July 2011, stills from the music video were put up on her website on 7 August. On 26 August 2011 "Keep Running" was released as the second single from the album along with the music video. The video is directed by Brinton Bryan.

== Nominations/awards ==
Album

- The album featured on the list as a possible contender for the Meteor Choice Music Prize for Best Album of the Year in 2011.

Video

- The music video for "Keep Running" was directed by Brinton Bryan. It was later nominated for Best Music Video at the LA International Underground Film Festival in December 2011.

== Track listings ==
All tracks written by Gemma Hayes unless noted

Irish edition track listing (2011)
No.	Title	Writer(s)	Length
1.	"Don't Let Them Cut Your Hair"		2:07
2.	"Keep Running"		4:39
3.	"All I Need"		4:17
4.	"Fire"		4:37
5.	"Brittle Winter"		3:30
6.	"Shock to My System"		4:22
7.	"To Be Beside You"	Hayes, Chris Seefried	4:19
8.	"Ruin"		4:58
9.	"Sorrow Be Gone"		2:29
10.	"That Sky Again"		2:09
11.	"There's Only Love"		6:06
12.	"Noise"		4:22

International track listing (2012)
No.	Title	Length
1.	"Don't Let Them Cut Your Hair"
2.	"There's Only Love"
3.	"Sorrow Be Gone"
4.	"Keep Running"
5.	"Ruin"
6.	"Shock to My System"
7.	"Brittle Winter"
8.	"That Sky Again"
9.	"All I Need"
10.	"To Be Beside You"
11.	"Waiting For You"
12.	"Fire"
13.	"Noise"

Track listing (limited Edition box set) with Oliver EP and Postcards (2012)
No.	Title	Length
1.	"Don't Let Them Cut Your Hair"
2.	"There's Only Love"
3.	"Sorrow Be Gone"
4.	"Keep Running"
5.	"Ruin"
6.	"Shock to My System"
7.	"Brittle Winter"
8.	"That Sky Again"
9.	"All I Need"
10.	"To Be Beside You"
11.	"Waiting for You"
12.	"Fire"
13.	"Noise"
14.	"Oliver"
15.	"Ghost"
16.	"These Days"
17.	"Half Light"
18.	"November"

== Charts ==
Chart (2011)	Peak position
Irish Albums (IRMA)	11

== Release history ==
Region	Date
Ireland	27 May 2011
Various	27 May 2011 (download only)
United Kingdom	9 April 2012
Germany/Austria	20 April 2012
US/Canada	17 April 2012
