= Rob Hope =

Rob Hope may refer to:

- Rob Hope (runner) (born 1974), British runner
- Rob Hope (singer) (born ?), Frontman of Irish band Senakah

== See also ==
- Robert Hope (disambiguation)
