= Night on My Side =

- European/Japanese cover

Studio album by Gemma Hayes
- Released: 24 May 2002
- Studios: Tarbox Road Studios, Buffalo, New York; Black Box Studios, France
- Genres: Alternative rock, indie rock, folk rock
- Length: 49:49
- Labels: Source [Europe] Toshiba-EMI [Japan] Astralwerks [USA]
- Producers: Gemma Hayes, Dave Fridmann and Dave Odlum

Gemma Hayes chronology
Work to a Calm EP (2001)	Night on My Side (2002)	The Roads Don't Love You (2005)

Alternative cover
- US/Canadian cover

Singles from Night on My Side
- 1. "Hanging Around" Released: 13 May 2002; 2. "Let a Good Thing Go" Released: 12 August 2002; 3. "Back of My Hand" Released: 30 September 2002

Professional ratings
Review scores
Source	Rating
AllMusic	3.5/5 stars
BBC	positive
Drowned in Sound	8/10
Entertainment.ie	4/5 stars
NME	3/5 stars

Night on My Side is the debut album by Irish singer-songwriter Gemma Hayes, first released by Source Records on 24 May 2002 in the Republic of Ireland, 27 May 2002 in the United Kingdom, and 10 July 2002 in Japan. The album's release in North America was delayed until 22 April 2003, where it was released by Astralwerks Records with a different track listing and album artwork.

The album was nominated for the 2002 Mercury Music Prize but lost out to Ms. Dynamite's A Little Deeper.

== Background ==
Following the release of two acclaimed EPs in 2001 (4.35am and Work to a Calm), Hayes returned to record her debut album at Tarbox Road Studios in New York City and Black Box Studios in France, with some of the original demos previously recorded in Dublin. The album was produced by Dave Fridmann and David Odlum. Hayes later forged a relationship with Odlum who continues to work with her to this day.

Night on My Side was released in Europe in May 2002. Upon its release, Hayes was compared to Joni Mitchell and Joan Baez. To coincide with the album's release, Hayes went on an extensive European tour, with dates across Ireland, the UK, France, Germany and the Netherlands. She would later go on to support Marianne Faithfull and Counting Crows on their European tours.

Hayes continued to appear on European radio performing live for RTÉ Radio, France Inter and BBC Radio. She made appearances on radio and television in Ireland and also made appearances on radio to perform on The Black Sessions for France Inter, and BBC Radio 1 Live Sessions in the UK.

By summer 2002, at the age of 24, her debut album was nominated for the 2002 Mercury Music Prize. Hayes later went on a tour of the US with Josh Ritter supporting her.

== Track listing ==
=== European version ===
All songs written by Gemma Hayes.

1. "Day One"
2. "Hanging Around"
3. "Back of My Hand"
4. "Over & Over"
5. "Let a Good Thing Go"
6. "Ran For Miles"
7. "What A Day"
8. "Tear In My Side"
9. "I Wanna Stay"
  - The hidden track "Dartmouth Square" appears at the end of "I Wanna Stay"
10. "Lucky One (Bird Of Cassadaga)"
11. "My God"
12. "Night On My Side"
  - "Pieces Of Glass" (hidden track)

=== LP version ===
All songs written by Gemma Hayes.

1. "Day One"
2. "Hanging Around"
3. "Back of My Hand"
4. "Over & Over"
5. "Let a Good Thing Go"
6. "Ran For Miles"
7. "What A Day"
8. "Tear In My Side"
9. "I Wanna Stay"
  - The hidden track "Dartmouth Square" appears at the end of "I Wanna Stay"
10. "Lucky One (Bird Of Cassadaga)"
11. "My God"
12. "Night On My Side"
  - "Pieces Of Glass" (hidden track)

=== French version ===
A special edition of Night on My Side was released in France by Source Records France it contains the original album plus an additional bonus CD.

1. "Day One"
2. "Hanging Around"
3. "Back of My Hand"
4. "Over & Over"
5. "Let a Good Thing Go"
6. "Ran For Miles"
7. "What A Day"
8. "Tear In My Side"
9. "I Wanna Stay"
  - The hidden track "Dartmouth Square" appears at the end of "I Wanna Stay"
10. "Lucky One (Bird Of Cassadaga)"
11. "My God"
12. "Night On My Side"
  - "Pieces Of Glass" (hidden track)
- Bonus CD
1. "Brightness"
2. "Hanging Around (acoustic version)"
3. "Summers in Doubt"
4. "Pieces of Glass (radio session version)"
5. "Let a Good Thing Go (video)"

=== Japanese version ===
The track listing for the Japanese release is different from the original European version.

1. "Day One"
2. "Hanging Around"
3. "Making Waves"
4. "Let a Good Thing Go"
5. "Back of My Hand"
6. "4:35AM"
7. "I worked myself into a calm"
8. "Ran For Miles"
9. "Tear In My Side"
10. "What A Day"
11. "I Wanna Stay"
  - The hidden track "Dartmouth Square" appears at the end of "I Wanna Stay"
12. "Lucky One (Bird Of Cassadaga)"
13. "My God"
14. "Night On My Side"
  - "Pieces Of Glass" (hidden track)
- "Hanging Around" (Video)

=== American version ===
The American release features a different cover and track listing, including songs from the 4.35am EP but omitting songs featured on the European release of the album:

1. "Hanging Around"
2. "Back of My Hand"
3. "Let a Good Thing Go"
4. "Tear in My Side"
5. "Work to a Calm"
6. "Lucky One"
7. "Making Waves"
8. "Ran for Miles"
9. "My God"
10. "4.35am"
11. "I Wanna Stay"
12. "Evening Sun"
13. "What A Day"
14. "Let A Good Thing Go" (Video)

== Charts ==
Chart (2002)	Peak position
Irish Album Chart	8
UK Album Chart	52

== Release history ==
Region	Date	Label
Ireland	24 May 2002	Source Records
UK	27 May 2002	Source Records UK
France	28 May 2002	Source Records France
Japan	10 July 2002	Toshiba-EMI
United States	22 April 2003	Astralwerks
