= High & Low (song) =

2023 single by Gemma Hayes

Single by Gemma Hayes
- Released: 23 June 2023
- Recorded: 2022
- Genre: Alternative
- Label: Chasing Dragons
- Songwriter: Gemma Hayes
- Producer: Dave Odlum

Gemma Hayes singles chronology
"Palomino" (2015)	"High & Low" (2023)	"Feed the Flames" (2024)

"High & Low" is a song written by Irish singer-songwriter Gemma Hayes and the first single release from her sixth studio album Blind Faith. The track was released on 23 June 2023.

== Background and release ==
The first single from Hayes' new album was expected to be released in September 2022. The original track was to be "A Reminder of Another". However, due to ongoing delays with production and recording of the album, the label and management decided to delay any release until June 2023. Further, the debut single was changed to "High & Low". The song was co-produced with Dave Odlum. It features Sam Killeen on electric guitar and Adam Marcello on drums.

Hayes stated the song is ultimately "about feeling disconnected—but desperately wanting to connect".

== Critical reception ==
Despite the nine year hiatus since Hayes's prior release, Jonathan Currinn stated that "High & Low" "was worth the wait" and referred to the song as an "amazing heartfelt ballad" that "empowers the feeling of yearning for a connection".

Claire O'Neill, writing for Hot Press, called the song "softly stunning [...] with rippling harmonies and a beckoning call beyond [...] complimented by the melding sounds of guitar, piano and ukulele".

When the Horn Blows said the song "is a beautifully accessible folk composition that immediately engages and transports through to its melodic, story-book lyrics and hypnotising strings." They further called Hayes "assured and emotionally transcendent" as she "exudes an air of sure-footedness and confidence, creating a compelling listening experience."

== Music video ==
The music video was directed by Allyn Quigley and filmed on location on a beach in Whiting Bay, Co. Waterford, Ireland.

Jonathan Currinn noted that the video's choreography "connects amazingly with the song", concluding that the video's "concept is beyond amazing". Similarly, Earmilk noted that the "contemplative music video [...] elevates the introspective nature of the track within cinematic visuals."
