= Chasing (song) =

Single by Gemma Hayes

from the album Bones + Longing
- Released: October 2014
- Recorded: 2013–2014
- Genre: Alternative
- Label: Chasing Dragons
- Songwriter(s): Gemma Hayes
- Producer(s): Dave Odlum

Gemma Hayes singles chronology
"Keep Running" (2011)	"Chasing" (2014)	"Making My Way Back" (2014)

"Chasing" is a song written by Irish singer-songwriter Gemma Hayes and is the first single release from her fifth studio album Bones + Longing.

== Background and release ==
The song was revealed as the first single release in September 2014. It was released to fans for free who supported her Pledge Music campaign on 9 October 2014 and became available in the iTunes Store in Ireland, UK, US and Canada as part of the albums pre-orders. On 9 October 2014 the full version of the single appeared on Beat's website. On 14 November 2014 a remixed version of the song was revealed through Clash Magazine.

The single was made available on 9 October 2014 in Ireland and it will be released worldwide on 15 December 2014.
