= American Wake (disambiguation) =

American Wake a 2004 album by The Elders.

American Wake may also refer to:

== Music ==
- American Wake (album), by Patrick Clifford
- American Wake, a 2004 album by The Elders
- "American Wake (The Nova Scotia Set)", part of the Riverdance stage show
- "American Wake," song by Black 47

== Other uses ==
- American Wake (book), a 1995 book by poet Greg Delanty
- American Wake (film), a 2004 film by Maureen Foley

== See also ==
- American Wake (ceremony), a send-off party thrown in Ireland when a loved one left the country
