= Happy Sad =

Happy Sad may refer to:

- Happy Sad (album), a 1969 album from singer-songwriter Tim Buckley
- "Happy Sad" (song), a 2005 song by Gemma Hayes
- The Happy Sad, a 2013 Rodney Evans film
- "Happy Sad", a 2018 single by Ocean Alley, from the album Chiaroscuro
- "Happy/Sad", a song from the musical The Addams Family
- "Happy & Sad", a 2018 song by Kacey Musgraves from Golden Hour
