= Galway Girl (Steve Earle song) =

2000 song by Steve Earle

"The Galway Girl"

Song by Steve Earle and Sharon Shannon

from the album Transcendental Blues
- Released: 2000
- Recorded: 2000
- Genre: Folk, Celtic
- Length: 3:05
- Songwriter: Steve Earle
- Producers: Jamie Bedford, Ray Kennedy

"Galway Girl" is a song written by American singer-songwriter Steve Earle and recorded with Irish musician Sharon Shannon; the title was originally "The Galway Girl". It was featured on Earle's 2000 album Transcendental Blues. "The Galway Girl" tells the semi-autobiographical story of the songwriter's reaction to a beautiful black-haired blue-eyed girl he meets in Galway, Ireland. Local references include Salthill and The Long Walk.

A cover version of the song by Mundy and Sharon Shannon reached number one and became the most downloaded song of 2008 in Ireland; it has gone on to become the eighth highest selling single in Irish chart history. The song has been the subject of numerous covers and live interpretations.

== Background ==
The song was written about Joyce Redmond; Redmond plays the bodhrán on Steve Earle's version of the song. Earle met Redmond in Galway. Redmond is from Howth, County Dublin.

== Certifications ==
Region	Certification	Certified units/sales
United Kingdom (BPI)	Silver	200,000^{‡}
^{‡} Sales+streaming figures based on certification alone.

== Cover versions ==
=== Mundy version ===
"The Galway Girl"

Single by Mundy and Sharon Shannon
- Released: April 2008
- Genre: Folk, Celtic
- Songwriter: Steve Earle

The Irish artist Mundy collaborated with Sharon Shannon on a cover of "Galway Girl", a track she had previously performed with Steve Earle. A studio version of the track reached number one on the Irish Singles Chart in April 2008 and remained there for five weeks. It was the biggest-selling download in Ireland in 2008 and was a winning nominee at the 2008 Meteor Awards. The song was the highest-selling single in Ireland for 2008.

Mundy also recorded an Irish language version of the track entitled "Cailín na Gaillimhe", for Ceol '08, an Irish language compilation record, which was released in 2008 to raise money for several Irish charities.

=== Other versions ===
(Year of release – artist / group – album)

- 2003: The Punters – Fisherman's Blues
- 2004: The Elders – The Best Crowd We Ever Had
- 2007: The Fenians – The Best of the Fenians: Couldn't Have Come at a Better Time
- 2008: The Langer's Ball – As I Roved Out
- 2009: Malachi Cush – The Galway Girl
- 2010: Mike Denver – The Essential Galway Boy Collection
- 2011: Celtic Thunder – Heritage (later re-recorded)
- 2012: Scythian – It's Not Too Late
- 2012: Rapalje – Clubs
- 2013: Johnny Logan – The Irish Connection 2
- 2013: Foster and Allen featuring Shayne Ward.
- 2013: The High Kings – Friends for Life
- 2015: Damien Leith featuring Sharon Shannon – Songs from Ireland
- 2015: Old Goats – A Rattling Pint
- 2017: Ritchie Remo, a Northern Ireland singer as "Galway Girls" as a mashup of this song and identically titled Ed Sheeran song "Galway Girl".
- 2020: Rocky Sullivan, Psy.D. – Hash It Out
- 2020: Fiddler's Green – 3 Cheers for 30 Years
- 2022: Tophouse - "The Irish EP"
- 2023: Josh Abbott Band w/ Shane Smith And The Saints – "The Galway Girl"

The comedian Stewart Lee references and performs the song in his 2009 Edinburgh Fringe show and also on his live DVD If You Prefer a Milder Comedian Please Ask for One, released on October 11, 2010.

== References in popular culture ==
The song is a key plot point in the 2007 film P.S. I Love You; Gerard Butler's character sings the song for Hilary Swank's character. Jeffrey Dean Morgan's character also sings the song to her.

The song is featured in the TV series Treme (in episode 9 of "What is New Orleans?", from season 2). It was performed by Steve Earle (in the role of Harley, a street musician) with Lucia Micarelli and Spider Stacy, of the Pogues, accompanying him on violin and pennywhistle.
