= The Elders =

The Elders may refer to:

- The Elders (band), a band from Missouri, US
  - The Elders (album)
- The Elders (organization), an international non-government organization

== See also ==
- Elder (disambiguation)
