= Night & Day (Gemma Hayes album) =

Studio album by Gemma Hayes
- Released: 24 March 2014
- Recorded: Dublin
- Genre: Alternative rock, indie rock, folk
- Label: Chasing Dragons Imprint
- Producer: Gemma Hayes

Gemma Hayes chronology
Let It Break (2011)	Night & Day (2014)	Bones + Longing (2014)

Night & Day is a live album by Irish singer-songwriter Gemma Hayes. It is a limited release available on vinyl.

== Release and recording ==
The vinyl was released in March 2014 and features ten unique live recordings taken from her live shows at Dublin's Olympia Theatre & Crawdaddy and London's St Giles-in-the-Fields recorded during 2012.

The vinyl release was part of her 2013-2014 Pledge Music campaign in support of her fifth studio album, Bones + Longing.

== Background ==
Following years of touring off the back of four albums and a number of EPs; on 21 November 2012 Gemma Hayes confirmed she planned to record her 9 December performance at Dublin's Olympia Theatre and planned to release the recordings. The initial plan was to release the album in early 2013 but this was shelved, as the artist decided to produce a covers EP. By 22 April 2013, Hayes confirmed through an email to fans she hoped to release a special limited vinyl featuring these live recordings. Each limited edition vinyl is numbered and signed by the artist. Hayes' fans were asked to submit any live performances they may have recorded during previous tours, with the possibility they could be used on the LP. On 16 August 2013, through her website it was confirmed Hayes had launched a Pledge Music campaign. She confirmed the limited vinyl release titled 'Night & Day' would help assist with the production of her fifth studio album. On 31 October 2013 the track listing for the album was revealed.

The album was released in March 2014.

== Format ==
The vinyl is limited edition and pressed based on demand with each copy hand-numbered and with a unique download code. The album was made available on 180gsm vinyl in a gatefold sleeve and comes with 2 x art prints.

== Track listing ==
All songs written by Gemma Hayes.
Side A - Day

1. "Back of My Hand"
2. "Ruin"
3. "All I Need"
4. "Happy Sad"
5. "Let It Good Thing Go"

Side B - Night

1. "Cloudbusting"
2. "4:35am"
3. "Waiting For You"
4. "Oliver"
5. "Out Of Our Hands"

Notes
Tracks 3 & 4 on Side B - Night, recorded at Crawdaddy in Dublin
Track 5 recorded at St Giles-in-the-Fields, London
All other tracks recorded at The Olympia Theatre, Dublin
