= Back of My Hand =

Back of My Hand may refer to:

- "Back of My Hand" (The Jags song), 1979
- "Back of My Hand" (Gemma Hayes song), 2002
- "Back of My Hand" (Rolling Stones song), 2005
