= Hardwire =

Hardwire or hardwired may refer to:

- Electrical wiring
- Hardwired control unit, a part of a computer's central processing unit
- In computer programming, a kludge to temporarily or quickly fix a problem
- Wired communication

In arts and entertainment:

- "Hardwire", a song by Metric, from the 2007 album Grow Up and Blow Away
- Hard Wired, a 1995 album by the band Front Line Assembly
- Hardwired, a book series by Walter Jon Williams, including the 1986 science fiction novel Hardwired
- Hardwired, a pre-release version of the 1994 video game Red Zone
- Hardwired (film), a 2009 action film
- Hardwired... to Self-Destruct, an album by Metallica, often referred to simply as Hardwired
  - "Hardwired" (Metallica song)
- "Hardwired" (Gemma Hayes song), 2024

== See also ==
- Hard coding, embedding software input or configuration data into source code
