= Racing the Tide =

Studio album by The Elders
- Released: 1 July 2006
- Studio: Rear Window Studios and Big Time Studios, Kansas City
- Genre: Celtic rock
- Length: 49:38
- Label: PubTone

Professional ratings
Review scores
Source	Rating
Allmusic	3.5/5 stars

Racing the Tide is the fourth studio album by The Elders, released in 2006.

== Track listing ==
1. "Send a Prayer" – 4:55
2. "Bad Irish Boy – 3:47
3. "Dear God" – 3:41
4. "Cousin Charlie" – 3:29
5. "Right with the World" – 3:26
6. "Racing the Tide" – 4:00
7. "Banshee Cry" – 4:46
8. "Gonna Take a Miracle" – 4:01
9. "Australia" – 3:45
10. "Story of a Fish" – 3:25
11. "Five Long Years" – 4:29
12. "Ever Be a Nation" – 5:20
13. "Saint Brendan Had a Boat" – 5:33
