= Live at the Gem =

Live album by The Elders
- Released: October 11, 2005
- Venue: Gem Theater
- Label: PubTone

Live at the Gem is The Elders' second live album recorded at a 2005 concert at The Gem Theater in Kansas City, Missouri. The concert was filmed and released on DVD and is occasionally broadcast on PBS affiliates. It was released on October 11, 2005.

== Track listing ==
1. "Michael's Ride" - 3:00
2. "Packy Go Home" - 6:39
3. "American Wake" - 4:34
4. "Moore Street Girls" - 5:10
5. "Love of the Century" - 6:15
6. "Turnpike" - 5:00
7. "Send a Prayer" - 5:35
8. "Haverty Brothers" - 3:44
9. "1849" - 5:46
10. "Brettski's Medley" - 7:15
11. "Men of Erin" - 3:59
12. "Buzz's Jig" - 4:42
13. "Fire In Hole" - 4:44
14. "Devil's Tongue" - 6:36
