= Blind Faith (Gemma Hayes album) =

Studio album by Gemma Hayes
- Released: 27 September 2024
- Recorded: Dublin and West Cork, Ireland
- Length: 36:35
- Label: Gemma Hayes Music; Townsend Music
- Producer: David Odlum; Gemma Hayes; Karl Odlum; Brian Casey

Gemma Hayes chronology
Bones + Longing (2014)	Blind Faith (2024)

Singles from Blind Faith
- 1. "High & Low" Released: 23 June 2023; 2. "Feed the Flames" Released: 25 January 2024; 3. "Hardwired" Released: 14 May 2024; 4. "Another Love" Released: August 2024; 5. "Central Hotel" Released: 16 April 2025

Blind Faith is the sixth studio album by Irish singer-songwriter Gemma Hayes. The album was released on 27 September 2024.

The album was recorded in Dublin and West Cork, Ireland.

== Background and development ==
Work commenced on the album with songwriting and demos taking place in West Cork, due to COVID-19 restrictions in Ireland, the production of the album was delayed, however when the opportunity arose the album continued to be produced between West Cork and Dublin in Ireland. The album is produced by long-term producer David Odlum, Karl Odlum and Brian Casey.

During the process of making the album musicians Sam Killeen and Adam Marcello were drafted in to assist with making the album. Longterm friends Ann Scott, Lisa Hannigan and Paul Noonan also assisted with vocals and songwriting.

== Release ==
The album was independently released through Gemma Hayes Music and Townsend Music on CD, limited edition cassette, standard edition vinyl, and two limited edition vinyls (marble sky blue and pink marble).

== Themes ==
The album contains lyrics about longing, loss, empowerment, freedom and repression.

== Artwork ==
On 22 July 2024, the artwork for the album was revealed. The artwork was produced by German artist Dirk Wüstenhagen.

== Critical reception ==
The album received widespread praise, with critics calling it one of Hayes' finest works. Montreal Rocks highlighted its "reflective and introspective" nature, blending soothing melodies with emotional depth. The Irish Times described it as a meditative, self-therapeutic album, rating it 4 out of 5 stars. Mojo hailed it as a career-defining record, also giving it 4 stars. The Irish Independent echoed these positive sentiments with a favourable review.

== Track listing ==
All tracks are written by Gemma Hayes, except where noted.

Blind Faith track listing
No.	Title	Length
1.	"Eye for an Eye"	4:19
2.	"Central Hotel"	4:32
3.	"Another Love" (featuring Paul Noonan)	3:45
4.	"Hardwired"	4:16
5.	"Feed the Flames" (co-written by Hayes and Lisa Hannigan)	3:27
6.	"High & Low"	3:53
7.	"The Break Didn't Heal Right"	4:17
8.	"Can't Kill a Hunger" (featuring Ann Scott)	3:54
9.	"Return of the Daughters"	4:12
Total length:		36:35

== Personnel ==
- Gemma Hayes – vocals, guitar, piano, arrangement, producer, programming, bassline programming, vocal arrangement, voice arrangement, cello
- David Odlum – producer, engineer, guitar, synth, beats, bass and vocals
- Karl Odlum – producer
- Ann Scott – vocals, backing vocals
- Paul Noonan – vocals, backing vocals
- Lisa Hannigan – songwriting, backing vocals
- Simon Long – photography
- Sam Killeen – guitars
- Adam Marcello – drums

== Charts ==
Chart performance for Blind Faith
Chart (2024)	Peak position
Irish Albums (IRMA)	8
Scottish Albums (OCC)	89
UK Album Downloads (OCC)	84
UK Americana Albums (OCC)	12
UK Independent Albums (OCC)	23

== Release history ==
Release history for Blind Faith
Region	Date	Distributing label
Ireland	27 September 2024	Gemma Hayes Music
United Kingdom	27 September 2024	Townsend Music
United States	27 September 2024	Secret Road
