= Undercover (song) =

Single by Gemma Hayes
- Released: 3 March 2006 Republic of Ireland
- Genre: Alternative
- Length: n/a
- Label: Source Records & EMI Ireland
- Songwriters: Gemma Hayes, Roger Joseph Manning, Jr., Jeff Trott
- Producers: Gemma Hayes, Joey Waronker

Gemma Hayes singles chronology
"Happy Sad" (2005)	"Undercover" (2006)	"Out Of Our Hands" (2008)

Undercover is the second single taken from the second album The Roads Don't Love You by Irish singer-songwriter Gemma Hayes, released in 2006 on the Source Records label.

== Background ==
This was the final single released under her Virgin EMI record deal. Following a reorganization of the label, Virgin EMI decided to limit the physical release of the single to Ireland, where it was distributed through EMI Ireland. Shortly after, Virgin EMI and Gemma Hayes parted ways.

== Live performance ==
Hayes performed the track on RTÉ One's Turbidy Tonight on 11 February 2006. She also performed the single on RTÉ 2's The Cafe.

She also performed the track at Abbey Road, which was later included in the interactive digital release.

== Track listing ==
=== CD 1 ===
All songs written by Gemma Hayes.

1. "Undercover"
2. "Perfect Day"

=== CD 2 (Enhanced CD) ===
1. "Undercover"
2. "Bless The Boy"
3. "Something in My Way (Live Acoustic Version – live at Abbey Rd)"
4. "Something in My Way (Live Acoustic Version – Video – live at Abbey Rd)"

=== 7" ===
1. "Undercover"
2. "Bless The Boy"

== Charts ==
Chart (2005)	Peak position
Irish Singles Chart	38
UK Singles Chart	60
