= Bob Hope (disambiguation) =

Bob Hope (1903–2003) was a British-born American iconic entertainer.

Bob Hope may also refer to:

- Bob Hope (Emmerdale), a character in Emmerdale, played by Tony Audenshaw
- MV Bob Hope, the lead vessel of the Bob Hope-class ships

== See also ==
- The Adventures of Bob Hope, a comic book series
- Bob Hope British Classic, a former European Tour golf tournament played from 1980 to 1991
- Bob Hope Chrysler Classic, a tournament of the PGA tour
- Bob Hope Humanitarian Award, an award given by the Academy of Television Arts and Sciences
- Bob Hope Presents the Chrysler Theatre, a television series on NBC from 1963 to 1967
- Bobby Hope, Scottish footballer
- Hollywood-Burbank Airport or Bob Hope Airport
  - Burbank Airport–South station or Bob Hope Airport Train Station
- Robert Hope (disambiguation)
