= The Best Crowd We Ever Had =

Live album by The Elders
- Released: 2004
- Label: PubTone

The Best Crowd We Ever Had is The Elders' first live album.

== Track listing ==
1. "The Best Crowd We Ever Had" - 0:33
2. "1849" - 4:44
3. "Packy Go Home" - 5:31
4. "Fire in the Hole" - 4:34
5. "Moore Street Girls" - 3:51
6. "Message from the Battle Zone" - 4:23
7. "Saint Kevin" - 4:27
8. "True Believer" - 4:08
9. "Men of Erin" - 3:26
10. "Galway Girl" - 4:22
11. "It'll Be Alright" - 3:56
12. "Buzz's Jig" - 4:17
13. "Ten Pound Earhole" - 6:02
14. "Turning Point" - 3:39
15. "1849" - 3:54
