= Feed the Flames =

2024 single by Gemma Hayes

Single by Gemma Hayes
- Released: 25 January 2024
- Recorded: 2022–2023
- Genre: Alternative
- Label: Chasing Dragons
- Songwriters: Gemma Hayes; Lisa Hannigan
- Producer: Dave Odlum

Gemma Hayes singles chronology
"High & Low" (2023)	"Feed the Flames" (2024)	"Hardwired" (2024)

"Feed the Flames" is the second single release by Irish singer-songwriter Gemma Hayes, released on 25 January 2024. It features on her sixth studio album, Blind Faith.

== Background ==
"Feed the Flames" is the second single from Gemma Hayes's new album, which is expected to be released in mid-2024. Promoting the new single, Hayes explained that the song was influenced by the film Who's Afraid of Virginia Woolf?, saying:

I originally began writing the song after watching Who's Afraid of Virginia Woolf with Elizabeth Taylor and Richard Burton. Knowing a bit about their relationship off screen I was really taken by the depth of their connection, it was a living, breathing fire. What I got from delving into their relationship is that you can love something or someone so much only for your human fallibility to come along and destroy it.

The song was co-produced with Dave Odlum and features back-up vocals and song writing credits from Lisa Hannigan.

== Release ==
It received airplay on RTÉ Radio 1 and was featured on their recommended new songs playlist.

== Music video ==
The "Feed the Flames" music video was filmed on location at Baltimore in West Cork, Ireland and was produced by the Wonder Brothers.
