= The Roads Don't Love You =

2005 album by Gemma Hayes

Studio album by Gemma Hayes
- Released: 28 October 2005
- Recorded: 2004–2005
- Genre: Alternative rock
- Length: 46:42
- Label: Source
- Producer: Gemma Hayes and Joey Waronker

Gemma Hayes chronology
Night on My Side (2002)	The Roads Don't Love You (2005)	The Hollow of Morning (2008)

Alternative cover
- International cover (except Ireland)

Singles from The Roads Don't Love You
- 1. "Happy Sad" Released: 14 November 2005; 2. "Undercover" Released: 20 February 2006

Professional ratings
Review scores
Source	Rating
AllMusic	link
RTÉ Entertainment	link
Gaffa	link

The Roads Don't Love You is the second album by Irish singer-songwriter Gemma Hayes, released in the Republic of Ireland on 28 October 2005, 31 October 2005 in the United Kingdom, and 15 November 2005 in North America. In 2006, Gemma received a nomination for Best Irish Female at the 2006 Ireland Music Awards where she also performed live and picked up the award.

The title is taken from a line in the Magnetic Fields song "Long Vermont Roads". During the tour supporting the release of The Roads Don't Love You in America, a short EP titled Sampler was released.

The album was finally made available in the US as a download through iTunes in July 2014.

== Background and recording ==
The recording of this album was heavily influenced by Hayes' move to Los Angeles. Heading stateside with some demos, Hayes called upon assistance from Joey Waronker (producer) and Nigel Godrich (mixer) to help with the recording of the album. The recording of The Roads Don't Love You came after a longer period of self-doubt by Hayes following the critical acclaim of her debut album. Following the release of this album, both Hayes and Source Records parted ways due to restructuring at Virgin Records.

Hayes continued to promote the album in Ireland and the US and went on to release two singles from the album.

== Track listing ==
All songs written by Gemma Hayes.

1. "Two Step"
2. "Another for the Darkness"
3. "Happy Sad"
4. "Easy on the Eye"
5. "Keep Me Here"
6. "Undercover"
7. "Nothing Can"
8. "Helen"
9. "Something in My Way"
10. "Horses"
11. "Tomorrow"
  - "Pull Me In" (hidden track)

=== Sampler Track listing ===
All songs written by Gemma Hayes.

1. "Easy on the Eye"
2. "Hanging Around"
3. "Happy Sad"
4. "Nothing Can"

== Charts ==
Chart (2005)	Peak position
Irish Album Chart	13
UK Album Chart	98
