= Making My Way Back =

Single by Gemma Hayes

from the album Bones + Longing
- Released: 6 November 2014 (Ireland only)
- Recorded: 2013–2014
- Genre: Alternative
- Length: 4:25
- Label: Chasing Dragons
- Songwriter(s): Gemma Hayes
- Producer(s): Dave Odlum

Gemma Hayes singles chronology
"Chasing" (2014)	"Making My Way Back" (2014)	"Palomino" (2015)

"Making My Way Back" is a song written by Irish singer-songwriter Gemma Hayes, and is the second single release in Ireland from her fifth studio album, Bones + Longing.

== Background and release ==
A preview of the track was made available during the recording process on 24 June 2014. It was revealed in Irish press reports the track would be used in the 2014 Aldi Ireland advertising campaign. In early October 2014, Gemma performed the song at a special press call for the advertising campaign in Dublin. On 6 November 2014 the advert premiered on RTÉ One. The track appeared as in the Irish iTunes store on 6 November 2014. The song has been picked up by a number of radio stations in Ireland including RTÉ 2XM and News Talk.

The track initially appeared on her fifth studio album as "Making My Way" due to an error.

== Charts ==
Chart performance for "Making My Way Back"
Chart (2014)	Peak position
Ireland (IRMA)	83
