= Let a Good Thing Go =

Single by Gemma Hayes
- Released: 12 August 2002
- Genre: Alternative
- Label: Source
- Songwriter(s): Gemma Hayes
- Producer(s): Gemma Hayes, Dave Fridmann

Gemma Hayes singles chronology
"Hanging Around" (2002)	"Let a Good Thing Go" (2002)	"Back of My Hand" (2002)

Alternative cover
- 7" cover

"Let a Good Thing Go" is the second single by Irish singer-songwriter Gemma Hayes, released in 2002 on the Source Records label.

Two versions of the single were released – incorporating slightly different covers.

== Track listing ==
=== CD 1 ===
All songs written by Gemma Hayes.

1. "Let a Good Thing Go"
2. "Hanging Around" (acoustic)
3. "Pieces of Glass" (radio session)

Also includes video for "Let a Good Thing Go" (Directed by Sam Brown)

=== CD 2 ===
1. "Let a Good Thing Go"
2. "Summers in Doubt"
3. "Ran for Miles" (home demo)

=== 7" ===
1. "Let a Good Thing Go"
2. "Pieces of Glass" (radio session)

== Charts ==
Chart (2002)	Peak position
UK Singles (OCC)	54
