= Back of My Hand (Gemma Hayes song) =

Single by Gemma Hayes
- Released: 26 September 2002
- Genre: Alternative
- Label: Source
- Songwriter: Gemma Hayes
- Producers: Gemma Hayes, Dave Fridmann

Gemma Hayes singles chronology
"Let a Good Thing Go" (2002)	"Back of My Hand" (2002)	"Happy Sad" (2005)

"Back of My Hand" is the third single by Irish singer-songwriter Gemma Hayes taken from her Night on My Side album release. The single was released on 30 September 2002 by Source Records.

Two versions of the single were released - incorporating slightly different covers and track listings. The second CD was very limited upon release and the single was only available in Ireland.

A re-worked version of the track appeared on the 2003 US release of Night on My Side. A digital version of the song appeared on iTunes on 1 March 2003.

== Music video ==
The music video was directed by Sam Brown. The video was shot on location in America and features Hayes avoiding two business men dressed in suits. Towards the end of the video Hayes stumbles across a child.

== Track listing ==
=== CD 1 ===
All songs written by Gemma Hayes.

1. "Back of My Hand"
2. "Mama What's That Song"
3. "Song for Julie"

- Back of My Hand Video - directed by Sam Brown

=== CD 2 (Ireland only) ===
1. "Back of My Hand"
2. "My Friend Christian"
3. "Let a Good Thing Go" (live and alternative version for Radio 1)

=== 7" vinyl ===
A. "Back of My Hand"
B. "Song for Julie"
