= Palomino (song) =

Single by Gemma Hayes

from the album Bones + Longing
- Released: 17 April 2015
- Recorded: 2013–2014
- Genre: Alternative
- Label: Chasing Dragons
- Songwriter: Gemma Hayes
- Producer: Dave Odlum

Gemma Hayes singles chronology
"Making My Way Back" (2014)	"Palomino" (2015)	"Laughter" (2015)

"Palomino" is a song written by Irish singer-songwriter Gemma Hayes and the third single release from her fifth studio album Bones + Longing.

== Background and release ==
"Palomino" was initially scheduled as the first single to be released from Gemma Hayes' fifth studio album Bones+Longing. The single release was delayed to make way for "Chasing". Upon the release of the album in November 2014, "Palomino" featured regularly on radio in Ireland. The single appeared regularly on Newstalk, Today FM and TXFM. By spring 2015, the track was released as the second track from the LP in France, Germany and Australia among other territories. It is the third single release in Ireland. The track has featured heavily on Australian music radio station Double J.

In February 2015, Hayes released a video featuring an acoustic version of the track, the video recorded in London in 2014.

During promos in France and Germany, Hayes performed the track to coincide with the release of the album in both territories.

On April 18, 2015, "Palomino" was released on a very limited edition release to celebrate Record Store Day. The track is featured on a 7" vinyl along with "Shit I Own". Only 500 copies have been made and were available to a number of record shops across Europe.

== Music video ==
On 24 March 2015, during an interview with RTÉ 2fm, Hayes explained the video would be shot within the next few weeks. The music video premiered on YouTube on 2 June 2015. The music video was filmed in April and May, over a couple of weekends in East London, by Northern Irish Director Babysweet, and it shows off the projection work of Annelisa Keestra. Darcy, the Palomino, was filmed at his home in Sussex, United Kingdom. The horses appearance in Hackney Wick along with Gemma Hayes is just an illusion.

== Popular culture ==
"Palomino" is used in the 2016 summer-spring advertising campaign for French fashion label Cyrillus.

== Track listing ==
7" vinyl

1. "Palomino" – 3:42
2. "Shit I Own" – 2:14
