= Hardwired (Gemma Hayes song) =

2024 single by Gemma Hayes

Single by Gemma Hayes

from the album Blind Faith
- Released: 10 May 2024
- Recorded: 2022
- Length: 4:17
- Label: Gemma Hayes Music
- Songwriter: Gemma Hayes
- Producer: Dave Odlum

Gemma Hayes singles chronology
"Feed the Flames" (2024)	"Hardwired" (2024)	"Another Love" (2024)

"Hardwired" is a song written by Irish singer-songwriter Gemma Hayes and the third single release from her sixth studio album, Blind Faith. The single was released on 10 May 2024.

== Background and release ==
The song was recorded between 2022 and 2023 while she was working on her sixth studio album. Produced by Gemma Hayes (guitars, tambourine and vocals), David Odlum (guitars, bass, synth keyboards), and Karl Odlum (bass and synth keywords), they also contributed to the track by playing instruments and providing vocals.

Commenting on the song Hayes stated "I wanted to take a musical freeze frame of the world post-Covid,” Gemma says of the track. “A place where, according to statistics, we were more captured by our devices and social media content than ever before. [...] We were sitting ducks for bad actors to misinform us in a way that felt like real information. I felt like unplugging the world, waiting ten seconds and plugging it back in again and thus was born, 'Hardwired.'"

Upon its release the single was selected as Track of the Day by Hot Press. The track has been described as being "dark and melodic underpinnings of the arrangement occasionally veer into something harder, but that just adds to the impact of not just the vocals, but the unvarnished message of the lyrics."

== Music video ==
A music video was filmed at The Whale Theatre in Greystones, County Wicklow in Ireland and directed by The Wonder Brothers. The video features Gemma on stage performing with her band. The video premiered on YouTube on 15 May 2024.
