= Happy Sad (song) =

Single by Gemma Hayes
- Released: 11 November 2005 Republic of Ireland; 14 November 2005 United Kingdom
- Genre: Alternative
- Length: 4:20
- Label: Source Records
- Songwriter(s): Stephin Merritt, Gemma Hayes
- Producer(s): Gemma Hayes, Joey Waronker

Gemma Hayes singles chronology
| "Back of My Hand" (2002) | "Happy Sad" (2005) | "Undercover" (2006) |

"Happy Sad" is the first single from Irish singer-songwriter Gemma Hayes' second album, The Roads Don't Love You, released in 2005 on the Source Records label.

== Track listing ==
=== CD 1 ===
1. "Happy Sad"
2. "Holy Places"

=== 7" ===
1. "Happy Sad"
2. "Bad Day"

Vinyl Edition Cover

== Charts ==
| Chart (2005) | Peak position |
|---|---|
| UK Singles Chart | 102 |
