= American Wake =

Studio album by The Elders
- Released: April 6, 2004
- Label: PubTone

American Wake is the third album by Kansas City Celtic rock band The Elders.

== Track listing ==
1. "Moore St. Girls"
2. "Hardline"
3. "American Wake"
4. "St. Kevin"
5. "Men of Erin"
6. "Big Box Dinny"
7. "Nation of Love"
8. "Turnpike"
9. "Ballymun Road"
10. "Dig Me A Hole"
11. "If I Know Murphy"
12. "Haverty Boys"
13. "Seventeen"
14. "The Auld Land"
