= Keep Running =

Single by Gemma Hayes

from the album Let It Break
- Released: August 2011
- Recorded: 2010
- Genre: Alternative
- Label: GH Music; Fulfill
- Songwriter: Gemma Hayes
- Producer: Dave Odlum

Gemma Hayes singles chronology
"Shock The System" (2011)	"Keep Running" (2011)	"Wicked Game" (2012)

"Keep Running" is a song written by Irish singer-songwriter Gemma Hayes for her fourth studio album Let It Break. It was the second single release from the album.

== Background ==
The song was originally titled 'Tokyo' and included some lyrics from the unreleased track 'Turning.' It first appeared on her playlist while touring Ireland during 2010 and 2011, and was featured on the cultural show Imeall on 21 April 2010.

The song later appeared on the Let It Break track listing as 'Keep Running.' It was initially expected to be the album's first single. Hayes later explained that the track's name was changed from 'Tokyo' to 'Keep Running' as the song's direction evolved during production. Additionally, some of the lyrics could have been interpreted as referencing the 2011 earthquake in Japan, although this was not the intended meaning.

== Release ==
The song was released as a download only on Friday, 26 August 2011 in Ireland. Outside Ireland, 'Keep Running' was released as promo track in March 2012 following the re-release of Let It Break.

== Music video ==
A music video premiered on 26 August 2011 on her YouTube page. The video was directed by her then boyfriend Brinton Bryan. The single is complemented by a music video which was shot on location in LA in July 2011. The videos theme is based around homelessness, where Gemma Hayes appears as herself alongside US actor Jason Ritter.

== Popular culture ==
The track appeared on a number of US drama series.
