= Out of Our Hands =

Single by Gemma Hayes

from the album The Hollow of Morning
- Released: 2 May 2008
- Recorded: 2007
- Genre: Alternative
- Length: 3:41
- Label: ATC; GH Music
- Songwriter(s): Gemma Hayes
- Producer(s): Dave Odlum

Gemma Hayes singles chronology
"Undercover" (2006)	"Out of Our Hands" (2008)	"Home" (2008)

"Out of Our Hands" is a song written by Irish singer-songwriter Gemma Hayes for her third album The Hollow of Morning. It was released digitally on 2 May 2008 as the album's first single.

== Music video ==
No music video was shot for "Out of Our Hands", despite being the album's lead single. However, the second single released from the album, "Home", did receive video treatment.

== Popular culture ==
- Her song 'Out of Our Hands' was featured in ER episode "T-Minus-6" (from Season 15) which aired on 26 February 2009 on NBC and 10 May 2009 on RTÉ One.
- The song later appeared in US TV series the Vampire Diaries. It featured in episode 1 ('The Return') of season 2 which aired on 9 September 2010 on The CW.

== Release history ==
Region	Date
Ireland	2 May 2008
United Kingdom	5 May 2008
Australia	5 May 2008
Europe	6 May 2008
