= The Pale (band) =

Irish rock and indie band

- Origin: Dublin, Ireland
- Genres: Rock, indie
- Years active: 1990–present
- Labels: 1969 Records, A&M Records Gudenfast, Psychonavigation
- Members: Matthew Devereux; Shane Wearen; Neil Gannon; Aidan O'Grady; Ger Eaton
- Past members: David O'Shea; Andy Fitzsimons; Peter Balfe; Andy O'Brien; Darren Flynn; Kim Farrelly; Frailan Moran Mendive; Audrey Bridgeman; Cathy Byrne; Emma Shanley; Colm Quearney; Brian Brody; Stephen O'Keefe; Bernard Byrne; Sean Molloy; Anne-Marie McCormack; Lloyd Byrne; Liz Bonnin; Columb Farrelly; Gavin O'Brien
- Website: Official website

The Pale are an Irish band of varying genres including rock, and indie. They have recorded twelve albums and have toured extensively in Ireland and abroad.

== Formation and early years ==
The Pale formed in Dublin in 1990 with the original line-up settling as Matthew Devereux on vocals, Shane Wearen on mandolin, Sean Molloy on bass. The band honed their musical and performance skills by busking on Dublin's Grafton street, alongside fellow Irish musicians, Kila, Paddy Casey, Mic Christopher and Glen Hansard.

They began their live career with a residency in the International Bar in Dublin. One feature that distinguished the early Pale from other bands was their decision to use a drum machine instead of a drummer.

With some financial backing from U2 Manager, Paul McGuinness, the band recorded two mini albums called Why Go Bald (1990) and The Happy Ring House (1991). Both titles for were taken from neon signs in Dublin, one on Dame Lane and the other on O'Connell Street in Dublin.

The mini-albums, coupled with the band's growing live reputation led to international interest and their eventual signing to A&M records in early 1992. They released their debut album on A&M Records in 1992 called Here's One We Made Earlier. The album was critically praised in the music press with Vox Magazine in the UK memorably describe its sound as "conventional balladry to make MOR stalwarts weep enviously, alongside mandolin frenzy that could only otherwise exist if Les Voix Bulgares became involved in an industrial drinking accident

The singles from that debut were "Dogs With No Tails", "Butterfly", and "Shut Up Venus". The former peaked at No. 51 in the UK Singles Chart in June 1992.

The band received Hot Press awards in 1992 for Best Single (Butterfly) and Best Album Production (Here's One We Made Earlier).

During this time the band's reputation as a formidable live act grew, with their live shows being described as "part theatre/part gig, Matthew (Devereux) paces the boards like a demented dervish, growling confessions to three part harmonies" The band played the Irish music festival Feile in Thurles and toured extensively in Ireland, the UK, Europe, US and as far afield as Japan.

In 1993, Matthew Devereux made a cameo in the TV adaptation of Roddy Doyle's The Snapper

== Independent releases ==
In 1993 the band broke from A&M Records and released The Pale EP on Underscore Records, which peaked at number 7 in the Irish charts. The following year the band's second album Ripe was released to critical acclaim. with The Irish Times saying of the band; "they may sound like a bunch of mad Hare Krishnas drunk on Buckfast, but they sent the crowd wild with up-tempo mandolin epics...Leave rock n'roll to the remaining one percent with imagination and it will never die"

Following a break with management the band set up Gudenfast records which was to be the vehicle for their next three releases, Cheapside (1996), Cripplegate (1997) and Spudgun (1997). The albums were all self-produced and were only made available through the band's fan-club and at gigs. During this time the band's line-up expanded to include more traditional rock elements such as guitar and drums and the reliance on pre-recorded sounds lessened. As well as the mainstays Matthew Devereux, Shane Wearen and Emma Shanley, the band was augmented by Peter Balfe on drums, Brian Brody on guitar, Rob Malone on bass.

The band toured extensively during this period with tours around Europe, UK and Ireland. The tours were financed by selling the records independently.

From 1997 to 1999, the band toured under the moniker Produkt and were, for some time, the house band for an independent circus.

== Psychonavigation and Lonely Space Age ==
Following a three-year hiatus, the band released the album Lonely Space Age on Dublin electronic music label Psychonavigation Records. The band's line-up at that stage consisted of Matthew Devereux, Darren Flynn and Emma Shanley. The album is noteworthy for its electronic stylings, with Hot Press magazine praising its "compelling take on the ambient aesthetic". It is also notable for featuring only one song with founding member Shane Wearen, "Gain From Pain".

During this time Matthew Devereux released a solo electronic album, Tap, Tap, Tap, and EP Russian Space Race Auction, also on Psychonavigation.

The band toured the album extensively. with David O'Shea, Andy O'Brien, Bernard Byrne and Stephen O'Keefe joining the band as part of the tour Due to the connection with Psychonavigation Records, the band played on the Dance Stage in Witnness.

== 1969 Records ==
In 2004 the band, now consisting of Matthew Devereux, David O'Shea, Andy O'Brien, Bernard Byrne and Stephen O'Keefe convened to record the unreleased album Delete Me produced by long-term member Darren Flynn. A fraught recording, the sessions would see drummer Steven O'Keefe break his foot, Matthew Devereux puncture his eardrums and Dave O'Shea involved in a car crash, all in the same week. The album was shelved, with only one song, a live version of "Proverbial Shirt" appearing at the time on the 10 Summer Nights compilation album. Seven songs from this album would eventually surface on 2013's 21 Song Salute compilation.

Following the non-release of Delete Me a reconstituted line-up of The Pale, featuring the return of original member Shane Wearen and former Lir guitarist Colm Quearney, recorded The Final Garden EP. The tracks were released in 2005 on Devereux Records.

Writing in the Irish Independent, Ed Power said of the new songs "they write extravagant torch songs, full of heartbreak and crushing melancholy, but also exuding an insatiable hunger for life."

In 2008, Matthew Devereux and Shane Wearen appeared in the Irish independent movie, Intersection Number 9, which also featured a number of songs for The Pale on its soundtrack.

The same year saw drummer Aidan O'Grady joining the band. He went on to play a key role in the band appearing on all subsequent recordings and becoming a stalwart of their live shows. An accomplished player, O'Grady has played with numerous groups, including Las Vegas Basement and Pugwash.

That summer the band headlined a number of festivals in Czech Republic, where they have maintained a large level of popularity.

Upon their return they released the single "Chocolate Factory" as a free download. The song was accompanied by a music video recorded as part of an animation workshop at the Folk Holidays festival in Czech Republic.

In May 2009, the album Proper Order was released on 1969 Records. Produced by Darren Flynn, the album received positive reviews. The tracks "Lights Out Boys", "Catholic Credit Card" and "Chocolate Factory", featured lyrical content that The Evening Herald's Eamon Carr noted had "a disturbing undertow in the aftermath of the scandals highlighted by the Ryan Report.".

The live shows for Proper Order saw Andy O'Brien return to the band on guitar and keyboards.

In 2009, Matthew Devereux moved to the Czech Republic and began writing songs for what would become the band's next album, I Woke Up And I Was Gone The album was recorded at Sono Studios, marking the first time that the band had recorded outside of Ireland.

The single "Such Dumb Luck" was released in April 2016. The single was produced by Keith Farrell The single was shortlisted for Pure M magazine's 2016 'Single Of The Year'.

== Members ==
- Matthew Devereux – Vocals
- Shane Wearen – Mandolin, Fiddle, Bouzouki
- Ger Eaton – Guitar, Keyboard
- Aidan O'Grady – Drums
- Neil Gannon - Bass

== Albums ==
- Here's One We Made Earlier - 1992
- Ripe - 1994
- Cheapside - 1995
- Cripplegate - 1996
- Spudgun - 1996
- Lonely Space Age - 2002
- The Contents of a Shipwreck – 2007
- Proper Order – 2009
- I Woke Up and I Was Gone – 2012
- 21 Song Salute – 2013
- Merciful Hour - 2019
