= Ann Scott (singer) =

Irish musician

- Origin: Dublin, Ireland
- Years active: 2001 – present
- Labels: Raghouse Records
- Website: http://www.annscott.net

Ann Scott is an Irish singer-songwriter from Dublin, Ireland.

== Music career ==
- Ann Scott recorded her debut album Poor Horse between 2002 and 2003. Prior to its release in 2004, Scott released three EPs Pauper Tiger, Madness and Knife.
- Her debut album received positive reviews where it was voted in Hot Press Magazine's Top 100 Irish Albums Ever at number 58. Between the releases of her EPs (starting with Pauper Tiger in 2002) and first album Poor Horse in 2004, Ann Scott toured the Republic of Ireland extensively. Her second album We're Smiling released in 2006 received positive reviews and followed with a tour of the Republic of Ireland. The album was later released outside Ireland in early 2008 with a short tour of the United Kingdom. In 2009, Scott was named among The Irish Times The Ticket Top 50 Irish acts right now, while a recent live review from The Irish Times, describes her performance as 'a beguiling snapshot of a musician in thrall to her music but not her ego.'
- Scott has appeared alongside and supported live Blondie, Fairport Convention, Gemma Hayes, Patti Smith and Howe Gelb on tour. She has also worked with Kila, David Kitt and Mark Geary. Scott has toured Republic of Ireland, America and the United Kingdom.
- Since 2009 and 2010 Scott has received more media attention in the United Kingdom featuring regularly on XFM, BBC Radio 1 and BBC 6 Music. Scott supported fellow Irish artist Gemma Hayes throughout from November 2009 to May 2010 on her European Winter/Spring Tour.
- In April 2010 Ann Scott announced details about her third album. On 4 June 2010 her third album Flo was released in Ireland, with a UK-European release expected for 12 July 2010. The third album features 14 tracks guided by Karl Odlum. The album features appearances by Gemma Hayes and Kim Porcelli. The album was part-recorded in Steve Albini’s Electrical Audio studio. Promotion for the album began with the release of Candy as the debut single from the album and a tour of Ireland during May and June 2010. The promo single Candy was noticed by BBC Radio where it appeared regularly on BBC 6 Music's Introducing
- In 2012, her track "Love Is In Him" appeared in Irish horror film Citadel which featured as part of IFI Horrorthon 2012. On 19 October 2012 Ann Scott announced that a new album would be released in 2013.
- Scott's fourth studio album, Venus to the Sky, was independently released in Ireland on 18 October 2013. The album launch took place at Dublin's The Grand Social on 11 October.

== Awards ==
Meteor Ireland Music Awards

- (2005) - Best Irish Female Artist [Nominated]
- (2007) - Best Irish Female Artist [Nominated]

== Albums / EPs ==
Albums

- Poor Horse (2004)
- We're Smiling (2006)
- Flo (2010)
- Venus to the Sky (2013)

EPs

- Pauper Tiger (2002)
- Knife (2004)
- Universe Remix EP (2011)
- The Killerman Remix EP (2011)

== Singles ==
- Pauper (2004)
- Madness (2005)
- Knife (2005)
- Poor Horse (2005)
- Mountain (2006)
- Hot Day/Jealousy (2007)
- Always (2009)
- Candy (2010)

Collaborations

- From a Distance (2011), Magdalene Survivors Together charity single
