= Hanging Around (Gemma Hayes song) =

Single by Gemma Hayes

from the album Night on My Side
- Released: 13 May 2002
- Genre: Alternative rock
- Length: 3:39
- Label: Source, Astralwerks
- Songwriter(s): Gemma Hayes
- Producer(s): Gemma Hayes, Dave Fridmann

Gemma Hayes singles chronology
"Hanging Around" (2002)	"Let a Good Thing Go" (2002)

"Hanging Around" is the first single by Irish singer-songwriter Gemma Hayes, released in 2002 on the Source Records label. The single is taken from her debut album Night on My Side. The music video for the song made its debut outside Ireland on MTV France on 27 April 2002.

== Track listing ==
All songs written by Gemma Hayes.

1. "Hanging Around"
2. "Stop the Wheel"
3. "Parked"

Also includes video for "Hanging Around", directed by John Hillcoat.

== Charts ==
Chart (2002)	Peak position
Irish Singles Chart	50
UK Singles Chart	62
