= The Hollow of Morning =

Studio album by Gemma Hayes
- Released: 2 May 2008
- Recorded: 2006–2007
- Genre: Alternative rock; folk
- Length: 36:18
- Label: GH Music; ATC (international); Second Motion (US); Yep Rock (Canada)
- Producer: David Odlum

Gemma Hayes chronology
The Roads Don't Love You (2005)	The Hollow of Morning (2008)	Oliver (2009)

Singles from The Hollow Of Morning
- 1. "Out of Our Hands" Released: 25 April 2008; 2. "Home" Released: February 2009 (promo)

Professional ratings
Review scores
Source	Rating
AllMusic	link
Hot Press	link
The Irish Times	4/5 stars
RTÉ.ie	link
Sunday Business Post	4/5 stars

The Hollow of Morning is the third album by Irish singer-songwriter Gemma Hayes, released on 2 May 2008 in Ireland. The album was released in North America on 20 May 2008 on iTunes. The album received a physical release in the US on 30 September 2008 through Second Motion Records.

The album's title comes from a Samuel Menashe poem.

"Out of Our Hands" was the first single from the album.

== Background ==
Many tracks from the album feature backing vocals and guitars from Irish singer-songwriter Joe Chester who Gemma has previously worked with on his debut album. Others who assisted with producing the album include Paul Noonan from Bell X1 and Kevin Shields from My Bloody Valentine. Originally, the album was to receive a full release in November 2007 at gemmahayes.com, but the album was delayed as Gemma was sourcing a label to distribute the album. The album was mixed by Steve Fitzmaurice and mastered by Greg Calbi.

The album was self-financed and self-released through Gemma's own label GH Music (now Chasing Dragons). The album was licensed to Second Motion Records for distribution in the US and Yep Roc in Canada.

== Singles ==
The first single, "Out of Our Hands", received its first airplay on Irish radio station Today FM on 1 April 2008. The single was released digitally on 2 May 2008. The second single from the album, "Home", was released in September 2008 (digital release only).

== Video promos ==
While no video was made for her first single release "Out of Our Hands", on 13 February 2009, a video for "Home" was released on her Myspace page. The video borrows elements from The Wizard of Oz such as the upside-down house, the yellow brick road and the ruby slippers. While "Home" was released as a digital only release in September 2008, it was re-released due to extensive radio play both in Ireland and the UK and to promote the recent physical release of the album in America.

== Promotion ==
Promotion for the album began in October 2007 in Los Angeles, California at the Hotel Cafe. This was followed by an announcement on 5 March 2008 that Gemma would be touring Ireland and Northern Ireland in April 2008. A month later she announced she would be going on a UK promotional tour in May. Following an interview on Today FM's Breakfast Show on 21 April Gemma confirmed that she would present another live tour in Ireland in late May this time it would be a semi-acoustic tour. Followed with a return to America for a number of live gigs; one important live date being a New York gig with fellow Irish band Bell X1. Gemma returned to Ireland in August and began her second UK tour in September before taking up another tour of America in October. Another tour took place in Ireland in early December 2008.

== Release ==
The album was released in CD format in Ireland on 2 May 2008 available at HMV, Tower Records, Golden Discs and as download through iTunes and 7 Digital. The album was released in the UK and elsewhere on 12 May 2008. With the release in the US/Canada an additional track was made available for customers who purchased the album directly through Second Motion Records. This track is called 'Won't You Stop Looking at Me'. The album was released in North America on 30 September 2008; previously only available as a download.

== Track listing ==
All songs were written by Gemma Hayes

1. "This Is What You Do" – 5:00
2. "Out of Our Hands" – 3:41
3. "January 14th" – 1:32
4. "Home" – 3:11
5. "In Over My Head" – 3:41
6. "Chasing Dragons" – 3:56
7. "Don't Forget" – 3:47
8. "Sad Ol Song" – 3:17
9. "At Constant Speed" – 6:10
10. "Under a Canopy" – 2:10

== Personnel ==
- Gemma Hayes – vocals, arrangement, guitar, piano
- Joe Chester – noise guitar, guitar, backing vocals
- Paul Noonan – drums, backing vocals
- Benzer – drums
- Kevin Shields – guitar
- Karl Odlum – guitar, arrangement
- David Odlum – producer

== Charts ==
Chart performance for The Hollow of Morning
Chart (2008)	Peak position
Irish Albums (IRMA)	12

== Release history ==
Release history and formats for The Hollow of Morning
Region	Date	Label	Format
Ireland	2 May 2008	Gemma Hayes Records	CD/Download
UK	12 May 2008	Gemma Hayes Records	
Australia	19 May 2008	Gemma Hayes Records	
United States	20 May 2008	Second Motion Records	Download
United States	30 September 2008		CD
