= Robert Hope =

Robert Hope may refer to:

- Robert Marsden Hope (1919–1999), New South Wales Supreme Court judge
- Robert Hope (Australian politician) (1812–1878), medical practitioner and member of the Victorian Legislative Council
- Robert Hope-Jones (1859–1914), English musician
- Robert Hope of the Hope baronets
- Bobby Hope (1943–2022), Scottish footballer
- Rob Hope (runner) (born 1974), English fell runner

== See also ==
- Bob Hope (disambiguation)
