= Bones + Longing =

Studio album by Gemma Hayes
- Released: 14 November 2014
- Recorded: April 2013 – June 2014 in Dublin, Noyant-la-Gravoyère and London
- Genres: Pop; shoegaze
- Label: Chasing Dragons
- Producers: David Odlum, Gemma Hayes

Gemma Hayes chronology
Night & Day (2014)	Bones + Longing (2014)	Blind Faith (2024)

Singles from Bones + Longing
- 1. "Chasing" Released: October 2014 (Ireland, UK, US & Canada); 2. "Making My Way Back" Released: 6 November 2014 (Ireland); 3. "Palomino" Released: 17 April 2015; 4. "Laughter" Released: 7 August 2015

Bones + Longing is the fifth studio album by Irish singer-songwriter Gemma Hayes.

The album was released on 14 November in Ireland and on 17 November in the UK, the US and Canada. It was released elsewhere around the world on 2 March 2015 and German speaking territories on 6 March 2015, with a vinyl release on 12 June 2015.

The album was recorded in Dublin, Noyant-la-Gravoyère and London.

== Background and development ==
In June 2012, Gemma Hayes announced she was writing new material in Ireland. Hayes had previously planned to move back to Los Angeles to work on the album, but later decided against this decision and continued to reside in Dublin.

By 9 August 2012, Hayes announced she had begun a side-project with long-term producer David Odlum and was continuing to work on her own material. Hayes also confirmed the future release of a live limited edition vinyl (previously billed for 2013 release).Night & Day's release was deferred until spring 2014 and was funded through her Pledge Music campaign. By October 2012, Hayes began a short tour of Ireland and the UK, Hayes would not return to the live music scene until 2013.

By 22 April 2013, Hayes announced a new batch of songs were written while in Ireland and demos were being finalized in a studio in France where the bones of the fifth studio album (later titled named as Bones+Longing) were recorded.

During July 2013, Hayes returned to Ireland to tour as part of A Woman's Heart. On 16 August 2013 Hayes launched her Pledge Music campaign where fans and pledgers could support the album's production and release

During the early stages of the album's production Hayes became pregnant and production finished in late December and recommenced again in mid-February due to the birth of her baby. On 10 April 2014, Hayes revealed the titles of three new songs 'To Be Your Honey' (a preview of which was made available on her website), 'Palomino' and 'Making My Way Back'. Hayes later confirmed mixing and mastering took place in France the next month

In April 2014, Hayes performed a number of UK gigs prior to the release of the fifth studio album. These gigs were part of her Pledge Music campaign. On 16 June 2014, Hayes confirmed the album was completed.

On 24 June 2014, her management hinted the album's title as Bones & Longing. Following this Hayes discussed the album's production and confirmed new tracks were recorded including 'The Shit I Own' and 'Caught My Hand'. A 21-second snippet of a new track 'Making My Way Back' was also revealed.

On 9 July 2014, the album's producer David Odlum confirmed the albums was mixed and mastered and ready for a late autumn release. On 29 July 2014 Hayes' management confirmed a photoshoot took place to promote the forthcoming album release.

On 1 August 2014, Hayes confirmed through her Pledge Music page her fifth studio album is titled Bones + Longing.

On 22 September 2014, Hayes announced the first single release from album 'Chasing' would precede the album's release due in November.

The album was released independently through her own label Chasing Dragons (similar to Hollow of Morning and Let It Break), it was initially anticipated for the album to be licensed to other labels for release in other territories.

On 20 September 2014, the album's artwork was revealed. On 1 October 2014 the album's full track listing was revealed along with 30-second snippets of each track.

The album was released in Ireland, North America and the UK in November 2014. It received a wider international release in February/March 2015.

== Themes ==
The album's theme has been described as providing somnambulent pop/shoegaze textures that mix the dreamy with the spooky.

== Artwork ==
On 20 September 2014 the artwork for the album was revealed, where it was announced Humphrey Bangham produced the artwork.

== Promotion ==
Hayes began to promote the album in the Republic of Ireland between October 2014 to February 2015 making regular appearances on both national and local radio stations such as Today FM, TXFM and Newstalk performing tracks such as Making My Way Back and To Be Your Honey live in studio.

On 5 December 2014 Hayes was interviewed by arts and cultural show The Works on RTÉ One's where she performed 'To Be Your Honey'.

On 9 December 2014 she made an appearance on Newstalk where she performed two tracks performed 'Making My Way Back' and 'To Be Your Honey'.

As part of the promotion for the new album Hayes the Irish edition of The Sunday Times ran a feature on the artist on 14 December 2014. She would later appear on the cover of Cara Magazine Aer Lingus' in-flight magazine.

Hayes began to promote the album outside Ireland in early 2015 with interviews on BBC Radio in the UK, by March she travelled to France and Germany to do a number of performances. On 2 March the album received an international release with a press release in Paris at Centre Culturel Irlandais where she performed at the venue and did a number of promos for local and national radio in France. On 6 March, Hayes travelled to Germany for promotional purposes where she completed a number of interviews for both German radio and television. She later performed at Berlin's Bar Bobu.

On 24 March 2015 Hayes confirmed live dates across Ireland and the UK. On 24 March 2015 she shared the promo video for 'To Be Your Honey'. On the same day she completed an interview with RTÉ 2fm where she discussed motherhood, her Pledge music campaign and additional gigs in Ireland.

On 26 March 2015 a special promo video was released for "To Be Your Honey" recorded in Paris.

=== Single releases ===
Prior to the album's release "Palomino" was initially planned to be the first promo release but was delayed and replaced with "Chasing". On 9 October 2014 'Chasing' was given for free to those who registered and supported her Pledge Music campaign. The track also appeared on the iTunes store in Ireland, Canada, US and UK on Friday, 10 October 2014 as part of the Bones+Longing pre-order. The single instantly downloaded upon pre-ordering the album. The second single release in Ireland is "Making My Way". This track featured in Aldi Ireland's Christmas advertising campaign. The song appeared on Irish television on 6 November 2014. The track later appeared in the Irish iTunes Store on 6 November 2014.

"Palomino" was released as a single on 18 April 2015 on a limited edition 7" vinyl to mark Record Store Day. The single was also released as a digital download.

=== Airplay ===
Irish radio picked up a number of the tracks from the album upon its release. "Chasing" did not receive the same amount of airplay as other tracks from the album. "Laughter" and "Making My Way Back" were added to the RTÉ 2XM playlist from early November. "Making My Way Back" had more commercial success than "Chasing". Both "Making My Way Back" and "Bones + Longing" received airplay on RTÉ Radio 1. 'Chasing' received airplay on BBC 6 Music. Following the album's release, both "Joy" and "I Dreamt You Were Fine" were picked up by Today FM.

== Release ==
The album is released through Chasing Dragons. The album was released in CD format in Ireland on 14 November 2014. It was then released digitally in Ireland, the UK and North America on 17 November 2015

The vinyl release was delayed numerous times before being made available in early June 2015. The limited deluxe edition was released in late September/early October 2015. The standard vinyl edition features the original 11 tracks, while a very limited deluxe vinyl edition (300 in total) is featured in a 12" case bound hardback cover, with a 32-page booklet with exclusive photos from the recording process and song lyrics. Each deluxe edition is hand numbered. due for release in June 2015.

== Critical reception ==
Professional ratings
Review scores
Source	Rating
ABC Music Reviews	4.5/5 stars
The Arts Desk	4/5 stars
Drowned in Sound	8/10
The Irish Times	4/5 stars
Mojo	4/5 stars
State Press	3.5/5 stars

Upon release Bones + Longing received positive reviews from critics.

The UK's Mojo gave the album 4/5. London's Evening Standard described the album as "still drifting beautifully onwards". RTÉ 2XM featured the LP in their Albums of the Week, describing the album as "her strongest album...that will enchant even the most cynical musical soul". Drowned in Sound gave the album 8/10, saying it is full of "depth and texture". The Arts Desk defined the album as "bound to form an intimate bond with its audience".

== Commercial performance ==
Following the album's debut in the Irish Albums Chart it reached number 38, making it her worst performing album. The album failed to chart in other territories.

== Track listing ==
All tracks written by Gemma Hayes.

Standard CD / download / vinyl version

No.	Title	Length
1.	"Laughter"	4:53
2.	"Dreamt You Were Fine"	3:23
3.	"Iona"	3:59
4.	"Joy"	3:11
5.	"Dark Moon"	2:58
6.	"Palomino"	3:42
7.	"To Be Your Honey"	3:34
8.	"Chasing"	5:00
9.	"Making My Way"	4:25
10.	"Caught"	2:29
11.	"Bones and Longing"	3:37

International Apple Music bonus track version (2014/2015)
No.	Title	Length
1.	"Laughter"	4:53
2.	"Dreamt You Were Fine"	3:23
3.	"Iona"	3:59
4.	"Joy"	3:11
5.	"Dark Moon"	2:58
6.	"Palomino"	3:42
7.	"To Be Your Honey"	3:34
8.	"Chasing"	5:00
9.	"Making My Way"	4:25
10.	"Caught"	2:29
11.	"Bones and Longing"	3:37
12.	"The Shit I Own" (bonus track)	2:14

Limited edition vinyl edition (2015)
No.	Title	Length
1.	"Laughter"	4:53
2.	"Dreamt You Were Fine"	3:23
3.	"Iona"	3:59
4.	"Joy"	3:11
5.	"Dark Moon"	2:58
6.	"Palomino"	3:42
7.	"To Be Your Honey"	3:34
8.	"Chasing"	5:00
9.	"Making My Way"	4:25
10.	"Caught"	2:29
11.	"Bones and Longing"	3:37
12.	"The Shit I Own" (bonus track)	2:14
13.	"Slowdive" (bonus track)
14.	"Swimming in the Flood" (bonus track)

Standard edition vinyl (2015)
No.	Title	Length
1.	"Laughter"
2.	"Dreamt You Were Fine"
3.	"Iona"
4.	"Joy"
5.	"Chasing"
6.	"Bones and Longing"
7.	"Dark Moon"
8.	"Caught"
9.	"To Be Your Honey"
10.	"Palomino"
11.	"Making My Way Back"

== Personnel ==
- Gemma Hayes – vocals, guitar, piano, arrangement, producer, programming, bassline programming, vocal arrangement, voice arrangement
- David Odlum – producer, engineer, guitar, synth, beats, bass and vocals
- Romy – keys, synths and vocals
- Mark Stanley – guest drummer on "Iona"
- Simon Long – photography
- Pip – photography
- Jayne Gould – design
- Humphrey Bangham – artwork

== Charts ==
Chart performance for Bones + Longing
Chart (2014)	Peak position
Irish Albums (IRMA)	38

== Release history ==
Release history for Bones + Longing
Region	Date	Distributing label
Ireland	14 November 2014	Chasing Dragons
United Kingdom	17 November 2014	Kartel
United States	2 March 2015	Chasing Dragons, Fontana, Kartel Bertus
Canada	2 March 2015	Chasing Dragons, Fontana, Kartel Bertus
France	2 March 2015	Chasing Dragon, Kartel, Membrane
Germany, Switzerland, & Austria	6 March 2015	Chasing Dragon, Kartel, Membrane
Netherlands	26 March 2015	
Japan	2 March 2015	Chasing Dragons, Kartel
Europe	12 June 2015 (vinyl)	Chasing Dragons, Kartel
