= Luan Parle =

Irish singer-songwriter and musician

- Born: Luan Maureen Parle
- Origin: County Wicklow, Ireland
- Genres: Country, americana, alternative country, folk, country pop, roots, acoustic, country rock
- Occupations: Singer, songwriter, musician, producer
- Instruments: Guitar, piano, harmonica
- Years active: 1998–present
- Labels: Anim Records, Sony Music, Sony BMG, Twenty-First Artists Management, LPR Records
- Website: luanparle.com

Luan Parle (pronounced Lu-on) is an Irish performing artist, songwriter, composer and producer. Parle won a Meteor Ireland Music Award for Best Irish Female and has written and recorded with songwriters and producers Bill Bottrell, Chris Kimsey, and Billy Steinberg. Parle signed her first record deal at the age of 12 & released her debut album "First Impressions". She later signed with Elton John's Management Company Twenty-First Artists. She signed a record deal with Sony Records and released her album Free in 2007.

== Career ==
In 2002 Parle signed to Sony Music Ireland and released her first single with Sony – a Diane Warren penned cover titled "When I See You Smile" (peaking at number 15 & spending 5 weeks in the Irish Charts) – followed by a self-penned single "More Than a Ghost". Parle later went on to re-record the song, changing the title to "Ghost". "Ghost" spent 10 weeks in the Irish Charts, peaking at number 10. Parle recorded "Ghost" in Irish, as "Taibhse", for Ceol 08 which reached number 1 in the compilation Irish Album Charts. Having signed a management deal with Twenty-First Artists, which was Elton John's management company, Parle joined James Blunt on his UK and Irish tour and opened for Elton John at London's Hammersmith Apollo.

Parle recorded an album with producer Bill Bottrell in Mendocino, California. As of 2020, the album had not been released. She holds the Meteor Ireland Music Award for ‘Best Irish Female’, and received the ‘Tatler Woman of the Year’ Music Award. In 2010, Parle released her album The Full Circle with one of the tracks "Sita" featuring on A Women's Heart Then & Now. In 2012, "The Little Match Girl", co-written with Gavin Ralston, featured on RTÉ Radio 1's album release A Murray Christmas.

Since 2008, Parle has been facilitating songwriting and performance workshops and classes in primary schools, secondary schools and colleges in Ireland.

"My Hero" was released in 2013. This song was written by Parle and Gavin Ralston with secondary school students during a songwriting workshop. The song topped the iTunes charts and reached No. 7 in the Official Irish Charts. It went viral on several entertainment news sites.

In November 2014, Parle released "Day Is Done" taken from Parle's EP Roll the Dice. Further single releases "Roll the Dice" and "You’re Not Here" followed; "Day Is Done" peaked at No. 8 in the Irish Radio Airplay Chart reaching an audience of almost 8 million listeners.

In February 2017, Parle released "Give Me Shelter" from her Songs From The Vault Collection. "Give Me Shelter" was the first release from a series of monthly digital releases and topped the iTunes Chart on the first day of release. During September 2017, Parle returned to the classroom alongside IMRO (Irish Music Rights Organisation) to deliver a songwriting workshop to the students of Coláiste Chill Mhantáin. The resulting song, "Your Love Still Guides My Way", performed by the students, was released through Parle's own label LPR Records and was launched by Minister for Health Simon Harris. All proceeds were donated to the Irish Heart Foundation and The Alzheimer Society of Ireland. "Your Love Still Guides My Way" went straight to No.1 in iTunes and No. 10 in the Official Singles Downloads Chart on Friday 29 September 2017.

During 2019, Parle presented a songwriting series for IMRO & RTÉ Television Ireland's Favourite Folk Song in which Parle interviewed other Irish singers/songwriters. Ireland's Favourite Folk Song was launched on The Late Late Show in January 2019 where Parle joined a line up of Irish artists, including Eleanor McEvoy and Paddy Casey to perform a rendition of On Raglan Road. Parle joined the Elaine TV Show on Virgin Media One in March 2019 and appeared as a regular panelist on the show.

After spending a number of years touring, Parle returned to the studio to record her fourth studio album Never Say Goodbye, released 7 February 2020. The album which she co-produced with Barnes features 10 original tracks including two co-writes and productions with Dire Straits guitarist Hal Lindes. "My Something Beautiful", the first single from the album, was released on 17 January 2020, kicking off Parle's nationwide tour. Never Say Goodbye made the Hot Press Hot for 2020 Irish albums list and The Choice Music Prize long-list. Reviews of the album included coverage in The Sunday Times, The Irish Independent, broadsheet.ie, The Sunday World, 4/5 Stars from Folk & Tumble, 8/10 stars from Hot Press, RTÉ Lyric FM - Album Of The Week, PLAYIRISH Album of The Week & RTÉ Radio 1 - Recommends playlist. After the album's release, 'Never Say Goodbye' received over 1,500 Irish radio plays reaching an audience of over 3 million listeners.

She has appeared as a regular panelist on Irish television's "The Elaine Show" on Virgin Media One.

In 2022, Parle joined the panel of performers with the National Concert Hall's "Health & Harmony" initiative to deliver performances at dementia care homes throughout Ireland.

Parle is a mentor with Minding Creative Minds - an organisation which offers a free support programme for the Irish creative sector.

In November 2023, she released a new single, Forever in My Mind.

== Discography ==
=== Albums ===
- First Impressions (1993)
- The Bottrell Session's (2003 Unreleased)
- Free (2006)
- The Full Circle (2010)
- Never Say Goodbye (2020)

=== EPs ===
- Roll The Dice (2015)

=== Singles ===
- When I See You Smile (Top 20) (2002)
- More Than A Ghost (Top 30) (2002)
- Failed Romances (Top 30)
- Corporate Culture (Top 30)
- Ghost (Top 10) (2009)
- My Hero – written by Luan Parle and students of Presentation Secondary School Clonmel (Top 10) (2013)
- Day Is Done (2014)
- Roll The Dice (2015)
- You're Not Here (2015)
- Your Love Still Guides My Way – written by Luan Parle and students of Coláiste Chill Mhantáin (Top 10) (2017)
- Give Me Shelter (2017)
- My Something Beautiful (2020)
- Change Your Mind (2020)
- The Ghost of Martha (2020)
- Never Say Goodbye (2020)
- Forever in My Mind (2023)

== Awards ==
- 2007 Meteor Awards - Best Irish Female
- 2007 Irish Tatler Awards - Women of the Year Music
- 2008 Big Buzz Awards - Most Stylish Female
