= 4.35am =

EP by Gemma Hayes
- Released: 9 July 2001
- Recorded: 2000
- Genre: Alternative rock
- Length: n/a
- Label: Source Records
- Producer: Gemma Hayes, Dave Fridmann

Gemma Hayes chronology
4.35am (2001)	Work to a Calm (2001)

4.35am is an EP by Irish singer-songwriter Gemma Hayes. Released in 2001, it was her first official release on the Source Records label.

The track "4.35am" appeared on the soundtrack for the 2006 movie Flicka starring Maria Bello. "Piano Song" features Gemma unaccompanied on piano.

== Track listing ==
All songs written by Gemma Hayes.

1. "Gotta Low"
2. "Making Waves"
3. "Evening Sun"
4. "4.35am"
5. "Piano Song"

== Charts ==
Chart performance for "4.35am"
Chart (2001)	Peak position
Ireland (IRMA)	37
