= The Elders (band) =

American folk rock band

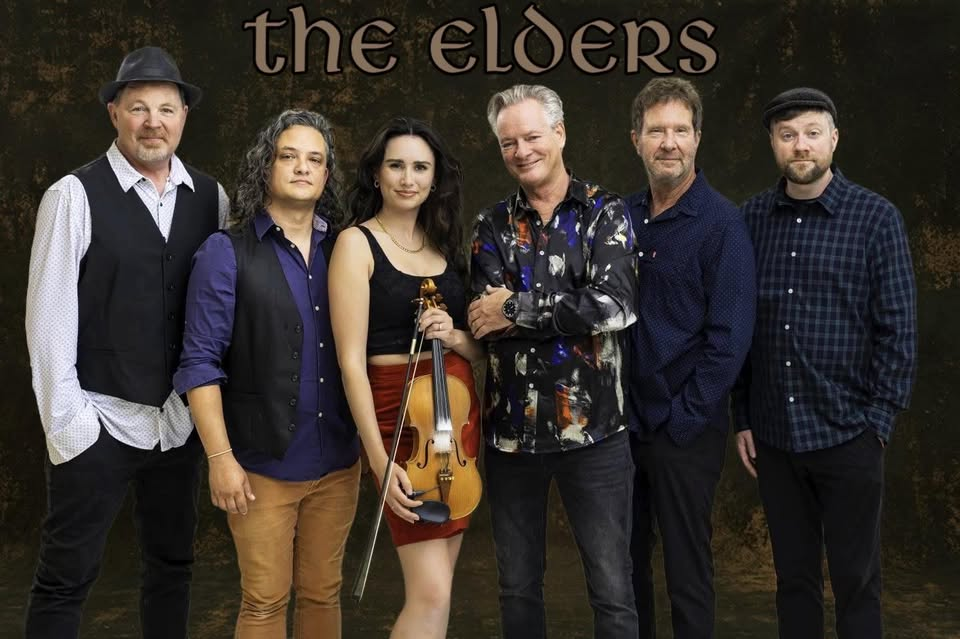
- The Elders 2026 courtesy of Brian Rice

Background information
- Origin: Kansas City, Missouri, United States
- Genres: Irish, Folk rock, Americana, World, Rock
- Years active: 1998–present
- Label: Pub Tone Records
- Members: Ian Byrne; Norm Dahlor; Kian Byrne; Shannon O'Shea; Dan Loftus; Bill Latas
- Website: http://www.eldersmusic.com/

The Elders is a six-piece, internationally touring American folk rock band formed in Kansas City, Missouri.

The band has released ten studio albums, the most recent on August 7th, 2026, "The Spirits and The Sea", "Well Alright Then," The Elders, Pass It on Down, American Wake, Racing the Tide, Gael Day, Wanderin' Life & Times, Story Road, and True, as well as four live albums "The Best Crowd We Ever Had", "Live at the Gem", "Alive and Live in Ireland", "The Elders: Hoolie", and one compilation album, "The Best of The Elders Volume 1" which includes live tracks and an Emmy Award-winning DVD "Evergy & The Elders Light up the Plaza"---a live performance to an audience of 100,000 in their hometown. The Elders are also Telly-Award Winners and inductees into the Kansas Music Hall of Fame. They have toured in the United States, Ireland, and Europe. They also appeared in the 2008 Music Documentary entitled "American Music: OFF THE RECORD; alongside Jackson Browne, Johnny Winter and Les Paul; Dir. Benjamin Meade. Their most recent live concert @Knuckleheads KC was featured on PBS KCPT-TV in 2025 and 2026.

The Elders songs will be featured in an upcoming film called "Guttermuckers" starring Jim Belushi.

== Style ==
The band is known for their Americana and Celtic rock roots that intertwine varying styles, textures and broad harmonies. The band blends socially conscious and vibrant narratives which explore history and life in the United States, Ireland and beyond.

== Career ==
Since forming in 1998, The Elders have released ten studio albums, four live albums, one compilation album and four DVDs. The Elders are fronted by Ian Byrne, a native of Ireland's County Wicklow, founding member Norm Dahlor, on bass, and Kian Byrne, drummer, multi-instrumentalist, born in Dublin, Shannon O'Shea, fiddler, Liam Latas, Guitar, and Dan Loftus on keyboards.

They have played festivals, pubs and theaters across the United States, Ireland and other parts of Europe. The band has performed at festivals in Philadelphia, New York City, Cleveland, Chicago, Milwaukee, Denver, and Dublin, Ohio and others.

The Elders' songs have been played on more than 120 U.S. radio stations and have been featured live on WoodSongs Old-Time Radio Hour. Their "Live at the Gem" concert show was broadcast on more than 100 PBS stations.

In 2019, the band discontinued regular touring.

On September 30, 2020, it was announced that guitarist Steve Phillips died due to pulmonary fibrosis.

The band returned to touring and released "Well Alright Then" in April of 2022 and continue to tour all over the U-S and Ireland.

On August 7, 2026 the band released an EP called "The Spirits and The Sea" which is described as a travelogue of heart which can be heard on all streaming platforms.

== Members ==
=== Current members ===
- Ian Byrne– vocals, bodhrán, percussion
- Norm Dahlor – bass, banjo, guitar, vocals
- Kian Byrne – drums, percussion, mandolin, bass
- Shannon O'Shea - fiddle
- Bill "Liam" Latas -guitar
- Dan Loftus - keyboards

=== Former members ===
- Diana Ladio - fiddle
- Michael Bliss – vocals, bass
- Tommy Dwyer – drums
- Randy Riga – accordion
- Brett Gibson – accordion
- Tommy Sutherland - Drums, Percussion
- Joe Miquelon - keyboards
- Shawn Poores - Drums
- Colin Farrell - fiddle, whistles
- Steve Phillips – guitar, mandolin, vocals
- Brent Hoad - Fiddle, vocals (died 2026)

== Discography ==
- The Elders (2000)
- Pass It on Down (2002)
- American Wake (2004)
- The Best Crowd We Ever Had (2004)
- Live at the Gem (2005)
- Racing the Tide (2006)
- Alive and Live in Ireland (2007)
- Gael Day (2009)
- The Best of The Elders Volume 1 (2010)
- Wanderin' Life & Times (2011)
- "The Elders: Hoolie" (2012)
- "Story Road" (2014)
- "True" (2017)
- “Well Alright Then” (2022)
- "The Spirits and The Sea" (2026)

== Filmography ==
- "Live at the Gem" (2005)
- "Alive and Live In Ireland" (2007)
- "American Music: OFF THE RECORD" (2008)
- "The Elders: Hoolie" (2012)
- "Live at The Uptown Theater" (2014)
- “The Elders Last Tour – Going to Arklow” (2019) Documentary, Emmy-nominated
- "Evergy & The Elders Light up the Plaza" (2020) Emmy Winner
- "Guttermuckers" starring Jim Belushi (2026)
