= Claire Sproule =

Irish singer

Claire Sproule (born 9 April 1984) is a singer-songwriter from County Donegal, Ireland.

She was born in Derry, Northern Ireland, into a musical family; her uncle is Dáithí Sproule of Altan. After playing the clarinet for some time, she showed an interest in guitar, having been brought up listening to Tom Waits, Joni Mitchell and Elvis Costello in Derry and Donegal. At the age of 14 she started writing her own songs.

After leaving school, she began by performing Eva Cassidy songs in local pubs in Donegal, before starting to sing her own songs. She made a rough demo tape which was sent to both the Parlophone and Blue Note record labels, who jointly offered her a recording deal within a week — Parlophone publishing in Europe and Blue Note in the United States. Her self-titled debut album, Claire Sproule was released on Parlophone on 10 October 2005. The album was produced by Stewart Levine, and included top musicians such as Pino Palladino. The album consists of tracks which Sproule wrote between the ages of 17 and 19, and attracted widespread attention.

Following the release of her first album, Sproule played numerous Irish television and radio shows, including the BBC Northern Ireland's An Stuif Ceart, and RTÉ's Other Voices and The Late Late Show. Her second album, entitled Shades of Night, was released in May 2008.

Sproule toured with Paulo Nutini on his first album UK tour and has supported the likes of Al Green, playing in the Royal Albert Hall, and Irish artist Mary Black.

== Discography ==
Albums

- Claire Sproule (10 October 2005)
- Shades of Night (May 2008)

Singles

- "Wondering" (13 March 2006)
- "Flame (31 July 2006)
