= Blink (band) =

Irish pop rock band

- Origin: Dublin, Ireland
- Genres: Alternative rock; dream pop; pop rock
- Years active: 1991–2004; 2014–present
- Labels: EMI; Parlophone; Paradigm; Serenes; Garage
- Members: Dermot Lambert; Robbie Sexton; Brian McLoughlin; Barry Campbell

Blink are a pop rock band from Ireland. Known for their melancholy humour, they have released four albums since their inception in the early 1990s.

Their 1994 debut album, A Map of the Universe by Blink, was a Top Ten in the Irish album charts and their second album, 1998's The End is High, was a Billboard album of the week upon release.

Their 2004 album Deep Inside the Sound of Sadness, was nominated for Irish Album of the Year at the 2005 Meteor Music Awards, losing out to Snow Patrol for their album Final Straw.

The band are also notable for being the first band pictured on a telephone card. A run of 202,000 were produced in 1993. This included a smaller limited run of 2000 cards, which were used as membership cards for the band's fan club. All the cards read 'Limited Edition' despite being produced in great quantities.

The band's name comes from the song "Iceblink Luck" by the Cocteau Twins, a favourite song of drummer Barry Campbell.

San Diego–based pop-punk band Blink-182 originally also performed under the name Blink, even releasing several demos and their debut studio album, Cheshire Cat, under this name, but the threat of a legal dispute with the Irish band resulted in their name change to Blink-182. After the name change, Blink-182 re-released Cheshire Cat under their current moniker.

== Biography ==
Blink was formed in the early 1990s by vocalist and guitarist Dermot Lambert, keyboardist Robbie Sexton, bassist Brian McLoughlin and drummer Barry Campbell. The band's inclusion on a CD that circulated at a trade festival in New York generated positive reviews, which led to the band signing with British label EMI for their debut release.

Four months after playing their debut gig in 1992, Blink found themselves in a recording studio working with producers John O'Neill, Gil Norton and Steve Hillage on material that would make up their first record, A Map of the Universe by Blink, released in August 1994. The first two singles from the album, "Going to Nepal" and "Happy Day", reached the Top 20 in the Irish charts, with the third and final single, "It's Not My Fault", debuting at No. 8. Following the record's release, Parlophone and EMI launched the imprint Lime Records in the US, allowing them to take Blink stateside, where they garnered college and mainstream radio airplay and played live shows.

After spending some time playing shows and promoting the band in the US they began receiving requests from Parlophone to return to the studio and begin work on a second album, so they returned to the UK to start writing and recording. The delay in production of new material resulted in the band receiving a letter in April 1996, informing them that the label had decided to terminate the contract.

Offers of shows and support slots with bands they had met in the US had left the band feeling reluctant to return to the UK to produce a new record. The termination of their contract with Parlophone allowed them to return to America and in 1997 the band signed with the now defunct Paradigm Records. Blink began recording their second album, The End Is High, releasing it in the US in March 1998. Billboard magazine named the album their album of the week upon its release. It went on to sell 90,000 copies and the band began receiving offers for support slots on larger tours. Between 1999 and 2004 Blink opened shows for Mercury Rev, Moby, Lloyd Cole, The Cardigans, Mark Geary and Blink-182, the very same band whose name they forced to amend under threat of legal action.

Despite Paradigm Records closing its doors, Blink and producer Howie Beno decided to proceed with plans for a third album, which would eventually become 2004's Deep Inside the Sound of Sadness. American singer-songwriter and producer Wendy Starland contributed vocals to the track "Don't You Rollerblade in Nashville Tennessee?"

In June 2013, lead singer and guitarist Dermot Lambert released his debut solo album, Tiny, featuring the singles "Twinkle Twinkle Satellite", "Hey Sean" and "Fade Into the Morning Sun".

In December 2015 the band's manager, Aiden Lambert, died after a battle with cancer. Lambert was a former staff member at the Irish magazines Hot Press and The Phoenix before managing Blink. There was a large turnout for his funeral, which included tributes from many of his former colleagues in the Irish music and media industries.

== Albums ==
- A Map of the Universe by Blink (1994)
- The End Is High (1998)
- Deep Inside the Sound of Sadness (2004)
- Catch That Moment – The Best of Blink (2014 Garage Records)
- A Glitch In The Matrix (2021 – Garage Records)

== Singles ==
- "A Planet Made of Rain" (Paradigm)
- "Cello" (Lime Records/Parlophone)
- "Dead Little Bird" (Paradigm)
- "Going to Nepal" (Lime Records/Parlophone)
- "Happy Day" (Lime Records/Parlophone)
- "Is God Really Groovy?" (Serene)
- "It's Not My Fault"
- "The Luckiest Man Alive" (Paradigm)
- "The Tiny Magic Indian" (Serene)
- "To Go"
- "Would You Kill for Love?" (Paradigm)
- "Baby You Broke My Heart But You Know That I Don't Hate You for It" (2000) (Serene Records)
- "Happy Christmas 22 (I Still Miss You)"
- "Every Day is a Black Day from Today" (2020)
- "We Robbed a Bank in Brazil and Got Away with It" (2021)
