= Mundy =

Irish singer-songwriter

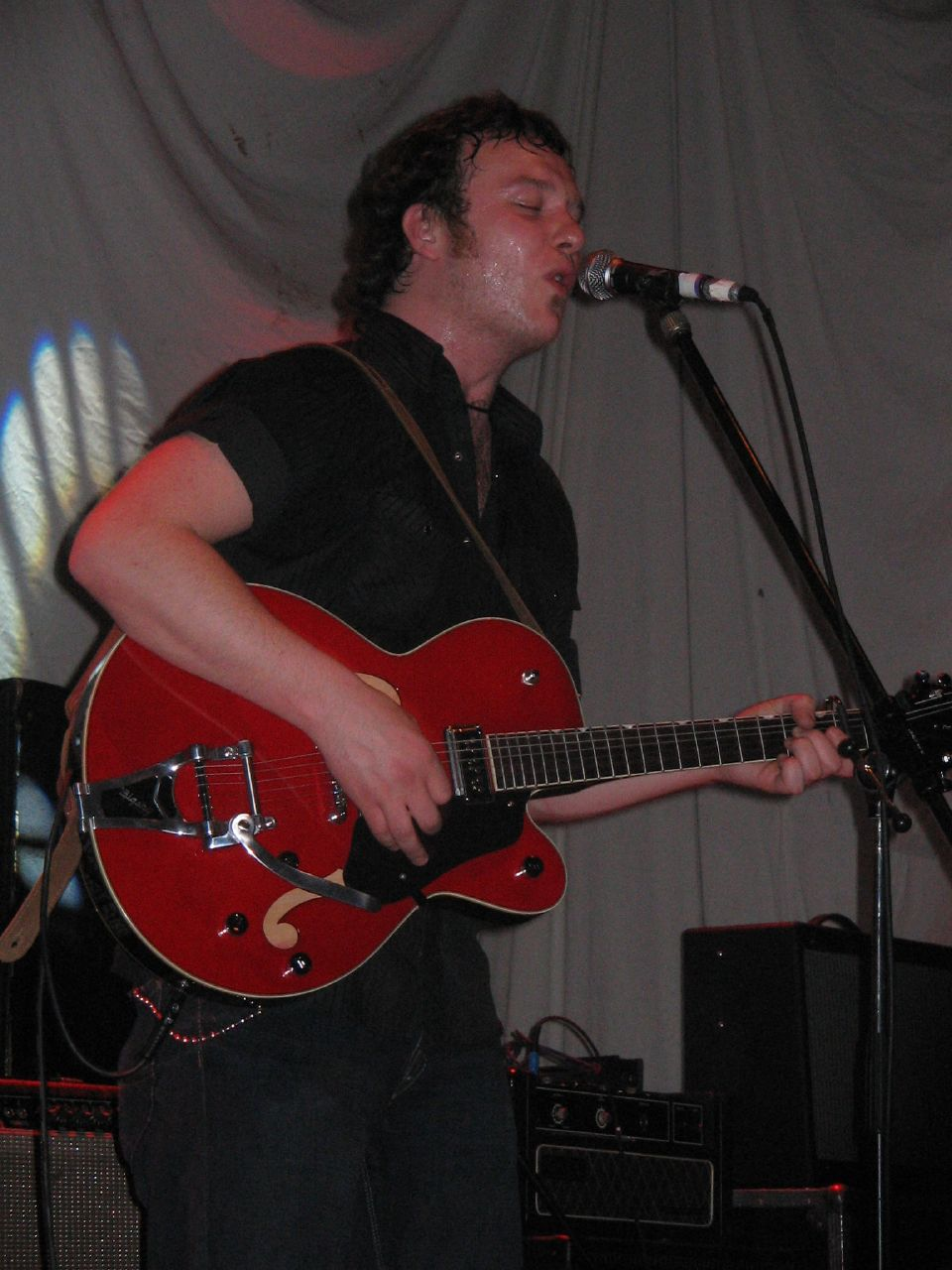
- Mundy at a charity event, 2005

Background information
- Born: Edmond Enright; 19 May 1975 (age 51); Birr, County Offaly, Ireland
- Genres: Folk
- Occupation: Singer
- Labels: Epic Records (Sony BMG) (until 2000); Camcor Records
- Website: www.mundy.ie

Edmond Enright (born 19 May 1975), known professionally as Mundy, is an Irish singer-songwriter and founder of the independent record label Camcor Records.

== Biography ==
He released his debut album Jelly Legs in 1996 on the Epic Records label. The album included the song "To You I Bestow", which was featured on the best-selling soundtrack to Baz Luhrmann's film adaptation Romeo + Juliet.

In 2000, Mundy was dropped by Epic while working on his second album, The Moon is a Bullethole, which was about to be recorded. Although a four-track EP of that title was released, much of the material for the canceled album was eventually incorporated into 24 Star Hotel, Mundy's 2002 album.

24 Star Hotel was released on Camcor Records, a label Mundy himself set up, primarily funded by his royalties from the Romeo and Juliet soundtrack. Camcor Records is named for the River Camcor, a popular fishing spot, which runs through the town of Birr, County Offaly. The album contained the song "July", an ode to the joys of the Irish summer, which gained heavy airplay throughout the summer months and is, for Irish audiences at least, Mundy's signature tune. Along with "July", the album contained "Mexico", and with both receiving extensive radio airplay (and Mundy making some huge Irish festival appearances), 24 Star Hotel has gone-on to be certified 3× platinum in Ireland. He later was featured with Lucinda Williams when she performed in the country.

In 2003, Mundy also contributed to Afro Celt Sound System's album Seed, as well as to Even Better than the Real Thing Vol. 1, with a cover version of the Shakira song Whenever, Wherever, in which the two words in the title are reversed.

In May 2004, Mundy released his third album, Raining Down Arrows, recorded with producer Mark Addison at The Aerie studio in Austin, Texas. It entered the Irish Albums Chart at No. 1, the record having since gone platinum. He toured the UK with songwriting legend Jimmy Webb, and continued to win-over Irish audiences whilst making UK appearances with Richard Hawley, and gaining Irish support slots with The White Stripes and Oasis.

In 2006, Mundy recorded a live album and DVD called Live & Confusion at Vicar Street, Dublin. It contains all of his best-known songs such as "Gin & Tonic Sky", "Mexico", "July", "To You I Bestow", "By Her Side" and "Love & Confusion". The album also contained an encore of "Galway Girl", a Steve Earle-penned song that Clare accordionist Sharon Shannon had recorded with the author years before. The live version became a download hit in Ireland, and eventually a studio version was released, after it was popularised in a television and radio advertising campaign for Bulmer's cider. The studio version of the track reached number 1 in the Irish Singles Chart in April 2008 and stayed there for five weeks. It became the biggest single in Ireland two years in a row in 2007 and 2008. Mundy also recorded an Irish language version of the track, entitled Cailín na Gaillimhe, for Ceol '08, an Irish language compilation album released in 2008 to raise money for several Irish charities. Two years before, Mundy recorded an Irish-language version of his song "Mexico", entitled "Meicsiceo" for Ceol '06. Ceol '06 reached the Top 10 in the Irish Album Chart.

In 2008 Mundy continually guested with Sharon Shannon's Big Band alongside Damien Dempsey and Shane MacGowan, turning up at The Glastonbury Festival as well as touring Ireland and the UK.

In 2009 Mundy recorded his fourth studio album, Strawberry Blood, with Irish producer Joe Chester, and mixed a number of tracks with UK producer Andy Bradfield. The album featured contributions from Shane MacGowan and Gemma Hayes and was released worldwide on iTunes with a bonus download video. He guested with Nina Persson's A Camp project at the academy in Dublin, and in 2009 saw he tour Ireland, Australia, and the UK. The album went into the Irish charts at No.14. During the sessions for Strawberry Blood, Mundy recorded several cover versions with Joe Chester, including Bob Dylan's Buckets Of Rain, Neil Young's Ohio and Simon and Garfunkel's Kathy's Song. These cover versions went on to be released on the follow-up, 2011's Shuffle.

== Camcor Records ==
Camcor Records is an independent record label founded by Mundy after he departed from Epic Records (Sony BMG) in 2000, four years after his first album. The company takes its name from the Camcor River, which flows through Mundy's hometown of Birr, County Offaly, Ireland. It is sometimes listed as "Camcor Recording" in industry publications.

Mundy has released three albums on the label: his second album, 24-Star Hotel, which has sold more than 25,000 copies in Ireland; his third album, the platinum-selling Raining Down Arrows; and more recently the live album Live & Confusion.

== Discography ==
Studio albums

- Jelly Legs (1996)
- 24 Star Hotel (2002)
- Raining Down Arrows (2004)
- Strawberry Blood (2009)
- Shuffle (2011)
- Mundy (2015)

Live albums

- Live & Confusion (2006)
- Live at Oxegen 2008 (2011)
