= Ross Breen =

Canada international rugby union player (born 1956)

- Born: 11 June 1956 (age 70) Mississauga, Ontario, Canada

Rugby union career
International career
Years	Team	Apps	(Points)
1983–1987	Canada	2	(0)

Ross Breen (born 11 June 1956) is a Canadian former rugby union player. He played in two matches for the Canada national rugby union team in 1983 and 1987, including one match at the 1987 Rugby World Cup.
