= Senakah =

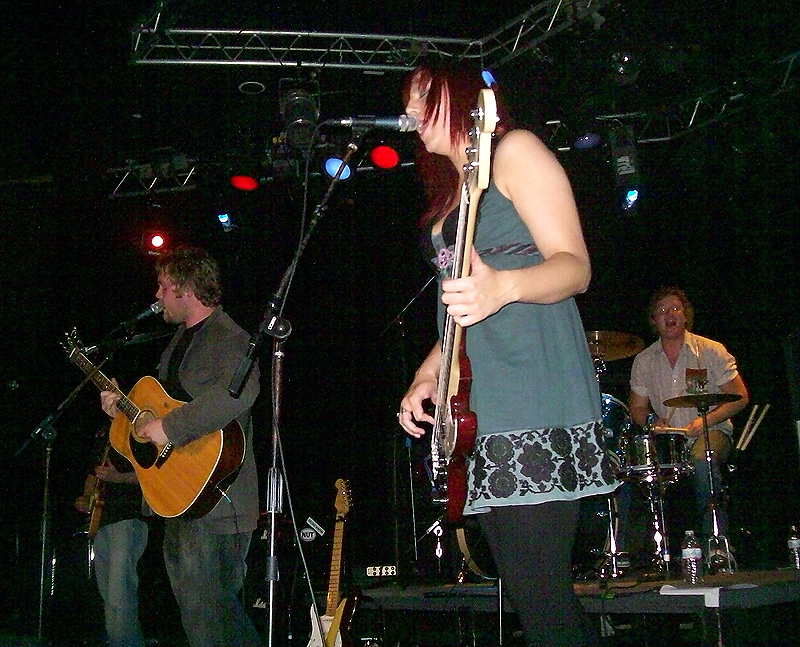

Background information
- Origin: Limerick, Ireland
- Genres: Hard rock, alternative rock
- Years active: 2005 – present
- Label: West Pole Music
- Members: Rob Hope; Yvonne Conaty; Brendan O'Gorman; Daragh O'Loughlain
- Past members: Chris Griffis (2009–2010)

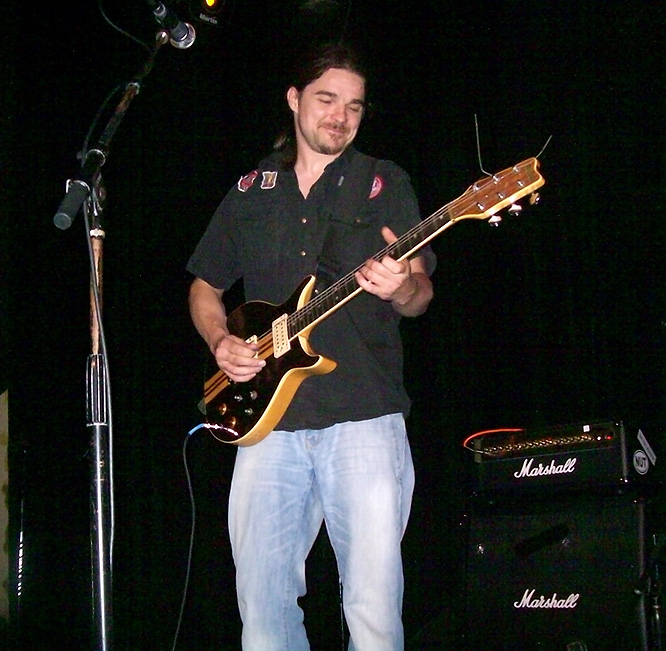
Senakah guitarist Brendan O'Gorman performing at the Whisky a Go Go

Senakah (formerly Seneca) are an Indie/alternative rock band from Limerick, Ireland. Their debut album, Sweeter than Bourbon, produced the single "Clarity", which broke into the Ireland Top 20. Senakah's 2008 American debut was met with positive reviews, and spawned a North American tour in 2008. In 2009 the band spent three months in the United States before embarking on the European leg of their tour.

== Style ==
Senakah incorporates heavy guitar influence along with harmonic vocals and stringed instruments such as the cello and viola. Lead singer Rob Hope has been compared to "Eddie Vedder on his best day."

Sweeter than Bourbon, the debut studio album from the band, deals with Ireland's social issues including domestic violence which is evidenced by the lyrics in their single "Clarity".

== Reception ==
Senakah has been met with positive reception in Europe and North America.

The Second Supper described the band's live performance thus: "No song was vestigial, no member’s contribution was unimportant or repetitive. The spectrum-running creed was adhered to, and it paid off big."

The band were originally named 'Seneca', but they reported they had to change their name to 'Senakah' to avoid a trademark conflict.

== Discography ==
- Sweeter than Bourbon (2008)
- Human Relations (2013)
