= Lir (band) =

Irish rock band

LiR
- Origin: Dublin, Ireland
- Genres: Rock, Alternative
- Years active: Early 90s to present
- Labels: Velo, W.A.R.?, 1969
- Members: Ronan Byrne; Dave McGuinness; Colm Quearney; Robert Malone; John Boyle
- Past members: Craig Hutchinson; David Hopkins

Lir, stylized on album covers as LiR, are a rock band formed in the late 1980s in Dublin, Ireland.

== History ==
The band became known during the 1990s through their live performances in Dublin. Attention from major labels in the early portion of their career led some critics to draw comparisons to U2. The band signed with U.S. label What Are Records? in 1993, which pushed for the band's success in the US through an intensive touring schedule that had the band playing in North America nine months out of the year. Lir continued on this schedule from 1993 to 1997, before conflicts with their management led to a long hiatus.

It would be 13 years before the band's next full-length release, Lir Live, under the independent label 1969 Records.

A documentary on the band, directed by Shimmy Marcus and entitled "Good Cake Bad Cake: The Story of LIR" was released in 2011, but was pulled from the Dublin International Film Festival due to a legal dispute between the band and their former management.

The band still reconvenes annually to play shows in and around Dublin.

== Discography ==
- All Machines Hum in A - 1992
- Magico Magico! (Velo Records - Ireland + EU only) - 1993
- Magico Magico! (What Are Records? - US release) - 1994
- Nest (What Are Records? - US release) - 1995
- This Appeared - EP (Velo Records - Ireland + EU only) - 1995
- 7000 Apes 600 - EP (Velo Records - Ireland + EU only) - 1997
- I Went Down: Music from the original motion picture soundtrack (Prophecy Ent.) - 1997
- 06/93 Acoustic Sessions (What Are Records? - US Release) - 2006
- Lir Live (1969 Records - UK only) - 2008
