= Gemma Hayes =

Irish musician (born 1977)

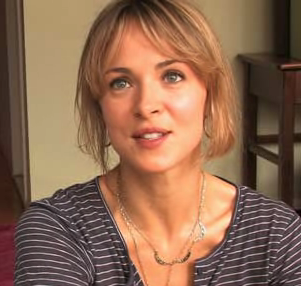
- Hayes in 2008.

Background information
- Born: Gemma Claire Hayes; 11 August 1977 (age 49); Ballyporeen, County Tipperary, Ireland
- Genres: Alternative rock, indie rock, folk
- Occupations: Singer, Songwriter, Producer
- Instruments: Vocals, guitar, piano, harmonica
- Years active: 2000–present
- Labels: Source (2001–2005); Second Motion (2008–2011); Fullfill Music (2012); Gemma Hayes Music t/a Chasing Dragons (2008–present), Townsend Music & PIAS(2023-present))
- Website: Official website

Gemma Hayes (born 11 August 1977) is an Irish musician, singer-songwriter and composer. Primarily known as a vocalist and guitarist, she is also proficient with a wide range of instruments, including the piano and the harmonica. She is also a member of The Cake Sale, Printer Clips and Trio (with Lisa Hannigan and Paul Noonan).

Her material has drawn comparisons to My Bloody Valentine, Neil Young and Joni Mitchell.

== Early life ==
Hayes grew up in Ballyporeen, County Tipperary with her parents and seven other siblings. She was surrounded by music from an early age heavily influenced by her siblings and her father who was a keyboardist in a local band. Hayes would later move to County Limerick to attend boarding school. By this time, Hayes was proficient at piano and found that the music used to counter the boredom of living in a small village. She would later move to Dublin City to attend UCD to study sociology, psychology and history. Hayes soon dropped out of university to concentrate on her music and to gig at music venues across the city. This was subsidised by working part-time in a laundrette.

== Music career ==
=== EPs and Night on My Side: 2001–2003 ===
Hayes' music career catapulted upon signing a recording contract with French independent record label, Source Records in 2001. Under this label she would release her first EP 4.35am and its follow up Work to a Calm. By 2002 her debut album Night on my Side was released. This release received critical acclaim resulting in her winning Best Female Artist at the Hot Press Awards 2002 and later the album was nominated for Best Album at the 2003 Mercury Prize. Hayes toured Europe and the US extensively upon the album's release performing at high profiled festivals such as Ireland's Witnness festival and Montreux Jazz Festival 2002 in Switzerland. After touring Night on my Side Hayes took two years out from the music industry; "All I do know is that I didn't want to listen to music at all. I stopped listening to the radio. It was like I'd overdosed on music". She did however find the time to record a cover of "Lay Lady Lay" with Magnet. This version appeared in the 2005 film Mr. & Mrs. Smith.

=== The Roads Don't Love You: 2004–2006 ===
In 2004, Hayes moved from Dublin to Los Angeles. By late 2005, Hayes returned with her more upbeat second album, The Roads Don't Love You, and picked up the Best Irish Female Artist award at the 2006 Meteor Ireland Music Awards while completing a small tour of Ireland and the United Kingdom. Shortly after this she parted ways with Source Records as its parent company EMI-Virgin decided to overhaul its line-up of artists and bands. During this time Hayes co-wrote the song "Hazy" with Adam Duritz. Hayes toured Ireland, the UK and US during the promotion of the album.

=== The Hollow of Morning and Oliver EP: 2006–2009 ===
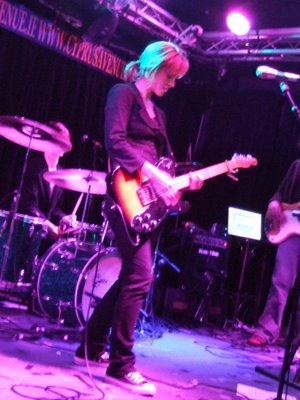
Gemma Hayes kicking off The Hollow of Morning tour at Cyprus Avenue, Cork City 22 April 2008

On 14 August 2006 Hayes announced she had begun work on her third album in the Black Box Studios in France and produced by her former guitarist, David Odlum. Hayes posted demos of "Out of Our Hands", "Home", and "This Is What You Do" on her MySpace during the recording process. Hayes later confirmed the name of her third album The Hollow of Morning. The album was independently released through her own label GH Music and co-financed by an investor. The album was released in Ireland on 2 May 2008 debuting in the Irish Albums Chart at number 12. Following its release in Ireland, Hayes signed a distribution deal with US label Second Motion the album was released in the US on 30 September 2008. During her 2008 'The Hollow of Morning' tour in the UK, Hayes announced she was considering recording an acoustic album for release by year's end. During promotional work in Ireland during summer 2008, Hayes confirmed she would start recording her fourth album in August.

To support the album she put together a touring band featuring Joe Chester on guitar, Binzer Brennan on drums and Karl Odlum on bass. This lineup would go on to tour extensively in Ireland, the UK as well as some dates opening for My Bloody Valentine in the United States, including at All Tomorrow's Parties in upstate New York. Gemma and Joe would continue touring as a duo until April 2010. Hayes was nominated for "Best Irish Female" at the 2009 Meteor Ireland Music Awards (the award went to Imelda May). On 13 February 2009 the music video for the song "Home" debuted on MySpace. On 19 February 2009 she performed (with Joe Chester) at the Oscar Wilde party in Los Angeles. The annual event takes place days before the Oscars, and celebrates the best of Irish popular culture.

On 22 February 2009, it was confirmed on her website she would release a new EP titled Oliver and available from 9 March 2009. The EP's release was delayed as confirmed on her MySpace on 9 March. To make up for the delay in release a new track called "Ghost" was streamed on the website. On 13 March 2009 Oliver was made available through iTunes. On 14 April 2009 Hayes announced she had begun on new material for the next album.

On 3 September 2009, Hayes performed at the 2012 stage at the 2009 Århus Festival. Her set-list featured new songs "Waiting for You" and "Shock to the System". On 20 October 2009, she confirmed that she was recording new material in France in the Blackbox studios.

On 19 November 2009, she began a short European tour with performances in Austria, Ireland, and the United Kingdom. During these tour dates Hayes played new songs including "Tokyo", "Waiting for You" and "Shock to the System". At her gig in Cork on 3 December, she performed a cover of Kate Bush's "Cloudbusting". On 22 December 2009, Hayes released her cover of "Cloudbusting" for free from her website.

In March 2010, Hayes featured on Ceol '10, a special album in the Irish language. She previously appeared on Ceol 2007. On the Ceol '10 album, Hayes' song "Rith me go Crich" appeared alongside Bell X1, Kila and The Walls.

=== Let It Break: 2010–2011 ===
Hayes hinted a possible September 2010 release for her fourth album, but, by October 2010, Hayes confirmed the album's delayed release until 2011 as she began to rework some tracks. During this time Hayes returned to live performances where she launched her autumn tour in Cork City, Ireland where she performed new tracks "Noise", "Hurricane" and "Beside Me".

During the recording process Hayes took time out between recording sessions and live performances to write material for independent movie Janie Jones, by directed by David M. Rosenthal. Three of Hayes' tracks; "Just a Game", "Fight for Me" and "Hurricane" featured in the film. This soundtrack was later released on 11 October 2011. It also features the studio version of "Waiting for You" which she played as a promo track and on her tours throughout 2010 and 2011.

On 13 February 2011, Hayes confirmed on RTÉ Radio 1's Today with Pat Kenny her fourth studio album would be released by May 2011 and this coincided with a tour across Ireland. Hayes confirmed on her official website the fourth album Let It Break was due for May release with a single due earlier as recording in Ireland and France neared completion. Gemma confirmed 'Shock to the System' will appear on the album. On 15 March 2011, she confirmed that a track called "Noise" will feature on the album. The album, Let It Break, released on 27 May 2011 in Ireland.

During promotion of 'Let It Break', Hayes confirmed she had written two songs for Michael Uppendahl (director of US TV series Mad Men, Weeds, and Becker) for a forthcoming film directed by him.

=== "Wicked Game" single and Chasing Sparks: 2012 ===
On 16 February 2012, Hayes revealed in an interview with Evening Echo's 'Downtown', she recorded a cover version of Chris Isaak's "Wicked Game" for US Teen drama Pretty Little Liars, the song featured throughout her 2012 tour playlist. On 1 March 2012, gemmahayes.com confirmed her cover of "Wicked Game" will appear on Pretty Little Liars on 12 March and will be available to download as a single.

Paul Noonan of Bell X1 confirmed Hayes would appear on his solo debut album Noonan has previously worked on Hayes' previous albums. This album was released in May 2014, where Hayes provides vocals on 'The Snowman'.

In June 2012, Hayes announced she began work on writing new tracks and she planned to move to Los Angeles. This move was later shelved where she continued to reside in Dublin.

On 30 June 2012, Hayes played the Concert At Sea festival in The Netherlands. On 15 July 2012, new songs recorded by Hayes appeared on iTunes through the Velvet Ear Collection. These new tracks included "All The Kids Go" which previously appeared on US TV show Dance Moms, "Jet" a demo version of what became "There's Only Love" featured on Let It Break album and other tracks including "Devastated" and "Simple Life" also featured. "Simple Life" proved to be the most popular of the tracks peaking in the Irish iTunes chart at number 35 upon its debut on the chart.

On 9 August 2012, Hayes confirmed through e-mail to fans she continued to work on new material. She also revealed she was working with David Odlum on his side-project and she also hinted at the release of a live album due for 2013 (this release was later postponed). Hayes confirmed a new tour dates for both Ireland and the UK beginning in October 2012.

In September 2012, she featured in a campaign called "30 Songs / 30 Days" to support Half the Sky: Turning Oppression into Opportunity for Women Worldwide, a multi-platform media project inspired by Nicholas Kristof and Sheryl WuDunn's book.

On 16 November 2012, SPAR Ireland confirmed via their official Facebook page their 2012 Christmas advertisement, featuring a Christmas themed track performed by Hayes and Jape. On 21 November 2012, Hayes confirmed she would record her upcoming gig in Dublin's Olympia on 9 December to release it as a live album in early 2013. On 22 April 2013 Hayes confirmed through an email to fans she hoped to release a special limited vinyl featuring live performances gathered at some of her tour dates. Each limited edition vinyl will be numbered and signed by the artist herself. She also confirmed to have written some new songs and is expected to go into the studio soon to record them for the forthcoming LP.

Chasing Sparks was the name given for a future EP release which has since been postponed. It was expected to be released as a download in mid-December 2012. On 21 November 2012, she confirmed the release of the EP. It was confirmed on 28 November 2012 that her version of Cloudbusting was expected to appear on the EP. It was confirmed on 23 December 2012 that a cover of Sparklehorse' 'Beautiful Widow' was to feature on the EP with vocals from Jack Savoretti.

=== Night & Day, Bones + Longing: 2013–2019 ===
On 30 April 2013, Hayes confirmed she had begun recording her fifth studio album in France. In August 2013, Hayes launched her Pledge Music campaign which offered fans the opportunity to support and assist the production of her fifth studio album.

On 16 August 2013, on her new official website Hayes provided more details about the PledgeMusic campaign. Here Hayes revealed the title of the planned live vinyl release 'Night & Day'.

On 21 September 2013 it was confirmed that Hayes' PledgeMusic campaign was completed. On 3 December 2013 Hayes was interviewed by Hot Press magazine where she discussed the album's recording moving to the UK, after demos and recordings set in France and Dublin.

On 10 April 2014, Hayes revealed through her Facebook page three titles of new songs to feature on the album due in the summer. These tracks include "To Be Your Honey", "Palomino" and "Making My Way Back". A 15-second live recording of "Be Your Honey" was also revealed. Hayes also confirmed mixing and mastering will take place in France in the coming month as Hayes finishes recording in London. In April 2014, Hayes performed a number of UK gigs prior to the forthcoming fifth studio album. These gigs were part of her Pledge Music campaign. Hayes is expected to tour the rest of Europe in the fall following the release of her new album due late summer 2014.

On 9 July 2014 David Odlum (producer of Bones+Longing) confirmed the album was mixed and mastered. On 29 July 2014 Hayes' manager Simon Long confirmed a photoshoot took place to promote the forthcoming album release. On 1 August 2014 Hayes confirmed through her Pledge Music page her fifth studio album is titled Bones + Longing.

On 23 August 2014, Hayes performed alongside Paul Noonan as part of Printer Clips on RTÉ's Saturday Night with Miriam. Both artists performed 'The Snowman'. Hayes also confirmed her support of Printer Clips across Ireland in December 2014.

On 14 November Bones+Longing was released in Ireland, with a release in the UK & North American on 17 November. It received a wider international release in on 2 March 2015 and 6 March 2015 in German speaking territories.

She is the featured vocalist on "Counting Down The Days" by Above & Beyond which is the fourth single from their album, We Are All We Need.

In March 2015 she was briefly reunited with Joe Chester for some filmed promotional appearances in France and Ireland, including RTE's The Works, TG4's Imeall and appearances on RTL 2 and Le Bruit des Graviers in Paris, playing versions of Shock to my System, Wicked Game, Out of our Hands and To Be Your Honey.

In late 2015, Hayes confirmed she began writing some new tracks and hoped to release some new material in the coming months.

In 2016, Hayes appeared as part of Starboard Home; a compilation featuring tracks by Irish artists for the Ireland 2016 Centenary Programme. "Caught In The Rapids" illustrated Hayes describing the relationship between rivers and city life, the song is written about the River Liffey in Dublin. Teaming up with many other Irish artists she performed at the Starboard Home event on June 22, 2016, in Dublin.

On February 2, 2019, Hayes performed at a special event hosted at the Irish Embassy in London which celebrated Irish women and their contribution to arts and Irish culture.

=== Blind Faith: 2020–present ===
On 11 July 2020, Gemma Hayes announced via Twitter her initial intention to release two or three new songs in the autumn of 2020. However, these plans did not materialize.

Commencing from September 2020, Hayes initiated work on her sixth album, collaborating with some of the producers and musicians from her previous album, "Night on My Side".

On 9 April 2021, Hayes shared snippets of new material during the recording process of her upcoming album.

Originally slated for an autumn 2021 release, the album's launch was postponed until late 2024 due to ongoing recording and COVID-19 restrictions in Ireland. The recording sessions took place between 2021 and late 2023 between West Cork and Dublin, with David Odlum serving as the producer.

Throughout the summer of 2022, Hayes staged several live performances in Ireland, with additional shows for the UK in 2023 and a full UK tour in spring 2023. Turning Pirate initially announced that the first single from her new album would be "A Reminder of Another", but it was later confirmed that "High & Low" would be released as the first single on 23 June 2023.

Prior to her sixth studio album release Blind Faith, Hayes continued to release singles throughout 2024 including "Feed the Flames" on 25 January and "Hardwired" on 10 May, with a fourth single, "Another Love" scheduled for release in August 2024.

The album's release will be preceded by spring/summer tour of Ireland and a UK tour in September 2024. D2C+ has also confirmed the release of Gemma's back catalogue, with specific dates yet to be determined.

On 2 July 2024, the release date for Hayes's sixth studio album, Blind Faith, was confirmed for 27 September 2024. The artwork and track listing were revealed on July 23, 2024.

== Personal life ==
Following a stint living in Los Angeles, Hayes returned to Dublin. In November 2013 Hayes moved to London, intent on commuting between Ireland and the United Kingdom regularly. On 6 February 2014, Hayes confirmed she gave birth to a baby boy in January 2014. In August 2014, Hayes married Stuart Musgrave. In May 2016, Hayes gave birth to her second child.

In 2020, Hayes moved back to Ireland, where she resides in West Cork.

== In media ==
- Hayes was on the Ceol '07 album, which was released on 2 March 2007, singing "Rith Mé Go Crích", an Irish language version of "Ran For Miles", which originally appeared on Night on my Side. Other Irish artists who appeared included Bell X1 and Paddy Casey. The track "Rith Mé Go Crích" reappeared on Ceol '10 which was released in 2010.
- She appeared on the cover of the June 2008 edition of State magazine.
- "4:35am" appeared in the 2006 film, Flicka.
- She dueted with Julian Lennon on "Faithful" from his album Photograph Smile.

== Discography ==
Studio albums

- Night on My Side (2002)
- The Roads Don't Love You (2005)
- The Hollow of Morning (2008)
- Let It Break (2011)
- Bones + Longing (2014)
- Blind Faith (2024)

== Awards ==
- 2002 – Best Female Artist – Hot Press Awards – Winner
- 2002 – Mercury Prize – Nomination
- 2003 – Irish Tatler Woman of the Year Music Award
- 2006 – Best Irish Female Artist – Meteor Ireland Music Awards – Winner
- 2009 – Best Irish Female Artist – Meteor Ireland Music Awards – Nomination
- 2009 – Best Solo Female – Irish Music Television: Video Music Awards – Home (Video) – Nomination
- 2012 – Best Live Female Irish Artist of 2012 by MTV Ireland

== See also ==
- The Cake Sale
- Printer Clips
- List of singer-songwriters
- List of artists who have released Irish language songs
- List of Irish people
