= Lisa Hannigan discography =

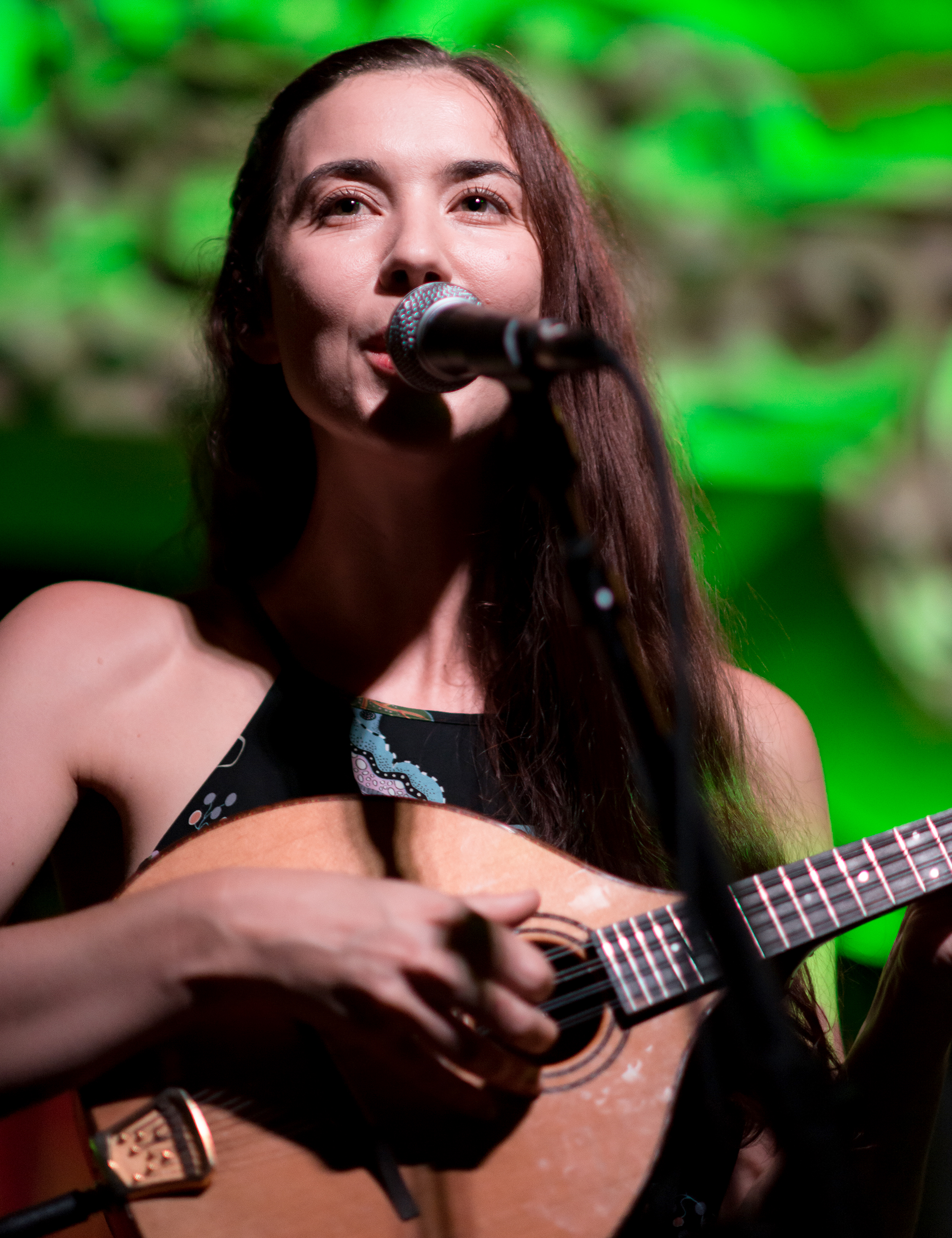
- Lisa Hannigan in 2017
- Studio albums: 3
- Singles: 12

The discography of Lisa Hannigan includes her many side projects and collaborations with a number of other musicians and her solo career, which currently consists of three albums and 12 singles. Hannigan is a multi-instrumentalist who can play electric guitar, bass guitar, Harmonium, melodica, banjo, thumb piano, mandolin, ukulele, glockenspiel and drums as well as being a talented vocalist. She began contributing backing vocals to Damien Rice's band in Dublin in 2001 and toured with him across Europe and North America. Rice dismissed her at Munich, Germany in 2007, and in 2008 she released her debut solo album, titled Sea Sew. Sea Sew has been nominated for the Choice Music Prize and led to Hannigan receiving two nominations at the 2009 Meteor Awards.

Hannigan has also been involved in numerous side projects. She provided backing vocals on one track from Mic Christopher's Skylarkin' album which was finished by Christopher's friends after his death in 2001. She performs three tracks which feature on the soundtrack of the film Goldfish Memory alongside Damien Rice, had a UK hit with the Burmese protest song "Unplayed Piano" and she also features on the albums Burn the Maps by The Frames and Not Fade Away by David Kitt. The singer also worked on self-titled album of The Cake Sale project, a 2007 Oxfam collaboration by mainly Irish musicians, on which she provided vocals on three tracks, including the "Some Surprise" duet with Gary Lightbody, which later featured on the U.S. television series Grey's Anatomy.

Hannigan has performed a number of covers, including "Get the Party Started" by P!nk, which featured as a duet with Damien Rice on Even Better Than the Real Thing Vol. 1 a charity compilation CD released in Ireland in 2003 and "Upside Down" by Diana Ross, which featured on the 2008 charity album Even Better Than the Disco Thing. She also contributed to the 2009 charity album, Sparks n' Mind, released in aid of Aware.

== Albums ==
=== Studio albums ===
List of studio albums, with selected information
Title	Details	Peak chart positions							Certifications
Title	Details	IRL	UK	US	US Folk	US Heat	US Indie	US Rock	Certifications
Sea Sew	Released: 1 January 2008; Label: Barp, ATO; Formats: CD, download	3	58	135	—	3	19	—	IRMA: Platinum
Passenger	Released: 10 September 2011; Label: Hoop, ATO, PIAS; Formats: CD, download, vinyl	1	51	— (Note: Passenger did not enter the Billboard 200 but did peak at number 165 on the Top Current Albums chart.)	6	2	32	—	
At Swim	Released: 19 August 2016; Label: Hoop, ATO, PIAS; Formats: CD, download, vinyl	1	24	—	12	8	29	38	
"—" denotes a title that did not chart.

=== Live albums ===
List of live albums, with selected information
Title	Details	Peak chart positions	
Title	Details	IRL	US Classical
Live in Dublin (with Stargaze)	Released: 31 May 2019; Label: Hoop, PIAS; Formats: CD, download, vinyl	64	9

== Singles ==
Year	Title	Album
2008	"Lille"	Sea Sew
2009	"I Don't Know"	Sea Sew
2009	"An Ocean and a Rock"	Sea Sew
2011	"Knots"	Passenger
2012	"What'll I Do"	Passenger
2012	"O Sleep"	Passenger
2012	"Home"	Passenger
2012	"Passenger"	Passenger
2012	"Safe Travels (Don't Die)"	Passenger
2016	"Prayer for the Dying"	At Swim
2016	"Fall"	At Swim
2016	"Ora"	At Swim

== Damien Rice collaborations ==
Lisa appears on the Damien Rice albums O (2002) and 9 (2006) and collaborated with him on numerous other projects.

== Side projects / guest appearances / miscellaneous works ==
Year	Title	Notes
2001	"What a Curious Notion"	Backing vocals on this track from Mic Christopher's Skylarkin' album. This album was finished by Christopher's friends after his death in 2001.
2001	"Get the Party Started"	A cover of Pink's single that featured as a duet with Damien Rice on Even Better Than the Real Thing Vol. 1, a charity compilation CD released in Ireland in 2003.
2003	"Then Go"	Hannigan sings this track, written by Damien Rice, on the Live from the Union Chapel live album.
2003	"Once I Loved", "Desafinado", "Waters of March"	With Damien Rice, on the Goldfish Memory soundtrack.
2004	"Sideways Down"	Backing vocals on this track from The Frames album Burn the Maps, released in 2004.
2005	"Take a While"	Backing vocals on the album Pieced from Faded Memory by Galway-based band Lucas.
2005	"Coming Down"	Backing vocals on the album Pieced From Faded Memory by Galway-based band Lucas.
2005	"Unplayed Piano"	With Damien Rice, released as a single in June 2005 in support of the Free Aung San Suu Kyi 60th Birthday campaign.
2005	"Don't Explain"	With Damien Rice and Herbie Hancock on the Possibilities collaboration album. This song was written by Billie Holiday and Arthur Herzog Jr.
2006	"Don't Fuck with Me"	Alongside David Kitt, on his 2006 album Not Fade Away.
2006	"Banríon Mo Chroí"	An Irish language cover of the Mary Janes / Mic Christopher song titled "Queen of Hearts". It is performed by Hannigan, Shane Fitzsimons, Tomo and Vyvienne Long and was translated into the Irish language by Cora Molloy. It appears on the album Ceol '06.
2006	"Couldn't Love You More"	An unreleased track which was written by John Martyn and recorded with Faultline. It was played on one occasion by the music director of KCRW, Nic Harcourt, on his Morning Becomes Eclectic show on 17 March 2006 (Saint Patrick's Day).
2007	"Last Leaf"	Written by David Geraghty and featured on the self-titled album of The Cake Sale, a charity compilation CD released in Ireland in November 2006.
2007	"Some Surprise"	Written by Paul Noonan, this is a duet with Gary Lightbody which also features on The Cake Sale album. Featured on Grey's Anatomy.
2007	"Needles"	Written by Damien Rice, this track also featured on The Cake Sale album.
2007	"Ro Lan (Roll On)"	Backing vocals on this track from Colm O'Snodaigh's Giving album.
2007	"Giving"	Backing vocals on this track from Colm O'Snodaigh's Giving album.
2007	"Uaireannta"	Backing vocals on this track from Colm O'Snodaigh's Giving album.
2007	"Starbound"	Sung with the Franco – Irish collaboration Atlantean.
2008	"Upside Down"	Cover of the Diana Ross song that featured on the 2008 charity album Even Better Than the Disco Thing.
2008	"Christmas Past"	Sung with Mick Flannery in 2008.
2008	"My Pirate Disco"	A song that did not make Hannigan's debut album.
2009	"Courting Blues"	Cover version of the Bert Jansch song which featured on the charity album Sparks n' Mind, released in aid of Aware.
2009	"Personal Jesus"	Lisa covering Depeche Mode. Appeared on Last Call with Carson Daly.
2009	"Mele Kalikimaka"	BBC Radio 2's The Choir of Angels. Sung with Olivia Merilahti and Nerina Pallot.
2009	"Have Yourself a Merry Little Christmas"	Live on Today FM, Irish radio show.
2009	"The Times They Are a-Changin'"	Performed with The Chieftains on Herbie Hancock's album The Imagine Project.
2009	"Braille"	A B-side that was never released on an album. It was included in the soundtrack for the film Ondine
2010	"Slight of Hand"	Backing vocals on this track from Gavin Glass's Myna Birds album. This album was recorded in Nashville when touring the States.
2010	"Myna Birds"	Backing vocals on this track from Gavin Glass's Myna Birds album. This album was recorded in Nashville when touring the States.
2010	"Just Like Rome"	Sung with Gavin Glass live on RTÉ Radio.
2010	"Good or Bad Thing"	Backing vocals on this track from Rhob Cunningham's Our Little Secrets album.
2010	"Blurry"	A B-side that did not make Hannigan's debut. Appeared on the album Lisa Hannigan Live from the Artists Den.
2011	"Bells of Harlem"	Sung with James Vincent McMorrow at the Meteor Choice Music Prize concert.
2011	"Piano Furnace"	Appeared on Reverie.
2011	"O Holy Night"	BBC Radio 2's The Choir of Angels. Featuring Nerina Pallot and Fyfe Dangerfield.
2011	"I Believe in Father Christmas"	BBC Radio 2's The Choir of Angels. Backing vocals for Nerina Pallot (with Fyfe Dangerfield).
2011	"Away in a Manger"	BBC Radio 2's The Choir of Angels. Backing vocals for Fyfe Dangerfield (with Nerina Pallot).
2011	"Flowers"	A bonus track on iTunes version of Passenger.
2011	"Oh Undone"	A bonus track on iTunes version of Passenger.
2011	"Blow The Wind"	A bonus track on iTunes version of Passenger.
2012	"My Lagan Love"	Hannigan lent her voice to The Chieftains once again. This time she sang the main vocals for this track of their 50th anniversary album Voice Of Ages.
2012	"Somebody That I Used to Know"	Hannigan covering Gotye live on a Dutch radio show.
2012	"Here Comes the Sun"	Lisa covering The Beatles live on a Dutch radio show.
2012	"I Don't Know What We're Fighting For"	With Graham Linehan on the album Oscar the Hypno-Dog (And Other Tails)
2013	"Black Eyed Dog"	On Nick Drake's tribute album Way to Blue: The Songs of Nick Drake.
2013	"Saturday Sun"	With Luluc on Nick Drake's tribute album Way to Blue: The Songs of Nick Drake.
2013	"Lungs"	Backing vocals on the album Great Lakes from John Smith
2013	"Salty and Sweet"	Backing vocals on the album Great Lakes from John Smith
2013	"Freezing Winds of Change"	Backing vocals on the album Great Lakes from John Smith
2013	"Forever to the End"	Backing vocals on the album Great Lakes from John Smith
2013	"Falling Slowly"	Alongside Glen Hansard for RTÉ's Glaoch – The President's Call
2013	"My Lighthouse"	Backing vocals for Villagers Connor J. O'Brien at Soireé de Poche.
2013	"At the Heart of All of This Strangeness"	A Jape song sung alongside Jape at Ostrava and Bratislava concerts.
2013	"I'm on Fire"	A Bruce Springsteen song sung alongside Jape at Ostrava and Bratislava concerts.
2014	"Lass of Aughrim"	Supporting the inaugural publication of new, indie publishing house, de Selby Press.
2014	"Apparatchik"	Duet with Paul Noonan on his solo project album, Printer Clips
2014	"Sliabh Gallion Braes"	Sung at Seamus Heaney Tribute.
2014	"Anahorish"	Sung at Seamus Heaney Tribute.
2014	"Sorrow"	David Bowie cover on Today FM show.
2014	"Song of the Sea"	Song of the Sea soundtrack (also voice cast)
2017	"Oh! You Pretty Things"	A cover of David Bowie's song for the closing credits of episode six of the first season of Legion.
2017	"Send in the Clowns"	Song written by Stephen Sondheim – Lisa Hannigan vocal with artist/producer Faultline for an Audi car TV commercial.
2019	"The Tale of Steven"	As the voice of Blue Diamond in Steven Universe: The Movie
2019	"Let Us Adore You"	As the voice of Blue Diamond in Steven Universe: The Movie
2019	"Let Us Adore You (Reprise)"	As the voice of Blue Diamond in Steven Universe: The Movie
2020	"My Little Reason Why"	As the voice of Blue Diamond in Steven Universe Future

== See also ==
- Song of the Sea
