= Damien Rice discography =

This is the discography for Irish folk music singer Damien Rice.

== Albums ==
=== Studio albums ===
List of studio albums, with selected chart positions and certifications
Title	Album details	Peak chart positions												Certifications
Title	Album details	IRE	AUS	BEL (Fl)	BEL (Wa)	FRA	GER	ITA	NL	NOR	SWI	UK	US	Certifications
O	Released: 1 February 2002; Label: 14th Floor/Vector; Format: CD, LP, digital download	2	67	—	—	70	76	—	—	6	—	8	114	IRMA: 10× Platinum; ARIA: Gold; BPI: 4× Platinum; IFPI NOR: Gold; RIAA: Gold
9	Released: 3 November 2006; Label: Heffa; Format: CD, LP, digital download	1	33	14	53	86	87	33	20	8	48	4	22	BPI: Platinum
My Favourite Faded Fantasy	Released: 3 November 2014; Label: Warner Bros./WEA; Format: CD, LP, digital download	1	25	4	15	48	13	10	2	22	5	7	15	BPI: Silver

=== Live albums ===
Title	Album details	Peak chart positions	
Title	Album details	IRE	UK
Live from the Union Chapel	Released: 2003; Label: DRM/14th Floor; Format: CD, LP, digital download	—	—
Live at Fingerprints Warts & All	Released: 16 October 2007; Label: Warner Bros.; Format: CD, LP, digital download	58	179

== EPs ==
Title	EP details	Peak chart positions	
Title	EP details	IRE	UK
B-Sides	Released: 16 November 2004; Label: Vector; Format: CD, LP, digital download	1	143

== Singles ==
List of singles, with selected chart positions, showing year released as single and album name
Title	Year	Peak chart positions									Certifications	Album
Title	Year	IRE	AUS	BEL (Fl)	BEL (Wa)	FRA	GER	NL	SWI	UK	Certifications	Album
"The Blower's Daughter"	2001	38	82	—	—	93	—	—	—	27	BPI: Gold	O
"Cannonball"	2002	13	—	—	—	—	—	—	—	9	BPI: Platinum	O
"Woman Like a Man"	2003	—	—	—	—	—	—	—	—	—		Non-album track
"Volcano"	2003	29	—	—	—	—	—	—	—	29		O
"Moody Mooday"/"Lonelily"	2004	—	—	—	—	—	—	—	—	143		Non-album tracks
"Lonely Soldier" (with Christy Moore)	2004	4	—	—	—	—	—	—	—	142		Non-album tracks
"Unplayed Piano" (with Lisa Hannigan featuring Vyvienne Long, Tom Osander and Shane Fitzsimons)	2004	4	—	—	—	—	—	—	—	24		Non-album tracks
"9 Crimes"	2006	14	—	7	33	—	61	39	56	29	BPI: Silver	9
"Rootless Tree"	2007	—	—	—	—	—	—	—	—	50		9
"Dogs"	2007	—	—	—	—	—	—	10	—	88		9
"I Don't Want to Change You"	2014	59	—	52	60	—	—	53	—	—		My Favourite Faded Fantasy
"The Greatest Bastard"	2014	—	—	—	—	—	—	—	—	—		My Favourite Faded Fantasy
"Astronaut"	2022	—	—	—	—	—	—	—	—	—		The Busk Record
"—" denotes releases that did not chart or were not released in that territory.

== Other charted songs ==
Title	Year	Peak chart positions		Album
Title	Year	IRE	UK	Album
"Coconut Skins"	2012	65	—	9
"My Favourite Faded Fantasy"	2014	69	179	My Favourite Faded Fantasy

== Film and TV contributions ==
Rice has contributed two songs (Hypnosis and On Children) to the animation motion picture Khalil Gibran's The Prophet in 2015. To the Irish movie Goldfish Memory he contributed cover versions of Waters Of March, "Desafinado" and Once I Loved with Lisa Hannigan.

Rice's songs have been heard on numerous television shows including So You Think You Can Dance, American Idol, The L Word, True Blood, Hidden Palms, Bones, The Cleaner, Jericho, ER, The Black Donnellys, The OC, Alias, Lost, Huff, Crossing Jordan, Grey's Anatomy, Criminal Minds, House, Spin 1038, CSI: Crime Scene Investigation, The Inbetweeners, One Tree Hill, British television series, Misfits and the Korean drama, Spring Waltz.

Rice's songs have appeared in films such as Goldfish Memory (2003), Reservation Road, Higher Ground, Closer, I am David, Stay, In Good Company, The Girl in the Café, Shrek the Third and Dear Frankie.

His music is referenced in the 2009 novel The Suicide Club by Rhys Thomas, and his songs have been used in professional figure skating competitions.

== Collaborations (released) ==
- "Back to Beginning" with Lamb on 5 (2011)
- "Everything You're Not Supposed To Be" and "Uncomfortable" with Mélanie Laurent on En t'attendant (2011)
- "There Are Debts" with David Hopkins on There Are Debts (2010)
- "Making Noise" with The Cheshire Project on Songs for Tibet: The Art of Peace (2008)
- "To Love Somebody" with Ray Lamontagne on Taratata (2007)
- "The Power of Orange Knickers" with Tori Amos on The Beekeeper (2005)
- "Don't Explain" with Herbie Hancock and Lisa Hannigan (2005)
- Live at the Olympia with Aslan (2005)
- "Skylarkin'" with Mic Christopher (2002)
- "Be Yourself" with Jerry Fish and the Mudbug Club (2002)
