= List of songs recorded by Damien Rice =

This is a list of musical recordings by Irish singer-songwriter Damien Rice.

== Officially released ==
Song title	Appearing with	Album	Notes	Year
Full Moon	Juniper	The J-Plane	-	1994
Rusted Sparkle	Juniper	The J-Plane	-	1994
Indeterminate	Juniper	The J-Plane	-	1994
Not Quite Divine	Juniper	The J-Plane	-	1994
Enough	Juniper	The J-Plane	-	1994
Insane	Juniper	Manna	-	1995
Lie to an Angel	Juniper	Manna	-	1995
Relief	Juniper	Manna	-	1995
Shannon Court	Juniper	Manna	-	1995
I Just Can't Help Believing	Juniper	Natural Born Elvis	Elvis Presley Cover	1998
Weatherman	Juniper	Weatherman	-	1998
Little Sister	Juniper	Weatherman	-	1998
The Rage	Juniper	Weatherman	-	1998
World Is Dead	Juniper	World Is Dead	-	1998
You	Juniper	World Is Dead	-	1998
Orchard	Juniper	World Is Dead	-	1998
Weatherman (Bobby Wonder Remix)	Juniper	World Is Dead	-	1998
Delicate	-	O	-	2002
Volcano	-	O	-	2002
The Blower's Daughter	-	O	-	2002
Cannonball	-	O	-	2002
Older Chests	-	O	-	2002
Amie	-	O	-	2002
Cheers Darlin'	-	O	-	2002
Cold Water	-	O	-	2002
I Remember	-	O	-	2002
Eskimo	-	O	-	2002
Prague	-	O	-	2002
Silent Night	-	O	-	2002
Happy Xmas (War Is Over)	-	It's All Bells	John Lennon Cover	2002
Get The Party Started	Lisa Hannigan	Even Better Than the Real Thing Vol. 1	Pink Cover	2003
The Professor & La Fille Danse	-	B-Sides	-	2004
Lonelily	-	B-Sides	Demo	2004
Woman Like a Man	-	B-Sides	-	2004
Moody Mooday	-	B-Sides	-	2004
Cannonball (Radio Remix)	-	B-Sides	-	2004
Lonely Soldier	Christy Moore, Lisa Hannigan	Lonely Soldier	-	2004
Desafinado	Lisa Hannigan	Goldfish Memory	Antônio Carlos Jobim Cover	2005
Once I Loved	Lisa Hannigan	Goldfish Memory	Antônio Carlos Jobim Cover	2005
Waters Of March	Lisa Hannigan	Goldfish Memory	Antônio Carlos Jobim Cover	2005
Don't Explain	Herbie Hancock, Lisa Hannigan	Possibilities	-	2005
The Power Of Orange Knickers	Tori Amos	The Beekeeper	-	2005
When Doves Cry	-	Triple J: Like a Version (Vol. 1)	Prince Cover	2005
Unplayed Piano	Lisa Hannigan	Unplayed Piano	-	2005
Cross-Eyed Bear	-	War Child: Help: A Day In The Life	-	2005
9 Crimes	-	9	-	2006
The Animals Were Gone	-	9	-	2006
Elephant	-	9	-	2006
Rootless Tree	-	9	-	2006
Dogs	-	9	-	2006
Coconut Skins	-	9	-	2006
Me, My Yoke + I	-	9	-	2006
Grey Room	-	9	-	2006
Accidental Babies	-	9	-	2006
Sleep Don't Weep	-	9	-	2006
Rat Within The Grain	-	9 Crimes (Single)	-	2006
Childish	-	Dogs (Single)	-	2007
Que Sera, Sera	David Gray	Live Earth -The Concerts for a Climate in Crisis	-	2007
Then Go	-	Live from the Union Chapel	-	2007
Baby Sister	-	Live From The Union Chapel	-	2007
Be My Husband	-	Live From The Union Chapel	Nina Simone Cover	2007
Creep	-	Sounds Eclectic: The Covers Project	Radiohead Cover	2007
Making Noise	The Cheshire Project	Songs For Tibet – The Art of Peace	-	2008
There Are Debts	David Hopkins	There Are Debts	-	2009
Connoisseur of Great Excuse	-	Gasoline Rainbows	iTunes Release	2010
Lonely Soldier (Solo Version)	-	Raise Hope for Congo	-	2010
Look at Me	-	Canciones de Cuna	-	2010
Under The Tongue	-	Music of Ireland · Welcome Home	-	2010
Back To Beginning	Lamb	5	-	2011
Everything You're Not Supposed To Be	Mélanie Laurent	En t'attendant	-	2011
One	-	(Ǎhk-to͝ong Bay-bi) Covered	U2 Cover	2011
Uncomfortable	Mélanie Laurent	En t'attendant	-	2011
You're The One That I Want	Angus & Julia Stone	The Flowerpot Sessions	John Travolta/Olivia Newton-John Cover, Live	2011
Hallelujah	-	Rock and Roll Hall of Fame, Vol. 10: 2008–2009	Leonard Cohen Cover	2011
The Power of Orange Knickers	Tori Amos	The Beekeeper	-	2012
Sing	Maria Doyle Kennedy	Sing	-	2012
Time To Go	Mia Maestro	Blue Eyed Sailor	-	2012
My Favourite Faded Fantasy	-	My Favourite Faded Fantasy	-	2014
I Don't Want to Change You	-	My Favourite Faded Fantasy	-	2014
The Greatest Bastard	-	My Favourite Faded Fantasy	-	2014
It Takes a Lot To Know a Man	-	My Favourite Faded Fantasy	-	2014
Colour me In	-	My Favourite Faded Fantasy	-	2014
The Box	-	My Favourite Faded Fantasy	-	2014
Trusty and True	-	My Favourite Faded Fantasy	-	2014
Long Long Way	-	My Favourite Faded Fantasy	-	2014
Camarillas	-	My Favourite Faded Fantasy	-	2014
Hypnosis	-	The Prophet (Music From The Motion Picture)	-	2015
On Children	-	The Prophet (Music From The Motion Picture)	-	2015
Chandelier	-	Songs for Australia	Sia Cover	2020
Song For Berta	Sandrayati, JFDR	Song For Berta (Single)	Tribute to Berta Cáceres	2021
Astronaut (Live at St. Patrick's Catherdral)	-	The Busk	-	2022

=== Unreleased songs ===
The following are songs that have either been performed live or demoed, yet remain officially unreleased.

Song title	Notes
100 Miles Across The Room	-
Back To Her Man	Homage to Leonard Cohen
Beast & Beauty	-
Be Real With Me	-
Boring Afternoon	-
Black Is The Colour	Cover, traditional Scottish song
Bottom Shelf	-
Child, Man, Silly Dog	-
Closer	-
Cutting The Rose	Juniper Demo
Down	-
Everyone Said It (Nothing Had A Hold On Me)	-
Face	-
Famous Blue Raincoat	Leonard Cohen Cover
Fear	-
Fool	-
Forgotten Tears	-
Front Door	-
Glory Box	Portishead cover
Groovin'	-
Happy Joe Green	-
Insane	-
Is That It, My Friend?	-
It Didn't Take You Long	-
Kiss	Prince & the Revolution cover
Lazy Situation	-
Mustard Seeds	-
My City Shitty	-
Never	-
Old Tomatoes	-
Red-Nosed Happy	-
Rule Number 2 Y. Junction	-
Sand	-
Sex Change	-
Slow	-
Star Star	The Frames Cover
Steal A Mule	-
Stoic	-
Stone	-
No One Need Know	-
You Shouldn't Be Here	-
Talkin' 'bout a Revolution	Tracy Chapman cover
The Waiting Song	-
Toffee Pop	-
Tongue	-
What Do You Know About Love?	-
What If I Am Wrong?	-
What This Night Is For	-
Wooden Horse	-

== Notes ==
Lisa Hannigan appears on the majority of releases from 2001 to 2007.
