= B-Sides (Damien Rice EP) =

B-Sides (US release)

EP compilation album by Damien Rice
- Released: August 2004
- Genre: Folk
- Length: 26:12
- Language: English
- Label: Vector
- Producer: Damien Rice

Damien Rice chronology
| O (2002) | B-Sides (US release) (2004) | 9 (2006) |

Professional ratings
Review scores
| Source | Rating |
|---|---|
| PopMatters | 3/5 stars |
| Rolling Stone | 3/5 stars |

B-Sides is an EP/compilation album of Damien Rice's b-sides from singles released from his album, O. The EP includes different takes of album tracks, such as live versions, acoustic versions, instrumental versions and a demo recording of hit single "Volcano" recorded onto Rice's cassette Walkman from 1997.

== Track listing ==
| No. | Title | Length |
|---|---|---|
| 1. | "The Professor & La Fille Danse" (Live at Cornucopia) | 5:09 |
| 2. | "Lonelily" (Original Demo) | 3:14 |
| 3. | "Woman Like a Man" (Live Unplugged) | 4:45 |
| 4. | "Moody Mooday" | 3:50 |
| 5. | "Delicate" (Live in Dublin) | 6:07 |
| 6. | "Volcano" (Instrumental) | 3:30 |
| 7. | "Volcano" ('97 Demo) | 2:36 |
| 8. | "Cannonball" (Radio Remix) | 3:27 |

The US release does not include the radio remix of "Cannonball".

== Personnel ==
- Damien Rice – vocals, guitar, production
- Shane Fitzsimons – bass guitar
- Lisa Hannigan – vocals
- Vyvienne Long – cello
- Tom Osander – percussion, drums
