= The Blower's Daughter =

2001 single by Damien Rice

Single by Damien Rice

from the album O
- Released: 21 September 2001
- Genre: Folk
- Length: 4:44
- Label: 14th Floor Records
- Composer: Damien Rice
- Lyricist: Damien Rice

Damien Rice singles chronology
"The Blower's Daughter" (2001)	"Cannonball" (2002)

Music video
- "The Blower's Daughter" on YouTube

"The Blower's Daughter" is the debut single by Irish musician Damien Rice, released on 21 September 2001 through 14th Floor Records. It was released as the lead single for Rice's debut studio album O. It was written and produced by Rice and features vocals by Lisa Hannigan.

The song has also been covered by other artists, including American singer Matt McAndrew, who performed the song at the talent show The Voice, as well as Brazilian musicians Ana Carolina and Seu Jorge, who made a Portuguese language version of the song titled "É Isso Aí".

== Background and composition ==
The meaning of the song has been greatly speculated due to Rice not giving many interviews to promote the album explaining the lyrics. One popular interpretation of the song talks about the story of the daughter of a clarinet teacher while another is related to a fictional story that Rice told at concerts about him having a conversation with a woman while working at a call center. It has also been speculated that the song is inspired by Lisa Hannigan, who features in the song and was in a relationship with Rice until 2007.

Called an "intense folky ballad", the song is played in E major at a tempo of 66 beats per minute. Rice's vocals span from B3 to A♯5 in the song.

== Release and commercial performance ==
The song was first released on 21 September 2001, exclusively in Ireland, as the first single for Rice's debut album O, set to be released the following year. The song debuted on the Irish Singles Chart at number 38, leaving the chart the next week. In 2004, after Rice was signed under Warner Music, "The Blower's Daughter" was released as a single to different European countries, achieving moderate success.

Three years after its first release, the single entered the UK Singles Chart on 25 December 2004. It peaked at number 27 and remained in the chart for five weeks. On 4 November 2013, the song entered the ARIA Top 100 Singles Chart at the 82nd position while on 7 March 2015, it entered the French Singles Chart placing at number 93, becoming Rice's first and only song to chart in any of the two countries.

== Usage in other media ==
The song has been extensively used in various films and television series. Namely, it was featured in the trailer of the 2004 drama film Closer, directed by Mike Nichols, as well as in the film itself. It has also been featured in the American television series The L Word, the Italian film The Caiman, and the German television series Polizeiruf 110, among others. Additionally, it was performed by dancer Travis Wall on the second season of the American dance competition show So You Think You Can Dance.

=== Cover versions ===
Several cover versions of the song have been performed in different television programs around the world. In 2013, Australian singer Taylor Henderson covered the song for the final episode of the fifth season of The X Factor Australia. His cover peaked at number 43 at the ARIA Top 100 Singles Chart while the original version charted the same week at number 82. In 2014, American singer-songwriter Matt McAndrew performed the song for the Live Top 8 episode on the seventh season of the American talent show The Voice. His version had opening sales of 92,000 downloads and peaked at number 40 on the Billboard Hot 100. The performance led the original version to appear on the Hot Rock & Alternative Songs at number 15. The song was also performed by Nadeem Leigh in 2013 on the second season of The Voice UK and by Joe Moore in 2015 on the fourth season of The Voice Australia.

Brazilian singer Simone made a Portuguese-language version of the song titled "Então Me Diz…", adapted by Zélia Duncan, for her 2005 live album Simone ao Vivo. The song peaked at number 45 in Brazil according to the Crowley Broadcast Analysis, and was featured in the Brazilian telenovela Belíssima. Mexican singer Kalimba included a Spanish-language version of the song under the name "No Puedo Dejarte de Amar" in his 2006 album NegroKlaro, the track features Jesús Navarro from the band Reik.

== Personnel ==
- Lead vocals, guitar, bass, clarinet, drums, recording – Damien Rice
- Lead vocals – Lisa Hannigan
- Cello – Vyvienne Long
- Mastering – Robyn Robins

== Charts ==
Chart (2001–2015)	Peak position
Australia (ARIA Top 100 Singles)	82
Ireland (IRMA)	38
France (SNEP)	93
UK Singles (Official Charts)	27
US (Hot Rock & Alternative Songs)	15

== Certifications ==
Region	Certification	Certified units/sales
United Kingdom (BPI)	Gold	400,000^{‡}
^{‡} Sales+streaming figures based on certification alone.

== Ana Carolina and Seu Jorge version ==
"É Isso Aí"

Single by Ana Carolina and Seu Jorge

from the album Ana & Jorge
- Language: Portuguese
- Released: 28 November 2005
- Length: 5:18
- Label: Sony BMG
- Composers: Damien Rice; Ana Carolina

Music video
- "É Isso Aí" on YouTube

"É Isso Aí" is a single by Brazilian musicians Ana Carolina and Seu Jorge, released on 28 November 2005 through Sony BMG. It is the lead single from their 2006 live album Ana & Jorge. The lyrics were adapted to Portuguese by Ana Carolina.

The single was commercially successful, peaking at number eight in Portugal. At the 2006 Multishow Brazilian Music Award, it was nominated for Best Song, while at the 2006 Troféu Imprensa it tied for Best Song with "Quando a Chuva Passar" by Ivete Sangalo.

=== Charts ===
Chart (2012)	Peak position
Portugal (AFP)	8

== Adaptations ==
The song was adapted in Greek as "Χωρίς καρδιά" (Without a heart) by Sakis Rouvas, who represented Greece multiple times in the Eurovision Song Contest, in his 2006 album Live Ballads.
