= Goldfish Memory =

- Directed by: Elizabeth Gill
- Written by: Elizabeth Gill
- Produced by: Breda Walsh
- Starring: Sean Campion; Fiona O'Shaughnessy; Fiona Glascott
- Cinematography: Ken Byrne
- Edited by: Dermot Diskin
- Music by: Richie Buckley
- Distributed by: Wolfe Video
- Release date: 2003
- Running time: 85 minutes
- Country: Ireland
- Language: English
- Budget: € 900,000

Goldfish Memory is a 2003 Irish feature film about everyday relationships, set and filmed in Dublin. It was written and directed by Elizabeth Gill.

== Plot ==
The movie is set around a small group of characters experiencing relationships which build and crumble before the viewers' eyes. The title of the film refers to the belief, expressed by several of characters, that the goldfish retains a memory of something for only three seconds. Tom, one of the principal characters in the film, draws comparisons between this and the human tendency to jump from one relationship to the next, "forgetting" the pain that any previous one might have caused. The film shows complexities involved in straight, gay, lesbian, and bisexual relationships. Writer/director Liz Gill says the film was influenced by the work of directors Robert Altman and Richard Linklater, particularly Linklater's film Slacker.

== Cast ==
- Sean Campion as Tom
- Fiona O'Shaughnessy as Clara
- Fiona Glascott as Isolde
- Peter Gaynor as David
- Keith McErlean as Red
- Stuart Graham as Larry
- Lise Hearns as Rosie
- Jean Butler as Renee
- Justine Mitchell as Kate
- Aisling O'Neill as Helen
- Demien McAdam as Conzo
- Flora Montgomery as Angie
- Joe Keever as Eddie the Cameraman
- Britta Smith as Mrs. Devine
- Niall O'Brien as Taxi Driver

== Soundtrack ==
The film's soundtrack acted as something of a showcase for the Irish alternative music scene of the time. Alongside relatively established bands like The Frames and The Walls, it also featured up and coming acts like Rodrigo y Gabriela, Nina Hynes and Messiah J and the Expert.

Four songs by the legendary Brazilian Bossa Nova composer Tom Jobim were remade for the movie, three of which ('Once I Loved', 'Waters of March' and 'Desafinado') were performed by Damien Rice with Lisa Hannigan (vocals) and Vyvienne Long (cello). The other ('Lamento No Morro') was performed by Richie Buckley.

== Critical reaction ==
Peter Bradshaw, writing in The Guardian, described Goldfish Memory as a "forgettable" and "vapid relationship comedy, reminiscent of the sponsorship ads that wrap around the commercials during TV's Friends".

== See also ==
- List of LGBT-related films directed by women
