= My Favourite Faded Fantasy =

Studio album by Damien Rice
- Released: 31 October 2014
- Studio: Shangri-La, Malibu, California; Big Spring Studio, Seltjarnarnes, Iceland; Sundlaugin Studio, Mosfellsbær, Iceland; Sage & Sound, Hollywood, California; Woodland Studios, Nashville, Tennessee; The Bank, Burbank, California; Pickering Studios, Ireland
- Genre: Folk
- Length: 49:50
- Label: Damien Rice Music; Vector Recordings; Warner Bros. (US and Canada)
- Producer: Rick Rubin, Damien Rice

Damien Rice chronology
| Live from the Union Chapel (2007) | My Favourite Faded Fantasy (2014) |

Singles from My Favourite Faded Fantasy
- 1. "My Favourite Faded Fantasy" Released: 8 September 2014; 2. "I Don't Want to Change You" Released: 24 September 2014; 3. "The Greatest Bastard" Released: 30 October 2014

My Favourite Faded Fantasy is the third studio album by Irish singer, songwriter and producer Damien Rice. The album was released in Ireland on 31 October 2014 and subsequently in other territories on 3 November and then released on vinyl on 7 November 2014, almost eight years since the release of his previous album, 9. The album was produced by Rick Rubin.

== Critical reception ==
Professional ratings
Aggregate scores
| Source | Rating |
|---|---|
| Metacritic | 76/100 |
Review scores
| Source | Rating |
| AllMusic | link |
| The Guardian | link |
| Q | 3/5 stars |
| Slant Magazine | 3/5 stars |
| Sputnikmusic | link |

At Metacritic, which assigns a normalized rating out of 100 to reviews from music critics, the album has received an average score of 76, indicating "generally favorable", based on 15 reviews. Jessica Goodman and Ryan Kistobak of The Huffington Post included the album on their list of 2014's best releases, declaring the album "a devastating reminder that love leaves you crumbling and fantasies are just fiction". Goodman complimented Rice's "delicate vocals" as "sinister and familiar".

== Track listing ==
All tracks are written by Damien Rice.

| No. | Title | Length |
|---|---|---|
| 1. | "My Favourite Faded Fantasy" | 6:12 |
| 2. | "It Takes a Lot to Know a Man" | 9:33 |
| 3. | "The Greatest Bastard" | 5:04 |
| 4. | "I Don't Want to Change You" | 5:26 |
| 5. | "Colour Me In" | 5:18 |
| 6. | "The Box" | 4:27 |
| 7. | "Trusty and True" | 8:09 |
| 8. | "Long Long Way" | 6:21 |

Limited edition box set bonus track
| No. | Title | Length |
|---|---|---|
| 9. | "Camarillas" | 2:44 |

== Personnel ==
- Damien Rice – vocals, acoustic guitar (1–8), electric guitar (1), piano (1, 2, 4–7), clarinet (1, 8), tambourine (1), sounds and percussion (2), pump organ (5, 6), bass (7, 8), harmonium (8)
- Joel Shearer – crotales (1, 8), tambourine (1), shaker (1), electric guitar swells (1), bass (2, 6, 7), sounds and percussion (2), electric guitar (2, 4, 8), cuatro (7), muted guitar (7), dulcimer (7), cymbals (7), Wurlitzer (8), bells (8), vibraphone (8), piano (8), celeste (8), glockenspiel (8), chimes (8), acoustic guitar (8), harmonium (8)
- Zac Rae – Wurlitzer (1, 4), pad (1), tack piano (1), vibraphone (2), Hammond organ (3, 4), piano (4)
- David Rawlings – archtop guitar (1, 7), backing vocals (7)
- Cora Venus Lunny – violin (1–4, 7), backing vocals (1, 2, 7), viola (2, 3)
- Borgar Magnason – double bass (1, 3, 5, 7)
- Sólrún Sumarliðadóttir – cello (1)
- Julia Mogensen – cello (1, 2, 5, 6, 8)
- Shahzad Ismaily – bass (1, 2, 4), drums (6, 8), shaker (6), floor tom (7), Hammond organ (8), cymbals (8), crotales (8), Moog (8), cowbell (8)
- Magnús Trygvason Eliassen – drums (1)
- Earl Harvin – percussion (1), drums (4), tambourine (4)
- Helgi Jónsson – trombone (1, 2, 3, 6, 8), backing vocals (2)
- James Gadson – drums (2)
- Alex Somers – sampler (2–4, 8), bass drum (3), sub bass (3), harp (4)
- Deron Johnson – piano (2, 3), Hammond organ (1)
- Tina Dico – backing vocals (2)
- Bryndis Halla Gylfadottir – cello (3, 4)
- Frank Aarnink – tympani (3), gong (3), cymbals (3)
- Una Sveinbjarnardottir – violin (5, 6, 8), viola (8)
- Markéta Irglová – piano (6), vocals (8)
- Gyda Valtisdottir – cello (6, 8), backing vocals (8)
- Victor Indrizzo – drums (7)
- Marlana Sheetz – backing vocals (1, 8)
- Andrew Heringer – backing vocals (7)
- Robbie Arnett – backing vocals (7, 8)
- Rónán Ó Snodaigh – bodhran (7), backing vocals (7)
- Colm Ó Snodaigh – tin whistle (7)
- Emil Friðfinnsson – French horn (8)

== Commercial performance ==
In Canada, the album debuted at number eight on the Canadian Albums Chart, selling just 4,000 copies.

== Charts ==
=== Weekly charts ===
| Chart (2014) | Peak position |
|---|---|
| Australian Albums (ARIA) | 25 |
| Austrian Albums (Ö3 Austria) | 19 |
| Belgian Albums (Ultratop Flanders) | 4 |
| Belgian Albums (Ultratop Wallonia) | 15 |
| Canadian Albums (Billboard) | 8 |
| Danish Albums (Hitlisten) | 38 |
| Dutch Albums (Album Top 100) | 2 |
| French Albums (SNEP) | 48 |
| German Albums (Offizielle Top 100) | 13 |
| Irish Albums (IRMA) | 1 |
| Italian Albums (FIMI) | 10 |
| New Zealand Albums (RMNZ) | 33 |
| Spanish Albums (Promusicae) | 26 |
| Swiss Albums (Schweizer Hitparade) | 5 |
| UK Albums (OCC) | 7 |
| US Billboard 200 | 15 |

=== Year-end charts ===
| Chart (2014) | Position |
|---|---|
| Belgian Albums (Ultratop Flanders) | 78 |
| Dutch Albums (Album Top 100) | 78 |

| Chart (2015) | Position |
|---|---|
| Belgian Albums (Ultratop Flanders) | 77 |
