= The Big Romance =

Studio album by David Kitt
- Released: June 18, 2001
- Recorded: David Kitt
- Genre: Indie
- Length: 55:13
- Label: Blanco Y Negro
- Producer: David Kitt

David Kitt chronology
Small Moments (2000)	The Big Romance (2001)	Square One (2003)

Professional ratings
Review scores
Source	Rating
AllMusic	3/5 stars
NME	3.5/5 stars
RTÉ	4/5 stars

The Big Romance is the second album by Irish singer-songwriter David Kitt. It was released on June 18, 2001.

It was voted by Hot Press magazine to be the 31st best Irish album ever.

== Track listing ==
1. "Song from Hope St. [Brooklyn NY]" - 5:20
2. "You Know What I Want to Know" - 3:51
3. "Step Outside in the Morning Light" - 5:28
4. "Private Dance" - 2:35
5. "Pale Blue Light" - 5:33
6. "What I Ask" - 7:54
7. "Strange Light in the Evening" - 5:54
8. "Whispers Return the Sun, Rest the Moon" - 6:11
9. "You and the City" - 6:43
10. "Into the Breeze" - 5:39
