= 9 Crimes =

Single by Damien Rice

from the album 9
- B-side: "The Rat Within the Grain"
- Released: 27 November 2006
- Recorded: 2005
- Genre: Indie rock
- Length: 3:39
- Label: Heffa, 14th Floor
- Songwriter: Damien Rice
- Producer: Damien Rice

Damien Rice singles chronology
| "Unplayed Piano" (2005) | "9 Crimes" (2006) | "Rootless Tree" (2007) |

"9 Crimes" is the first single from the album 9 by Irish musician Damien Rice with additional vocals from Lisa Hannigan. It was released on 27 November 2006. The song had a music video directed by Jamie Thraves.

== Production ==
The song was written by Damien Rice for his album 9. The song and the albums titles are related. Lisa Hannigan, a frequent collaborator of Rice, also worked on the single.

A music video for the song was directed by Jamie Thraves. Thraves took inspiration from the classic short film, The Red Balloon. He had previously had the idea for the music video for the Radiohead song "No Surprises". In a 2010 interview with The Independent, Thraves stated that "9 Crimes" was his favourite to work on.

== Release and reception ==
"9 Crimes" was released on 27 November 2006. The B-side of the single features the song "The Rat Within the Grain".

=== Critical reception ===
Writing for The Music, David James Young listed the song among the best of Rice's songs. Young wrote, "Like much of his best work, 9 Crimes thrives on the contrast of its beautiful musical landscape with its intentionally ugly lyricism. The shame that hangs in the air with each word is kept up there by means of its lilting, reverberating piano and quivering cello."

Writing for Pitchfork, Marc Hogan criticized the song stating that it set a bland and generic tone for the rest of the album.

=== Charts ===
The songs peak performance on the Irish Recorded Music Association chart was at number 14. The songs best performance was at number 5 on the Billboard Bubbling Under Hot 100 chart.

Chart performance for "9 Crimes"
| Chart (2006–2013) | Peak position |
|---|---|
| Austria (Ö3 Austria Top 40) | 57 |
| Belgium (Ultratop 50 Flanders) | 7 |
| Belgium (Ultratop 50 Wallonia) | 33 |
| Germany (GfK) | 61 |
| Ireland (IRMA) | 14 |
| Netherlands (Single Top 100) | 39 |
| Switzerland (Schweizer Hitparade) | 56 |
| UK Singles (OCC) | 29 |
| US Bubbling Under Hot 100 (Billboard) | 5 |

=== Certifications ===
"9 Crimes" was certified Silver in the United Kingdom and Gold in Belgium.

Certifications for "9 Crimes"
| Region | Certification | Certified units/sales |
|---|---|---|
| Belgium (BRMA) | Gold | 25,000^{*} |
| United Kingdom (BPI) | Silver | 200,000^{‡} |
^{*} Sales figures based on certification alone.^{‡} Sales+streaming figures based on certification alone.
