= Heyday (song) =

Song by Mic Christopher

Single by Mic Christopher

from the album Skylarkin' (Mic Christopher album)
- Released: October 2000
- Recorded: May 2000
- Genre: Rock
- Length: 3:53
- Label: Loza Records
- Songwriter: Mic Christopher

"Heyday" is a song by Irish-American rock singer, Mic Christopher, released in October 2000 as the title track from his first solo EP 'Heyday'. It was written by Christopher. It was re-released on January 23 2004. In 2002, it was featured in Skylarkin', Christopher's first and only solo album. It was later released after his death in November 2001.

Christopher performed "Heyday" on Ireland AM on TV3 on 22 February 2001.

The song peaked at 11 in the Irish Charts after Heyday EP was re-released on 23 January 2004.

== Guinness television advert ==
The song gained fame in December 2003 after it appeared on the Guinness advert Quarrel, starring Michael Fassbender. “Music is obviously an important part of advertising and particularly Guinness advertising,” “The idea to pick ‘Heyday’ was down to Nick(Kelly) who used to be the lead singer in The Fat Lady Sings and has a huge breadth of knowledge of the Irish music industry and music in general. The reason he picked ‘Heyday’ was that he wanted something that was emotional but not downbeat. The second thing was that he wanted a rhythm from the start, so from the very start of the ad you have motion.” -Damian Devaney of Guinness Michael Fassbender also appears in the music video

== Re-release ==
The single was re-released on 23 January 2004 as a result of the Guinness advert released a month earlier.
