= Dogs (Damien Rice song) =

Single by Damien Rice

from the album 9
- Released: 17 September 2007
- Recorded: 3:44
- Label: Heffa, 14th Floor Records
- Songwriter(s): Damien Rice
- Producer(s): Damien Rice

Damien Rice singles chronology
"'Rootless Tree'" (2007)	"Dogs" (2007)

"Dogs" is the third single from Damien Rice's second album 9. The single was released in Ireland as a digital download on 24 August 2007, then in the UK on 17 September 2007, where it charted at number 88. The single is the first release since Damien and Lisa Hannigan parted ways. The single mix for the song is much more upbeat and has noticeable drum beats.

== Track listing ==
CD:

1. "Dogs" (Remix)
2. "Childish" (Live At Wisseloord Studios)

7" vinyl #1 (gatefold sleeve):

1. "Dogs" (Remix)
2. "Elephant" (Live at Wisseloord Studios)

7" vinyl #2 (poster sleeve):

1. "Dogs" (Remix)
2. "Accidental Babies" (Live at Wisseloord Studios)

== Charts ==
Chart (2007)	Peak position
Netherlands (Dutch Top 40)	17
Netherlands (Single Top 100)	10
UK Singles (OCC)	88
US Adult Alternative Songs (Billboard)	20
