= Mic Christopher =

Irish musician (1969–2001)

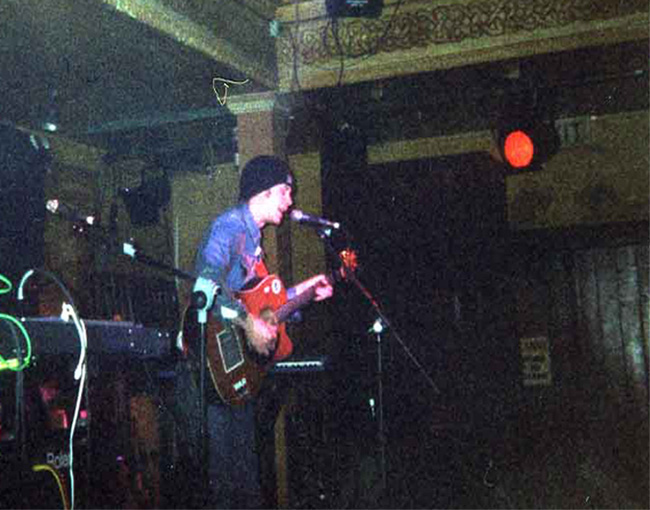
- Christopher live at Whelan's, 2001
- Born: Michael Christopher; 21 September 1969; Bronx, New York City, U.S.
- Died: 29 November 2001 (aged 32); Groningen, Netherlands
- Occupation: Singer-songwriter
- Known for: The Mary Janes

Michael "Mic" Christopher (21 September 1969 – 29 November 2001) was an Irish singer-songwriter, best known for his posthumously released debut album Skylarkin'.

== Early life ==
Michael Christopher was born in The Bronx, New York City, to Irish parents Harry Christopher from Dublin and Vaun Heaney from Sixmilecross, County Tyrone. They moved back to Dublin in 1972 when Michael was still a toddler. He later attended Coláiste Chilliain in Clondalkin. He started playing traditional Irish music with school groups until he was about fifteen years old when he started busking. Busking in Dublin over the next five years, Christopher made friends with many of the musicians on the Dublin circuit, including brothers Karl and David Odlum, Glen Hansard and others.

== Musical career ==
In 1990, Christopher formed the band The Mary Janes with former Kíla bass player and fellow busker Karl Odlum, and added Simon Good on guitar and Steven Hogan on drums. The band's line-up evolved over the next nine years, becoming a three piece without drums when Hogan left the group. It was the three-piece version that recorded the band's first album, Bored of Their Laughing. In 1994, the Mary Janes signed a publishing deal with Warner-Chappell. In 1996 the band acquired the drumming talents of Australian Mark Stanley, with this line-up recording their second album, Sham, in 1998. Over the years The Mary Janes played everywhere from the Feile and Fleadh music festivals in Ireland, to Glastonbury Festival in England, to the CMJ in New York City. The band also performed a six-week stint in Bosnia with the War Child charity. The Mary Janes split in 1999 and Christopher embarked on a three-month solo tour of Victoria, Australia. In 2001, having recovered from a bad motorbike accident, Christopher released his solo Heyday EP and announced that he would be supporting The Waterboys on their next tour.

== Death ==
Christopher's 2001 tour with the Waterboys performed in De Oosterpoort in Groningen, Netherlands, on 16 November 2001. That night, after he had played his set supporting The Waterboys, Christopher was found unconscious, having apparently struck his head on some steps during an accidental fall. On arrival at a local hospital, he was found to have lapsed into a coma as a result of severe swelling to the brain. He never regained consciousness, and died on 29 November 2001.

== Skylarkin' ==
Christopher had been working on a solo album entitled Skylarkin' prior to his death. The album was incomplete but Christopher had made notes as to how the recordings could be improved. During November 2002, work from many of his friends and family resulted in the posthumous release of Christopher's first and only solo album. Skylarkin' later won Best Album at the 2003 Meteor Awards. His family were present to collect the award.

== Legacy ==
- Since Christopher's death, Glen Hansard of the Frames has dedicated each of that band's albums to him. They also dedicate their cover version of his hit "Heyday" to him when played live.
- Damien Rice dedicated his album O, released eight weeks after Christopher's death, to his departed friend.
- Lisa Hannigan dedicated the song "Splishy Splashy" to him on her debut album Sea Sew (2008).
- Rónán Ó Snodaigh from Kíla, who co-wrote the song "Friends with Mic" and shared a flat with him in the years before his death, wrote the song "The Dream I Haven't Shown Her" on his album The Playdays for Mic; it is a medley of the W.H. Auden poem "Funeral Blues" and a song written by Mic Christopher, "Embrace the Day".
- In 2021, the Mary Janes released a previously unrecorded track named "Heartbreaker" about Christopher.
- In 2021, Christopher's friends and family held a tribute concert, titled Happy Birthday Mic Christopher. The concert was held at Whelans, Dublin. On 21 September 2021, a live album, recorded by Christopher in 2001, was released.

== Discography ==
=== Studio albums ===
- Skylarkin' (2002)

=== Live albums ===
- Live at the Lobby (2021)
