= David Kitt =

Irish musician (born 1975)

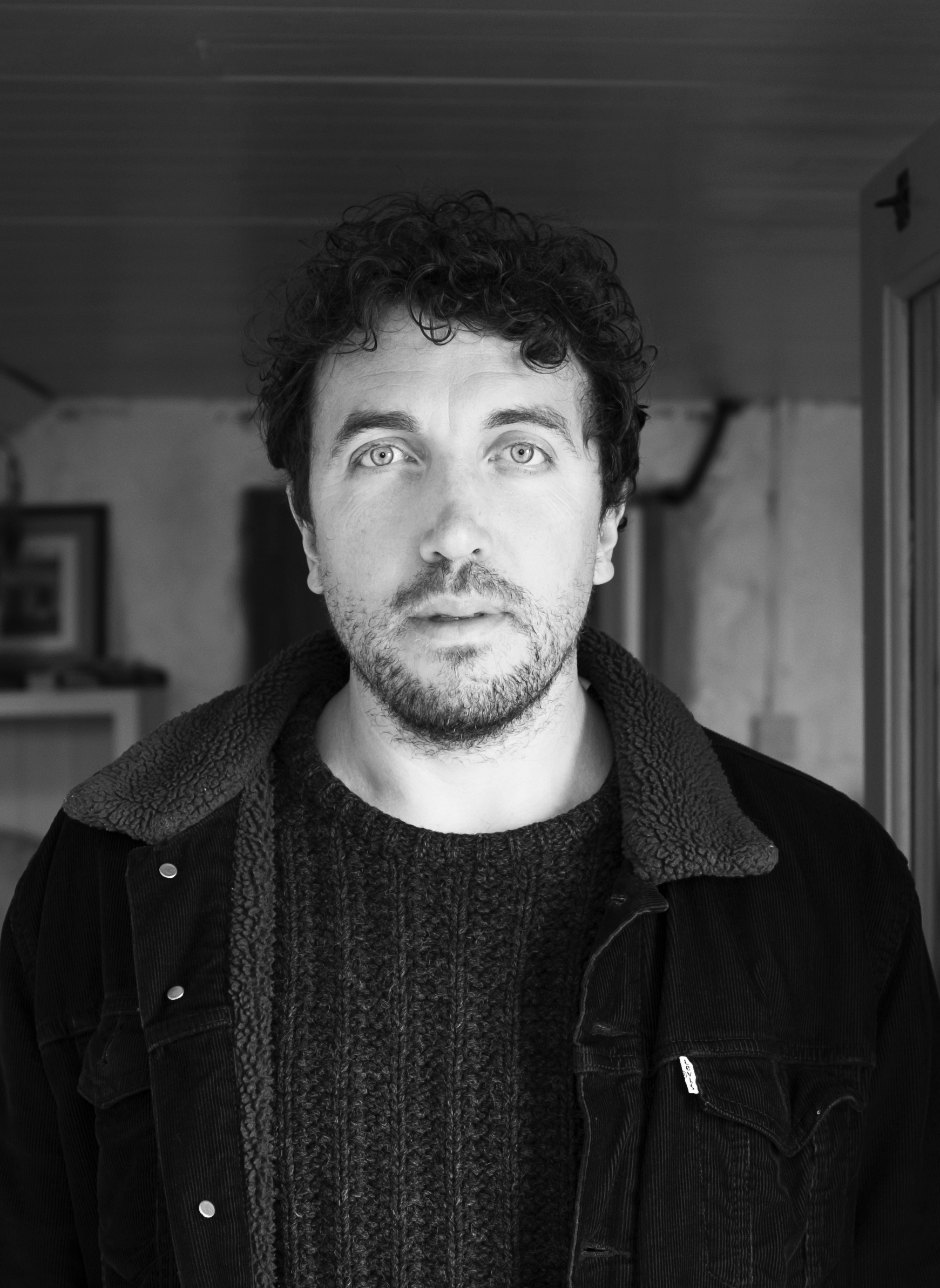

Background information
- Born: David Kitt; 1975 (age 50–51)
- Origin: Dublin, Ireland
- Genre: Indie
- Occupation: Musician
- Label: Rough Trade
- Website: davidkitt.bandcamp.com

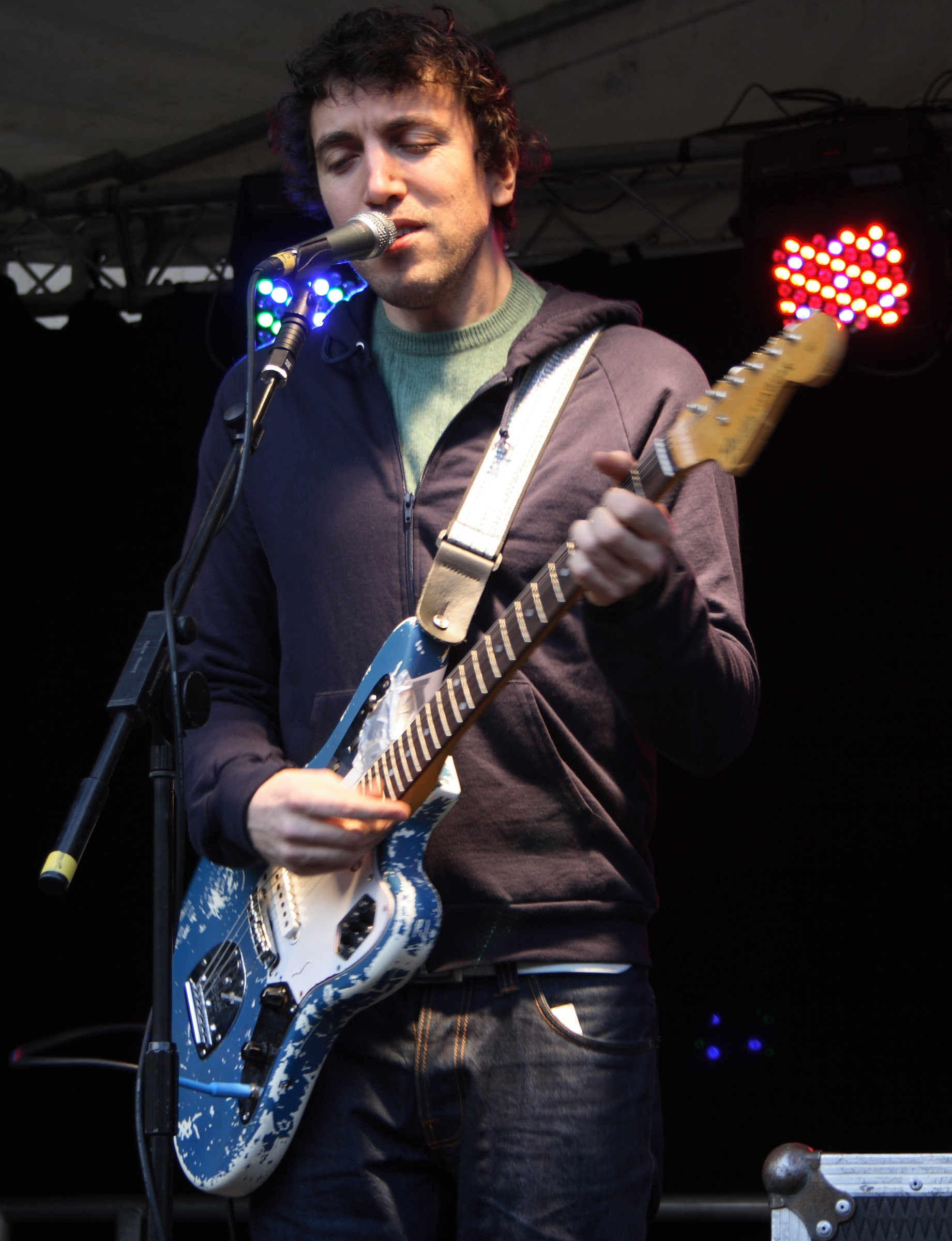
Kitt in London in 2007

David Kitt (born 1975) is an Irish musician. He has released eight studio albums to date: Small Moments, The Big Romance, Square 1, The Black and Red Notebook, Not Fade Away, The Nightsaver, Yous, and 20. He is the son of former Irish politician Tom Kitt.

== Beginnings ==
Kitt grew up surrounded by music, as his father and uncles formed a successful touring folk group when he was young. He began performing live sets while studying at Trinity College Dublin, where he completed a postgraduate course in music technology. He then recorded and mixed the seven tracks of his debut release, Small Moments, in his bedroom, releasing it in August 2000.

== The Big Romance ==
Small Moments was followed up less than a year later with The Big Romance, in May 2001. The recent success of David Gray's album White Ladder, initially on an Ireland-only release, had raised confidence among record labels in the Irish market's ability to test new singer-songwriters before going global, and it was in this environment that Kitt released his first full-length work.

This album achieved double platinum sales in Ireland, strong reviews and remains Kitt's best-known work. The reviews drew attention to Kitt's creation of a quiet, intimate atmosphere with music technologies more typically associated with dance music. British magazine NME wrote: "his music is delicately innovative, with electronica and skewed beats skipping through the sparse, home-recorded lullabies 'Song From Hope St (Brooklyn, NY)', 'Private Dance' and 'Step Outside In The Morning Light'." The Evening Herald noted that "The Big Romance is a sexy record. Unusually, it suits both late night activities as well as making the perfect dawn soundtrack... this guy is here for the long haul".

In June 2001, The Irish Times noted "the jump from band contests at Trinity College to picking up to-die-for reviews in everything from NME to Mojo might buckle lesser talents and bigger egos. Yet Kitt appears to be taking the praise and change of circumstances in his laid-back stride... Kitt has some wonderful, beautiful songs; fragile items that waft around your head and make you happy or sad as the occasion arises...."

== Subsequent work ==
Following this, Kitt's 2003 third album, Square 1, went straight to number one in Ireland and remained in that position for three weeks. Despite this success, the album failed to make the same impact in the UK, due in a large part to the lack of promotion by then label Universal. In October 2005, Kitt released The Black and Red Notebook, a collection of covers, on Rough Trade Records. This was less well-received than his earlier work, getting a two star review from The Guardian.

His next album of original material, Not Fade Away, was produced by Kitt and Karl Odlum and was issued on 30 October 2006. Kitt also released a special limited CD, Misfits Volume 1, in 2007, the first instalment in a series featuring rare and unreleased tracks which did not make his official album releases. In late September 2008, Kitt announced the title of his new album, The Nightsaver, and began promoting it by supporting Tindersticks on their Irish gigs and subsequent European tour in early 2009. The album, which was recorded, mixed and produced largely at home by Kitt with additional work by Odlum, was released on 27 March 2009 on Kitt's own Gold Spillin' Records in Ireland and as a download from his official website. In 2010 he toured with Tindersticks as a full member of the band.

== Comments on Dublin rental market ==
In 2018, Kitt re-shared an article by Una Mullally about artists not being able to afford to live in Dublin and found himself as a reluctant spokesperson for the housing crisis, partly because he pointed the finger at Fine Gael in the process. He has since acknowledged that this was a mistake and that Fianna Fáil were every bit as much to blame. He has found a way to remain in the country by living in rural areas where he can afford to have the space to continue his artistic practise.

== Discography ==
- Small Moments (2000)
- The Big Romance (2001)
- Square 1 (2003)
- The Black and Red Notebook (2004)
- Not Fade Away (2006)
- Misfits, Vol. 1 (2007)
- The Nightsaver (2009)
- Yous (2018)
- 20 (2021)
- Idiot Check (2023)

=== as New Jackson ===
- Sat Around Here Waiting EP (2013)
- From Night to Night LP (2017)
