= Woman Like a Man =

Single by Damien Rice
- Released: 2003
- Genre: Folk, indie rock, folk rock
- Songwriter(s): Damien Rice

Damien Rice singles chronology
"Volcano" (2002)	"Woman Like a Man" (2003)	""Moody Mooday/Lonelily" (2004)

"Woman Like a Man" is a single by Damien Rice, released in 2003. The track "Woman Like a Man" is not released on any regular album, however it appears as a third unlisted hidden track of the iTunes O album's "Eskimo" track and as a live version on the 2004 compilation album B-Sides.

== Track listing ==
1. "Woman Like a Man" - 4:47
2. "Delicate" - 5:12
3. "Lonelily" - 3:15
4. "The Professor" (live) - 5:07
