= Unplayed Piano =

Single by Damien Rice and Lisa Hannigan
- Released: June 2005
- Genre: Indie rock
- Label: DRM
- Songwriters: Damien Rice, Lisa Hannigan

“To be honest with you, there was no real thought process about it. They just showed me a picture of [Suu Kyi's] face and I said, Yes, I'll do it. Why? I felt a strong connection with the woman, but it's not like I fancy her, or anything..." (frowning) "Okay, that's a stupid thing to say. What I mean is... well, there is something that drew me to her and gave me, you know, hope that something could be done, but...”

— Rice struggles to cope with his feelings for Aung San Suu Kyi.

"Unplayed Piano" is a 2005 single by the Irish singer-songwriter duo Damien Rice and Lisa Hannigan. It was released in June 2005 and appeared in a total of six charts, spending a total of twenty-five weeks there. It spent twelve weeks in the Irish Singles Chart after entering on 23 June 2005, breaking into the Top 10 and achieving a peak of fourth position. It remained in fourth position for two weeks before falling to seventh position where it spent a further three weeks. The song peaked at number 24 in the UK Singles Chart and number 36 in the Eurochart Hot 100 Singles. "Unplayed Piano" was released on the DRM label and featured Rice's usual backing band of Vyvienne Long, Tom Osander and Shane Fitzsimons.

== Background ==
"Unplayed Piano" was released as a single by Hannigan and Rice to support the Free Aung San Suu Kyi 60th Birthday campaign which was running at the time. Aung San Suu Kyi is a Nobel Peace Prize winner who had been under house arrest in Burma for various periods from 2002 to 2010. She was previously placed under house arrest by the country's ruling military junta in the former capital, Yangon on 19 July 1989 under martial law that allows for detention without charge or trial for three years. She was released on 10 July 1995 but re-arrested on 23 September 2000. On 6 May 2002 she was freed after nineteen months but on 30 May 2003, following the Depayin massacre she was held in secret detention for over three months before being returned to house arrest. Despite global protests in solidarity her detention was extended by the Myanmar military junta for one year periods in 2007 and 2008. She was finally released in 2010.

Rice was approached by the United States Campaign for Burma, which asked him to donate an existing song for their Free Aung San Suu Kyi 60th Birthday Campaign. Instead Rice constructed, "Unplayed Piano", and also scheduled a live show at the London Palladium to assist in increasing the public profile of the campaign. He also gave a rare interview to The Independent to highlight the issues which inspired the song, discussing his visit to Myanmar and confessing his prior ignorance of the situation there. He wishes not to be viewed as a political activist and is "no Bob Geldof... just a regular guy who has seen something that is wrong and is trying, in some small way, to help".

The Independent described "Unplayed Piano" as "a twinkly and beautiful thing". Rice is known for refusing to openly discuss the song after becoming incensed when a friend commented that it "didn't quite measure up to the clout of his earlier work". He insists that his other songs are more powerful because they originate deeper inside him.

== Chart performance ==
"Unplayed Piano" first appeared in the Irish Singles Chart on 25 June 2005 in fourth position where it remained for a second consecutive week. The day after it first charted in Ireland the song charted in the United Kingdom at number 16. The song peaked at number 24 in the UK Singles Chart dropping out of the Top 40 at number 39. It remained in the Irish Singles Chart charting at number 7 for three consecutive weeks before dropping to number 8 on 27 July 2005. In August it charted consecutively at number 12, number 14, number 15 and number 20. The song entered the Eurochart Hot 100 Singles on 9 July 2005 at number 36 before dropping to number 52 and number 81 in the following two weeks.

| Chart (2005) | Peak position |
|---|---|
| Irish Singles Chart | 4 |
| UK Singles Chart | 24 |
| Eurochart Hot 100 Singles | 36 |
