= 9 (Damien Rice album) =

Studio album by Damien Rice
- Released: 3 November 2006
- Genre: Folk rock
- Length: 70:27
- Label: Heffa; Vector; 14th Floor; Warner Bros.
- Producer: Damien Rice

Damien Rice chronology
B-Sides (2004)	9 (2006)	Live at Fingerprints Warts & All (2007)

Singles from 9
- 1. "9 Crimes" Released: 27 November 2006; 2. "Rootless Tree" Released: 6 February 2007; 3. "Dogs" Released: 17 September 2007

9 is the second studio album by an Irish singer, songwriter and producer Damien Rice, released in 2006. The album was released on 3 November in Ireland, 6 November in the United Kingdom and 14 November in the US. It was followed by the single "9 Crimes", which was released on 27 November 2006. The record was certified gold in the UK.

== Background ==
Damien Rice had originally intended to record only one album, O, but he ended up releasing 9 at the insistence of his record company. He later said in an interview: "Now I regret that, because I would take half the songs that are on 9 off. I just don't think it's as good a record as it could be".

"Elephant" was originally titled "The Blower's Daughter Part 2". "The Blower's Daughter" is a song on Rice's first album O.

== Critical reaction ==
Professional ratings
Aggregate scores
Source	Rating
Metacritic	64/100
Review scores
Source	Rating
AllMusic	3.5/5 stars
The Guardian	2/5 stars
The Independent	2/5 stars
The New York Times	n/a
Okayplayer	3.5/5 stars
Pitchfork Media	(1.9/10)
Q	4/5 stars
Rolling Stone	3/5 stars
Slant Magazine	3.5/5 stars

The album was released to mixed critical and fan reaction. NME gave the album 4/10, describing it as "IKEA rock". Hot Press wrote "If Rice really was a nervous wounded-wing, there's no way he'd skirt as close to Nick Drake comparisons as he does on 'The Animals Are Gone'", and, in a reference to the 'noise' preceding the first track, "there's another noise that can be made out faintly but distinctly – the sound of the Grays, LaMontagnes, Johnsons and the Blunts of this world breaking their pencil tips on their jotters in sheer envy and frustration."

Both Mojo and Q gave the album 4/5. The Sunday Times made it their 'Album of the Week'. It was People's Critic Choice in November 2006.

== Sales chart performance ==
The album reached number 4 in the UK Albums Chart. In the US, it was on the Billboard 200 for 10 weeks, peaking on its debut at number 22.

== Track listing ==
All tracks are written by Damien Rice.

No.	Title	Length
1.	"9 Crimes" (Contains the hidden track "9 Crimes (Demo)" in the pregap to the first CD track. It is a rough demo of "9 Crimes" with all vocals by Rice.)	3:39
2.	"The Animals Were Gone"	5:41
3.	"Elephant"	5:57
4.	"Rootless Tree"	4:22
5.	"Dogs"	4:11
6.	"Coconut Skins"	3:45
7.	"Me, My Yoke + I"	5:57
8.	"Grey Room"	5:43
9.	"Accidental Babies"	6:34
10.	"Sleep Don't Weep" (The song ends with 16 minutes of wine glasses and a Tibetan singing bowl played by Rice.)	21:54
Total length:		70:27

== Personnel ==
- Daisy – drawing, painting
- Shane Fitzsimons – bass, double bass
- Lisa Hannigan – backing vocals
- Vyvienne Long – cello
- Cora Venus Lunny – viola, violin
- Tom Osander – drums, glasses
- Damien Rice – clarinet, Fender Rhodes, guitar, percussion, piano, production, singing bowls, vocals, wurlitzer
- Joel Shearer – electric guitar

== Charts ==
=== Weekly charts ===
Chart (2006–2007)	Peak position
Australian Albums (ARIA)	33
Belgian Albums (Ultratop Flanders)	14
Belgian Albums (Ultratop Wallonia)	53
Dutch Albums (Album Top 100)	20
French Albums (SNEP)	86
German Albums (Offizielle Top 100)	87
Irish Albums (IRMA)	1
Italian Albums (FIMI)	33
Norwegian Albums (VG-lista)	8
Spanish Albums (Promusicae)	94
Swedish Albums (Sverigetopplistan)	24
Swiss Albums (Schweizer Hitparade)	48
UK Albums (OCC)	4
US Billboard 200	22

=== Year-end charts ===
Chart (2006)	Position
UK Albums (OCC)	97
Chart (2007)	Position
Belgian Albums (Ultratop Flanders)	73
