= Not Fade Away (David Kitt album) =

Studio album by David Kitt
- Released: 18 August 2006
- Recorded: David Kitt
- Genre: Indie
- Length: 44:13
- Label: Rough Trade
- Producer: David Kitt

David Kitt chronology
The Black and Red Notebook (2002)	Not Fade Away (2006)

Professional ratings
Review scores
Source	Rating
The Irish News	5/5 stars

Not Fade Away is the fifth album recorded by Irish singer-songwriter David Kitt, and was released on 18 August 2006. The album was also nominated for the Choice Music Prize as an album of the year but lost out to The Divine Comedy's album Victory for the Comic Muse.

The album spawned the popular single, "Say No More", which received extensive airplay on national radio in summer 2006.

== Track listing ==
1. "One Clear Way" – 3:40
2. "Grey Day" – 2:49
3. "Up To You" – 3:44
4. "Sleep" – 3:50
5. "I Know The Reason" – 4:12
6. "Nothing Else" – 4:49
7. "Wish And I Won't Stop" – 2:42
8. "Guilty Prayers, Pointless Ends" – 6:23
9. "Say No More" – 2:43
10. "Don't Fuck With Me" – 4:29
11. "With You" – 4:47
