= Passenger (Lisa Hannigan album) =

Studio album by Lisa Hannigan
- Released: 20 September 2011; 7 October 2011; 4 November 2011
- Recorded: Spring 2011 at Bryn Derwen Studios in North Wales
- Genre: Folk, indie
- Label: Hoop Recordings (Ireland); Barp-ATO Records (US); Pias (UK)
- Producer: Joe Henry

Lisa Hannigan chronology
Sea Sew (2008)	Passenger (2011)	At Swim (2016)

Singles from Passenger
- 1. "Knots" Released: 12 September 2011 Ireland

Passenger is the second studio album by Irish singer-songwriter Lisa Hannigan. The album was released in the US and Canada on 20 September 2011 and in the Republic of Ireland on 7 October 2011 (brought forward from the originally scheduled date, 21 October). The album, featuring 11 new tracks, was nominated for the Choice Music Prize.

The album was self-released in Ireland and UK through her label, Hoop Records. The album was released in North America through Barp-ATO Records and later for Europe in 2012 on PIAS Recordings.

In 2012 it was awarded a silver certification from the Independent Music Companies Association, which indicated sales of at least 20,000 copies throughout Europe.

== Recording ==
Writing for the album began in late 2009 and throughout 2010 in Ireland and the US. In March 2011, Hannigan revealed the track "A Sail" as part of her "Recording Diaries" which were shot during the recording of the album in Wales. Available from her YouTube page the "Recording Diaries" gave fans the opportunity to go behind the making of the new album. "A Sail" would later be released on her website in August 2011 as a free download. The album was released in Ireland at a later date as Hannigan was on tour throughout the US in September and early October. On the track "O Sleep" it features the vocals of Ray LaMontagne.

== Singles ==
The first song available from the album "A Sail" was released as a free download in August 2011 from lisahannigan.ie. The first official single from the album was "Knots", this was released as a download on 12 September 2011 in Europe.

== Track listing ==
All tracks are written by Lisa Hannigan, except where noted

No.	Title	Writer(s)	Length
1.	"Home"	Gavin Glass, Lisa Hannigan	4:56
2.	"A Sail"		3:36
3.	"Knots"		3:31
4.	"What'll I Do"		2:51
5.	"O Sleep" (featuring Ray LaMontagne)	Glass, Hannigan	3:26
6.	"Paper House"		4:15
7.	"Little Bird"		4:00
8.	"Passenger"		4:17
9.	"Safe Travels (Don't Die)"		3:22
10.	"Nowhere to Go"	Glass, Hannigan	4:08
11.	"Flower" (iTunes version)		4:35

== Critical reception ==
Entertainment.ie gave the album 4/5 stars claiming that it was "difficult to resist the allure." Similarly, The Scotsman gave the album 4/5 stars declaring that it is "rich and (a) rewarding listen." The Irish Times gave the album another 4/5 stars. On the 7Digital download service front page, Tippy Wooder, a contributor to UK music magazine The Word, described Passenger as "expanding pleasingly on the promise of Sea Sew, with journeys (emotional and actual) being a recurring theme".

Professional ratings
Review scores
Source	Rating
Allmusic	4/5 stars
MusicOMH	4/5 stars
The Scotsman	4/5 stars
The Daily Telegraph	4/5 stars

== Tour ==
Lisa Hannigan's US and Canadian tour started on 27 September 2011 in Los Angeles she performed for seventeen dates, on this tour. In early October she announced some European dates (beginning in the UK) and, on 13 October 2011, the remaining Irish leg of the European tour was announced.

== Charts ==
Chart (2011)	Peak position
Belgian Albums Chart	48
Dutch Albums Chart	56
Irish Albums Chart	1
Irish Independent Albums Chart	1
UK Albums Chart	51
US Top Current Albums (Billboard)	165
US Folk Albums (Billboard)	6
US Heatseekers Albums (Billboard)	2
US Independent Albums (Billboard)	32

== Release history ==
Region	Date	Format	Label
Republic of Ireland	7 October 2011	CD / Download	Hoop Recordings
US & Canada	20 September 2011	CD / Download	Barp-ATO Records
United Kingdom	10 October 2011	CD / Download	Hoop Recordings
Australia & New Zealand	4 November 2011	CD / Download	PIAS via Liberator

== Awards ==
Passenger was nominated for the Choice Music Prize in January 2012.

Year	Nominee / work	Award	Result
2012	Passenger	Irish Album of the Year 2011	Nominated
