= Skylarkin' (Mic Christopher album) =

Studio album by Mic Christopher
- Released: 29 November 2002
- Recorded: 2000–2001
- Studio: Dodlum Studios
- Genre: Rock
- Length: 45:11
- Label: LOZA
- Producers: Karl Odlum, David Odlum

Skylarkin' is Mic Christopher's only solo album, which was released following his death in November 2001. The album was finalised by Karl Odlum (of Mic's old band, the Mary Janes) and David Odlum (of the Frames). Many fellow musicians from the Irish music scene contributed to the album including Glen Hansard and Colm Mac Con Iomaire of the Frames, Rónán Ó Snodaigh of Kíla, Lisa Hannigan and Gemma Hayes.

Skylarkin' entered the Irish charts at No. 39 in 2002 and in March of the following year won Best Irish album at the Meteor Awards. November 2004 saw the album achieving Platinum status in Ireland (selling over 15,000 copies). In 2005, Skylarkin' was voted #14 in the Hot Press "People's Choice" Top 100 Irish Albums of All Time.

The song "Heyday", which was released as the title track of an EP in October 2000, was used in the Guinness advertisement Quarrel, which was produced in Ireland in 2003 and starred Michael Fassbender.

== Track listing ==
1. "Heyday"
2. "Kids' Song"
3. "Listen Girl"
4. "Looking for Jude"
5. "That's What Good Friends Do"
6. "The Loneliest Man In Town"
7. "Wide Eyed and Lying"
8. "What a Curious Notion"
9. "I've Got Your Back"
10. "Skylarkin"
11. "Daydreamin'"
