= At Swim =

Lisa Hannigan's third studio album

Studio album by Lisa Hannigan
- Released: 19 August 2016
- Recorded: Hudson, New York; Dublin, Ireland
- Genre: Indie folk
- Length: 39:39
- Label: Hoop Recordings (Ireland); Pias (Worldwide)
- Producer: Aaron Dessner, Lisa Hannigan

Lisa Hannigan chronology
Passenger (2011)	At Swim (2016)

Singles from At Swim
- 1. "Prayer for the Dying" Released: 9 June 2016; 2. "Fall" Released: 9 July 2016; 3. "Ora" Released: 16 August 2016

At Swim is the third studio album by Irish singer-songwriter Lisa Hannigan. The album was released worldwide on 19 August 2016, through Hoop Recordings and Play It Again Sam.

== Background ==
Hannigan had been touring for more than two years with her 2011 album Passenger. She had imagined she would start writing new songs while touring, but "the words," she said, "just dried up." Hannigan decided to leave Dublin and travelled to Paris where she resided for a number of months. She then travelled onwards to London in an effort to overcome a period of writer's block and hoping her new adventure would inspire her to begin songwriting again. However, she failed to come up with any new material before returning to Dublin. Hannigan decided to leave Dublin and move to London more permanently. Here, she began creating new material and began putting down demos, but struggled with songwriting.

Her songwriting was finally encouraged by an unsolicited e-mail from Aaron Dessner of The National. Dessner requested Hannigan and himself should work on her new material, both artists met in Copenhagen over a weekend in an effort to come up with some ideas for the new album with particular focus on the album's theme and sound. They would both later meet up again at Lismore Castle and Cork City to tie down the album's identity.

Dessner soon became the producer of the album, sending her music and lyrics by email. Hannigan finally went to Hudson in upstate New York to begin recording.

The work of Irish poet Seamus Heaney inspired her songwriting, to the point that one of his poems Anahorish appears on the album. Themes of friendship, bereavement, homesickness and a new life in a vast city such as London have all inspired the album songs.

During the recording of the album Hannigan found herself split between Dublin and London, before some of the recording moved onto New York City.

== Singles ==
Both "Prayer for the Dying" and "Ora" have been used in promos. NPR Music debuted "Prayer for the Dying" on 8 June. The single was made available on iTunes and Spotify on 9 June 2016.

"Fall" is the first commercial single release revealed on 9 July 2016. A video for the single also appeared online the same day.

"Ora" was released on 16 August 2016 as a download. A music video for the song premiered online a day earlier. The video was directed by Jamie Hannigan and Lisa Hannigan.

== Formats ==
The album was released as a download on iTunes, with pre-orders beginning on 9 June 2016. "Prayer for the Dying" became an instant download upon pre-ordering. It was also released on CD and vinyl.

== Critical reception ==
Professional ratings
Aggregate scores
Source	Rating
Metacritic	80/100
Review scores
Source	Rating
AllMusic	4/5 stars
Consequence of Sound	B
The Daily Telegraph	4/5 stars
Exclaim!	7/10
The Guardian	4/5 stars

Writing for Exclaim!, Laura Stanley praised the album, calling it "a dream you won't want to wake up from".

== Tour ==
In the lead up to the album's release Lisa Hannigan confirmed a summer 2016 tour of Ireland.

A European tour was confirmed for autumn 2016 with dates in Ireland, Belgium, Switzerland, Italy, Germany, France and the Netherlands. She also confirmed a date for US festival Eaux Claires on 12 August.

== Track listing ==
At Swim track listing
No.	Title	Writer(s)	Length
1.	"Fall"	Lisa Hannigan, Joe Henry	3:00
2.	"Prayer for the Dying"	Hannigan	4:35
3.	"Snow"	Hannigan	3:39
4.	"Lo"	Aaron Dessner, Hannigan	3:54
5.	"Undertow"	Iain Archer, Hannigan	3:24
6.	"Ora"	Dessner, Hannigan	2:50
7.	"We, the Drowned"	Hannigan	4:00
8.	"Anahorish"	Hannigan, Seamus Heaney	1:51
9.	"Tender"	Hannigan	3:58
10.	"Funeral Suit"	Hannigan	4:01
11.	"Barton"	Dessner, Hannigan	4:27

== Charts ==
Chart performance for At Swim
Chart (2016)	Peak position
Belgian Albums (Ultratop Flanders)	50
Belgian Albums (Ultratop Wallonia)	71
Dutch Albums (Album Top 100)	31
Irish Albums (IRMA)	1
New Zealand Heatseekers Albums (RMNZ)	7
Scottish Albums (OCC)	23
Swiss Albums (Schweizer Hitparade)	72
UK Albums (OCC)	24
US Americana/Folk Albums (Billboard)	12
US Heatseekers Albums (Billboard)	8
US Independent Albums (Billboard)	29
US Top Rock Albums (Billboard)	38
