= Sea Sew =

Studio album by Lisa Hannigan
- Released: (Republic of Ireland) 12 September 2008 (United States) 3 February 2009 (United Kingdom) 4 May 2009
- Recorded: 3–16 March 2008
- Genres: Folk, indie
- Label: Hoop (Ireland) / Barp/ATO Records (US)

Lisa Hannigan chronology
Sea Sew (2008)	Passenger (2011)

Singles from Sea Sew
- 1. "Lille" Released: 25 August 2008

Professional ratings
Review scores
Source	Rating
entertainment.ie	3/5 stars
Slant Magazine	4/5 stars
RTÉ Entertainment	4/5 stars
AW Music	(mixed)
Entertainment Weekly	(B+)
The Daily Telegraph	(positive)

Sea Sew is the debut studio album released by Lisa Hannigan. It was released in Ireland on 12 September 2008, with the lead single, "Lille", made available as a free download on lisahannigan.ie on 25 August.

Sea Sew was a critical success, earning rave reviews and being named by some music critics amongst the best Irish albums of the year. It garnered airtime on American radio station KCRW and earned early praise from press across the US, including the western Los Angeles Times, which called it "charmingly idiosyncratic" and the eastern publication, The New York Times, which described it as "exquisitely ethereal". The album was nominated for the Mercury Music Prize and Choice Music Prize.

Lead single "Lille", released on 25 August 2008, became an airplay hit on Irish and American radio stations. Her song "I Don't Know" was also featured as free single of the week by iTunes UK in 2009. The admiration of Jason Mraz led to Hannigan supporting the Grammy-nominated Californian singer-songwriter on a 42-date US tour in late 2008. Hannigan signed with ATO Records in the US, where the album was released on 3 February 2009.

Sea Sew was released in the United Kingdom in May 2009, where The Daily Telegraph described it as "wonderfully creaky and raw", a record of "welcoming intimacy and ear-pleasing consistency".

== Track listing ==
All tracks are written by Lisa Hannigan except for track 7 by Bert Jansch

No.	Title	Length
1.	"Ocean and a Rock"	4:21
2.	"Venn Diagram"	4:20
3.	"Sea Song"	3:23
4.	"Splishy Splashy"	3:16
5.	"I Don't Know"	4:56
6.	"Keep It All"	4:11
7.	"Courting Blues"	4:06
8.	"Pistachio"	3:25
9.	"Teeth"	4:08
10.	"Lille"	4:06

== Recording and production ==
The album was recorded in a cold barn in the Irish countryside and produced in the studio of one of Hannigan's friends over the course of a fortnight. Jason Boshoff produced, recorded and mixed the whole album.

Prior to its release in Ireland, Hannigan previewed tracks "Lille", "Pistachio", "Some Surprise" and "Sea Song" on her MySpace page. The album also features musical personnel such as Donagh Molloy, Tom Osander, Shane Fitzsimons, Lucy Wilkins, Vyvienne Long and Gavin Glass, whilst Cathy Davey and Rhob Cunningham provided backing vocals on some of the songs.

=== Personnel ===
- Lisa Hannigan - vocals, guitar, harmonium
- Tom Osander - drums, xylophone
- Shane Fitzsimmons - bass
- Donagh Malloy - trumpet, melodica, glockenspiel
- Lucy Wilkins - violin
- Vyvienne Long - cello
- Gavin Glass - piano, harmonium
- Justin Carroll - hammond organ
- Cathy Davey - vocals
- Rhob Cunningham - vocals

=== Artwork ===
Hannigan knitted the needle-work featured on the sleeve herself along with her mother, Frances. US television host Stephen Colbert quizzed Hannigan on this when she appeared on his show The Colbert Report, asking if she had sewn the instruments as well – Hannigan is reported to be sewing Colbert a note of thanks for asking her to perform on his show.

=== Title ===
Hannigan chose to call the album Sea Sew because of the number of references to the sea in the lyrics.

== Chart performance ==
Sea Sew entered the UK Albums Chart at number 58 after an appearance on Later... with Jools Holland in May 2009.

Chart (2008)	Peak position	Certification
Irish Albums Chart	3	Platinum
UK Albums Chart	58	
US Billboard 200	135	
US Heatseekers Albums (Billboard)	3	
US Independent Albums (Billboard)	19	

== Awards ==
Sea Sew was nominated for both the Choice Music Prize and Best Irish Album at the Meteor Music Awards in January 2009, with Hannigan's artistic prowess leading to her recently obtaining tax-free status from the Office of the Revenue Commissioners in Ireland.

=== Choice Music Prize ===
Sea Sew was nominated for the Choice Music Prize in 2009. It lost to Jape's third studio album, Ritual.

Year	Nominee / work	Award	Result
2009	Sea Sew	Irish Album of the Year 2008	Nominated

=== Meteor Music Awards ===
Sea Sew led to Hannigan receiving two nominations in the Best Irish Female and Best Irish Album categories at the Meteor Music Awards in 2009.

Year	Nominee / work	Award	Result
2009	Sea Sew	Best Irish Album	Nominated
2009	Lisa Hannigan	Best Irish Female	Nominated
