= Lille (song) =

Single by Lisa Hannigan

from the album Sea Sew
- Released: 25 August 2008 (digital only)
- Genre: Indie folk
- Songwriter: Lisa Hannigan

"Lille" is the debut solo single by Lisa Hannigan, taken from her award-nominated debut album Sea Sew. It received its world premiere on Tony Fenton's Today FM show on 31 July 2008, demoed on lisahannigan.com and was later released as a free download in Ireland on 25 August 2008.

Lille became an airplay hit on Irish and American radio stations and earned the admiration of the Grammy-nominated Californian singer-songwriter Jason Mraz who invited Hannigan to support him on a 42-date US tour in late 2008. Hannigan then signed with ATO Records in the US, where her album was released in February 2009, although it is currently available from the iTunes store in the US.

Hannigan performed "Lille" on The Late Late Show on 12 September 2008.

The song was also performed at the nominations ceremony of the 2009 Mercury Prize in London when Sea Sew was shortlisted for the award. The performance preceded increased media interest in the singer in the United Kingdom.

The song is featured in the Neil Jordan film Ondine.
