= Cannonball (Damien Rice song) =

2002 song by Damien Rice

Single by Damien Rice

from the album O
- Released: 1 February 2002
- Recorded: 2000 (Monkstown, Rathgar, and Celbridge)
- Genre: Folk rock
- Length: 3:27 (radio version 1); 3:32 (radio version 2); 5:10 (album version); 4:20 (single version); 4:37 (video version)
- Label: Damien Rice (Ireland); 14th Floor (UK)
- Songwriter: Damien Rice
- Producer: Damien Rice

Damien Rice singles chronology
"The Blower's Daughter" (2001)	"Cannonball" (2002)	"Volcano" (2002)

Music video
- "Cannonball" on YouTube

"Cannonball" is a song written and performed by Irish folk singer Damien Rice. It was released on 1 February 2002, as the second single from his debut album O. It was later re-released in 2003 (reaching number 32 on the UK Singles Chart), 2004 (reaching number 19) and 2011 (reaching number 9).

== Release ==
In Ireland the single was issued as a CD maxi single in May 2002 on the artist's own label Damien Rice Music. It contained a remixed version of the track by Paul "P-Dub" Walton and Mark "Spike" Stent, plus a demo, a live track and an instrumental of the A-side. Unlike the album version, the single mix includes drums.

In Britain the single was released in October 2003 by 14th Floor Records, on a standard CD single and Enhanced CD. The Enhanced CD featured an exclusive B-side, "Moody Monday", and the music video for "Cannonball". It was packaged in a gatefold card sleeve with a poster. The second CD contained live versions of "Cannonball", "Amie" and "The Blower's Daughter", recorded live at Union Chapel. This release included four postcards. A limited edition one-track 7" single was also pressed.

The single was re-released on 5 July 2004, with an additional DVD single containing two remixes and a filmed interview and a biography, rising to #19 on its re-release.

The single versions (of which there are two, with slightly differing production) are markedly different from the original version found on the album, with background production and a quicker vocal.

== Chart performance ==
The song was originally released on 17 May 2002 and did not chart at the time.

In 2003, it reached number 32 on the UK Singles Chart on the chart of 1 November 2003, slipping back to 57 the following week for a total run of just 2 weeks in the charts.

On its re-release in 2004, the song had limited success, entering the UK Singles Chart at number 19 on 17 July 2004 and then slipping back in the charts. It had a total run of seven weeks in the charts that year. It also peaked at number 21 on the Irish Singles Chart.

The song was re-released in 2011, reaching number 13 on the Irish Singles Chart on 22 September 2011. Due to an impressive and popular X Factor audition from John Adams, singing an acoustic cover in the first round of 2011 auditions, "Cannonball" re-entered the UK Singles Chart on 24 September 2011 at number 39, and rising to 9 in the week of 1 October 2011 before slipping back in the charts.

As of December 2011, the song has sold 191,696 copies in the UK.

== Track listings ==
Irish CD

1. "Cannonball" (Single Version)
2. "Lonelily" (Original Demo)
3. "Woman Like a Man" (Live Unplugged)
4. "Cannonball" (Instrumental Album Version)

British CD

1. "Cannonball" (live)
2. "Amie" (live)
3. "The Blower's Daughter" (live)

British Enhanced CD

1. "Cannonball" (Radio Remix)
2. "Moody Monday"
3. "Cannonball" (Video)

== Charts ==
=== Weekly charts ===
Chart (2002)	Peak position
Ireland (IRMA)	21

Chart (2003)	Peak position
UK Singles (Official Charts)	32

Chart (2004)	Peak position
UK Singles (Official Charts)	19
US Triple-A (Billboard)	1

Chart (2011)	Peak position
Ireland (IRMA)	13
UK Singles (Official Charts)	9

=== Year-end charts ===
Chart (2004)	Position
US Triple-A (Billboard)	5

Chart (2011)	Position
UK Singles (OCC)	189

== Certifications ==
Region	Certification	Certified units/sales
United Kingdom (BPI)	Platinum	600,000^{‡}
^{‡} Sales+streaming figures based on certification alone.

== Little Mix version ==
"Cannonball"

Single by Little Mix
- Released: 11 December 2011
- Recorded: December 2011
- Length: 3:25
- Label: Syco; Sony
- Songwriter: Damien Rice
- Producers: Richard "Biff" Stannard; Ash Howes; Steve Mac

Little Mix singles chronology
"Wishing on a Star" (2011)	"Cannonball" (2011)	"Wings" (2012)

Audio video
- "Cannonball" on YouTube

The song was chosen as the winner's single for the eighth series of The X Factor in 2011. It was then released by girl group and X Factor champions Little Mix (formerly known as Rhythmix) on 11 December 2011, through Syco Music. It was later included on the expanded edition of Little Mix's debut album DNA (2012).

"Cannonball" reached number one on the UK Singles Chart; becoming the fastest-selling single of 2011 in the UK. By the end of the year, it had sold over 390,000 copies. The song also reached number one in Scotland and Ireland; later becoming the Christmas number one single of that year.

Rice had no involvement with the production of Little Mix's cover of "Cannonball". He proceeded to donate money to Haiti to "cleanse myself of any possible X Factor money that could come in". As of 2022, Little Mix's version had sold over 561,000 copies in the UK and has been certified gold in the country and in Ireland. It also ranks as the ninth best-selling X Factor winner's single.

=== Critical reception ===
In a positive review, Robert Copsey of Digital Spy gave the song three stars out of five, stating: "Naturally the production has been given the deluxe valet, swapping the raw acoustics of the original for a Casio keyboard piano riff, fist-clenching strings and the inevitable key change. But credit where it's due, they've played around (or as Gary put it, "Little Mixed") with it enough to distance themselves from the original."

=== Music video ===
The music video for "Cannonball" was uploaded onto Little Mix's official Vevo page on 20 December 2011. It depicts their best moments throughout The X Factor, and their performance of the single.

=== Chart performance ===
For the first time since series 1, The X Factor winner's single was not released the week of the coveted Christmas number one chart battle. The Official Charts Company announced that the 2011 Christmas number-one would be announced on Christmas Day, meaning releases on 18 December 2011 will be new entries in the chart that week. The winner's single was released in shops on 14 December 2011, which means it would have had to maintain significant sales numbers in its second week to achieve the Christmas number-one.

The song debuted at number one on the UK Singles Chart selling over 210,000 copies in its first week, becoming the fastest-selling single of the year. It is the third lowest-selling X Factor winner's single. The song has sold 465,000 copies in the UK as of December 2012.

In Ireland, the song was Christmas number one and remained at the top of the Irish Singles Chart for four weeks until it dropped to number four on 13 January.

=== Track listings ===
Digital download
No.	Title	Length
1.	"Cannonball"	3:25
2.	"Little Mix - Audio Message"	0:22

CD single
No.	Title	Length
1.	"Cannonball"	3:25
2.	"Super Bass" (X Factor performance)	2:26
3.	"E.T." (X Factor performance)	2:13
4.	"Don't Let Go (Love)" (X Factor performance)	2:33

=== Credits and personnel ===
- Damien Rice – songwriter
- Richard "Biff" Stannard – producer, keyboards, programming
- Ash Howes – producer, keyboards, programming
- Steve Mac – producer, keyboards, programming
- Chris Laws – keyboards, programming, mixing
- Dann Pursey – lead vocals, bass and drums engineering
- Jez Ashurst – programming, acoustic guitar
- Cliff Masterson – additional programming, strings and choir arrangement, conductor
- Seton Daunt – guitar
- Steve Pearce – bass
- Neal Wilkinson – drums
- Rolf Wilson – strings leader
- Diva Singers – choir
- Emma Rohan – backing vocals
- Jasette Amos – backing vocals

Credits adapted from CD single liner notes.

=== Charts ===
==== Weekly charts ====
Chart (2011)	Peak position
Europe (Euro Digital Songs)	1
Ireland (IRMA)	1
Scottish Singles Sales (Official Charts)	1
UK Singles (Official Charts)	1
UK Airplay (Music Week)	36

==== Year-end charts ====
Chart (2011)	Position
UK Singles (OCC)	41

=== Certifications ===
Certifications for "Cannonball"
Region	Certification	Certified units/sales
Ireland	—	10,000
United Kingdom (BPI)	Platinum	600,000^{‡}
^{‡} Sales+streaming figures based on certification alone.

=== Release history ===
Region	Date	Format	Label
United Kingdom	11 December 2011	Digital download	Syco Music
Ireland	11 December 2011	Digital download	Syco Music
Germany	12 December 2011	Digital download	Syco Music
Ireland	14 December 2011	CD single	Syco Music
United Kingdom	14 December 2011	CD single	Syco Music
