= En t'attendant =

Studio album by Mélanie Laurent
- Released: 2 May 2011
- Genre: Pop, rock
- Length: 50:06
- Label: Atmosphériques
- Producer: Damien Rice, Joel Shearer

Singles from En t'attendant
- 1. "En t'attendant" Released: 21 February 2011

En t'attendant is the debut studio album by the French actress and singer Mélanie Laurent, released on 2 May 2011 on Atmosphériques. Produced by Joel Shearer, it contains twelve songs, five of which are co-written and co-produced with the Irish folk musician Damien Rice.

== Track listing ==
| No. | Title | Length |
|---|---|---|
| 1. | "Début" (instrumental) | 2:40 |
| 2. | "En t'attendant" | 4:00 |
| 3. | "Everything You're Not Supposed to Be" (featuring Damien Rice) | 5:31 |
| 4. | "Circus" | 4:40 |
| 5. | "Kiss" | 3:59 |
| 6. | "Je connais" | 4:41 |
| 7. | "Pardon" | 4:01 |
| 8. | "Insomnie" | 4:07 |
| 9. | "Il fait gris" | 4:52 |
| 10. | "Uncomfortable" (featuring Damien Rice) | 5:49 |
| 11. | "Papa" | 3:35 |
| 12. | "Fin" | 2:11 |
| Total length: | | 50:06 |

== Chart positions ==
| Chart (2011) | Peak position |
|---|---|
| Belgian Albums Chart (Wa) | 22 |
| French SNEP Albums Chart | 35 |

=== Singles ===
| Year | Single | Peak chart positions |
| Year | Single | BEL |
|---|---|---|
| 2011 | "En t'attendant" | 23 |
