= O (Damien Rice album) =

Studio album by Damien Rice
- Released: 1 February 2002
- Recorded: 2001
- Genres: Folk; indie rock; acoustic rock
- Length: 61:27
- Labels: 14th Floor (Ireland/UK); Vector (US)
- Producer: Damien Rice

Damien Rice chronology
| O (2002) | B-Sides (2004) |

Singles from O
- 1. "The Blower's Daughter" Released: September 2001; 2. "Cannonball" Released: February 1, 2002; 3. "Volcano" Released: February 1, 2002

O is the debut studio album by Irish musician Damien Rice, originally released on 1 February 2002, in Ireland and in the United Kingdom. The album is dedicated to Rice's friend Mic Christopher, a musician who died of a head injury shortly before the album's release at the end of 2001.

== Background ==
Damien Rice was previously a member of the band Juniper, and upon its disbandment due to changes in creative direction, he took a sabbatical in rural Italy before returning to Ireland. He would meet with his second cousin, composer David Arnold who was impressed upon hearing Rice's songs and sent Rice's demo to music publishers to no success. Frustrated, Arnold worked with Rice to set up recording equipment for a home studio to make the album independently. He describes receiving a $500 loan from his father that would be forgiven on completion of the album. The recording process included opera singers, Gregorian chants, and a heavy influence from Lisa Hannigan, at the time Rice's personal and professional partner.

Rice wanted to release the album without the backing of a major record label, believing if he signed such a deal it would compromise his future work, forcing him to move in directions he did not wish to. The album was released as "CD-sized hardcover book filled with personal artwork, lyrics, and photos." In 2003, it would get distribution support from Vector Records for the global release, a then-newly established label focused on independent artists.

He later described his motivation as wanting "to forget about everybody else and make the next record that we're making just for ourselves again, because there's something about being in a space where you're not thinking of other people. You're just in a moment creating music and emotion and in a space with people you feel comfortable with. And that for me is the essence of what it is that we've done and what it is we do."

== Reception ==
Professional ratings
Aggregate scores
| Source | Rating |
|---|---|
| Metacritic | 80/100 |
Review scores
| Source | Rating |
| AllMusic | 4.5/5 stars |
| Blender | 4/5 stars |
| Entertainment Weekly | A |
| The Guardian | 4/5 stars |
| Mojo | 4/5 stars |
| Pitchfork | 5.4/10 |
| Rolling Stone | 3/5 stars |
| Slant Magazine | 5/5 stars |
| Spin | B− |
| USA Today | 3/4 stars |

O was released to acclaim in Europe and then globally. It peaked at number 8 on the UK Albums Chart, lasting 115 weeks on the chart, with two singles in the top 30 and "Cannonball" additionally peaking at number 9.

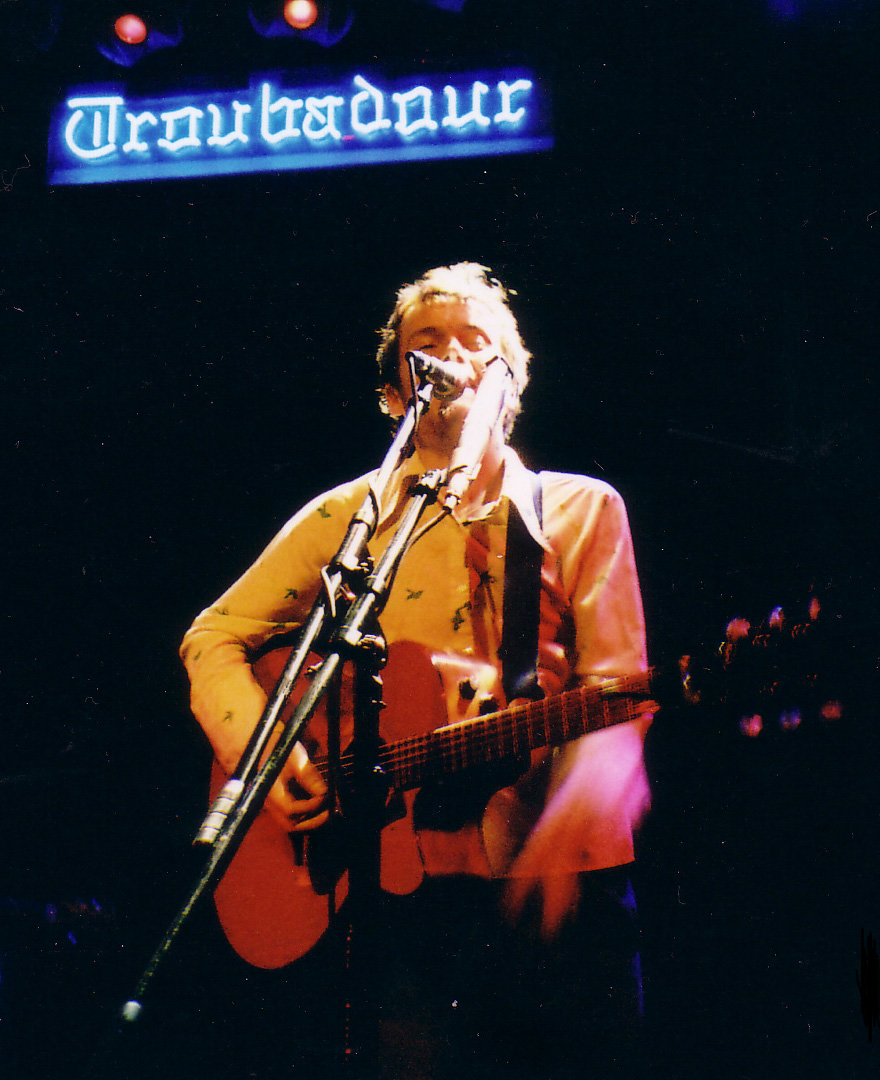
Rice on tour for O at the Troubadour in 2003

In 2003, it won the Shortlist Prize for Artistic Achievement in Music, a then-prestigious award for albums that had sold less than 500,000 copies, though it would eventually go on to receive gold certification in America.

The video for the song "Volcano" charted in the United States on VH1's Top 20 Video countdown in October 2003.

=== Legacy ===
In 2014, John Meagher of The Irish Independent described the album as, "one of the great Irish cultural success stories of the decade." In 2015, Donte Kirby of That Music Mag called it "an album that mined the vein of melancholy that comes from a relationship. If your partner just left you, if a close friend won’t pick up your calls or there’s an ache in your chest O might speak to you." In 2015, Paul Moore of Joe.IE describes the difficulty of retrospectively ranking tracks as "the whole record plays out as one incredibly atmospheric, haunting and immersive piece of music."

== Track listing ==
All tracks are written by Damien Rice, except where noted.

| No. | Title | Length |
|---|---|---|
| 1. | "Delicate" | 5:12 |
| 2. | "Volcano" (Rice, Brian Crosby, David Geraghty, Paul Noonan, Dominic Philips) | 4:38 |
| 3. | "The Blower's Daughter" | 4:44 |
| 4. | "Cannonball" | 5:10 |
| 5. | "Older Chests" | 4:46 |
| 6. | "Amie" | 4:36 |
| 7. | "Cheers Darlin'" | 5:50 |
| 8. | "Cold Water" | 4:59 |
| 9. | "I Remember" | 5:31 |
| 10. | "Eskimo" (Hidden tracks "Prague" from 7:07 to 13:00, and "Silent Night" from 14:09 to 15:57, sung by Lisa Hannigan) | 15:57 |

== Personnel ==
- Damien Rice – vocals, piano, guitar, percussion, clarinet, production
- Lisa Hannigan – backing vocals, lead vocals on "Silent Night" (hidden track), piano
- Vyvienne Long – cello
- Mark Kelly – electric guitar, production
- Shane Fitzsimons – bass guitar
- Tom Osander aka Tomo – percussion, drums
- Caroline "Caz" Fogerty – djembe
- Doreen Curran – mezzo-soprano vocals on "Eskimo"
- Nicholas Dodd – conducting
- Colm Mac Con Iomaire – violin
- Conor Donovan – timpani, percussion
- Jean Meunier – improvisation, piano

== Charts ==
=== Weekly charts ===
| Chart (2002–2005) | Peak position |
|---|---|
| Australian Albums (ARIA) | 67 |
| French Albums (SNEP) | 70 |
| German Albums (Offizielle Top 100) | 13 |
| Irish Albums (IRMA) | 2 |
| Italian Albums (FIMI) | 38 |
| Norwegian Albums (VG-lista) | 6 |
| Swedish Albums (Sverigetopplistan) | 36 |
| UK Albums (Official Charts) | 8 |
| US Billboard 200 | 114 |

| Chart (2009) | Peak position |
|---|---|
| Spanish Albums (Promusicae) | 88 |

| Chart (2025) | Peak position |
|---|---|
| Greek Albums (IFPI) | 83 |

=== Year-end charts ===
| Chart (2003) | Position |
|---|---|
| UK Albums (OCC) | 109 |
| Chart (2004) | Position |
| UK Albums (OCC) | 32 |
| Chart (2005) | Position |
| UK Albums (OCC) | 52 |

== Release history ==
After the album's initial release and success, it was repackaged several times with additional material:

- 2003 – with bonus DVD
- 2003 – includes extended version of "Eskimo", which features "Woman Like a Man" from B-Sides, and brings the track's length to 21:42.
- 2004 – with extra track "Cannonball" (Remix)
- 2004 – double album pack: O and B-Sides
- 2005 – with extra tracks "Cannonball" (Remix) and "Unplayed Piano"
- 2018 – Deluxe and Standard vinyl editions, with two O "hidden" tracks and four B-Sides tracks
