= Lisa Hannigan =

Irish musician (born 1981)

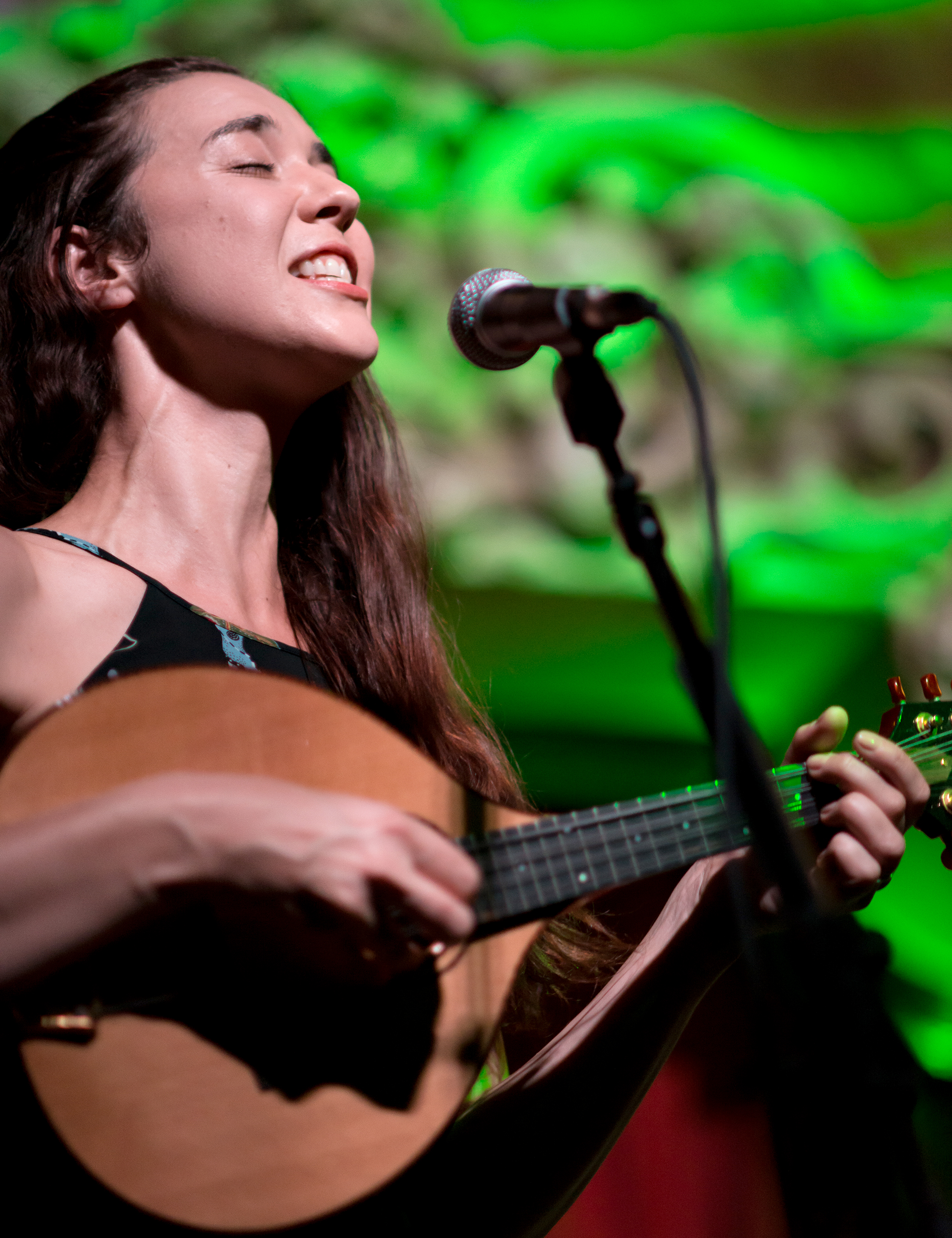
- Hannigan performing in Los Angeles in 2017
- Born: Lisa Margaret Hannigan; 12 February 1981 (age 45); Kilcloon, County Meath, Ireland
- Education: The King's Hospital
- Occupations: Musician; singer; composer; voice actress
- Years active: 2001–present
- Children: 1
- Musical career
- Genre: Indie folk
- Instruments: Vocals; harmonium; guitar; melodica; banjo; thumb piano; mandolin; bass; ukulele; glockenspiel; piano; drums; percussion
- Labels: Hoop Records (Ireland) Barp; ATO Records/Play It Again Sam (US & Worldwide); MapleMusic Recordings (Canada)
- Website: lisahannigan.ie

Lisa Margaret Hannigan (born 12 February 1981) is an Irish musician, singer, composer, and voice actress. She began her musical career as a member of Damien Rice's band. Since beginning her solo career in 2007, she has released three albums: Sea Sew (2008), Passenger (2011), and At Swim (2016). Hannigan's music has received award nominations in Ireland and the United States. Hannigan drew attention in North America for her role as Blue Diamond in Steven Universe, an animated television series created by Rebecca Sugar.

== Early life and education ==
Hannigan was born in Dublin but grew up in Kilcloon, County Meath, Ireland. She attended primary school at Scoil Oilibhéir Naofa in Kilcloon, then attended The King's Hospital, a co-educational independent school at Palmerstown, Dublin, then enrolled at Trinity College Dublin to study French and art history.

== Career ==
While in college, Hannigan met Damien Rice at a concert in Dublin in early 2001. Rice enlisted Hannigan to sing on his 2002 album O and his later album 9, featuring the hit "9 Crimes". She toured with Rice as part of his band during that period, lending vocal support and occasionally playing guitar, bass or drums.

In 2007, Hannigan returned to Dublin and began a solo career. Some of Hannigan's live recordings were available through trading networks radio shows. These recordings included: "Willy" by Joni Mitchell, "Be My Husband" by Nina Simone (from the 1965 album Pastel Blues), "Mercedes Benz" by Janis Joplin and "Love Hurts" by Boudleaux Bryant. Hannigan performed live with her own band, The Daisy Okell Quartet, and contributed guest vocals to the recordings of Mic Christopher, The Frames and Herbie Hancock.

=== Sea Sew ===
Lisa Hannigan rehearsed her debut solo album, Sea Sew, in a barn in Thomastown and recorded it in Dublin. It was released in Ireland in September 2008. The lead single, "Lille", was available as a free Internet download, and other tracks were available for preview on her Myspace page. The sleeve featured Hannigan's needle-work. Some music critics called the recording one of the best Irish albums of the year.

Sea Sew received favourable reviews in the Los Angeles Times and The New York Times. The single "Lille" was released in August 2008 on Irish and American radio stations. Hannigan performed at Electric Picnic 2008. She opened for singer-songwriter Jason Mraz on his 2008 U.S. tour.

That year she appeared on the charity album Even Better Than the Disco Thing, and performed a duet of Mick Flannery's new song "Christmas Past" with Flannery on Tony Fenton's Christmas Special on Today FM. In December 2008, she made her UK solo debut at St Johns Church in London. Hannigan signed with ATO Records in the U.S., where her album was released in February 2009.

Sea Sew was nominated for the Choice Music Prize and Best Irish Album at the Meteor Music Awards in January 2009.

That year, Hannigan appeared on The Tonight Show with Jay Leno and The Colbert Report. In 2009, Hannigan appeared on the BBC's Later... with Jools Holland, performing "I Don't Know". Sea Sew rose in the UK charts following this appearance and she performed at Glastonbury 2009 music festival and went on tour later in the year. She performed at the nomination ceremony and was greeted by confused journalists wondering "Lisa who?".

Hannigan performed at Electric Picnic 2009 Later in 2009, she toured the United States with David Gray and performed solo shows in New York, Los Angeles and London. She toured Ireland to finish the year. Hannigan's song "An Ocean and a Rock" was used in a 2009 Irish video supporting same-sex marriage entitled "Sinéad's Hand". As part of an advertisement campaign for Oxfam's Make Trade Fair, Hannigan was drenched in melted chocolate. She participated in the Irish musical collective The Cake Sale with lead vocal on the track "Some Surprise", played on the US television series Grey's Anatomy.

Hannigan contributed to the 2009 charity album Sparks n' Mind, released in aid of Aware.

In 2009, a broadcast of Other Voices was recorded.

The songs "Lille" and "Braille" from this album were used in the film Ondine in 2009.

=== Passenger ===
Hannigan recorded her second album, Passenger, at Bryn Derwen Studios in North Wales with producer Joe Henry and engineer Ryan Freeland. The album was released in the US and Canada on 20 September 2011, and on 7 October in Ireland and the UK.

Hannigan performed at the Eurosonic Festival in 2012 when Ireland was the "Spotlight Country".

=== At Swim ===
Hannigan announced that her third album was produced in collaboration with Aaron Dessner, founding member of American indie rock band The National. The album, entitled At Swim, was released on 19 August 2016. On 24 May 2016, Hannigan revealed a short teaser related to the album's launch. "Prayer for the Dying" and "Ora" appeared among promotional material in the lead up to the release. Hannigan toured Ireland extensively in the lead up to the album release. "Prayer for the Dying" appeared on digital streaming services in June 2016. The album was positively received by several newspapers, including The Guardian, which awarded it four out of five stars, commenting on Hannigan's "crystal vocals" and the album's "stunningly pretty songs with quietly powerful undertones", and the Evening Standard, which also awarded four out of five stars and mentioned the "new-found accessibility" the album represented. The Telegraph noted the album to be "subtle and gauzy but loaded with emotion", and calls Hannigan's voice "an incredible instrument, drawing on both opera and folk, with a softness and intimacy".

=== Work with Aaron Dessner and the National ===
In 2016, Aaron Dessner produced At Swim and featured Hannigan on some of his other projects. She contributed backing vocals to The National album Sleep Well Beast, was featured on four tracks on their I Am Easy to Find, and was an additional artist on First Two Pages of Frankenstein.

In 2023, Hannigan was a backing vocalist on two tracks on Ed Sheeran's album -, also produced by Dessner.

=== Soundtracks and film work ===
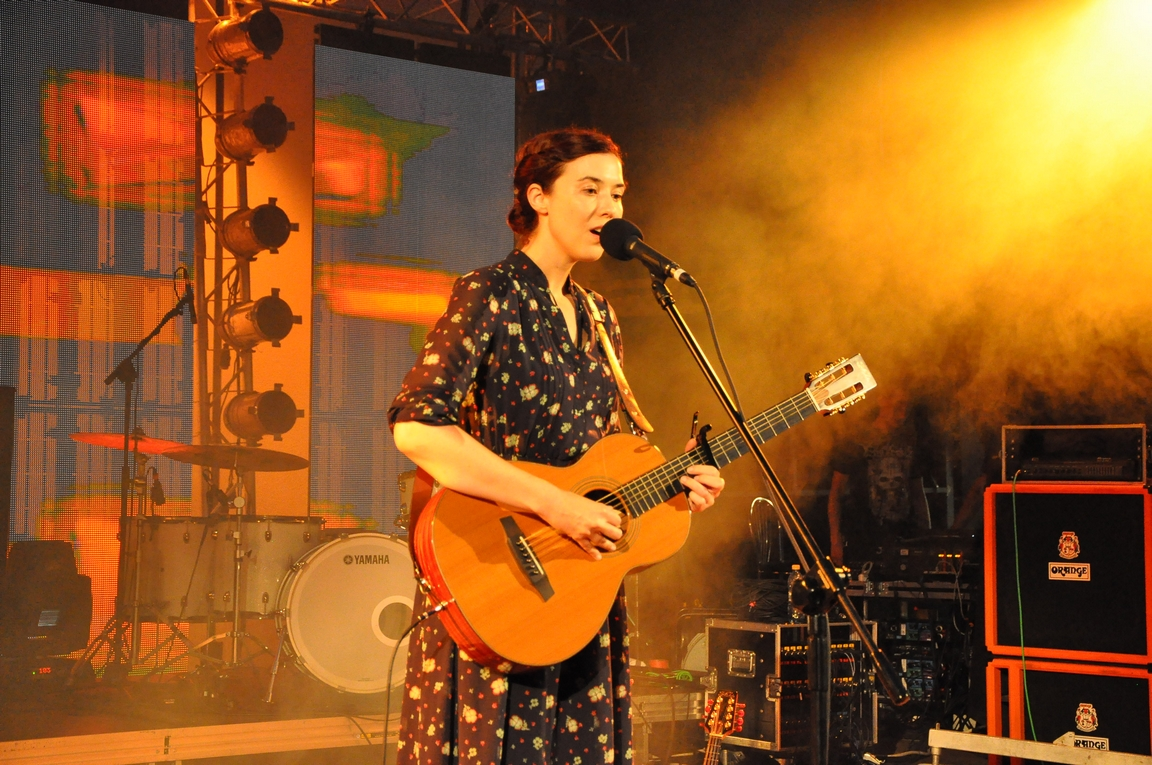
Hannigan at Halfway Festival 2014 in Białystok, Poland.

In 2004, "Cold Water", arranged and performed by Rice and Hannigan, featuring Vyvienne Long, appeared on the soundtrack for Closer.

In 2007, "9 Crimes", performed by Rice and Hannigan, appeared on the soundtrack for Shrek the Third.

In 2009, Hannigan's "Braille" and "Lille" appeared on the soundtrack for Ondine.

In 2013, Hannigan provided vocals to the soundtrack for Alfonso Cuarón's Gravity, and performed a cover of Richard Hawley's "You Haunt Me" for Another Me.

In 2014, Hannigan and John Smith contributed vocals for the Steven Price-conducted soundtrack for Fury.

In 2014, she voiced Bronagh, the Selkie mother of the main characters in the animated film Song of the Sea, and provided several songs to the film's soundtrack.

In 2015, she sang a version of "Danny Boy" for the seventh episode of the second season of Fargo.

In 2017, she started voicing the character Blue Diamond for the television series Steven Universe, created by Rebecca Sugar. She performed a cover of David Bowie's "Oh! You Pretty Things" for the closing credits of the sixth episode of the first season of Legion.

In 2018, she arranged and performed a version of the traditional Irish song "Weile Weile Waile" for the soundtrack of The Hole in the Ground.

In 2019, she reprised her role as Blue Diamond for the television film Steven Universe: The Movie. In 2020, she returned to the role in the follow-up series Steven Universe Future.

In 2023, Hannigan covered Britney Spears's "Toxic" for season 5, episode 8 of Fargo.

=== Other work ===
In 2020, Hannigan was part of the Irish collective of female singers and musicians "Irish Women in Harmony", which recorded a version of the song "Dreams" to aid the charity Safe Ireland, which deals with domestic abuse that had reportedly risen significantly during the COVID-19 lockdown.

== Reception ==
Her music has received critical praise, airplay and award nominations both in her native Ireland and the United States. In 2008, her debut album Sea Sew spawned the single "Lille", a Choice Music Prize nomination, two Meteor Music Awards nominations and a Mercury Prize nomination.

Hannigan performs using "broken-down, wheezy old instruments". Herbie Hancock said of her vocals, "there's so much jazz in the notes and phrases that she picks. She was singing the ninths, the elevenths of the chords...I mean some of the things sound like choices that Miles would have made."

== Discography ==
- Sea Sew (2008)
- Passenger (2011)
- At Swim (2016)
- Live in Dublin (with Stargazer) (2019)

== Personal life ==
Hannigan briefly studied English and art history at Trinity College Dublin. During her first week at university she became friends with Irish singer-songwriter Damien Rice. Hannigan eventually left university to travel with Rice across Europe.

Returning to Ireland, both Hannigan and Rice began to work together recording music, including songs like "Unplayed Piano" and "Once I Loved." Hannigan featured on Rice's first two solo albums and a number of EPs and live recordings. Both Irish artists toured for a number of years together and were in a relationship, but in March 2007 Rice abruptly fired Hannigan from the band the afternoon before a live show in Munich, per Hannigan, "between sound-check and gig"; she observed that by that time they were in a "very, very difficult working situation". Rice released a statement on his decision that their professional relationship had "run its creative course" in March 2007.

She and her husband have a son.

== Awards ==
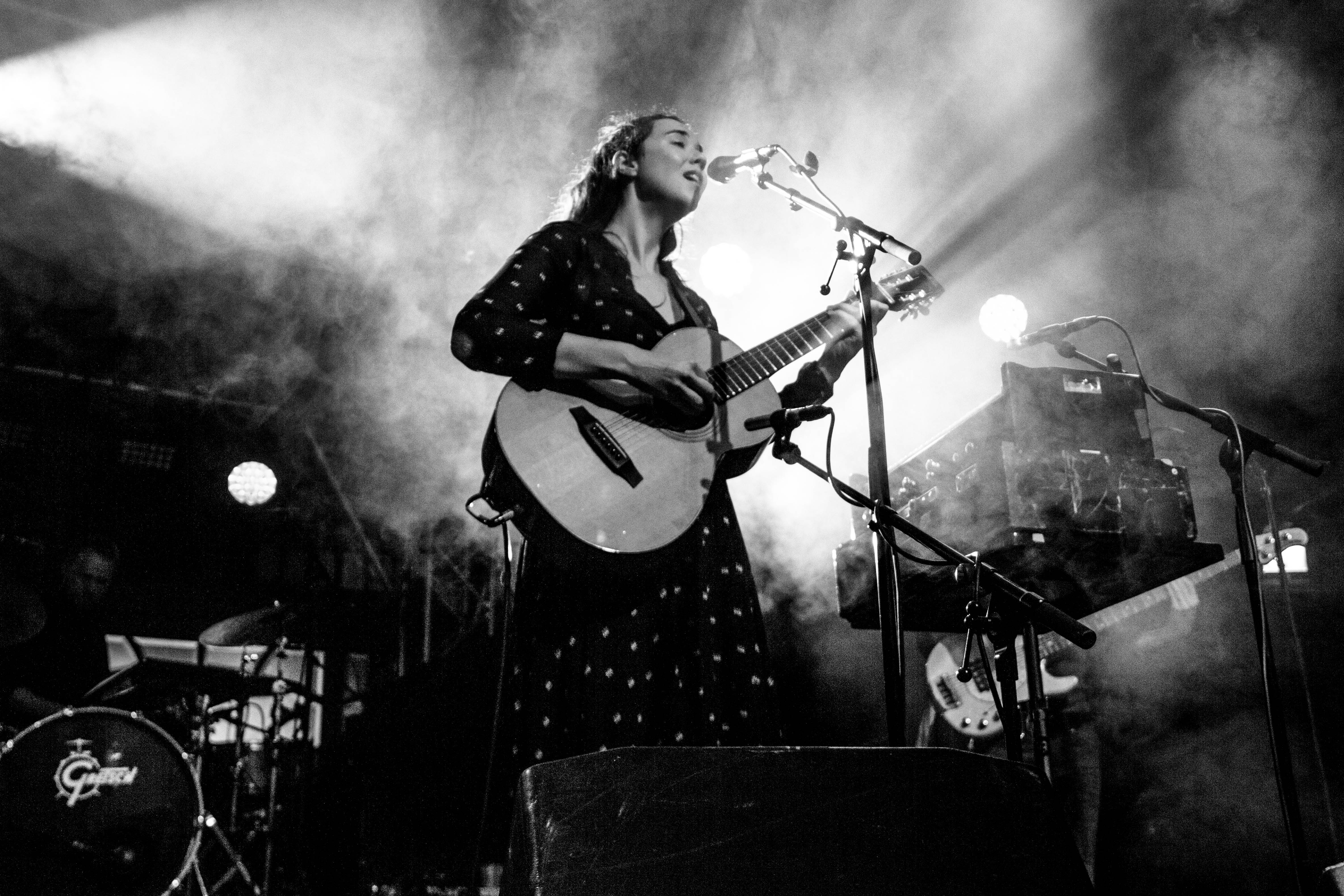
Hannigan performing at the Haldern Pop Festival in 2017

=== Hot Press Readers' Poll ===
Hannigan has four Hot Press Readers' Poll awards. She won Best Debut Album, Best Irish Album, Best Irish Track and Best Female in 2009.

Year	Nominee / work	Award	Result
2009	Sea Sew	Best Debut Album	Won
2009	Sea Sew	Best Irish Album	Won
2009	"I Don't Know"	Best Irish Track	Won
2009	Lisa Hannigan	Best Female	Won

=== Choice Music Prize ===
Hannigan's debut album, Sea Sew, was nominated for the Choice Music Prize in January 2009.

Hannigan's second album, Passenger, was nominated for the Choice Music Prize in January 2012, and she also lost out to Jape that year.

Year	Nominee / work	Award	Result
2009	Sea Sew	Irish Album of the Year 2008	Nominated
2012	Passenger	Irish Album of the Year 2011	Nominated

=== Meteor Music Awards ===
Hannigan and her work was nominated in the Best Irish Female and Best Irish Album categories at the Meteor Music Awards in 2009. She was the only solo artist nominated in more than one category at the awards. She lost to Imelda May and The Script's self-titled album respectively.

Year	Nominee / work	Award	Result
2009	Sea Sew	Best Irish Album	Nominated
2009	Lisa Hannigan	Best Irish Female	Nominated

=== Mercury Prize ===
Sea Sew was nominated for the Mercury Prize on 21 July 2009. It was Hannigan's first nomination.

Hannigan was referred to as 2009's "token folk nominee" in the UK, with the NME calling her a "token folkie". One British journalist even claimed she was "truly obscure" and part of the "moribund sensitive singer-songwriter genre". Ed Power, writing in the Irish Independent, criticised such claims, wondering if Jape (whose album Ritual beat Hannigan to the Choice Music Prize) had come close to receiving a Mercury nomination—"Or, for that matter, how many of the judges had even heard of him".

Year	Nominee / work	Award	Result
2009	Sea Sew	Best Album	Nominated

=== Postage stamp ===
On 15 July 2021, the Irish postal service, An Post, released a postage stamp celebrating Hannigan.
