= Vyvienne Long =

- Birth name: Vyvienne Long
- Origin: Ireland
- Genres: Folk, indie
- Instrument(s): Vocals, Cello, Piano
- Website: http://www.vyviennelong.com/

Vyvienne Long is a musician from County Dublin, Ireland. A classically trained cellist from the College of Music, Dublin and the Escola de Musica in Barcelona, she also sings and plays piano and writes music for her quintet which comprises 2 cellos, piano, double bass and drums.

After touring for many years with Damien Rice, Long released an EP entitled Birdtalk in 2006. Her well-known cello heavy cover version of "Seven Nation Army" appeared on Even Better than the Real Thing, Vol 2, a charity compilation of cover versions by Irish artists.

In March 2009, she released a single from her album called "Happy Thoughts". The song, originally used for a cheese ad, asks a number of whimsical questions relating to the unusual habits of various wild animals. Her debut album Caterpillar Sarabande, recorded in The Cauldron Studios Dublin, was released in Ireland and digitally on 12 March 2010.

She headlined A Gig For Haiti, a benefit concert for Oxfam in Dublin on 27 March 2010, which featured other Irish artists such as Sweet Jane, The Last Tycoons and Rob Smith.

== Discography ==
- Birdtalk (EP) released 15 September 2006
- A cover version of The White Stripes's "Seven Nation Army" on Even Better than the Real Thing Vol. 2.
- '"Happy Thoughts" (single) released 6 March 2009
- Caterpillar Sarabande (album) released 12 March 2010
- A Lifetime of High Fives (album) released 29 November 2019

== See also ==
- Damien Rice
