= Since We Met: The Best of 1996–2006 =

Since We Met: The Best Of 1996-2006

Greatest hits album by Chantal Kreviazuk
- Released: October 28, 2008
- Recorded: 1996–2006
- Length: 71:03
- Label: Sony BMG Music Canada

Chantal Kreviazuk chronology
Ghost Stories (2006)	Since We Met: The Best Of 1996-2006 (2008)	Plain Jane (2009)

Since We Met: The Best of 1996–2006 is the first compilation album by Canadian singer-songwriter Chantal Kreviazuk. Its tracks include all of her singles except for "Believer", "Hands", and "Souls".

== Track listing ==
1. "Surrounded" – 5:17
2. "In This Life" – 3:49
3. "Wonderful" – 3:33
4. "Before You" – 3:52
5. "All I Can Do" – 3:36
6. "God Made Me" – 3:11
7. "Julia" – 3:42
8. "Far Away" – 3:47
9. "Time" – 4:07
10. "Wayne" – 4:45
11. "What If It All Means Something" – 4:03
12. "These Days" - 3:55
13. "Leaving On a Jet Plane" – 4:40
14. "Weight of the World" – 3:33
15. "Dear Life" – 3:28
16. "Feels Like Home" – 4:41
17. "Ghosts of You" – 3:58
18. "In My Life" – 2:33
