= I'm Going to Break Your Heart =

- Directed by: Annie Bradley; Jim Morrison
- Produced by: Amy Green; Raine Maida; Chantal Kreviazuk
- Starring: Raine Maida; Chantal Kreviazuk
- Cinematography: Mike McLaughlin
- Edited by: Nick Bradford; Kevin Lavelle; Michael P. Mason; Avner Shiloah
- Music by: Raine Maida; Chantal Kreviazuk
- Production company: Arc49 Entertainment
- Distributed by: Crave
- Release date: May 23, 2019
- Running time: 90 minutes
- Country: Canada
- Language: English

I'm Going to Break Your Heart is a Canadian documentary film, directed by Annie Bradley and Jim Morrison and released in 2019. The film profiles musicians Raine Maida and Chantal Kreviazuk on a retreat in St. Pierre and Miquelon, detailing both their collaboration on the joint album Moon vs. Sun and their efforts to work on the fractures and conflicts that had emerged in their 19 years of marriage.

The film had select theatrical screenings before premiering on Crave in May 2019.

Reviewing the film for The Georgia Straight, Ken Eisner opined that while Maida and Kreviazuk appeared to have been attempting to make a version of Once, the 2007 drama film starring Glen Hansard and Markéta Irglová, the film instead played like a marginally more hopeful version of The Swell Season, the later documentary film about the dissolution of Hansard and Irglová's marriage.

The film received a Canadian Screen Award nomination for Best Biography or Arts Documentary Program or Series at the 8th Canadian Screen Awards in 2020.
