= Colour Moving and Still =

Studio album by Chantal Kreviazuk
- Released: October 5, 1999
- Genre: Adult alternative
- Length: 41:06
- Label: Columbia
- Producer: Jay Joyce

Chantal Kreviazuk chronology
Under These Rocks and Stones (1996)	Colour Moving and Still (1999)	What If It All Means Something (2002)

Professional ratings
Review scores
Source	Rating
AllMusic	3/5 stars
Amazon.com	5/5 stars

Colour Moving and Still is the second studio album by Canadian singer and songwriter Chantal Kreviazuk. It was released on October 5, 1999, by Columbia Records. A special edition of the album is also available with a bonus disc. An edition of the album released in Taiwan includes all of the tracks of the album, as well as all of the tracks on the bonus disc released on one disc.

== Track listing ==
All songs written by Chantal Kreviazuk, with co-writers as shown.

1. "Blue" – 4:58
2. "Dear Life" (Kreviazuk, Raine Maida) – 3:29
3. "Until We Die" – 3:55
4. "Souls" – 5:09
5. "Before You" (Kreviazuk, Jay Joyce) – 3:53
6. "M" – 4:00
7. "Soul Searching" – 3:26
8. "Far Away" (Kreviazuk, Chris Burke-Gaffney) – 3:49
9. "Eve" – 3:46
10. "Little Things" (Kreviazuk, Maida) – 4:35

=== Bonus disc ===
1. "Leaving on a Jet Plane" (John Denver) – 4:40
  - featured on the soundtrack for the movie Armageddon
2. "Feels Like Home" (Randy Newman) – 4:40
  - featured on the soundtrack for the television show Dawson's Creek
3. "In My Life" (John Lennon, Paul McCartney) – 2:33
  - theme song for the NBC television show Providence

=== Singles ===
- "Leaving on a Jet Plane" (bonus track)
- "Feels Like Home" (bonus track)
- "Before You"
- "Dear Life"
- "Souls"
- "Far Away"

== Personnel ==
- Chantal Kreviazuk – piano, vocals, Wurlitzer
- Matt Chamberlain – drums
- Luke Doucet – acoustic guitar
- Chris Feinstein – bass guitar
- Jay Joyce – bass, guitar, electric guitar, keyboards, baritone guitar
- Giles Reaves – organ, keyboards, tambourine, snare drums
- Jeremy Taggart – drums

== Production ==
- Producer: Jay Joyce
- Engineers: Everett Ravestein, Giles Reaves, Blair Robb Assistant, Rick "Soldier" Will
- Digital engineer: Giles Reaves
- Assistant engineer: Everett Ravestein
- Mixing: Kevin Killen, Giles Reaves
- Mastering: Bob Ludwig
- Programming: Jay Joyce
- Loop programming: Giles Reaves
- A&R Direction: Mike Roth
- Production coordination: Tanya Nagowski
- Art direction: Gail Marowitz
- Design: Alice Butts

== Charts ==
Chart (1999)	Peak position
Canadian Albums (Billboard)	5

=== Year-end charts ===
Chart (2000)	Position
Canadian Albums (Nielsen SoundScan)	135
