= Plain Jane (album) =

Studio album by Chantal Kreviazuk
- Released: October 13, 2009
- Recorded: 2008–2009
- Genre: Adult contemporary
- Length: 38:51
- Label: MapleMusic Recordings
- Producer: Raine Maida

Chantal Kreviazuk chronology
Since We Met: The Best of 1996-2006 (2008)	Plain Jane (2009)	Hard Sail (2016)

Plain Jane is the fifth studio album by Canadian singer-songwriter Chantal Kreviazuk. The album was released on October 13, 2009 in Canada; it was Kreviazuk's first release through MapleMusic Recordings.

== Background ==
Named after the track "Plain Jane", the title reflects Kreviazuk's feelings about living a double life. Splitting time between her native Canada and the United States, Kreviazuk lives a mostly anonymous life in California primarily as a working mother, while she leads a more public life in Canada as an established and recognizable singer songwriter.

The song "5000 Days" is considered by Kreviazuk to be a continuation of her 1999 Colour Moving and Still track "Until We Die".

== Album information ==
Plain Jane features a guest appearance by jazz musician Chris Botti on the title track, performing on the trumpet. Kreviazuk previously made a guest appearance on Botti's 2003 album A Thousand Kisses Deep, providing vocals for the track "The Look of Love".

The closing track, "Na Miso", contains lyrics in an African language(Swahili) about connecting with loved ones. The song was written by and features vocals from Kreviazuk and Bibiane Mpoyo, a nanny of the family.

Two bonus tracks were available through the iTunes Store. "Backfires" can be purchased with the iTunes version of the album, while "Seclusion" was available only through the pre-order of the album.

== Promotion ==
"Invincible" was used in a commercial for Garnier Nutrisse, for which Kreviazuk is the spokesmodel. It was released in Canada and peaked at #60 on the Canadian Hot 100.

On July 9, 2009, as partnership with Garnier Nutrisse Cream, Garnier Canada's website offered a free exclusive download of "Ordinary People" along with the chance to win tickets to one of Kreviazuk's upcoming shows.

On July 15, 2009, a short video clip was posted on YouTube and MySpace of Kreviazuk recording "Today" in the studio.

"Today" was featured in the movie Blue Crush 2.

== Track listing ==
No.	Title	Writer(s)	Length
1.	"Invincible"	Chantal Kreviazuk, Raine Maida	3:35
2.	"Half of Me"	Kreviazuk	3:25
3.	"Ordinary People"	Kreviazuk, Maida	3:41
4.	"5000 Days"	Kreviazuk	4:10
5.	"Today"	Kreviazuk, Maida	3:21
6.	"The Way"	Kreviazuk	3:26
7.	"Plain Jane"	Kreviazuk	4:44
8.	"Say the Word"	Kreviazuk	3:30
9.	"Kerosene Lamp"	Kreviazuk, Brett James	3:43
10.	"Halfway Around the World"	Kreviazuk	3:42
11.	"Na Miso"	Kreviazuk, Bibiane Mpoyo	1:30

=== iTunes bonus tracks ===
1. "Backfires" – 3:19
2. "Seclusion" – 3:05 (Available with preorder only)

=== Singles ===
- "Invincible"
- "Half of Me"
- "The Way"

== Personnel ==
- Chantal Kreviazuk - piano, vocals, keyboards, synth bass
- Randy Cooke - drums, percussion
- Jon Button - bass guitar
- Lenny Solomon - violin
- Sandy Baron - violin
- Eric Paetkau - viola
- Kevin Fox - cello
- David Schwartz - stand-up bass on "Plain Jane"
- Chris Botti - horns on "Plain Jane"
- Raine Maida - acoustic guitar on "Say the Word"
- Bibiane Mpoyo - additional vocals on "Na Miso"
- Sonia Lee - violin on "Na Miso"

== Production ==
- Producer - Raine Maida
- Engineer - Raine Maida
- Assistant engineer - Dusty Schaller
- Digital editors - Raine Maida, Dusty Schaller
- Mixing - Raine Maida, Andrew Scheps
- Mastering - Bob Boyd
- String arrangements - Kevin Fox
- Strings engineer - Samuel Ibbett
- Graphic design - John Rummen
- Photography - Raphael Mazzucco
