= What If It All Means Something =

2002 album by Chantal Kreviazuk

Studio album by Chantal Kreviazuk
- Released: December 24, 2002
- Recorded: 2002
- Genre: Adult alternative
- Length: 46:45
- Label: Columbia
- Producer: Gregg Wattenberg

Chantal Kreviazuk chronology
Colour Moving and Still (1999)	What If It All Means Something (2002)	Ghost Stories (2006)

Singles from What If It All Means Something
- 1. "In This Life" Released: 2003; 2. "Julia" Released: 2003; 3. "Time" Released: 2003

Professional ratings
Review scores
Source	Rating
Allmusic	3/5 stars

What If It All Means Something is the third studio album by Canadian singer-songwriter Chantal Kreviazuk, released in 2002. It is her only album to date to chart on the Billboard 200, peaking at #119 in 2003.

== Composition ==
According to MTV Taiwan, the album reflects Kreviazuk's personal emotions during the period leading up to its release by implementing folk-inspired piano and her own guitar. "In This Life" describes unconditional love and "selfless dedication. Kreviazuk revealed that "Flying Home (Brenda's Song)" was about her cousin, Brenda, who died at a young age.

== Track listing ==
All songs written by Chantal Kreviazuk unless otherwise noted.

No.	Title	Writers	Length
1.	"In This Life"		3:51
2.	"Time"	Kreviazuk, Raine Maida, Gregg Wattenberg	4:07
3.	"What If It All Means Something"	Kreviazuk, Maida	4:07
4.	"Julia"	Kreviazuk, John O'Brien	3:43
5.	"Flying Home (Brenda's Song)"		3:18
6.	"Weight of the World"		3:33
7.	"Waiting"	Kreviazuk, Maida	4:29
8.	"Ready for Your Love"	Kreviazuk, Gerald Eaton, Prophet B.W. West	3:38
9.	"Morning Light"		3:57
10.	"Miss April"	Kreviazuk, Maida	3:38
11.	"Turn the Page"		3:47

=== US bonus track ===
No.	Title	Writers	Length
12.	"Feels Like Home"	Randy Newman	4:41

=== Japan bonus tracks ===
No.	Title	Writers	Length
12.	"Feels Like Home"	Randy Newman	4:41
13.	"Leaving on a Jet Plane"	John Denver	4:41
14.	"This Year"	Billy Steinberg, Marti Frederiksen, Leah Andreone	2:45

== Personnel ==
- Chantal Kreviazuk – piano, keyboards, vocals
- Jeff Allen – bass guitar
- Sherrod Barnes – acoustic guitar, guitar, electric guitar
- Michelle Branch – background vocals
- Avril Brown – violin
- Cenovia Cummins – violin
- Sylvia Davanzo – violin
- Jamie Edwards – acoustic guitar, guitar, electric guitar, keyboards
- Ralph Farris – conductor, viola
- David Gold – viola
- Adam Grabois – cello
- Joyce Hammann – violin
- Conrad Harris – violin
- Adam Hyman – viola
- John Kalodner – voices
- Conway Kuo – viola
- Victor Lawrence – cello
- Dorothy Lawson – cello
- Gerry Leonard – guitar, electric guitar
- Shawn Pelton – percussion, drums
- Todd Reynolds – violin
- Mary Rowell – violin
- Gregg Wattenberg – guitar, mandolin, electric guitar
- Mary Whitaker – violin
- Krystof Witek – violin
- Paul Woodiel – violin

== Production ==
- Producer: Gregg Wattenberg
- Engineers: Ross Petersen, Brian Scheuble, Gregg Wattenberg, Chuck Zwicky
- Assistant engineers: Peter Doris, Ricardo Fernandez, Femio Hernández, Claudius Mittendorfer, Ross Petersen
- Mixing: Tom Lord-Alge, Brian Malouf
- Mastering: Dave Donelly
- A&R: Mike Roth
- Programming: Shawn Pelton
- Guitar technician: Art Smith
- Arrangers: Chantal Kreviazuk, Gerald Eaton, Jamie Edwards, Ralph Farris, Brian West
- Score: Ralph Farris
- Orchestra contractor: Victor Lawrence
- Art direction: Gail Marowitz
- Design: Michelle Holme
- Photography: Raphael Mazzucco

== Soundtracks ==
- "Time" was featured in the end credits of the film Uptown Girls
- "Weight of the World" was featured on the TV series Charmed

== Reception ==
MTV Taiwan also describes "Ready For Your Love" having a "rich oriental style". The channel also described "Julia" and "Miss April" shows the "irony of fame", "Weight of the World" "conveys the need for forgiveness".

== Charts ==
Album – Billboard (North America)

Year	Chart	Position
2003	Heatseekers	2
2003	The Billboard 200	119
2003	Top Heatseekers	2

Singles – Billboard (North America)

Year	Single	Chart	Position
2003	"In This Life"	Adult Top 40	17

== See also ==
- 2002 in music
