= Chris Burke-Gaffney =

Canadian songwriter and producer

Chris Burke-Gaffney, also known as CBG, is a Canadian songwriter, producer, and artist manager. Burke-Gaffney also oversees the day-to-day operation of CBG Artist Development.

== History ==
Burke-Gaffney started his career as singer/bassist for The Pumps (Polygram). He signed his first record deal as a teenager and toured with acts like Triumph, Guns N' Roses, and AC/DC. In his early twenties, he wrote his first top-ten single, "Miracle", for Orphan. His early songs continue to receive heavy airplay on classic rock radio.

Chris formed CBG Artist Development to manage and develop singer/songwriter Chantal Kreviazuk. He co-wrote / produced her Juno Award-winning and triple-platinum album, Under These Rocks and Stones. He also acted as her manager and partnered with The Peter Asher Mgmnt firm in LA.

Over the next decade CBG developed, managed and produced a number of artists including, soul/pop duo McMaster & James (BMG), teenage, funk/soul prodigy Kyle Riabko (Aware/Sony) and Country artists, The Keats and MacKenzie Porter who exploded in Canada in 2015 with a Juno nomination, a CCMA nomination and 3 radio hits, including "If You Asked Me To", co-written by CBG.

He continues to write, produce and develop talent working out of Nashville, LA and his home in East St. Paul, Canada where he lives with his wife, Jewls.

Songs written by Burke-Gaffney have been used in numerous movies and television shows including Chicago Hope, Malcolm in the Middle, The Real World, Heartland and Providence.

== Awards and recognition ==
Best Aboriginal Recording (Eagle & Hawk, Juno Awards), Album Of The Year and Best Folk Album (Little Hawk Aboriginal Music Award), Manager of The Year (2000, 2001, 2002 - PMA Awards), Manager of The Year (2005 - WCMA Awards), SOCAN Songwriter Award for the smash hit "Thank You" in 2001, the 2nd most airplay in Canada after Celine Dion. Topped the Australian Country radio chart with the #1 single, "Serves You Right" in 2011, MCMA Songwriter of The Year 2017, Juno Nomination for Indigenous Recording 2018.

== See also ==
- The Pumps and Orphan (Official Website)
- CBG Artist Development Personnel Profiles
- Songwriters Association of Canada: Chris Burke-Gaffney (Director)
