= Invincible (Chantal Kreviazuk song) =

Single by Chantal Kreviazuk

from the album Plain Jane
- Released: 2009
- Length: 3:34
- Songwriter(s): Chantal Kreviazuk, Raine Maida

"Invincible" is a song by Chantal Kreviazuk and first single from her 2009 album, Plain Jane.

== Charts ==
Chart (2010)	Peak position
Canadian Hot 100	60
