= Ghost Stories (Chantal Kreviazuk album) =

Studio album by Chantal Kreviazuk
- Released: August 29, 2006
- Recorded: 2005–2006
- Length: 42:11
- Label: Sony BMG Canada
- Producers: Chantal Kreviazuk; Raine Maida

Chantal Kreviazuk chronology
What If It All Means Something (2002)	Ghost Stories (2006)	Since We Met: The Best of 1996-2006 (2008)

Professional ratings
Review scores
Source	Rating
Allmusic	4/5 stars

Ghost Stories is the fourth studio album by Canadian singer/songwriter Chantal Kreviazuk, released on August 29, 2006. The first single released from the album was "All I Can Do". The second was "Wonderful" and the third was "Ghosts of You".

The album, produced entirely by Kreviazuk's husband, Our Lady Peace member Raine Maida, does not have a single guitar on any of the tracks. According to Kreviazuk, most of the album has a gospel theme to it.

The album debuted at #2 on the Canadian Albums Chart making it Chantal Kreviazuk's highest charting album of her career. Less than a month later, the album was certified Gold by the CRIA.

On March 9, 2007, the album was released on the iTunes Store as Ghost Stories (With Interview Tracks); this edition includes additional songs and about 30 minutes of interviews with Kreviazuk.

== Track listing ==
1. "Ghosts of You" – 3:58
2. "All I Can Do" – 3:36
3. "Spoke In Tongues" – 3:13
4. "Mad About You" – 3:46
5. "So Cold" – 2:20
6. "Waiting For The Sun" – 3:48
7. "You Blame Yourself" – 4:08
8. "Grow Up So Fast" – 3:27
9. "Wonderful" – 3:33
10. "Asylum" – 4:13
11. "Wendy House" – 6:09

=== USA bonus tracks ===
1. "Time" – 4:06 (Originally from the album What If It All Means Something)
2. "I Do Believe" – 3:55 (Co-written and co-produced by Brian West & Gerald Eaton)

=== USA bonus disc ===
1. "God Made Me (Live)" – 3:26
2. "Wayne (Live)" – 5:26

=== Singles ===
- "All I Can Do"
- "Wonderful"
- "Ghosts of You"

== Personnel ==
- Chantal Kreviazuk – vocals, piano, bass guitar
- Chris Chaney – bass guitar
- Jason Lader – bass guitar
- Raine Maida – bass guitar
- Trey Henry – double bass
- Earl Harvin – drums
- Randy Cooke – drums, percussion
- Lenny Castro – percussion
- The Section Quartet
  - Eric Gorfain – strings
  - Daphne Chen – strings
  - Richard Dodd – strings
  - Leah Katz – strings
