= Nick August-Perna =

American documentary filmmaker

- Born: Madison, Wisconsin, U.S.
- Occupations: Director, editor, producer
- Years active: 2009–present

Nick August-Perna is an American documentary filmmaker.

== Life and career ==
August-Perna was born in Madison, Wisconsin and graduated from New York University Tisch School of the Arts. In 2011, he co-directed The Swell Season, along with Chris Dapkins and Carlo Mirabella-Davis, which premiered at the Tribeca Film Festival.

August-Perna is the recipient of the 2016 Soros Justice Fellowship from the Open Society Foundations. In 2017, he edited and produced the documentary short film Knife Skills, which was nominated for the Academy Award for Best Documentary Short Subject at the 90th Academy Awards. In 2023, he directed and produced Tell Them You Love Me, which premiered on Netflix.

== Selected filmography ==
Year	Title	Contribution	Note
2024	Photographer	Editor	2 episodes
2023	Tell Them You Love Me	Director and producer	Documentary
2021	The Oxy Kingpins	Director and producer	Documentary
2020	No Passport Required	Director	2 episodes
2017	The Talk: Race in America	Editor	Documentary
2017	Knife Skills	Editor and co-producer	Documentary
2016	Sacred	Editor	Documentary
2016	The Ruins of Lifta	Editor	Documentary
2015	Colliding Dreams	Editor	Documentary
2012	Birders: The Central Park Effect	Co-producer	Documentary
2011	The Swell Season	Co-director and editor	Documentary

== Awards and nominations ==
Year	Result	Award	Category	Work	Ref.
2024	Nominated	Miami International Film Festival	Best Documentary	Tell Them You Love Me	
2023	Won	Hamptons International Film Festival	Best Documentary Feature	Tell Them You Love Me	
2023	Won	Montclair Film	New Jersey Films Competition	Tell Them You Love Me	
2011	Nominated	CPH:DOX	Sound & Vision Award	The Swell Season	
