= Forever (Aled Jones album) =

Studio album by Aled Jones
- Released: 26 September 2011
- Length: 49:18

Aled Jones chronology
Aled's Christmas Gift (2010)	Forever (2011)

Forever is a studio album by Aled Jones and is his first non-seasonal studio album in four years. This album reached number 46 in the UK Album Chart.

== Track listing ==
1. Majesty
2. Feels Like Home
3. Bridge Over Troubled Water
4. A Living Prayer - Duet with Beth Nielsen Chapman
5. Forever
6. Hushabye Mountain
7. Let It Be Me
8. The First Time Ever I Saw Your Face
9. We Can Be Kind
10. Footprints
11. I Will
12. Better Than I
13. That'll Do
