= Hard Sail =

Studio album by Chantal Kreviazuk
- Released: June 17, 2016
- Label: Warner Music Canada

Chantal Kreviazuk chronology
Plain Jane (2009)	''Hard Sail'' (2016)

Hard Sail is the sixth studio album by Chantal Kreviazuk. It was released on June 17, 2016. A single, "Into Me", was released in October 2015. A second song from the album, "All I Got", was released as a single on May 6, 2016.

Kreviazuk says at least two songs on the album, "Lost" and "I Love You", were inspired by recent traumatic real-life experiences. "It involved going through a bit of shock and PTSD and witnessing something pretty difficult and graphic," she said. Kreviazuk says within days of the incident she arranged for some studio time, intending to use music to help her process the event. The song "Lost" was composed on the spot while the engineer recorded her performance. "I Love You" was written later in her recovery as she reflected on the assistance she received in this period from her husband Raine Maida. Kreviazuk previously performed "I Love You" in 2013 at a gala in a Fourth of July celebration in Vancouver, with the song recorded in only two hours. Kreviazuk also revealed, in an interview with Interview magazine, the song "Vicious" was about the trafficking of sex slaves by the Islamic State of Iraq and the Levant extremist group.

== Track listing ==
No.	Title	Length
1.	"Hard Sail"	3:49
2.	"All I Got"	3:09
3.	"Into Me"	3:17
4.	"Vicious"	3:49
5.	"Lost"	4:15
6.	"Meant for This"	3:36
7.	"Snowing in the Desert"	3:33
8.	"Ticklish"	3:44
9.	"I Love You"	4:21
10.	"Smile in your Sleep"	2:03
