= Tell Them You Love Me =

2024 true-crime documentary film

- Genre: True crime documentary
- Directed by: Nick August-Perna
- Original language: English

Production
- Executive producer: Louis Theroux

Original release
- Network: Netflix

Tell Them You Love Me is a documentary film that details the case against Anna Stubblefield, a Rutgers University professor convicted in 2015 of sexually abusing Derrick Johnson, a nonverbal person with cerebral palsy whom she was allegedly supporting through facilitated communication. After struggling to find a distributor in the United States, it was eventually released through Netflix.

== Description ==
Anna Stubblefield and Derrick Johnson first met in 2009. Johnson's mother and brother were convinced that he longed to express himself and Stubblefield offered to use facilitated communication to help with this. This took the form of Stubblefield assisting Johnson to type on a keyboard as a means of communication. Scientists say there is no evidence that the source of the message is the disabled person rather than the facilitator. Eventually Stubblefield ended up sexually assaulting Johnson in her office, with Stubblefield claiming they were in love. Stubblefield was suspended from the university and convicted of sexual assault in 2015 but later released after an appeal.

Netflix said the documentary explored "the controversial relationship between a professor and a nonverbal man that leads to a trial over race, disability and power." Writing for Tudum, Ingrid Ostby said the film told the story of how a "relationship between a married White professor and a Black man with cerebral palsy sparks controversy when the man's mother alleges that her son was incapable of consent—leading to a nationwide debate over power dynamics, disability, and race."

== Production ==
Tell Them You Love Me takes place in Irvington and West Orange, New Jersey, and was directed by Nick August-Perna. It is rated TV-14.

== Reception ==
The Guardian reported that the film is a "disturbing tale of a White female academic's sexual abuse of a non-verbal Black man – and uses it to lay bare society's prejudices", and that in addition to its exploration of facilitated communication, the film "is just as striking as a study in White privilege and White female victimhood – where good intentions are consistently assumed of Stubblefield." In a positive review, the paper concluded, "Beyond consent, disability and race, there is space given to reflect upon the nature of language, the 'white saviour' complex, the purpose of justice and what constitutes unconditional love. Tell Them You Love Me might be a hard watch, but it is also a vital one."

The Daily Beast wrote that "though [Stubblefield] comes across as sincere, that's not the same thing as innocent; considering everything, she seems to have deluded herself into believing a fiction because it let her feel good about liberating Derrick from his shortcomings." The article goes on to say that, "Following two years behind bars, Anna won an appeal due to the fact that the trial judge hadn't allowed her to bring up anything related to facilitated communication. Nonetheless, as expert Howard Shane persuasively contends, that treatment remains questionable at best, and deceptive at worst ... it's a method in which the caregiver's subconscious projections lead to misinterpretations and manipulations. That's perhaps the nicest way of saying that Tell Them You Love Me thinks facilitated communication reveals more about the facilitator than the patient."

The Standard praised the documentary for its measured approach in presenting a complex story, commending its balanced narrative and thorough exploration of the scientific context. However, the review criticized the documentary for insufficient attention to the legal intricacies of the trial and the absence of input from a legal expert. Additionally, it noted that the issue of race was not explored in sufficient depth, suggesting that an interviewer could have facilitated a more in-depth discussion on the topic.

The Association for Science in Autism Treatment (ASAT) criticized the film for neglecting to showcase what effective, evidence-based communication interventions should look like; they noted a "diminished attention to evidence-based interventions" throughout the documentary. This omission, according to ASAT, leaves viewers without a clear, comparative framework to distinguish scientifically validated communication methods from debunked approaches like facilitated communication. Consequently, while the film spotlights ethically charged issues surrounding facilitated communication, ASAT argues that it falls short in providing a balanced view of legitimate treatment options that can support individuals with autism and other disabilities who struggle with communication.

== See also ==
- Annie's Coming Out – based on the case of Anne McDonald
- Autism Is a World
- Deej
- Wretches & Jabberers
