= Anar (album) =

Studio album by Markéta Irglová
- Released: 11 October 2011
- Studios: Tarquin Studios, Bridgeport, Connecticut
- Genre: Indie folk
- Length: 49:17
- Language: English
- Label: Anti-
- Producers: Markéta Irglová; Tim Iseler

Markéta Irglová chronology
| Anar (2011) | Muna (2014) |

Anar is the debut solo album by Czech songwriter, musician, actress, and singer Markéta Irglová. It was released in United States on 11 October 2011 on the Anti- record label. The title of the album is from the Persian word انار (anâr), meaning "pomegranate". The album also contains a traditional Persian song, "Dokhtar Ghoochani".

Professional ratings
Review scores
| Source | Rating |
|---|---|
| AllMusic | 2.5/5 stars |

== Track listing ==
All tracks are written by Markéta Irglová, except where noted.

| No. | Title | Length |
|---|---|---|
| 1. | "Your Company" (Irglová, Rob Bochnik) | 4:54 |
| 2. | "We Are Good" | 5:10 |
| 3. | "Crossroads" | 5:12 |
| 4. | "Wings of Desire" | 3:47 |
| 5. | "Only in Your Head" | 3:02 |
| 6. | "Divine Timing" | 3:29 |
| 7. | "Go Back" | 3:09 |
| 8. | "Let Me Fall in Love" | 5:33 |
| 9. | "For Old Times' Sake" | 4:44 |
| 10. | "Last Fall" | 2:25 |
| 11. | "Dokhtar Goochani" (Traditional) | 4:01 |
| 12. | "Now You Know" | 3:45 |
