= Knife Skills =

2017 documentary film by Thomas Lennon

- Film poster
- Directed by: Thomas Lennon
- Produced by: Thomas Lennon; Nick August-Perna
- Edited by: Nick August-Perna
- Distributed by: The New Yorker
- Release date: July 29, 2017
- Running time: 40 minutes
- Country: United States
- Language: English

Knife Skills is a 2017 American documentary film directed by Thomas Lennon. It was nominated for the Academy Award for Best Documentary Short Subject at the 90th Academy Awards. It received generally positive reviews from critics.

== Summary ==
The film focuses on people's transition from prison life to the outside world through Edwins Leadership & Restaurant Institute in Cleveland, Ohio. The goal of the institute is to teach former prisoners life skills and to give them focus in order to reduce recidivism rates. The film follows the first class of students through their training and the opening of the restaurant by founder Brandon Chrostowski.
