= Into Me =

Single by Chantal Kreviazuk

Single by Chantal Kreviazuk

from the album Hard Sail
- Released: 2015
- Length: 3:17
- Label: Warner Music Canada
- Songwriters: Chantal Kreviazuk; Thomas Salter

Chantal Kreviazuk singles chronology
"I Will Be" (2014)	"Into Me" (2015)	"All I Got" (2016)

"Into Me" is a song by singer-songwriter Chantal Kreviazuk which was released as a single on October 9, 2015. Into Me was Kreviazuk's first recording through Warner Music Canada. It is included as the third track on her sixth studio album Hard Sail.

== Music video ==
A lyric video for the song was released on December 15, 2015, through Warner Music Canada The official music video for Into Me, which was released on January 18, 2016, features two principal dancers from the National Ballet of Canada, Heather Ogden and her husband, Guillaume Côté, the song is, according to Kreviazuk, "about the art form of relationships and how they are really hard work but if you keep going and you keep trying then this beautiful masterpiece does come out of it".
