= Under These Rocks and Stones =

Studio album by Chantal Kreviazuk
- Released: October 8, 1996
- Recorded: 1996
- Genre: Adult alternative
- Length: 50:40
- Labels: Columbia; CK-67926
- Producers: Peter Asher, Matt Wallace

Chantal Kreviazuk chronology
Under These Rocks and Stones (1996)	Colour Moving and Still (1999)

Singles from Under These Rocks and Stones
- 1. "God Made Me" Released: October 1996; 2. "Believer" Released: January 1997; 3. "Wayne" Released: May 1997; 4. "Surrounded" Released: September 22, 1997; 5. "Hands" Released: 1997

Professional ratings
Review scores
Source	Rating
Allmusic	4/5 stars

Under These Rocks and Stones is the first album by Canadian singer-songwriter Chantal Kreviazuk. It was released on October 8, 1996 (see 1996 in music) in Canada and June 3, 1997 in the United States. Several singles were released in Canada, including "God Made Me", "Believer", "Wayne", "Surrounded" and "Hands". "Surrounded" became the most successful hit of the parent album; it eventually received airplay in the US, in addition to Canada.

== Canada and international track listing ==
1. "God Made Me" (Kreviazuk, Chris Burke-Gaffney) – 3:10
2. "Surrounded" (Kreviazuk) – 5:18
3. "Don't Be Good" (Kreviazuk) – 4:05
4. "Believer" (Kreviazuk) – 3:16
5. "Grace" (Kreviazuk) – 5:50
6. "Wayne" (Kreviazuk) – 4:46
7. "Imaginary Friend" (Kreviazuk) – 4:11
8. "Hands" (Burke-Gaffney) – 4:33
9. "Disagree" (Kreviazuk, Burke-Gaffney) – 3:29
10. "Co-Dependent" (Burke-Gaffney) – 3:46
11. "Green Apples" (Kreviazuk) – 4:26
12. "Boot" (Kreviazuk, Davey Faragher, David Immerglück, Michael Urbano) – 3:50
13. "Actions Without Love" (Kreviazuk) – 3:52

=== Japan bonus tracks ===
14. "Love Is All" (Kreviazuk, Burke-Gaffney) – 2:55
15. "Dealer" (Kreviazuk) – 3:39
16. "Leaving On A Jet Plane" (John Denver) – 4:42 (Included on the 1998 re-release of the album)

== US track listing ==
1. "God Made Me" (Kreviazuk, Chris Burke-Gaffney) – 3:10
2. "Surrounded" (Kreviazuk) – 5:18
3. "Don't Be Good" (Kreviazuk) – 4:05
4. "Believer" (Kreviazuk) – 3:16
5. "Grace" (Kreviazuk) – 5:50
6. "Wayne" (Kreviazuk) – 4:46
7. "Hands" (Burke-Gaffney) – 4:33
8. "Disagree" (Kreviazuk, Burke-Gaffney) – 3:29
9. "Co-Dependent" (Burke-Gaffney) – 3:46
10. "Green Apples" (Kreviazuk) – 4:26
11. "Boot" (Kreviazuk, Davey Faragher, David Immerglück, Michael Urbano) – 3:50
12. "Imaginary Friend" (Kreviazuk) – 4:11

=== Singles ===
- "God Made Me"
- "Believer"
- "Wayne"
- "Surrounded"
- "Hands"

== Personnel ==
- Chantal Kreviazuk – vocals, piano, keyboards
- Peter Asher – percussion
- Chris Burke-Gaffney – guitar
- Davey Faragher – vocals, background vocals
- Stefanie Fife – cello
- David Immerglück – guitar, mandolin, pedal steel
- Al Lay – background vocals
- Rob Lorentz – violin
- Novi Novog – viola
- Ed Stasium – Hammond organ
- Michael Urbano – percussion, drums

== Production ==
- Producers: Peter Asher, Matt Wallace
- Engineers: Greg Reely, Matt Wallace
- Assistant engineers: Tom Banghart, Michael Baumgertner, Doug Michael
- Mixing: Matt Wallace
- Mastering: Dave Collins
- A&R Direction: Mike Roth
- Production coordination: Christina Hiscox, Valerie Pack, Michael Roth
- String arrangements: David Rubenstein
- Art direction: Sean Evans
- Design: Sean Evans
- Photography: Naomi Kaltman

== Charts ==
Album – Billboard (North America)

Year	Chart	Position
1998	Heatseekers	38
