= In the Name of the Grandfather =

- The Simpsons episode
- The promotional image for the episode: Homer and Grampa on a drinking binge in O'Flanagan's Pub in Ireland.
- Episode no.: Season 20; Episode 14
- Directed by: Ralph Sosa
- Written by: Matt Marshall
- Production code: LABF11
- Original air dates: March 17, 2009 (on Sky1); March 22, 2009 (on Fox)

Guest appearances
- Glen Hansard as Street musician; Markéta Irglová as Eastern European woman; Colm Meaney as Tom O'Flanagan; Marcia Wallace as Edna Krabappel

Episode features
- Chalkboard gag: "Four leaf clovers are not mutant freaks"
- Couch gag: The family members participate in a dog show; Bart wins and Homer attacks him.

Episode chronology
← Previous "Gone Maggie Gone"	Next → "Wedding for Disaster"
- The Simpsons season 20

"In the Name of the Grandfather" is the fourteenth episode of the twentieth season of the American animated television series The Simpsons. It first aired on Sky1 on St. Patrick's Day, March 17, 2009 and aired on the Fox network in the United States on March 22, 2009. It was the first episode of the show to premiere in Europe before airing on Fox. In the episode, the Simpsons buy a new hot tub and spend so much time relaxing in it that they neglect Abraham "Grampa" Simpson. Homer decides to make it up to Grampa by helping him do one thing he wants to do. Grampa reminisces about O'Flanagan's pub in Ireland where he once had the best night of his life so the Simpsons travel there. Marge, Bart and Lisa visit various Irish landmarks while Homer and Grampa buy O'Flanagan's during a night of binge drinking and soon discover that pubs are no longer popular in Ireland.

"In the Name of the Grandfather" was directed by Ralph Sosa and was the first episode of the show to be written by Matt Marshall. Marshall pitched the idea in 2007 and the script was ready for a table read later that year, but the Writers Guild of America strike delayed work on the episode. Described by executive producer Al Jean as "an affectionate love letter to Ireland", the episode was inspired by a New York Times article about the effects of Ireland's smoking ban on pubs. Guest stars for the episode include Colm Meaney as Tom O'Flanagan, Glen Hansard as a street musician and Markéta Irglová as an Eastern European woman. The episode contains numerous jokes about Ireland and references to Irish culture including the Giant's Causeway, Blarney Castle, James Joyce, leprechauns, Guinness, Riverdance, U2 and the film Once.

The special broadcast of the episode in Ireland was part of Fox's year-long "Best. 20 Years. Ever." celebration which commemorates the 20th anniversary of the show. To promote the broadcast, Jean, Brooks and voice actor Nancy Cartwright visited Ireland and participated in the Saint Patrick's Day parade in Dublin. Critics in Ireland mostly enjoyed the jokes about the nation but felt that the episode itself was average. The initial broadcast on Sky1 in Ireland was watched by 511,000 viewers, with a 33 share making it the most watched Sky1 broadcast in Ireland ever. In the United Kingdom, an average of 957,000 viewers (with a 4.7 share) watched. The first airing of the episode on Fox in the United States finished with a 3.6 Nielsen rating and was viewed in 6.15 million homes, finishing third in its timeslot.

== Plot ==
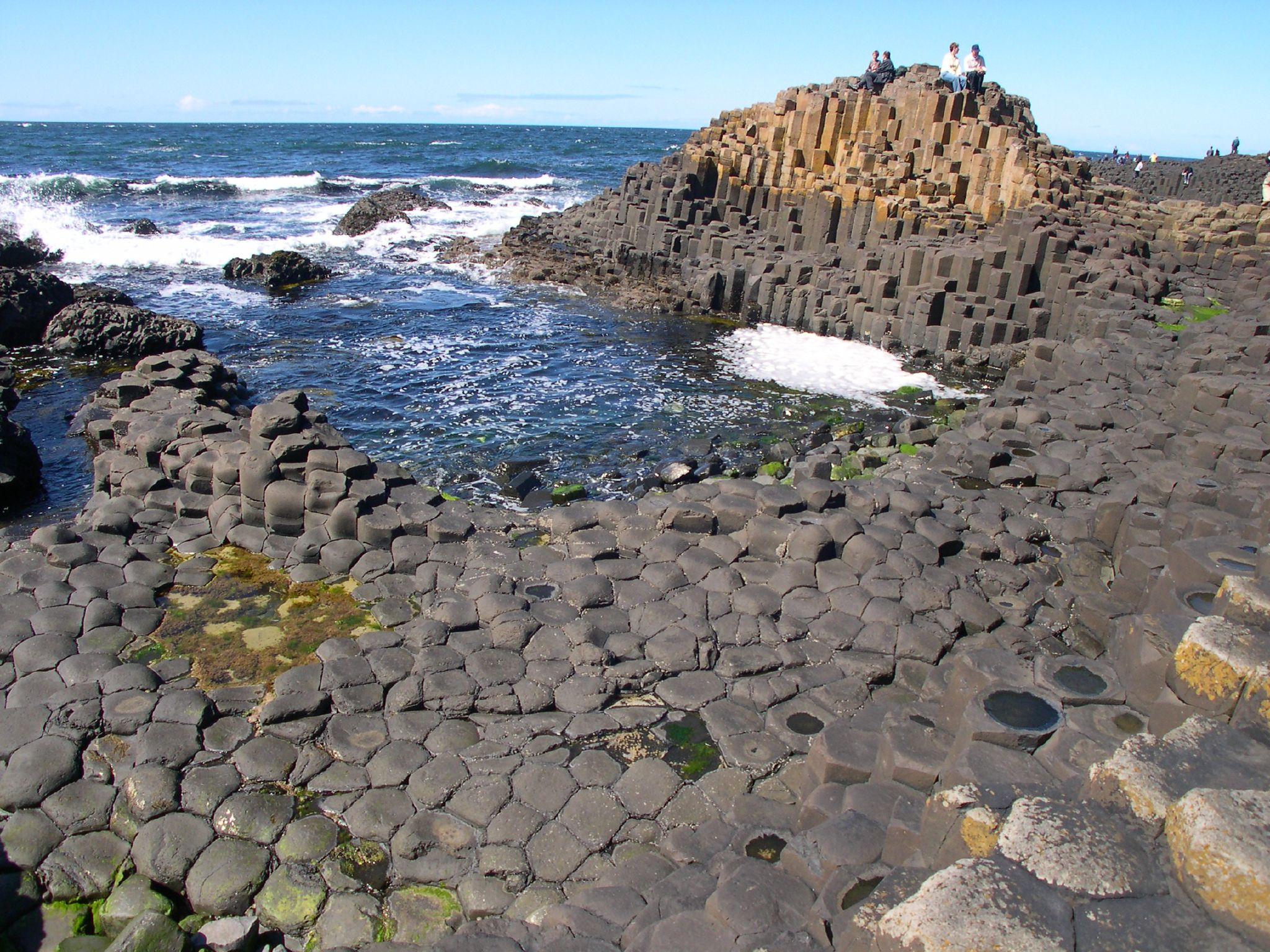
The Giant's Causeway was one of the locations visited in the episode.

The Simpson family visits a home and garden show where they decide to purchase a hot tub. They spend hours soaking in the tub and become so relaxed that they forget to visit Abraham "Grampa" Simpson at a family event. Grampa angrily unplugs and destroys the hot tub, scolding them for ignoring him. Homer and the family decide to make up for their neglect by doing something he's always wanted to do but never got the chance for. Grampa reminisces about a pub in Dunkilderry, Ireland called O'Flanagan's, where he claims to have had the best night of his life many years ago. Homer and the family agree to go to Ireland with Abe so he can have one last drink at the pub. When the family arrives they discover the Celtic Tiger has transformed Ireland into a commercialized, hi-tech country of consumers and workaholics. The pub itself has also run out of business as many of the patrons are now yuppies who have no interest in drinking. The pub owner, a man named Tom O'Flanagan, is happy to have customers again. Homer and Grampa sit down at the pub and start drinking while Marge takes Bart and Lisa to visit various Irish landmarks, such as the Giant's Causeway, Blarney Castle, the Guinness brewery and the city of Dublin.

After a long night of drinking, Homer and Grampa awaken and discover that they bought the pub from Tom O'Flanagan during the previous night's binge, much to their shock and dismay. They rename the bar and try to continue running it but get no business and have to find a way to market their unwelcoming establishment. Homer gets help from Moe Szyslak, who suggests that they allow people to do illegal things in their pub. The guys discover that smoking indoors in Ireland is illegal, so they turn the bar into a smokeasy. They do a roaring trade, but are closed down by the Irish authorities. As punishment, Homer and Grampa are deported back to America and have to pay a small fine. Chief Wiggum arrives to bring them back to the U.S., but accidentally hits himself with his nightstick and then maces and tasers himself.

== Production ==
=== Writing ===
"In the Name of the Grandfather" was the first episode written by Matt Marshall who had previously worked on the show as a writers' assistant. In 2007, he pitched the idea of Grampa Simpson being neglected and the Simpsons taking him to Ireland. The script was ready for a table read in late 2007, but the Writers Guild of America strike delayed work on the episode. Executive producer Al Jean said the episode is intended to be "an affectionate love letter to Ireland" because many of the writers have Irish roots. He added, "The episode is based on the experiences of myself and a lot of the writers on The Simpsons who have Irish ancestry and come back to visit to find it very different, much more hi-tech." According to James L. Brooks, the story was also inspired by a New York Times article about the effects of the smoking ban in Ireland on pubs.

Previous episodes of the show where the Simpsons visit other countries have been controversial. For example, the Simpsons visited Australia in "Bart vs. Australia" (season six, 1995) and Brazil in "Blame It on Lisa" (season 13, 2002) and both episodes generated controversy and negative reaction in the visited countries. In the latter case, Rio de Janeiro's tourist board—who claimed that the city was portrayed as having rampant street crime, kidnappings, slums, and monkey and rat infestations—went so far as to threaten Fox with legal action. When asked whether he thought this episode would generate similar controversies, Al Jean replied "I'm Irish American and I know Irish people have an excellent sense of humor so we weren't very worried."

=== Casting ===
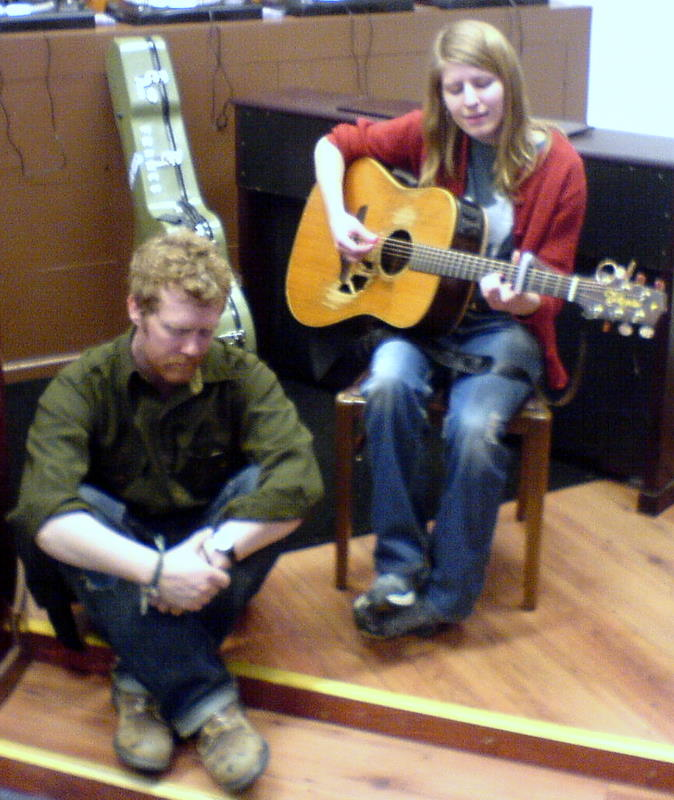
Glen Hansard and Markéta Irglová reprised their roles from Once.

Colm Meaney guest starred as Tom O'Flanagan. Al Jean felt that Meaney was "just perfect with his voice". For the episode, Glen Hansard and Markéta Irglová reprised their roles as a street musician and Eastern European woman, respectively, from the film Once. They recorded their parts in October 2008 in Los Angeles during their tour of the United States.

In a September 2008 interview, Jean said that Kenneth Branagh would guest star as the pub owner and that he had come in to record the part. However, Branagh was replaced by Meaney and did not appear in the episode. According to Fox's official press release, Kathy Ireland was to have a cameo as herself. However, although she appeared in animated form in the episode, a caption stated that the producers asked her to guest voice and that she had declined. The voice of her character was performed by Tress MacNeille.

== Cultural references ==
The episode featured numerous jokes about and references to Ireland and its culture. The title refers to the Irish film In the Name of the Father. The Simpson family visits landmarks including Blarney Castle and Guinness Brewery as well as the Giant's Causeway. The fictional village of Dunkilderry contains yuppie leprechauns described by Grampa as "yuprechauns" and Homer drinks Guinness beer. An advertising executive with Guinness stated that a deal had to be worked out with The Simpsons producers in order for the brand to appear in the episode. The Simpsons visit Dublin on Bloomsday (June 16), a day when people recreate the events in James Joyce's novel Ulysses. Homer says that he wants to take Ireland back to the "good old days of Angela's Ashes", referencing Irish author Frank McCourt's memoir. In his flashback, Grampa dances in Riverdance style. Musicians Glen Hansard and Markéta Irglová reprise their roles as buskers from the 2007 Irish film Once - much of which was originally shot in Mountjoy Square, Dublin, coincidentally a location that is also featured in Ulysses. A billboard in Ireland advertises a U2 moving company with the slogan "We Move in Mysterious Ways".

Apart from the references to Ireland Bart also makes a derogatory remark about Belgium, causing Marge to threaten him with "taking his Tintins away", whereupon Bart clutches a copy of the Tintin book The Crab with the Golden Claws to his chest, promising he'll behave.

== Promotion ==
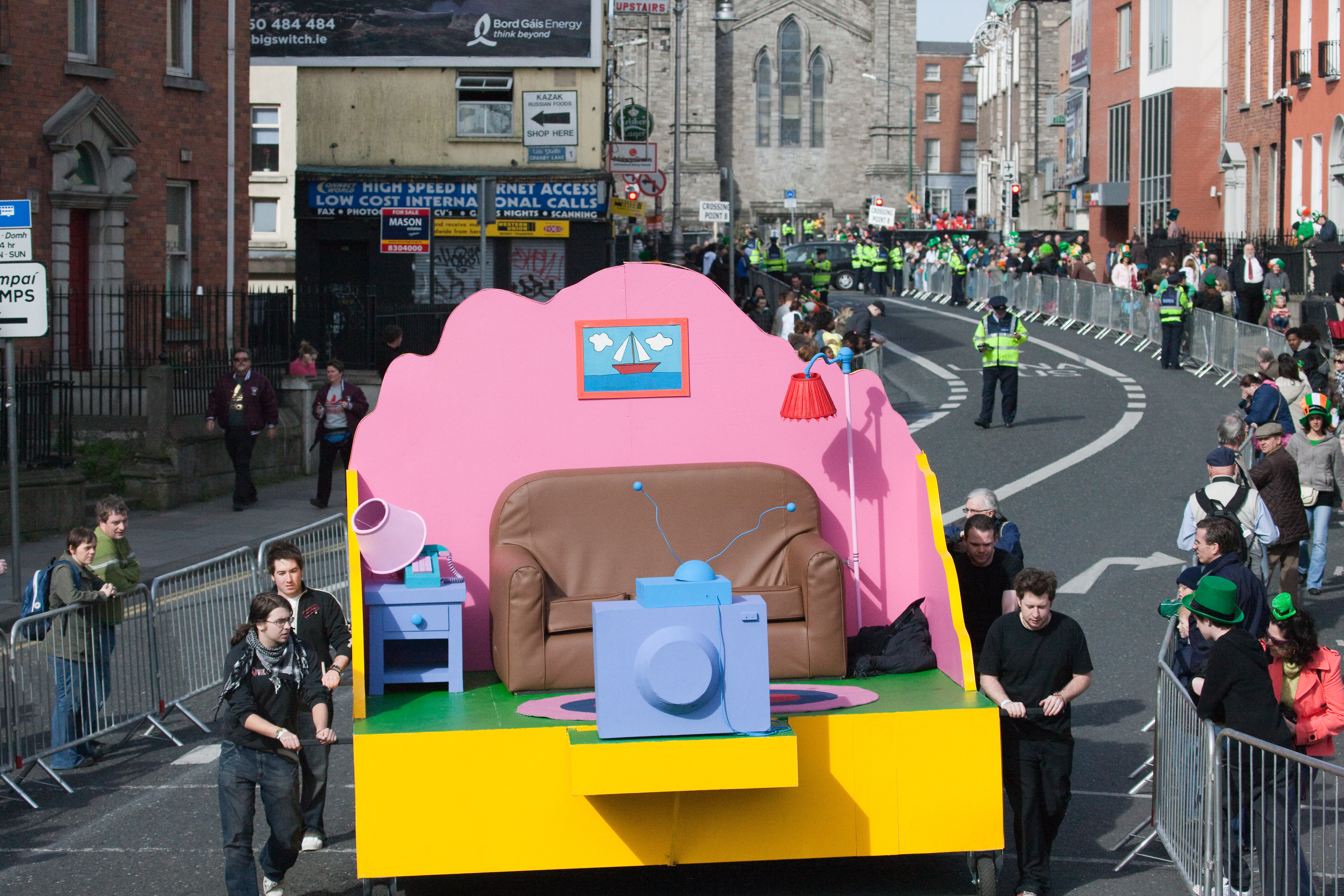
The Simpsons-themed parade float (shown before the start of the parade) that was featured in the 2009 St. Patrick's Day parade in Dublin.

"In the Name of the Grandfather" was first episode of The Simpsons to premiere in Europe before airing on Fox in the United States. Previously, new episodes of the show occasionally aired on the Global Television Network in Canada a half-hour before they aired on Fox. Global simulcasts shows from several American networks and the occasional special forces them to push episodes of The Simpsons to an earlier timeslot.

The episode aired at 7:30 PM on Sky1 and was paired with "Sex, Pies and Idiot Scrapes", the season premiere episode of The Simpsons, which begins with a visit to a St. Patrick's Day parade. The special broadcast is part of Fox's year-long "Best. 20 Years. Ever." celebration which commemorates the 20th anniversary of the show. To promote the broadcast, executive producers Al Jean and James L. Brooks, as well as Nancy Cartwright visited Ireland and participated in the Saint Patrick's Day parade in Dublin. The episode was screened at the Lighthouse Cinema in Dublin on March 16. In addition, Homer was announced as the special guest editor of the March edition of Sky Magazine. To promote the episode in the United States, several people dressed as Marge visited pubs in various major cities on March 17 and gave away codes for free cell phone ringtones and wallpaper. A clip from the episode was played all day on the JumboTron screen in Times Square, New York City.

Before "In the Name of the Grandfather" aired, Irish bookmaker Paddy Power started taking bets on what would happen in the episode. It offered odds on things such as which Irish phrase Homer would use first, number of viewers, and which Irish star would make a cameo appearance.

== Reception ==
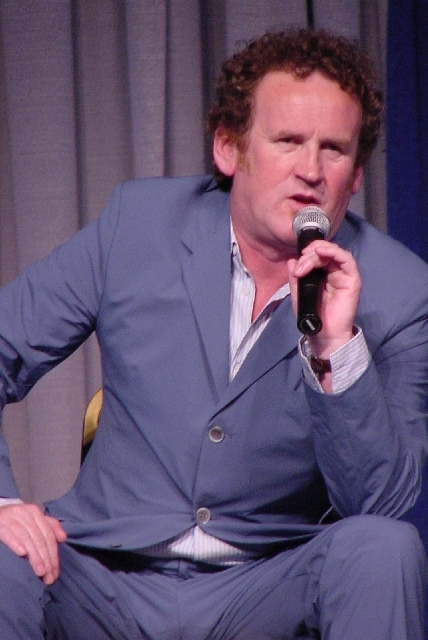
Colm Meaney guest starred as Tom O'Flanagan.

The initial airing of the episode on Sky1 in the United Kingdom drew an average of 957,000 viewers with a 4.7 share of the audience. The initial broadcast on Sky1 in Ireland was watched by 511,000 viewers, with a 33 share. The episode became the most watched Sky1 broadcast in Ireland, breaking the previous record set in April 2004. The episode also had a 60.5 share of child viewers and a 40 share of the 15- to 24-year-old demographic, both records.

The original airing of the episode on Fox in the United States finished with a 3.6 Nielsen rating and was viewed in 6.15 million homes. The episode finished third in its timeslot.

Shane Hegarty of The Irish Times wrote that it "may not have been a vintage episode [...] but it had plenty of good moments, and from an Irish perspective it was a fascinating opportunity to see ourselves through the eyes of the greatest comedy series ever written." He added that "even as it reveled in stereotypes, it used them to continue the running joke about how Ireland doesn't conform to American's [sic] views of it." The change from the booming economy depicted to Ireland's deep recession at time of broadcast "shows how long it takes to make an episode".

Pat Stacey of the Evening Herald gave the episode two stars. He wrote that he enjoyed the jokes about the Irish landmarks but called it "a fairly slapdash, ramshackle half-hour" and mentioned that Colm Meaney deserved a better role.

Evan Fanning of the Sunday Independent wrote "Yes, The Simpsons came to Ireland and all we got was some lousy rehashed jokes and a feeling that the whole thing was a bit of a waste of time."

Robert Canning of IGN wrote "It wasn't the funniest of foreign land adventures, but it was serviceable. [...] The saving grace of the episode was all the Irish-centric vignettes with Marge and the kids. These quick hitting gags were the funniest moments and kept the episode from being completely blah."

Steve Heisler of The A.V. Club gave the episode a B, commenting that the episode "allowed the show to have fun with its surroundings", adding that it was one of his favorites of the twentieth season.
