= Muna (Markéta Irglová album) =

Studio album by Markéta Irglová
- Released: 23 September 2014
- Studios: Greenhouse Studios, IS
- Genres: Chamber folk; gospel
- Length: 51:41
- Language: English
- Labels: Anti-; Epitaph
- Producers: Markéta Irglová; Mio Thorisson

Markéta Irglová chronology
Anar (2011)	Muna (2014)

Singles from Muna
- 1. "The Leading Bird" Released: September 2014; 2. "Fortune Teller" Released: October 2014; 3. "This Right Here" Released: January 2015

Muna is the second solo album by Czech songwriter, musician, actress, and singer Markéta Irglová. It was released on 23 September 2014. The title of the album (pronounced [ˈmʏːna]) is the Icelandic word for "remembering". Marketa said the album is a document of spiritual searching, an album of saints, angels and psalms.

Muna features 27 musicians, utilizing full choral, string and percussion pieces, plus guests Rob Bochnik (The Frames), Iranian daf player and vocalist Aida Shahghasemi, as well as Marketa's sister Zuzi on backing vocals.

Professional ratings
Review scores
Source	Rating
AllMusic	3/5 stars

== Track listing ==
All tracks are written by Markéta Irglová, except where noted.

No.	Title	Length
1.	"Point of Creation"	5:19
2.	"Time Immemorial"	4:28
3.	"The Leading Bird" (Irglová, Aida Shahghasemi)	4:35
4.	"Fortune Teller"	6:09
5.	"Without a Map"	5:26
6.	"Remember Who You Are"	3:26
7.	"Mary"	3:57
8.	"Phoenix"	4:30
9.	"Seasons Change"	3:39
10.	"Gabriel"	4:46
11.	"This Right Here"	5:26
