= Surrounded (Chantal Kreviazuk song) =

1997 single by Chantal Kreviazuk

Single by Chantal Kreviazuk

from the album Under These Rocks and Stones
- B-side: "Love Is All"
- Released: September 22, 1997
- Length: 5:18; 3:58 (radio edit)
- Label: Columbia
- Songwriter: Chantal Kreviazuk
- Producers: Peter Asher; Matt Wallace

Chantal Kreviazuk singles chronology
| "Wayne" (1997) | "Surrounded" (1997) | "Hands" (1998) |

Music video
- "Surrounded" on YouTube

"Surrounded" is a song by Canadian singer-songwriter Chantal Kreviazuk. It was released as the fourth single from Kreviazuk's debut studio album, Under These Rocks and Stones, in Canada on September 22, 1997, and peaked at number nine on the country's singles chart. It was Kreviazuk's first song to chart in the United States, where it was released in December the same year. The single achieved Platinum status in Canada for shipping over 100,000 units.

== Composition ==
Kreviazuk revealed that the song was about the suicide of a former partner when she was 18 years old. She states, as of 2011, that she still has difficulties performing the song live.

== Track listings ==
European CD single

1. "Surrounded" – 5:18
2. "Love Is All" – 2:56

European maxi-CD single

1. "Surrounded" (radio edit) – 3:58
2. "Love Is All" – 2:56
3. "Surrounded" (acoustic) – 5:10

== Charts ==
=== Weekly charts ===
| Chart (1997–1998) | Peak position |
|---|---|
| Canada Top Singles (RPM) | 9 |
| Canada Adult Contemporary (RPM) | 9 |
| Canada Rock/Alternative (RPM) | 14 |
| US Radio Songs (Billboard) | 74 |
| US Adult Alternative Airplay (Billboard) | 17 |
| US Adult Pop Airplay (Billboard) | 19 |

=== Year-end charts ===
| Chart (1998) | Position |
|---|---|
| Canada Top Singles (RPM) | 71 |
| Canada Adult Contemporary (RPM) | 47 |
| US Adult Top 40 (Billboard) | 60 |

== Certifications ==
| Region | Certification | Certified units/sales |
|---|---|---|
| Canada (Music Canada) | Platinum | 100,000^{^} |
^{^} Shipments figures based on certification alone.

== Release history ==
| Region | Date | Label(s) | Ref. |
|---|---|---|---|
| Canada | September 22, 1997 | Columbia | |
| United States | December 1997 | Columbia | |
