= Before You =

1999 single by Chantal Kreviazuk

Single by Chantal Kreviazuk

from the album Colour Moving and Still
- Released: 7 September 1999
- Length: 3:52
- Label: Sony Canada; Columbia
- Songwriters: Jay Joyce; Chantal Kreviazuk
- Producer: Jay Joyce

Chantal Kreviazuk singles chronology
| "Feels Like Home" (1999) | "Before You" (1999) | "Dear Life" (2000) |

Music video
- "Before You" on YouTube

"Before You" is a song by Canadian singer-songwriter Chantal Kreviazuk. It was released as the lead single from Kreviazuk's second studio album, Colour Moving and Still, on 7 September 1999. The song peaked at number two on the Canadian RPM 100 Hit Tracks chart, becoming Kreviazuk's biggest hit in Canada. Kreviazuk performed the song live at the 2000 Juno Awards.

== Background ==
Kreviazuk wrote the song several days before the recording of Colour Moving and Still. She explained, "We were in our third day of preproduction, and I was so bummed ... I wrote the song during that low point. It showed me that a creative low can bring something great out of you."

== Charts ==
=== Weekly charts ===
| Chart (1999–2000) | Peak position |
|---|---|
| Canada Top Singles (RPM) | 2 |
| Canada Adult Contemporary (RPM) | 4 |
| Canada CHR (Nielsen BDS) | 8 |

=== Year-end charts ===
| Chart (1999) | Position |
|---|---|
| Canada Top Singles (RPM) | 71 |
| Canada Adult Contemporary (RPM) | 84 |

== Release history ==
| Region | Date | Format(s) | Label(s) | Ref(s). |
|---|---|---|---|---|
| Canada | 7 September 1999 | Radio | Sony Canada | |
| United States | 14 February 2000 | Triple A radio | Columbia | |
| United States | 3 April 2000 | Hot adult contemporary; modern adult contemporary radio | Columbia | |
| United States | 4 April 2000 | Contemporary hit radio | Columbia | |
| United States (re-release) | 5 March 2001 | Adult contemporary; hot adult contemporary radio | Columbia | |
