= The Swell Season (film) =

2011 American documentary film

- Film poster
- Directed by: Nick August-Perna; Chris Dapkins; Carlo Mirabella-Davis
- Produced by: Carlo Mirabella-Davis
- Starring: Glen Hansard; Markéta Irglová
- Cinematography: Chris Dapkins
- Edited by: Nick August-Perna
- Music by: Glen Hansard; Markéta Irglová
- Release date: 22 April 2011
- Running time: 91 minutes
- Country: United States
- Language: English

The Swell Season is a 2011 American documentary film directed by Nick August-Perna, Chris Dapkins, and Carlo Mirabella-Davis.

== Synopsis ==
After the success of the Irish movie Once and an Academy Award win, duo Glen Hansard and Markéta Irglová became known around the world. While Hansard has already been touring for many years, this experience is new to Irglová. She does not feel like a prominent person and is uncomfortable with the media attention. These circumstances and dynamics put a strain on their personal relationship.

== Background ==
When the band the Swell Season went on tour, after the success of the movie Once, Hansard asked his film teacher Carlo Mirabella-Davis to document the tour. The documentary was filmed between 2007 and 2010 by Mirabella-Davis and his co-directors Chris Dapkins and Nick August-Perna. The film was shot in black and white and shows the protagonists on their tour and at home. It was cut from over 200 hours of film footage. Originally, the documentary should have become a classic music documentary. That changed, however, when the directors shot at Hansard's parents house. The film now became more of a documentary documenting the "burden of dreams and the gradual dissolution or transformation of a romantic relationship". During the shooting, Hansard and Irglova's relationship ended.

== Reception ==
=== Box office ===
The Swell Season was first shown in 2011 at the Tribeca Film Festival. It was released in America on DVD in 2012 and in Britain in 2014. It was also released in Germany, Spain, Austria (StudioCanal), Switzerland, Australia (Icon), Korea (Jin Jin), and Canada (Mongrel).

=== Critical response ===
Kevin Huber of Filmstarts wrote that the film is interesting and worth watching for viewers who know the movie Once, but would be more suitable as bonus material for that film's DVD rather than a standalone documentary. Lisa Kennedy of The Denver Post observed that the film "moves even as it chastises".

The Stanford Daily described the film as a "painfully honest love story set in an extraordinary musical context". Brian Tucker from Star News Online wrote that it is one of the better documentaries because it is open and honest, it shows the love and the pressure to succeed after years of work. Carsten Knox of The Coast commented that the film is indispensable for fans of the music, as well as offering an amazingly intimate insight into the consequences of unexpected celebrity. Sasha Stone of Awards Daily characterised The Swell Season as an outstanding film that deserves an Oscar nomination.
