= Markéta Irglová =

Czech and Icelandic musician and actress (born 1988)

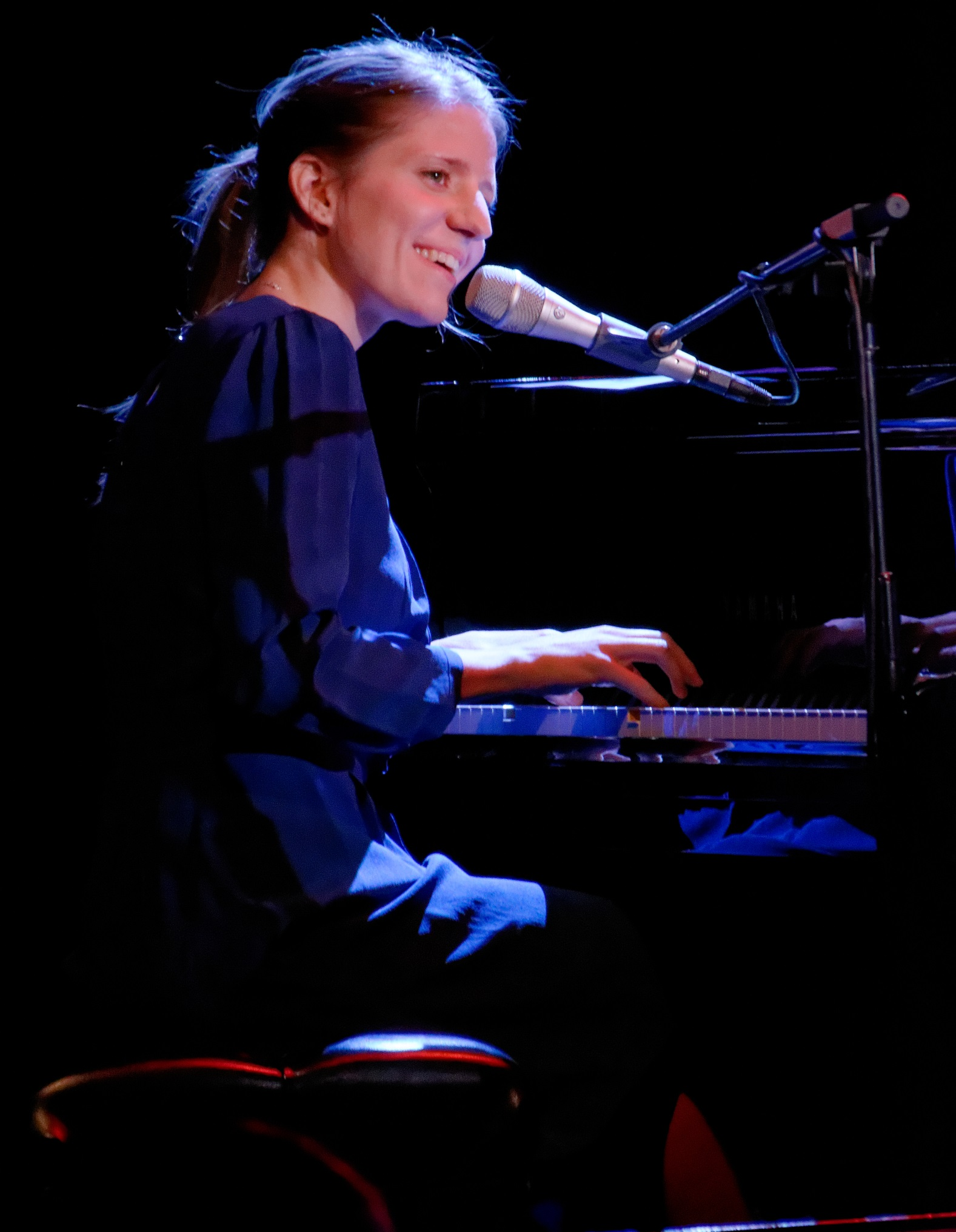
- Irglová performing in 2014
- Born: 28 February 1988 (age 38); Valašské Meziříčí, Czechoslovakia
- Citizenship: Czech Republic; Iceland
- Spouses: Tim Iseler (m. 2011; div. 2012) Sturla Míó Þórisson (m. 2019)
- Partner: Glen Hansard (2006–2009)
- Children: 3
- Musical career
- Genres: Folk rock; folk; indie pop; acoustic rock
- Occupations: Singer-songwriter; actress
- Instruments: Vocals; piano; guitar; mandolin
- Years active: 2006–present
- Label: ANTI-
- Member of: The Swell Season
- Website: marketairglovamusic.com

Markéta Irglová (Czech pronunciation: [ˈmarkɛːta ˈɪrɡlovaː]) (born 28 February 1988) is a Czech and Icelandic singer-songwriter, musician, and actress. She starred in the 2007 film Once, which earned her a number of major awards, including the Academy Award for Best Original Song for "Falling Slowly", with co-writer and co-star Glen Hansard. In 2005, she and Hansard formed the duo the Swell Season, which released three studio albums. She has also published four solo records.

== Career ==
=== The Swell Season ===
In 2005, Irglová and Glen Hansard formed the Swell Season. They released their eponymous debut album on Overcoat Recordings in 2006. In 2007, they co-starred in the indie film Once, for which they also composed the soundtrack. One of the songs, "Falling Slowly", received an Academy Award for Best Original Song, making Irglová the first Czech person to win that award and the youngest Oscar winner in a non-acting category.

The Swell Season released their second album, Strict Joy, in 2009, and two years later, they went on an extended hiatus. In 2011, a stage adaptation of Once was created by John Carney and Enda Walsh, incorporating Irglová and Hansard's songs. It went on to win eight Tony Awards and the Grammy Award for Best Musical Theater Album.

In 2022, the Swell Season reformed, and a year later, they embarked on their first world tour since 2011. In 2025, they issued their third studio album, Forward. In July 2026, Hansard died in a motorcycle crash, aged 56.

=== Solo work ===
In 2011, Irglová released her debut solo album, Anar. She followed it with Muna in 2014. In 2022, she issued Lila. That year, she was announced as one of the participants in Söngvakeppnin 2022, the Icelandic national final for the Eurovision Song Contest, where she competed with the song "Mögulegt" / "Possible".

In 2023, she was announced as one of five participants in Eurovision Song CZ 2023, Czechia's national final for the Eurovision Song Contest. She came in fourth place, with 1,009 points.

In 2024, she released the EP Where You Belong.

== Personal life ==
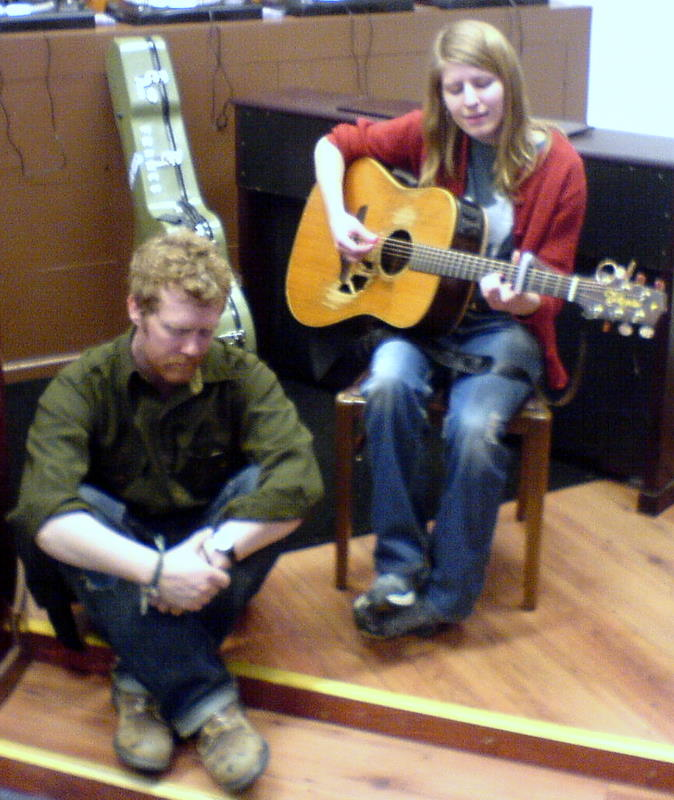
Irglová with Hansard performing in Derry, Northern Ireland, in 2006

Irglová began taking piano lessons at age seven and started playing guitar when she was eight. Her parents organised a music festival in Czechia and hired the Frames, Glen Hansard's band, where she first met him, in 2001, at the age of 13. Hansard played a large part not only in her development as an artist and songwriter but also in launching her career. They began a romantic relationship during the filming of Once and separated in 2009. The aftermath of both Once and their relationship is the subject of the 2011 documentary film The Swell Season.

Irglová was married to Tim Iseler from 2011 to 2012.

In 2012, she moved to Reykjavík, Iceland, where she met music producer Sturla Míó Þórisson while recording Anar. They married in 2019 and have three children together. Irglová speaks fluent Icelandic and is a dual citizen of Czechia and Iceland.

== Discography ==
=== with the Swell Season ===
- The Swell Season (2006)
- Once (soundtrack) (2007)
- Strict Joy (2009)
- Forward (2025)

=== Solo ===
- Anar (2011)
- Muna (2014)
- Home Is Here film soundtrack, with Sturla Míó Þórisson (2016)
- Lila (2022)
- Where You Belong (EP, 2024)

== Filmography ==
Film

- Once (2007)
- The Swell Season (2011)

Television

- Live from the Artists Den: The Swell Season (season 1, episode 8, 2008)
- The Simpsons episode "In the Name of the Grandfather" (2009)

== Awards and nominations ==
Year	Award	Category	Nominated work	Result	Ref.
2007	Academy Awards	Best Original Song	"Falling Slowly" (from Once)	Won	
2007	Central Ohio Film Critics Association Awards	Best Score	Once	Won	
2007	Chicago Film Critics Association Awards	Best Original Score	Once	Won	
2007	Critics' Choice Movie Awards	Best Song	"Falling Slowly" (from Once)	Won	
2012	Drama Desk Awards	Outstanding Lyrics	Once	Won	
2012	Drama Desk Awards	Outstanding Music	Once	Nominated	
2007	Evening Standard British Film Awards	Best Film Score	Once	Nominated	
2007	Florida Film Critics Circle Awards	Best Original Songs	Once	Won	
2007	Gold Derby Film Awards	Original Song	"Falling Slowly" (from Once)	Won	
2007	Grammy Awards	Best Compilation Soundtrack for Visual Media	Once	Nominated	
2007	Grammy Awards	Best Song Written for a Motion Picture, Television or Other Visual Media	"Falling Slowly" (from Once)	Nominated	
2009	Houston Film Critics Society	Best Original Score	Once	Nominated	
2009	Houston Film Critics Society	Best Original Song	"Falling Slowly" (from Once)	Won	
2009	Houston Film Critics Society	Best Original Song	"If You Want Me" (from Once)	Nominated	
2014	Laurence Olivier Awards	Outstanding Achievement in Music	Once	Won	
2007	Los Angeles Film Critics Association Awards	Best Music Score	Once	Won	
2007	Online Film & Television Association Awards	Best Original Song	"Falling Slowly" (from Once)	Won	
2007	Online Film Critics Society	Best Original Score	Once	Nominated	
2007	Phoenix Film Critics Society Awards	Best Original Song	"Falling Slowly" (from Once)	Won	
2007	Satellite Awards	Best Original Song	"If You Want Me" (from Once)	Nominated	
2007	St. Louis Film Critics Association Awards	Best Score	Once	Nominated	
2007	World Soundtrack Awards	Best Original Song Written for a Film	"Falling Slowly" (from Once)	Nominated	
