= Chantal Kreviazuk =

Canadian singer-songwriter (born 1973)

Chantal Kreviazuk CM OM
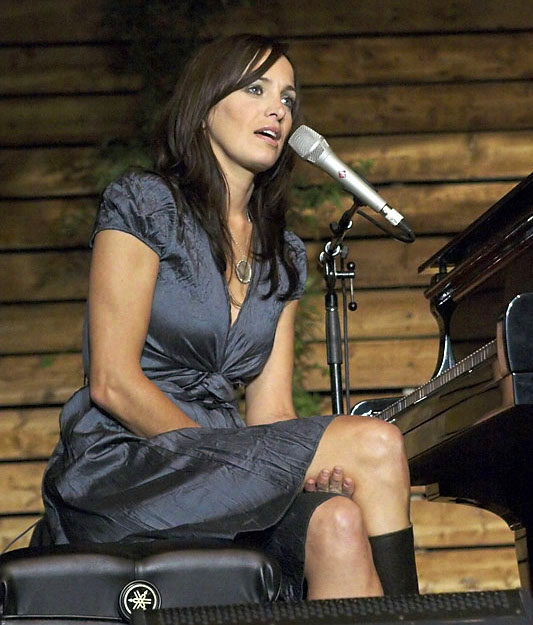
- Chantal Kreviazuk during a September 2007 performance at Jackson-Triggs Winery (Niagara-on-the-Lake, Ontario, Canada)

Background information
- Born: Chantal Jennifer Kreviazuk; May 18, 1973 (age 53); Winnipeg, Manitoba, Canada
- Genres: Pop, pop rock, adult contemporary
- Occupations: Musician, singer, songwriter, vocalist
- Instruments: Piano, guitar, vocals
- Years active: 1996–present
- Labels: Columbia, Sony BMG, MapleMusic, Warner Music Canada
- Spouse: Raine Maida (m. 1999)
- Website: www.chantalkreviazuk.com www.raineandchantal.com

Chantal Jennifer Kreviazuk (/ʃɑːnˈtɑːl ˌkrɛviˈæzək/ shahn-TAHL KREV-ee-AZ-ək; born May 18, 1973) is a Canadian singer, songwriter, composer, and pianist.

Born in Winnipeg, Kreviazuk played music from a young age before signing with Columbia Records and releasing her debut album Under These Rocks and Stones (1996).

Kreviazuk released two more studio albums with the Columbia label, Colour Moving and Still (1999) and What If It All Means Something (2002), both of which brought moderate commercial success worldwide. She signed with Sony BMG for her fourth album, Ghost Stories (2006), which reached number two on the Canadian Albums Chart.

Since 2003, Kreviazuk has co-written and composed numerous songs for other artists as well as film soundtracks, and has appeared in several Canadian independent and short films. Her fifth album, Plain Jane, was released by Canadian independent label MapleMusic Recordings in 2009. Her most recent albums, Hard Sail and Get To You, were released by Warner Music Canada in 2016 and 2020, respectively. She also released a Christmas album in 2019, called Christmas Is A Way Of Life, My Dear.

From the beginning of her career to 2016, Kreviazuk was the 51st best-selling Canadian artist in Canada.

Kreviazuk is a three-time Juno Award winner and she has collaborated with several other musicians, including Kelly Clarkson, Drake, Pitbull, Christina Aguilera, Carrie Underwood, Kendrick Lamar and Pink.

== Career ==
=== Albums ===
Kreviazuk's debut album, Under These Rocks and Stones, was first issued in Canada in October 1996 before being released in the US June 1997 to critical praise. The album sold over 150,000 copies in Canada according to SoundScan, fueled mostly by the singles "Surrounded" and "God Made Me". Three videos from the album received modest play on the video channel MuchMusic and radio ("God Made Me", "Believer" and "Wayne"), but it was a fourth, "Surrounded", that became her first major Canadian airplay hit in 1997. That year, Kreviazuk received her first Juno Award nomination as Best New Artist. She also took part in the 1998 Lilith Fair music festival; "Surrounded" was included in the live compilation album from that year.

In 1999, Kreviazuk released her second album. Titled Colour Moving and Still, it featured tracks written with her new husband, Raine Maida, lead singer of Our Lady Peace. The lead single from the album "Before You" became a huge radio hit in Canada and she performed the single on the 2000 Juno Awards, where she won two awards for Best Adult/Pop Album and Best Female Artist. Kreviazuk released two more videos from the album, "Dear Life" and "Far Away", as well as an additional radio release, "Souls", which was also remixed and was released as a promo vinyl for the M1 & Steve Fernandez Remix.

Her third album, What If It All Means Something, was released in 2002. This album also featured multiple collaborations with Maida. The first single, "In This Life", was a hit in Canada. Kreviazuk performed the song live on The Tonight Show with Jay Leno.

Kreviazuk began writing and recording her fourth album in her home studio in August, 2005, with Maida producing. The first single off the album, "All I Can Do", was made available on her official website and MySpace page prior to the release of the album. On July 24 the album premiered on the Canadian music channel Much More Music along with a behind the scenes special. The album, Ghost Stories, was released August 29, 2006.

On October 28, 2008, she released her first compilation album, Since We Met: The Best of 1996-2006.

On October 13, 2009, she released her fifth studio album, Plain Jane.

Kreviazuk was featured on the song Over My Dead Body by fellow Canadian artist Drake from his 2011 album Take Care, which won a Grammy award.

Her first live album, entitled In This Life, was released on July 3, 2012.

She featured on rapper Jay Rock's track Pay for It, which she performed alongside Jay Rock and Kendrick Lamar on Saturday Night Live on November 15, 2014.

In November 2014, Kreviazuk released a new single called "I Will Be", speaking to her desire to want to help those who feel alone and isolated. She sang the song live on December 12 on the Toronto radio station 104.5 CHUM FM.

=== Soundtracks ===
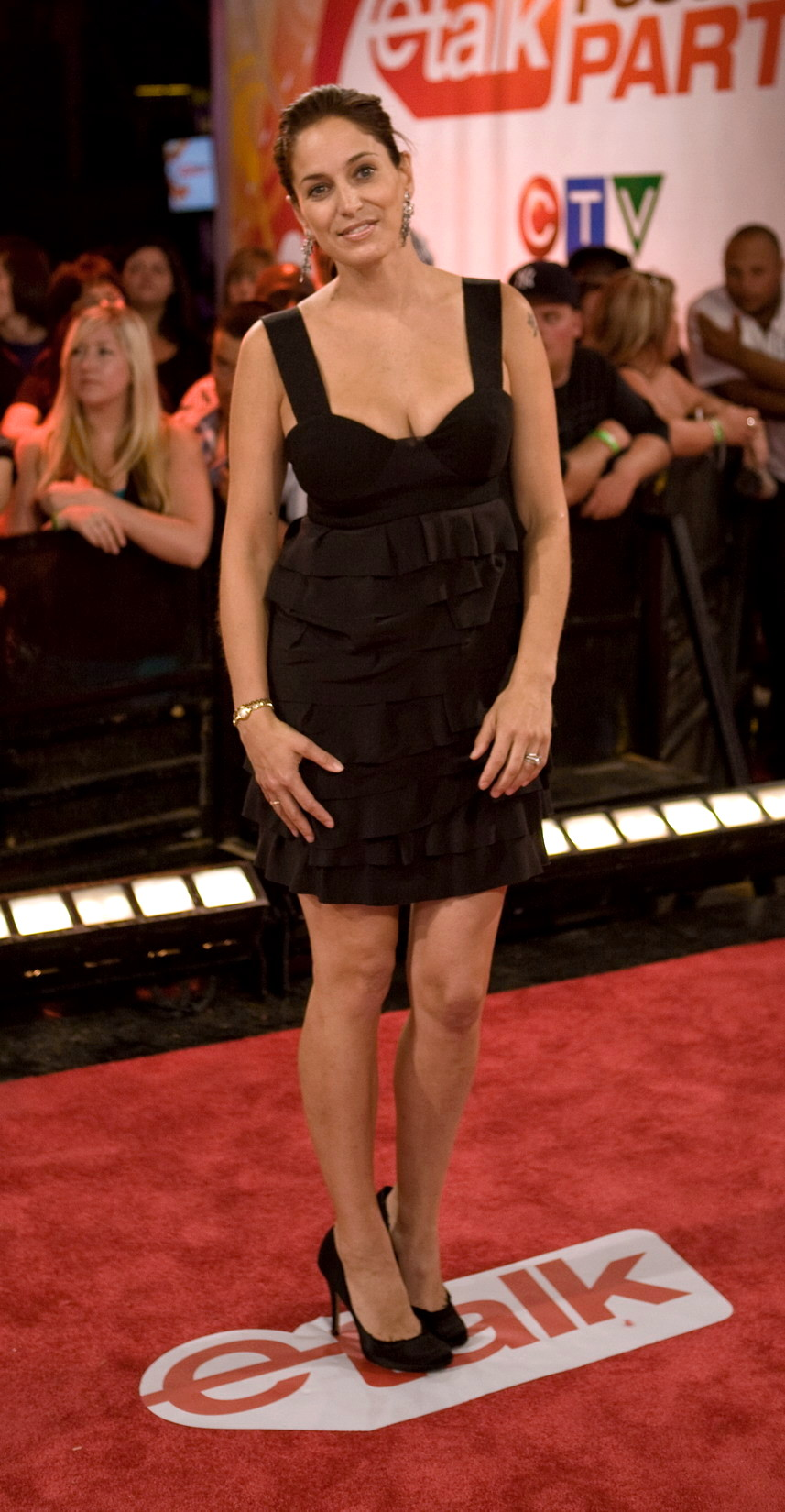
Chantal Kreviazuk at the etalk Festival Party, 2008

Kreviazuk's work has appeared on many soundtracks for films and television shows. In 1998, Kreviazuk scored her only international hit to date with a cover of "Leaving on a Jet Plane", a song written by John Denver and popularized by Peter, Paul and Mary. The song appeared on the soundtrack to the blockbuster film Armageddon and was that album's follow-up single to Aerosmith's "I Don't Want to Miss a Thing". The song "Leaving on a Jet Plane" was also on a trailer for The Terminal, and on TV spots for The Prince and Me and De-Lovely.

In 1999, Kreviazuk recorded a cover of the Randy Newman ballad "Feels Like Home" for the Dawson's Creek soundtrack, as well as How to Lose a Guy in 10 Days. She also performed a cover version of The Beatles' "In My Life" as the theme song for the NBC television drama series Providence.

In 2002, Kreviazuk recorded "Another Small Adventure" which was played in Stuart Little 2 and was also on the soundtrack.

"In this Life" was featured in the film Saved! and also in a trailer for the film The Door in the Floor starring Jeff Bridges, as well as in an episode of the CW Television Network's Smallville and Everwood. Kreviazuk's "Time" was played in the credits of the movie Uptown Girls, and featured in an episode of the MTV reality show, Laguna Beach: The Real Orange County, the pilot episode of the ABC romantic comedy/drama Men in Trees, the CBS drama Joan of Arcadia, and the ABC family movie Lucky 7. Her song "This Year" was featured on the Serendipity soundtrack. In 2005, two new songs written and performed by Kreviazuk were also featured on the soundtrack of the movie The Sisterhood of the Traveling Pants. In 2006, "It's All About a Kiss" played during the film Just My Luck. The song "Weight of the World" is also featured during the credits of the 2003 film How to Lose a Guy in 10 Days and in the US television series Wildfire.

=== Songwriting for other artists ===
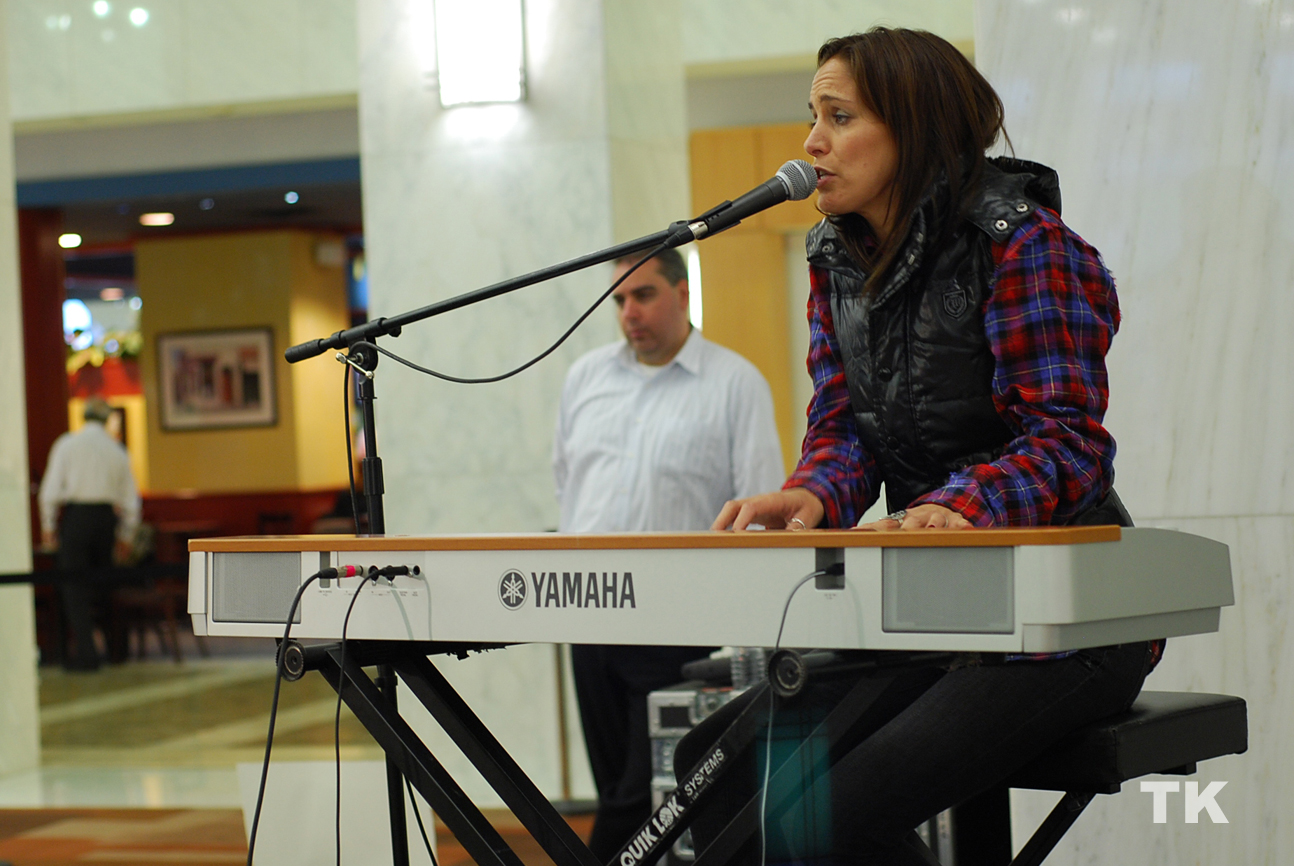
Kreviazuk performing at Busking for Change 2009

Since 2003, Kreviazuk has co-written many songs for other artists, often collaborating with her husband Raine Maida. In 2003, Kreviazuk and Maida collaborated on a number of tracks with Avril Lavigne for Lavigne's second album Under My Skin. Kreviazuk and Maida also contributed songs to Kelly Clarkson's 2004 album Breakaway, The Veronicas' The Secret Life of the Veronicas, Marion Raven's 2005 and 2007 albums Here I Am and Set Me Free, Cheyenne Kimball's debut Hanging On in 2006, and the song "Permanent" from David Cook's self-titled album. She also helped write a song called "Gardenia" which appears on Mandy Moore's 2007 album Wild Hope. In 2011, she appeared on the rapper Drake's album Take Care; she wrote part of the song "Over My Dead Body" and sang the chorus. In 2012 Chantal wrote the Pitbull ft. Christina Aguilera single "Feel This Moment" with The Messengers. She also wrote Josh Groban's single "Brave" with Groban and Thomas "Tawgs" Salter. In 2014 she wrote the song "You Don't Care About Me" with Shakira, released on her self-titled album. She also worked with Jennifer Lopez on her album A.K.A. and the song "Emotions". Kreviazuk was also one of the writers of "If I'm Dancing" on the Britney Spears album Glory.

=== Other work ===
In 2001, Kreviazuk made her big-screen debut as a main character in David Weaver's indie film Century Hotel (co-starring alongside Sandrine Holt and Mia Kirshner). She also co-wrote the movie's theme song, "Can't Make it Good", with Maida. In 2007, Kreviazuk starred in Pretty Broken, a short film about a woman dealing with mental illness. Kreviazuk also co-produced the movie.

Kreviazuk has contributed vocals to various releases by other artists. She sang background vocals on a Nightmare of You song called "I Want to Be Buried in Your Backyard", which was released on their 2005 self-titled debut album. She has also contributed to Maida's solo EP, Love Hope Hero. Kreviazuk also provided additional vocals on a Men, Women & Children song titled "Monkey Monkee Men", from their 2006 self-titled debut album. She performed vocals for Chris Botti on the song "The Look of Love". Kreviazuk also appears on Canadian singer-songwriter Ryan MacGrath's 2010 record, "Cooper Hatch Paris". She performed a duet with the artist entitled "Bird & Cage".

Kreviazuk formerly maintained a MySpace page where she posted about her daily life, her thoughts on world politics, and updated fans on her music.

On March 27, 2010, Kreviazuk headlined a concert held at Yonge-Dundas Square (now Sankofa Square) in Toronto to celebrate WWF's Earth Hour. In 2010, she contributed the song "Na Miso" to the Enough Project and Downtown Records' Raise Hope for Congo compilation with Bibiana Mpoyo. Proceeds from the compilation fund efforts to make the protection and empowerment of Congo's women a priority, as well as inspire individuals around the world to raise their voice for peace in Congo.

On March 29, 2014, Kreviazuk and her husband Raine Maida received the Alan Waters Humanitarian Award at the Juno Gala Dinner & Awards during the 2014 Juno Awards in Winnipeg, Manitoba. The Allan Waters Humanitarian Award recognizes outstanding Canadian artists whose contributions have positively enhanced the social fabric of Canada.

In December 2014, Kreviazuk was appointed a member of the Order of Canada along with her husband Raine Maida by Governor General David Johnston for their charitable and humanitarian work.

In February 2025, Kreviazuk sang the national anthem O Canada at the final game of the 4 Nations Face-Off hockey series in Boston, during which she changed the lyric "in all of us command" to "that only us command." The lyric change was an intentional publicity stunt in response to the annexationist rhetoric against Canada from US President Donald Trump.

In 2026, she was appointed to the Order of Manitoba, the province’s highest honour.

== Personal life ==
Kreviazuk was born in Winnipeg, Manitoba, and attended Balmoral Hall School for Girls. She graduated from the University of Winnipeg Collegiate, and has subsequently received an Honorary Doctorate from the University of Winnipeg for her philanthropic work for War Child. She has two brothers, Michael and Trevor and is also the second cousin of curler and 2013 Scotties Tournament of Hearts champion Alison Kreviazuk. She is of Ukrainian and Métis descent.

Kreviazuk met Raine Maida, the lead singer of Our Lady Peace, at a Pearl Jam concert in Toronto in 1996. They married in December 1999, and have three sons, born January 2004, June 2005, and June 2008. In honour of their tenth wedding anniversary, Kreviazuk and Maida renewed their wedding vows in Costa Rica in November 2009. The family lives in Toronto and also has a home in the USA.

Kreviazuk and Maida appeared in the 2019 documentary film I'm Going to Break Your Heart, which detailed both their collaboration on the album Moon vs. Sun, their first album recorded jointly as a duo, and the conflicts and tensions that had arisen in their marriage after 19 years.

Kreviazuk is a member of the Canadian charity Artists Against Racism. She has been intimately involved with War Child and other charities since 2003.

== Discography ==
=== Studio albums ===
Year	Album	Chart positions				Certifications
Year	Album	CAN	US 200	US Ind.	US Heat	Certifications
1996	Under These Rocks and Stones: Released: October 8, 1996; Label: Columbia Records	33	—	—	38	MC: 2× Platinum
1999	Colour Moving and Still: Released: October 5, 1999; Label: Columbia Records	5	—	—	—	MC: 2× Platinum
2002	What If It All Means Something: Released: December 24, 2002; Label: Columbia Records	—	119	21	2	MC: Gold
2006	Ghost Stories: Released: August 29, 2006; Label: Sony BMG	2	—	41	17	MC: Gold
2009	Plain Jane: Released: October 13, 2009; Label: MapleMusic Recordings	16	—	—	—	
2016	Hard Sail: Released: June 17, 2016; Label: Warner Music Canada	65	—	—	—	
2020	Get to You: Released: June 5, 2020; Label: Warner Music Canada	—	—	—	—	
2026	Rockstar Joy: Released: October 9, 2026; Label: Wax Records	—	—	—	—	

=== Christmas albums ===
Year	Album
2026	In My Own Voice: Released: May 22, 2026; Label: Wax Records; Format: CD

=== Christmas albums ===
Year	Album
2019	Christmas Is A Way Of Life, My Dear: Released: November 15, 2019; Label: Warner Music Canada; Format: CD

=== Live albums ===
Year	Album	Notes
2011	In This Life: Label: MapleMusic Recordings; Format: CD & DVD	Rereleased in 2012 as digital download from Pheromone Records

=== Singles ===
Year	Title	Chart Positions			Album
Year	Title	CAN	CAN AC	US Adult	Album
1996	"God Made Me"	9	—	—	Under These Rocks and Stones
1997	"Believer"	31	—	—	Under These Rocks and Stones
1997	"Wayne"	20	40	—	Under These Rocks and Stones
1997	"Surrounded"	9	9	19	Under These Rocks and Stones
1998	"Hands"	26	—	—	Under These Rocks and Stones
1998	"Leaving on a Jet Plane"	33	—	—	Armageddon (soundtrack)
1999	"Feels Like Home"	—	12	—	Songs from Dawson's Creek
1999	"Before You"	2	4	—	Colour Moving and Still
2000	"Dear Life"	14	—	—	Colour Moving and Still
2000	"Souls"	44	70	—	Colour Moving and Still
2001	"Far Away"	49	—	—	Colour Moving and Still
2002	"In This Life"	—	—	17	What If It All Means Something
2003	"Time"	—	—	—	What If It All Means Something
2003	"Julia"	—	—	—	What If It All Means Something
2003	"What If It All Means Something"	—	—	—	What If It All Means Something
2004	"Weight of the World"	—	—	—	What If It All Means Something
2006	"All I Can Do"	66	2	—	Ghost Stories
2007	"Wonderful"	71	6	—	Ghost Stories
2007	"Ghosts of You"	—	—	—	Ghost Stories
2009	"Invincible"	60	5	—	Plain Jane
2010	"The Way"	—	—	—	Plain Jane
2010	"Ordinary People"	—	23	—	Plain Jane
2015	"Into Me"	—	46	—	Hard Sail
2016	"All I Got"	—	—	—	Hard Sail
2016	"Lost"	—	—	—	Hard Sail
2018	"Child of the Water"	—	—	—	Sharkwater Extinction (soundtrack)
2020	"Get to You"	—	—	—	Get to You
2020	"Love Gone Insane"	—	—	—	Get to You
2025	"Over My Dead Body"	—	—	—	In My Own Voice
2025	"Feel This Moment"	—	—	—	In My Own Voice
2026	"All the Walls Came Down"	—	—	—	Non-album single
2026	"Walk Away"	—	—	—	In My Own Voice

=== Music videos ===
Year	Title
1996	"Believer"
1996	"God Made Me"
1997	"God Made Me" (US Version)
1997	"Surrounded"
1997	"Wayne"
1999	"Blue"
1999	"Dear Life"
1999	"In This Life"
1999	"Leaving On a Jet Plane"
2000	"Before You"
2000	"Far Away"
2002	"Time" (featuring clips from Uptown Girls)
2005	"Lebo's River – A Tribute" (with Raine Maida)
2006	"All I Can Do"
2007	"Wonderful"
2009	"Invincible"
2015	"Into Me"
2016	"All I Got"
2017	"Lost"

=== Bonus tracks and other appearances ===
Year	Title	Album
1996	"Dealer"	Under These Rocks and Stones (Japanese version)
1996	"Love Is All"	Under These Rocks and Stones (Japanese version)
1998	"Leaving on a Jet Plane"	Armageddon: The Album
1999	"Feels Like Home"	Songs from Dawson's Creek
1999	"In My Life"	Providence soundtrack
2001	"Can't Make It Good" (with Raine Maida)	Theme song to Century Hotel
2001	"This Year"	Serendipity soundtrack
2002	"Another Small Adventure" (featuring Drew Barrymore)	Stuart Little 2 soundtrack
2002	"Leading Me Home"	Men with Brooms soundtrack
2003	"Feels Like Home"	How to Lose a Guy in 10 Days soundtrack
2003	"O Holy Night" (duet with Avril Lavigne)	Maybe This Christmas Too?
2003	"Redemption Song"	Peace Songs
2005	"Lebo's River – A Tribute" (with Raine Maida featuring Archie Khambula & Lebo Kgasapane)	Help!: A Day in the Life
2005	"I Want You to Know"	The Sisterhood of the Traveling Pants soundtrack
2005	"These Days"	The Sisterhood of the Traveling Pants soundtrack
2006	"I Do Believe"	Bonus track on USA version of Ghost Stories
2009	"In Waskada Somewhere"	Great Canadian Song Quest, 2009 edition
2010	"Cruel One" (with Alex Band featuring Emmy Rossum)	Bonus track on We've All Been There, Deluxe Edition
2011	"Over My Dead Body" (additional vocals with Drake)	Take Care

== Filmography ==
Film
Year	Film	Role	Notes
2000	Cleopatra (1912 film)		Film score (with Raine Maida)
2001	Century Hotel	Mary	
2006	Pretty Broken		Film short Producer
2013	The Spirit Game	Mamie Hopkins	Short film Co-executive producer Composer
2017	Kiss and Cry	May Allison	
2017	Road to Nowhere	Eileen	

Television
Year	Film	Role	Notes
2001	Big Sound	Herself	
2001	Musicians in the WarZone	Herself	
2006	Shakin' All Over	Herself	Documentary
2007	Who Do You Think You Are?	Herself	Episode: "Chantal Kreviazuk"
2011	Life Is a Highway: Canadian Pop Music in the 1990s	Herself	Documentary mini-series
2011	The Gift of Giving	Herself	
2019	I'm Going to Break Your Heart	Herself	Documentary

== Awards and nominations ==
- Order of Canada, member

=== Juno Awards ===
Year	Nominee / work	Award	Result
1997	Chantal Kreviazuk	Best New Artist	Nominated
2000	Chantal Kreviazuk	Best Female Artist	Won
2000	Colour Moving and Still	Best Pop/Adult Album	Won
2007	"All I Can Do"	Single of the Year	Nominated
2007	Ghost Stories	Pop Album of the Year	Nominated
2014	Chantal Kreviazuk; Raine Maida	Allan Waters Humanitarian Award	Won
2017	Hard Sail	Adult Contemporary Album of the Year	Nominated
