= All I Can Do (Chantal Kreviazuk song) =

"All I Can Do" is a song by Canadian recording artist Chantal Kreviazuk, and was the first single from her fourth album, Ghost Stories (2006).

The music video for "All I Can Do" premiered on Canada's music channel MuchMoreMusic on July 24, 2006 in a half-hour segment called "Inside the Video: Chantal Kreviazuk", which featured on-set interviews with the singer-songwriter and a behind-the-scenes look at the making of the video. On October 4, 2006, the single was certified Gold for 10,000 digital sales in Canada. It also received a Single of the Year nomination from the 2007 Juno Awards.

== Charts ==
=== Weekly charts ===
2006–2007 weekly chart performance for "All I Can Do"
Chart (2006–2007)	Peak position
Canada (Canadian Hot 100)	66
Canada AC (Billboard)	2
Canada CHR/Top 40 (Billboard)	35
Canada Hot AC (Billboard)	3
