= Feels like Home (Randy Newman song) =

Song

"Feels like Home" is a song written by Randy Newman for the musical Randy Newman's Faust, in which it was sung by Bonnie Raitt. Linda Ronstadt, also involved in the musical, recorded it for Trio II in 1994 and released it on her solo album Feels like Home in March 1995. Raitt's version was released on the musical's album soundtrack in September 1995 and was also used the following year in the soundtrack to the film Michael. Linda Ronstadt's original version, with Emmylou Harris and Dolly Parton, the latter of whom was mixed out of Ronstadt's original release due to label disputes, was released in 1999.

== Original version personnel ==
- Randy Newman - vocals, piano
- Bonnie Raitt - vocals
- Mark Goldenberg - guitar
- Doug Livingston - pedal steel
- Benmont Tench - Hammond B-3 organ
- Randy Waldman - synthesizer
- James Hutchinson - bass
- Kenny Aronoff - drums

== Chantal Kreviazuk version ==
"Feels like Home"

Single by Chantal Kreviazuk

from the album Songs from Dawson's Creek and How to Lose a Guy in 10 Days (soundtrack)
- Released: 1999
- Length: 4:42
- Label: Columbia
- Songwriter: Randy Newman

Chantal Kreviazuk singles chronology
| "Leaving on a Jet Plane" (1998) | "Feels like Home" (1999) | "Before You" (1999) |

The most successful version of the song was a version sung by Chantal Kreviazuk and released as a single from the 1999 soundtrack Songs from Dawson's Creek. The Kreviazuk version reached the top 40 in Ireland and the top 20 in the Canadian adult contemporary chart, and was later included on some editions of her 2002 album What If It All Means Something.

=== Charts ===
| Chart (1999–2000) | Peak position |
|---|---|
| Irish Singles Chart | 40 |
| Canadian Adult Contemporary | 12 |

== Other versions ==
Various other artists have recorded the song, including:

- Randy Newman for his 2008 album Harps and Angels, as well as live versions in the 1998 box set Guilty: 30 Years of Randy Newman and the 2011 album Live in London
- Edwina Hayes for her 2008 album Pour Me A Drink and the soundtrack to the film My Sister's Keeper
- Josh Groban for some editions of his 2010 album Illuminations
- Neil Diamond for his 2010 album Dreams
- Jai McDowall for his 2011 album Believe
- Aled Jones for his 2011 album Forever
- Diana Krall and Bryan Adams for Krall's 2015 album Wallflower
- Judy Collins and Jackson Browne for Collins' 2015 album Strangers Again
