= 2007 in Irish music =

This is a summary of the year 2007 in the Irish music industry. 2007 was described as "an annus horribilis for Irish music" by the Irish Independent's rock critic, Eamon Sweeney.

== Summary ==
=== January ===
- Changes to the Irish chart rules, which allow for downloads to be taken into account in formulating the music charts came into force at the beginning of January. This sparked an unpredictable trend in old songs returning to the charts (for example "Bohemian Rhapsody" which returned to the charts for a week in February). Radio DJs (including Today FM's Ray Foley) were able to use their influence by requesting that the public download specific songs allowing them to return to the charts.
- On Tuesday 2 January, while being interviewed by Jo Whiley on BBC Radio One, Bono spoke of his desire to reinvent U2's sound for their next album due to be released at the end of the year.
- Hot Press announced their "Out A Tout campaign", following revelations that a number of touts selling on tickets for an Arcade Fire gig in Dublin's Olympia Theatre at inflated prices. Tickets for the gig sold out inside ten minutes but 24 hours later turned up on eBay for €250 (increasing to €350 48 hours later). Concert promoter MCD urged the Government to act on closing down online touts and pointed an accusing finger at "media outlets who carry advertisements on behalf of ticket touts". Peter Aiken of Aiken Promotions proffered: "...these professional American-style 'brokers' could be shut down overnight. The same goes for the guys you see selling tickets outside venues, ours included."

=== February ===
- On 1 February, Snow Patrol dominated the 2007 Meteor Awards, where they collected four awards. Legendary 2fm DJ, Larry Gogan won a Meteor Award for his Outstanding Contribution to Music.
- Meanwhile, head of 2fm, John Clarke, announced the latest in a spate of reschedules for the station, which would see Gogan move from weekday afternoons to a new shoe on Saturdays and Sundays, Rick O'Shea move to Gogan's earlier afternoon slot and Colm and JimJim and their Strawberry Alarm Clock being poached from FM104. The changes would come into play on 5 March.
- On 19 February, Aerosmith announced that they would be playing Marlay Park in Dublin on Tuesday 26 June as part of their European tour. This follows announcements that The Who will also play Marlay Park and Arctic Monkeys and Bell X1 would be playing Malahide Castle in June.
- On Thursday 22 February, tickets for Arctic Monkeys performance at Malahide Castle in June went on sale at 9 a.m.
- On Thursday 22 February, Paul Noonan of Bell X1 was guest presenter on Today FM's Pet Sounds between 7 p.m. and 9 p.m.
- Also on Thursday 22 February, the Oxegen 2007 line-up was officially announced. Amongst the first acts announced were Snow Patrol, Muse, Arcade Fire, Daft Punk, Bloc Party, The Fratellis, Kings of Leon, Cansei de Ser Sexy, Interpol and Amy Winehouse. The festival was officially launched on 27 February, with the announcement that The Killers would be headlining the Main Stage on the Sunday night.
- Also on 27 February, the death was announced of legendary Irish music promoter Jim Aiken, the founder of Aiken Promotions. He was best known for the recent series of concerts in the grounds of Stormont in Belfast and for travelling the world to encourage bands and singers to come to Northern Ireland at the height of the Troubles. He was also revered for closely associating with stars such as Elton John, Cliff Richard, Luciano Pavarotti and Garth Brooks.
- The Choice Music Prize for the Irish Album of the Year 2006 was awarded at Vicar Street to The Divine Comedy for the album Victory for the Comic Muse on 28 February 2007.

=== March ===
- Tickets for Oxegen 2007 went on general sale on 3 March at 8 a.m. and sold out within an hour and a half.
- March also saw the announcement of another Marlay Park gig for the summer. Foo Fighters played Marlay Park on Wednesday 22 August as part of the Bud Rising concert series.
- On 22 March, The Rolling Stones confirmed they would be headlining Slane 2007 on 18 August. Tickets went on sale on Friday 30 March.
- Tickets for The Garden Party went on sale on Saturday 24 March at 9 a.m. The festival took place at Ballinlough Castle in Athboy, County Meath on Saturday 9 June and was headlined by Pet Shop Boys.
- On Thursday 29 March, Bono was presented with an honorary knighthood by the British ambassador to Ireland in recognition of his services to the music industry and for his humanitarian work.

=== April ===
- On Monday 2 April, Electric Picnic 2007 was officially launched with the first acts to be confirmed including Beastie Boys, Björk, Iggy and The Stooges, Sonic Youth, Jarvis Cocker, The Go! Team, LCD Soundsystem, Primal Scream, Clap Your Hands Say Yeah, The Undertones, Modest Mouse, The Magic Numbers, Damien Dempsey, The Jesus and Mary Chain and The Good, the Bad & the Queen.
- Also on 2, 18 April more acts were announced for the Oxegen 2007 festival. These included Queens of the Stone Age, Bright Eyes, Ocean Colour Scene and Avril Lavigne.
- Tickets for Electric Picnic 2007 went on sale on Tuesday 3 April.
- On Friday 13 April, Nine Inch Nails were confirmed as the main support act to Foo Fighters for their Marlay Park concert on 22 August 2007.
- On the same day, The Police confirmed they would be playing a concert in Croke Park on Saturday 6 October 2007 as part of their first European Tour since their reformation. Tickets went on sale on Friday 20 April and sold out within 90 minutes.
- On Wednesday 24 April, Bono appeared in a prerecorded segment of American Idol's two-hour special Idol Gives Back, where he talked about the work of ONE: The Campaign to Make Poverty History.
- On the same day, the full line-up for Damien Rice's Saturday 25 August gig in Marlay Park, Dublin was announced. It included KT Tunstall, Guillemots, Willy Mason and Fionn Regan.

=== May ===
- The May bank holiday weekend was the occasion of the first festival of the Irish summer. On Saturday 5 May and Sunday 6 May, Heineken Green Energy at Dublin Castle was headlined by Kasabian and Sinéad O'Connor with support coming from The Blizzards, Future Kings of Spain, Kíla and Delorentos.
- On Friday 11, 14 May new acts were officially announced for the Oxegen 2007 festival. These included: Sinéad O'Connor, Rodrigo y Gabriela, Satellite Party, Badly Drawn Boy, The Brian Jonestown Massacre, Albert Hammond, Jr., The Blizzards and The Immediate.
- Also on Friday 11 May, the annual Trinity Ball took place at Trinity College Dublin. Headlined by Ash, CSS, Director and The Blizzards, it was also The Immediate's last public performance before their subsequent demise.
- On Sunday 13 May and just two days after being officially announced for Oxegen, The Immediate announced on their MySpace page that they were "splitting up due to existential differences". They later released one last tune, "The Mist Above The Mind" (recorded in demo form), on their MySpace page which could be downloaded for free.
- On Saturday 26 May, Red Bull X-Fighters came to Ireland. The show, at Slane Castle, was watched by over 35,000 spectators with music was provided by Ash, Director and The Blizzards.
- The Rory Gallagher International Tribute Festival took place in Ballyshannon, County Donegal from Thursday 31 May until Sunday 3 June.

=== June ===
- Garden Party took place at Ballinlough Castle in Athboy, County Meath on Saturday 9 June from 2 p.m. until 2 a.m. It was headlined by Pet Shop Boys, Burning Spear, Carl Cox and Hot Chip. The festival was a resounding success and the organisers immediately announced its return in 2008. Organiser John Reynolds said: "This is the second year and like everything it takes two or three years for a festival to find its feet but if all goes well, it'll be an annual event from now on."
- On Tuesday 12 June, the full line-up and stage breakdown for five of the six stages for Oxegen 2007 was announced. New acts to be officially announced included Director, The View, Maxïmo Park, Editors, The Bravery, The Cribs, The Thrills, The Twang, Calvin Harris, Jet, Delorentos and David Kitt. The New Bands Stage line-up was announced later.
- On Wednesday 13 June, Ash confirmed their forthcoming album, Twilight of the Innocents would be their last album.
- Arctic Monkeys played Malahide Castle on Saturday 16 June. Tickets sold out immediately and a second date at the same venue was announced for Sunday 17 June. Support came from Supergrass, The Coral and Delorentos. It was to be the first of many occasions that the castle would be used as a concert venue.
- Crowded House and Peter Gabriel played a rain-soaked Marlay Park on Friday 22 June. They were supported by Starsailor.
- Aerosmith played Marlay Park on Tuesday 26 June as part of their European tour. They were supported by Chris Cornell and The Feeling.
- Live at the Marquee took place in Cork between 26 June and 7 July, with headlining acts including The Who, Slayer, The Flaming Lips, Bell X1 and Status Quo.
- The Who played Marlay Park on Friday 29 June and were Live at the Marquee in Cork on Saturday 30 June as part of their European tour of 2007. They were supported by Velvet Revolver and Biffy Clyro at the Marlay Park gig.
- Bell X1 played Malahide Castle on Saturday 30 June. They were supported by Duke Special, Jape and Herman Düne. Gates opened at 4 p.m. Herman Dune began proceedings at 5:45 p.m., Jape were on at 6:45 p.m. and Duke Special at 7:45 p.m., before Bell X1 took to the stage at 9 p.m. Bell X1 were also Live at the Marquee in Cork on Sunday 1 July where they were supported by Duke Special.

=== July ===
- Damien Rice and Snow Patrol were amongst the acts that played the Live Earth series of concerts that took place around the world on Saturday 7 July. This occurred on the same weekend as this year's Oxegen festival, of which Gary Lightbody also confirmed that Snow Patrol would be playing on the same day as Live Earth.
- Oxegen 07 took place at Punchestown Racecourse in County Kildare on Saturday 7 July and Sunday 8 July. It was headlined by Muse, The Killers, Snow Patrol, Arcade Fire and Scissor Sisters.
- On Friday 13 July, The Aftermath were involved in a near-fatal bus crash just outside Kilbeggan in County Westmeath. Four members of the band and two members of their crew were treated for injuries after the accident. The band were in the middle of an extensive Irish tour.
- On Tuesday 17 July, it was announced that Fionn Regan had been nominated for the 2007 Mercury Prize for his debut release, The End of History.
- The first Lovebox Dublin took place at Malahide Castle in County Dublin on 21 July, headlined by Super Furry Animals, Groove Armada and The Rapture.

=== August ===
- Castlepalooza 2007 took place at Charleville Castle in Tullamore, County Offaly over the August Bank Holiday weekend (4 and 5).
- Indie-pendence 07 also took place on the same weekend (Friday 3 and Monday 6). Ireland's only free independent music festival took place at New Square in Mitchelstown, County Cork. Bands that played included Ham Sandwich Republic of Loose, The Chapters, Director, Delorentos, The Aftermath, The Sultans of Ping FC, Fight Like Apes and Vesta Varro.
- On Friday 10 August, tickets went on sale for the "Big Top" Arcade Fire gig in Phoenix Park on 24 October. The gig sold out within ten minutes despite it being the band's third appearance in Ireland in 2007 (following the similarly quick selling Olympia date in February and their Oxegen date in July).
- Slane 2007 took place on Saturday 18 August and was headlined for a second time by The Rolling Stones. The band last played Slane in 1982. Support came from The Charlatans, The Hold Steady, Tinariwen and Frankie Gavin. It was the band's last ever performance on Irish soil.
- In the first of two Bud Rising Summer outdoor concerts, Foo Fighters played Marlay Park on Wednesday 22 August. They were supported by Nine Inch Nails and Silversun Pickups.
- Damien Rice played Marlay Park on Saturday 25 August. He was supported by KT Tunstall, Guillemots, Willy Mason and Fionn Regan.
- In the second of two Bud Rising Summer outdoor concerts, Kaiser Chiefs played Marlay Park on Sunday 26 August. They were supported by The Fratellis, Ash, The Blizzards and Royseven.

=== September ===
- Electric Picnic 2007 took place in Stradbally Hall, County Laois from Friday 31 August until Sunday 3 September.
- Cois Fharraige took place in Kilkee, County Clare from 7 September until 9. It featured Fun Lovin' Criminals, Ocean Colour Scene, Badly Drawn Boy, The Enemy, Republic of Loose, The Blizzards and Delorentos.
- The 5th Hard Working Class Heroes festival in association with Bud Rising is scheduled to take place in Dublin between 28 and 30 September and will be staged around Tripod, The Pod and Crawdaddy. The Jimmy Cake, The Concretes and Jape will headline.

=== October ===
- Music Ireland took place in the RDS Main Hall in Dublin from Friday 5 October until Sunday 7 October. MUSIC IRELAND 07 :: HOME The Sennheiser Live Stage was headlined by Paddy Casey, The Frank and Walters, The Walls, Neosupervital, The Flaws, Dirty Epics, Messiah J & The Expert, Royseven, The Kinetiks and The Kerbs.
- The Police played Croke Park on Saturday 6 October. They were supported by Fiction Plane. A further date was to be announced.
- Heineken Green Synergy took place for a second year between Wednesday 10 October and Sunday 14. Amongst the bands and artists playing were Lightspeed Champion (Wednesday in Whelan's), Alabama 3 and Republic of Loose (Thursday in Tripod), Neosupervital (Thursday in Whelan's), Asian Dub Foundation (Friday in Tripod), The Flaws and Ham Sandwich (Friday in Whelan's), Turin Brakes (Saturday in Tripod), Archie Bronson Outfit and The Chakras (Saturday in The Village). Venues ranged from Tripod, Anseo, Whelan's, The Village, Solas and Carnival.
- The Sunday Business Post was the first to break the news that MCD will host a series of eight gigs in the Phoenix Park between 16 October and 5 November. There will be a capacity of 10,000 people per gig. The gigs will all take place indoors, meaning a marquee similar to Cork's Live at the Marquee series being erected in the Phoenix Park. In the end only six such musical events took place.
  - Arcade Fire was the first such concert to be announced, taking place on Wednesday 24 October. Support came from Clinic and Wild Light. Arcade Fire later announced a second date, Tuesday the 23rd, also with support from Clinic.
  - Ian Brown became the second act to be named to play the "Big Top" gigs. He played the Phoenix Park on Sunday 28 October. He was supported by Reverend and the Makers. Other bands rumoured to be playing were the reformed Verve and Interpol.

=== November ===
- On Friday 2 November it was officially announced that Oxegen would return in the summer of 2008.
- Bloc Party played a date in the Big Top on Saturday 3 November. They were supported by Biffy Clyro and Foals.
- Enrique Iglesias played the Big Top on Monday 5 November. He was supported by Ray Foley.
- Manu Chao played the Big Top on Sunday 4 November.
- On Friday 9 November, early bird tickets for Electric Picnic 2008 went on sale at the same price as those of the 2007 festival.
- On 15 November, My Bloody Valentine announced they were to reform and perform three dates in the UK in 2008.
- On Friday 23 November, details of Oxegen 2008 were officially announced. The festival will take place from Friday 11 July until Sunday 13 July at Punchestown Racecourse in Naas, County Kildare. It will be a three-day affair for the first time ever.
- On Tuesday 27 November, Kings of Leon became the first band to be announced to play Oxegen 2008. The band topped an online poll which asked festival-goers for their dream line-up and so the band were immediately confirmed.
- On Friday 30 November, presale tickets for Oxegen 2008 went on sale.

=== December ===
- On 10 December Glen Hansard received two Grammy nominations. He and Marketa Irglova, his co-star in Once were nominated for "Best Compilation Soundtrack Album" and "Best Song Written for Motion Picture, Television or Other Visual Media" for the track "Falling Slowly" from Once.

== Bands formed ==
- Concerto For Constantine (August)
- Dirty Epics
- Music for Dead Birds

== Bands disbanded ==
- Damien Rice & Lisa Hannigan (26 March)
- Envelope (changed name to Subplots)
- The Immediate (announced via MySpace page on Sunday 13 May)
- Emily (announced via MySpace page on Sunday 7 October)
- Barntown Water Tastes Like Blood

== Bands reformed ==
- My Bloody Valentine (announced in November)

== Albums & EPs ==
Below is a list of notable albums & EPs released by Irish artists in Ireland in 2007.

January – April

- When The Night Time Comes – Jenny Lindfors (March 2007)
- Super Extra Bonus Party LP – Super Extra Bonus Party (15 April 2007)
- In Love with Detail – Delorentos (21 April 2007)
- Misfits Volume 1 – David Kitt (April 2007)
- Far from Refuge – God Is an Astronaut (April 2007)

May – August

- Are You Listening? – Dolores O'Riordan (7 May 2007)
- How Am I Supposed to Kill You If You Have All the Guns? – Fight Like Apes (18 May 2007) (EP)
- To Hell or Barbados – Damien Dempsey (June 2007)
- Exit Here – Vesto Varro (8 June 2007)
- Tour De Flock – Bell X1 (15 June 2007) (Live CD & DVD)
- Twilight of the Innocents – Ash (29 June 2007)
- Wild Psychotic Sounds – The Things (29 June 2007) (EP)
- Hope – Foy Vance (1 July 2007) (re-released 7 September 2007)
- Teenager – The Thrills (20 July 2007)
- Charm Offensive – The Radio (20 July 2007) (10 August 2007)

September – December

- The Monkey Pole – Hybrasil (7 September 2007)
- Addicted to Company (Part 1) – Paddy Casey (7 September 2007)
- Kill Your Darlings – David Geraghty (7 September 2007)
- Achieving Vagueness – The Flaws (14 September 2007)
- Big bad beautiful world – Declan O'Rourke (14 September 2007)
- Nervousystem – Future Kings of Spain (28 September 2007)
- Songs from the Deep Forest (Special Edition) – Duke Special (1 October 2007)
- Heroes or Ghosts – The Coronas (5 October 2007) Upcoming Gigs
- For Some Strange Reason – Aslan (5 October 2007)
- Dead Start Program – Dark Room Notes (12 October 2007)
- Tales of Silversleeve – Cathy Davey (12 October 2007)
- Dig Yourself Deep – The Undertones (15 October 2007)
- David Carradine is a Bounty Hunter Whos Robotic Arm Hates Your Crotch (EP) – Fight Like Apes (2 November 2007)
- To Hell or Barbados (Special Edition) – Damien Dempsey (2 November 2007)
- Do You Realise – Delorentos (9 November 2007) (EP)
- To The Nameless Dead – Primordial (24 November 2007)
- Live from the Union Chapel – Damien Rice (26 November 2007) (live album)

== Singles ==
Below is a list of notable singles released by Irish artists in Ireland in 2007.

Issue date	Song title	Artist	Source	Sales
1 January	"Window in the Skies"	U2		
5 January	"Leave It to Me"	Director		
29 January	"Freewheel"	Duke Special		
5 February	"Rootless Tree"	Damien Rice		
9 February	"Fantasy"	The Blizzards		
12 February	"Open Your Eyes"	Snow Patrol		
February	"I'm Revived"	Royseven		
16 February	"Click... Click... BOOM!"	Ham Sandwich		
16 February	"Rubicon"	The Kybosh		
16 February	"Place Your Bets"	Messiah J & The Expert		
23 February	"Basis of Everything"	Delorentos		
30 March	"Guess Again"	Future Kings of Spain		
16 April	"You Can't Have It All"	Ash		
April	"Eustace Street"	Delorentos		
7 May	"Signal Fire"	Snow Patrol		
11 May	"Be with You"	Director		
18 May	"Sixteen"	The Flaws		
18 May	"One of Two Ways"	The Radio		
May	"All the Other Girls"	Messiah J & The Expert		
25 May	"Pyramid Clocks"	Vesta Varro		
June	"Love Like Nicotine"	Dark Room Notes		
15 June	"Polaris"	Ash		
15 June	"On the Right Track"	The Blizzards		
15 June	"Good One"	Fred		
15 June	"Fear the Hitcher"	David Geraghty		
22 June	"God Bless the Devil"	Hybrasil		
13 July	"Nothing Changes Round Here"	The Thrills		
20 July	"All I Want for You is to be Happy"	The Aftermath		
20 July	"Here Comes the Sun"	Aslan		
20 July	"Stop"	Delorentos		
27 July	"Kick in the Teeth"	Future Kings of Spain		
3 August	"Big Bad Beautiful World"	Declan O'Rourke		
10 August	"Dogs"	Damien Rice		(download only)

End of year releases

- 7 September – "Kaleidoscope" – David Geraghty
- 10 September – "End of the World" – Ash
- 14 September – "Illegal Attacks" – Ian Brown feat. Sinéad O'Connor
- 14 September – "Crash" – Royseven
- 28 September – "Reuben" – Cathy Davey
- October – "Shuffle Your Feet" – The Kinetiks
- 7 October – "Damn you Hollywood" – Fred
- 2 November – "You & I" – The Flaws (Download only)

Date unknown

- "Bad Skin Day" – Bell X1 (??? 2007)
- ??? – The Cake Sale (??? 2007)

== Festivals ==
=== Oxegen 07 ===
- Oxegen 07 took place at Punchestown Racecourse in County Kildare on Saturday 7 July and Sunday 8 July. Acts to appear included The Killers, Snow Patrol, Muse, Arcade Fire, Bloc Party, Scissor Sisters, Interpol, Cansei de Ser Sexy, Queens of the Stone Age, Kings of Leon, Razorlight, Daft Punk, The Fratellis, Mika, Avril Lavigne and Tori Amos. Amy Winehouse gave organisers a headache and threw the entire Stage 2/NME schedule into chaos on the Sunday when she pulled out.

=== Electric Picnic 2007 ===
- Electric Picnic 2007 took place in Stradbally Estate, County Laois from Friday 31 August until Sunday 3 September. Acts to have appeared include Beastie Boys, Björk, Iggy and The Stooges, Sonic Youth, Jarvis Cocker, The Go! Team, LCD Soundsystem, Primal Scream, Clap Your Hands Say Yeah, The Undertones, Modest Mouse, The Magic Numbers, Damien Dempsey, The Jesus and Mary Chain and the Damon Albarn led The Good, the Bad & the Queen.

=== Heineken Green Energy ===
- Heineken Green Energy Festival took place for the 12th year in May 2007. Kasabian headlined the Heineken Green Energy festival on the Saturday of the May bank holiday weekend (5 May). They were supported by The Blizzards and Future Kings of Spain. Sinéad O'Connor headlined the Heineken Green Energy festival on the Sunday of the May bank holiday weekend (6 May). She was supported by Kíla and Delorentos.

=== Garden Party 2007 ===
- Garden Party 2007 took place in high temperatures at Ballinlough Castle in Athboy, County Meath on Saturday 9 June from 2 p.m. until 2 a.m. It was headlined by Pet Shop Boys, Burning Spear, Carl Cox and Hot Chip, whilst Vitalic arrived 45 minutes late due to a delayed flight but eventually made an appearance on the Main Stage.

=== Indie-pendence 07 ===
- Indie-pendence 07 took place from Friday 3 August until Monday 6 August. Ireland's only free independent music festival took place for the second consecutive year at New Square in Mitchelstown, County Cork. Bands that played included Noise control, Ham Sandwich Republic of Loose, The Chapters, Director, Delorentos, The Aftermath, The Sultans of Ping FC, Fight Like Apes and Vesta Varro.

=== Castlepalooza 07 ===
- Castlepalooza 2007 took place at Charleville Castle in Tullamore, County Offaly over the August Bank Holiday weekend (4 and 5). It was headlined by Sister Sledge, Noise Control, Mainline, The Chapters and Neosupervital.

=== Bud Rising ===
- Bud Rising Spring and Bud Rising Summer took place in 2007.

Bud Rising Spring took place from Sunday 1 April until Thursday 31 May. Gigs as ever took place in various venues throughout Dublin, including Dublin Castle, The Olympia and the Temple Bar Music Centre. Among the performances were Maxïmo Park at the Temple Bar Music Centre on Monday 21 May.

Bud Rising Summer saw two outdoor concerts take place in Marlay Park. Foo Fighters played Marlay Park on Wednesday 22 August, supported by Nine Inch Nails and Silversun Pickups. Kaiser Chiefs and The Fratellis played Marlay Park on Sunday 26 August. They were supported by Ash, The Blizzards and Royseven.

=== Live at the Marquee ===
- Live at the Marquee 2007 took place in the Docklands of Cork between 26 June and 7 July. Headlining acts include The Who, Slayer, The Flaming Lips, Bell X1 and Status Quo.

=== Slane 2007 ===
- Slane 2007 took place in wet conditions on Saturday 18 August and was headlined for a second time by The Rolling Stones. The band last played Slane in 1982. Support came from The Charlatans, The Hold Steady, Tinariwen and Frankie Gavin.

=== Hard Working Class Heroes 2007 ===
- This year's HWCH festival took place in the POD Complex on the weekend of the 28/29/30 September. Supported by Bud Rising, this weekend featured some emerging talents from Scandinavia as well as emerging Irish acts such as Ham Sandwich, The Flaws, Fight Like Apes, halves, Dark Room Notes, Super Extra Bonus Party, The Chakras and The Kybosh. Home

== Music awards ==
=== 2007 Meteor Awards ===
The 2007 Meteor Awards were hosted by television personalities Podge and Rodge and comedian Deirdre O'Kane on 1 February 2007. Below are the winners:

Award	Winner(s)
Best Irish Male	Damien Dempsey
Best Irish Female	Luan Parle
Best Irish Band	Snow Patrol
Best Irish Album	Eyes Open (Snow Patrol)
Best Irish Single	"Reconnect" (Director)
Best Irish Pop Act	Westlife
Best Live Performance	Snow Patrol (Dublin Castle 2006)
Best Irish DJ	Ray D'Arcy
Hope for 2007	Royseven
Most Downloaded Irish Song	"Chasing Cars" (Snow Patrol)
Best International Band	Scissor Sisters
Best International Album	Whatever People Say I Am, That's What I'm Not (Arctic Monkeys)
Outstanding Contribution to Music	Larry Gogan
Lifetime Achievement Award	Clannad

=== Choice Music Prize ===
The Choice Music Prize for Irish Album of the Year 2006 was awarded at Vicar Street to The Divine Comedy for the album Victory for the Comic Muse on 28 February 2007.
