= Director discography =

- Studio albums: 2
- Live albums: 1
- Singles: 5
- Music videos: 4

The discography of the Irish pop rock quartet Director, from their debut single "Reconnect" to their most recent single "Sing It Without a Tune".

== Albums ==
=== Studio albums ===
List of studio albums, with selected details, chart positions and certifications
Title	Details	Peak chart positions	Certifications
Title	Details	IRE	Certifications
We Thrive on Big Cities	Released: October 6, 2006; Label: Atlantic; Formats: CD, digital download	2	IRMA: Platinum (15,000+)
I'll Wait for Sound	Released: May 8, 2009; Label: Crapshoot Economics; Formats: CD, digital download	11	

=== Live albums ===
- Even Better Than the Disco Thing (November 21, 2008; 1-track contribution)

== Singles ==
List of singles, with selected chart positions, showing year released and album name
Title	Year	Peak chart positions	Album
Title	Year	IRE	Album
"Reconnect"	2006	10	We Thrive on Big Cities
"Come with a Friend"	2006	26	We Thrive on Big Cities
"Leave It to Me"	2007	17	We Thrive on Big Cities
"Be with You"	2007	43	Non-album single
"Sing It Without a Tune"	2009	—	I'll Wait for Sound
"—" denotes a recording that did not chart or was not released in that territory.
