= Castlepalooza =

Music and arts festival in Ireland

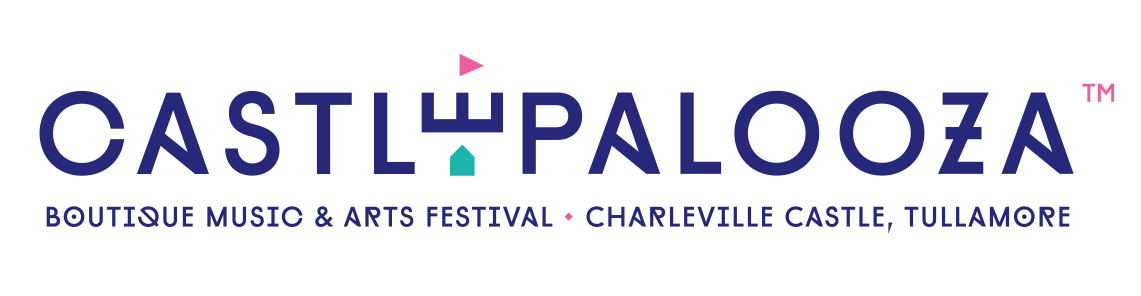
- Castle Palooza logo, circa 2016
- Dates: 1–3 July
- Locations: Charleville Castle, Tullamore, County Offaly, Ireland
- Years active: 2005 to 2018

Castlepalooza was an annual Irish independent music & Arts Festival, held at Charleville Castle in Tullamore, County Offaly. The festival began in 2005 and was held annually until 2018.

The 2006 festival was described by Hot Press as a "bite-sized Electric Picnic, held in the grounds of a 17th-century castle, with the added bonus of indoor toilets and showers". The festival was described by The Sunday Business Post as "The best little music festival in Ireland".

In February 2019, the festival's promoters announced that Castlepalooza would be taking a break, would not be running that year and were looking to alter their format. This hiatus was further extended due to the COVID-19 pandemic which ruled out a return in 2020 and 2021, leading to the festival's demise.

== Background ==
Castlepalooza first took place in 2005 created by Katie Vance – this resulted in Castlepalooza 2006. It is promoted by Cherrycool Promotions.The festival tends to focus on newer and more established Irish acts. The first Castlepalooza had around 1,000 people in attendance but, whilst this has since increased to 4,999, Cherrycool Promotions intend to keep the capacity low. One of the unusual traits of the festival is that those who attend can walk around the castle on site and discover events hidden within.

== 2006 festival ==
The 2006 festival was held on the weekend of 30 July and was headlined by The Chapters, Saucy Monky, 8 Ball and The Blizzards, with penfold dm on the Saturday, whilst Republic of Loose and Delorentos took to the stage on Sunday with The Spikes beginning in an early morning slot. Also playing were The Gorgeous Colours, The Chakras and Neosupervital.

== 2007 festival ==
The 2007 festival was headlined by Sister Sledge, Noise Control, Mainline, The Chapters and Neosupervital. It took place alongside the free Indiependence festival which is set to occur in Mitchelstown, County Cork on the same weekend. Castlepalooza, however, had full camping facilities and tickets were priced at €125. 40 bands took to two stages located in the castle grounds.

== 2008 festival ==
The 2008 festival took place over the August Bank Holiday weekend. A number of international bands were booked, including South African band The Parlotones and the UK's Mystery Jets. They played the tiny event alongside Irish acts such as Republic of Loose, Fight Like Apes and The Flaws. Profits from the festival went towards the ongoing restoration project at Charleville Castle, which has been in progress for 12 years.

Grand Pocket Orchestra and Joe Echo won slots at the 2008 event by triumphing in the Hot Press "Your Band at Castlepalooza" competition. Dublin quartet Grand Pocket Orchestra trade in a distinctive "Pavement meets Liza Minnelli" brand of indie, whilst singer-songwriter Joe Echo, aka Ciaran Gribbin, has won massive acclaim left, right, centre – and Gary Lightbody.

== 2009 festival ==
The 2009 festival took place on 1 – 2 August. The line-up was announced on 22 April, including David Kitt, Dark Room Notes, Project Jenny, Project Jan, R.S.A.G., Channel One, Robotnik, The Lost Brothers, Noise Control, 8 Ball, Glint and Le Galaxie. More acts were announced on 2 June 2009; these included The Followers of Otis, Super Extra Bonus Party, 202s, Skibunny, The Lowly Knights, Toy Horses, Scribble Sound System, The Hot Sprockets, So Cow, Yngve & the Innocent, Hogan, Land Lovers, Lauren Guillery, The Spikes, Angel Pier and Not Squares. Other entertainments include live performances of the Rocky Horror Picture Show, "crafternoon tea" and the Castle Palooza "party bus".

Two bands were selected from twenty finalists chosen by the festival and Hot Press. Killer Chloe were chosen to play the Saturday, whilst The Red Labels were chosen to play the Sunday.

== 2010 festival ==
31 July and 1 August 2010. The following line-up was announced on 7 April 2010: Mercury Rev (Saturday), Fionn Regan, Wave Machines, Taylor McFerrin, Codes, Cashier No. 9, Lonelady, Adebisi Shank, Tu-Ki, James Vincent McMorrow, O Emperor, Robotnik, Alessis Ark, Colm Lynch, Funeral Suits, The Cast of Cheers, The Lowly Knights, Readers Wives, Samantha Marais, Attention Bebe, Funzo, The Blue Choir, Sarsparilla, Yes Cadets, Daithí Ó Drónaí, Big Dish Go, Sounds of System Breakdown, Nakatomi Towers, Heroes in Hiding, Neptune City, Mercy The Sexton and DJs Steve Reddy and Scope.

== 2011 festival ==
29 to 31 July 2011. This year's festival had a maximum capacity of 3,000 attendees. The following line up was announced (in alphabetical order). Naughty by Nature, Clock Opera, Django Django, Hudson Mohawke, Daithi O Dronai, Admiral Fallow, Elaine Mai, Adebisi Shank, Bad to the Bone DJs, BigDishGo, Codes, Conall Bailey, Dazboy, Dogs, El Hombre Jokes, Electric Penguins, Enemies, Go Panda Go, Jape, Jogging, Kid Karate, Lasertom & the Blast Crew, Le Galaxie, Lost Chord, The Moths!, Onra, Papa Gee & The Colours Afrobeat Foundation, Planet Parade, Sacred Animals, Sleep Thieves, Squarehead, Steve Reddy, The Casanova Wave, The Danger Is, The Jimmy Cake, The Minutes, The Riptide Movement, The Young Folk, These Charming Men, Toby Karr, TransAutoRadio, Tu-Ki, Visionair, We Are Losers. Many more acts were announced closer to festival date. Including but not limited to. Attention Bebe, Doved DJs, Krystal Klear, The Kanyu Tree, Mercury Rev DJ's, We Cut Corners, Moths, Maud in Cahoots, Diamond Dagger, Dry the Rive, Evil C, The Pacifics, Somadrone, Bitches With Wolves, Ghost Estates.

== 2012 festival ==
3 to 5 August 2012. The first line of acts was announced on 26 April. including The Charlatans, Mercury Prize-nominated singer Ghostpoet, new British "glam-folk" artist King Charles and UK beat producer Jon Phonics.Donal Dineen's Parish, Little Green Cars and recent Choice Music Prize winner Jape are among the Irish acts on the bill. The Festival also features dan le sac vs Scroobius Pip, Solar Bears, Mmoths, The Ambience Affair, Hush War Cry, Bouts, Le Galaxie, Katie Kim, Windings, Big dish go, Arman Giorgio, Cat Dowling, Cloud Castle lake, Diamond Dagger, DJ Baz, Double Agent 7, John Blek & the rats, Maria V, Melodica Deathship, Misselayneous, North Strand Kontra Band, REID, The Altered Hours, The Violet Roadkills, Toby Karr, Trumpets of Jericho, Tu-Ki, Young Wonder, and Many more.
