= The Kinetiks =

- Origin: Dublin, Ireland
- Genres: Rock, pop, indie
- Years active: 2007 – 2009
- Members: Gaz Harding; Sean Brennan; Jim McGuire; Paul Donohoe/John McIntosh
- Website: http://www.thekinetiks.com/

The Kinetiks were a Meteor Award-nominated Irish rock, pop and indie musical ensemble from Dublin. They were vocalist and guitarist Gaz Harding, guitarist Sean Brennan, bassist Jim McGuire, and drummer Paul Donohoe. On 11 July 2008, they performed their biggest show thus far at Oxegen 2008 where they appeared second on the Green Room stage following Dirty Epics and prior to The Saw Doctors. They have also performed at the inaugural annual surf festival Cois Fharraige on 8 September 2007, Indie-pendence in August 2008 and Hard Working Class Heroes in September 2008.

== Formation ==
The band formed in 2007. They shared influences such as the Beach Boys, The Strokes, The Who and The Beatles. On first hearing the band's track "A Smile'd Crack Your Face" RTÉ 2fm's producer, Ian Wilson booked the Dubliners for a live session with the station. "A Smile’d Crack Your Face", released on the band's debut EP High Horse Olympics in summer 2007 became a favourite of RTÉ 2fm DJs Dan Hegarty and Jenny Huston as well as Ray Foley on Today FM and drew the attention of producer Gareth Mannix, who had previous experience working with Director, Delorentos, Republic of Loose and Humanzi. With Mannix The Kinetiks recorded the singles "Shuffle Your Feet" and "Bite the Bullet", described by The Irish Times as "Kin brilliant." Their Aye Aye Aye Aye EP is due for release on 6 March, the E.P was recorded in Grouse Lodge Studios, Westmeath, Sun Studios Dublin and Suite Studios Dublin by Marc Carolan (Muse/The Cure) and Gareth Mannix (The Thrills/The Flaws) and an album is forthcoming.

== Break Up ==
In August 2009 Gaz Harding published a blog on the band's Myspace stating that The Kinetiks were no more. "People wanting different things from their lives" was the only reason given in the blog for the band's break-up.

== Notable performances ==
The Kinetiks appeared on The Once a Week Show on 6 October 2007.

They have also sold out the music venue Whelan's of Wexford Street in Dublin, topped the Phantom airplay chart and have provided support for a range of bands including The Enemy in the Ambassador Theatre, Young Knives and Scouting for Girls. The band have achieved considerable airplay on other radio stations such as RTÉ 2fm and Today FM.

At Oxegen 2008, The Kinetiks followed Dirty Epics onto the Green Room stage. In an interview with the Irish Independent beforehand, the band said they relished the prospects of playing in front of their biggest audience to date. Vocalist Gaz Harding (23) said:

"We're not nervous, just looking forward to it. Obviously the tent is massive. We're going to go and do what we do and hope that everyone will be blown away and we can go out and have a great night afterwards."

On 16 January 2009, The Kinetiks featured on Aidan Power's The Cafe, performing "Lightbulb" the lead track from their "Aye Aye Aye Aye" EP.

In July 2009, they supported the charity music site Music Box For Life.Com by donating some of their music.

== Discography ==
Year	Title
2007	High Horse Olympics EP
2007	"Shuffle Your Feet"
2008	"Bite the Bullet"
2009	Aye Aye Aye Aye EP

== Awards ==
=== Meteor Music Awards ===
The Kinetiks received a nomination in the category "Hope for 2008" at the 2008 Meteor Awards but lost to Ham Sandwich at the ceremony on 15 February 2008.

Year	Nominee / work	Award	Result
2008	The Kinetiks	Hope for 2008	Nominated
