= In Love with Detail =

Studio album by Delorentos
- Released: 20 April 2007 (Ireland)
- Recorded: In four week-long sessions between November 2006 and February 2007.
- Genre: Alternative rock, indie
- Label: Cottage Records/DeloRecords

Delorentos chronology
Leave It On (2005)	In Love with Detail (2007)	Little Sparks (2012)

Professional ratings
Review scores
Source	Rating
Hot Press	4.5/5 stars

In Love with Detail is the debut album by Delorentos released on 21 April 2007. It reached #7 in the Irish Singles Chart and was subsequently nominated for the Choice Music Prize for Irish Album of the Year 2007.

== Album information ==
Composed in between relentless touring in 2006, the album blends heavy rock ("Waiting" + "Until the next time"), alternative rock ("Basis of Everything", "Any Other Way") with more mainstream pop-indie ("Do You Realise", "Stop"). Written, played, and co-produced (with Engineer Gareth Mannix) by Níal, Ross, Ronan and Kier, the self-funded record was released on their own DeloRecords, and distributed by their managers label, Cottage Records. The album was recorded with Gareth Mannix in four week-long sessions between November 2006 and February 2007. Mannix had previously worked with Republic of Loose, The Chalets and The Blizzards.

To support the release, the track "Eustace Street" was released as a download on the same day. The next physical release was the single "Stop" in July 2007. It contained the tracks "Stop" (a remixed single version), "She's So Modern" and a remix of "Stop" by Irish V2 artist Jape called "Stop – What a Comedown".

== Further details ==
Delorentos recorded their debut album in Dublin's Sun and Apollo Studios with Gareth Mannix. In Love with Detail was released on their own Cottage Records label on 20 April 2007. The album entered the Irish Albums Chart at #7, spending five weeks in that chart, and later received a nomination for the Choice Music Prize. The majority of the album was written over the previous year. The iTunes Version of the album comes with bonus track Neon, later included on the Do You Realise Ep.

== Track listing ==
No.	Title	Lyrics	Lead vocal(s)	Length
1.	"Any Other Way"	Ro	Ro	3:47
2.	"Eustace St"	Kieran	Kieran	3:02
3.	"Stop"	Kieran	Kieran	3:44
4.	"Do You Realise"	Ro and Ross	Ro and Ross	3:18
5.	"Hands Off The Boy"	Kieran	Kieran	3:05
6.	"Leave It On"	Ro	Ro	2:18
7.	"Eyes Open"	Ro	Ro	4:54
8.	"Basis Of Everything"	Kieran, Ross, and Níal	Kieran and Ro	2:41
9.	"Waiting"	Kieran	Kieran	3:19
10.	"The Rules"	Kieran	Kieran	2:55
11.	"Until The Next Time"	Ro and Ross	Ro and Ross	3:58
12.	"Idle Conversation"	Ro and Ross	Ro and Ross	2:57
Total length:				41m 8s

== Sales and chart performance ==
By 20 July, exactly three months after its release, the album had sold 5,000 copies and reached #7 in the Irish Albums Chart. It reached Gold status (7,500) by the Start of December, with the band announcing this at their sold out Ambassador show. It has since passed the 10,000 mark.

Chart	Peak position
Irish Albums Chart	7
