= List of top 10 singles in 2007 (Ireland) =

This is a list of singles that peaked in the Top 10 of the Irish Singles Chart during 2007 (see 2007 in Irish music).

- The "Top 10 Entry Date" is when the song entered the Top 10 for the first time.
- Songs that were still in the Top 10 at the beginning of 2007 but peaked in 2006 are provided in the 2006 Peaks segment at the bottom of the page.

== Top 10 singles ==
Top ten entry date	Single	Artist	Peak	Peak date	Weeks in top ten
Singles from 2006
7 September	"Chasing Cars"^{[A]}	Snow Patrol	6	11 January	3
Singles from 2007
4 January	"Window in the Skies"	U2	5	11 January	4
11 January	"Proper Education"	Eric Prydz Vs. Pink Floyd	9	11 January	1
18 January	"Starz in Their Eyes"	Just Jack	2	25 January	7
18 January	"Too Little Too Late"	JoJo	2	22 February	7
18 January	"Grace Kelly"	Mika	1	1 February	13
18 January	"Night of My Life"	Damien Leith	8	25 January	3
1 February	"This Ain't a Scene, It's an Arms Race"^{[B]}	Fall Out Boy	5	8 February	5
8 February	"A Public Affair"	Jessica Simpson	9	8 February	2
8 February	"Pac's Life"	2Pac featuring Ashanti & T.I.	9	15 February	2
15 February	"I Wanna Love You"	Akon featuring Snoop Dogg	2	15 February	5
15 February	"Ruby"	Kaiser Chiefs	5	22 February	9
22 February	"Listen"	Beyoncé	6	22 February	3
22 February	"Lil Star"	Kelis featuring CeeLo Green	8	22 February	1
22 February	"How to Save a Life"	The Fray	1	29 March	11
1 March	"Shine"	Take That	2	1 March	5
1 March	"The Sweet Escape"	Gwen Stefani featuring Akon	4	22 March	9
1 March	"Miracle"^{[C]}	Cascada	4	15 March	4
8 March	"What Goes Around... Comes Around"	Justin Timberlake	6	8 March	3
15 March	"Give Me a Minute"	21 Demands	1	22 March	2
15 March	"Holiday"	Scuba Dice	8	15 March	1
22 March	"Destination Calabria"	Alex Gaudino featuring Crystal Waters	2	29 March	10
22 March	"Don't Look Back in Anger"	David O'Connor	7	22 March	1
22 March	"Glamorous"	Fergie featuring Ludacris	3	12 April	10
29 March	"Girlfriend"	Avril Lavigne	1	5 April	14
29 March	"I'm Gonna Be (500 Miles)"	The Proclaimers featuring Brian Potter & Andy Pipkin	7	12 April	3
5 April	"On Borrowed Wings"	David O'Connor	3	5 April	1
5 April	"Why?"	Greg Ryan	5	5 April	1
12 April	"Give It to Me"	Timbaland featuring Nelly Furtado & Justin Timberlake	2	10 May	13
12 April	"Last Night"	P. Diddy featuring Keyshia Cole	9	19 April	2
19 April	"Beautiful Liar"	Beyoncé & Shakira	1	19 April	8
19 April	"Brianstorm"	Arctic Monkeys	7	19 April	1
19 April	"Because of You"^{[D]}^{[E]}	Ne-Yo	9	7 June	4
26 April	"Like Only a Woman Can"	Brian McFadden	1	26 April	4
26 April	"I Wanna Have Your Babies"	Natasha Bedingfield	8	3 May	3
3 May	"Your Love Alone Is Not Enough"	Manic Street Preachers	7	3 May	1
10 May	"Don't Matter"	Akon	1	17 May	11
10 May	"Cupid's Chokehold"	Gym Class Heroes featuring Patrick Stump	3	31 May	8
17 May	"Signal Fire"	Snow Patrol	2	17 May	9
17 May	"Umbrella"	Rihanna featuring Jay Z	1	24 May	14
24 May	"Here (In Your Arms)"	Hellogoodbye	2	14 June	11
31 May	"Let's Dance"^{[F]}	Stellarsound featuring Paula Flynn	5	14 June	3
31 May	"Makes Me Wonder"	Maroon 5	10	31 May	2
14 June	"Do You Know? (The Ping Pong Song)"	Enrique Iglesias	2	28 June	10
14 June	"Like This"	Kelly Rowland featuring Eve	5	28 June	6
28 June	"Big Girls Don't Cry"	Fergie	1	19 July	13
5 July	"When You're Gone"	Avril Lavigne	4	5 July	6
5 July	"The Way I Are"	Timbaland featuring Keri Hilson & D.O.E.	1	26 July	16
12 July	"Teenagers"	My Chemical Romance	7	19 July	4
19 July	"Do It Again"	The Chemical Brothers	10	19 July	1
26 July	"Here Comes the Sun"	Aslan	5	26 July	1
26 July	"Don't Stop Believin'"^{[N]}	Journey	4	9 August	15
26 July	"Shut Up and Drive	Rihanna	5	30 August	10
2 August	"What Time Is It?"	The Cast of High School Musical 2	10	2 August	1
9 August	"Spider Pig"	Hans Zimmer	3	9 August	3
9 August	"Stronger"	Kanye West	2	16 August	10
9 August	"Big Girl (You Are Beautiful)"^{[G]}	Mika	9	16 August	3
16 August	"Hey There Delilah"	Plain White T's	2	30 August	13
23 August	"Clothes Off!!"	Gym Class Heroes	7	23 August	3
23 August	"Beautiful Girls"	Sean Kingston	1	30 August	10
23 August	"Ayo Technology"	50 Cent featuring Timbaland & Justin Timberlake	3	20 September	10
6 September	"1973"	James Blunt	5	6 September	6
13 September	"Nessun Dorma"^{[H]}	Luciano Pavarotti	7	13 September	1
20 September	"Sorry, Blame It on Me"^{[I]}	Akon	9	8 November	3
27 September	"If That's OK With You"	Shayne Ward	1	27 September	9
27 September	"About You Now"^{[K]}	Sugababes	2	11 October	10
4 October	"Let Me Think About It"	Ida Corr Vs. Fedde le Grand	8	11 October	3
18 October	"Valerie"	Mark Ronson featuring Amy Winehouse	3	18 October	8
18 October	"Gimme More"	Britney Spears	2	25 October	7
25 October	"Bleeding Love"	Leona Lewis	1	25 October	12
25 October	"Rule the World"^{[M]}	Take That	3	25 October	10
25 October	"Apologize"	Timbaland featuring OneRepublic	2	22 November	14
1 November	"Home"	Westlife	2	1 November	9
15 November	"No One"	Alicia Keys	8	29 November	4
22 November	"Breathless"	Shayne Ward	2	29 November	7
29 November	"Me Love"	Sean Kingston	7	29 November	2
29 November	"Call the Shots"	Girls Aloud	9	29 November	1
6 December	"Fairytale of New York"^{[J]}	The Pogues (featuring Kirsty MacColl)	3	20 December	4
13 December	"What Hurts the Most"	Cascada	6	13 December	4
13 December	"The Safe Cross Code"	Brendan Grace	6	20 December	2
13 December	"All I Want for Christmas Is You"^{[L]}	Mariah Carey	8	13 December	2
20 December	"When You Believe"	Leon Jackson	1	20 December	6

Notes

- ^{[A]} - The single re-entered the top 10 on 4 January 2007.
- ^{[B]} - The single re-entered the top 10 on 8 March 2007.
- ^{[C]} - The single re-entered the top 10 on 29 March 2007.
- ^{[D]} - The single re-entered the top 10 on 3 May 2007.
- ^{[E]} - The single re-entered the top 10 on 7 June 2007.
- ^{[F]} - The single re-entered the top 10 on 14 June 2007.
- ^{[G]} - The single re-entered the top 10 on 30 August 2007.
- ^{[H]} - The single peaked at #4 in 1990.
- ^{[I]} - The single re-entered the top 10 on 8 November 2007.
- ^{[J]} - The single peaked at #1 in 1987.
- ^{[K]} - The single re-entered the top 10 on 6 December 2007.
- ^{[L]} - The single peaked at #3 in 1994.
- ^{[M]} - The single re-entered the top 10 on 27 December 2007.
- ^{[N]} - The single re-entered the top 10 on 3 January 2008.

== See also ==
- 2007 in Irish music
- List of number-one singles of 2007 (Ireland)
