= Love Punch (disambiguation) =

Love Punch is an album by Ai Otsuka.

Love Punch or The Love Punch may also refer to:

- "Love Punch", a song by The Chalets from the album Check In
- 愛の一撃 "Love Punch", a song by Masaharu Fukuyama from Zankyō, and the compilation album The Best Bang!!
- The Love Punch, a 2013 film
- The Love Punch, a 1921 short from Felix the Cat filmography
