= Garden Party (festival) =

- Garden Party 2007
- Genre: Rock, Dance
- Dates: Saturday 9 June
- Locations: Ballinlough Castle, Athboy, County Meath, Ireland
- Years active: 2006 – 2007
- Website: WWW.GARDENPARTY.IE

The Garden Party was an annual Irish music festival, held for two years in 2006 and 2007 at Ballinlough Castle in Athboy, County Meath. Both events took place over one day in June. The festival was promoted by Pod Concerts & Bodytonic Music. Stages included the Main Stage, the Ambient Lounge, Pogo Tent, The Pond, Second Nature, Holistic Haven, The Rose Garden and Enchanted Playground.

== 2006 festival ==
The 2006 event was a one-day affair which took place at Ballinlough Castle in Athboy, County Meath on Sunday 4 June. Among the acts to play were The Orb, 2 Many DJs, Buck 65, Asian Dub Foundation and Neosupervital.

== 2007 festival ==
The 2007 event was also a one-day affair and took place again at Ballinlough Castle in Athboy, County Meath on Saturday 9 June from 2 p.m. until 2 a.m. It was headlined by Pet Shop Boys, Burning Spear, Carl Cox and Hot Chip.

The festival took place in high temperatures with Vitalic arriving 45 minutes late due to a delayed flight but eventually making an appearance on the Main Stage.

The 2007 festival was a resounding success and the organisers immediately announced its return in 2008. Organiser John Reynolds said: "This is the second year and like everything it takes two or three years for a festival to find its feet but if all goes well, it'll be an annual event from now on." However, the festival has now been confirmed by Bodytonic not to be taking place in 2008.
