= You Can Make Sound =

Studio album by Delorentos

Studio album by Delorentos
- Released: 9 October 2009 (Ireland)
- Genre: Alternative rock, indie
- Label: DeloRecords

Delorentos chronology
In Love with Detail (2007)	You Can Make Sound (2009)	Little Sparks (2012)

You Can Make Sound is the second studio album by Delorentos released on 9 October 2009. It reached #2 in the Irish Singles Chart and subsequently won the Entertainment.ie album of the Year 2009. The album was released in territories in Europe in March 2010.

== Album information ==
Composed in 6 months at the end of 2008, the album was recorded after singer and guitarist Ronan Yourell had decided to quit the band. The album was originally meant to be a mini album or EP. During the recording process the band decided not to split up, and wrote a final track together, "I Remember", to complete the track list. The album was again recorded with Gareth Mannix in Sun studios, in two weeks between March and April 2009.

In May, to support the release and tour, the title track "You Can Make Sound" was released as a free download. The next release was the single "Secret" in October 2009. It became the biggest hit by the band so far, receiving the largest radio play at home and abroad. The video was made by Dublin video director Eoghan Kidney.

The song "Hallucinatons" featured in a TV advert for "Steorn Industries" worldwide and led to Hallucinations being released as a single in the USA.

The final single, "Sanctuary" was released in November 2010. The accompanying video was the band's most ambitious to date, and earned them a nomination for "Best Band" at the IMTV (Irish Music TV) awards that month.

== Critical reception ==
The reception to the album was very good, with it receiving 4 stars out of five in Hot Press, The Sunday Tribune, and The Sunday Business Post and various other Irish papers. Due to the rushed nature of the release it was not reviewed as widely in Ireland as their previous Album. Outside Ireland the reviews were even better, with numerous very positive reviews in UK, Dutch, Spanish and German publications.

== Track listing ==
All tracks are written by Delorentos

No.	Title	Length
1.	"Sanctuary"
2.	"Secret"
3.	"Hallucinations"
4.	"You Say You'll Never Love Her"
5.	"Leave Me Alone"
6.	"Body Cold"
7.	"Editorial"
8.	"Let the Light Go Out"
9.	"Soulmate"
10.	"You Can Make Sound"
11.	"I Remember"

== Sales and chart performance ==
On its first week it reached number 2 in the Irish Charts.

Chart	Peak position
Irish Albums Chart	2
