= Pony Club (band) =

Irish band

- Also known as: Bawl; Fixed Stars
- Origin: Dublin, Ireland
- Years active: 2001·present
- Label: Hum
- Members: Mark Cullen; Darren Cullen; Jason Cullen; Martin Healy; David Morrissey; Rob Cumiskey

Pony Club are a Dublin-based Irish band, primarily a vehicle for Mark Cullen. Other members include his brothers, Darren and Jason, as well as Martin Healy and David Morrissey, both formerly of A House, and Rob Cumiskey of The Kybosh.

== History ==
=== Bawl and Fixed Stars ===
Cullen and his brothers moved from Finglas, Dublin to London in the 1990s after having signed to A&M under their then moniker, Bawl (which also featured Stephen McBride on bass). Bawl had released a series of singles on their own label, Dependent Records, and in 1996 released an album, Year Zero on A&M. This attracted critical attention and some "the new Smiths" hype (the Cullens cited their mother singing Some Girls Are Bigger Than Others at the kitchen sink as an influence) but disappointing sales. For legal reasons, the band had to change its name to Fixed Stars and signed on with Mercury. They released several singles as Fixed Stars, but broke up in 2000, having been dropped before releasing their album.

Ian Broudie of the Lightning Seeds had produced some of the Fixed Stars singles, and Mark Cullen continued to work with Broudie, writing songs for the Lightning Seeds album Tilt, and contributing with Broudie to the soundtrack of Purely Belter. Cullen and Broudie continue to collaborate on "songs for other people", and Cullen has written for Kylie Minogue.

=== Pony Club ===
After the post-Fixed Stars transition period, Cullen then signed as a solo artist, under the name Pony Club, to Setanta Records, natural home for many Irish indie acts. As Pony Club, Cullen works with a variety of musicians, still including his brothers, and, recently, Martin Healy and David Morrissey, of Setanta labelmates A House (John Carrol, A House's manager, had also managed Bawl) and Rob Cumiskey of Dublin band, The Kybosh.

So far, Pony Club have released three albums, the first two on Setanta. Home Truths (Allmusic review: 3.5/5 link) was named album of the year for 2002 by Dan Cairns of the Sunday Times, and resulted in Cullen being offered a support slot on Morrissey's American tour. For financial reasons, the band were unable to take up this offer, but they did get to support him at his concert at London's Royal Albert Hall that year. The second is Family Business (Allmusic review: 4/5 link) from 2004.

Following the demise of Setanta, the third Pony Club album, Post Romantic, was released in November 2008 by Hum records.

Cullen has been called one of Ireland's top songwriters of the last decade. He receives particular attention from critics for the quality of his lyrics, which are often compared to those of Jarvis Cocker for their power of observation and acerbity, as well as tributes for his songwriting from artists such as Morrissey and Terry Hall.

The London band New Young Pony Club called themselves "New Young" to distinguish themselves from Pony Club. In response, Cullen has joked that he is happy to be known as the Old Decrepit Pony Club if needs must.

== Discography ==
=== Pony Club singles and albums ===
Single	Album	Year	Label
	Home Truths	2002	Setanta
	Family Business	2004	Setanta
	Post Romantic	2008	Hum
"Diplomat"		2009	Hum

=== Bawl singles and albums ===
Single	Album	Year	Label
"Bathroom"		1995	Dependent Records
"Girls Night Out"		1996	Dependent Records
"Glen Campbell Nights"		1996	Dependent Records
"Beyond Safe Ways"		1996	Dependent Records
"Sticky Rock"		1996	Dependent Records
	Year Zero	1996	Dependent Records, A&M Records
"He’s All That’s Great About Pop"		1997	Dependent Records

=== Fixed Stars singles ===
Single	Year	Label
"Blueprints"	1999	Mercury
"Every Night"	1999	Mercury
"Here Comes the Music"	1999	Mercury
"What If the World Sleeps with You?"	2000	Mercury
