= Daithí Ó Drónaí =

Irish musician and producer (born 1990)

- Born: 16 March 1990 (age 36)
- Origin: Ballyvaughan, County Clare, Ireland
- Genres: Electronic, house
- Occupation: Musician
- Instruments: Guitar, bass guitar, fiddle
- Label: Independent
- Website: www.daithi.ie

Daithí Ó Drónaí (born 16 March 1990) is an Irish musician and producer, best known for producing electronic music inspired by Irish culture under the artist name "Daithí". He debuted in 2009 as a participant on All Ireland Talent Show. Since then, Daithí has developed a successful music career in Ireland, releasing an album with Sony Music Entertainment and independently releasing a range of E.P.s. Two of his singles, "Chameleon Life" and "Mary Keanes Introduction" were nominated for the Choice Music Prize.

Daithí is well known for his unique approach to live electronic music. His live performances are House music based, and use Synthesizers, the computer program Ableton Live and a synthesised Fiddle. The performance is improvised, with each "track" being broken up into small loops and mixed together differently at each show. His live show has been toured around Europe, and is a mainstay at festivals in Ireland. Daithí has supported international acts such as Disclosure (band), DJ Shadow, The xx, Santigold, Macklemore and Duke Dumont.

In 2015, Daithí released a single called "Mary Keanes Introduction" a track which went viral in Ireland. The track featured Daithí's 90-year-old grandmother at the start of the track, talking about how she met her husband. The track stayed at no1 in the Spotify Irish viral charts for 6 weeks, was featured in NME and received extensive radio play in Ireland. The track was considered the beginning of a change of direction for Daithí, moving from pop music to Electronic dance music inspired by Irish culture and the west of Ireland.

== Early life ==
Ó Drónaí was taught the traditional fiddle by his family whilst growing up in Ballyvaughan, County Clare. His Family, the Droney family, has a strong tradition of Traditional Irish music; his Grandfather is a well known concertina player, Chris Droney . In his teenage years, he progressed to playing the bass guitar for local bands in North.

Daithí attended boarding school Rockwell College in County Tipperary. While he didn't particularly enjoy the sports focused school, it was here that he learned how to write music.

"I went through a hibernation period of two years just doing study, school and music. That's where I learned how to write songs. I hated boarding school, but while I was there, I learned how to write music so it wasn't all bad."

Daithí went to university at Acadamh na hOllscolaíochta Gaeilge, studying Journalism and the Media. While in his first year in College he began experimenting with the fiddle and a loop station, a type of Guitar pedal that loops sounds on top of each other. During his first year at college, Ó Dronaí auditioned for the first series of The All Ireland Talent Show. Using the loop station and the fiddle, He was selected to represent the West and was mentored by namesake Dáithí Ó Sé., and went on to perform in the Final of the show. A year later Daithí appeared in the audition phases of Sky 1's Must Be The Music, gaining three yes votes from the judges. He later was chosen as one of the 15 Semi-finalists, and his tracks became available to download on Sky Music. He became the first of two acts to reach the final of the show, and his track "Carraroe" reached number 6 in the UK Indie singles chart on the same night. The final of the show took place in Wembley Arena, where Daithí performed to a 10,000 capacity crowd.

== Embrace (E.P.) (2011) ==
Embrace was Daithí's first official music release. The E.P was recorded in Galway at the Forge Studios in Galway, and produced by David Phelan. The EP is focused on looped live fiddle over strong percussive beats.

The lead single Sleep Like A Stone was premiered on Nialler9, and featured a video from Feel Good Lost. The video was the first music video produced by Feel good Lost, who went on to produce the video for Hozier's Take Me to Church.

Following the release of the EP, Daithí began playing live shows across the country, including his first performances at Electric Picnic, Body & Soul Music Festival, and Castle Palooza.

== In Flight (Album) (2014) ==
At the start of 2012 Daithí was approached by Sony Music Ireland, and signed a development and record deal with the company. Daithí began working with David Kitt, learning song writing and structure. He then went on to work with Ian Ring, a producer from Cork band Young Wonder. Ian began teaching Daithí production skills, and the pair went on to record several songs for Daithí's debut album. During the process, Daithí developed an interest in pop music, which became the focus for In Flight.

"I started working on the idea of making tunes which would sound amazing on radio. Myself and Ian even made up these rules: three minutes or under, get to the chorus as fast as possible, a tiny intro. Certain chord structures work really well on the radio. When we started writing, we came up with these amazing songs."

The album was well received in Ireland and the Uk. The Irish Times gave the album 4 stars in their review, and said "It's one radio-friendly, dancefloor-teasing nugget after another, an album of superbly sculpted tracks each primed to catch the ear."

Talking about the lead single Chameleon life, The Guardian said the track "has a sophistication that sets it apart from the tsunami of identikit EDM bangers that are out there, riding a wave of euphoria that barely lets up throughout its three and a half minutes.". Chameleon Life went on to be nominated for a choice music prize. Pigeons and Planes stated that the second single Case Closed "is the sort of soulful deep-house that could either capture a dancefloor late in the throes of the night or soundtrack more personal (albeit beat-driven) moments, intelligent house music that employs pop structure and good writing (usual themes of love, relationships gone wrong, and striving on through it all abound) to complement a warm groove."

== Tribes E.P. (2016) ==
Following the release of In Flight, Daithí parted ways with Sony music to pursue a change of direction. Moving from Pop production, Daithí wanted to write music more focused on Irish culture and the west of Ireland.

"I recorded an album two years ago which was a real pop album so when I went back into writing again I decided I wanted to work on something a bit more personal and take a bit more influence and inspiration from around where I am. It felt like a really good time to use this inspiration and explore what it like to live in Galway and Clare for so long."

The E.P was very well received in Ireland. The first single Mary Keanes Introduction went viral, and charted at no1 on the Spotify Viral charts for 6 weeks. The track was nominated for a choice music prize. State.ie said "Love's on top", the second single featuring Sinead White, was "A force of emotive, charming composition, White's soaring tones pair wonderfully atop Daithí's unique spin on electronica."
