= Aiken Promotions =

Irish music promoter

- Industry: Entertainment
- Headquarters: Ireland
- Website: aikenpromotions.com

Aiken Promotions is a music promoter operating in Ireland. It is a former co-organiser of the annual Electric Picnic festival at Stradbally, County Laois, and also organises the Live at the Marquee event in Cork. Founded by Jim Aiken, the company has been seminal in bringing international acts to Ireland from the 1960s to the present day. Aiken was particularly successful in encouraging artists to perform in Ireland during The Troubles.

== History ==
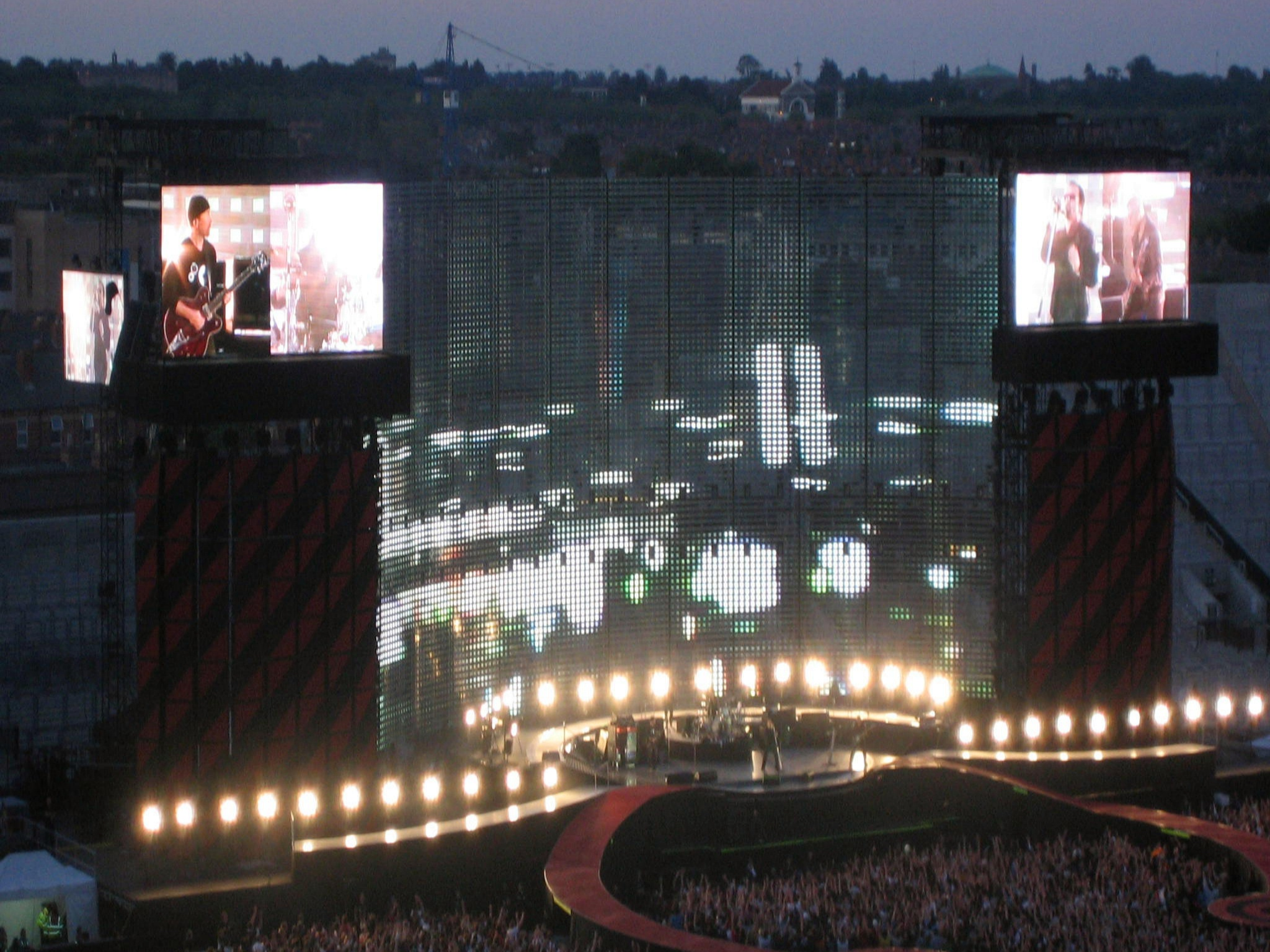
Aiken was instrumental in having the Gaelic Athletic Association open up Croke Park to rock bands such as U2 (seen here performing in the stadium as part of their Vertigo Tour in 2005).

Jim Aiken invited numerous international artists to Ireland from the 1960s until his death, in the process of which he developed working relationships with musicians such as Johnny Cash, Bob Dylan, Elton John, Tom Jones, Cliff Richard, Luciano Pavarotti, Bruce Springsteen and Simon and Garfunkel. He vacated a teaching post in 1965 when he began to find success promoting music.

Aiken was also innovative in persuading the Gaelic Athletic Association to open up Croke Park in Dublin as a music venue, with Aiken organising the first ever shows at the venue by U2 in 1985. U2 still use the venue for performances in the city today, with the latest taking place in July 2009 as part of their U2 360° Tour.

Aiken also promoted shows at Stormont Castle in Belfast, as well as the regular Slane Concert events in County Meath in the 1980s, featuring artists such as The Rolling Stones, Bob Dylan, Bruce Springsteen, David Bowie and Queen, before his death in February 2007. Gilbert O'Sullivan performed under the company's banner in the 1970s. When Westlife perform in Belfast they are advertised by Aiken Promotions.

== Recent events ==
=== Electric Picnic ===
Aiken Promotions previously organised the Electric Picnic festival alongside Pod Concerts. The British promoter Festival Republic bought out the share of Aiken Promotions in Electric Picnic in March 2009, joining in a partnership with Pod Concerts to organise the 2009 event.

=== Live at the Marquee ===
Aiken Promotions have been promoting their annual Live at the Marquee event in Cork since 2005. The company has attracted artists such as Simple Minds, Crosby, Stills & Nash, Rod Stewart, The Prodigy, Kasabian and Josh Ritter for the 2009 event, whilst Christy Moore performs there on a regular basis. In addition, the company held similar tented shows in Phoenix Park, Dublin, in 2007, whilst the Point Theatre (now the O_{2}) was unavailable due to renovations. Shows were performed there by artists such as Kanye West and Cascada.
