= Róisín Dubh (music venue) =

Music venue in Galway, Ireland

Coordinates: 53.27023°N 9.05820°W

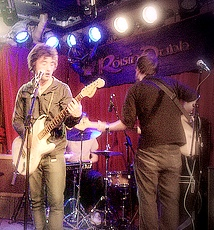
Jape performing at the Róisín Dubh.

The Róisín Dubh is a live music and comedy venue located in Galway, Ireland. It has hosted events such as the IMRO Showcase Tour and the 2fm 2moro 2our. The name translates from the Irish language as the "little black rose". According to Una Mullally in the Sunday Tribune, the venue is "the heart of live music in the city".

== Live broadcasts ==
In 2018 the radio host Paul McLoone broadcast a series of shows on his Today FM national program, The Paul Mclone Show. The first stop on the national tour was the Roisin Dubh in Galway.

In 2008 the Róisín won the IMRO award for Best Venue in Connacht and was nominated for Best Venue In Ireland. It won the Regional Award for Connacht again in 2009.

Nial Conlon of Dublin-based band Delorentos praised the venue's owner, Gugai, for welcoming the band when no other venue would. Other notable fans who attend the venue include broadcaster Síle Ní Bhraonain.
