= Hybrasil =

Irish underground electronica group

- Origin: Wicklow, Ireland
- Genres: Indie, underground, electronica
- Years active: 2004–2010
- Labels: Manazo Records
- Members: Spud Murphy Keith Byrne; Neil Horner Joe Kavanagh
- Past members: Nipper Kinsella
- Website: hybrasil.com

Hybrasil are an Irish underground electronica group that formed in the seaside town of Wicklow, Ireland in 2004. The band are named after Brasil, a phantom island featured in many Irish myths. They have released two EP's to date and their debut album, The Monkey Pole, was released in September, 2007.

== History ==
=== Early Years (2004-2007) ===
The group built a homemade recording studio and spent six months working on demos which they would pass out to their friends. In 2005 they were selected to perform at the IMRO Showcase, Bud Rising and the Hard Working Class Heroes Festival. A number of high-profile gigs also followed, supporting acts such as Republic Of Loose, Idlewild and The Chalets, whilst they also opened for legendary Liverpool act The La's, for their first gig in over a decade.

Hybrasil's debut EP We Got Music, was released nationally in September 2005 and debuted at #43 in the Irish charts despite receiving only a limited release. The single attracted the band prominent admirers in Ireland, such as 2FM’s Dan Hegarty and Larry Gogan as well as a host of regional radio stations such as Beat 102-103, Limerick Live and Red FM. Today FM’s Tom Dunne also chose the song as his ‘Single of the Week’ for his show Pet Sounds. It also received a limited release in Great Britain, Germany and Japan in February 2006, and following this the band went on a national tour of the UK with The Frank And Walters and Les Carter’s latest musical project; IDOU. We Got Music debuted at #29 on the College Airplay charts and was supported by a host of DJ's, including Clint Boon, Laurence Guest and Linda Serck.

Hybrasil released their follow-up EP, When I’m Yawning, in August, 2006. It an accompanying music video which continues to receive airplay on Irish television. They also embarked on their most extensive tour of Ireland to date, in addition to adding a handful of dates in the UK. The band made its live television debut later that year, whilst appearing on RTÉ’s Tubridy Tonight Show in September.

=== The Monkey Pole (2007 – 2010) ===
The band returned to the studio in the early 2007 to put the finishing touches on their debut album but took a break from recording when they were handpicked by Mike Scott to open for The Waterboys on their Irish tour. Their next single, God Bless The Devil, was released on 22 June and A-listed on over a dozen stations in Ireland with 2FM’s, Dan Hegarty describing it as ‘my favourite single at the moment’ and the single was the most popular release on Dublin's Phantom FM. Their critically acclaimed debut album, The Monkey Pole, was released nationally in September and the band spent the rest of the year touring the country. Dan Hegarty would later select "The Monkey Pole" as an album he regarded as Buried Treasure

In January 2008, Nipper Kinsella parted company under amicable circumstances and the rest of the band made the decision to continue as a four-piece.

In 2009 the band entered a quiet period. Some of the band members got involved with other musical projects such as Moon. Hybrasil broke up in 2010.

== Discography ==
=== Studio albums ===
- The Monkey Pole (2007)

=== Singles ===
- God Bless The Devil (2007)
- When I'm Yawning EP (2006)
- We Got Music EP (2005)

== Band members ==
- Spud Murphy (lead guitar, vocals, samplers, synths, and percussion)
- Keith Byrne (bass guitar, backing vocals and percussion)
- Neil Horner (drums)
- Joe Kavanagh (synths, backing vocals and percussion)

== Associated Bands ==
Battery Acid, Birds of Olympus, Curiosity Kitten, Daydream Regime, East Coast Coolers, Inverted Youth, Label, Moon, Obi Wan, Sack, Subaquadelic

== See also ==
- Music of Ireland
- Irish rock
- List of indie rock musicians
