= Do You Realise =

2007 EP by rock band Delorentos

EP by Delorentos
- Released: 9 November 2007 (Ireland)
- Genre: Alternative rock, indie
- Label: Delo Records/Cottage Records

Delorentos chronology
In Love with Detail (2007)	Do You Realise (2007)	You Can Make Sound (2009)

Do You Realise was the second EP released by the Dublin-based Irish indie–alternative rock band, Delorentos. It was released on 9 November 2007, spending two weeks in the Irish Singles Chart and peaking at #34. The EP contained the tracks "Do You Realise", "Neon (Extended)", "All This Time" and "Circumstance and Chance". New versions of "Neon" and "All This Time" were recorded for the EP during the In Love with Detail sessions, whilst "Circumstance and Chance" was recorded in 2006 with Marc Carolan at an early album demo session in Grouse Lodge in County Westmeath.

== Track listing ==
All tracks are written by Delorentos.

No.	Title	Length
1.	"Do You Realise (radio edit)"
2.	"Neon (extended version)"
3.	"All This Time"
4.	"Circumstance and Chance"

== Chart performance ==
Chart	Peak position
Irish Singles Chart	34
