= Achieving Vagueness =

Studio album by The Flaws
- Released: September 14, 2007
- Recorded: 2006–2007
- Genre: Indie rock
- Length: 38:08
- Label: Polydor
- Producer: Gareth Mannix

The Flaws chronology
Achieving Vagueness (2007)	Constant Adventure (2010)

Professional ratings
Review scores
Source	Rating
AllMusic	4/5 stars
The Irish Times	4/5 stars
Irish Independent	4/5 stars
Entertainment.ie	3/5 stars
Metro	5/5 stars

Achieving Vagueness (#18 Irish Charts) is the title of The Flaws' debut album. It was released on September 14, 2007. The album was originally to be titled Lost in a Scene. It was nominated for the Choice Music Prize for Irish Album of the Year 2007.

== Track listing ==
1. "You & I" – 3:28
2. "No Room" – 2:52
3. "1981" – 3:12
4. "Lost in a Scene" – 3:03
5. "Slow Dance" – 5:23
6. "Sixteen" – 3:58
7. "Idolise" – 3:05
8. "Out Tonight" – 3:06
9. "Throwaway" – 5:20
10. "Windmill Talent" – 5:34

== Singles ==
1. "Sixteen" b/w "Punk" (2007) (#29 Irish Charts)
2. "1981" b/w "Lost in a Scene" (2007)
3. "You & I" (Download Only) (2007)
