= Leave It On =

EP by Delorentos
- Released: November 2005 (Ireland)
- Recorded: Over the summer of 2005.
- Genre: Alternative rock, indie
- Label: Delo Records/Cottage Records

Delorentos chronology
Leave It On (2005)	In Love with Detail (2007)

Leave It On was the debut EP released by the Dublin-based Irish indie–alternative rock band, Delorentos. The EP was recorded in Pulse Studios over the summer of 2005 with local producer, Marc Carolan. Carolan had previously worked with bands such as Muse, The Cure and JJ72. The record was mixed in Carolan's own Suite Studio, with artwork being designed by Kevin Lynch. The track listing was "Leave It on", "Any Other Way", "Solitude", and "If she never comes around again". It was chosen as Single of the Fortnight by "Hotpress" Magazine in Ireland.

== Background ==
Leave It On, was an entirely independent release and was launched in Whelan's in Dublin. The band gathered some cash together to record it at the start of the year. McGuinness had a job so provided much of the money, with the rest of the band paying him back. Leave It On was released on the band's Delo Records label, with Cottage Records distributing it. Produced by Marc Carolan the four-track EP was released in Ireland in November 2005, entering the Top 30 of the Irish Singles Chart.

== Chart performance ==
Chart	Peak position
Irish Singles Chart	24
