= The Flaws =

Background information
- Origin: Carrickmacross, County Monaghan, Ireland
- Genres: Indie-Rock
- Years active: 2004 – 2016
- Labels: Polydor UK, SFR, Arrivals Records
- Members: Paul Finn; Shane Malone; Paul Mallon
- Past members: Stephen Finnegan; Colin Berrill; Dane McMahon

The Flaws were an Irish indie-rock quartet from Carrickmacross in County Monaghan. The band released their self entitled debut EP in mid-2005 which culminated in the signing of a five-album contract to Polydor UK/Universal Music in December 2005. The group released three full-length studio albums between 2007 and 2016.

== Career ==
=== Background ===
The original group of Paul Finn, Stephen Finnegan, Shane Malone and Dane McMahon went to the Patrician High School secondary school together in Carrickmacross and formed a band in the early 2000s called "Sweet Relief" during their Dublin college years. Finn and Finnegan had been primary school friends prior to meeting Malone and McMahon. A more serious approach to original music culminated in a band name change and the recruiting of Derek Turner of Tumbleweed Studios. Extensive touring in Irish original music venues ensured a sound foundation for the quartet in those early years. Venues such as the Spirit Store, McHughs Drogheda, Eamon Doran’s, Cypress Avenue, Dolan’s, Auntie Annies, McGarrigles, Voodoo Lounge, Yukon Bar, An Roisin Dubh were frequented as the band shaped their musical niche.

The Flaws embarked on a tour during the Summer of 2005 around Ireland with Dublin band Delorentos and Belfast indie outfit Fast Emperors. Other support slots to The Fratellis and Editors helped bolster the bands growing popularity in the early days. In July 2007, original drummer, founding member Stephen Finnegan left the band for personal reasons.

=== Popularity ===
The Flaws played the Crawdaddy Stage of Electric Picnic on Sunday 2 September 2007. They did an instore in BPM in Wexford on Sunday 28 October. They played "Rock 'N Roulette" on The Podge and Rodge Show on Tuesday 20 November 2007. The Flaws were nominated in the "Best Irish Album" and "Best Irish Band" categories at the 2008 Meteor Awards. Their debut album, Achieving Vagueness, was also nominated for the Choice Music Prize. The list of 2008 festival appearances for the band includes a return to the Electric Picnic and slots at Glastonbury, Indie-pendence and Castlepalooza. The Flaws also had their music played on a number of radio stations and music channels in Italy.

== Discography ==
The Flaws's four-track EP was recorded in Tumbleweed Studios in Dundalk, County Louth. National commercial radio station Today FM Phantom 105.2 broadcast the track on Alison Curtis's The Last Splash programme, in which she described the lead track "16" as "brilliant". The EP also includes the tracks "Idolise", "Everybody's Got to be Somewhere" and "Fed to the Lions". Their debut album, Achieving Vagueness was released on 14 September 2007. A Choice Music Prize nomination for the album followed on 10 January 2008. Their debut album was recorded and mixed by Irish producer Gareth Mannix (Republic of Loose/Delorentos/Director).

October 2010 saw the release of the group's second album, Constant Adventure. The Flaws went on a hiatus for 2 years, infrequently releasing singles until they announced that they would release a third record. "Springtime For The Flaws", was released 24 April 2015.

The Flaws disbanded in 2016.

In May 2020, an unannounced song entitled “All Of Us” was released on social media with an accompanying video.

In January 2021, Paul Finn as SOMEFINN released a solo album entitled "...tsk, tsk..."

== Albums ==
- Achieving Vagueness, 2007
- Constant Adventure, 2010
- Springtime For The Flaws, 2015

== Singles ==
- No Room (March 2006)
- Out Tonight (June 2006)
- Sixteen (May 2007, IRE No. 29)
- 1981 (July 2007)
- You and I (November 2007)
- I Don't Wanna Dance (September 2009)
- Part of You (October 2010)
- Make Good (February 2011)
- Constant Adventure (June 2011)
- Million Miles (May 2012)
- Let's Fight (July 2012)
- Animals (September 2014)
- That's What You Get (February 2015)
