= High Horse Olympics =

EP by The Kinetiks
- Released: April 27, 2007
- Genre: Indie
- Length: 13:05
- Label: Rapture Records

The Kinetiks chronology
High Horse Olympics (2007)	Aye Aye Aye Aye EP (2009)

High Horse Olympics is an EP by The Kinetiks released on April 27, 2007 by Rapture Records. This was The Kinetiks debut EP. The song "Run Run Run" was featured in The Real World: Cancun episode entitled "Jerkface Joes and Romeos."

== Track listing ==
1. "A Smiled Crack Your Face" - 03:30
2. "Run Run Run" - 03:30
3. "I Try" - 02:56
4. "Cop Yourself On" - 03:09
