= Cois Fharraige (festival) =

Irish surfing and music festival

- Genre: Music festival with surfing elements
- Dates: 11–13 September
- Locations: Kilkee, County Clare, Ireland
- Coordinates: 52°40′44.57″N 9°38′24.12″W
- Years active: 2007; 2008; 2009
- Attendance: 2007: 20,000; 2008: 6,500-7,000; 2009: 3,000
- Organiser: MCD Productions
- Sponsor: Sony Ericsson
- Website: www.coisfharraige.com

Cois Fharraige was a three-day Irish surfing and music festival, held annually in Kilkee, County Clare from 2007 to 2009 during the first week of September. The name is derived from the Irish language phrase meaning "beside the sea". It was notable as Ireland's first surfing and music festival and was a joint project between MCD and Sony Ericsson.

In its inaugural year, 2007, Cois Fharraige was a commercial success, with a reported 20,000 attendees. Strong line-ups and the novelty of the surf-music concept helped sustain attendance through 2008. However, the 2009 edition saw a sharp decline in ticket sales, attributed to a late announcement and ongoing economic factors, and proved to be the final edition of the festival.

== 2007 festival ==
The 2007 event took place from 7–9 September in Kilkee, County Clare.

The first set of bands announced to play included Ocean Colour Scene, Fun Lovin' Criminals, Republic of Loose, The Blizzards, Kíla, Tom Baxter, Róisín Murphy and Buffalo Souljah. Within days, Badly Drawn Boy and The Enemy were added to the line-up.

The event ran on an invitation only basis, for surfers with a required standard of surfing. An invitation was issued from The West Coast Surf Club to all suitable applicants. The surf event offered 48 competitive places to applicants. However, on Friday 7 September organisers were forced to postpone the surfing elmenent of the festival as there was not suitable swell in the sea for surfing.

The 2007 edition of the festival drew 20,000 attendees. A Hot Press review of 2007 described it as "a pleasing weekend’s music, that made for an enjoyably relaxed comedown from the Electric Picnic".

=== 2007 line-up ===
The 2007 edition of the festival featured the following:

2007 Line‑up
Date	Start time	Line‑up
Friday, 7 September 2007	18:00hrs	Fun Lovin' Criminals; The Blizzards; Róisín Murphy; Majella Murphy
Saturday, 8 September 2007	16:00hrs	Paddy Casey; Ocean Colour Scene; Republic of Loose; The Enemy; 28 Costumes; The Kinetiks
Sunday, 9 September 2007	15:00hrs	Badly Drawn Boy; Kíla; Tom Baxter; Buffalo Souljah; Delorentos; Newton Faulkner
Strict curfew Friday & Saturday – 00:30hrs; Sunday – 23:30hrs

== 2008 festival ==
Cois Fharraige 2008 took place from 5–7 September in Kilkee. It was headlined by Travis, Supergrass and The Zutons. Also appearing were The Futureheads, Seasick Steve, The Coronas, Cathy Davey, Kíla, Starsailor, Ocean Colour Scene and 28 Costumes. Early Bird three-day festival tickets cost €79.50 until 11 August and after that prices rise to €89.50. Tickets went on sale at 09:00 on Friday 13 June. They had sold out by 28 August. There were no day tickets on sale in 2008. Travis's headlining set received an honourable mention on RTÉ's Gigs of 2008 list.

=== 2008 line-up ===
The line-up for 2008 was as follows:

Cois Fharraige 2008 – Kilkee, Co. Clare (5–7 September)
Date	Line‑up
Friday, 5 September 2008	The Zutons; The Futureheads; The Coronas; The Kanyu Tree
Saturday, 6 September 2008	Supergrass; Seasick Steve; Kíla; The Broken Family Band; 28 Costumes
Sunday, 7 September 2008	Travis; Starsailor; Natty; Simon and Oscar of Ocean Colour Scene; The Joe Brown Band

== 2009 festival ==
The 2009 edition of the festival was troubled even before it began. Taking place in the Post-2008 Irish economic downturn, by May 2009 there were major concerns the festival could not go ahead due to a lack of sponsorship after Sony Ericsson pulled out. However, in mid-June 2009 local businesses came to an agreement with MCD to fill the void left by Sony Ericsson in an attempt to save the festival.

The festival was not officially confirmed to be taking place until just weeks before it was due to be held.

Cois Fharraige 2009 took place from 11 to 13 September in Kilkee. On 13 May 2009, it was reported that MCD had applied for a licence to hold the festival. It featured acts such as Doves, The Zutons, Newton Faulkner, Noah and the Whale, The Hold Steady, Stereo MCs, The Lightning Seeds and Jerry Fish & The Mudbug Club. The Blizzards and Laura Izibor were later added.

Despite what was believed to be a strong lineup, 2009 only had 3,000 attendees, significantly down from years prior. Some of this was attributed to how late the festival had been officially confirmed as taking place.

2009 was the last year of Cois Fharraige.

=== 2009 lineup ===
Day	Line‑up
Friday, 11 September 2009	Doves; The Blizzards; Laura Izibor; Joe Echo
Saturday, 12 September 2009	The Saw Doctors; Newton Faulkner; Noah and the Whale; The Hold Steady; Jerry Fish and the Mudbug Club
Sunday, 13 September 2009	The Zutons; Stereo MCs; The Lightning Seeds; Jazzlite; Hallo I Love You
