= Jenny Lindfors =

- Also known as: Sailing Stones
- Born: Jenny Elin-Sofia Lindfors; Dublin, Ireland
- Genres: Rock/ pop, indie, folk
- Occupations: Singer/ songwriter, musician, vocalist, backing vocalist
- Instruments: Vocals, guitar, piano, keys
- Website: www.thisissailingstones.com

Jenny Lindfors, also known as the stage name Sailing Stones, is an Irish-Swedish singer-songwriter, vocalist, musician and composer. She self-produces her music under the moniker Sailing Stones.

The debut Sailing Stones album "Polymnia" was released in 2020, receiving regular airplay on 6Music and BBC Radio London. It received positive reviews and was described as "a contemporary classic" by Berlin-based magazine NBHAP.

Slow Magic was released on 3 July 2026 as the second studio album. Self-produced by Lindfors, with arrangements by composer Dan Moore, the twelve-track album explores the physical, emotional and psychological transformations of motherhood and matrescence, drawing on experiences following the birth of her daughter. Musically, it combines psychedelic folk, folk-pop, electronic textures and richly layered arrangements, with influences ranging from Pentangle and The Beach Boys to David Axelrod, The Electric Prunes and Jefferson Airplane. The album received widespread critical acclaim on release; The Irish Times awarded it four out of five stars, describing it as an insightful collection of “glistening folk-pop-psych”, while KLOF Mag called it “one of the most satisfyingly complete collections of songs” of the year. It was listed as one of Bandcamps New & Notable releases, and reviews from Americana UK and Fortitude Magazine similarly praised its emotional depth and richly textured sound. Under the Radar premiered the single “Days Come, Days Go”, highlighting its dreamy, intimate portrayal of motherhood. The album and its preceding singles also received radio support, including repeated BBC Radio 6 Music airplay.

Enough Is Enough/ Let Me Show You Love

In June 2026, Lindfors was identified as the vocalist on Avicii’s unreleased track “Enough Is Enough”, also known as “Let Me Show You Love”. Lindfors said she recorded the vocals in London in 2011 during a session arranged by producer Hal Ritson. Her original recording was subsequently used in the version of the song performed by Avicii, which became a popular unreleased track among fans and circulated through unofficial recordings. Lindfors’s identity had remained unknown for approximately 15 years, during which several other singers were speculated to have provided the vocals. The song has never received an official release, although NERVO have previously discussed attempts to release a version of it.

== Discography ==
=== Albums ===
- Polymnia (2020)
- Slow Magic (2026)

=== EPs ===
- She's A Rose (2018)

=== Singles ===
- "Days Come, Days Go" (2026)
- "The Colour Of The Sun" (2026)
- "A Promise To Love" (2026)
- "Polymnia" (2020)
- "Emmanuel" (2020)
- "Comfort" (2020)
- "Receive" (2020)
- "The Fire Escape" (2020)
- "Don't Tempt the Shadow" (2019)
- "Telescopes" (2017)
- "The Blazing Sun" (2017)
