= Check In =

Studio album by The Chalets
- Released: September 2, 2005
- Genre: Indie rock, indie pop, post-punk
- Length: 39:15
- Label: Setanta Records
- Producer: Richard Rainey, Gareth Mannix

Professional ratings
Review scores
Source	Rating
Robert Christgau	B+

Check In is the sole album by the Chalets, released in 2005.

== Track listing ==
1. "Theme from Chalets" – 2:55
2. "No Style" – 3:30
3. "Red High Heels" – 3:12
4. "Gogo Don't Go" – 3:27
5. "Arrivals" – 0:41
6. "Feel the Machine" – 3:13
7. "Two Chord Song" – 1:55
8. "Fight Your Kids" – 3:27
9. "Nightrocker" – 3:18
10. "Sexy Mistake" – 2:55
11. "Departures" – 0:42
12. "Checkout" – 2:41
13. "Love Punch" – 2:20
14. "Beach Blanket" – 4:59
