= We Thrive on Big Cities =

We Thrive On Big Cities

Studio album by Director
- Released: October 6, 2006 (ROI)
- Genre: Rock, Pop
- Length: 34:59
- Label: Atlantic
- Producer: Director

Director chronology
| We Thrive On Big Cities (2006) | I'll Wait for Sound (2009) |

We Thrive on Big Cities is the debut studio album by the Irish pop rock quartet, Director. It was released on October 6, 2006 in the Republic of Ireland.

It peaked at #2 on the Irish Albums Chart, and since its release, the album has gone multi-platinum in Ireland. It was nominated for the 2006 Choice Music Prize Irish Album of the Year. We Thrive on Big Cities had sold 22,000 copies in Ireland, as of 2007.

The song "Big Cities" was used in an internet trailer for Halo 3.

== Track listing ==
1. "Easy to Me" – 3:03
2. "Standing in My Way" – 2:52
3. "Reconnect" – 4:32
4. "I Only Realise" – 3:57
5. "She's Saying Things" – 4:25
6. "Leave It to Me" – 4:15
7. "Come with a Friend" – 3:34
8. "Big Cities" – 2:18
9. "Can You Take It" – 3:23
10. "Never Know" – 4:00
