= Solas Festival =

- Genre: Indie rock, folk
- Dates: Fourth weekend of June (3 days)
- Locations: Wiston, South Lanarkshire, Scotland, 2010-2012; The Bield, Blackruthven, Perthshire, 2013-2018; Errol Park, 2019; Scone Palace, 2021; Errol Park, 2022-present
- Years active: 2010-present
- Website: www.solasfestival.co.uk

Solas Festival is an annual music festival, held in Scotland, since 2010. The festival also comprises elements of poetry, art, politics, dance, philosophy and literature.

Described as a "wee Woodstock," the festival is associated with Creative Scotland, Scottish Refugee Week and Christian Aid.

The first three festivals were held in the village of Wiston. Since 2013 the festival has been held at various locations near Perth: the Field at Blackruthven from 2013 to 2018, Scone Palace in 2021 and Errol Park in 2019 and 2022. There was no festival in 2020.

== Line-ups ==
=== 2012 ===
The festival's 2012 musical acts included: Admiral Fallow, Roddy Woomble, Ricky Ross, Randolph's Leap and The Imagineers.

=== 2013 ===
The festival's 2013 line-up included: Karine Polwart, Liz Lochhead, We Were Promised Jetpacks, the National Theatre of Scotland, Breabach, and Margie Gillis.
