= The Monkey Pole =

Studio album by Hybrasil
- Released: 7 September 2007
- Recorded: 2007
- Genre: Indietronica
- Label: Manazo Records

Professional ratings
Review scores
Source	Rating
Entertainment.ie	3.5/5 stars

Monkey Pole is the debut album of Wicklow based band Hybrasil. The album was released by Manazo Records on September 7, 2007 and will feature some tracks from the band's two previous EP releases "We Got Music" and "When I'm Yawning".

== Track listing ==
1. We got music
2. San Fran
3. Heads Up
4. Getchoo
5. A Million Moments
6. Binary Love
7. Gorillas
8. God Bless The Devil
9. If You Feel
10. When I'm Yawning
11. Love Is In You
