= 28 Costumes =

English pop band

- Origin: Liverpool, England
- Years active: 2003–present
- Members: Christopher McIntosh; Tony Reilly; Andy Donovan; Paul Green
- Past members: Liam Keightly; Nick Hoare; Geoff Williams; Joanne Body; Alastair McPhee
- Website: http://www.28costumes.co.uk/

28 Costumes, also known as the Cossies, are a Liverpool pop band. They signed to Spank Records in late 2003 and released four singles and an album with the label. Their album, The Fake Death Experience was reviewed positively in, amongst other publications, The Independent and Artrocker magazine. The band have since released the EP Electrical Fever on Invicta Hi Fi Records, and self-released the single "Erika" / "Death Mask".

Their records have been featured on UK based radio stations by DJs Steve Lamacq, Huw Stephens, Janice Long and John Kennedy. The single "Erika" was featured on Hollyoaks and on BBC One programming.

The band played at the South by Southwest festival in Austin, Texas in 2007, at Glastonbury Festival in 2008, and supported Editors and Futureheads on tour.

In April 2010, lead singer Chris moved to Berlin. There was a farewell concert held at Le Bateau, Liverpool, in which the original line-up of the band re-united. The band have 2 albums recorded and finished that are yet to be released. The first (Adnventure Stories) was recorded shortly after the release of their debut album and the second (This Band Has Eaten All Our Money) was recorded in the summer of 2008. Currently the band are working on the 4th Long Player as well as pursuing various other musical projects including Hallo...I Love You! Silent Sleep, Elle S'Appelle and House That Jack Built.

== Line-up ==
Current lineup:

- Christopher McIntosh - Vocals/Guitar (2003–present)
- Tony Reilly - Guitar/Backing vocals (2003–present)
- Andy Donovan - Guitar/Backing vocals/Drums (2008–present)
- Paul Green - Keyboards/Percussion/Backing Vocals (April 2010 – present)
- Graham Jones - Bass (2010–present)

Previous members:

- Alastair McPhie - Drums (2005–2009)
- Joanne Body - Bass (2008–2009)
- Geoff Williams - Bass (2007–2008)
- Liam Keightly - Drums (2003)
- Nick Hoare - Drums (2003–2005)
- Paul Green - Bass/Backing vocals (2003–2007)

== Discography ==
=== Albums ===
- The Fake Death Experience (2004)

=== EPs ===
- Hoy (2003)
- Electrical Fever (2007)
- Die (2007)

=== Singles ===
- "Hurricane" (2004)
- "21 Years" (2004)
- "Cash Advance" (2005)
- "Inside/Outside" (2006)
- "You Excite Me" (2006)
- "Erika" (2008)
