= Blak Jak =

American rapper

- Born: Jafari Eady; 1983 (age 42–43); Decatur, Georgia, United States
- Genres: Hip hop
- Occupations: Rapper, songwriter
- Years active: 2006–present
- Labels: Vintage Sound Entertainment; Universal Republic Records
- Website: www.myspace.com/blakjak

Jafari Eady (born 1983), better known by his stage name Blak Jak, is an American rapper. His major label debut, Place Your Bets, was released in October 2006.

== Biography ==
Blak Jak grew up in Decatur, Georgia, and learned about hip hop from his cousins, who had formed a group called the Ward Boys. He took his name from the card game blackjack, which he played in high school. In 2006, he released his first album independently, which included production by Shawty Redd (who had previously won recognition producing for Young Jeezy); the first single from the album, "Ride & Swerve", featured guest rapper Project Pat and became an underground hit in the Southern US. Blak Jak continued to win fans after he released a mixtape with DJ Smallz, Roll da Dice, in the summer of 2006. On the strength of the single, Universal Records offered Blak Jak a record deal, and the independent album was re-released in October 2006 under the title Place Your Bets. The single "Bobbin' My Head" scored radio airplay toward the end of 2006, as did his collaboration with T-Pain, "Ball Out ($500)", in March 2007. In the summer of 2007, Los Angeles Dodger infielder Tony Abreu used "Bobbin' My Head" as his entrance music. In a 2007 retrospective of Southern hip-hop, Roni Sarig noted, "New rappers such as...Decatur's Blak Jak served to keep Atlanta front-and-center in Southern hip-hop".

== Discography ==
=== Albums ===
Year	Title
2006	Place Your Bets: Released: December 19, 2006; Label: Vintage Sound, Universal Republic (0007582); Format: CD, digital download

=== Singles ===
Year	Title	Peak chart positions	Album
Year	Title	US R&B	Album
2006	"Ride and Swerve" (featuring Project Pat)	120	Place Your Bets
2007	"Ball Out ($500)" (featuring T-Pain)	112	Place Your Bets
