= Vesta Varro =

'Vesta Varro were an Alternative Rock from Limerick, Ireland.

== Members ==
Damien Drea, Peter Forde, Keith Forde, Rod Smith, Shane Lee

== Background ==
The band released three singles, Blue Mirror Boy (2006) which was produced by Crowded House bass player Nick Seymour, Pyramid Clocks (2007) and Weighted Love (2007). Blue Mirror Boy reached number 33 and Pyramid Clocks reached number 36 on the Official Irish Charts. Their album Exit Here, which was recorded in Windmill Lane Studios in Dublin and produced by Richard Rainey, was released in June 2007 on Eavesdrop Music. The band toured in Ireland, the UK and North America and shared a stage with the likes of Editors, The Wonderstuff, Sultans of Ping and Ocean Colour Scene. They were named as 'Best Band' at the prestigious 'Indie Week' festival in Toronto, the 'Best New Musical Artist' at the MAMCA awards and "ones to watch" by the NME. The band's songs appeared on various compilation albums in the US, Australia, Germany, Canada and Ireland. Four of their songs were licensed to the American TV Network CBS. The band broke up in 2009.

== Indie Week Connection ==
In 2007 over 100 bands travelled to Toronto, Ontario to take part in a week-long music festival called Indie Week. The first and only Irish band to make the trip were Vesta Varro. The Limerick five piece took Toronto by storm and won the festival. They returned to Canada four times the following year to play sell out shows across Toronto while their debut album 'Exit Here' peaked at number 3 on the college radio chart and their music videos were put on heavy rotation on Canada's biggest music station MUCH Music. All this attention sparked an interest in Irish bands applying to the festival the following year. The band became good friends with Indie Week founder and director Darryl Hurs and between them they set up INDIE WEEK Ireland in 2008.

== Reforming ==
The band reformed for a once off gig in Dolans Warehouse Limerick on April 26, 2014.

== Releases ==
Blue Mirror Boy (Single – 2006) IRE #33
Pyramid Clocks (Single – 2007) IRE #36
Weighted Love (Single – 2007)
Exit Here (Album – 2007)

== Exit Here - Track Listing ==
  1.  Reaching Out 
  2.  Coming Back 
  3.  Pyramid Clocks 
  4.  Weighted Love 
  5.  I Agree 
  6.  Yellow Rooms 
  7.  Babies 
  8.  Blue Mirror Boy 
  9.  New Born Child 
  10. Believe
