= Little Sparks =

Studio album by Delorentos
- Released: 2012 (Ireland)
- Genres: Alternative rock, indie
- Label: Cottage Records/DeloRecords

Delorentos chronology
You Can Make Sound (2009)	Little Sparks (2012)

Professional ratings
Review scores
Source	Rating
Hot Press	4.5/5 stars

Little Sparks is the third album by Delorentos released in 2012.

== Further details ==
This album won "Irish Album Of The Year" at the 2013 Meteor awards.

== Track listing ==
All tracks are written by Delorentos.

No.	Title	Length
1.	"Did we ever really try?"
2.	"Bullet in a Gun"
3.	"Care For"
4.	"Petardu"
5.	"Right to Know"
6.	"Little Sparks"
7.	"Waited for you so long"
8.	"Pace Yourself"
9.	"Give it up now"
10.	"The stream"
11.	"Swimmer"
12.	"Witness in the dark"

== Chart performance ==
Chart	Peak position
Irish Albums Chart	10
