= Hogan (band) =

Irish band

- Origin: Tullamore, County Offaly, Ireland
- Genres: Power Pop; Pop rock Indie; Electronic
- Years active: 2006–present
- Label: Unsigned
- Members: Mark Hogan; Wayne Brereton; Ronan Nolan
- Past members: Jonathan Westman

Hogan were a four-piece pop rock band from County Offaly, Ireland consisting of Mark Hogan (vocals, guitar), Wayne Brereton (guitar) and Ronan Nolan (drums).

== History ==
Their debut album Boom! was released in 2010.

== Band members ==
- Mark Hogan – Lead vocals, Rhythm guitar
- Wayne Brereton – Lead guitar, Backing vocalist
- Ronan Nolan – Drums, Percussion
- Jonathan Westman – Bass

== Discography ==
Hogan discography
- Studio albums: 1
- Extended plays: 1
- Singles: 3

=== Studio albums ===
| Year | Album details | Peak chart positions | |
| Year | Album details | IRL | UK |
|---|---|---|---|
| 2010 | Boom: Released: 27 August 2010; Label: Self Released; Formats: CD, Download | — | — |
"—" denotes a title that did not chart.

=== EPs ===
| Year | Album details |
|---|---|
| 2013 | Gimme Love: Released: 7 June 2013; Label: Self-released |

=== Singles ===
| Year | Title | Peak chart position |
| Year | Title | IRL |
|---|---|---|
| 2007 | "I'm Gonna?" | 37 |
| 2008 | "Miss You" | 39 |
| 2012 | "No No No" | — |
| 2013 | "Gimme Love" | 75 |
"—" denotes a title that did not chart.

== Band nominations ==
- Hogan has been nominated for MTV Music Award Newcomer (IR) 2010
