= Young Wonder =

Irish electronica duo

- Origin: Cork
- Genres: electro-pop
- Years active: 2012–2019?
- Labels: Feel Good Lost Records
- Past members: Ian Ring; Rachel Koeman
- Website: Young Wonder on Facebook

Young Wonder were an Irish electro-pop duo from Cork.

== Career ==
Ian Ring is from Ballintemple and Rachel Koeman is from Watergrasshill, with a Dutch father. They met in 2012, and played at Castlepalooza in that year, and at the 2013 Latitude Festival. Their debut album, Birth, was nominated for the Choice Music Prize; The Irish Times called it "evocative and powerful, a run of songs that glisten from both slick studio shaping and some strong, deft hooks." By 2019 the duo had separated, with Ring making music under the name "Boku."

== Personnel ==
- Ian Ring (producer)
- Rachel Koeman (vocals)

== Discography ==
EPs

- Young Wonder (2012)
- Show Your Teeth (2013)

Albums

- Birth (2015)
