= Come with a Friend =

2006 single by Enrique Iglesias

"Come With a Friend"

Single by Director

from the album We Thrive on Big Cities
- Released: 2006-09-29
- Recorded: 2006
- Genre: Art rock
- Length: 3:46
- Label: Atlantic
- Producer(s): Director

Director singles chronology
"Reconnect" (2006)	"Come With a Friend" (2006)	"Leave It to Me" (2007)

"Come With A Friend"

"Come with a Friend" was the second single by the Irish art rock quartet, Director. It was released on 29 September 2006. Although not as popular as the band's debut single Reconnect, the single charted in Ireland at number twenty-six, and went on to spend three weeks in the Irish Singles Chart.

entertainment.ie noted the song for its "breezy effervessence".

== Live performances ==
"Come with a Friend" was performed on The Late Late Show, and also on an episode of The Cafe on 19 October 2006.

== Chart performance ==
Chart (2006)	Peak position
Irish Singles Chart	26
