= The Chalets =

Irish five-piece band (2001–2008)

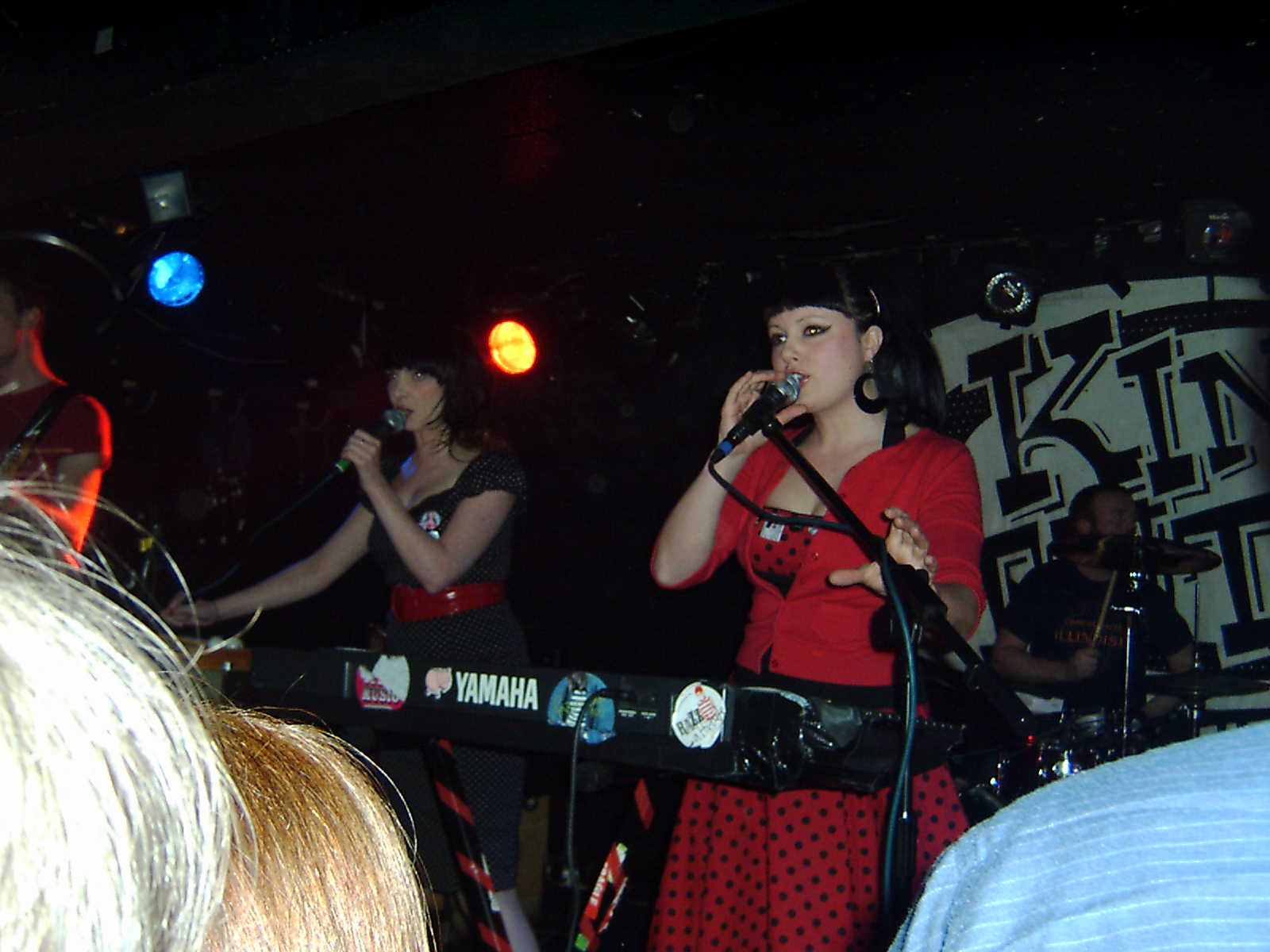
- The Chalets on stage at King Tut's Wah Wah Hut in Glasgow during their 2006 tour.

Background information
- Origin: Dublin, Ireland
- Genres: Post-punk, indie rock, indie pop, hard rock, garage rock
- Years active: 2001–2008
- Labels: Setanta
- Past members: Chris Judge; Caoimhe "Pny" Derwin; Dylan Roche; Enda Loughman; Paula "Peepee" Cullen
- Website: thechalets.com

The Chalets were a five-piece band from Dublin active from 2001 to 2008.

== Members ==
- Chris Judge – bass
- Caoimhe "Pony" Derwin – vocals
- Dylan Roche – bongos
- Enda Loughman – guitar
- Paula "Peepee" Cullen – vocals, songwriter, lead guitar

== Career ==
Formed in 2001, the band took their name from the fact that they were sharing chalet accommodation at the All Tomorrow's Parties music festival in East Sussex, 2001.

In February 2005, they were the victors of the Best New Band award at the Meteor Music Awards. Their first release, "Two Chord Song" was a split 7-inch (with Neosupervital) on the independent label RoadRelish, for which the band made their own artwork. It was quickly followed by a double-A side 7-inch released in March 2004 on Nasty Pop/Setanta Records, featuring "Theme from Chalets" and "Sexy Mistake", the latter being chosen by MTV as the soundtrack for the MTV branding campaign in Ireland. The Nightrock EP followed in October, their first release on CD, and the lead track "Nightrocker" was used worldwide (except in the United States) in the trailer for the film Madagascar. The EP was recorded in Dublin with Richard Rainey and Gareth Mannix.

The band were selected by the Irish government to represent Ireland by travelling to Slovenia in 2005 to take part in the celebrations for the country's adoption into the European Union. They also wrote the music for TG4's IFTA award-winning youth drama Aifric.

Their songs "Theme from Chalets", "Nightrocker" and "Sexy Mistake" have all been used on Grey's Anatomy, with "Sexy Mistake" being included on the second season's soundtrack. "Nightrocker" is also featured in the video game Outlaw Tennis.

The band announced their split on 15 February 2008 by means of a blog post on their Myspace page, citing a lack of financial viability as the cause.

Cullen and Derwin went on to form Talulah Does the Hula and September Girls.

== Discography ==
=== Albums ===
- 2005 Check In

=== Singles ===
- "Two Chord Song" (2003) 7" vinyl limited edition, double A-side with Neosupervital
- "Theme from Chalets/Sexy Mistake" (2004) 7" vinyl limited edition., double A-side single
- Nightrock EP (2004) CD EP featuring "Nightrocker", "Kiss Chasing", "Love Punch", "David Boring"
- "Feel the Machine" (2005) CD single featuring "Feel the Machine", "Fight Your Kids" (live)
- "No Style" (2005) CD single featuring "No Style", "C'est Supercool", "Where Did You Get Yourself?"
- "Theme from Chalets" (2006) 7" vinyl single featuring "Theme from Chalets", "Avalanche"

=== Compilations ===
- 'Other Voices 3 (2005) GoGo Don't Go
