= Delorentos =

Irish alternative rock band

- Delorentos during their "last ever" show on 21 May 2009.

Background information
- Origin: Portrane, County Dublin, Ireland
- Genres: Indie rock Alternative rock
- Years active: 2005 – present
- Label: Cottage/DeloRecords (independent)
- Members: Kieran McGuinness; Ross McCormick; Rónán Yourell; Níal Conlan
- Website: www.delorentos.net

Delorentos are a Dublin-based Irish alternative rock band, formed in 2005. They consist of Rónan Yourell (vocals, guitar, piano), Kieran McGuinness (vocals, guitar), Níal Conlan (bass, backing vocals) and Ross McCormick (drums, backing vocals). The band's debut album In Love with Detail was critically acclaimed in Ireland, being nominated for the Choice Music Prize and in the Best Irish Album category at the 2007 Meteor Awards, at which Delorentos were also nominated for Best New Irish Band. Two extended plays have also been released; their debut release, titled Leave It On, in October 2005, and the follow-up EP, titled Do You Realise, came out in November 2007. The Delorentos discography consists of a selection of singles which impacted on the Irish Singles Chart, such as "The Rules" in May 2006 and "Stop" in July 2007.

Aside from headline shows, Delorentos have opened a number of high-profile shows throughout their career. They have featured at numerous major festivals and tours including Electric Picnic, Oxegen and South by Southwest. Delorentos were invited to play a set at the 2006 edition of Other Voices: Songs From a Room and were also regular performers on The Cafe. They have built up a small fanbase in the neighbouring United Kingdom through appearances on television shows such as CD:UK. They have also had several songs feature on the PlayStation 3 karaoke video game, SingStar.

They briefly split in 2009, but got back together to release their second album, You Can Make Sound, Their third album, Little Sparks, was released in 2012, followed by Unbroken, Untied and Night Becomes Light in 2014. They released their sixth album in 2018, called True Surrender.

== Career ==
=== Formation ===
Each of the band members were in other bands prior to Delorentos, sometimes playing together, in what Conlan once described as "a weird web of bands through schools and colleges, until the four of us came together". McGuinness started playing with McCormick's school band around 1999, with Conlan joining the band soon after that. After this band failed, McCormick played with Yourell for a while, with McCormick and Conlan having played in a band together as well. Yourell then worked in France for a time but later returned to Ireland. Eventually the four grouped together to form Delorentos, whose name was taken from an older band in which a number of them featured. They were, by their own admission, "shite" until they went to Chicago to play "a rake of gigs". McCormick and Conlan were in college in the earlier days of the band's career.

=== Early career ===
Their first release, the EP Leave It On, was an entirely independent one and was launched in Whelan's in Dublin. The band collectively provided an amount of cash to record it at the start of 2005. McGuinness had a job, so he provided the money, with the rest of the band paying him back. Leave It On was released on the band's Delo Records label, with Cottage Records distributing it. Produced by Marc Carolan the four-track EP was released in Ireland in November 2005, entering the Top 30 of the Irish Singles Chart. The single, "Leave it On", went straight to number one in the Irish Singles Chart. Delorentos followed this with a tour which included an appearance at the UK industry show In The City (festival) and they were invited to participate in the 2006 series of RTÉ's annual Other Voices music show. This was followed in May 2006 by another single, "The Rules", which debuted in the Irish Singles Chart at number fourteen and spent a total of three weeks in this chart.

Just prior to this, Delorentos had come to wider attention when they represented Ireland at the National Student Music Awards (NSMA) in Dublin on 31 March 2005, where they were chosen as the Best Student Artist in the UK and Ireland. As part of their prize, they received free recording time at the BBC's Maida Vale recording studios and were invited onto the UK television show CD:UK, on which they confirmed the UK release date of their debut EP, Leave It On. The band followed this with another Irish tour and appeared on The Cafe in 2006 and 2007. They toured with other more established bands such as Idlewild, Bell X1, Whitey, The Futureheads, Gang of Four and Tapes 'n Tapes in locations such as London, New York City, Chicago and Toronto. Delorentos featured at both Oxegen and Electric Picnic in 2006, becoming the first unsigned act to perform at both festivals. In February 2007, they released the single, "Basis of Everything", to coincide with US dates in New York City and a series of performances at South by South West.

=== In Love with Detail ===
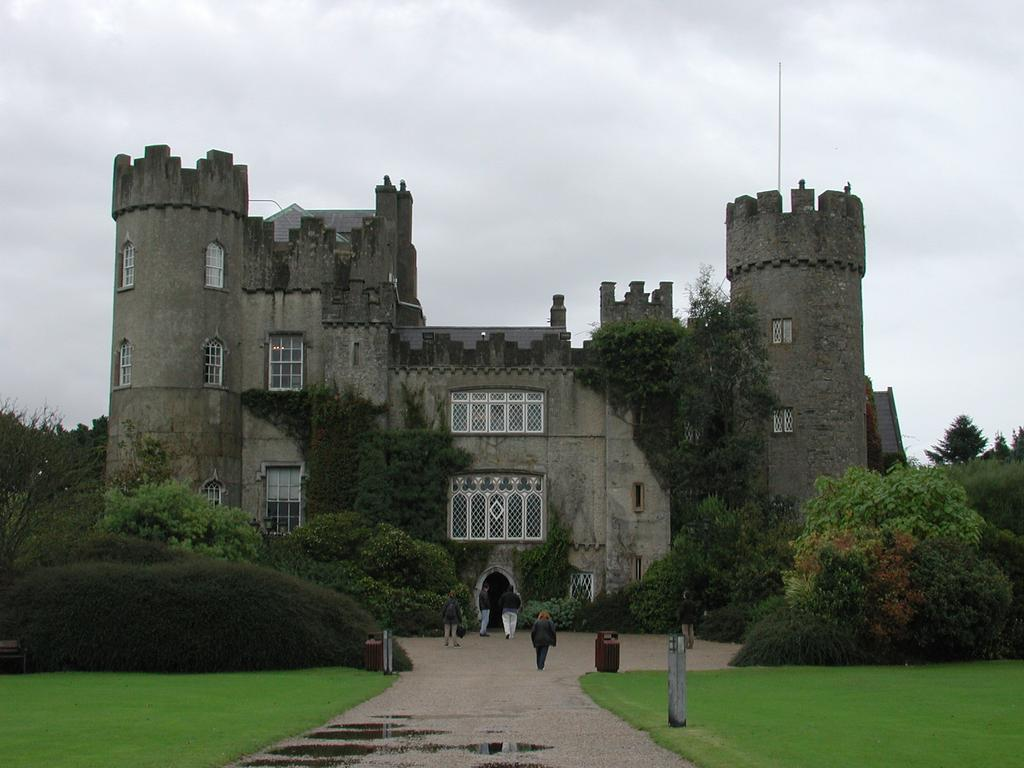
Further success led to Delorentos supporting Arctic Monkeys at two shows in Malahide Castle, Dublin (above) in June 2007.

Delorentos recorded their debut album in Dublin's Sun and Apollo Studios with Gareth Mannix. In Love with Detail was released on their own Cottage Records label on 20 April 2007. The album entered the Irish Albums Chart at number seven, spending five weeks in that chart, and later received a nomination for the Choice Music Prize. The majority of the album was written over the previous year. Later that year, Delorentos had festival slots at Oxegen, Electric Picnic and Cois Fharraige. At that year's Heineken Green Energy, the band supported Sinéad O'Connor and Kíla, they supported the Dave Matthews Band at the Point Theatre on 23 May 2007, and went on to open for Arctic Monkeys at Malahide Castle on two separate dates in June 2007. The single "Stop" was released in July. A second EP, Do You Realise, was released in November, spending two weeks in the Irish Singles Chart and peaking at number thirty-four.

Delorentos twice toured the United States during this time, including several dates in March 2008. The Irish Times selected their South by Southwest performance in Austin, Texas, in March 2008 as the best by any Irish act at the event. The band also performed at the Razz Club in Barcelona, Spain. However, they kept a low enough profile on the Irish live circuit for much of the year, only performing at a small number of festivals, including Oxegen, the Bandon Music Festival and the Drogheda Arts Festival. The Irish Times noted their performance in Pet Sounds on the Sunday of Oxegen 2008 by reminiscing upon their performance from two years previously in front of a smaller crowd early on a Sunday morning. Performances of the singles "Basis of Everything" and "The Rules" at Oxegen 2008 were described as having "the kind of hummable sheen that sounds as perfect at a festival as on the radio". Two extended plays were also released to accompany their debut; their debut release, titled Leave It On, in October 2005, and the follow-up EP, titled Do You Realise, came out in November 2007.

=== Brief split ===
The band's overall low profile in 2008 was initially thought to be due to them spending time working on their second album. However, in December 2008, Delorentos explained in their MySpace blog that a potential record deal had fallen through due to the prospective label encountering financial problems. Added to this, the collapse of Pinnacle, their distribution company, denied the band a chance to release their album in the United Kingdom. Their blog entry stated that "these are strange times for everyone, and for us in the music industry there has been a lot of uncertainty. It just happened that our opportunity coincided with this extraordinary time." After performing a number of shows with fellow Dubliners Director, Delorentos announced their break-up on 17 February 2009. The split came about after Yourell decided to leave the band due to his desire to "do other things". A MySpace entry stated: "It's with a very heavy heart that we have to let you know that Ronan has decided to leave the band. He feels its best for him to move on and do other things. The three of us will still be making music and will let you know about what happens next". However, they still planned to record their second album, believed to be titled You Can Make Sound, in March 2009 – it would contain all the songs they had written in the previous year – and play "a gig or two" as part of a farewell tour. The band's farewell tour includes shows in Whelan's in Dublin and Cyprus Avenue in Cork. Reaction to the split was generally one of shock – The Kinetiks were amongst the neighbouring bands they had influenced, Jacqui Carroll attributed her discovery of Irish music to an early Delorentos show, whilst blogger UnaRocks, John Walshe of State, Jonnie Craig and others had recently been championing the band's sound. On 22 April 2009, the band announced they would not split after all, citing a newfound excitement for recording as their reason. Yourell later explained that the band signing away their independent stance only to be let down by their record company had "knocked us out of our stride" and had led to him considering his future.

=== You Can Make Sound ===
Delorentos spent much of 2008 working on their second album, playing few live shows. By early 2009, they were reported to be performing with Director as both bands showcased material from their second albums. After the brief split, the second album by Delorentos, You Can Make Sound, was released on DeloRecords on Friday 9 October 2009 in Ireland, Reaching number 2 in the Irish Charts. The band released the title track as a free download and the single "Secret" was released on 16 October. They co-presented an edition of The Last Splash with Alison Curtis on Today FM on 20 December. In 2010, they appeared on TG4 music series Ceol Ar An Imeall. They represented Ireland in the Eurosonic Festival in Groningen, Netherlands in January 2010. You Can Make Sound was released in the Netherlands in March 2010, and Spain in April 2010.

=== Little Sparks ===
Delorentos' third album was released on 27 January 2012. It had been recorded over the summer of 2011 with producer Rob Kirwan in Grouse Lodge studios, Westmeath and Exchequer Studios Dublin. The album was different as Kirwan insisted on two weeks pre-production beforehand, something the band had not down before. The first single from the record, "Did we ever really Try" was released in October 2011 with an accompanying EP Magazine – written by the band with contributions from other artists and musicians. It reached number 10 on the charts, despite not being available in record stores, only the band's own "pop-up stores". The album release was notable for its inventive release campaign: they toured acoustically to release the preceding EP, "Little Sparks EP" (which was released as part of a full-colour 40-page creative magazine), they slowly released their songs on YouTube as part of an Acoustic project, and they opened up their own pop-up record shops to perform in on the week of release. The latter idea proved to be very popular – with the band visiting cities around Ireland and opening up one-day stores in empty shops. The critical reception to the record was the best of the band's career. It was described by entertainment.ie: "Little Sparks is not only an album which is Delorentos' best work to date, but one of the finest Irish releases of recent times" and by the Irish Times as "Full of brave, bracing and emotionally direct songs, it's the sound of a band who have found their musical and lyrical groove."

=== Unbroken, Untied ===
On 19 April 2014 Delorentos released Unbroken, Untied a self-recorded and produced Acoustic album. A collection of 13 acoustic tracks, nine of which were completely reworked versions of previous releases while four were unreleased tracks (three of which later appeared on subsequent album Night Becomes Light). The physical release was contained in a handmade individually stamped boxes, limited to 147 copies. These sold out in hours on Record Store Day, 2014.

=== Night Becomes Light ===
In winter 2013, the band returned to record in Grouse Lodge and Exchequer studios with Rob Kirwan. Signing their first international record deal with Universal music in July, the album was released on 10 October 2014 and went straight into the Irish top 5. It was released with the "Show me Love" single. It was named one of the best albums of 2014 by the 'Choice Music Prize'. The album received the best reviews of an already critically acclaimed career, including 5 stars in the Irish Times. The album was subsequently released in spring 2015 in Spain, in April 2016 in Mexico, in Germany and the UK in autumn 2016, and in spring 2017 in the Netherlands and Belgium. Each single from the album was released with an innovative video from Spanish director Antoni Sendra, aka Podenco.

=== "Vineyard sessions" Album ===
During the Spanish tour for Night Becomes Light, the band went into studio in Spain in a Vineyard close to Aranda De Duero. They demoed the bones of their upcoming 6th album. 16 tracks were recorded, however on returning to work further on them over the next few months, the band announced that the album would be shelved, and the band "felt that the songs weren't as good & honest as they needed to be"

"With the Vineyard album, we'd taken several days off a tour to record, and the owner of Sonorama [a Spanish music festival] gave us access to a recording studio and a vineyard. We had sixteen songs at demo stage, and we were happy when we finished. It wasn't like we suddenly put a cross through them all. I think it was a good Delorentos album, it was just the same as our last album, quite poppy, and quite what we felt people wanted to hear." "It gradually became clear that it wasn't 'us' anymore. A lot has changed for us in the last few years. Three of us have married and one has got engaged. Three have moved house, three have had babies. There's been a crazy amount of things going on. That wasn't reflected in the album we'd made."

The only song that remained from the Vineyard Album was "In Darkness We Feel Our Way"

=== True Surrender ===
In July 2017, almost 3 years since the last album, the band announced on their website that they were working on an as-yet-untitled sixth album in Attica Audio studios, Donegal. In November they released the first new song in three years – "In Darkness We Feel Our Way". In March 2018 they announced True Surrender would be released on April 27, 2018, and released another new song, "In The Moment". The also announced that the delay was due to the band "scrapping" an album (the "Vineyard" Album) they deemed "too close to what the band had done before and not a true reflection of the band's collective feeling" and starting again with True Surrender.

The Album received some of the best reviews of their career, including 9/10 from The Last Mixed Tape, 4 stars from the Irish Times, and 9/10 from Hotpress Magazine.

== Style and influences ==
A drum kit with the word "delo" written on it, as used by Delorentos.

Delorentos are known for their attractive guitar sound full of hooks and harmonies. The band's influences include Arcade Fire, Pixies, The Cure and The Clash. Their musical output has been likened to many modern British bands. The style of their single "Eustace Street", about a troubled love affair set in Dublin's Temple Bar, has been compared to that of Editors, and another single "Stop", influenced by a post-punk sound, has been likened to Bloc Party. The band's second single "The Rules" has been called "a sharp comment on the culture of casual racism". Conlan and Yourell like The Band, whilst Conlan and McCormick like The Redneck Manifesto. Conlan has stated that their earlier music had "a lot more dancey beats to it, but we're always chopping and changing". For instance, at one point the oldest song in the band's set list was "Leave It On" and that was only about eight months old at the time.

== Discography ==
Year	Title	Chart position
2005	Leave It On (EP)	24
2006	"The Rules"	14
2007	"Basis of Everything"	—
2007	In Love with Detail	7
2007	"Eustace Street"	—
2007	"Stop"	—
2007	Do You Realise (EP)	34
2009	You Can Make Sound	2
2011	Little Sparks (EP)	N/A
2012	Little Sparks	10
2014	Unbroken, Untied	14
2014	Night Becomes Light	5
2018	True Surrender	6

== Awards ==
The Sunday Tribune's Una Mullally said their debut album was "Best Hope For 2007".

Delorentos were chosen as the Best Student Artist in the UK and Ireland at the National Student Music Awards on 31 March 2005. The band were nominated for four Meteor Music Awards – "Hope for 2006" in 2005, "Best New Band" in 2006, as well as "Best Irish Band" and "Best Irish Album" in 2008. They lost out on the 2008 Best Irish Band award to veteran rockers Aslan. In Love with Detail was nominated for the Choice Music Prize in 2007, losing out to Super Extra Bonus Party's self-titled LP. The album also won 2007's Róisín Dubh Album of the Year, given by the Róisín Dubh in Galway. In February 2008 they won The Irish World's "Best New Band" Award in London.

They were nominated in two categories at the 2010 Meteor Awards: Best Irish Band and Best Irish Pop Act. That same year the band were successful in the Entertainment.ie Annual Awards picking up the Best Album of the previous year award.

In 2013 Delorentos won the Choice Music Prize Irish album of the year for Little Sparks.

Year	Nominee / work	Award	Result
2005	Delorentos	National Student Music Prize	Won
2005	Delorentos	Meteor Music Awards – Hope for 2006	Nominated
2006	Delorentos	Meteor Music Awards – Best New Band	Nominated
2007	In Love with Detail	Róisín Dubh Album of the Year	Won
2008	In Love with Detail	Choice Music Prize – Irish Album of the Year 2007	Nominated
2008	In Love with Detail	Meteor Music Awards – Best Irish Album	Nominated
2008	Delorentos	Meteor Music Awards – Best Irish Band	Nominated
2008	Delorentos	The Irish World's Best New Band Award	Won
2010	Delorentos	Meteor Music Awards – Best Irish Band	Nominated
2010	Delorentos	Meteor Music Awards – Best Irish Pop Act	Nominated
2010	Delorentos	Bray Music Video Festival – Best Band	Won
2010	You Can Make Sound	entertainment.ie Awards – Best Album	Won
2012	Little Sparks	Choice Music Prize – Irish Album of the Year 2012	Won
2012	Care For	Choice Music Prize – Irish Song of the Year 2012	Nominated
2012	Delorentos	entertainment.ie Awards – Best band	Nominated
2012	Little Sparks	entertainment.ie Awards – Best Album	Nominated
2014	Night Becomes Light	Choice Music Prize – Irish Album of the Year 2014	Nominated
2014	Show Me Love	Choice Music Prize – Irish Song of the Year 2014	Nominated
2014	Delorentos	entertainment.ie Awards – Best Band	Nominated
2014	Night Becomes Light	entertainment.ie Awards – Best Album	Nominated
2018	True Surrender	Choice Music Prize – Irish Album of the Year 2018	Nominated
