= Ballinlough Castle =

Country house in County Westmeath, Ireland

Coordinates: 53.634°N 7.026°W

Ballinlough Castle is a 17th-century country house situated near the rural town of Clonmellon in County Westmeath, Ireland on a hill overlooking two of the Westmeath lakes. It is the home of Nicholas and Alice Nugent.

== History ==
While a castle was reputedly built on the site in 1614, according to the date on the O'Reilly coat of arms over the front door, some sources question this date. Dating from at least the 1770s, the building was extended c. 1790, when a new wing was added by Sir Hugh O'Reilly, probably attributable to the amateur Thomas Wogan Browne, who was also responsible for Malahide Castle, the home of Sir Hugh O'Reilly's sister Margaret.

In 1812, the family changed their name from O'Reilly to Nugent. Hugh O'Reilly, who had been made a Baronet, assumed by royal licence the surname of Nugent under the terms of a legacy from his maternal uncle John Nugent. Since then several generations of Baronet Nugents have occupied the house. They are one of the few Irish Catholic families from the seventeenth century who still live in their original family home. The present owner is the 8th Baronet.

The grounds of the castle have hosted several music concerts. Artists who have performed there since 2006 include Kenny Rogers, Van Morrison, Pet Shop Boys, Tiesto, Alexandra Burke and Dwight Yoakam. The fourth annual Life Festival was also held in the grounds in May 2009. In 2010 the castle hosted Ireland's first gay music festival, MILK.

The Nugent family leased the lands of Ballinlough Castle to the music festival Body & Soul every year since 2010.

== House and gardens ==
The ground floor comprises a large drawing room and dining room with four first-floor bedrooms approached by a vaulted corridor above. The rooms have what may be the tallest windows in a private house of this period, overlooking the woods and lake. The chimneypiece in the drawing room is identical to a Wyatt chimneypiece at Curraghmore, County Waterford.

The gardens, together with the lakeside and woodland walks, are no longer open to the public. It was also the former venue for the Body & Soul music festival.

== Other Westmeath Castles ==
- Clonyn Castle a.k.a. Delvin Castle
- Killua Castle
- Knockdrin Castle
- Tullynally Castle
- Tyrrellspass Castle
