= The Kybosh =

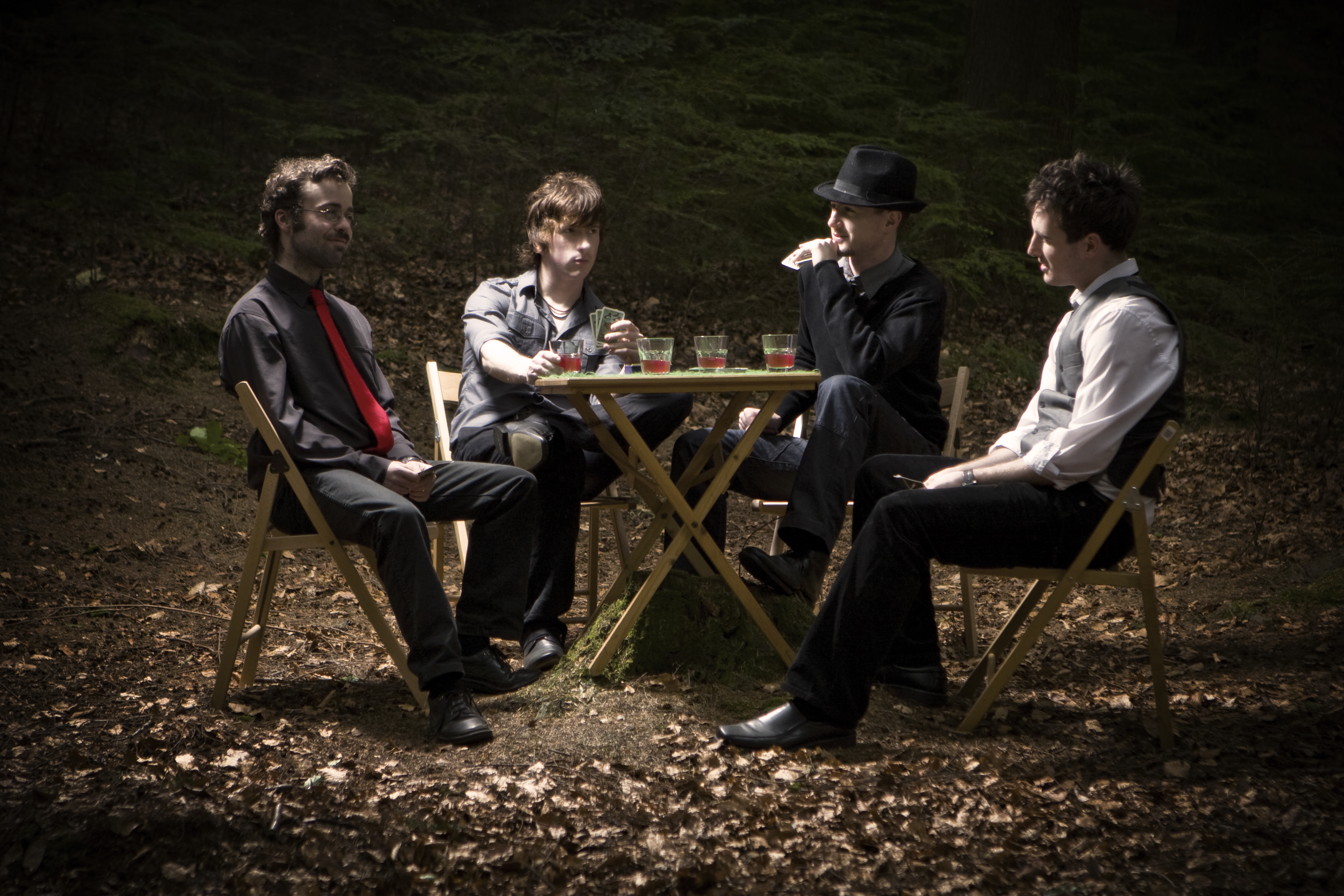
- The Kybosh L-R: Brian Higgins, Anthony Doyle, Donal Cumiskey, Rob Cumiskey

Background information
- Origin: Dublin, Ireland
- Genres: Indie rock
- Years active: 2007–present
- Label: Skankfish Records
- Members: Donal Cumiskey; Rob Cumiskey; Brian Higgins; Anthony Doyle
- Website: thekybosh.com

The Kybosh are an Irish rock quartet, made up of brothers Rob Cumiskey and Donal Cumiskey, Brian Higgins and Anthony Doyle based in Dublin, Ireland. They came to prominence with the release of their first EP, 'Rubicon' in February 2007, and entered the Irish Top 50 that month.

The Kybosh have been described as "combining a love of whistleable pop tunes with the dark, sharp edge of '80s new wave", and are influenced by bands such as Interpol, The Cure, Joy Division, Killing Joke, Echo & the Bunnymen, and early U2.

== History ==
In 2007, they released their first single, Rubicon, to critical acclaim from national newspapers and press such as The Irish Independent, and gaining airplay on national and regional radio stations such as 2FM.

They completed a summer mini-tour in 2007, supporting a number of bands such as Rough Trade Records’ 1990s.

September 2007 saw them release their second single, 'Fly by Night'. This was released as a free download. They also performed at the Hard Working Class Heroes festival in September 2007.

Tipped as one of the most promising bands of 2008 by John Meagher in The Irish Independent, The Kybosh released their mini-album, 'Until We Are Lost' on 23 October 2008.

After a brief hiatus, The Kybosh returned to release their three-track EP entitled 'Ignorance', on 6 October 2010.

== Members ==
- Donal Cumiskey — Vocals, guitar
- Rob Cumiskey — Bass guitar, backing vocals
- Anthony Doyle — Drums, percussion
- Brian Higgins — Keys, guitar

== Discography ==
- Rubicon EP (2007)
- Until We Are Lost mini-album (2008)
- Ignorance EP (2010)
