= Dark Room Notes =

Irish electro/synthpop group

- Origin: Dublin/Galway/Wicklow, Ireland
- Genres: electro/synthpop
- Years active: 2004–2013
- Label: BBE Records
- Members: Ronan Gaughan; Ruairi Ferrie; Arran Murphy
- Past members: Ruairi Cavanagh; Darragh Shanahan

Dark Room Notes were an Irish electro/synthpop group.

The three founding members, Ronan Gaughan, Ruairi Ferrie and former drummer Ruairi Cavanagh originally hail from Menlo, County Galway. Later members Arran Murphy is from Wicklow, and Darragh Shanahan, who was the band's drummer for four years, comes from Dublin.

The band's music has been described as electro/synthpop with a slightly sombre overtone and introverted lyrical sensibility. According to Village they "seem to gather comparisons with the murkier side of electro pop, usually bands like New Order, Interpol or Joy Division. While the comparisons have some basis, DRN are far from gloomy, just a bit ... cool... But this cool does not translate into pretension, just humorous and knowledgeable asides to their favourite artists, photographers and filmmakers".

The band's debut album We Love You Dark Matter was nominated for the Choice Music Prize.

== Career ==
Dark Room Notes formed in Dublin in 2004, recruiting drummer Shanahan in 2006. They performed their first gig in Galway in December 2006. Their debut single Love Like Nicotine was released in late 2007 on Gonzo Records, and became an alternative radio hit. This was followed in summer 2008 by the Dead Start Program EP, which featured lead single Slow Puncture and an early recording of Shake Shake My Ceiling.

The band were selected to play on the sixth series of the acclaimed RTÉ music show Other Voices. . Dark Room Notes topped the 'Viewer's Choice' poll on RTÉ for Series 6 of Other Voices.

Producers who have worked with the quartet include Flood, Tom Rixton and Ciarán Bradshaw.

The band recorded their debut album We Love You Dark Matter in London during the summer of 2008, with producer Ciaran Bradshaw. The album was released on Good Friday 2009 to widespread critical acclaim. DRN spent the ensuing months touring Ireland and playing all of the major festivals before being signed by BBE Records in the autumn. BBE released We Love You Dark Matter worldwide in spring 2010, preceded by the re-release of Love Like Nicotine on 8 February.

In January 2010 We Love You Dark Matter was nominated for the Choice Music Prize for Irish Album of the Year 2009.

In March 2010 DRN travelled to the CMW music festival in Toronto and SXSW in Austin, Texas.

In April 2010 drummer Darragh Shanahan announced his departure from the band with immediate effect. The remaining three members chose not to replace him, but to continue on using a drum machine.

Dead Start Program was re-released on BBE on 18 April 2011.

In November 2011 DRN performed a specially-commissioned, self-composed soundtrack to the 1925 silent film The Lost World, at The Model in Sligo.

The band completed the recording of their second album, entitled simply Dark Room Notes, which was released on BBE on 9 April 2012, preceded by the single, Baby Don't Hurt Me No More, on 5 March.

The band disbanded in March 2013.

== Band members ==
=== Members ===
- Ronan Gaughan — Vocals, guitar, synth, programming
- Ruairi Ferrie — Vocals, guitar, synth, programming, glockenspiel
- Arran Murphy — Vocals, synth, glockenspiel

=== Former members ===
- Ruairi Cavanagh — Drums
- Darragh Shanahan — Drums

== Discography ==
=== Albums and EPs ===
- Dead Start Program (GON002, CDS, 12 October 2007 - 4 track EP)
- We Love You Dark Matter (GON003 10 April 2009 - CD and Download)
- We Love You Dark Matter (BBE12ALP April 2010 - CD, 12" and Download)
- Dead Start Program (BBE 18 April 2011 - Download only)
- Dark Room Notes (BBE 9 April 2012)

=== Singles ===
- Love Like Nicotine (GON001, CDS and Limited Edition 7" Vinyl, June 2007 - 3 track single with remixes)
- Love Like Nicotine (BBE February 2010 - Download only)
- Elm (BBE Autumn 2010 - Download only)
- Baby Don't Hurt Me No More (BBE 5 March 2012)
