= Reconnect (song) =

Single by Director

from the album We Thrive on Big Cities
- B-side: "She's Saying Things"
- Released: 2006-04-24
- Recorded: 2006
- Genre: Art rock
- Length: 4:31
- Label: Atlantic
- Producer: Director

Director singles chronology
"Reconnect" (2006)	"Come with a Friend" (2006)

"Reconnect"

"Reconnect" was the debut single of Irish art rock quartet, Director. It was released on 24 April 2006, eventually dominating the Irish airwaves throughout the summer and receiving much radio play from Irish radio stations such as RTÉ 2fm and Today FM. The single charted in Ireland at number ten, spending a total of twelve weeks in the Irish Singles Chart.

National broadcaster, RTÉ, noted the song alongside third single "Leave It to Me" as one of the better tracks on the album, We Thrive on Big Cities.

In 2009, the Irish Independent referred to the song as "a debut single of exceptional potency", saying that its release had prompted excitement in "even those not normally given to hyperbole".

"Reconnect" was credited by some with helping Director win Best New Irish Act at the 2007 Meteor Awards.

The Irish Independent's John Meagher described the video for the Valerie Francis single "Punches" as "the best Irish promo since Director's Reconnect".

== Track listing ==
CD

1. "Reconnect" — 4:31
2. "She's Saying Things" — 4:34

== Notable performances ==
"Reconnect" was performed at the 2007 Meteor Music Awards where Director won Best New Irish Act.

== Legacy ==
Sunday Tribune journalist Una Mullally called it an "inescapable track" which was "one of the singles of 2006". In the same publication, Neil Dunphy said: "The understated cool of this single made it the most ubiquitous homegrown song of the year: you can still hear it on every other TV link and, unlike Peter Bjorn and John's "Young Folks", it still isn't annoying".

== Chart performance ==
Chart (2006)	Peak position
Irish Singles Chart	10
