= Leave It to Me (song) =

Single by Director

from the album We Thrive on Big Cities
- Released: 2007-01-05
- Recorded: 2006
- Genre: Art rock
- Label: Atlantic
- Producer(s): Director

Director singles chronology
"Come with a Friend" (2006)	"Leave It to Me" (2007)	"Be with You" (2007)

"Leave It to Me"

"Leave It to Me" was the third single by the Irish art rock quartet Director. It was released on 5 January 2007. Although not as popular as the band's debut single "Reconnect", the single fared better than their follow-up single and charted in Ireland at number seventeen, spending only two weeks in the Irish Singles Chart.

The release of this single coincided with Director winning Most Promising Act and Best Debut Album in the 2007 Hot Press Readers' Poll.

National broadcaster, RTÉ, noted the song alongside debut single "Reconnect" as one of the better tracks on the album, We Thrive on Big Cities.

On January 13, 2007, the song was performed on Tubridy Tonight, the band appearing alongside a range of actorial and medical guests: Wendy Richard, Dr. Mark Hamilton and Lorraine Pilkington.

== Chart performance ==
Chart (2007)	Peak position
Irish Singles Chart	17
