= Jim Aiken (concert promoter) =

Irish concert promoter

- Born: 1932 or 1933
- Died: February 27, 2007 (aged 74); Belfast, Northern Ireland
- Known for: concert promoter

Jim Aiken (died 27 February 2007) was an Irish concert promoter responsible for bringing many international acts to perform concerts in Ireland through his company Aiken Promotions, he was responsible for many big gigs in Ireland such as U2 at Croke Park, and concerts at Slane Castle such as Bruce Springsteen and Queen.

Aiken was from Jonesborough in County Armagh and played Gaelic football for the county. He spent four years in Maynooth College studying for the priesthood but instead went on to become a teacher of physics and maths at Harding Street school in Belfast.

Aiken died of cancer on 27 February 2007 at his home in Belfast, at the age of 74.
