= Neosupervital =

- Origin: Dublin, Ireland
- Genres: Pop
- Years active: 2006–present
- Members: Tim O'Donovan
- Past members: Lauren Kerchner, Jessie Ward, Dancin' Vin
- Website: https://www.neosupervital.com/

Tim O'Donovan, better known by his stage name Neosupervital, is a multi-instrumentalist based in Dublin, Ireland.

Previously, Neosupervital live was a band affair. Previous band members included Dancin' Vin, Jessie LoveAction and Miss K (Lauren). Jessie and Lauren went on to form the group Talulah Does The Hula.

He was also Bell X1's tour drummer for a number of years.

== 2006 ==
2006 saw Neosupervital being playlisted on MTV2 and playing festivals such as Oxegen, Castlepalooza and Electric Picnic. Neosupervital brought the live show around the UK and Europe as guests of The Human League in December 2006. Neosupervital has also opened for Money Mark, Peter Hook, The Divine Comedy and Tom Vek and caught the ear of Los Angeles radio station Indie 103.1 FM.

== 2007 ==
2007 saw the band playing high-profile club shows, touring Ireland and releasing a new single, "Now That I've Found It", with video (directed by Susie & Jessie Love Action) and remixes in April. Mid-2007 Neosupervital's debut album was released throughout Europe on French distribution label Le Maquis and in December 2007 the band was selected as part of the NYU Tisch/Hot Press music video program and released 'Alternative Day' directed by Alex Hilhorst.

== 2009 ==
2009 saw Neosupervital begin to record a 10-track album, Battery Power, and re-emerge into the live domain as a solo act again. Battery Power was released in 2010, and the first single, "Dance with You", was released on 10 July as a free download.

== Discography ==
- Neosupervital (2006)
- Battery Power (2010)
