= Gareth Mannix =

Irish record producer (born 1977)

Gareth Mannix (born 27 August 1977) is an Irish record producer. He has worked on platinum albums by Jerry Fish and the Mudbug Club, Damien Dempsey, Jack L and Juliet Turner. For six years consecutively a number of acts who have worked with Mannix have won Meteor Music Awards.

His live recording credits include The Divine Comedy (band), Whipping Boy, the Beta Band and Elbow. As a qualified recording engineer, Gareth further developed his studio craft working with masters such as John Leckie (Radiohead) and Richard Rainey (U2).

Throughout the decade, Mannix has worked with successful artists such as Republic of Loose, The Kinetiks, The Chalets, Humanzi, The Flaws, Director, Dirty Epics, Niall Colfer, Delorentos, The Minutes Philtre and The Blizzards.
