= Director (band) =

- Origin: Dublin, Ireland
- Genres: Art rock; pop
- Years active: 2005–2009
- Labels: Atlantic (2005–2008); Crapshoot Economics (2008–2009)
- Past members: Michael Moloney; Eoin Aherne; Shea Lawlor; Rowan Averill
- Website: directormusic.com

Director were an Irish art rock quartet from Malahide in County Dublin. The group consisted of Michael Moloney (vocals/guitars), Eoin Aherne (guitars), Shea Lawlor (drums) and Rowan Averill (bass guitar). The band's 2006 debut album We Thrive on Big Cities was a critical and commercial success in Ireland. A follow-up album, I'll Wait for Sound was released in 2009.

== Career ==
=== Style ===
Director are known for their "art rock vision", having been educated in college; Moloney studied classical composition. They have been likened to Joy Division due to their "monochrome sound". They have also been praised for reproducing the "clipped, emotional blankness" of Wire. The debut album, We Thrive on Big Cities, has been compared to the music of bands such as the Feelies, Mission of Burma, Television, Pere Ubu and Pixies, whilst second album I'll Wait for Sound drew comparisons to Depeche Mode and New Order.

=== We Thrive on Big Cities (2006–2008) ===
Director produced their debut single, "Reconnect" which led to a music video. It was released in Ireland and the UK on 26 April 2006. It was to be the first of three singles to reach the Irish Top Thirty Chart and stayed in the Irish chart for twelve weeks. The success of the single led to the band opening the Main Stage at Oxegen 2006.

Director's debut album, We Thrive on Big Cities was recorded alongside Stefano Sofia in Grouse Lodge in County Westmeath. Moloney wrote the songs. The band later spoke of their regret at having produced the album themselves instead of opting for a "bigger and rockier" sound. It was released on 6 October in the Republic of Ireland and included their debut single, "Reconnect". Within the first week of release, the album had reached number two in the Irish album sales charts, conceding the first place to Sam's Town, by the Killers; the album went on to go Platinum and spent a total of 29 weeks in the Irish chart. Over 20,000 albums were sold in Ireland alone. Director played a sold-out show in the 1,600 capacity Ambassador Theatre on 9 December 2006. The album's success led to the band securing support slots with UK bands such as Hard-Fi and the Fratellis. A UK and European release followed in 2007.

The second single taken from the band's debut album, "Come with a Friend", was released on 29 September of the same year. The third single from the album, "Leave It to Me", was released on 5 January 2007 but with no corresponding video. Both these releases were solely in the Republic of Ireland. Director were invited to participate in the 2007 series of RTÉ's annual Other Voices music show.

The album was nominated for the 2006 Choice Music Prize for Irish Album of the Year. It was also nominated in the Best Irish Album category at the 2006 Meteor Awards at which the band won the award for Best New Irish Act and performed their single "Reconnect" live. Director later split with Atlantic Records due to limited international success.

=== 2008–2009 ===
Director's single "Be with You" was released in Ireland on 11 May 2007. It was scheduled to be added to the track listing of the album We Thrive on Big Cities. The single is also due for a UK release, but the date is still to be announced. Director's summer 2007 shows included Slane Castle X-Fighters on 26 May and the Main Stage at Oxegen 2007 on Saturday 7 July and several sold-out tours in Ireland, as well as support slots with Snow Patrol and Razorlight. They headlined Indie-pendence in August that year. They also played on the main stage at the 2007 Trinity Ball.

Director played a number of headline gigs in Irish venues in December, including Dublin, Dundalk and Mullingar.

=== I'll Wait for Sound (2009) ===
Director released "Play Pretend" as a taster track from their second album in 2008. They performed three songs from that album at the O_{2}, Dublin, in March 2009. Director released their second album, titled I'll Wait for Sound, on 8 May 2009. The cover art was created by Albert Reyes. The album was preceded by the independent release of the single, "Sing It Without a Tune", on 1 May 2009. They wrote ten songs at a farmhouse in County Leitrim and completed the recording of the album over seven weeks with US producer Brad Wood in his Los Angeles home. Michael Moloney said:

You can expect a much harder sound than the first album but mixed with some of the softest, most delicate tracks we've ever recorded. I think we've captured more of the live essence of Director on this album. We've just released a song call 'Play Pretend' as a free download. It's quite an intense track and an indication of the kind of rocky sound people can expect.

The band embarked on an Irish tour in May. They performed as Saturday night headliners on the IMRO New Sounds Stage at Oxegen 2009. Another Irish tour followed that October.

== Discography ==
- We Thrive on Big Cities (2006)
- I'll Wait for Sound (2009)

== Awards ==
=== Choice Music Prize ===
Choice Music Prize, nomination for 2006 Album of the Year

Year	Nominee / work	Award	Result
2007	We Thrive on Big Cities	Irish Album of the Year 2006	Nominated

=== Hot Press Awards ===
Most Promising Act and Best Debut Album in the 2007 Hot Press Readers' Poll

Year	Nominee / work	Award	Result
2007	Director	Most Promising Act	Won
2007	We Thrive on Big Cities	Best Debut Album	Won

=== Meteor Awards ===
2007 Meteor Awards: Best New Band

Year	Nominee / work	Award	Result
2007	Director	Best New Band	Won
