= Fight Like Apes discography =

- Fight Like Apes performing live in the 2FM tent at Oxegen 2008 (l–r; MayKay, Tom)
- Studio albums: 3
- Extended plays: 3
- Compilation albums: 1
- Singles: 7
- Music videos: 4

The discography of Fight Like Apes, an Irish alternative rock band, consists of three studio albums, three extended plays and several singles.

== Albums ==
=== Studio albums ===
Year	Album details	Peak chart positions						
Year	Album details	IRL	UK	AUS	BE	JP	NL	US
2008	Fight Like Apes and the Mystery of the Golden Medallion: Released: 26 September 2008; Label: Model Citizen Records	9	—	—	—	—	—	—
2010	The Body of Christ and the Legs of Tina Turner: Released: 27 August 2010; Label: Model Citizen Records	3	—	—	—	—	—	—
2015	Fight Like Apes: Released: 15 May 2015; Label: Alcopop! Records	3	—	—	—	—	—	—

=== Live albums ===
Year	Album details	Peak chart positions						
Year	Album details	IRL	AUS	BEL	JAP	NED	UK	US
2009	Fight Like Apes Live At The Eurosonic: Released: 2009; Label: Fight Like Apes / Model Citizen	—	—	—	—	—	—	—

== Extended plays ==
Year	Album details
2007	How Am I Supposed to Kill You If You Have All the Guns?: Released: May, 2007; Label: Fifa; Format: CD
2007	David Carradine is a Bounty Hunter Whos Robotic Arm Hates Your Crotch: Released: November, 2007; Label: Fifa; Format: CD
2009	You Filled His Head with Fluffy Clouds and Jolly Ranchers, What Did You Think Was Going to Happen?: Released: 2009; Label: Model Citizen; Format: CD
2014	Whigfield Sextape: Released: 2014; Label: Alcopop! Records; Format: CD

=== Compilation albums ===
Year	Album details
2009	Fight Like Apes and the Mystery of the Golden Medallion (with additional CD of b-sides and remixes): Released: 2009; Label: Model Citizen

== Singles ==
Year	Single	Peak chart position		Album
Year	Single	IRL	UK	Album
2007?	"Jake Summers"	—	—	How Am I Supposed to Kill You If You Have All the Guns?
2008	"Lend Me Your Face"	—	—	Fight Like Apes and the Mystery of the Golden Medallion
2008	"Something Global"	38	—	Fight Like Apes and the Mystery of the Golden Medallion
2009	"Tie Me Up with Jackets"	—	—	Fight Like Apes and the Mystery of the Golden Medallion
2010	"Hoo Ha Henry"	—	—	The Body of Christ and the Legs of Tina Turner
2011	"Jenny Kelly"	—	—	The Body of Christ and the Legs of Tina Turner
"—" denotes singles that did not chart or have not yet charted.

== Music videos ==
Year	Song	Director(s)	YouTube link
2007	"Lend Me Your Face"	Briin Bernstein	Video
2008	"Jake Summers"	?	Video
2009	"Tie Me Up with Jackets"	Eoghan Kidney	Video
2009	"Something Global"	Eoghan Kidney	Video
2010	"Hoo Ha Henry"	Killian Broderick & Mark Duggan	Video
2011	"Jenny Kelly"	Vincent Gallagher	Video
2014	"Crouching Bees"	Grey Sun	Video
