= Cathy Davey discography =

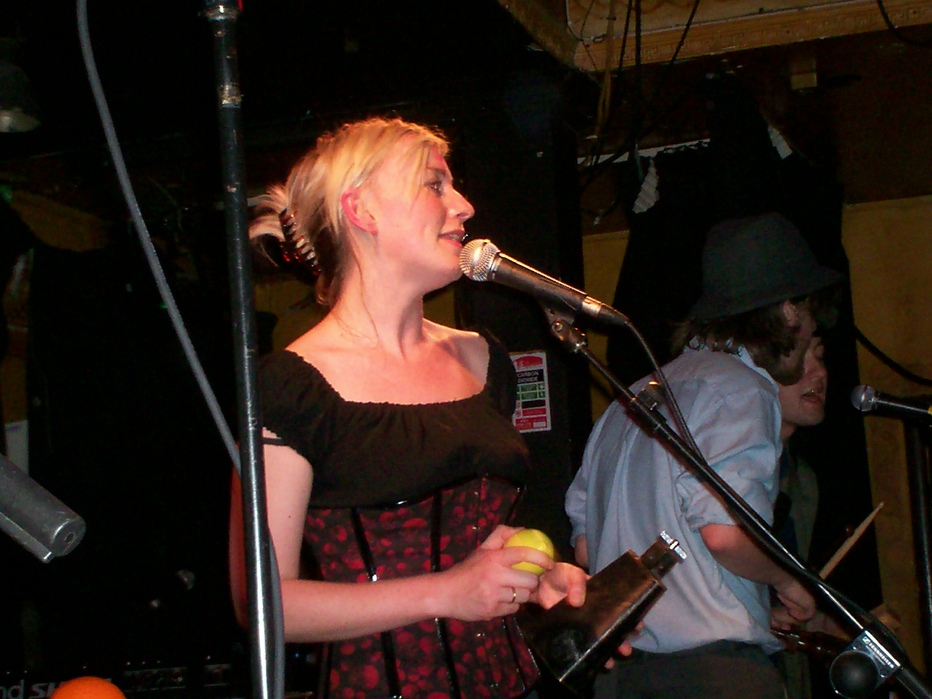
- Studio albums: 4
- Extended plays: 1
- Singles: 7
- Music videos: 6

This is a comprehensive list of all releases by the alternative singer Cathy Davey.

== Albums ==
=== Studio albums ===
Year	Album details	Peak chart positions	
Year	Album details	IRL	UK
2004	Something Ilk: Released: August 20, 2004; Label: EMI Ireland; Formats: CD, download	28	—
2007	Tales of Silversleeve: Released: 18 October 2007; Label: EMI Ireland; Formats: CD, download	12	—
2010	The Nameless: Released: 7 May 2010; Label: Hammer Toe Records; Formats: CD, download	1	—
2016	New Forest: Released: 9 September 2016; Label: Hammer Toe Records; Formats: CD, download	5	—
"—" denotes releases that did not chart or were not released in that territory.

== Singles ==
Year	Single	Peak chart positions	Album
Year	Single	IRL	Album
2004	"Come Over"	42	Something Ilk
2004	"Clean & Neat"	—	Something Ilk
2004	"Cold Man's Nightmare"	—	Something Ilk
2007	"Reuben"	42	Tales of Silversleeve
2008	"Sing for Your Supper"	—	Tales of Silversleeve
2008	"Moving"	—	Tales of Silversleeve
2010	"Little Red"	17	The Nameless
"—" denotes a title that did not chart

== Music videos ==
Year	Title	Notes	YouTube link
2004	"Come Over"		
2004	"Clean & Neat"		Video
2004	"Cold Man's Nightmare"		Video
2007	"Reuben"		
2008	"Sing for Your Supper"		
2008	"Moving"		
2010	"Little Red"		Video
