= Fight Like Apes =

Irish alternative rock band

- Fight Like Apes performing live in the 2FM tent at Oxegen 2008

Background information
- Origin: Dublin, Ireland
- Genres: New wave, indie rock, alternative rock
- Years active: 2006-2016, 2023-2024
- Label: Alcopop! Records
- Members: MayKay; Jamie Fox; Conor Garry; Peter O'Shea
- Past members: Adrian Mullan; Tom Ryan; Lee Boylan
- Website: FightLikeApesMusic.com

Fight Like Apes (also referred to as FLApes or FLA) are an Irish alternative rock band formed in Dublin in 2006.

Their final lineup consisted of Mary-Kate "MayKay" Geraghty (vocals and synth), Jamie "Pockets" Fox (keyboard and vocals), Conor Garry (bass), Peter O'Shea (drums) and Frog Cullen. Original members Adrian Mullan (drums) and Tom Ryan (bass) left the band in 2010.

They are known for their elongated record titles, usually inspired by B movies. They have released three EPs, How Am I Supposed to Kill You If You Have All the Guns? (2007), David Carradine is a Bounty Hunter Whos Robotic Arm Hates Your Crotch (2007) and Whigfield Sextape (2014), and three albums, Fight Like Apes and the Mystery of the Golden Medallion (2008), The Body of Christ and the Legs of Tina Turner (2010), and Fight Like Apes (2015). In 2009, they released an EP for the American market titled You Filled His Head with Fluffy Clouds and Jolly Ranchers, What Did You Think Was Going to Happen?.

Fight Like Apes have toured the UK with The Von Bondies, The Ting Tings, New Found Glory, The Prodigy and Kasabian and have played several Irish and European festivals throughout their career. They have appeared on several television shows in Ireland, including Tubridy Tonight, WeTV, The View, Other Voices and The Cafe. They have also had some success in Asia, where they have been signed up by Sony Music Entertainment Japan for an album release on that continent in April 2009. The band have been nominated for five Meteor Music Awards, Fight Like Apes and the Mystery of the Golden Medallion was nominated for the Choice Music Prize and was named 31st best album of the decade by Phantom FM at the end of 2009. Fight Like Apes were named the fourth best Irish musical act of their generation by The Irish Times in 2009.

Lacking financial stability to continue from their records, label, or merchandise sales, the band split up on 2 November 2016.

== History ==
=== Formation ===
Fight Like Apes formed late 2006 following the breakup of the band Soft Cuddly Toys by Mary-Kate Geraghty (known as "MayKay"), Jamie Fox (known as "Pockets"), Adrian Mullan and Tom Ryan. MayKay and Pockets first met as teenagers on holiday in Spain where they realised they both went to nearby schools and shared the same "extremely optimistically cynical outlook on life". When MayKay told Pockets she loved singing he had her sign a contract on a piece of tissue in a bar. Pockets's parents were unhappy with their son's "disgusting" taste in music. He dropped out of his final year of study at Dublin City University and a potential career in journalism to pursue his musical career. MayKay had been studying medicinal chemistry, and later a philosophy course at Trinity College Dublin. They habitually met from early morning and spent their days eating together before deciding to form a band. Their chosen name was inspired by Caesar's battle cry of "Now fight like apes" in what they describe as the "notoriously bad" Battle for the Planet of the Apes.

=== Early EPs (2007) ===
Their debut EP, How Am I Supposed to Kill You If You Have All the Guns?, Recorded by Lee Boylan and released by Irish indie label FIFA Records in early 2007, sold out and generated a significant amount of interest in the media and in the Irish blogging community in the process. In May 2007, Fight Like Apes won Phantom FM's Topman Unsigned Band Search; their prize was to be a support act of The Holloways at show in Dublin. Fight Like Apes played both Electric Picnic (their first major Irish festival) and Hard Working Class Heroes in 2007 and also performed at the CMJ Music Marathon in New York City. They were also chosen to play the Futureshock stage at EXIT in Serbia after sending a demo of their songs to the organisers. On 13 October 2007, Fight Like Apes performed "Jake Summers" on television chat show, Tubridy Tonight.

The title of their second EP, David Carradine is a Bounty Hunter Whos Robotic Arm Hates Your Crotch, released on 2 November 2007(produced by Lee Boylan), was inspired by the film Future Force starring David Carradine, which the band found on the internet. The EP's lead track, "Do You Karate?", was a minor hit on the Irish independent music scene. The band set off on their first UK tour after the EP's release and their "Jake Summers" single was released there through the label, Cool For Cats (sister of Fierce Panda). In February 2008, the band toured Ireland and the UK as a support act of The Von Bondies. Von Bondies member Jason Stollsteimer has described Fight Like Apes as "candy wrapped in barbed wire". Fight Like Apes were invited to participate in the sixth series of RTÉ's annual Other Voices music show, performing on 19 March 2008. They also appeared on RTÉ Two's WeTV television show. Fight Like Apes performed at the South by Southwest festival in Austin, Texas, in 2008. Upon their return from South by Southwest in March/April 2008, they went on a national tour of Ireland. Later that year, Fight Like Apes appeared at several music festivals in Ireland and the UK, including an appearance on the Futures Stage at T in the Park, and two appearances at the 2008 Glastonbury Festival, as well as Oxegen 2008 and Indie-pendence in Ireland. The single "Lend Me Your Face/Lightsabre Cock-sucking Blues" was released in the UK on 21–28 July 2008.

=== Fight Like Apes and the Mystery of the Golden Medallion (2008) ===
Fight Like Apes performing live in the 2FM tent at Oxegen 2008 (l–r; MayKay, Tom)

The band spent a month in Seattle, Washington, in early 2008, recording tracks for their debut album, produced by John Goodmanson. The album, titled Fight Like Apes and the Mystery of the Golden Medallion, was released on 26 September 2008 on Model Citizen Records, selling continually well in Ireland and the UK. It was preceded by the release of the single "Something Global" on 11 July 2008. They played a sold-out launch show at Whelan's in Dublin, which was broadcast live on Phantom FM on the day of release. The Irish Times described the album as an "astonishing debut that encompasses melancholy and whimsy (both lyrically and musically)". The Irish Independent, on the other hand, "strongly urge[d] all not to waste their money" on "the woeful debut" of a band with "lots of blogger and media friends, all aurally challenged". RTÉ also gave the album a lukewarm response. MayKay has said she is unbothered by any criticism as long as the album is simply being reviewed. Fight Like Apes and the Mystery of the Golden Medallion reached the top five of the Irish Albums Chart, meaning the band became the first alternative act from Ireland to achieve this for several years, and "Jake Summers" and "Lend Me Your Face" became regularly played at indie clubs throughout Ireland.

They went on to support The Ting Tings on a sell-out UK tour, receiving kung fu lessons from their security guard Preston and a champagne bottle on the final night. They appeared on The Cafe on 16 October 2008. The Prodigy personally invited the band to support them on their sold-out arena tour of the UK; all of the members are fans of Fight Like Apes and Liam Howlett entered their dressing room to give his regards. Sony Music Entertainment Japan signed the band for the Asian release of Fight Like Apes and the Mystery of the Golden Medallion. They headlined the Levi's One to Watch Tour in November 2008. In December 2008, a video of students of the Tisch School of the Arts in New York, featuring several females miming to "Digifuckers", was released.

=== Eurosonic, UK, US and Japan (2009) ===
Fight Like Apes represented Ireland in the Eurosonic Festival in Groningen, the Netherlands, in January 2009, This appearance led to the band qualifying for admission into the European Talent Exchange Programme, allowing the band to be booked for music festivals across Europe, including Glastonbury and T in the Park. Fight Like Apes and the Mystery of the Golden Medallion was released in the UK on 26 January 2009. The band played a studio session for Steve Lamacq of BBC Radio 1 around this time, with Maykay also encountering Jonathan Ross, a fan of the band who has played their music on his show. They released a video for a new single, "Tie Me Up with Jackets", later that month and performed the song on The View on 10 March 2009. Also In March 2009, came the release of the EP You Filled His Head with Fluffy Clouds and Jolly Ranchers, What Did You Think Was Going to Happen? for the US market as well as a return to South by Southwest.

Fight Like Apes on the Green Spheres Stage at Oxegen 2009. The band's drum kit is visible in the background.

Fight Like Apes and the Mystery of the Golden Medallion was released in Japan in April 2009, with Fight Like Apes filming a music video for the international release of their "Something Global" single in Whelan's, Dublin. On 3 April 2009, The Irish Times named Fight Like Apes the fourth best contemporary Irish musical act, above Lisa Hannigan and below Cathy Davey, Jape and David Holmes. The newspaper claimed that "Ireland has, quite simply, never seen a band like Fight Like Apes", reasoning that this was due to them "acting as a palette-cleansing antidote to the dour "woolly jumper brigade" that dragged Irish music into the depths of despair not a decade ago". They played at the 2009 Trinity Ball in May, an event likened to "a mini-Oxegen without the mud". The band's 2009 summer tour consisted of both domestic and European festival dates, and an appearance in Wales. Their performance at Festival Internacional de Benicàssim in Spain was cancelled due to a fire and extreme winds. Their performance at Oxegen 2009 was their second at the festival, with band members banging chairs during their performance and The Irish Times tipping them to appear on the Main Stage in 2010.

At the end of 2009, Fight Like Apes performed a show in The Academy inside a specially constructed wrestling ring. Their music was also being used to promote television series such as Making the Band and Valemont in the United States. The first album was named 31st best album of the decade by Phantom FM at the end of 2009. They will appear at Electric Picnic 2010.

=== Second studio album, Adrian's departure (2010–2013) ===
The Body of Christ and the Legs of Tina Turner, the second album by Fight Like Apes, was released in Ireland on August 27, 2010, through Model Citizen Records. The first single was released as a download only in Ireland on August 20, 2010, with the lead single being "Hoo Ha Henry". The band began promoting the album in Ireland on July 30, with live performances in Meath, Cork, Galway and at Electric Picnic in County Laois. The band appeared on Beat 102 103 to promote their new album on August 8, 2010.

Adrian Mullan left the band in 2010 due to "creative differences" and was replaced by Lee Boylan.

On Friday September 3, 2010, The Body of Christ and the Legs of Tina Turner entered the Irish charts at number 3. On 1 November, they announced an extension to their end-of-year national tour. In March 2011, they announced an Irish nationwide tour and released the single "Jenny Kelly". The band performed at The Trinity Ball 2011 with new bassist Conor Garry as Tom Ryan had gone back to college to study.

=== Whigfield Sextape EP and Fight Like Apes Third Album ===
On April 9, 2013, Fight Like Apes launched its Fund It campaign to help facilitate the making of their third album. The band received €20,000 in donations to cover the cost of PR, album artwork, equipment, mastering among other things. Donations ranged from €10 which would get the donor a signed version of the album up to €5,000 where the donor would receive VIP tickets to regular gigs and festivals. The band aimed to receive all donations within 34 days, and they were successful within a few days.

In the run-up to the launch of this new album, the band performed at two dates one in Dublin and another in Cork in December 2013. The band played a number of new tracks at both live venues. Fans who funded the new album were to receive a special EP. On May 12, 2015, Fight Like Apes released the Whigfield Sextape EP. In early 2015, the band played a number of dates in Japan and Ireland. They released their self-titled third studio album on May 15, 2015.

=== Breakup ===
On 2 November 2016, Fight Like Apes announced that their upcoming three shows would be their last, posting the following on their Facebook wall:

Stick a fork in us, we're done.

We've been quiet for a while now. We've had a lot of thinking and talking to do.

We'd be here all year if we started listing the people we wanted to thank, so we'll just do that in our own time.

You'll see us all again under different musical guises but, these 3 shows will be Fight Like Apes' last. We want to call it a day while we're all still pals and are proud of what we've done.

And we are very, very proud.

It's a deadly time in so many ways to be in a band; you can have so much control over your work if you're clever; you can release it how and when you like and in our opinion, right now, Ireland is the healthiest it's ever been in terms of talent and diversity.

But, there are massive challenges for a lot of bands, mostly financial, that make this a tough job and sadly, those obstacles have become too big for us. I think we all know that we're going to hear announcements like this more often. A lot of people don't seem to understand that we can't keep producing records if you keep not paying for them. Bands are having to sell beautiful albums for €2.99, labels can't give you as much support since they're losing income too and our alternative radio stations* are practically non existent now, meaning so many wonderful bands will not get a chance to get played on radio as they'll be competing with huge pop acts.

Please buy your music in independent record stores or directly from the band.

Don't fool yourself in to thinking that your £10 subscription to Deezer and Spotify helps us at all. It does not. Look how many bands are on there and do the maths.

Please go to gigs. Please buy merch.

Thanks to all you entirely crazy, wonderful people who have supported us and danced and screamed with us over the past 10 years. We could never thank you enough.

I still can't believe some of the amazing things we've done together and how far we came.

=== Return ===
On 23 April 2023 Fight Like Apes announced their return stating they would be playing at Electric Picnic that year, posting the line up and the following on their Instagram:

The first festival & worst appearance we ever made was @epfestival in 2007. Absolutely tanked it.

It's time for some redemption.

See you in Stradbally

On 11 May 2023 they announced on Instagram their participation at the All Together Now festival.

On 6 September 2023 they announced their planned gig at 3Olympia Theatre for 6 April 2024.

== Style and influences ==
BBC Radio 1's Steve Lamacq has described Fight Like Apes as a "great Misfit band" inhabiting "a lonely place out on the periphery of the indie rock world". At one show in June 2008, he witnessed them "thrash about on their guitars and keyboards and wotnot [sic] like it's some kind of pop exorcism" and saw them "rolling around the empty dancefloor playflighting [sic]". Today FM presenter Alison Curtis has described them as "really talented... kind of rocky and metallic and their front girl is extremely watchable, almost going into Debbie Harry territory".

The band's influences include B movies, computer games, kung-fu and wrestling. "Do You Karate?", "a thumping bass driven flourish of a song", displays the band's "trademark twin-synth attack" and the Pixies-style "Canhead" has been described as "a concise ode to fish and chips". Musically they are fond of My Bloody Valentine, Mclusky and Tom Waits, Grand Pocket Orchestra, Adebisi Shank, Jape and Giveamanakick. They dislike guitars and have been known to perform with kitchen implements such as pots and pans when on stage; MayKay and Pockets even play keyboards with their heads. They purposefully construct lengthy record titles to "piss off" journalists and radio presenters and their self-defined "karate rock" genre was directed at the NME after the British magazine tried to place them in the same category as two other female-fronted bands.

Vocalist MayKay has been described as one of Ireland's "most mesmerising front women" in recent history, with her long black hair and banshee wail. She is known for lyrics such as "you're like Kentucky Fried Chicken but without the taste" and "you're a fucking disappointment to the human race", taken from the song "Jake Summers", a song inspired by former teen idol of California Dreams fame. Pockets writes most of the band's songs, plays the keyboard and provides vocals for some of the band's songs. Adrian and Tom tend to remain in the background, choosing not to be photographed. The band claim to have never written anything fictional and their lyrics have been described by Nadine O'Regan in The Sunday Business Post as "occasionally literally gynaecological in their detail and regularly relatively shocking in their honesty". MayKay and Pockets claim that most of their lyrics are shaped by one person who has broken each of their hearts.

== Discography ==
=== Studio albums ===
- Fight Like Apes and the Mystery of the Golden Medallion (2008)
- The Body of Christ and the Legs of Tina Turner (2010)
- Fight Like Apes (2015)

== Awards ==
=== Choice Music Prize ===
The band's debut album, Fight Like Apes and the Mystery of the Golden Medallion, was nominated for the Choice Music Prize in January 2009. The award was won by Jape for the album Ritual on 4 March 2009.

The Body of Christ and the Legs of Tina Turner was nominated for the Choice Music Prize in 2011.

Year	Nominee / work	Award	Result
2009	Fight Like Apes and the Mystery of the Golden Medallion	Irish Album of the Year 2008	Nominated
2011	The Body of Christ and the Legs of Tina Turner	Irish Album of the Year 2010	Nominated

=== Meteor Music Awards ===
Fight Like Apes were nominated for two Meteor Awards in 2008, one for Best Irish Live Performance for their November 2007 show at Whelan's in Dublin and the other for Best Irish Band. In 2009, they were nominated for three Meteor Music Awards, for Best Irish Band, Best Irish Live Performance and Best Irish Album.

Year	Nominee / work	Award	Result
2008	Fight Like Apes	Best Irish Band	Nominated
2008	Whelan's	Best Irish Live Performance	Nominated
2009	Fight Like Apes and the Mystery of the Golden Medallion	Best Irish Album	Nominated
2009	Fight Like Apes	Best Irish Band	Nominated
2009	Whelan's	Best Irish Live Performance	Nominated

=== UK Festival Awards ===
In September 2009, Fight Like Apes were nominated in the Best Breakthrough Artists category at the UK Festival Awards, competing against three British and one American acts—Florence and The Machine, Little Boots, Passion Pit and Friendly Fires.

Year	Nominee / work	Award	Result
2009	Fight Like Apes	Best Breakthrough Artists	Nominated

=== IMTV Music Video Awards 2009 ===
"Something Global" won the award for Most Original Concept at the 2009 Irish Music Television Awards. The video was directed by Eoghan Kidney.

Year	Nominee / work	Award	Result
2009	"Something Global" video	2009 Irish Music Television Video Music Awards	Won
