= 2008 Meteor Awards =

Republic of Ireland national music award ceremony

- Meteor Awards 2008 logo
- Date: 15 February 2008
- Location: RDS Simmonscourt
- Presented by: Dara Ó Briain
- Website: meteormusicawards.meteor.ie/index.aspx

Television/radio coverage
- Network: RTÉ Two

The 2008 Meteor Music Awards ceremony was held in the RDS Simmonscourt, Dublin, on Friday, 15 February 2008. Nineteen awards were presented. It was the eighth edition of the Republic of Ireland's national music awards. The event was later broadcast on RTÉ Two on Saturday, 16 February at 21:00 and was hosted by comedian Dara Ó Briain for the first time since 2004.

Duke Special and Cathy Davey won the Best Irish Male and Best Irish Female Awards respectively, whilst veteran rockers Aslan won the Best Irish Band Award and Paddy Casey's Addicted to Company won Best Irish Album. For the eighth consecutive year Westlife won the Best Irish Pop Act accolade. Ham Sandwich were presented with the Hope for 2008 Meteor Award by RTÉ 2fm DJ Rick O'Shea. The Blizzards won Best Irish Live Performance for their Main Stage appearance at Oxegen 2007, whilst Muse picked up the award for Best International Live Performance, which also occurred at Oxegen the previous year. The award for the Most Downloaded Song was given to Mundy and Sharon Shannon's chart hit "Galway Girl". The Saw Doctors were presented with a Lifetime Achievement Award and were also amongst the performers at the event.

== Performances ==
There were performances at the event from The Saw Doctors, Boyzone, The Coronas, Cathy Davey, Westlife, Shayne Ward, Tom Baxter, Paddy Casey and Scouting for Girls, as well as exclusive duets between Sinéad O'Connor and Mick Pyro of Republic of Loose, who performed the Curtis Mayfield song, "We People Who Are Darker Than Blue" and Gary Lightbody and Lisa Hannigan who performed, live for the first time, "Some Surprise" from The Cake Sale charity album.

== Nominations ==
=== Public voting categories ===
==== Best Irish Male ====
- Paddy Casey
- Damien Dempsey
- Duke Special
- Glen Hansard
- David Geraghty
- Declan O'Rourke

==== Best Irish Female ====
- Andrea Corr
- Cathy Davey
- Maria Doyle Kennedy
- Róisín Murphy
- Sinéad O'Connor
- Dolores O'Riordan

==== Best Irish Band ====
- Ash
- Aslan
- Fight Like Apes
- Delorentos
- The Flaws
- Future Kings of Spain

==== Best Irish Album ====
- Addicted to Company
- Tales of Silversleeve
- In Love with Detail
- Achieving Vagueness
- Nervousystem
- Kill Your Darlings

==== Best Irish Live Performance ====
- Bell X1 – Malahide Castle
- The Blizzards – Oxegen 2007
- Duke Special – Vicar Street
- Fight Like Apes – Whelan's
- Future Kings of Spain – The Village
- Damien Rice – Marlay Park

==== Best Irish Pop Act ====
- Bell X1
- The Blizzards
- The Coronas
- Brian McFadden
- Róisín Murphy
- Westlife

==== Best National DJ ====
- Ray D'Arcy – Today FM
- Ian Dempsey – Today FM
- Tom Dunne – Today FM
- Dave Fanning – RTÉ 2fm
- Ray Foley – Today FM
- Rick O'Shea – RTÉ 2fm

==== Best Regional DJ ====
- Pete Casey
- Keith Cunningham
- Leigh Doyle
- Joe & Keith
- Mark Noble
- Jon Richards

==== Hope for 2008 ====
- Leanne Harte
- Owen Brady
- The Kinetiks
- We Should Be Dead
- Ham Sandwich

=== Non-public voting categories ===
==== Best Traditional/Folk ====
- Damien Dempsey
- Tommy Fleming
- Kíla
- Moving Hearts
- Majella Murphy
- Sharon Shannon

==== Best International Male ====
- Richard Hawley
- Bruce Springsteen
- Timbaland
- Justin Timberlake
- Rufus Wainwright
- Kanye West

==== Best International Female ====
- Björk
- PJ Harvey
- Kylie Minogue
- Kate Nash
- Rihanna
- Amy Winehouse

==== Best International Band ====
- Arcade Fire
- The Killers
- Kings of Leon
- Radiohead
- The Shins
- Take That

==== Best International Album ====
- Neon Bible
- Boxer
- White Chalk
- Sound of Silver
- Raising Sand
- In Rainbows

==== Best International Live Performance ====
- Arcade Fire – Olympia Theatre
- Björk – Electric Picnic 07
- Muse – Oxegen 2007
- The Police – Croke Park
- Bruce Springsteen – The Point
- Justin Timberlake – RDS Arena

=== Lifetime Achievement Award ===
- The Saw Doctors

=== Most Downloaded Song ===
- "Galway Girl" – Mundy and Sharon Shannon
