= How Am I Supposed to Kill You If You Have All the Guns? =

EP by Fight Like Apes
- Released: May 2007
- Genre: Alternative rock, karate rock, punk rock
- Label: FIFA Records

Fight Like Apes chronology
How Am I Supposed to Kill You If You Have All the Guns? (2007)	David Carradine is a Bounty Hunter Whos Robotic Arm Hates Your Crotch (2007)

How Am I Supposed to Kill You If You Have All the Guns? is the debut four-track EP of Fight Like Apes. It was released by Irish indie label FIFA Records in May 2007 and sold out, generating a significant amount of media interest in the process. Three of the four tracks from this EP were reworked for Fight Like Apes and the Mystery of the Golden Medallion, the band's debut album. The reworked songs were "Jake Summers", "Lend Me Your Face" and "Battlestations".

Despite the band having not released an album by this time, Dublin's journalists praised Fight Like Apes after hearing the EP. The band played both Electric Picnic, which was their first major Irish festival, and Hard Working Class Heroes in 2007 on the back of the release of How Am I Supposed to Kill You If You Have All the Guns? They also performed at the CMJ Music Marathon in New York City.

The parents of the band's main songwriter, Pockets, were reported to have been "horrified" when they first heard the EP, labelling the efforts of him and his bandmates as "disgusting". They were said to be displeased with the "electric shocks, digital distortion, blisteringly brutal lyrics and the screechy vocals" of vocalist MayKay.

== Reception ==
Professional ratings
Review scores
Source	Rating
entertainment.ie	link
Hot Press	link

How Am I Supposed to Kill You If You Have All the Guns? was a critically acclaimed album in Ireland. "Lend Me Your Face" was played regularly on alternative radio shows and is viewed as an anthem at all their Irish shows.

Hot Press described How Am I Supposed to Kill You If You Have All the Guns? as "a serious achievement" and "a kaleidoscope of different ideas that somehow manages to hang together and forge its own identity". The magazine declared three of the four songs suitable for daytime radio if the occasional expletive was ignored.

entertainment.ie gave the EP four out of five stars, declaring it "an absolute sucker-punch of a debut release". They described lead track "Jake Summers" as "a dizzy punk-synth explosion" and last track "Battlestations" as "a twisted, haphazard synthfest that sounds like a modern take on an '80s video nasty compilation". Most praise was, however, reserved for "Lend Me Your Face", described as "a razor-sharp peal of punk thunder".

"Jake Summers" later received a UK release as a 7" vinyl through the Cool For Cats label. The song was inspired by a character from the TV series California Dreams, who the band thought was a "fucking disappointment to the human race".

== Television performance ==
On 13 October 2007, Fight Like Apes performed the lead track "Jake Summers" on television chat show, Tubridy Tonight.

== Track listing ==
All tracks are written by Fight Like Apes

No.	Title	Length
1.	"Jake Summers"	3:57
2.	"Lend Me Your Face"	1:56
3.	"You Are the Hat"	2:14
4.	"Battlestations"	3:54
