= David Carradine is a Bounty Hunter Whos Robotic Arm Hates Your Crotch =

EP by Fight Like Apes
- Released: 2 November 2007
- Genre: Alternative rock, karate rock, punk rock

Fight Like Apes chronology
How Am I Supposed to Kill You If You Have All the Guns? (2007)	David Carradine is a Bounty Hunter Whos Robotic Arm Hates Your Crotch (2007)	Fight Like Apes and the Mystery of the Golden Medallion (2008)

David Carradine is a Bounty Hunter Whos Robotic Arm Hates Your Crotch is the second EP by alternative rock band Fight Like Apes. It was released on 2 November 2007. The EP is slightly more than eleven minutes in length. Two of the four tracks from this EP were reworked for Fight Like Apes and the Mystery of the Golden Medallion, the band's debut album. The reworked songs were "Do You Karate?" and "Snore Bore Whore".

The EP's lead track "Do You Karate?" was a minor hit on the Irish independent music scene. The band set off on their first UK tour after the EP's release, with their "Jake Summers" single from their previous EP, How Am I Supposed to Kill You If You Have All the Guns?, being released there through the label, Cool For Cats (sister of Fierce Panda).

== Title ==
The title was inspired by the film Future Force starring the actor David Carradine, which the band found on the internet. The misspelling of "whose" is, according to a Fight Like Apes press release, an attempt to "reinvent the English language".

== Reception ==
Professional ratings
Review scores
Source	Rating
entertainment.ie	3.5/5 stars
Sputnikmusic	4/5 stars

entertainment.ie gave the EP three and a half stars out of five, dubbing it "a sophomore offering to relish". They described "Do You Karate?" as having a "rude buzz-rock-bass-thump", "Canhead" as "a neat, jerky, burst of whimsical brilliance" and "Accidental Wrong Hole" as "succinctly aggressive". Most praise was, however, reserved for "Snore Bore Whore", which they described as evidence of vocalist MayKay's ability to sing "pastoral as well as blow-your-eardrums-out cacophony".

Sputnikmusic selected "Canhead" as their favourite track, drawing comparisons with Pixies. Synthist Pockets "does his best Frank Black" and vocalist MayKay "shreds her vocal chords" over a meal of fish and chips. They also reference Zac Attack and Milli Vanilli, who is regarded as of a higher quality than brown bread on the track "Accidental Wrong Hole". "Do You Karate?" is described as the "most urgent" of the four tracks on the EP, drawing comparisons to Karen O and her style of using the word "shit". "Snore Bore Whore" is suggested as belonging on the soundtrack of Happy Gilmore.

== Live dates ==
Fight Like Apes embarked on an Irish tour upon the release of David Carradine Is A Bounty Hunter Whose Robotic Arm Hates Your Crotch. On the day of its release they played The Underground in Limerick, followed by a performance in Carlow and a date in Whelan's in Dublin on 16 November 2007. A limited edition 12" compilation of David Carradine Is A Bounty Hunter Whose Robotic Arm Hates Your Crotch and its predecessor How Am I Supposed to Kill You If You Have All the Guns? was available exclusively at the Whelan's date.

== Track listing ==
All tracks are written by Fight Like Apes

No.	Title	Length
1.	"Do You Karate?"	2:34
2.	"Canhead"	2:09
3.	"Accidental Wrong Hole"	1:49
4.	"Snore Bore Whore"	4:38

== Personnel ==
- Maykay – Keyboards, Recorder, Vocals
- Jamie Fox – Keyboard and vocals
- Tom Ryan – Bass
- Adrian Mullan – Drums
