= Mona-Lxsa =

- Origin: Ireland
- Years active: 2018–present
- Website: Mona-Lxsa on Facebook

Mona-Lxsa is a Malawian-Irish DJ and founder of GXRLCODE.

== Career ==
Mona-Lxsa has performed at Electric Picnic in 2018 and 2019, Longitude and Body & Soul. In 2019, she ran a series of nights in Dublin called Dejavu. In March 2020, she was featured as part of Hot Press's Lockdown Sessions. She regularly performs with Soulé.

Mona-Lxsa founded GXRLCODE, a female creative collective and platform in 2018, which she runs with Grace Enemaku. She was one of 6 representative from Ireland that took part in PRS Foundation's Keychange Development Programme in 2020. In 2020, she was one of the people selected to take over social media accounts as part of the #ShareTheMicNow campaign to increase the reach of women of colour, taking over the account of stylist Courtney Smith.

== Personal life ==
Mona-Lxsa was born in Malawi, and moved to Ireland at age 17. She studied Business Management at university.
