= Sorcha Richardson =

Irish singer-songwriter from County Galway

- Born: Sorcha Richardson; 22 September 1990 (age 35); Dublin, Ireland
- Origin: Dalkey
- Genres: Pop; lo-fi indie; folk rock; synth-pop
- Occupation: Singer-songwriter
- Instrument: guitar
- Years active: 2012–present
- Labels: Faction Records & R&R Records
- Website: sorcharichardson.com

Sorcha Richardson (born 22 September 1990) is an Irish singer-songwriter from Dublin.

== Early life ==
Sorcha Richardson grew up in Dalkey. She formed her first band aged 10 with schoolfriends.

She went to Brooklyn to study creative writing.

== Career ==
Richardson came back to Dublin in late 2017. In 2018 she played at Longitude Festival and was named as one of RTÉ 2FM's Rising Artists, and she has worked with the Irish band All Tvvins.

Her debut album First Prize Bravery (on the theme of "negotiating friendships and relationships") was released in 2019 and was nominated for the Choice Music Prize. She collaborated with Soulé and Elaine Mai on a single, Butterflies, in 2019 as part of the Three Ireland Made by Music campaign.

In 2022, she released her second album, Smiling Like an Idiot.

== Discography ==
Studio albums

- First Prize Bravery (2019)
- Smiling Like an Idiot (2022) – No. 4 Irish Albums Chart
- Draw the Outline (2026) – No. 85 Irish Albums Chart

EPs

- Sleep Will Set Me Free (2012)
- Last Train (2013)
- Isolation Home Recordings (2020)
