= Climate Week NYC =

Annual charity event in New York City

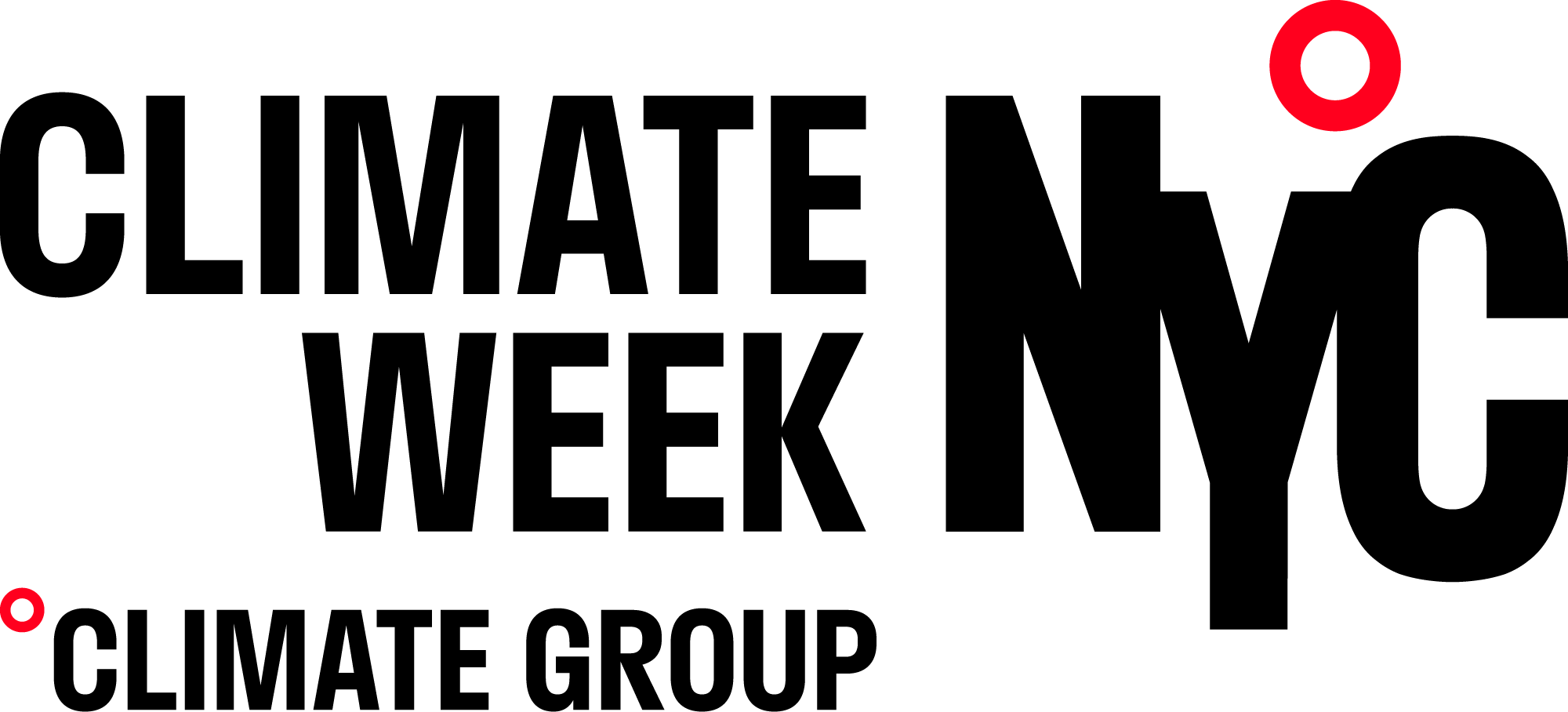
- Climate Week NYC logo
- Founded: 2009
- Type: Environmental Charity
- Purpose: Climate change, conferences
- Location: New York City, US
- Region served: International
- Website: www.climateweeknyc.org

Climate Week NYC is a charity event that takes place in New York City every year. Its purpose is to promote climate action by appealing to "business leaders, political change makers, local decision takers and civil society representatives". Climate Week NYC is run by Climate Group. It is the largest of the organization's annual flagship international events, and the largest annual climate event of its kind according to the organizers.

== History ==
The first Climate Week NYC took place in 2009. The summit is held alongside the United Nations General Assembly, allowing heads of state and other senior governmental figures to attend and participate.

Climate Week NYC considers itself the largest annual climate event of its kind. It was described by the New York Times as the ‘Burning Man for Climate Geeks’.

Climate Week NYC also creates a platform for some 600 bigger and smaller events across the City of New York, led by people and organisations that support climate action.

Over the years, many influential leaders have participated in Climate Week NYC, including New Zealand Prime Minister Jacinda Ardern as well as the Presidents of Haiti, Peru and the Marshall Islands. John Kerry, US Secretary of State, Tim Cook, CEO of Apple and Christiana Figueres, Executive Secretary of UNFCCC have also joined the Opening Ceremonies. In 2023, many notable figures, including Jane Fonda, Governor of Maryland Wes Moore, and Razan Al Mubarak, current President of the International Union for Conservation of Nature, spoke during the event.

Previous event partners include Saint-Gobain, McKinsey Sustainability and Google, as well as Intersectional Environmentalist and the Youth Climate Justice Fund.

In 2020, Climate Week NYC turned into a virtual event due to the global Covid-19 coronavirus pandemic and was the largest climate summit to take place that year. In a keynote opening address, King Charles said, "Without swift and immediate action, at an unprecedented pace and scale, we will miss the window of opportunity to 'reset' for... a more sustainable and inclusive future."

In 2023, Climate Week NYC took place from September 17–24. The Hub Live brought together 1,857 of the most influential leaders from business, government, and the climate sector. The year’s theme was We Can. We Will. Over 580 events were held, with over 6,500 attendees from 96 countries, both in person and virtually. Climate Week NYC stated the event's media reach was 6.9 billion, the largest Climate Group summit to date.

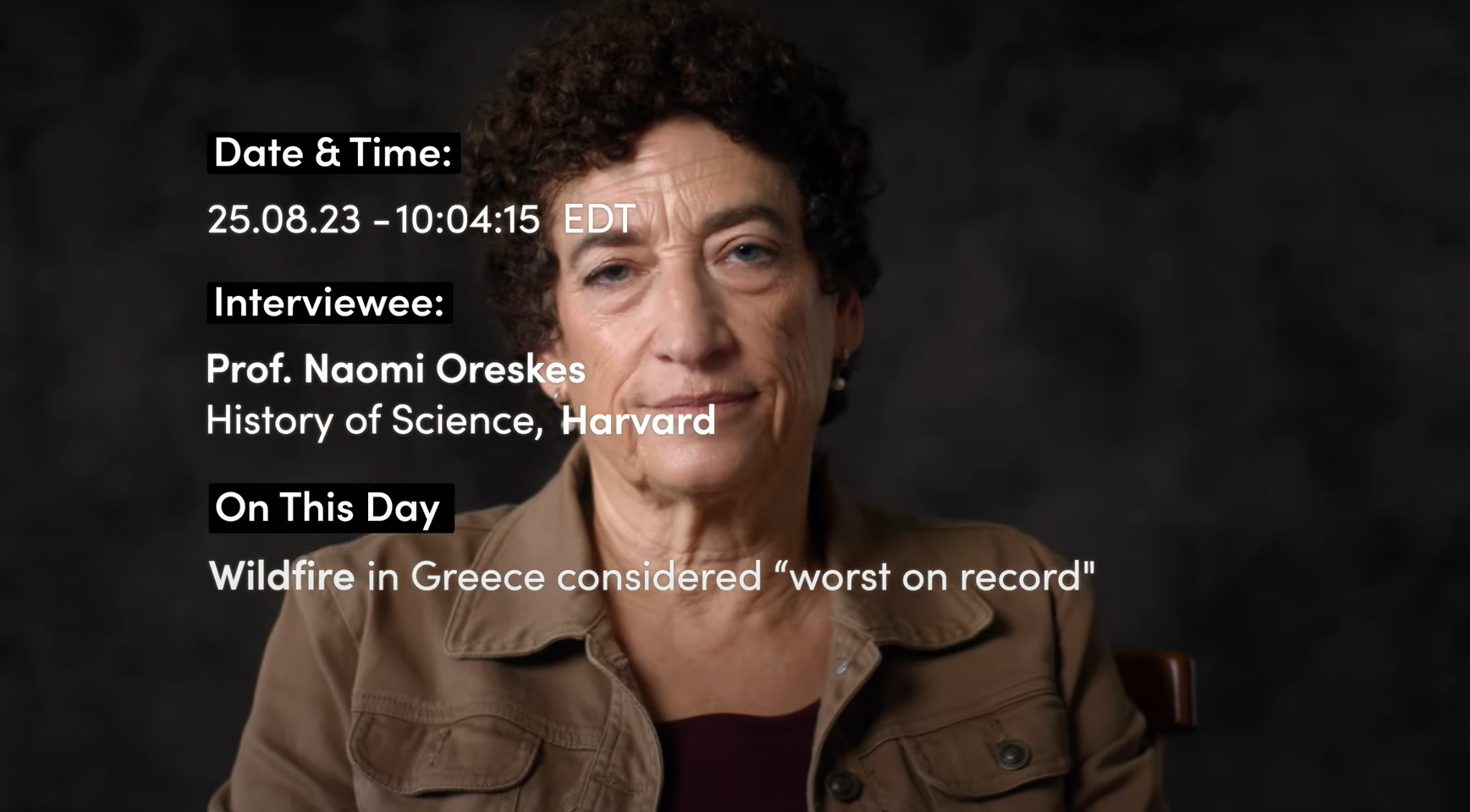

Climate Group’s short film, Facing The New Reality, was premiered at the 2023 Climate Week NYC Opening Ceremony and was shortlisted for a Smiley Charity Film Award in 2024.

In 2024, Climate Week NYC will run from September 22–29. The strapline of the 2024 Climate Week NYC is: It’s Time.

== Events ==
Each year, Climate Week NYC launches with an opening ceremony featuring major announcements, discussions, and interviews with international leadership from business, government, and the climate community. In 2021, Governor Kathy Hochul announced two major green energy infrastructure projects to power New York City with wind, solar and hydropower projects from upstate New York and Canada. Major participants have included Tim Cook, Richard Branson, John Kerry, Christiana Figueres, Jane Fonda, Bill Gates, Prince Charles, Jacinda Adern, the Hon. Chris Bowen, Kristalina Georgieva, Kathy Hochul, and Dr. Ngozi Okonjo-Iweala. The week was officially designated “Climate Week” by New York Governor Kathy Hochul in 2022.

In 2023, 566 climate leaders from 37 countries, and representatives from 362 companies attended the opening ceremony in New York, with thousands joining online.

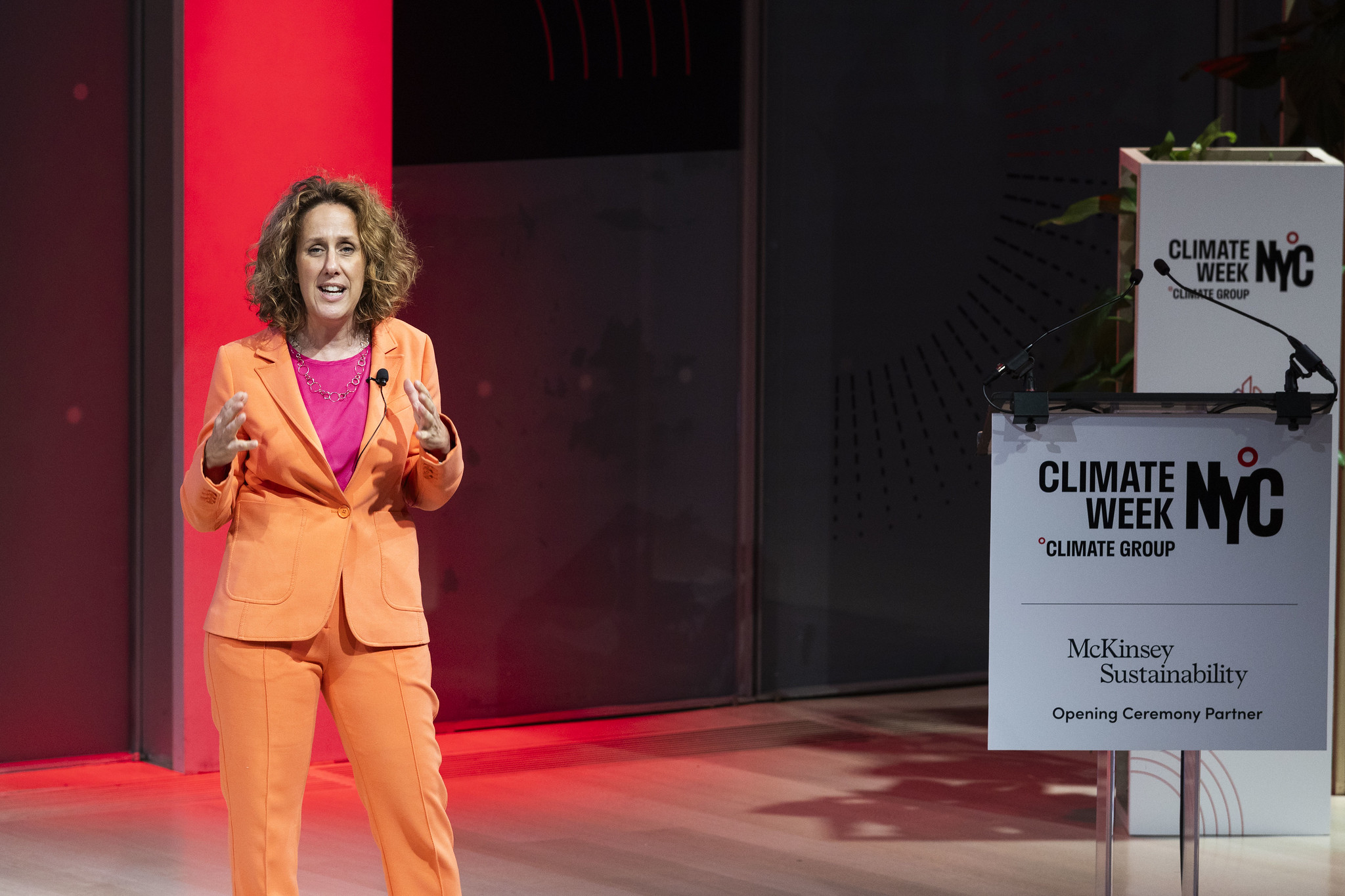
Helen Clarkson at Climate Week NYC 2023

Governor Gavin Newsom of California announced at a press conference during the opening ceremony that the state would be taking big oil companies to court for decades of misinformation. He also announced he would sign a bill which compels companies to disclose their emissions.

COP28 President-Designate Sultan Al Jaber and UN Special Envoy Michael Bloomberg used the focus on climate action during Climate Week NYC to announce the first COP-hosted ‘Local Climate Action Summit’.

Over 250 major companies and nonprofit organisations, including Climate Group, urged world leaders to commit to tripling renewable energy capacity by 2030 ahead of COP28 in Dubai.

=== The Hub Live ===
The Hub Live was launched in 2018 and hosts a series of sessions where participants discuss and collaborate on how to best drive climate action. In 2023, The Hub Live welcomed more than 2,000 business, policy, NGO, and civil society leaders to sessions across four content streams.

Speakers have included: Former president of Colombia, Nobel peace Prize-recipient and member of The Elders Juan Manual Santos; Governor Gavin Newsom, Governor of California; Abbie Dillen, President, Earthjustice; Werner Hoyer, President of the European Investment Bank; and Sophia Kianni, Founder and Executive Director, Climate Cardinals.

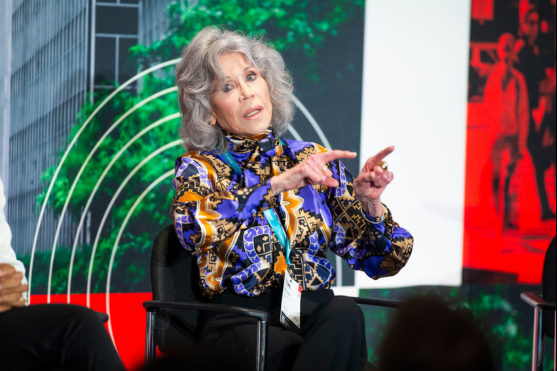
Jane Fonda at Climate Week NYC 2023

In 2023, actress and climate activist Jane Fonda took to the stage for a flagship session on phasing out fossil fuels, stating “It’s too late for incrementalism. There’s no time left for politeness. We have to stand up and be brave.”

=== The Hub Live Executive series ===
An invite-only and closed-door event, the Executive Series gathers senior policy makers, influential business leaders and civil society champions to freely discuss challenges and opportunities across a range of climate-related issues, through roundtable discussions. These sessions include The Masterclass Series, which convene solutions-focused workshops of up to 50 people to tangible outcomes and build capacity, knowledge, and collaborative networks to accelerate the transition within the green economy.

=== 10 Things campaign ===
In 2018 to mark the ten-day countdown to Climate Week NYC a ten things campaign (1. travel, 2. fashion, 3. food, 4. water, 5. plastic, 6. lighting, 7. health, 8. electric vehicles, 9. recycling, 10. getting involved) was launched to raise awareness of how the public can engage in tackling climate action. The campaign included a city-wide marketing drive, with over 3,000 sites across five boroughs of New York City taking part.

=== Taking it to the streets ===
In 2023, supported by JCDecaux and NYC Tourism + Conventions, Climate Week NYC highlighted local action in New York by creating a major outdoor advertising campaign featuring Broadway Green Alliance, Junk Kouture, The NYC Agriculture Collective, Oliver Scholars, and Headline Partner Saint-Gobain.

=== Event program highlights ===
Climate Week NYC in 2023 brought together a record breaking 585 separate events as part of the wider week. The events covered ten main themes: Built Environment, Energy, Environmental Justice, Finance, Food, Industry, Nature, Policy, Sustainable Living and Transport.

The week provides a platform for a number of major activations aimed at engaging the wider public to take climate action. This has included partnering with major late night talk shows for “Climate Night”; including The Late Late Show, with James Corden, Late Night with Seth Meyers, Late Night with Jimmy Fallon and Full Frontal with Samantha Bee. In 2023, Global collective Projecting Change put on a light show above the East River with 1,000 drones lighting New York City green at the start of Climate Week NYC. Over the years, Climate Week NYC has also hosted a series of artistic and cultural activations such as the “Climate Clock” in Union Square and partnered with the Global Citizen festival in Central Park.

Climate Group partnered with Newlab to host a climate festival, bringing together event hosts from across the five boroughs to share ideas, collaborate and promote what action they were taking. The organisation's long-time partner Junk Kouture hosted an event at the Parsons School of Design, featuring an exhibition of recycled couture designs, models, opening words from Climate Group, and a discussion on sustainable fashion.
