= Fight Like Apes and the Mystery of the Golden Medallion =

Studio album by Fight Like Apes
- Released: (Republic of Ireland) 26 September 2008 (United Kingdom) 26 January 2009 (Japan) 22 April 2009
- Recorded: 2008
- Genres: Alternative rock, karate rock, punk rock
- Length: 38:35
- Labels: Model Citizen Records; Sony Music Entertainment Japan
- Producer: John Goodmanson

Fight Like Apes chronology
David Carradine is a Bounty Hunter Whos Robotic Arm Hates Your Crotch (2007)	Fight Like Apes and the Mystery of the Golden Medallion (2008)	The Body of Christ and the Legs of Tina Turner (2010)

Singles from Fight Like Apes and the Mystery of the Gold Medallion
- 1. "Something Global" Released: 2008; 2. "Lend Me Your Face" Released: 2008; 3. "Jake Summers" Released: 19 September 2008; 4. "Tie Me Up with Jackets" Released: 2009

Fight Like Apes and the Mystery of the Golden Medallion is the debut studio album of Fight Like Apes. It was released in Ireland on 26 September 2008, the UK on 26 January 2009 and Japan in April 2009.

The album charted in the top ten of the Irish Albums Chart upon its release, at #9. It was nominated in the Best Irish Album category at the 2009 Meteor Awards, as well as for the Choice Music Prize in the same year. Fight Like Apes and the Mystery of the Golden Medallion was named 31st best album of the decade by Phantom FM at the end of 2009.

== Recording ==
The band spent a month in Seattle, Washington, in early 2008, recording tracks for the album, produced by John Goodmanson. The album title was inspired by a 1980s Mr. T cartoon. The episode was called “Mystery of the Golden Medallions” and followed Mr T as he coached an Olympic gymnastics youth team.

The album was released on 26 September 2008 on Model Citizen Records, selling continually well in Ireland and the UK. It was preceded by the release of the single "Something Global" on 11 July 2008. Fight Like Apes played a sold-out launch show at Whelan's in Dublin, which was broadcast live on Phantom FM on the day of release.

== Reception ==
Professional ratings
Review scores
Source	Rating
AllMusic	3.5/5 stars
AltSounds	(80%)
BBC	(not rated)
CLUAS	(not rated)
entertainment.ie	4/5 stars
RTÉ	3/5 stars
Sputnikmusic	4/5 stars
Sunday Tribune	4/5 stars

The Irish Times described the album as an "astonishing debut that encompasses melancholy and whimsy (both lyrically and musically). The Irish Independent, on the other hand, "strongly urge[d] all not to waste their money" on "the woeful debut" of a band with "lots of blogger and media friends, all aurally challenged". These blogger friends responded to the criticism of the band but the band's frontwoman, MayKay, remains unbothered by criticism as long as the album is simply being reviewed. RTÉ also gave the album a lukewarm response. Neil Dunphy, writing in the Sunday Tribune, said producer John Goodmanson had "managed to capture Fight Like Apes' red hot live energy on record".

In the UK press NME awarded the album 7/10 and described it as "Relentlessly pilfering the brightest parts of post-hardcore synthery, cartoon punk and sugar-rush twee, these totally hinge-free magpies have built a nest from shards of Enter Shikari, Test Icicles and Le Tigre and then thrashed the shiny fuck out of it." The album also received 8/10 in Rocksound and "4 flies" in The Fly.

In October 2008, Sony Music Entertainment Japan signed the band for the Asian release of Fight Like Apes and the Mystery of the Golden Medallion. It was released in Japan in April 2009.

It was released in the UK on 26 January 2009.

== Track listing ==
All tracks are written by Fight Like Apes.

No.	Title	Length
1.	"Something Global"	3:50
2.	"Jake Summers"	3:54
3.	"Tie Me Up with Jackets"	2:35
4.	"Digifucker"	3:25
5.	"Lend Me Your Face"	1:54
6.	"Battlestations"	3:53
7.	"Do You Karate?"	2:31
8.	"Megameanie"	0:08
9.	"I'm Beginning to Think You Prefer Beverly Hills 90210 to Me"	3:23
10.	"Lumpy Dough"	3:20
11.	"Recyclable Ass"	2:30
12.	"Snore Bore Whore"	4:37
Total length:		38:35

UK (bonus tracks)
No.	Title	Length
13.	"Lightsabre Cocksucking Blues"	2:01
14.	"Knucklehead"	1:57
15.	"Telephone The Real Ham Jackson"	6:04
16.	"Canhead"	2:10
17.	"This Is Like The Time Jody Didn't Know What Cunnilingus Was"	1:06
Total length:		49:27

== Personnel ==
- MayKay - Synth, vocals
- Pockets - Synth, vocals
- Tom - Bass
- Adrian - Drums
- John Goodmanson - Production
- Zoran Orlic - Photography

== Chart performance ==
Fight Like Apes and the Mystery of the Golden Medallion reached the top five of the Irish Albums Chart, meaning the band became the first alternative act from Ireland to achieve this for several years.

Chart	Peak position
Irish Albums Chart	5

== Awards ==
=== Choice Music Prize ===
Fight Like Apes and the Mystery of the Golden Medallion was nominated for the Choice Music Prize in January 2009. The award was won by Jape for the album Ritual on 4 March 2009.

Year	Nominee / work	Award	Result
2009	Fight Like Apes and the Mystery of the Golden Medallion	Irish Album of the Year 2008	Nominated

=== Meteor Music Awards ===
Fight Like Apes and the Mystery of the Golden Medallion was nominated at the Meteor Music Awards in 2009, in the category of Best Irish Album.

Year	Nominee / work	Award	Result
2009	Fight Like Apes and the Mystery of the Golden Medallion	Best Irish Album	Nominated
