= Soulé (singer) =

Irish pop singer-songwriter

SOULÉ
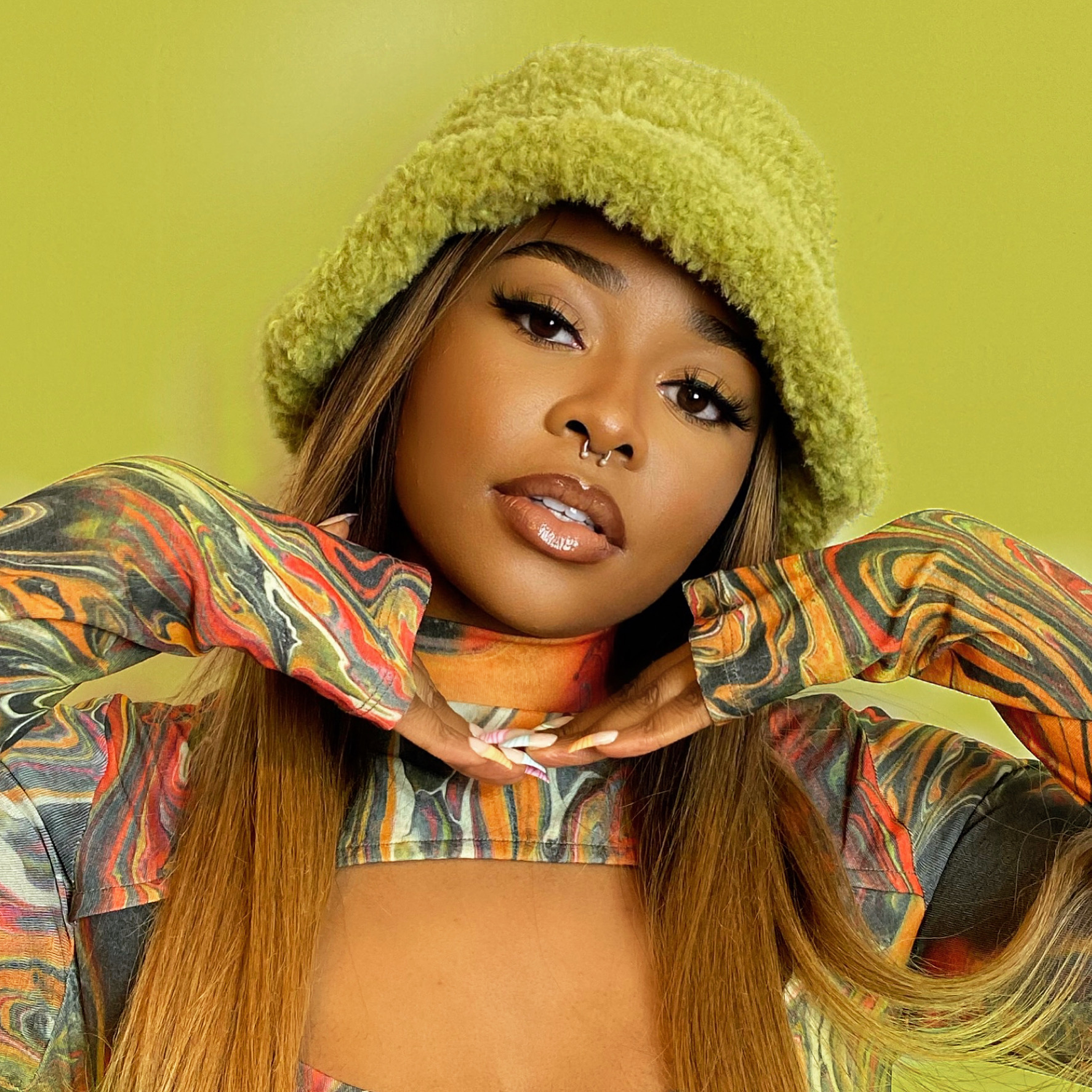
- Soulé in 2022

Background information
- Born: 4 January 1995 (age 31); London, England
- Origin: Balbriggan, Ireland
- Genres: R&B; pop
- Years active: 2017–present
- Formerly of: Irish Women in Harmony
- Website: Official website

Samantha Kay, known professionally as Soulé (Stylised as SOULÉ, born 4 January 1995), is an Irish singer-songwriter who was born in London but raised in Dublin.

== Early life ==
Soulé was born Samantha Kay in London, England to Congolese parents from the Democratic Republic of the Congo. The family moved to Ireland and settled in Balbriggan, County Dublin when Soulé was 12. She attended the Loreto school in Balbriggan. She auditioned for The X-Factor in the UK at age 16, but did not progress through to the television show. In her early years, she was involved in music and performing arts in the Foróige youth club in the town, and was mentored by Messiah J. She was involved in organising the Nitrogen music festival in the town. She received a degree in Tourism from the Dublin Institute of Technology.

== Career ==
Soulé's singing was spotted online by a Dublin musician, Precious, in 2015 and she was invited to feature on a song he was recording at an experimental production house in Dublin. This is the studio in which Soulé has produced all of her music. She released her first single, "Love No More", in September 2016. Her music has been described as "fun R'n'B", taking inspiration from the genre in the 1990s.

Her singles "Love No More" and "Troublemaker" were nominated for the Choice Music Awards' Song of the Year in 2017 and 2018 respectively. Her single "Love Tonight" featuring C Cane, was played on each episode of Love Island in 2019. This single was also nominated for the Choice Music Awards' 2019 Song of the Year and was the biggest song by an Irish female artist that same year. She was named one of RTÉ 2fm's Rising Stars in 2019.

She performed at Eurosonic in 2018, and has featured at Electric Picnic, Longitude, and Forbidden Fruit music festivals in Ireland. She was one of the acts featured at the Love Sensation festival in Royal Hospital Kilmainham, the 2fm Christmas Ball in the 3Arena, and on The Late Late Show in 2019. She regularly performs with a dj. She collaborated with Sorcha Richardson and Elaine Mai on the single "Butterflies" in 2019 as part of the Three Ireland Made by Music campaign.

In 2020, Soulé was part of an Irish collective of female singers and musicians called Irish Women in Harmony, that recorded a version of the Cranberries song "Dreams" in aid of the charity SafeIreland, which deals with domestic abuse which had reportedly risen significantly during the COVID-19 lockdown. Their version of the song received Gold status; this was Soulé's first Gold disc.

In 2022, Soulé parted ways with her management and became fully independent. Soulé released her single " Body" co-written with Irish artist Cian Ducrot at a Spotify songwriting camp. " Body" received critical acclaim and was number 1 on the Irish Breakers Chart at the same time amassing over 400,000 streams on Spotify. In April 2022, Soulé was announced as a support act for Westlife's The Wild Dreams Tour in the Aviva Stadium Alongside Sugababes. With over 50,000 in attendance, this was Soulé's biggest stage to date and she received a positive response from critics.

In 2022, Soulé was also announced as a judge on Junk Kouture a television fashion competition for secondary school students. She was on the judging panel alongside Louis Walsh, Rozanna Purcell and Stephen McLaughlin.

== Discography ==
- Love No More single (2016)
- Troublemaker single (2017)
- Good Life single (2017)
- What Do You Know single (2017)
- Don’t Hold Your Breath single (2018)
- Love Tonight featuring C Cane single (2019)
- Butterflies collaboration with Sorcha Richardson and Elaine Mai single (2019)
- Love Cycle EP (2019)
- Dreams as part of Irish Women in Harmony (2020)
- Queenish single (2021)
- Body single ( 2022)
