= Leanne Harte =

Irish singer-songwriter

Background information
- Born: Leanne Maria Harte; Dublin, Ireland
- Genres: Folk rock
- Occupations: Musician; singer-songwriter
- Instruments: Vocals; guitar
- Years active: 2012–present
- Label: True Talent Records

Leanne Harte is an Irish singer-songwriter. Born in Dublin, Ireland, Harte rose to prominence after an appearance on Irish radio RTÉ 2 at the age of sixteen. She was nominated as the "Hope for 2008" artist at the 2008 Meteor Music Awards.

== Private life ==
Harte volunteers some of her private time doing charity work. She is currently exploring other multimedia projects.

In June 2010, Harte came out as lesbian.

== Discography ==
Title	Details
Eradicaton	Released: 2003; Label: True Talent Records
Leanne Harte	Released: 2006; Label: True Talent Records
An Irish Girl in Paris	Released: 2007; Label: True Talent Records
Restless Sleepers	Released: 2013; Label: Leanne Harte/IMRO
