= This Is the Album of a Band Called Adebisi Shank =

Studio album by Adebisi Shank
- Released: 11 September 2008
- Genre: Math rock
- Label: Richter Collective
- Producer: J. Robbins

Adebisi Shank chronology
This Is the Album of a Band Called Adebisi Shank (2008)	This Is the Second Album of a Band Called Adebisi Shank (2010)

Professional ratings
Review scores
Source	Rating
AllMusic	4.5/5 stars
Sputnikmusic	4.5/5

This Is the Album of a Band Called Adebisi Shank is the first studio album by Irish math rock band Adebisi Shank. It was released on 11 September 2008 through Richter Collective.

It was recorded over the course of nine days with producer J. Robbins. Drowned in Sound wrote that the album helped "ignite a sustained fruitful period for independent guitar music in Ireland."

== Critical reception ==
AllMusic wrote that "while the album may be short in duration, the range of ideas presented here is vast: [the band] experiment constantly with varying tempos and time signatures and prefer to leave motifs underdeveloped rather than over-repetitive."

== Track listing ==
All tracks are written by Larry Kaye, Vinny McCreith and Mick Roe

No.	Title	Length
1.	"YouMe"	3:06
2.	"DODR"	3:10
3.	"Colin Skehan"	2:50
4.	"Shunk"	2:53
5.	"Mini Rockers"	3:29
6.	"Agassi Shank"	2:27
7.	"I Answer To "Doc""	2:40
8.	"Snakehips"	2:37
