= Ireland in the Eurosonic Festival =

Each year Ireland selects a number of bands and musicians to participate in the Eurosonic Festival in Groningen, Netherlands. In recent years, RTÉ 2fm, have sponsored two bands per festival.

== Ireland's entries ==
Year	Date	Artists Sponsored by 2fm	Other artists	Source
2012 (Spotlight Country)	January 11–14		Bitches with Wolves, Cashier no9, Fionn Regan, We Cut Corners, Emmet Tinley, Foy Vance, Funeral Suits, God Is an Astronaut, Hello Moon, James Vincent McMorrow, Jape, LaFaro, Lisa Hannigan, Mojo Fury, Rams' Pocket Radio, Squarehead, The Cast of Cheers, The Minutes, Thread Pulls, Toby Karr, Wallis Bird	
2011				
2010	January 14–15	And So I Watch You From Afar	Delorentos, Imelda May, Villagers	
2009	January 15—17	The Coronas, Fight Like Apes	Declan de Barra, Wallis Bird, General Fiasco	
2008	January 11—12	Cathy Davey, Republic of Loose	Halves, Si Schroeder	
2007	January—January	Julie Feeney, Humanzi	Duke Special, The Answer	
2006	January 12—13	The Chalets, The Radio	—	
2005	January 13	Hal, Iain Archer	—	
2004			—	
2003		Bell X1, The Frames	—	
2002		David Kitt	—	

Undated: Other entries have included JJ72 and Bass Odyssey.
