= This Is the Second Album of a Band Called Adebisi Shank =

Studio album by Adebisi Shank
- Released: 20 August 2010
- Genre: Math rock
- Length: 39:05
- Label: Richter Collective

Adebisi Shank chronology
This Is the Album of a Band Called Adebisi Shank (2008)	This Is the Second Album of a Band Called Adebisi Shank (2010)	This Is the Third Album of a Band Called Adebisi Shank (2014)

This Is the Second Album of a Band Called Adebisi Shank is the second studio album by Irish math rock band Adebisi Shank. It was released on 20 August 2010 through Richter Collective.

== Composition ==
The album was seen as having a more cohesive development over their previous album. The band has stated that the first album's tracks were written by individual members and then the product was finished by the group, whereas the second album was written by the three of them collaboratively. With the band describing the whole writing process as "a lot more cohesive and diverse and fun." The album features guest appearances from Conor O'Brien of Villagers and Richie Egan of Jape.

== Title and packaging ==
The album art is seen as depicting two zebras with a "Tron-style neon landscape" which is seen as aptly describing the feeling behind the album itself. The track titled "(-_-)" is named after the Japanese emoticon that translates to "meh".

Professional ratings
Review scores
Source	Rating
Absolute Punk	(89%)
Allmusic	4/5 stars
Alter The Press	5/5 stars
Oklahoma Gazette	(Favourable)
Pop Matters	(8/10)
Sputnikmusic	4/5 stars
This Is Book's Music	(Favourable)

== Accolades ==
Choice Music Prize

Year	Nominee / work	Award	Result
2011	This is the Second Album of a band called Adebisi Shank	Irish Album of the Year 2010	Nominated

== Track listing ==
All tracks are written by Larry Kaye, Vinny McCreith and Mick Roe.

No.	Title	Length
1.	"International Dreambeat"	3:51
2.	"Masa"	3:45
3.	"Genki Shank"	4:47
4.	"Micromachines"	3:37
5.	"(-_-)"	2:04
6.	"Logdrum"	6:05
7.	"Bones"	2:53
8.	"Frunk"	3:06
9.	"Europa"	3:57
10.	"Century City"	5:05
Total length:		39:05

== Charts ==
Chart (2010)	Peak position
Irish Albums Chart (IRMA)	53
