= This Is the Third Album of a Band Called Adebisi Shank =

Studio album by Adebisi Shank
- Released: 12 August 2014
- Genre: Math rock
- Label: Sargent House

Adebisi Shank chronology
This Is the Second Album of a Band Called Adebisi Shank (2010)	This Is the Third Album of a Band Called Adebisi Shank (2014)	This is the Christmas Album of a band called Adebisi Shank (2025)

Professional ratings
Review scores
Source	Rating
Allmusic	4/5 stars
The 405	3.5/5 stars
Bearded Gentlemen Music	5/5 stars
The Irish Times	4/5 stars

This Is the Third Album of a Band Called Adebisi Shank is the third studio album by Irish math rock band Adebisi Shank. It was released on 12 August 2014 through Sargent House.

== Track listing ==
All tracks are written by Larry Kaye, Vinny McCreith and Mick Roe.

No.	Title	Length
1.	"World In Harmony"	5:11
2.	"Big Unit"	4:35
3.	"Turnaround"	3:16
4.	"Mazel Tov"	3:49
5.	"Thundertruth"	2:37
6.	"Sensation"	5:14
7.	"Chaos Emeralds"	3:41
8.	"Voodoo Vision"	6:00
9.	"(Trio Always)"	1:05
