= Fight Like Apes (album) =

Studio album by Fight Like Apes
- Released: (Republic of Ireland) May 15, 2015 (United Kingdom) May 18, 2015 (Japan) May 18, 2015
- Recorded: 2012–2015
- Genres: Alternative rock, punk rock
- Length: 41:31
- Label: Alcopop! Records

Fight Like Apes chronology
Whigfield Sextape (2014)	Fight Like Apes (2015)

Singles from Fight Like Apes
- 1. "Crouching Bees" Released: May 12, 2014; 2. "Pretty Keen On Centrefolds" Released: May 9, 2015

Fight Like Apes is the third and final studio album from Irish band Fight Like Apes. It was released in Ireland on May 15, 2015, and in the UK and internationally on May 18, 2015.

The first commercial single release from the LP was "Pretty Keen on Centerfolds", released on May 9. Some of the tracks which appear on the album previously appeared on their Whigfield's Sextape EP in 2014.

== Recordings ==
The album was supported by a Fund It campaign launched in 2013. The crowdfunding campaign proved successful and was completed within a matter of days. The fund it campaign raised the required €20,000.

The crowd funding occurred due to the band and their previous label Model Citizen parting ways. After much delay the band announced the release of a new EP titled in Whigfield Sextape released on May 9, 2014 in Ireland.

== Artwork ==
The artwork for the album and singles is produced by Loreana Rushe who has previously worked on their other albums and singles.

== Track listing ==
All tracks are written by Fight Like Apes.

No.	Title	Length
1.	"I am Not a Merryman"	3:11
2.	"Crouching Bees"	3:48
3.	"Pop Itch"	2:40
4.	"The Schillaci Sequence"	3:52
5.	"Didya"	2:42
6.	"Numbnuts"	3:41
7.	"Pretty Keen on Centrefolds"	3:15
8.	"The Hunk & the Fun Palace"	3:16
9.	"I Don't Want to Have to Mate With You"	3:11
10.	"Baywatch Nights"	3:51
11.	"Maevis Beacon: Annihilation"	3:11
12.	"Carousel"	5:01
Total length:		41:31

== Personnel ==
- MayKay - Synth, vocals
- Pockets - Synth, vocals
