= The Body of Christ and the Legs of Tina Turner =

Studio album by Fight Like Apes
- Released: 27 August 2010 (Ireland)
- Recorded: 2008–2010
- Genre: Alternative rock
- Length: 42:57
- Label: Model Citizen Records
- Producer: Andy Gill

Fight Like Apes chronology
Fight Like Apes and the Mystery of the Golden Medallion (2008)	The Body of Christ and the Legs of Tina Turner (2010)	Whigfield Sextape (2014)

Singles from The Body of Christ and the Legs of Tina Turner
- 1. "Hoo Ha Henry" Released: 20 August 2010

The Body of Christ and the Legs of Tina Turner is the second album released by Irish band Fight Like Apes. It was released on 27 August 2010 in the Republic of Ireland as the follow-up to their debut album Fight Like Apes and the Mystery of the Golden Medallion.

== Background and recording ==
Pockets came up with the title. The album was recorded between touring. The album has been largely recorded in Dublin and London. The album has been produced by Andy Gill, the guitarist from Gang of Four who has worked with Futureheads, Red Hot Chili Peppers and Polysics. The Body of Christ and the Legs of Tina Turner was available for download in the United States on 25 April 2011.

== Track listing ==
All tracks are written by Fight Like Apes.

No.	Title	Length
1.	"Come On, Lets Talk About Our Feelings"	3:33
2.	"Jenny Kelly"	2:51
3.	"Pull Off Your Arms & Let's Play In Your Blood"	4:42
4.	"Hoo Ha Henry"	2:30
5.	"Katmandu (Face It, You're Caviar, I'm Hotdogs)"	2:35
6.	"Thank God You Weren't Thirsty (Lightbulb)"	4:11
7.	"Poached Eggs"	5:00
8.	"Captain A-Bomb"	3:08
9.	"Waking Up With Robocop"	4:12
10.	"Indie Monster"	2:47
11.	"H + Z5 Together At Last"	3:10
12.	"Ice Cream Apple Fuck"	4:27
Total length:		42:57

== Charts ==
Chart (2010)	Peak position
Irish Albums Chart	3
Irish Independent Albums Chart	1

== Singles ==
- The first single from the album is "Hoo Ha Henry". The single was available to download from 20 August 2010.
