= Tales of Silversleeve =

Studio album by Cathy Davey
- Released: 12 October 2007 (Ireland)
- Recorded: 2006–2007
- Genre: Alternative rock
- Label: EMI Ireland
- Producer: Liam Howe

Cathy Davey chronology
Something Ilk (2004)	Tales of Silversleeve (2007)	The Nameless (2010)

Professional ratings
Review scores
Source	Rating
Irish Independent	(A+)
Entertainment.ie	4.5/5 stars
The Irish Times	5/5 stars
RTÉ Entertainment	4/5 stars

Tales of Silversleeve is the second album released by Irish singer Cathy Davey. It was released on 12 October 2007 as the follow-up release to Davey's 2004 debut Something Ilk. The album contains eleven tracks, including the singles "Reuben", "Sing for Your Supper" and "Moving".

Tales of Silversleeve led to several award wins and nominations for Davey and her album, including a win in the Best Irish Female category at the Meteor Music Awards. There was also a Choice Music Prize nomination for Irish Album of the Year 2007. Although the album failed to chart, Davey received positive remarks from newspapers, radio stations and members of the general public alike, being described as "a bright, bold and breezy rush of imagination, creativity and sheer glorious sounds" by journalist and blogger Jim Carroll.

== Background and recording ==
Davey performed a nationwide tour in late May 2007, debuting songs from the album which at this stage was referred to as Silversleeve. All but two of the songs were recorded in her home. The album, released under the title Tales of Silversleeve, was preceded by "Reuben", its first single, on 21 September 2007. Davey explained the title choice, "I had a runny nose when I was a child and let's just say I didn't wipe it with a tissue". The album was produced by Liam Howe of Sneaker Pimps.

== Reception ==
Tales of Silversleeve received a largely positive reaction from critics and reviewers in the Irish media.

entertainment.ie reviewer Lauren Murphy described Tales of Silversleeve as "Without doubt, one of the best albums of the year", noting "there's a magic about Tales of Silversleeve that makes it an album you're almost afraid to listen to twice, in case it's not as good as you remember the first time".

Jim Carroll, rock critic with The Irish Times, called the record "The most charming pop album you’ll hear in Zero Seven".

Public service broadcaster RTÉ reviewer Harry Guerin said the album was "even more imaginative" than her debut and gave it four out of five stars.

The Irish Independent''s reviewer gave the album five stars, describing it as "a record that she can be proud of".

The Irish Times placed Davey third in a list of "The 50 Best Irish Acts Right Now" published in April 2009, saying "There's no better female songwriter in Irish music right now". Her closest female rivals on the list were Lisa Hannigan and Róisín Murphy at numbers five and seven respectively. Tales of Silversleeve was named sixth best Irish album of 2007 by John Meagher of the Irish Independent and ninth best album of the decade by Jim Carroll, Tony Clayton-Lea and Lauren Murphy of The Irish Times.

The album was certified double-platinum in Ireland.

== Track listing ==
All tracks are written by Cathy Davey.

No.	Title	Length
1.	"Sing for Your Supper"	3:44
2.	"Reuben"	4:10
3.	"The Collector"	2:51
4.	"Moving"	3:44
5.	"Mr. Kill"	4:28
6.	"Overblown Love Song"	4:17
7.	"No Heart Today"	3:41
8.	"Harmony"	2:48
9.	"Can't Help It"	4:08
10.	"Rubbish Ocean"	4:17
11.	"All of You"	3:39

== Singles ==
Tales of Silversleeve includes eleven tracks, including three singles. Ed Power of the Irish Independent described Davey's song "Reuben", a number one single, as "a skewed romantic tirade glazed in sugar-candy vocals". "Sing for Your Supper" was described by the same reviewer as Davey's "biggest smash to date". "Moving" was used in as part of advertising campaign by mobile network operator Vodafone in Ireland.

== Awards ==
Tales of Silversleeve led to several award wins and nominations for Davey and her album.

=== Choice Music Prize ===
Davey's second album Tales of Silversleeve was nominated for the Choice Music Prize in January 2008. Surprise was expressed within the Irish media when she was beaten by Super Extra Bonus Party.

Year	Nominee / work	Award	Result
2008	Tales of Silversleeve	Irish Album of the Year 2007	Nominated

=== Meteor Music Awards ===
Davey won Best Irish Female at the 2008 Meteor Awards. Tales of Silversleeve was also nominated for Best Irish Album at the same event but lost to Paddy Casey. Casey later admitted he would have preferred if Davey had won the award. Upon being embraced by and photographed alongside Sinéad O'Connor at the launch, Davey remarked on how odd it was "to put your arms around someone you don't know".

Year	Nominee / work	Award	Result
2008	Cathy Davey	Best Irish Female	Won
2008	Tales of Silversleeve	Best Irish Album	Nominated
