= Junk Kouture =

Fashion competition for students

- Junk Kouture logo
- Genre: Entertainment
- Created by: Troy Armour
- Presented by: Sean Treacy; Órla Morris-Toolen
- Judges: Louis Walsh; Rozanna Purcell; Laura Whitmore; Mehreen Baig; Nicole McLaughlin; Soulé; Ben Barry; Emma McKee; Fabio Paris; Jean-Baptiste Andreani; Lise Pierron; Matteo Ward; Sara Maino; Haifa Beseisso; Fatema Almulla; Aleena Khan; Stephen McLaughlin; Jane Leavey; Tracy Fahey
- Country of origin: Ireland
- No. of seasons: 12

Original release
- Network: RTÉ One / RTÉ2

Junk Kouture is a television fashion competition for post-primary school students, where participants design, create and model fashion, made from recycled items. The competition has run in Ireland, since it was founded in 2010, by Troy Armour. The annual Grand Finale has been held in the 3Arena, Dublin since 2015.

Junk Kouture launched in New York, London and Abu Dhabi in 2021, with competitions opening in September 2021 for each of these new cities.

In 2022, the first ever World Final was held at Etihad Arena, Abu Dhabi, and saw 53 teams designs from the UAE, France, Italy, Ireland, Britain, and USA compete to be crowned World Designer of the Year 2022. Since, it has held World Finals in Grimaldi Forum, Monaco in 2023 and The Helix, Dublin in 2024.

Previous holders of the Junk Kouture Overall Winner for 2021 include 'Iconoclastic Fantastic' – created by Alicia Röstermundt from Coláiste Bríde, Enniscorthy.

== Competition ==
=== Junk Kouture 2010-2019 ===
Junk Kouture was created in 2010 by businessman Troy Armour, from Buncrana, County Donegal. Inspired by similar initiatives being run by schools throughout Ireland, Armour explored how to bring these initiatives to a live setting with a performance aspect brought into the mix. The first edition of Junk Kouture saw the competition hold regional finals throughout Ireland, in Derry, Naas, Athlone and Clonmel, before the first Grand Final took place in the Burlington Hotel, Dublin. Judges for the first competition were a selection of local designers and hairdressers, and the first winner was Urban Armour – a design created from aluminium drinks cans and ring pulls, by Grainne Wilson from Presentation Secondary School, Clonmel.

In 2012, venue sizes were increased, with locations including the Europa Hotel, Belfast, The Crown Plaza, Blanchardstown, Hudson Bay, Athlone and The Strand, Limerick, with the Grand Final moving to the Citywest Hotel, Dublin. New judges were also brought in for the second instalment, with stylist and presenter Angela Scanlon and designer Zoe Boomer being part of the panel. Lady Data was crowned Overall Winner – a design created out of recycled computer parts including circuit boards and keyboard keys, by students from Colaiste Bride, Enniscorthy - Sarah Greene, Michaela Doyle and Kelly Bolger. This edition also saw the introduction of new prize categories including the Glamour Prize, the winners of which travelled to London to appear at the Royal Film Performance of The Hobbit: An Unexpected Journey, and to Cannes for the Cannes Film Festival.

In 2013, Junk Kouture shows were moved from hotels to theatres – Millennium Forum, Derry; The Helix, Dublin; The Royal Theatre, Castlebar; and University of Limerick's Concert Hall. Junk Kouture also moved its Grand Final to the Bord Gais Energy Theatre, Dublin for the first time. Judges included presenter Darren Kennedy and model Faye Dinsmore. Students Ceile Corbett, Annie Corbett, Shannon McCarthy from Coláiste Iosaef, Kilmallock were crowned Overall Winners with their design Ultra Violet Wash – created from clothes pegs and lint found in the filters of dryers.

In 2014, after the completion of Regional Finals, tickets went on sale for the Grand Final to be held in the Bord Gais Energy Theatre, only to sell-out in a number of hours. The demand resulted in the Grand Final being moved to the 3Arena, Dublin. X-Factor judge and music manager Louis Walsh and former Miss World Rosanna Davison joined the judging panel, whilst TV presenter Glenda Gilson took the reins as show host. Students from Our Lady's Bower, Athlone - Ruth Gallagher, Jane Wallace, Emma Kinsella were announced as Overall Winners for their design Pine-A-Colada, created from old rope, pine cones and dried pineapple.

In 2015, the competition format continued with four regional finals around Ireland, as well as the Grand Final being held in the 3Arena. There was further changes to the judging panel, with TV personality Vogue Williams and celebrity stylist Rob Condon replacing Darren Kennedy and Rosanna Davison. Roscommon-native Luke McEvoy from Elphin Community College, took home the Overall Winners prize for his design Le Paon Majestueux, made from chicken wire, old magazines, aluminium and peacock feathers. In doing so, Luke became the first male to be crowned Overall Winner of Junk Kouture.

Junk Kouture grew further in 2016, when the demand in Ireland increased to the point where a further regional final was added to the programme. This would take place in The Helix, Dublin - meaning that there would be two shows held back-to-back for the first time in one venue. Fashion Editor for Vogue India, Lorna McGee joined the judging panel for the first time, and Our Lady's Bower, Athlone picked up their second Overall Winner prize, with Jennifer Siak, Emma Clarke, Eleanor Dwyer's Jewel of the Nylon - created from recycled ladies tights - claiming the top prize. Junk Kouture was crowned Overall Event of the Year and the annual Event Industry Awards in Ireland, beating off events such as the Centenary of the Easter Rising.

In 2017, Junk Kouture launched its presence in Scotland for the first time, holding its final in the SECC, Glasgow. The winning entry Wear No Evil was created by students Ayden Bryson-Sword, Ellie Byrne and Ummi Ibrahim from St. Paul's RC Academy and was made up of old maps. The entry would then join the Irish competition for the Grand Final. Music star Una Healy from The Saturdays joined the judging panel, along with make-up artist Rhys Ellis - who would later go on to star in Netflix show Glow Up: Britain's Next Make-Up Star. Scoil Mhuire, Buncrana student Mariusz Malon picked up the Overall Winner prize with his design Enigmatic, created from a trampoline, a broken chandelier and a recycled carpet maker.

The emergence of the Beast from the East storm in February 2018 caused havoc in the Junk Kouture calendar, with the company being forced to hold four of its regional finals in The Helix, Dublin, with the South regional final going ahead in University Concert Hall, Limerick being the only survivor. The 3Arena again played host to the 2018 finalists, with Pippa O'Connor Ormond joining the judging the panel for the first time. For the third time, an entry from Our Lady's Bower, Athlone won the Overall Prize, as Mary Brody's MOO - created from 300 milk cartons and 30,000 O-rings - took home the title.

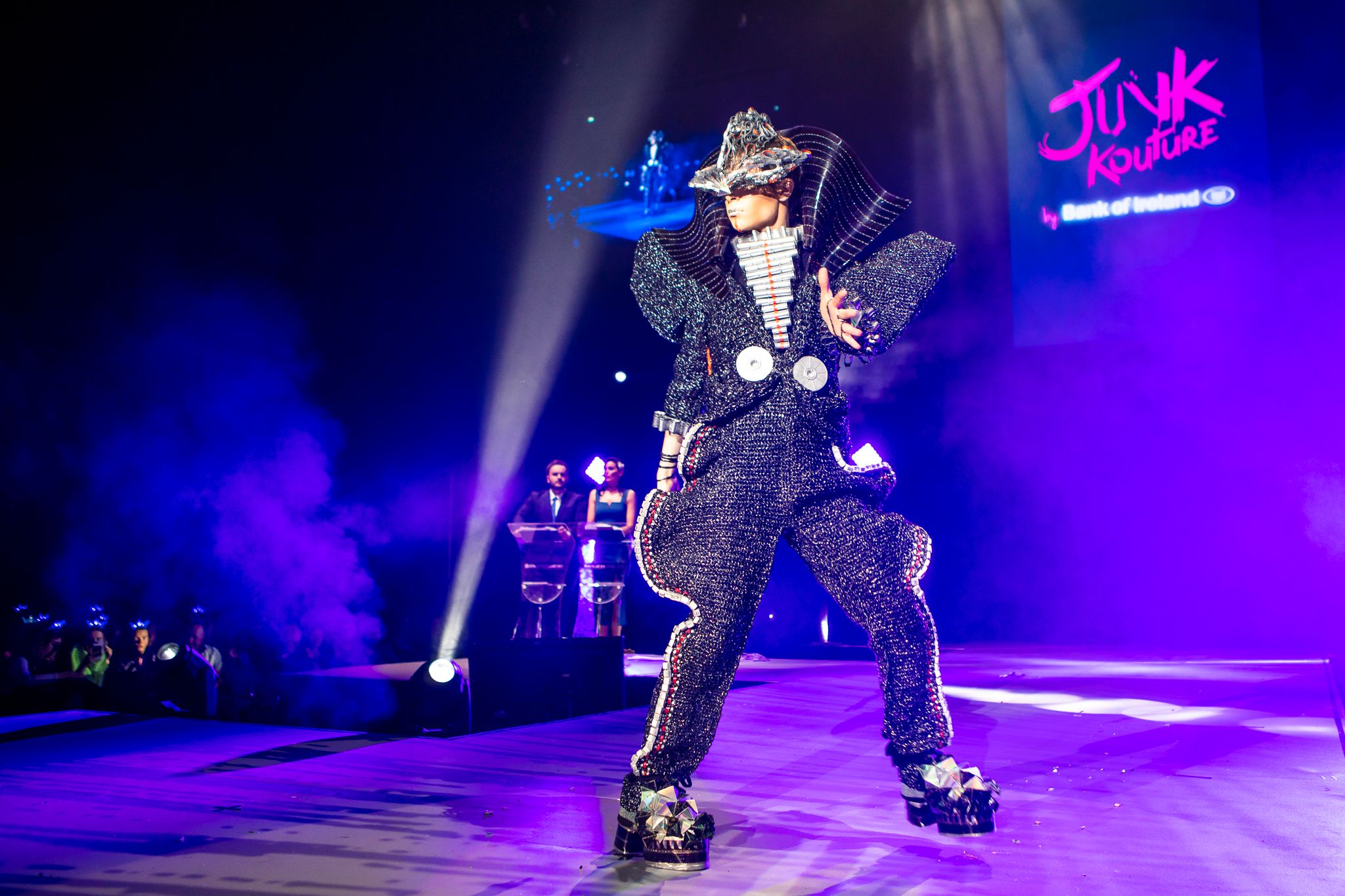
Junk Kouture 2019 winner - 'Cinematic'

Junk Kouture returned to normal in 2019, with over 4000 participants. TV presenter Doireann Garrihy joined the judging panel for the first time. With 80 Grand Finalists selected from the five regions, Maxim O'Sullivan from Pobalscoil Chorca Dhuibhne in Dingle, County Kerry was crowned Overall Winner for his design Cinematic. The design was made from old film reels, VHS tapes and DVDs, all taken from his family-owned cinema - The Phoenix. It had been Maxim's second time entering Junk Kouture, and his design went on to be showcased in Cannes during the acclaimed Cannes Film Festival, and at the Royal Film Performance of 1917 in London.

=== 2020 and the impact of COVID-19 ===
Due to celebrate its tenth edition in 2020, Junk Kouture's competition ran as normal up until March 2020, when the COVID-19 pandemic began to spread throughout Ireland. With a partnership in place with public service broadcaster RTÉ for the first time, the programme got off to an incredible start with record numbers of voters in its Lifeline and Wildcard voting processes and selling out three of its five regional finals in record time. Having completed its regional finals by the beginning of March 2020, Junk Kouture had found its 80 Grand Finalists and also engaged a new judge - RuPaul's Drag Race star Michelle Visage for the Grand Final of the competition. With the Grand Final scheduled for April 2020 in the 3Arena, Junk Kouture was forced to initially postpone the event, and then cancel it completely.

=== Move to digital and first RTÉ broadcast ===
Junk Kouture moved its competition online, piloting Summer Series - a 12-week long content campaign on Instagram - Junk Kouture, RTÉ and Dublin production company FUEL opened discussions about a televised broadcast of a reformatted Grand Final. The format would involve Junk Kouture finalists being recorded in venues in their regions in a COVID-19-compliant fashion, in a similar style to the online fashion shows of Yves Saint Laurent during lockdown. Recording took place in venues including Castle Leslie Estate, Monaghan; Gloster House, Offaly; Kennedy Rooms, Limerick; Ballybeg House, Wicklow; and Smock Alley Theatre, Dublin.

On 4 February 2021, the 2020 Junk Kouture Grand Final was broadcast on RTÉ2 - presented by RTÉ 2FM hosts Laura Fox and Emma Power, and featuring a performance from Irish singer, Aimée. Synergy - a design created from sea glass and plastic cartons by Carndonagh Community School students Brónach Harkin, Robyn O'Donnell and Orlaith Doherty.

On 9 December 2021, the 2021 Junk Kouture Grand Final was broadcast on RTÉ2, where Iconoclastic Fantastic - a design inspired by Jean-Paul Gaultier and Janelle Monáe made from seatbelts and a second-hand trouser suit, and created by German exchange student Alicia Rostermundt from Coláiste Bríde, Enniscorthy - took home the Overall Winner award.

== Format ==
Junk Kouture is a competition for post-primary school students – aged 13–18. Students must design and create an item of haute couture created from only recycled materials. To date, the concept of the event has involved participants showcasing their designs initially online through registration, then at Regional Finals, and finally in a Grand Final - typically held in the 3Arena, Dublin. Designs are judged by a panel made up of industry experts, past contestants and celebrities. Each design gets one minute on stage, performing to a song of their own choice, with performance playing as key a role as the design and craftsmanship shown in the design.

=== Regional finals ===
In Ireland, there was five regional shows: North (Derry); East (Dublin); South-East (Dublin); South (Limerick); and West (Castlebar). Fifteen designs from each final are selected for progression to the Overall Grand Final, whilst another five entrants are selected through the Wildcard process. These designs are selected by partners. In 2020, Media Partner RTÉ were responsible for the selection of the five Wildcard designs, with radio presenter and fashion guru Tara Stewart making the selections.

=== Grand final ===
In 2015, Junk Kouture moved its Grand Final event to Ireland's largest arena, 3Arena, Dublin for the first time. Since then, it has held each of its Grand Finals in the venue, attracting over 20,000 audience members in the process. The first Grand Final held in the 3Arena, was won by Le Paon Majestueux, created by Roscommon-student Luke McEvoy. In Ireland, national broadcaster RTÉ aired the 2020 Grand Final for the first time in February 2021, with a 50-minute broadcast on the RTÉ2 channel. This was subsequently followed by a further broadcast of the 2021 Grand Final in December 2021.

=== International competition ===
In 2021, Junk Kouture announced that it would hold its first ever series of international competitions in 2022. This would see the programme open in five new cities - London, New York City, Milan, Paris and Abu Dhabi. These competitions, along with the established Irish competition would then see students compete against each other in a global final in 2022.

== Judges ==
The judging panel has been made up of both industry experts and education professionals since the first edition in 2010. In most recent years, celebrity judges have been included in judging panels, with mainstay and X-Factor star Louis Walsh being joined by Rosanna Davison, Una Healy, Pippa O'Connor Ormond, Doireann Garrihy, Rob Condon, Lorna McGee and Vogue Williams since 2014. Core judges have included Stephen McLaughlin (a former Junk Kouture contestant), Tracy Fahey (Limerick School of Art & Design) and Jane Leavey (Griffith College, Dublin) since 2018. In 2020, RuPaul's Drag Race star Michelle Visage joined the programme as a judge. In 2021, upon international expansion, judges were secured for the competition in the United States - Ben Barry, (Dean of Fashion, Parsons School of Design; cross-stitch artist Emma McKee (The StitchGawd); and innovative designer, Nicole McLaughlin. In the United Kingdom, Head of Fashion at Central St Martins, Fabio Piras was joined by media personality Laura Whitmore and author Mehreen Baig on the judging panel. In Italy, Piras was joined by journalist Sara Maino (Vogue Italia) and climate activist Matteo Ward (Fashion Revolution). In France, model Lise Pierron and Jean-Baptiste Andreani (CEO, Institut Français de la Mode) were selected as judges. In UAE, businesswoman and founder of CTZN Cosmetics, Aleena Khan, influencer Haifa Beseisso and Fatema Aref Almulla (UAE Ministry of Climate Change and Environment) made up the panel. For the Ireland competition, Louis Walsh and Stephen McLaughlin were joined by author Rozanna Purcell and musician Soulé. These judges were responsible for selecting the first ever 'Top 10' from each country that would represent their nation at the Junk Kouture World Final.

== Junk Kouture winners by year ==
Year	Winner	School	Design Name	Materials
2011	Grainne Wilson	Presentation Secondary School, Clonmel	Urban Armour	Aluminium drink cans and pull tabs
2012	Sarah Greene, Michaela Doyle, Kelly Bolger	Colaiste Bride, Enniscorthy	Lady Data	Recycled computer parts including circuit boards and keyboard keys
2013	Ceile Corbett, Annie Corbett, Shannon McCarthy	Coláiste Iosaef, Kilmallock	Ultra Violet Wash	Clothes pegs and lint found in the filters of dryers
2014	Ruth Gallagher, Jane Wallace, Emma Kinsella	Our Lady's Bower, Athlone	Pine-A-Colada	Rope, pine cones and dried pineapple
2015	Luke McEvoy, Sarah Cox (model)	Elphin Community College, Roscommon	Le Paon Majestueux	Chicken wire, old magazines, aluminium and peacock feathers
2016	Jennifer Siak, Emma Clarke, Eleanor Dwyer	Our Lady's Bower, Athlone	Jewel of the Nylon	Recycled ladies tights
2017	Mariusz Malon	Scoil Mhuire, Buncrana	Enigmatic	Trampoline, a broken chandelier, recycled carpet maker
2018	Mary Brody	Our Lady's Bower, Athlone	MOO	300 milk cartons, 30,000 O rings
2019	Maxim O'Sullivan	Pobalscoil Chorca Dhuibhne, Dingle	Cinematic	Old film trailers, video tape and DVDs
2020	Brónach Harkin, Robyn O'Donnell, Orlaith Doherty	Carndonagh Community School, Donegal	Synergy	Sea glass, plastic milk cartons and smashed jam jars

=== Legal Disputes ===
In 2025, the company was involved in a legal dispute with Priya Narang. The case, Narang v. Armour et al., 24-CV-1125 (S.D.N.Y. 2025), was a breach of contract action in the United States District Court for the Southern District of New York in which Priya Narang sued Junk Kouture and its founder, Troy Armour, for $225,000 in unpaid commissions on two $500,000 Deloitte sponsorship deals. Judge J. Paul Oetken partially dismissed the case on June 3, 2025, allowing the core claims to proceed against JK Operations.
