= Jamie Keeton =

American man with skin condition (born 1968)

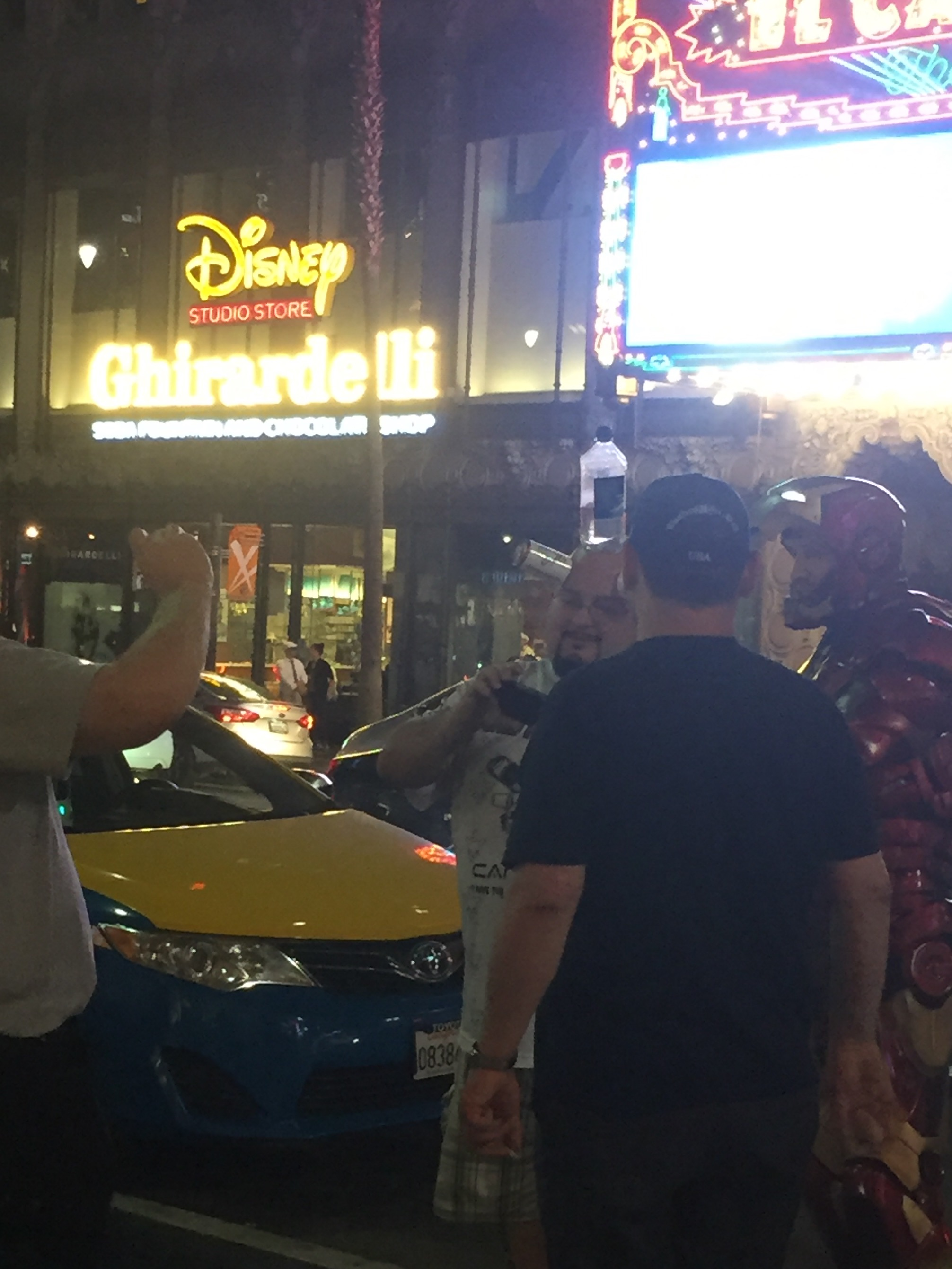
Keeton (center) in 2016

Jamie Keeton (born July 9, 1968) is an American man with a medical condition that enables objects to stick to his skin by suction. Nicknamed "Canhead", he has made a career from demonstrating his abilities, and as of 2022 holds the Guinness World Record for the most drink cans attached by air suction to the head.

== Background ==
Jamie Keeton was born on July 9, 1968. Originally from Pensacola, Florida, he lived in Chicago for about 20 years and later moved to Kenosha, Wisconsin. According to Keeton, he began to notice that his toys and other objects stuck to his body at the age of seven. He discovered the extent of his skin's ability at a baseball game, when he realized that a can from which he was drinking inadvertently became stuck to his shaved head.

Keeton's doctor determined that his skin takes in more oxygen than average, which causes his oxygen level to be 23 percent higher than average and allows non-porous objects to stick to his skin through air suction. Keeton stated that as a result of his rare medical condition he would maintain an average body temperature of 100 °F (38 °C), his burns would heal faster than a normal person's, and he had "abnormally smooth skin". The skin condition is unnamed, and in 2018 Keeton claimed to be one of four people in the world to be affected by it. Keeton's blood type is A negative and he was born prematurely. Keeton may suffer from a condition called sticky skin syndrome. His condition may also be from proteins in his sweat, or genetic conditions affecting his body temperature.

== Career ==
Keeton has built a career out of his skin condition, such as by advertising products and businesses or acting as a master of ceremonies at various events, at which he can earn "10 to 20 thousand dollars a weekend". He has appeared on television shows to demonstrate his talent, including The Ellen DeGeneres Show and The Late Late Show with James Corden. In 2016, he appeared on Nature's Weirdest Events, a nature documentary series produced by the BBC, in which Keeton was referred to as a "human–octopus hybrid guy". In 2020 he appeared on the Go-Big Show on TBS, a television show featuring extreme talents.

In 2022, Keeton was awarded the Guinness World Record for the "most drink cans placed on the head using air suction", attaching ten cans to his head for at least five seconds. He had previously set the record with eight cans in 2016, but lost it in 2019.
