= The Nameless (album) =

Studio album by Cathy Davey
- Released: 7 May 2010 (Ireland)
- Recorded: 2008–2010
- Genre: Alternative rock
- Label: Hammer Toe Records

Cathy Davey chronology
Tales of Silversleeve (2007)	The Nameless (2010)	New Forest (2016)

The Nameless is the third album released by Irish singer Cathy Davey. It was released on 7 May 2010 in Ireland as the follow-up to her 2007 second album Tales of Silversleeve. The first single from the album "Little Red" debuted on Cathy Davey's My Space page.

== Background and recording ==
Recording for the album began in spring 2008 and continued until early 2010. Villagers' Conor J. O'Brien makes a guest appearance on "Army of Tears". Promotion for the album began with an exclusive look at the artwork in Hot Press magazine. A tour of Ireland also took place in spring 2010 taking in Dublin, Cork and other major cities and towns within Ireland.

== Reviews ==
The debut single from The Nameless, "Little Red" has received positive reviews. The single was given the title of "Single of the week" by Ireland's leading music magazine Hot Press.The Irish Times said of the track that "...it may very well be the best thing she's done to date..."

== Track listing ==
1. "The Nameless"
2. "Army of Tears"
3. "In He Comes"
4. "Habit"
5. "Little Red"
6. "Happy Slapping"
7. "Dog"
8. "Bad Weather"
9. "The Touch"
10. "Wild Rum"
11. "Lay Your Hand"
12. "Universal Tipping"
13. "End of The End"

== Singles ==
- The first single from the album was "Little Red". This single was released as a download only on April 23, 2010. The video was directed by Lorcan Finnegan and was played at the 2011 SXSW Film and Music Festival.
- The second single from the album is "Army of Tears". The single also featured the b-side "The Wandering". The single was released on 16 July 2010. Davey debuted the single on "Saturday Night with Miriam".

== Charts ==
=== Album ===
Chart (2010)	Peak position
Irish Albums Chart	1
Irish Independent Albums Chart	1

=== Singles ===
Year	Single	Chart	Peak position
2010	"Little Red"	Irish Singles Chart	25
