= Something Ilk =

Studio album by Cathy Davey
- Released: 20 August 2004 (Ireland); 23 August 2004 (UK)
- Recorded: Summer 2003 (Wales)
- Label: EMI Ireland
- Producer: Ben Hillier

Cathy Davey chronology
Something Ilk (2004)	Tales of Silversleeve (2007)

Something Ilk is the debut album of Irish songstress Cathy Davey. It was released in 2004. The release date for Ireland was 20 August 2004, whilst the release date for the United Kingdom was 23 August 2004.

The album received a largely positive reaction in the Irish media. Davey later expressed her unhappiness with the album and the pressures which the record company had placed upon her.

== Background and recording ==
After four performances in Dublin, Davey went to the countryside and commenced writing the songs which would later feature on her debut album. Davey and her band recorded Something Ilk at a studio in Wales. The studio was named Rockfield Studio. Much of the recording was done during a heatwave which occurred in the summer of 2003. They remained at the studio in Wales for a period of approximately seven weeks. The recording process included sitting down in circles to make sounds and swinging doors open and shut again to create sounds. Something Ilk was produced by Ben Hillier who had previously worked with Blur and Elbow. Something Ilk was then released in 2004.

== Reception ==
Professional ratings
Review scores
Source	Rating
Hot Press	(positive)
RTÉ Entertainment	(3/5)

Public service broadcaster Raidió Teilifís Éireann's reviewer Harry Guerin said Something Ilk was "high on presence and very low on filler" and gave it three out of five stars.

Hot Press remarked, "Not only is her voice elfin, immediate and distinct the songs are also hugely compelling. They are digestible without being lightweight, austere in places without seeming detached".

The Irish Independent's Paul Byrne described Something Ilk as "one of the best Irish albums of 2004".

The BBC's reviewer Sarah Cohen gave Something Ilk four out of five circles. BBC Manchester was less pleased and left negative comments which compared the sound of the album to Cerys Matthews and Polly Jean Harvey.

== Davey's reaction ==
Cathy Davey later expressed her unhappiness with Something Ilk, saying dismissively, "I think the record company [EMI's Regal Recordings] thought I was an indie rock chick when they signed me and that album is very much other people's idea of what I should sound like. [...] I didn't have the confidence to say no to some of the things [Ben Hillier] suggested". Davey claimed not to "know my arse from my elbow when I signed for them" and "despised" performing those songs in a live arena. Despite this, the Irish Independent described her as "very talented—far more so than [Gemma] Hayes" but regretted that she had "failed to find an audience for her fine debut Something Ilk".

== Track listing ==
All tracks are written by Cathy Davey.

No.	Title	Length
1.	"Come Over"	3:29
2.	"Trade Secret"	4:46
3.	"Cold Man's Nightmare"	3:39
4.	"Clean and Neat"	2:55
5.	"Hammer Head"	4:32
6.	"Old Man Rain"	2:39
7.	"Swing It"	4:07
8.	"Yak Yak"	3:19
9.	"Go Make It"	4:18
10.	"Sugar"	5:53
11.	"Holy Moly"	5:08
12.	"Save Button"	3:45
13.	"About Time"	4:12
14.	"Mine for Keeps" (includes hidden track "Honk")	8:53
