= Adebisi Shank =

Irish instrumental math rock band

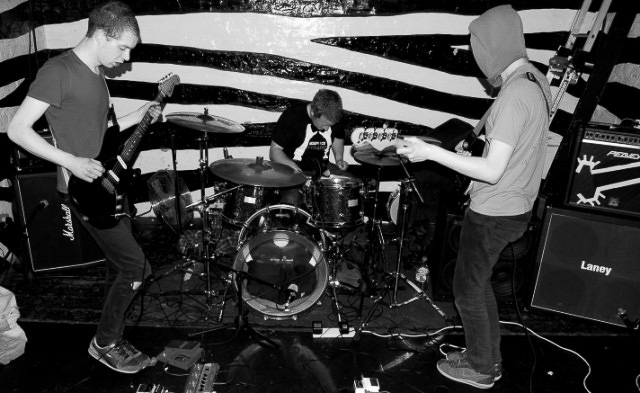
- Adebisi Shank in 2009 (from left to right; Lar Kaye, Michael Roe, Vincent McCreith).

Background information
- Origin: Fethard-on-Sea, County Wexford, Ireland
- Genres: Math rock, experimental rock, instrumental rock, electronic, dance-punk, indie rock
- Years active: 2006–2014; 2024–present
- Labels: Richter Collective, Big Scary Monsters Recording Company, Sargent House, Parabolica, Strawberry Pearls
- Members: Lar Kaye; Vinny McCreith; Mick Roe

Adebisi Shank are a three-piece instrumental rock trio from County Wexford, Ireland consisting of guitarist Lar Kaye, bass guitarist Vincent McCreith and drummer Michael Roe. The band was signed to Richter Collective in Ireland, before the record label closed in December 2012, Big Scary Monsters in the United Kingdom, Sargent House in the United States and Parabolica in Japan. Their name is a reference to the Oz character Simon Adebisi. Their style of music was described as "seriously upbeat math-rocky craziness". In September 2014, the band announced their breakup, with each member pursuing different paths. They released three studio albums and one extended play in their career. In September 2024, the band announced they are reuniting and recording new material and planned new tours.

== History ==
=== 2006 - 2014 ===
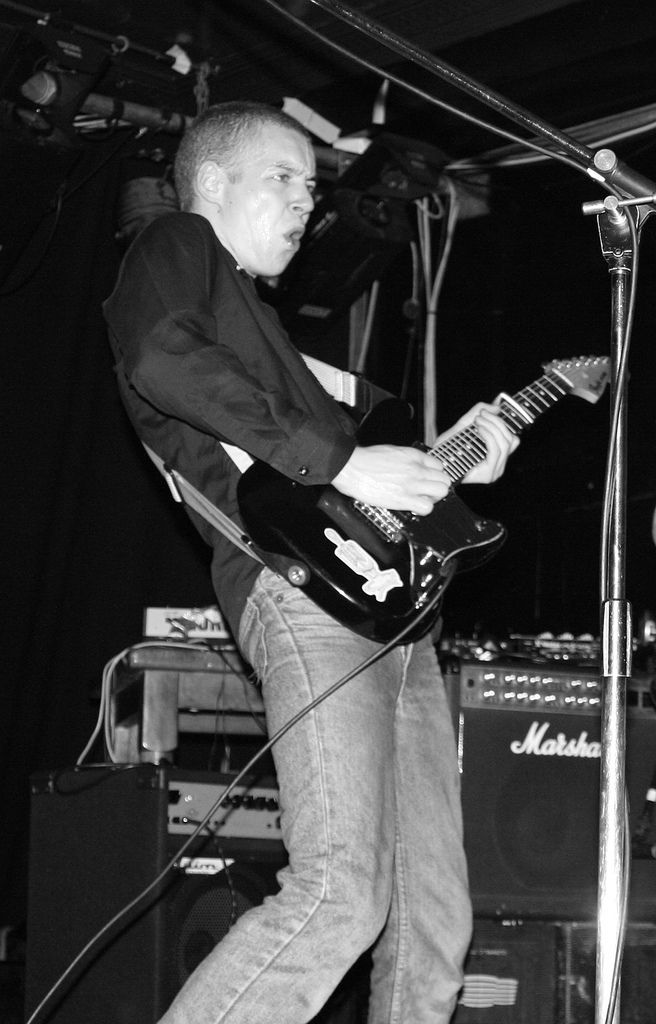
Adebisi Shank's founding guitarist Larry Kaye

The band formed in August 2006, after both drummer Mick Roe and guitarist Lar Kaye, who worked together in math rock band Terrordactyl, collaborated with bass player Vinny McCreith, who at the time worked on a solo chiptune project named The Vinny Club. The group's name, which derives from the Oz character Simon Adebisi, was picked by guitarist Larry Kaye when they needed a name quickly. Not long after their formation, in July 2007, the band released their first EP, titled This is the EP of a band called Adebisi Shank. They released the EP on DIY label Armed Ambitions and this led to the band later in 2007 touring across continental Europe with Marvins Revolt.

In early 2008 they toured Japan, supporting LITE and the EP's release on their new Japanese label, Parabolica.

In 2010 they were also nominated for a Choice Music Prize and played in Vicar Street in front of a sold-out crowd. They lost to Two Door Cinema Club's debut album Tourist History.

For the release of their second album, the band signed to US label and management company Sargent House, offering North American label support and worldwide management. This signing is significant for the band as they have always had a desire to tour the United States; however, they only wanted to do it if they could find a record label to support them. Prior to the release of their second studio album, in 2010, the band played a 14-date tour across the Republic of Ireland and Northern Ireland, including festival appearances at Indiependence, Castlepalooza, Off The Cuff and Glasgowbury. In 2011 the band won Best Album, Best Rock Act and Best Design at The Digital Socket Awards 2011, a music awards show organized by Irish music bloggers.

In late 2012, Kaye revealed that he had formed an electropunk supergroup trio called No Spill Blood. The band was formed with members from other bands like Hands Up Who Wants To Die?, Elk, and Magic Pockets and released their debut EP on 31 July 2012.

Across July 2012 the band engaged on a New Tunez tour which went across Ireland, which gave the band an opportunity to debut and perform new, unreleased material.

On 18 September 2013, the band announced the completion of their upcoming third album, which was released on 12 August 2014 to positive reviews from fans and critics alike. On 24 September of the same year, the band announced they would be breaking up after a last overseas tour.

=== Hiatus 2014 - 2024 ===
In the intervening years, Kaye and McCreith continued in the music business: Kaye played with his other band All Tvvins, while McCreith did production and mixing work, as well as composing for video games. McCreith also released music as a solo artist under the name VMC Sound and as one-half of the duo Speed of Snakes. Roe, on the other hand, served as a business lecturer at Dublin music college BIMM.

=== 2024 - present ===
On 30 September 2024, a decade following their initial split, the band posted a message to their socials that read simply: "This is the return of a band called Adebisi Shank. New songs. New gigs."

In August 2025 the band released a four-track EP entitled This is the Second EP of a Band Called Adebisi Shank. It features guitarist Yvette Young from the band Covet.

In December 2025 the band released a Christmas album entitled This is the Christmas Album of a band called Adebisi Shank with all proceeds donated to Irish Artists For Palestine (IAFP), which raises funds for medical and humanitarian aid in Gaza and supports art in Palestine. The album features vocals from MayKay on Christmas Time Is Here.

== Characteristics ==
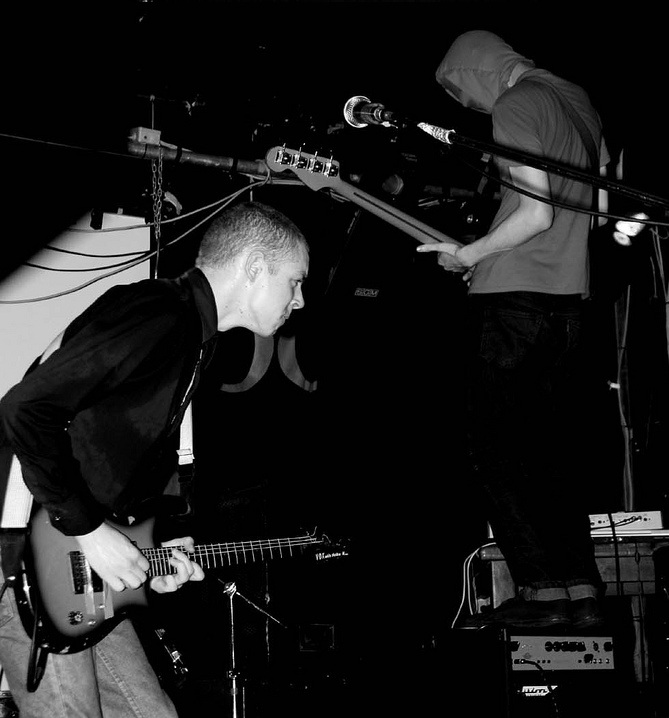
Bassist Vincent McCreith (right) is known for wearing a mask at live performances

=== Musical style ===
Adebisi Shank have a style of music described as "seriously upbeat math-rocky craziness" and have self-described themselves as robot-rock. Allmusic describes them as fusing "frenetic hardcore-influenced math rock with the epic scope of post-rock, the freewheeling intensity of heavy metal, and the dancefloor-shredding sensibilities of electronic dance music." Despite being an instrumental band the group uses distorted vocal effects in songs, treating their voices as if they are a part of their musical ensemble, with the band stating they would never use "clean vocals" in their music. The band incorporates several different instruments into their ensemble, utilising: guitars, drums, synthesizers, marimbas, horns, vocoder, percussion ensemble and "musical instruments we're not sure have even been invented yet."

The band's style has been compared to math rock bands such as Don Caballero and Battles, as well as also having their style compared to the "triumphant guitar harmonies of Fang Island with the mathematic precision of Battles, the genre-surfing playfulness of Daft Punk and churning intensity of Health." The band's influences are diverse, ranging through several different genres, including: Prince, Leonard Cohen, Radiohead, Oingo Boingo, Nirvana, Delicate Steve, Queen, Thin Lizzy, Paul Simon, Justice, Andrew WK, Jamie Lidell, Caribou, Vangelis, Steely Dan, Thomas Dolby, Arthur Russell, The Beach Boys, Smashing Pumpkins, Talking Heads, My Bloody Valentine, Fleetwood Mac, Steve Reich, Debussy, Enya, Tangerine Dream, OutKast, Lindsey Buckingham, Burt Bacharach, Paul McCartney, Le Butcherettes, The Brecker Brothers, R. Kelly, Éric Serra, and Michael Jackson.

=== Live performances ===
Adebisi Shank live performances have been described typically as relentless. A significant part of both the band's image and live performances is the bass player Vincent McCreith wearing a mask. The mask covers his entire face and resembles a scarf. When asked in an interview about the purpose of the mask McCreith commented saying: "I’d hate for the band to become famous purely because of the bass players rugged good looks and deep blue eyes."

== Members ==
- Lar Kaye – guitar (2006–2014)
- Vincent McCreith – bass guitar (2006–2014)
- Michael Roe– drums, percussion (2006–2014)

== Discography ==
=== Studio albums ===
Year	Album details	Peak chart positions
Year	Album details	IRL
2008	This Is the Album of a Band Called Adebisi Shank: Released: 11 September 2008; Label: Richter Collective, Big Scary Monsters; Formats: 10" Vinyl, CD, Download	—
2010	This Is the Second Album of a Band Called Adebisi Shank: Released: 20 August 2010; Label: Richter Collective, Big Scary Monsters; Formats: 12" Vinyl, CD, Download	53
2014	This Is the Third Album of a Band Called Adebisi Shank: Released: 12 August 2014; Label: Sargent House; Formats: TBC	—
2025	This Is the Christmas Album of a Band Called Adebisi Shank: Released: 12 December 2025; Label: None; Formats: Download	—
"—" denotes a title that did not chart.

=== Extended plays ===
Year	Album details	Peak chart positions
Year	Album details	IRL
2007	This is the EP of a band called Adebisi Shank: Released: 7 July 2007; Label: Richter Collective; Formats: CD, Download	—
2025	This is the Second EP of a band called Adebisi Shank: Released: 15 August 2025; Label: Self released; Formats: Vinyl 10"	—

== Awards and nominations ==
Choice Music Prize

Year	Nominee / work	Award	Result
2011	This is the Second Album of a band called Adebisi Shank	Irish Album of the Year 2010	Nominated

The Digital Socket Awards

Year	Nominee / work	Award	Result
2011	This is the Second Album of a band called Adebisi Shank	Best Album	Won
2011	Adebisi Shank	Best Rock Act	Won
2011	Featured artworks, posters and website	Best Design	Won
