= Whigfield Sextape =

EP by Fight Like Apes
- Released: May 12, 2014
- Genre: Alternative Rock
- Length: 13:11
- Label: Alcopop! Records

Fight Like Apes chronology
The Body of Christ and the Legs of Tina Turner (2010)	Whigfield Sextape (2014)	Fight Like Apes (2015)

Whigfield Sextape is a 4 track EP from the Irish alternative rock group Fight Like Apes. This is the band's first release since 2010's The Body of Christ and the Legs of Tina Turner

== Track listing ==
No.	Title	Length
1.	"Crouching Bees"	3:51
2.	"Bwah!"	3:35
3.	"Tyson"	3:35
4.	"The Hunk & The Fun Palace"	3:18
Total length:		14:13
