= Elaine Mai =

- Born: 1985 (age 40–41)
- Origin: County Mayo
- Genres: electronic, pop
- Years active: 2011–present
- Website: https://elainemai.com

Elaine Mai is a songwriter, musician, and producer from County Mayo, Ireland, now based in Dublin. Mai has been referred to as "one of Ireland's top electronic music producers" by RTÉ Radio One and Today FM. In January 2022, her debut album Home was shortlisted for the Choice Music Prize.

== Career ==
Mai played with the Galway indie rock band Go Panda Go while studying sociology, history and politics at NUIG. Her debut solo EP, Dots, was released in 2012 by Strange Brew Records. Later that year she appeared at the Big Top of the Galway Arts Festival, opening for Lisa Hannigan and James Vincent McMorrow. In 2015, She began collaborating with Irish artists such as Daithí Ó Drónaí, MayKay, and Le Galaxie, which brought her wider national attention. In 2020, Mai took part in Irish Women in Harmony's charity single, a cover of Dreams by The Cranberries which reached number 15 on the official Irish charts and raised over €250,000 for anti-domestic violence charity SAFE Ireland. Her debut album, Home, was released in October 2021. Lead single No Forever (feat. MayKay) was listed as one of the Top 10 tracks of 2021 by the Irish Independent, and has received significant national radio play in Ireland.

== Discography ==
=== Albums ===
- Home (2021)
- For Us (2025)

=== EPs ===
- Dots (2012)
- The Colour of the Night (2017)

=== Singles ===
- IOU (2011)
- Softly (2011)
- EDC (2014)
- Heartbeat (2020)
- Somewhere Else (2020)
- No Forever (feat. MayKay)
- Blackbirds & Thrushes (2026) with Beoga

== Awards and nominations ==
=== Choice Music Prize ===
Year	Nominated Work	Award	Result
2022	Home	Album of the Year	Nominated

Year	Nominated Work	Award	Result
2022	No Forever (feat. MayKay)	Song of the Year	Nominated
