= Cathy Davey =

Irish singer-songwriter (born 1979)

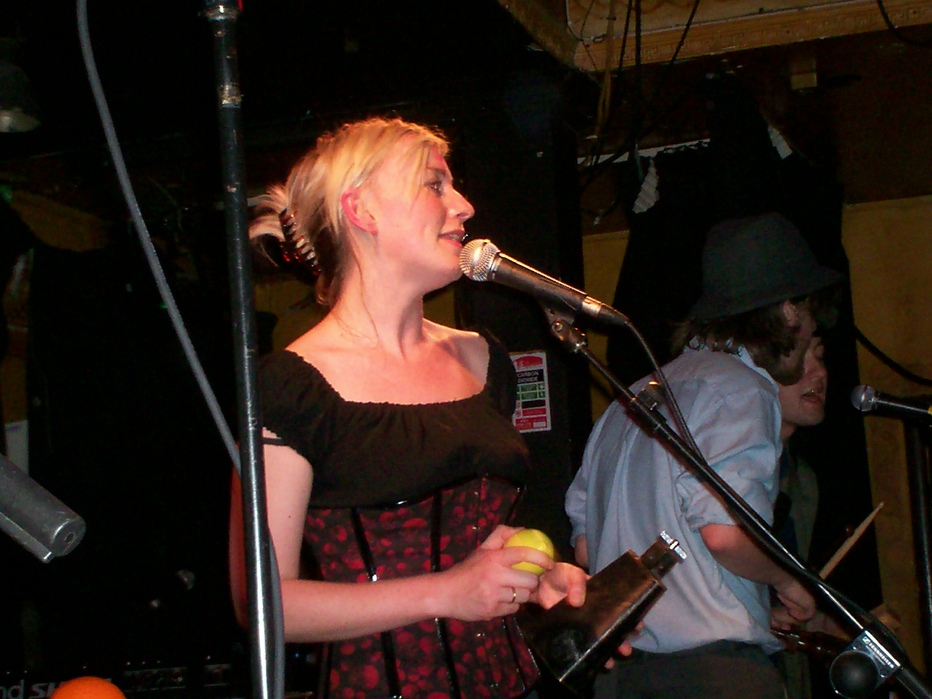

Background information
- Born: 1979 (age 46–47); Dublin, Ireland
- Origin: Dublin, Ireland
- Genre: Alternative rock
- Occupation: Singer-songwriter
- Instruments: Guitar, piano, drums, keyboards,
- Years active: 2003–present
- Label: Regal Recordings (2003–2008)
- Website: cathydavey.ie

Catherine Davey (born 1979) is an Irish singer-songwriter. She has released one extended play, "Come Over" (2004), and four albums, Something Ilk (2004), Tales of Silversleeve (2007), The Nameless (2010) and New Forest (2016). Her second album garnered her a 2007 Choice Music Prize nomination and the 2008 Meteor Award for Best Irish Female and spawned a number of successful singles, including "Reuben", "Moving", and "Sing for Your Supper". The Nameless was the top selling album in Ireland upon the week of its release. It was also nominated for the Choice Music Prize.

Davey has performed at several international events, including representing Ireland at the Eurosonic Festival in Groningen, Netherlands, and performing at the South by Southwest festival in Austin, Texas. She has also performed at other large exhibitions and festivals in Ireland, including Electric Picnic, Indie-pendence and The Music Show. Davey has worked with Autamata, Elbow and The Duckworth Lewis Method as well as providing support for Graham Coxon, R.E.M. and Supergrass. She appears prominently on the 2016 album Foreverland by The Divine Comedy.

The Irish Times placed Davey third in a list of "The 50 Best Irish Acts Right Now" published in April 2009, saying "There's no better female songwriter in Irish music right now". Tales of Silversleeve was named sixth best Irish album of 2007 by John Meagher of the Irish Independent and ninth best album of the decade by Jim Carroll, Tony Clayton-Lea and Lauren Murphy of The Irish Times.

== Background ==
Davey was born in Dublin, daughter of composer Shaun Davey and sculptor Agnes Conway. At the age of ten she moved with her mother to Wiltshire, where they lived for several years. On their return to Dublin they settled in Monkstown. where Davey spent the rest of her teenage years. The first live performance Davey attended was An Emotional Fish with The Stunning on St Stephen's Green. She initially intended to be an artist and to develop her interest in music in her leisure time but the offer of a record deal changed that.

== Style ==
Davey has been referred to as "Ireland's Björk". The comparison caused the Irish Independent's Ed Power to comment in one 2009 review: "Alas, such comparisons are probably inevitable when your favourite mode of communication is an ethereal yelp and your songs are populated with a raggle-taggle of yearners, outsiders and freaks". His colleague John Meagher opined, "you won't see Björk heft a guitar half so diligently". Hot Press compared the music on Something Ilk to the works of PJ Harvey and Nina Hynes. The magazine's reviewer also compared her to Joni Mitchell after one 2007 show in Cork. Davey's second album, Tales of Silversleeve, based its sound on the rhythm of the drums. Notable fans of Davey's music include broadcaster Síle Ní Bhraonain. Her records have achieved platinum sales.

Davey was initially uncomfortable with being described as a singer-songwriter but is now more accepting of the term. She describes her songwriting style:

I write in short quick spurts of manic creativity, which are followed by spells of borderline writer's block where the writing comes really painfully and laboriously. I’m sure it's a universal experience for anyone who writes, but it's difficult to get out of, you can't just wish it away—it just disappears when it's had enough. It’s completely independent of whether I’m happy or blue, up or down. It tends to lift as soon as I stop fixating on it—I remember thinking my house was the problem, and I'd need to go to France in order to write, and I would have been scared without Rex [her dog]. I got through it. You can't chase the muse, or you'll scare it away.

== Career ==
Cathy Davey first came to be known as a backing vocalist alongside Carol Keogh for Ken McHugh's project Autamata. McHugh and Davey subsequently collaborated on what Hot Press described as "a mixture of otherworldly indie and soft space age melodica". Davey signed to EMI/Parlophone in 2003 in a deal which Hot Press later described as having "eclipsed even the high-profile signing of The Thrills". Her rise had been low-profile; she did not perform live until she had signed her record deal. Her four-track debut EP, "Come Over", released in 2004, and in which she "swoops and yelps her way through proceedings with her distinctive voice", was described by the magazine as "inviting comparisons with others before deciding that she'd rather be completely unique if it's all the same with you".

Davey's debut album, Something Ilk, was recorded at a studio in Wales, produced by Ben Hillier whose previous credits included Blur and Elbow, and released in 2004. RTÉ reviewer Harry Guerin said it was "high on presence and very low on filler" and gave it three out of five stars. Hot Press remarked, "Not only is her voice elfin, immediate and distinct the songs are also hugely compelling. They are digestible without being lightweight, austere in places without seeming detached". The Irish Independent's Paul Byrne described it as "one of the best Irish albums of 2004". Davey performed a nationwide tour in September 2004. She also supported Graham Coxon and Supergrass during tours they undertook that year. The singer later dismissed Something Ilk, saying "I think the record company [EMI's Regal Recordings] thought I was an indie rock chick when they signed me and that album is very much other people's idea of what I should sound like. [...] I didn't have the confidence to say no to some of the things [Ben Hillier] suggested". Davey claimed not to "know my arse from my elbow when I signed for them" and did not like performing those songs in a live arena. Despite this, the Irish Independent described her as "very talented—far more so than [Gemma] Hayes" but regretted that she had "failed to find an audience for her fine debut Something Ilk".

Davey performed a nationwide tour in late May 2007, debuting songs from her follow-up album which she initially referred to as Silversleeve. All but two of the songs were recorded in her home. The album, released under the title Tales of Silversleeve and produced by Liam Howe of Sneaker Pimps, was preceded by "Reuben", its first single, on 21 September 2007. Davey explained the title choice, "I had a runny nose when I was a child and let's just say I didn't wipe it with a tissue". This proved to be a successful move as it led to a Choice Music Prize nomination for 2007 Irish Album of the Year. RTÉ reviewer Harry Guerin said it was "even more imaginative" than her debut and gave it four out of five stars. entertainment.ie reviewer Lauren Murphy described the record as "Without doubt, one of the best albums of the year", noting "there's a magic about Tales of Silversleeve that makes it an album you're almost afraid to listen to twice, in case it's not as good as you remember the first time". The Irish Independent''s reviewer gave the album five stars, describing it as "a record that she can be proud of". Jim Carroll, The Irish Times rock critic, called it "The most charming pop album you'll hear in Zero Seven".

After a series of residencies, Davey embarked on a pre-Christmas tour of Ireland in 2007. She appeared on the seventh series of Other Voices in early 2008. The singer represented Ireland at the Eurosonic Festival in Groningen, Netherlands, in January 2008. She performed at Childline Rocks in February 2008, followed by a performance at the South by Southwest festival in Austin, Texas in that March. Davey was dropped by her record company in mid-2008 alongside most of their client list. She headlined the Main Stage at Cork X Southwest in Skibbereen in July 2008. In August 2009, she headlined the Eurocultured Festival in Dublin's Smithfield Plaza and also performed at that year's Indie-pendence. Davey appeared at Electric Picnic 2008. She featured at The Music Show in the RDS in October 2008. The singer performed in Dublin's Iveagh Gardens during events to celebrate Africa Day on 25 May.

Davey's song "Moving" has been used in a prominent Vodafone commercial in her native Ireland. Another song, "Sing for Your Supper", was described by the Irish Independent's Ed Power as "her biggest smash to date". The same reviewer described Davey's song "Reuben", a number one single, as "a skewed romantic tirade glazed in sugar-candy vocals".

Davey's third album, The Nameless, was released on 7 May 2010 (Ireland), with contributions from Conor J. O'Brien and Neil Hannon. Lead single "Little Red" was released on 21 April 2010 and followed by an Irish tour in May. Davey performed on The Late Late Show on 23 April 2010. She performed at Oxegen 2010 in July. On 16 July 2010, to promote the second single from The Nameless album, Davey released a download only EP for "Army of Tears". The EP features three tracks: the original track "Army of Tears", a previously unreleased track "The Wandering" and a demo version of "Army of Tears".

Davey's fourth studio album New Forest was released on 9 September 2016. The first track revealed from the new album was 'The Pattern'.

Davey performed 'Chrysocoma' on RTÉ One's The Late Late Show on 23 September 2016.

=== Other appearances ===
Davey has appeared on the Autamata track "Cloud Seekers", taken from the album My Sanctuary. She has worked with Elbow. She dueted with Gavin Glass on the track "Rag Doll". She sang a song called "Cannonballs" on a 2005 CD titled Faction One, released by record label Faction. She appears on the David Turpin track "Red Elk". She lent her vocals to the 2008 charity album Even Better Than the Disco Thing, on which she performed a cover of Donna Summer's "I Feel Love". Tony Clayton-Lea recommended the song be downloaded alongside Lisa Hannigan's cover version of "Upside Down". She performed guest vocals on the track "The Sweet Spot" from The Duckworth Lewis Method's eponymous album and three tracks on Bang Goes the Knighthood, Neil Hannon's 2010 album as The Divine Comedy. She also supported R.E.M. during their Live Rehearsal shows at the Olympia Theatre, Dublin in summer 2007. Davey hosted Songs That Scare Children at the Spiegeltent during the Dublin Fringe Festival in September 2008. Her music is available to download from the PlayStation SingStore. She was involved in efforts to raise funds in the aftermath of the 2010 Haiti earthquake. Davey's song 'Rescue' has been used in the ABC TV series The Gates. Her song 'Holy Moly' is played at the end of The Disappearance of Alice Creed.

=== 2016 - 2020 ===
In summer 2016, Davey confirmed a new album was due for release in autumn 2016, this was preceded by the first new single 'The Pattern' released on 15 July 2016. 'New Forest' reached No. 5 in the Irish Album Chart in September 2016.

She went on to launch a charity called My Lovely Horse Rescue, which has saved the lives of hundreds of horses since its inception. The rescue has now branched off into saving pigs too with My Lovely Pig Rescue. Working on her busy farm has meant music has taken a backseat, but she continues to write, and play live in Ireland in the meantime.

== Personal life ==
Since 2009, Davey has been in a relationship with Neil Hannon of the Divine Comedy. The couple live on a farm in County Kildare. Davey is an animal lover: She and Hannon have several dogs and are patrons of the Irish animal charity My Lovely Horse Rescue. They are also patrons of My Lovely Pig Rescue, a branch of the original rescue.

== Discography ==
=== Albums ===
- Something Ilk (2004)
- Tales of Silversleeve (2007)
- The Nameless (2010)
- New Forest (2016)

== Awards ==
The Irish Times placed Davey third in a list of "The 50 Best Irish Acts Right Now" published in April 2009, saying "There's no better female songwriter in Irish music right now". Her closest female rivals on the list were Lisa Hannigan and Róisín Murphy at numbers five and seven respectively. Tales of Silversleeve was named sixth best Irish album of 2007 by John Meagher of the Irish Independent and ninth best album of the decade by Jim Carroll, Tony Clayton-Lea and Lauren Murphy of The Irish Times.

Davey won Best Pop Act at the 2011 Digital Socket Awards in Dublin.

=== Choice Music Prize ===
Davey's second album Tales of Silversleeve was nominated for the Choice Music Prize in January 2008. Surprise was expressed within the Irish media when she was beaten by Super Extra Bonus Party.

The Nameless was nominated for the Choice Music Prize in 2011.

Year	Nominee / work	Award	Result
2008	Tales of Silversleeve	Irish Album of the Year 2007	Nominated
2011	The Nameless	Irish Album of the Year 2010	Nominated

=== Meteor Music Awards ===
Davey won Best Irish Female at the 2008 Meteor Awards. Tales of Silversleeve was also nominated for Best Irish Album at the same event but lost to Paddy Casey. Casey later admitted he would have preferred if Davey had won the award. Upon being embraced by and photographed alongside Sinéad O'Connor at the launch, Davey remarked on how odd it was "to put your arms around someone you don't know".

Year	Nominee / work	Award	Result
2008	Cathy Davey	Best Irish Female	Won
2008	Tales of Silversleeve	Best Irish Album	Nominated
