= Whelan's =

Concert and events venue in Dublin, Ireland

Coordinates: 53.33664°N 6.26569°W

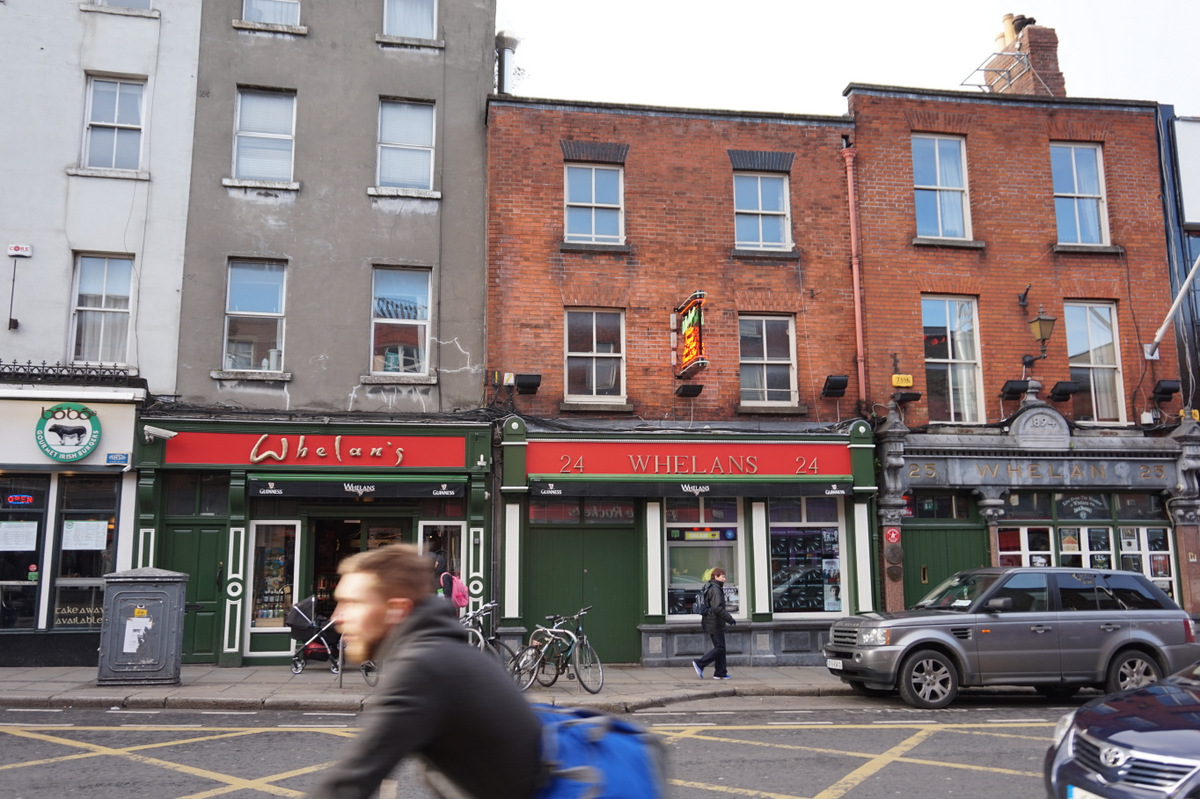
- Exterior in 2016
- Interactive map of the Whelan's area

General information
- Type: Concert and events venue
- Location: 25 Wexford Street, Dublin 2, Ireland
- Owner: The Mercantile Group

Other information
- Seating capacity: 450 standing (Main venue); 120 (Upstairs); 100 (The Parlour)

Website
- whelanslive.com

Whelan's is a pub and music venue in Dublin, Ireland.

== Profile ==
Numerous international artists have played at the venue, including Jeff Buckley, Arctic Monkeys, Bloc Party, Kate Nash, Townes Van Zandt, Damien Rice and Allen Toussaint. The pub was also the location for scenes of the movie P.S. I Love You in which the characters take a trip to Ireland. The pub is quoted in the film as follows: "Denise, take Holly to Whelan's, my favourite pub. There's beautiful music to be heard, beautiful people to be around ".

== Notable acts ==
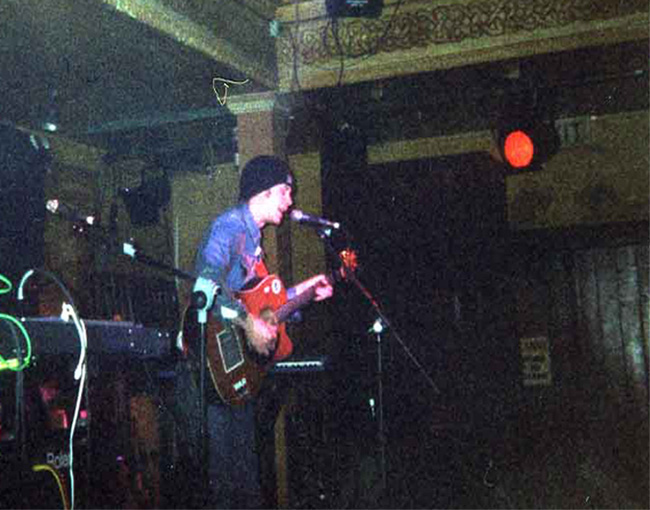
Mic Christopher performing at the venue in 2001

Many Irish and international acts have performed at Whelan's, including:

- Airbourne
- Andy Irvine & Dick Gaughan
- Arctic Monkeys
- Bloc Party
- Brave Giant
- Christy Moore
- Damien Rice
- David Kitt
- Dum Dum Girls
- Ed Sheeran
- Fight Like Apes
- Hozier
- Josh Ritter
- Kate Nash
- Mumford & Sons
- Nick Cave
- Paddy Casey
- Shed Seven
- Something Happens
- The Academic
- The Corrs
- The Cribs
- The Frames
- The Pale
- The Twang
