= MayKay =

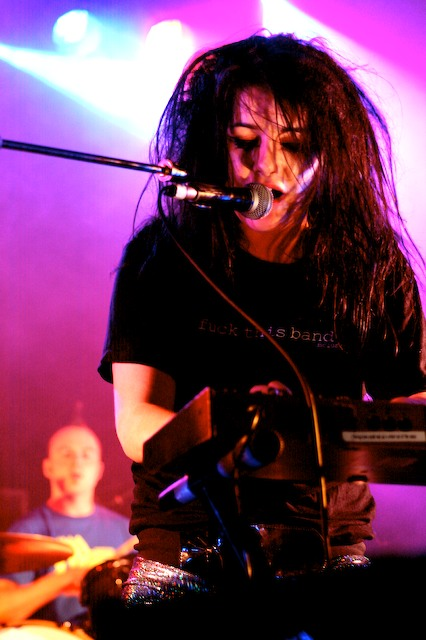

Background information
- Born: Mary-Kate Geraghty; 1986 (age 39–40)
- Genres: Karate rock
- Occupation: Musician
- Label: Alcopop! Records

Mary-Kate Geraghty, known professionally as MayKay, is an Irish musician known as the frontwoman of Fight Like Apes, with whom she has released numerous records and received several award nominations. She has also given solo performances as a DJ.

== Biography ==
A native of County Kildare, MayKay was born in 1986. She is the daughter of journalist Kathy Sheridan. Sheridan is a regular Fight Like Apes concert-goer and bought a record player specially to listen to the band's debut album on vinyl.

She was a choir singer for some time. The singer met bandmate Jamie (known as "Pockets") when the pair were vacationing in Spain during their teenage years. She spoke of their meeting in a 2007 interview with Eamon Sweeney of the Irish Independent: "One night, I told Jamie I loved singing, so he made me sign a contract on a piece of tissue in a bar saying that I would never do anything musically without him". She studied medicinal chemistry then philosophy in Trinity College, Dublin; however, she dropped out of college when Fight Like Apes began to first find success.

In 2010, MayKay and Duke Special lent their voices to an event at the National Concert Hall on 1 July 2010.

On stage MayKay dresses in either black or white and is known for her "long black hair and banshee wail". She often plays the keyboard with her head during live performances. She has also played the drill. She and most of the band members, with the exception of the drummer, are known for their consumption of alcohol. She likes bands such as Adebisi Shank, Giveamanakick, Grand Pocket Orchestra and Jape. MayKay has also collaborated with Elaine Mai on 'No Forever' (2021).

== Reception ==
Nadine O'Regan of The Sunday Business Post has described her as "easily one of the best – and most mesmerising – front women Ireland has delivered in recent times" and possessing "an air of unpredictability that means crowds will crane their necks to make sure they see as well as hear her". Today FM presenter Alison Curtis has described her as "extremely watchable, almost going into Debbie Harry territory". Lauren Murphy of entertainment.ie praised her ability to sing "pastoral as well as blow-your-eardrums-out cacophony" on the track "Snore Bore Whore". The Munster Express described MayKay as being at her "breathy vampish best" on the same track.

== Activism ==
MayKay has been actively involved in pro-Palestinian activism since 2023. During that time, she travelled to Bethlehem in the West Bank to volunteer at the ACLAÍ community gym, located within the Lajee Centre in Aida Camp. There, she conducted music and songwriting workshops with local youth, fostering cross-cultural connections through shared musical expression. In 2024, MayKay collaborated with Irish artists Elaine Mai and Faye O'Rourke, along with young Palestinian refugees from Aida Camp, to produce the charity single "We Are." The song features contributions from Palestinian children who articulate their identity and resilience through lyrics in Arabic, English, and Irish. All proceeds from the single supported the Lajee Centre's community initiatives.

MayKay is also a co-organiser of Irish Artists for Palestine (IAFP), a collective that unites Irish creatives in solidarity with the Palestinian people. Through events like "United in Song," IAFP raises awareness and funds for Palestinian causes, emphasising the role of art in cultural preservation and resistance.
