= Choice Music Prize =

Award for Irish music

- Choice Music Prize Logo (2017–present)
- Awarded for: Music from the Republic of Ireland or Northern Ireland
- Location: Vicar Street, Dublin, Republic of Ireland (2005–present); The Olympia Theatre, Dublin (2011 ceremony)
- Country: Ireland
- Presented by: IRMA, IMRO and RAAP
- First award: 2005
- Website: choicemusicprize.com

The Choice Music Prize (Irish: Duais Cheoil Choice), known for sponsorship reasons as the RTÉ Choice Music Prize is an annual music prize awarded to music from a band or solo musician who is born in the Republic of Ireland or Northern Ireland or holds an Irish passport. For bands, the majority of members must have been born on the island of Ireland or hold an Irish passport.

After being broadcast on Today FM for nearly eleven years, in November 2016, it was announced that the Choice Music Prize would broadcast on RTÉ 2fm starting in 2017. The ceremony is held in Vicar Street, Dublin. (Note: With the exception of the 2012 ceremony, which was held in the Olympia Theatre, Dublin.)

Since it first began in 2005, the main awards ceremony had been broadcast live on the Irish national radio station, Today FM, every March. (Note: With the exception of the 2014 ceremony, which took place on 27 February 2014.) It aired as a four-part special, beginning at 7pm and usually concluding at 11pm. Presenters of the main awards ceremony have included Michelle Doherty, Rigsy, and Today FM radio presenters Alison Curtis and Paul McLoone.

Since 2017, the Choice Music Prize has not had a sponsor. Before that, Samsung sponsored it in 2016, and Meteor sponsored it from 2011 to 2015.

== Establishment ==
The Choice Music Prize was established by journalist Jim Carroll and manager Dave Reid in 2005.

== Aim of the awards ==
According to organisers, the aim of the Choice Music Prize, is to get more airplay for Irish acts both domestically and overseas.

"It was a strange thing" remembers Cormac Brady of Super Extra Bonus Party. "It's not something we ever expected to happen to us. Winning awards certainly wasn't what we got into music for, but it brought us a hell of a lot more recognition overnight and opened a lot of doors". Julie Feeney concurs. "It was probably the biggest achievement of my life" she says. "It meant a phenomenal amount to me. It was an enormous validation" as an alternative to the industry-dominated Meteor Music Awards. The Choice Music Prize is modelled after the Mercury Prize which is awarded each year to the best album from the United Kingdom or Ireland. It is a music award voted for by a panel of twelve judges based on artistic merit, regardless of genre, sales, or record label. The price includes a €10,000 cheque jointly funded by the Irish Music Rights Organisation (IMRO) and the Irish Recorded Music Association (IRMA). There is no sponsorship.

Initially considered by co-founder Carroll as a "titchy little maverick event", the Choice Music Prize has gained a reputation for producing "unpredictable" winners. Winners thus far consist of one solo female performer, four bands and one solo male performer. Julie Feeney won the inaugural prize for Irish Album of the Year 2005. She was followed by The Divine Comedy, Super Extra Bonus Party and Jape, winners of Irish Album of the Year 2006, 2007 and 2008 respectively. Adrian Crowley won Irish Album of the Year 2009, while Two Door Cinema Club won Irish Album of the Year 2010.

The ceremony to announce the winner takes place at Vicar Street, Dublin in February or March each year. Originally presented by Michelle Doherty and Rigsy, and also by Alison Curtis., Today FM radio presenter Paul McLoone presented the awards since 2012, having made his debut presiding over the 2011 Choice Music Prize ceremony and was the current host or M.C.- master of ceremonies for the prize giving ceremony with the show being broadcast live since its inception on the national and independent radio station Today FM as part of a four-hour special, airing between 7pm to 10pm. In November 2016, the Choice Music Prize announced that they had partnered with RTÉ and as such, the live ceremony will be broadcast on RTÉ 2FM from 2017 onwards. The nominated acts are invited to perform in front of a live audience at the ceremony. However, some nominated acts, such as The Chalets, Fionn Regan, Snow Patrol, Lisa Hannigan, Oppenheimer, Bell X1 and Laura Izibor, have not performed in the past due to other commitments. David Holmes (musician) and The Script also did not perform when nominated, though Holmes and Danny O'Donoghue attended the ceremony. The judging panel which is composed of various members of Irish media as such as music and broadcasting are all locked in an enclosed room during the performances on the night to debate over which act ought to win with Irish journalist Tony Clayton Lea who works for the Irish Times the Chairman of the Judging Panel with Clayton Lea also tasked with helping the panel come to a decision where they all select the one musician or band who will be announced as the winner of the Prize. A secret ballot was used to decide the winner of Irish Album of the Year 2008, Ritual.

Past winners and nominees have credited the Choice Music Prize with boosting their careers. Julie Feeney described winning Irish Album of the Year 2005 as "probably the biggest achievement of my life", adding "it meant a phenomenal amount to me. It was an enormous validation". Duke Special, nominated for the first two awards, said his nomination for the inaugural award had helped raise his profile in the Irish media. Cormac Brady stated Super Extra Bonus Party's Irish Album of the Year 2007 win "brought us a hell of a lot more recognition overnight and opened a lot of doors". Nominees have doubled or trebled sales after the award has been announced. Steve Jordan was influenced by the Choice Music Prize when he set up Canada's Polaris Music Prize. Culture Ireland invited figures from the international music industry to the event that decided the Irish Album of the Year 2010.

== Broadcast ==
From its inception, the awards show was broadcast live on Today FM and a live streamed on entertainment.ie. In 2017, the awards show moved to a live broadcast on RTÉ 2FM, and highlights will continue to be shown on RTÉ2.

The event was aired live each year on Today FM in a special awards ceremony that takes place at Vicar Street which was presented by Paul McLoone and a pre-recorded show is aired on RTÉ2 television since 2015 on hosted by Bláthnaid Treacy. The event used to be streamed live on entertainment.ie and Muzu.tv until 2015.

== Sponsorship ==
It was announced on Monday 10 October 2011 that Meteor had become the official sponsor of the award, having previously sponsored the Meteor Music Awards. In the run-up to the nominees (to be announced on 11 January 2012), both the award organisers and Meteor promised to present a number of live performances showcasing what they considered some of the best albums from 2011. Meteor Choice Music Prize Presents... began on 1 November 2011 with a live performance by Snow Patrol at Dublin's Button Factory, and was followed by a live performance from Lisa Hannigan and James Vincent McMorrow on 8 December 2011, also in Dublin's Button Factory.

In 2016, Samsung came on board to be the official partner of the awards show. However, from 2017 the awards show will be supported by RTÉ online, on radio and on television.

== Categories ==
The Choice Music Prize is awarded in five categories:

- Irish Album of the Year
- Irish Song of the Year
- Irish Artist of the Year
- Irish Breakthrough Artist of the Year
- Irish Classic Album of the Year

== Winners and shortlisted nominees ==
=== Irish Album of the Year ===
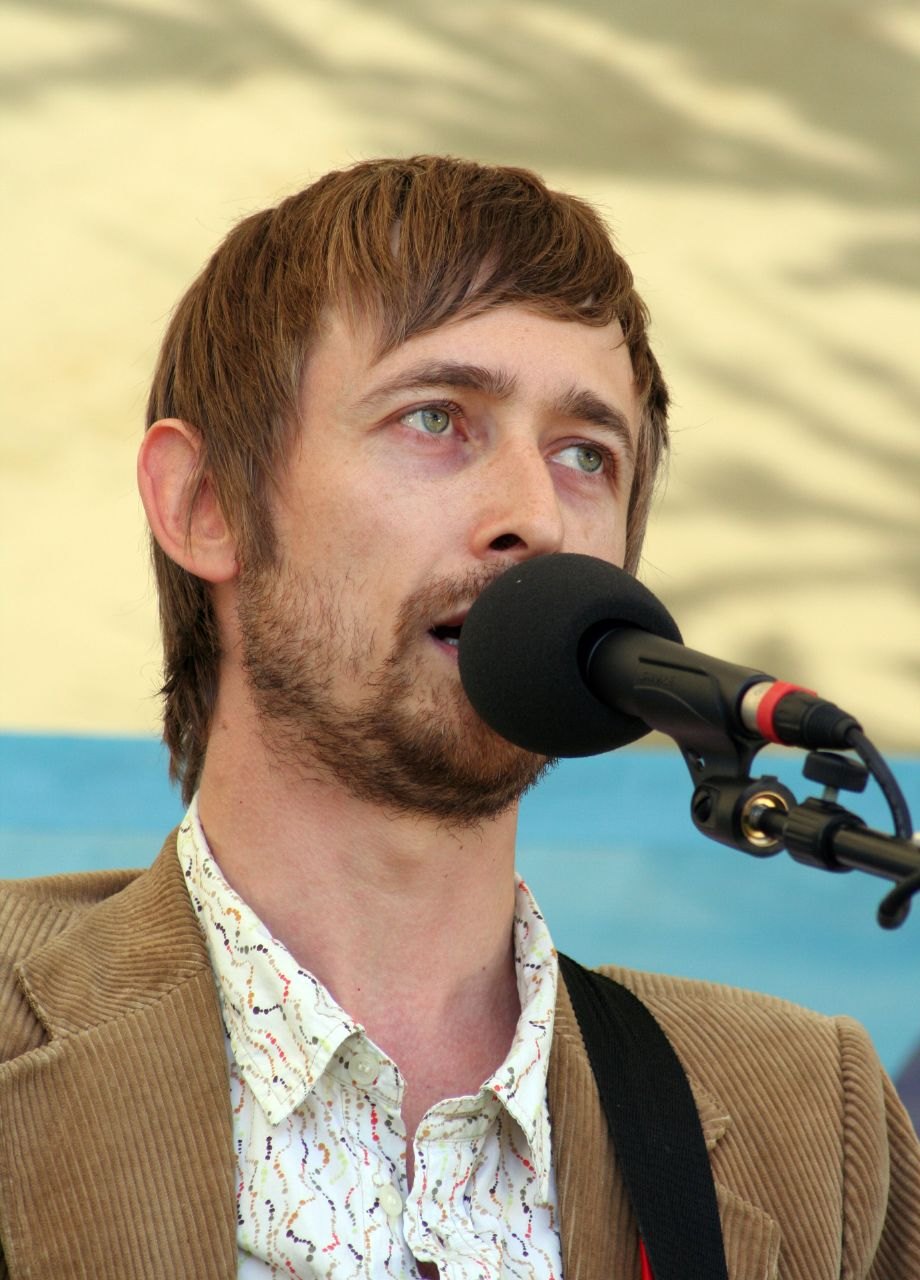
Neil Hannon, winner with The Divine Comedy in 2006

Super Extra Bonus Party, winners in 2007

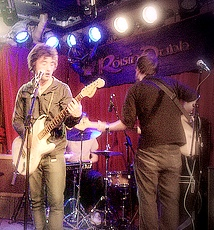
Jape, winners in 2008 and 2011

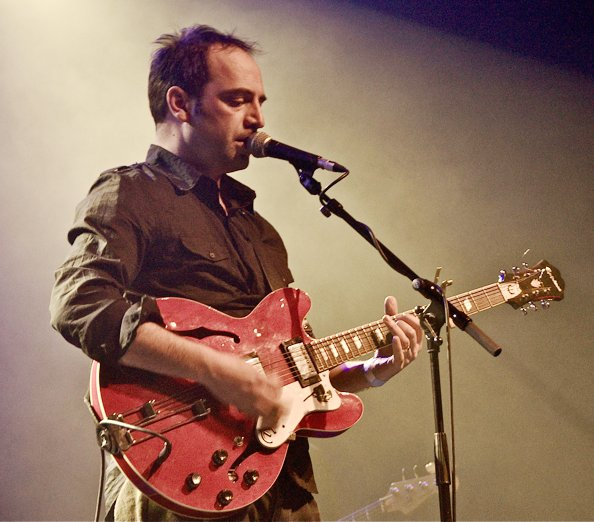
Adrian Crowley, winner in 2009

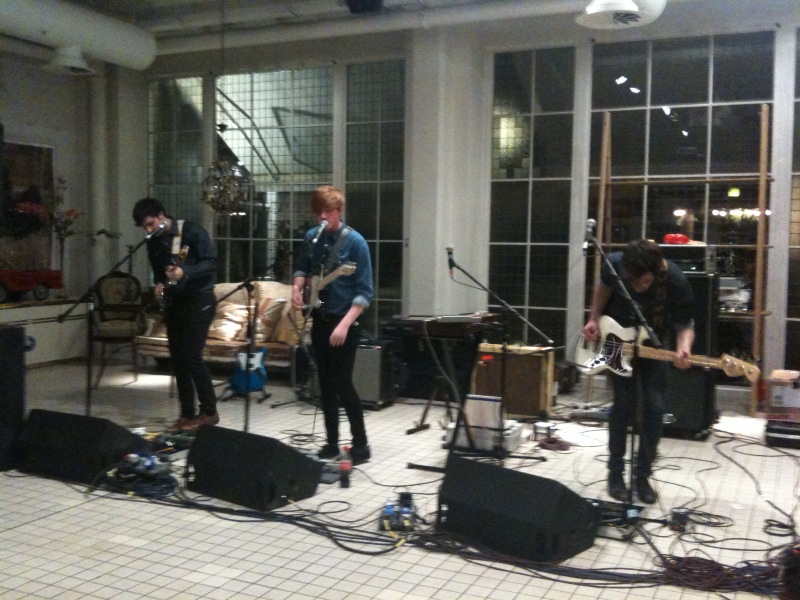
Two Door Cinema Club, winners in 2010

Delorentos, winners in 2012

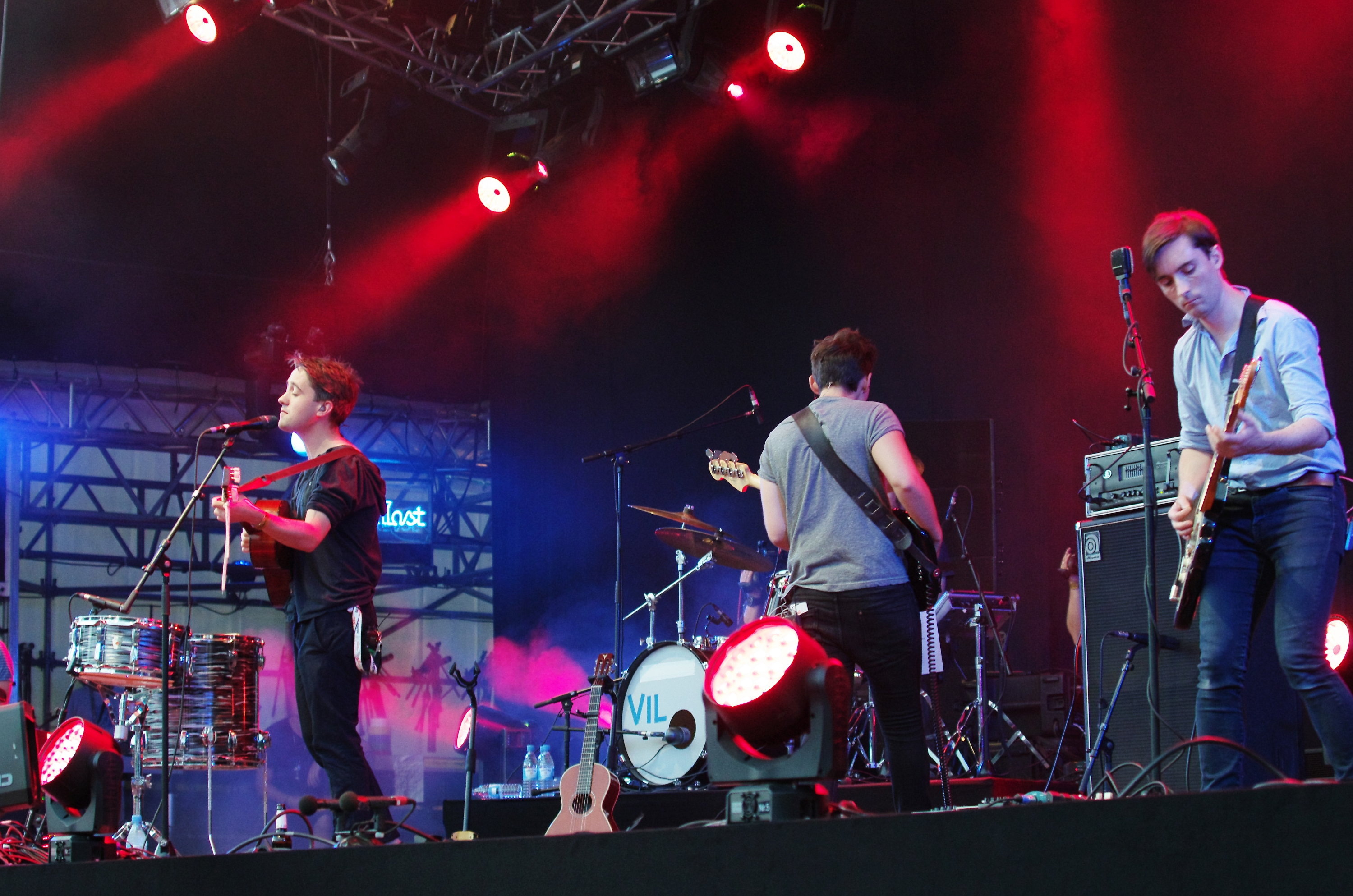
Villagers, winners in 2013

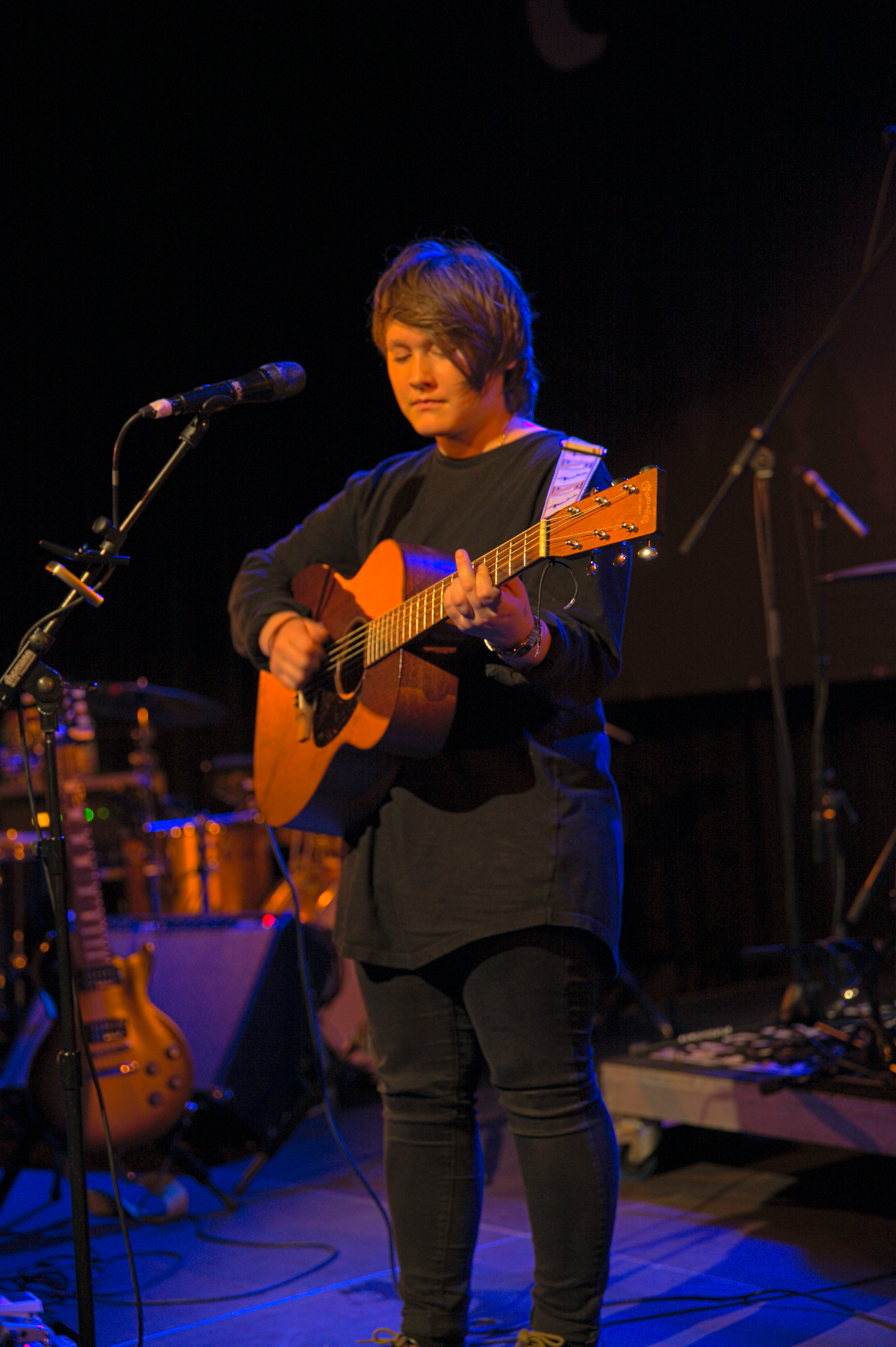
SOAK, winner in 2015

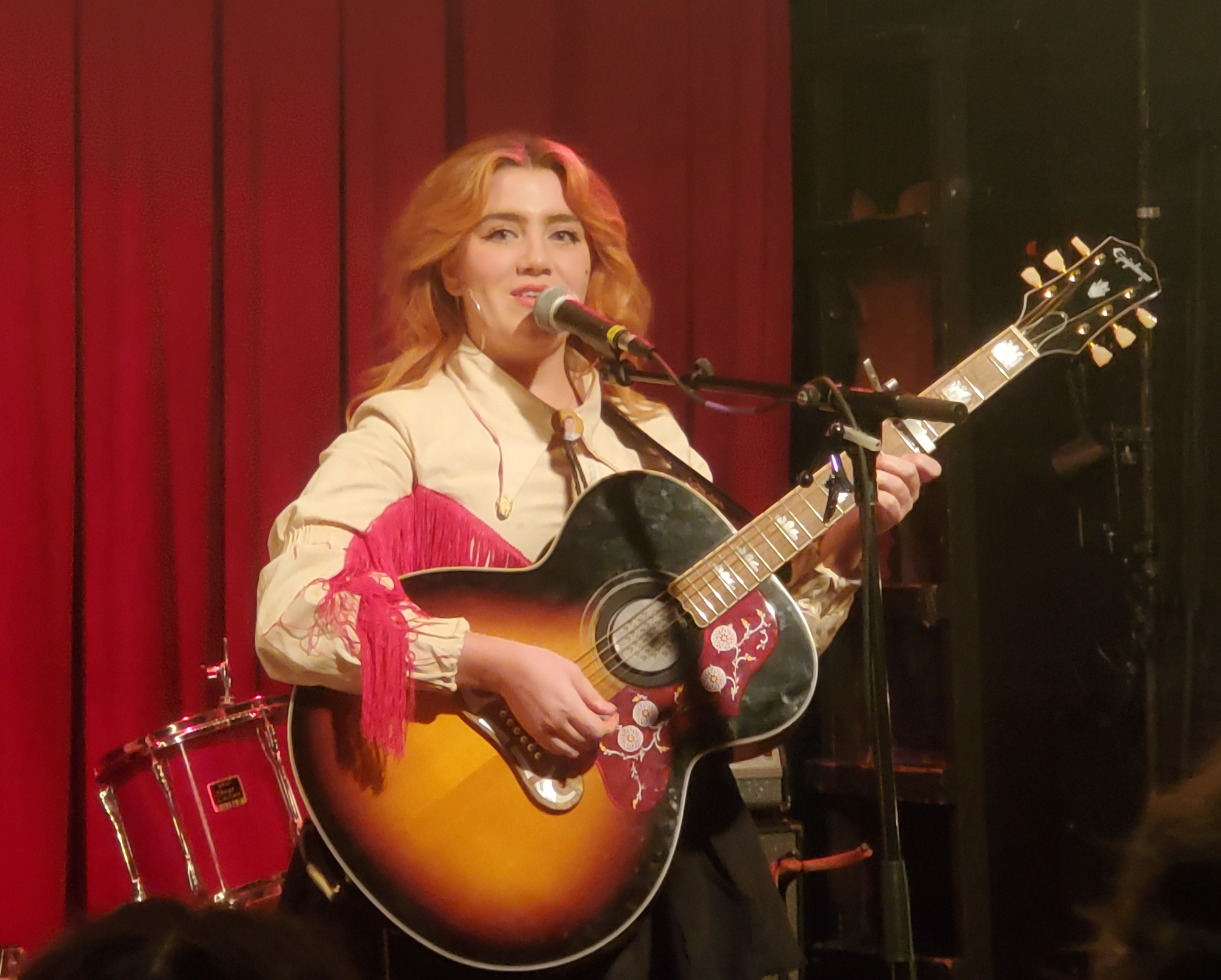
CMAT, 2022 winner

Year	Winner	Album	Shortlisted nominees & albums	Judges
2005	Julie Feeney	13 Songs	Bell X1 – Flock; Cane 141 – Moonpool; The Chalets – Check In; Joe Chester – A Murder of Crows; Duke Special – Adventures in Gramophone; Hal – Hal; Nick Kelly – Running Dog; Emmett Tinley – Attic Faith; Turn – Turn LP	Brian Adams (Today FM); Kernan Andrews (Galway Advertiser); Stuart Bailie (BBC Radio Ulster); Eamonn Carr (Evening Herald); Tony Clayton-Lea (The Irish Times); Mick Heaney (Sunday Times); Jenny Huston (2FM); John Kelly (RTÉ Radio 1); John Meagher (Irish Independent); Colm O'Sullivan (Red FM); Meave Quigley (Sunday Mirror); John Walshe (Hot Press)
2006	The Divine Comedy	Victory for the Comic Muse	Director – We Thrive on Big Cities; Duke Special – Songs from the Deep Forest; The Immediate – In Towers and Clouds; David Kitt – Not Fade Away; Messiah J and the Expert – Now This I Have to Hear; Fionn Regan – The End of History; Republic of Loose – Aaagh!; Si Schroeder – Coping Mechanisms; Snow Patrol – Eyes Open	John Caddell (Phantom FM); Stuart Clark (Hot Press); Alison Curtis (Today FM); Neil Dunphy (Sunday Tribune); Sinéad Gleeson (The Ticket); Rick O'Shea (RTÉ 2fm); Nick Kelly (Irish Independent); Mike Knightson (Limerick's Live 95fm); Padraic Kileen (Irish Examiner); Eamon Sweeney (Foggy Notions); Tanya Sweeney (Irish Daily Star); Jonny Tiernan (Alternative Ulster magazine)
2007	Super Extra Bonus Party	Super Extra Bonus Party	Adrian Crowley – Long Distance Swimmer; Cathy Davey – Tales of Silversleeve; Delorentos – In Love with Detail; Dry County – Unexpected Falls; The Flaws – Achieving Vagueness; David Geraghty – Kill Your Darlings; Kíla – Gamblers' Ballet; Róisín Murphy – Overpowered; Stanley Super 800 – Louder & Clearer	Brian Boyd (The Irish Times); Michael Carr (Cork's 96FM and Cork Independent); Ronan Casey (Westmeath Examiner); Alan Corr (RTÉ Guide); Dan Hegarty (2FM); Anne Marie Kelly (Today FM); Sheena McGinley (entertainment.ie); Una Mullally (Sunday Tribune and the Una Rocks blog); Paul McClean (BBC Northern Ireland); Nadine O'Regan (The Sunday Business Post, Phantom 105.2 and blogger); Leagues O'Toole (Foggy Notions); Jon Richards (Galway Bay FM)
2008	Jape	Ritual	Fight Like Apes – Fight Like Apes and the Mystery of the Golden Medallion; Mick Flannery – White Lies; Halfset – Another Way of Being There; Lisa Hannigan – Sea Sew; David Holmes (musician) – The Holy Pictures; Messiah J and the Expert – From the Word Go; Oppenheimer – Take the Whole Midrange and Boost It; R.S.A.G. – Organic Sampler; The Script – The Script	Niall Byrne (State/Nialler9 blog); Edel Coffey (Irish Independent); Ian Dempsey (Today FM); James Foley (Record of the Day); Andrew Hamilton (Clare People); Kieran Hurley (Cork Campus Radio); Paul Mallon (Irish Daily Star Sunday); Lauren Murphy (entertainment.ie); Sinead Ni Mhorda (Phantom FM); Ed Power (Freelance); Rigsy (BBC Northern Ireland¹s Across The Line/ATL TV); Ian Wilson (RTÉ 2fm)
2009	Adrian Crowley	Season of the Sparks	And So I Watch You from Afar – And So I Watch You From Afar; Bell X1 – Blue Lights on the Runway; Codes – Trees Dream in Algebra; Dark Room Notes – We Love You Dark Matter; The Duckworth Lewis Method – The Duckworth Lewis Method; Julie Feeney – Pages; Valerie Francis – Slow Dynamo; Laura Izibor – Let the Truth Be Told; The Swell Season – Strict Joy	Martin Burns (News of the World); Josh Clarke (I102-104FM, Galway); Roisin Dwyer (Hot Press); Tony Fenton (Today FM); Cathal Funge (Phantom 105.2, Dublin); Padraic Halpin (Ragged Words); Sophie Gorman (Irish Independent); John McMahon (RTÉ 2fm); Rob O'Connor (Beat 102 103, Waterford); Eva Staic (Spin 1038, Dublin); Chris Wasser (Evening Herald); Aoife Woodlock (Other Voices)
2010	Two Door Cinema Club	Tourist History	Adebisi Shank – This Is the Second Album of a Band Called Adebisi Shank; The Cast of Cheers – Chariot; Cathy Davey – The Nameless; Fight Like Apes – The Body of Christ and the Legs of Tina Turner; Halves – It Goes, It Goes (Forever & Ever); Imelda May – Mayhem; James Vincent McMorrow – Early in the Morning; O Emperor – Hither Thither; Villagers – Becoming a Jackal	Aidan Cuffe (GoldenPlec); Ray D'Arcy (Today FM); Michelle Doherty (Phantom 105.2); Dave Fanning (RTÉ 2fm); Shane Hegarty (The Irish Times); Chris Jones (Alternative Ulster); Danny McElhinney (The Irish Mail on Sunday); John Meagher (Irish Independent); Jenny Mulligan (entertainment.ie); Celina Murphy (Hot Press); Phil Udell (State.ie); Tony Clayton-Lea (Chairman of Judging Panel)
2011: Held on Thursday 8 March 2012; Paul McLoone's debut as M.C.; Broadcast live on Today FM	Jape	Ocean of Frequency	And So I Watch You From Afar – Gangs; Bell X1 – Bloodless Coup; Cashier No. 9 – To the Death of Fun; Lisa Hannigan – Passenger; The Japanese Popstars – Controlling Your Allegiance; Patrick Kelleher and His Cold Dead Hands – Golden Syrup; Pugwash – The Olympus Sound; Tieranniesaur – Tieranniesaur!; We Cut Corners – Today I Realised I Could Go Home Backwards	Brian Adams (Today FM); John Barker (98FM); Stuart Clarke (Hot Press); Siobhan Maguire (The Sunday Times); Naomi McCardle (Harmless Noise); Lauren Murphy (The Irish Times); Nadine O'Regan (RTÉ/Phantom/Sunday Business Post); Colm O'Sullivan (Red FM); Ed Power (Irish Independent/Irish Examiner); Rigsy (BBC1 Northern Ireland); Penny Rose-Hart (RTÉ Radio 1)
2012: Held on 7 March 2013; Broadcast live on Today FM	Delorentos	Little Sparks	Wallis Bird – Wallis Bird; The Cast of Cheers – Family; Adrian Crowley – I See Three Birds Flying; Damien Dempsey – Almighty Love; Julie Feeney – Clocks; Heathers – Kingdom; Mumblin' Deaf Ro – Dictionary Crimes; Two Door Cinema Club – Beacon; Windings – I Am Not The Crow	Mark Kavanagh (Irish Daily Star); KC (Today FM); Aoife Barry (The Ticket/Blogger/2XM); Craig Fitzpatrick (Hot Press); Elaine Buckley (RTÉ, State, Entertainment.ie); Sean Rocks (Radio1/Arena); Eamonn Sweeney (Irish Independent); Andy Kavanagh (TG4); Steven McCauley (BBC Radio Foyle); Eoghan O'Sullivan (Irish Examiner / blogger); Claire Beck (Phantom FM & GoldenPlec)
2013: Held on 27 February 2014; Broadcast live on Today FM	Villagers	{Awayland}	And So I Watch You from Afar – All Hail Bright Futures; Bell X1 – Chop Chop; Girls Names – The New Life; Kodaline – In a Perfect World; Little Green Cars – Absolute Zero; Mano Le Tough – Changing Days; My Bloody Valentine – MBV; O Emperor – Vitreous; Lisa O'Neill – Same Cloth or Not	John Balfe (Entertainment.ie); Aidan Butler (RTÉ Radio One); Niall Byrne (Nialler9, Irish Independent); Steve Cummins (The Irish Post); Shilpa Ganatra (Irish Daily Star); Daniel Gray (Totally Dublin); Laurence Mackin (The Irish Times); Una Mullally (The Irish Times and TG4); Fin O'Leary (MCD Concerts); Colm O'Sullivan (Today FM); Niall Stokes (Hot Press); Amy McGarrigle (BBC Northern Ireland); Laura Kirkpatrick (Spotify)
2014: Held on 5 March 2015; Broadcast live on Today FM	The Gloaming	The Gloaming	Aphex Twin – Syro; Delorentos – Night Becomes Light; Hozier – Hozier; James Vincent McMorrow – Post Tropical; Sinéad O'Connor – I'm Not Bossy, I'm the Boss; Damien Rice – My Favourite Faded Fantasy; The Riptide Movement – Getting Through; U2 – Songs of Innocence; We Cut Corners – Think Nothing	
2015: Held Thursday 3 March 2016; Broadcast live on Today FM; Paul McLoone's final appearance as M.C.; Final broadcast on Today FM	SOAK	Before We Forgot How to Dream	Girl Band – Holding Hands with Jamie; Ham Sandwich – Stories from the Surface; Gavin James – "Bitter Pill"; Jape – This Chemical Sea; Le Galaxie – Le Club; Colm Mac Con Iomaire – And Now The Weather; Róisín Murphy – Hairless Toys; Villagers – Darling Arithmetic; Young Wonder – Birth	Emily Brown (Spin Southwest); Roddy Cleere (KCLR); Tom Dunne (Newstalk); Sínead Gleeson (The Irish Times); Joe Harrington (Joe.ie); James Hendicott (GoldenPlec); Edwin McFee (Hot Press); Louise McSharry (2FM); Sinéad Ní Mhórdha (Radio Nova); Ed Smith (Today FM); Phil Taggart (BBC Radio 1); Mike Walsh (Radio X)
2016: Held on Thursday 9 March 2017; Eoghan McDermott's debut as M.C.; Broadcast live for the first time on RTÉ 2FM, with highlights on RTÉ2	Rusangano Family	Let The Dead Bury The Dead	All Tvvins – llVV; Wallis Bird – Home; Bantum – Move; The Divine Comedy – Foreverland; Lisa Hannigan – At Swim; Katie Kim – Salt; James Vincent McMorrow – We Move; Overhead, The Albatross – Learning to Growl; We Cut Corners – The Cadences of Others	Louise Bruton – Freelance & The Irish Times; Brian Coney – Editor, The Thin Air; Maire Dineen – Súgradh Productions (Imeall TG4/Body & Soul); Suzanne Doyle – Music, Film & Television Consultant; Dan Hegarty – RTÉ 2FM; Paddy McKenna – Editor, Joe.ie; Cathal Murray – RTÉ Radio 1; Barbara Nic D – Classic Hits 4FM; Colm O’Regan – Hot Press; Niall Power – Head of Music, Beat FM; Eva Short – GoldenPlec & Deputy Editor, Trinity News
2017: Held in Vicar Street on 8 March 2018; Broadcast live on RTÉ 2FM, with highlights on RTÉ2	Ships	Precession	Come On Live Long – In The Still; Marlene Enright – Placemats and Second Cuts; Fangclub – Fangclub; Lankum – Between The Earth & Sky; James Vincent McMorrow – True Care; New Jackson – From Night to Night; Otherkin – OK; Fionn Regan – The Meetings of the Waters; Talos – Wild Alee	Kate Brennan-Harding – Today FM; Martin Byrne – Music Consultant; Stephen Byrne – GoldenPlec; Tracy Clifford – RTÉ 2FM; Alan Donovan – Cork's RedFM; Dave Hanratty – Freelance journalist & broadcaster with NO ENCORE podcast; Hugh Linehan – The Irish Times Culture/Arts/Ticket Editor; Ann Marie Shields – BIMM; Lilian Smith – RTÉ Radio 1; Danny Wilson – Totally Dublin
2018: Held in Vicar Street on 7 March 2019; Broadcast live on RTÉ 2FM, with highlights on RTÉ2	O Emperor	Jason	The Academic – Tales From The Backseat; Delorentos – True Surrender; Just Mustard – Wednesday; Kojaque – Deli Daydreams; Lisa O'Neill – Heard A Long Gone Song; Saint Sister – Shape of Silence; Rejjie Snow – Dear Annie; Villagers – The Art Of Pretending To Swim; Wyvern Lingo – Wyvern Lingo	Louise Cantillion (Classic Hits); Zara Hedderman (Thin Air / Totally Dublin / freelance); Conor McCaffrey (Irish Daily Star / mookidmusic.com); Mike McGrath-Bryan (freelance / nialler9.com); Danny McElhinney (The Irish Mail on Sunday); Cathy Moorehead (Across The Line); Ed Smith (Today FM); Tara Stewart (RTÉ 2FM); Dean Van Nguyen (freelance / The Irish Times); Stephen White (thelastmixedtape.com)
2019: Held in Vicar Street on 5 March 2020; Broadcast live on RTÉ 2FM, with highlights on RTÉ2	Lankum	The Livelong Day	Daithi – L.O.S.S.; Mick Flannery – Mick Flannery; Fontaines D.C. – Dogrel; Girl Band – The Talkies; Jafaris – Stride; Junior Brother – Pull The Right Rope; SOAK – Grim Town; Maija Sofia – Bath Time; Sorcha Richardson – First Prize Bravery	Claire Beck (Today FM); Sarina Bellissimo (Spin 1038); Andrea Cleary (freelance); Steve Grainger (Cork's RedFM); Jenny Greene (RTÉ 2FM); Molly King (Other Voices); Michael Lanigan (Sunday Business Post); Roisin McNickle (BBC Northern Ireland); Eoin Murray (The Thin Air); Fiachna Ó Braonáin (RTÉ Radio 1); Tadgh Williams (Beat 102 103)
2020: Held on 4 March 2021; Broadcast live on RTÉ 2FM, with highlights on RTÉ2	Denise Chaila	Go Bravely	Bitch Falcon – Staring At Clocks; Fontaines D.C. – A Hero's Death; JyellowL – 2020 D|Vision; Róisín Murphy – Róisín Machine; Nealo – All The Leaves Are Falling; Pillow Queens – In Waiting; Ailbhe Reddy – Personal History; Niamh Regan – Hemet; Silverbacks – Fad	Trishauna Archer (Beat FM); Pamela Blake (Today FM); Pavel Barter (The Sunday Times); Gemma Bradley (BBC Radio One Introducing/BBC Radio Ulster Across the Line); Lisa Connell (GCN); Tracy Clifford (RTÉ 2fm); Lauren Murphy (freelance); Derek O’Connor (RTÉ Culture); Claire Regan (LMFM/Virgin Media); Louise Tighe (FM104); Ray Wingnut (Spin South West)
2021: Held on 3 March 2022	For Those I Love	For Those I Love	Bicep – Isles; Mick Flannery & Susan O'Neill – In The Game; Orla Gartland – Woman On The Internet; HousePlants – Dry Goods; Kojaque – Town's Dead; Elaine Mai – Home; Saint Sister – Where I Should End; Soda Blonde – Small Talk; Villagers – Fever Dreams	Eve Blair (BBC Radio Ulster); Craig Connolly (District Magazine); Conor Halpin (Red FM); Ciara King (2FM); Martina McGlynn (RTÉ Radio 1); Kieran McGuinness (Radio Nova); John Meagher (Irish Independent); Aoife Moriarty (Buzz.ie/Irish Daily Star); Emma Nolan (FM104); Kate O’Dwyer (RTÉ One); Orla Ormond (Today FM)
2022: Held on 9 March 2023	CMAT	If My Wife New I'd Be Dead	Fontaines D.C. – Skinty Fia; Aoife Nessa Frances – Protector; Just Mustard – Heart Under; Dermot Kennedy – Sonder; The Mary Wallopers – The Mary Wallopers; Anna Mieke – Theatre; Pillow Queens – Leave the Light On; Sorcha Richardson – Smiling Like an Idiot; Thumper – Delusions of Grandeur	Mags Blackburn (Cork's Red FM); Christine Costello (The Thin Air); Neil Doherty (RTÉ Radio 1); Adam Hogan (RTÉ 2fm); Eddie Hughes (KCLR); Lauren Johnson (BBC Northern Ireland); Sophia McDonald (Totally Dublin/Dublin Digital Radio); Shannon McNamee (The Journal of Music); Des O’Driscoll (The Irish Examiner); Nadine O'Regan (Business Post); Aoife Woodlock (Other Voices)
2023: Held 7 March 2024	Lankum	False Lankum	Grian Chatten – Chaos for the Fly; CMAT – Crazymad, for Me; John Francis Flynn – Look Over the Wall, See the Sky; Kojaque – Phantom of the Afters; Rachael Lavelle – Big Dreams; The Murder Capital – Gigi's Recovery; The Scratch – Mind Yourself; Soda Blonde – Dream Big; Ezra Williams – Supernumeraries	Robert Brown (Chordblossom); Beta da Silva (RTÉ 2fm); Kate Demolder (freelance); Saibh Downes (RTÉ Entertainment); Louise Duffy (RTÉ Radio 1); John Loftus (8Radio); Siobhan McAndrew (BBC Radio Ulster); Alannah McGhee (Other Voices); Dylan Murphy (District Magazine); Eimear Shannon (Today FM); Ava Somers (Beat 102 103)
2024: Held 6 March 2025	Fontaines D.C.	Romance	A Lazarus Soul – No Flowers Grow in Cement Gardens; Curtisy – What Was the Question?; Orla Gartland – Everybody Needs a Hero; Kneecap – Fine Art; NewDad – Madra; Niamh Regan – Come as You Are; Róis – Mo Léan; Silverbacks – Easy Being a Winner; Sprints – Letter to Self	Kate Brayden (Freelance); Niall Byrne (Nialler9); Pat Carty (freelance); Aaron Cunningham (Chordblossom); Nicole Glennon (Irish Examiner); Laura Lomax (RTÉ TV Entertainment); Jon Jon Mehigan (RTÉ 2fm); Stephen McCauley (BBC Radio Ulster); Dray Morgan (District); Fiona Ní Gháibhín (Radio na Life); Lilian Smit (RTÉ Radio 1); Dee Woods (Radio Nova)
2025: Held 5 March 2026	CMAT	Euro-Country	Amble – Reverie; Bricknasty – Black’s Law; Joshua Burnside – Teeth of Time; Dove Ellis – Blizzard; Junior Brother – The End; Just Mustard – We Were Just Here; pôt-pot – Warsaw 480km; Maria Somerville – Luster; SPRINTS – All That Is Over	John Barker (Dublin City FM/Tilt); Aoife Barry (freelance); Ciara Byrne (freelance); Tara Carroll (Genuine Irish); Peter Curtin (RTÉ Lyric FM); Sarah Gill (Image magazine); Deb Grant (BBC Radio 6); Angela Hughes (Radio na Life/8Radio); Cathal Murray (RTÉ Radio 1); Roz Purcell (RTE 2fm); Jamie Taylor (BBC Radio Ulster/BBC Radio Foyle)

=== Artists with multiple nominations and awards ===
Nominations	Wins	Artist
5	1	Villagers
4	1	Delorentos
4	1	Fontaines D.C.
4	0	Bell X1
4	0	James Vincent McMorrow
3	2	CMAT
3	2	Jape
3	2	Lankum
3	1	Adrian Crowley
3	1	Julie Feeney
3	1	O Emperor
3	0	And So I Watch You from Afar
3	0	Just Mustard
3	0	Kojaque
3	0	Lisa Hannigan
3	0	Mick Flannery
3	0	Róisín Murphy

== Eligibility ==
In order to be considered for the Choice Music Prize a release must meet all of the following conditions:

1. All albums must have been released for the very first time in Ireland in the previous calendar year. This means that the album must have been made available for purchase by the general public (in shops, at gigs or on websites) for the very first time in Ireland (i.e. Republic of Ireland and/or Northern Ireland) between 1 January and 31 December of that year.
2. Re-issues, multi-artist compilations, live albums and Best of collections are not eligible
3. The artist(s) in question must have been born in Ireland (i.e. Republic of Ireland or Northern Ireland) and/or hold an Irish passport. Bands are eligible to be nominated if the majority of the band members were born in Ireland (i.e. Republic of Ireland or Northern Ireland) and/or hold an Irish passport.
4. For the purposes of the Choice Music Prize, an album must contain six or more tracks and/or be over 33 minutes and 20 seconds in length.

There is no formal application process for the Choice Music Prize. Once an album meets the above criteria, it is eligible to be considered by the judges for selection.

It's not about the best debut album or the best out-there album or the best pop album or the best album by an old-timer – it's the album that you, the judges, believe best sums up the previous year in Irish music, made by the act you, the judges, believe best represents Irish music and the Choice Music Prize right now.
— E-mail reminder sent to judges of Irish Album of the Year 2008.

== See also ==
- Mercury Prize (United Kingdom)
- Polaris Music Prize (Canada)
- Australian Music Prize (Australia)
- Prix Constantin (France)
- Shortlist Music Prize (United States)
- Nordic Music Prize (Nordic countries)
