= Nialler9 =

Irish music blog founded in 2005

- Website type: Online magazine, music blog
- Available in: English
- Founded: November 2005; 20 years ago
- Headquarters: Dublin, {{{location_country}}}
- Country of origin: Ireland
- Area served: Worldwide
- Founder: Niall Byrne
- Industry: Music
- Website: nialler9.com
- Current status: Active

Nialler9 is an Irish music site and online music magazine founded in 2005 by DJ and writer Niall Byrne. The site is headquartered in Dublin, Ireland. It has been referred to as "the grandaddy of Irish music blogs" by the Sunday Times.

== History ==
Founder Niall Byrne started the website as a portfolio after finishing a course in multimedia design from the Dún Laoghaire Institute of Art, Design and Technology. The site won five consecutive awards at the Irish Blog Awards in the category of Best Music Blog (2007–2011), and has also won the Irish Web Awards Best Music Site category on three occasions (2009, 2013, and 2014). It was voted the 5th Best Music Blog in the World in a poll of music blogging peers in 2010.

Byrne also hosted a radio show under the Nialler9 name on TXFM before the station's closure in 2016. Byrne has written about music for publications including The Irish Times, the Irish Independent, The Sunday Times, Totally Dublin, Cara Magazine and Red Bull.

Byrne co-hosts the Nialler9 Podcast, covering new music, albums, artist deep dives and interviews. The podcast passed 300 episodes in 2026.

The site has published annual end-of-year best-of lists covering albums and songs from Ireland and internationally since its founding. In 2017, Byrne compiled a playlist of 999 songs drawn from Nialler9's history between 2005 and 2017, amounting to over 74 hours of music. The site's annual lists of best new Irish acts provided early coverage of artists who went on to achieve wider recognition. These include Fontaines D.C., Villagers, Adebisi Shank, Fight Like Apes, Super Extra Bonus Party, Rejjie Snow, Lankum, Kojaque, Denise Chaila, Gilla Band, Saint Sister, For Those I Love, CMAT, The Mary Wallopers, Just Mustard and Rusangano Family, Le Galaxie, Talos, Ships, Curtisy, God Knows, and Niamh Regan, among others.

Byrne is a DJ and co-founder of Lumo Club, a monthly club night in Dublin. He has promoted and produced events under the Nialler9 name including the Indie Sleaze Disco Club night and monthly listening parties, and has curated events at SXSW in Austin, Texas, and Camden Crawl in London, as well as for Musictown, the Dublin Theatre Festival, Cork's Sounds From A Safe Harbour festival, and Culture Night Dublin.

Byrne has also worked as a music supervisor and sync licensing consultant, curating music for digital media, advertising, television, films, and in-flight entertainment with an emphasis on emerging Irish music.

Byrne has served on the judging panel for the Choice Music Prize, the annual Irish album of the year award, on multiple occasions including in 2008, 2014, and 2024.

== Album of the Year ==
Since its founding, Nialler9 has published an annual Album of the Year list.

Year	Artist	Album	Source
2006	The Knife	Silent Shout	
2007	Battles	Mirrored	
2008	Why?	Alopecia	
2009	Animal Collective	Merriweather Post Pavilion	
2010	Gorillaz	Plastic Beach	
2011	SBTRKT	SBTRKT	
2012	Chromatics	Kill for Love	
2013	Mount Kimbie	Cold Spring Fault Less Youth	
2014	Run the Jewels	Run the Jewels 2	
2015	Kendrick Lamar	To Pimp a Butterfly	
2016	Frank Ocean	Blonde	
2017	Kendrick Lamar	Damn	
2018	Rosalía	El Mal Querer	
2019	Lana Del Rey	Norman Fucking Rockwell!	
2020	Dua Lipa	Future Nostalgia	
2021	Floating Points, Pharoah Sanders and The London Symphony Orchestra	Promises	
2022	Rosalía	Motomami	
2023	Lankum	False Lankum	
2024	Cindy Lee	Diamond Jubilee	
2025	Rosalía	Lux	

== Irish Album of the Year ==
Nialler9 has published an annual Best Irish Album of the Year list since 2006. From 2006 to 2015 the winner was determined by a public reader vote; from 2016 onwards the selection has been made by Nialler9.

Year	Artist	Album	Notes	Source
2006	Si Schroeder	Coping Mechanisms	Public vote	
2007	Super Extra Bonus Party	Super Extra Bonus Party LP	Public vote	
2008	Jape	Ritual	Public vote	
2009	Patrick Kelleher	You Look Cold	Public vote	
2010	Villagers	Becoming a Jackal	Public vote	
2011	Jape	Ocean of Frequency	Public vote	
2012	The Cast of Cheers	Family	Public vote	
2013	Villagers	{Awayland}	Public vote	
2014	James Vincent McMorrow	Post Tropical	Public vote	
2015	Gilla Band	Holding Hands with Jamie	Public vote	
2016	Rusangano Family	Let the Dead Bury the Dead		
2017	Ships	Precession		
2018	Kojaque	Deli Daydreams		
2019	Gilla Band	The Talkies		
2020	Pillow Queens	In Waiting		
2021	For Those I Love	For Those I Love		
2022	CMAT	If My Wife New I'd Be Dead		
2023	Lankum	False Lankum		
2024	Curtisy	What Was the Question		
2025	CMAT	Euro-Country		
