= Anna Mieke =

Irish folk singer

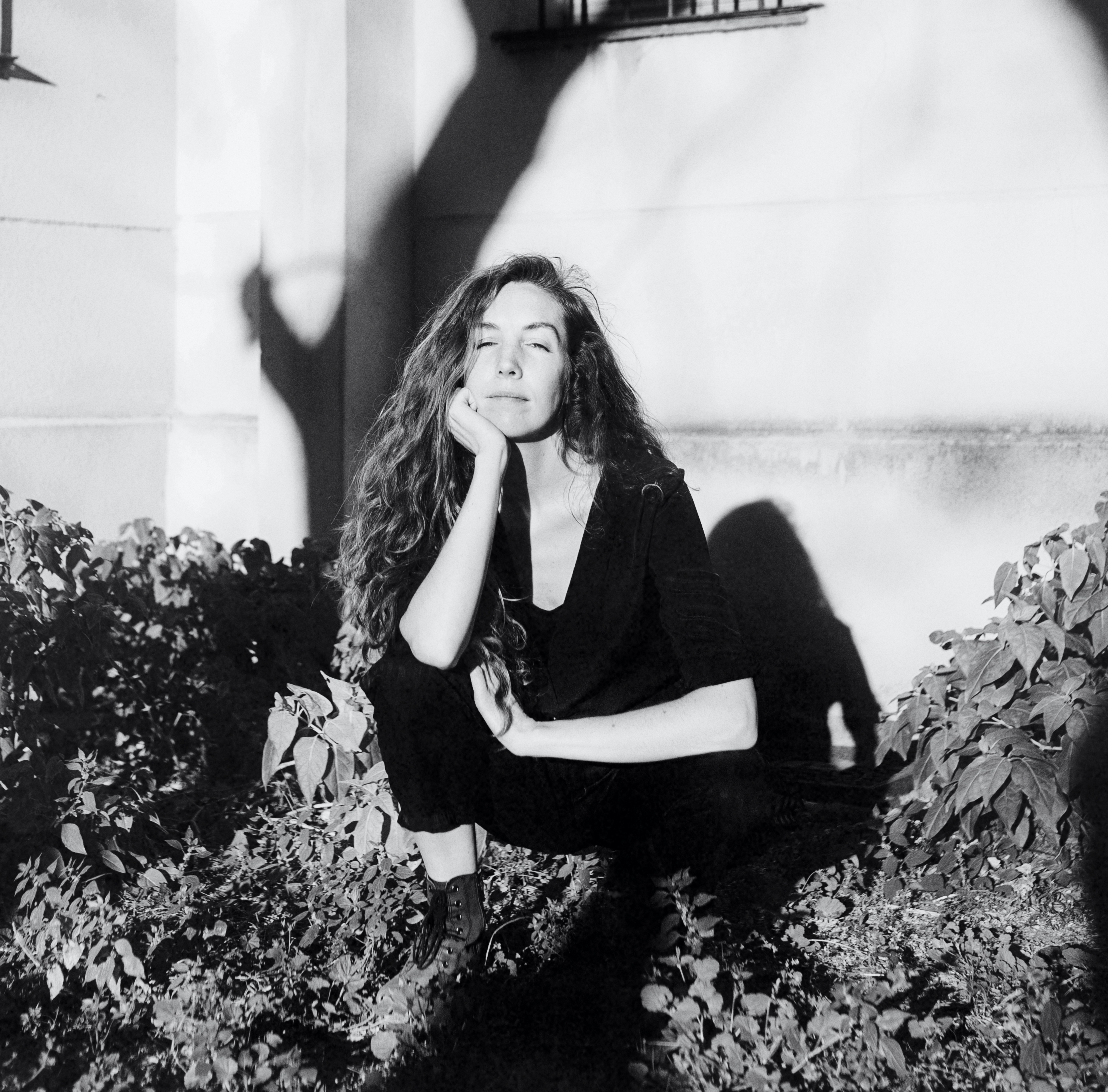
- Credit: Celia Martins

Background information
- Birth name: Anna-Mieke Bishop
- Born: Wicklow, Ireland
- Origin: County Wicklow
- Genres: folk
- Instrument(s): guitar, piano, Greek bouzouki, cello
- Years active: 2019–present
- Website: annamieke.com

Anna-Mieke Bishop, known as Anna Mieke, is a singer, songwriter and musician currently based in County Wicklow, Ireland.

== Early life ==
Anna Mieke was born in Wicklow and has lived in New Zealand and Spain. She studied biochemistry at University College Cork.

== Career ==
Anna Mieke was one of five RTÉ Folk Award Nominees for ‘Best Emerging Act’ 2019, and was a recipient of the Arts Council’s Next Generation Bursary Award 2020. In 2020, her song "Warped Window" appeared on the show Normal People. Her second album Theatre (2022) was nominated for the RTÉ Choice Music Prize.

In 2022, she carried out a week-long residency at the IAC, New York (2022), collaborating with NYC-based musicians and composers, Grey McMurray, Charlotte Greve and Anna Roberts Gevalt. In February 2023 she toured North America for the first time with her band, followed by support tours with Florist and Iron and Wine across Europe and the US. She has also toured throughout Europe and the UK. In recent years, she has also toured with and supported acts including Wilco, Anais Mitchell and Bonny Light Horseman. In 2022 she collaborated with Crash Ensemble as part of their Reactions series, composing a piece, 'Groundwork', for cello, double bass and synths. She has also collaborated with composer Linda Buckley and toured with Adrian Crowley. While living in Cork between 2017-2019, Anna Mieke played cello with HEX, a Cork-based improvisatory group, and, in 2021, toured and recorded an album with singing trio, Rufous Nightjar.

Theatre, Anna Mieke's second album, was recorded + co-produced with Nick Rayner and features long-standing bandmates Ryan Hargadon (Kojaque, Rachael Lavelle) and Matthew Jacobson (UMBRA), as well as contributions from Rozi Leyden (Rozi Plain), Brían Mac Gloinn (Ye Vagabonds), Lina Andonovska, Alannah Thornburgh and Cora Venus Lunny. It was released in November 2022. The Guardian awarded it 4 stars, saying Anna Mieke "mines a rich seam of nostalgia and loss – and her extensive travels – on a dreamlike second album"., and featured in Brooklyn Vegan and MOJO magazine among others. Uncut praised the album as “beguiling and really rather wonderful” while the Revue described the songs as having “a combination of Agnes Obel’s symphonic experimentation and Aldous Harding’s lyrical creativity…an artist who brilliantly incorporates fantasy, and mysticism into music”.

== Discography ==
Studio albums

- Idle Mind (2019)
- Theatre (2022)
