= Murli =

Murli may refer to:

- Murli, Bihar
- Murli (instrument)
- MuRli, Togolese-Irish rapper
