= WNO =

WNO may refer to the:

- Web News Observer, a news organization, Mysore, Karnataka, India.
- Washington National Opera, an opera company, Washington, D.C., U.S.A
- Welsh National Opera, a touring opera company, Cardiff, Wales
- Who's Number One, a grappling event organised by FloSports.
- Woodend railway station, Victoria
