= Curtisy =

Irish rapper

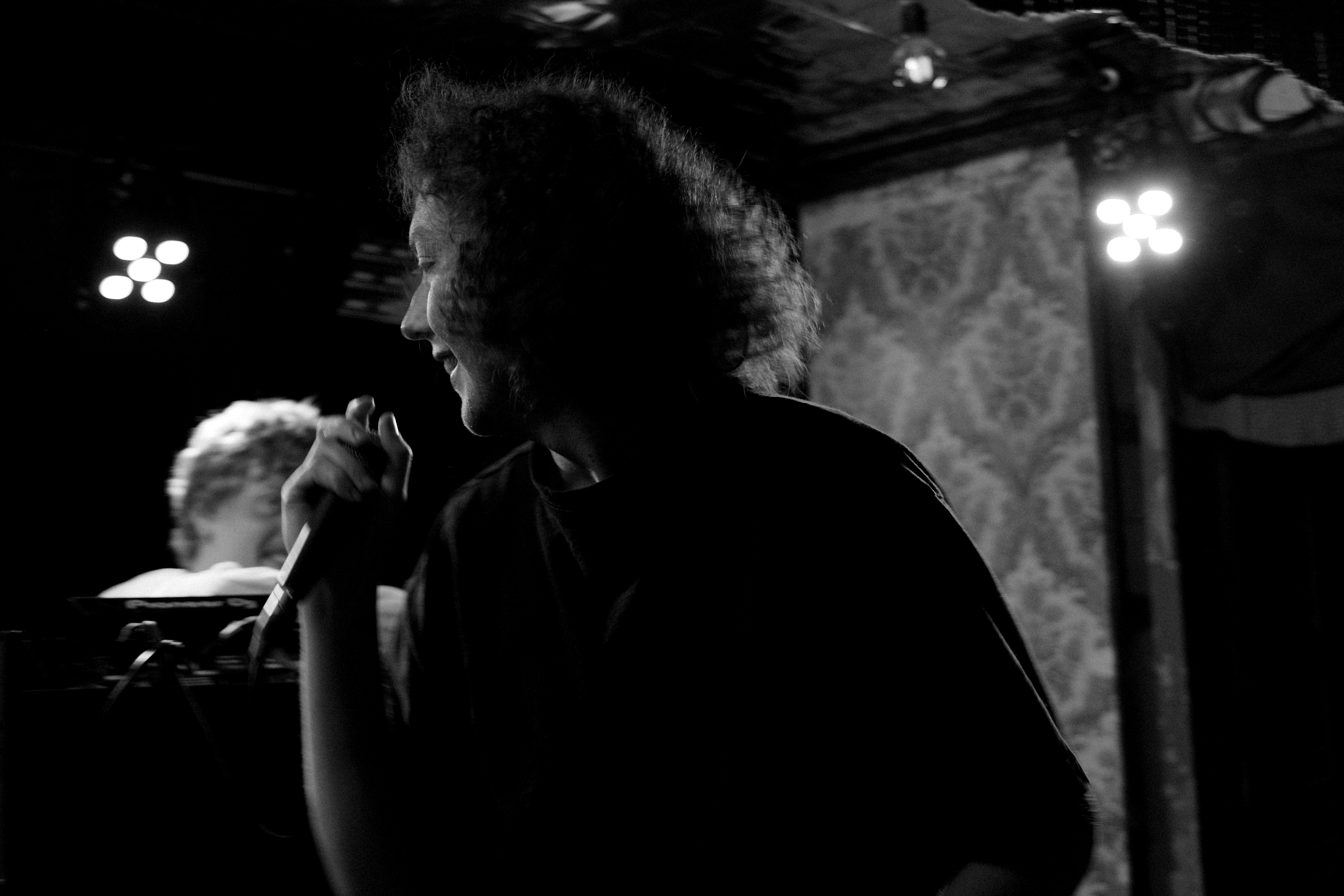
- Curtisy performs at the What Was The Question? launch party in The Workmans' Cellar

Background information
- Born: Gavin Curtis; 1999/2000; Dublin, Ireland
- Origin: Tallaght
- Genres: Hip hop; rap
- Occupation: Rapper
- Years active: 2020–present
- Label: Brook Records

Gavin Curtis (born 1999/2000), known professionally as Curtisy, is an Irish rapper from Tallaght.

== Early life ==
Curtisy grew up in Jobstown, Tallaght.

== Career ==
Curtisy became popular on SoundCloud during the COVID-19 lockdowns. In January 2022 he released "Men on a Mission," a collaboration with Ahmed, With Love.

He cites Earl Sweatshirt, Kojaque and Wiki as influences.

Curtisy released What Was The Question, his first album, in 2024, which reached #3 on the Irish Independent Albums Chart and was nominated for the Choice Music Prize. The Irish Times praised it, saying "For someone at the start of a creative career, it’s a brilliantly accomplished album. The sound and feel, if not coming wholly from the depths of the wooziness of pandemic-era lockdowns, is certainly informed by a sort of existentialism or purgatorial state. And yet it’s neither wallowing nor a drag." His mixtape Beauty In The Beast followed in 2025.

== Discography ==
Albums

- What Was The Question (2024)
- Get a Life! (with owin) (2026)

Mixtapes

- Beauty In The Beast (with Hikii) (2025)

EPs

- EP OF SORTS (with D*mp) (2022)
- BLACKMGC* (with Tape Eater) (2023)
- Ahmed, With FRIENDS! Vol.1: Friday at Kylté's (with Ahmed, With Love and Kylté) (2025)

== Awards ==
=== RTÉ Choice Music Prize ===
- 2024 Irish Album of the Year - What Was The Question (Nominated)

== Personal life ==
Curtisy still lives in his family home, in a garden shed, due to the high price of housing in Ireland.
