= Stars Come Out =

Stars Come Out may refer to:

- "Stars Come Out", song by Stanley Super 800 from Louder & Clearer 2007
- "Stars Come Out", song by ATB from Trilogy (ATB album)
- "Stars Come Out", song by Calvin Harris from Ready for the Weekend (album)
