= We Cut Corners =

Irish indie rock duo

- Origin: Dublin
- Genres: indie rock; indie; Pop rock; Indie folk; Garage rock
- Years active: 2011–present
- Labels: Delphi
- Members: John Duignan; Conall Ó Breacháin
- Website: wecutcorners.net

We Cut Corners are an Irish indie rock duo from Dublin.

== Career ==
John Duignan and Conall Ó Breacháin met in college. They founded We Cut Corners in 2011. Their influences include Ryan Adams, Vampire Weekend and Leonard Cohen. Their first three studio albums were all nominated for the Choice Music Prize.

== Personnel ==
- John Duignan (guitar, vocals)
- Conall Ó Breacháin (drums, vocals)

== Discography ==
Albums

- Today I Realised I Could Go Home Backwards (2011)
- Think Nothing (2014)
- The Cadences of Others (2016)
- Impostors (2018)
