= Come On Live Long =

Irish folk-electronica band

- Origin: Dublin
- Genres: indie; folk; electronica; alternative; folktronica; R&B
- Years active: 2010–present
- Members: Robert Ardiff; Louise Gaffney; Steve Battle; David O’Connor; Ken McCabe
- Website: www.facebook.com/comeonlivelongband

Come On Live Long is an Irish folk-electronica band based in Dublin.

== Career ==
Come On Live Long were founded in 2010. Vocalist Louise Gaffney named Kanye West, Stars of the Lid and Max Richter as inspirations.

Their second album, In The Still, was nominated for the Choice Music Prize in 2017.

== Personnel ==
- Robert Ardiff (vocals, ukulele, guitar)
- Louise Gaffney (vocals, keyboard)
- Steve Battle (drums, percussion)
- David O’Connor (guitar, synth, samples)
- Ken McCabe (bass)

== Discography ==
Albums

- Everything Fall (2013)
- In The Still (2017)

EPs

- Mender (2011)
- Come On Live Long EP (2012)
