= Web News Observer =

American online news publication

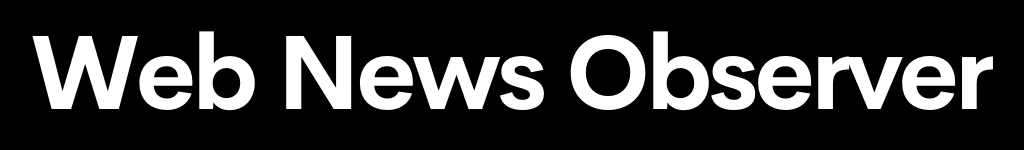
- Website type: News website
- Available in: English
- Founded: 12 January 2019; 7 years ago
- Headquarters: Austin, Texas, United States
- Owner: Entrilex News Network LLC
- Editor: Musba Hashmi
- Website: webnewsobserver.com
- Commercial: Yes
- Launched: 12 January 2019; 7 years ago
- Current status: Online

Web News Observer is an American online news publication headquartered in Austin, Texas, United States, and owned by Entrilex News Network LLC. The website publishes news and features covering entertainment, lifestyle, Korean popular culture, technology, sports and business.

== History ==
Web News Observer initially focused on cybersecurity and technology news. During the COVID-19 pandemic, it expanded its coverage to include entertainment and lifestyle.

The publication reached one million monthly unique users on 20 April 2022. On 29 April 2022, it partnered with Dailyhunt for news syndication.

Web News Observer acquired the website of The Clare People, a defunct Irish weekly newspaper, on 9 May 2022. By 8 June 2022, the publication had reached three million monthly unique users.

Entrilex News Network LLC acquired Web News Observer on 27 June 2026. Following the acquisition, the publication moved its headquarters from Mysore, India, to Austin, Texas, United States. Stacknexo LLP continued to manage the publication's editorial operations and its Indian edition from Mysore.

== Notable work ==
In November 2021, the news website did exclusive news stories exposing two cybersecurity scams where the scammers were impersonating Elon Musk through a verified Facebook page and were running a cryptocurrency giveaway scam. The page was then taken down soon after when the story was covered by other media outlets.

The media outlet is building India's first e-learning platform for data journalism. The platform will help train journalists and students to study and get trained in data journalism free of cost. The news organization is also known for its active engagement in social work. On 18 April 2022, it distributed books and stationery among the underprivileged children of Mysore. They also conducted an online journalism training workshop for aspiring students.

On 23 May 2022, the media outlet introduced its website on Web 3.0, becoming the first news website in India to have a version of its website on Web 3.0.

== See also ==
- Star of Mysore
- Mysooru Mithra
