= Supernumeraries =

Studio album by Ezra Williams
- Released: 16 June 2023
- Genre: Indie pop
- Length: 44:55
- Language: English
- Label: AWAL
- Producer: Ezra Williams

Singles from Supernumeraries
- 1. "Skin" Released: 7 June 2023

“This song is about trying to start dating again after heartbreak, the comparing of new people to past and accidentally falling back into bad habits from previous relationships. Knowing you’re not being treated properly but not caring because you can’t handle being alone.”

— Williams on single "Skin"

Supernumeraries is the debut full-length studio album by Irish musician Ezra Williams (formerly known as Smoothboi Ezra). It has received positive reviews from critics.

== Reception ==
In The Irish Times, Tony Clayton-Lea rates this release 3.5 out of 5 stars, writing that it "weaves a deliciously measured path between perceived shortcomings, vulnerability and gradual acceptance". Writing for The Line of Best Fit, Bethan Eyre gave this album an 8 out of 10, for uniquely exploring love as a topic and making "a record of vulnerability and introspection". NME's Sophie Williams rated this album 4 out of 5 stars, calling the music "intimate and diaristic". The editors at Paste picked this for one of the 10 best albums of June 2023, with critic Matt Mitchell calling it "a collage of different genres and experiments, ranging from delicate synth-pop to singer/songwriter alt-rock" and in a profile of the musician for the magazine, Mitchell elaborated that the release "is, at its core, an album that dares to make sense of growing pains without coming to some grand solution for how they got there or how long they will endure".

== Track listing ==
All songs written by Ezra Williams.

1. "Skin" – 3:01
2. "Bleed" – 2:57
3. "Deep Routed" – 3:47
4. "Don’t Wake Me Up" – 2:31
5. "My Nose" – 4:13
6. "Beside Me" – 3:50
7. "I Miss You(r) Face" – 3:08
8. "My Friend" – 2:21
9. "Until I’m Home" – 4:05
10. "Babyteeth" – 4:13
11. "Just Not" – 4:27
12. "Seventeen" – 6:20

== Personnel ==
- Ezra Williams – bass guitar, piano, synthesizer, electronic percussion, vocals, production
- Matt Colton – mastering
- Sammy Copley – performance on "Until I'm Home"
- Ghrian – vocals on "Deep Routed"
- Monday Hates You – vocals on "Miss You(r Face)"
- Jacky O'Halloran – Music Production on "Just Not" and "Seventeen"

== See also ==
- List of 2023 albums
