= Super Extra Bonus Party LP =

Studio album by Super Extra Bonus Party
- Released: April 13, 2007
- Recorded: 2006–2007
- Genre: Indie electronic
- Length: 61:40
- Label: Alphabet Set

Professional ratings
Review scores
Source	Rating
Foggy Notions	4/5
The Star	5/5
The Irish Times	4/5
Metro	4/5
Mongrel	4/5
Sunday Tribune	3/5

Super Extra Bonus Party LP is Super Extra Bonus Party's debut Choice Music Prize winning album. It was released on April 13, 2007. It has received much critical acclaim in Ireland and has been called "the most inventive Irish album this decade" and "contender for Irish album of the year". It was nominated for the Choice Music Prize in January 2007, subsequently winning on February 27.

== Track listing ==
1. "Adventures" – 4:52
2. "On the Skyline" – 3:52
  - Featuring Nina Hynes
3. "Everything Flows" – 3:26
  - Featuring Paul O'Reilly
4. "Softly" – 6:18
5. "Mushie Shake" – 4:17
6. "Spanik Sabotage" – 6:30
7. "Super Noise" – 2:38
  - Featuring White Noise
8. "Son Varios" – 4:04
9. "Dorothy Goes Home" – 5:19
  - Featuring Nina Hynes
10. "Favourite Things" – 4:42
11. "Erosion" – 4:23
  - Featuring Iain of Kill City Defectors
12. "Drone Rock" – 5:09
13. "Propeller" – 6:09
