= Sammy Copley =

Irish singer-songwriter (born 2001)

- Born: March 16, 2001 (age 25); Dublin, Ireland
- Genres: Singer-songwriter; Bedroom pop; indie pop
- Occupations: Singer-songwriter, YouTuber
- Label: Tinpot Records
- Website: sammycopley.com

Sammy Copley (born 16 March 2001) is an Irish singer, songwriter, and YouTuber. Copley began his career on YouTube in 2015, uploading covers of popular songs. Since than he has uploaded more than 230 videos and, as of November 2026, has amassed over 252 thousand subscribers and more than 28 million views on his YouTube channel. He is also active on TikTok. Copley has released two EPs; The City (2020) and Little Box (2022), and one album; Growing Pains (2021).

== Career ==
Copley started uploading covers and self-written songs to his YouTube Channel in 2015 at the age of 14. He has cited Paul Simon, Carole King and Joni Mitchell as being heavy inspirations to him.

From 2021 to 2024 Copley was signed with Tom Rosenthal's indie label Tinpot Records. Since 2024 he is an independent musician. He has collaborated with producer Nathan Cox.

Copley has performed in Dublin, London and multiple other European cities. In October 2026 he went on a tour spanning three concerts across Germany.

== Personal life ==
Copley is based in Dublin, Ireland. He is transgender and identifies as queer. Copley uses he/him pronouns. He has stated that his queer identity has a significant impact on his music, saying that "all of [his] music is inherently queer".

Copley studied under the Department of Drama and Theatre Studies at Trinity College Dublin.

== Discography ==
=== Albums ===
- Growing Pains (2021)

=== Extended plays ===
- The City (2020)
- Little Box (2022)

=== Singles ===
- Good Lie (2019)
- Moving Day (2020)
- Marsha (2021)
- To the Bone (2022)
- Little Box (2022)
- You (2022)
- Terms of Endearment (Demo) (2023)
- You (feat. Dan Mangan) (2024)
- Michael's Tree (2024)

=== Guest appearances ===
- nobody but me (postcards version) [feat. Sammy Copley], Maria Kelly (2022)
- Dust (feat. Sammy Copley), Ezra Glatt (2022)
- Until I'm Home, Ezra Williams (2023)
- HEAVEN SHOULDN'T HAVE YOU, Kojaque & Sammy Copley (2023)
