= Ships (Irish band) =

Irish synth-pop-disco duo

- Origin: Dublin
- Genres: synth-pop; disco; electropop
- Years active: 2011–present
- Members: Simon Cullen; Sorca McGrath
- Website: Facebook page

Ships are an Irish synth-pop-disco duo based in Dublin. They won the Choice Music Prize in 2017.

== Career ==
Ships are composed of real-life couple Simon Cullen and Sorca McGrath. Cullen graduated from Trinity College, Dublin in 2004 with an M.Phil. in Music and Media Technology. McGrath has been making music since her early teens, citing Kim Deal and Prince as inspirations, and was in the band Wounded Healer. They formed Ships in 2011, the name being a reference to relationships, friendships, scholarships etc.

Their debut album Precession, self-released via Irish crowdsourcing site Fundit, won the Choice Music Prize in 2017.

== Discography ==
Albums

- Precession (2017)

Singles

- "You're Gonna Feel It" (2012)
- "Space Inside"
