= Class Act (Irish TV series) =

Irish TV talent show

- Genre: Talent show
- Starring: Aidan Power (2007), Síle Seoige (2007), Derek Mooney (2008)
- Country of origin: Ireland
- Original language: English
- No. of series: 2
- No. of episodes: 12

Production
- Executive producer: Billy McGrath
- Producer: Sideline Productions

Original release
- Network: RTÉ One
- Release: 12 October 2008

Class Act is an Irish talent show which last aired on RTÉ One on Sundays at 18:30 throughout September and October 2008. It was presented by Derek Mooney. The show involved a search for young people with special talents whose efforts are then judged on television.

In 2009, due to RTÉ cutbacks, the programme was axed.

== 2007 series ==
The 2007 series was presented by Aidan Power and Síle Seoige. It was broadcast on Sundays at 18:30, beginning on 16 September. The three judges of in this series were Cora Venus Lunny, Tony Lundon and Adele King (Twink). The winners of this series were Cathal and Fergal Keaney, from Galway.

== 2008 series ==
Out of 10,000 entries, the winner was singer and guitarist, Hugh O'Neill from County Sligo, who won €10,000 after playing a self-composed ditty. He beat Joe Dolan impersonator John Fagan from County Dublin into second place. The six finalists performed live on television from Dublin's Tivoli Theatre on 12 October 2008. They faced a public vote for the first time, having previously been picked on by three judges including Caroline Morahan. The three judges were Caroline Morahan, Doctor Veronica Dunne and Julian Benson.

=== Broadcasting schedule ===
There were a total of six episodes, broadcast over a six-week period in September and October 2008.

- Programme 1 - Sunday 7 September, 18.30pm RTÉ One
- Programme 2 - Sunday 14 September, 18.30pm RTÉ One
- Programme 3 - Sunday 21 September, 18.30pm RTÉ One
- Programme 4 - Sunday 28 September, 18.30pm RTÉ One
- Programme 5 - Sunday 5 October, 18.30pm RTÉ One
- Programme 6 - Sunday 12 October, 18.30pm RTÉ One (Live Final)

=== Contestants ===
Six contestants competed for two places in the live final in each of episodes three, four and five. The Randomers, Megan Burke, Showgirls and Franz Lawlor exited in episode three. Hugh O'Neill and John Fagan progressed to the live final. Gary Sheridan, Adam Bouktila, Niamh Regan and Moneeka Mukerjee exited in episode four. L'Agnello and Elementz progressed to the live final. Ciara Lyons, Michael Costello, Damien McCarthy and Celtic Roses exited in episode five. Sarah Gannon and Double Trouble progressed to the live final.

Episode six was the live final. The six finalists competed for €10,000. Double Trouble, L'Agnello, Sarah Gannon, John Fagan and Elementz failed. Hugh O'Neill won.
