= Denise Chaila =

Irish-Zambian hip-hop singer

- Origin: Zambia/Limerick
- Genres: Hip hop; R&B; grime
- Years active: 2012–present
- Label: Narolane Records
- Website: Denise Chaila on Facebook

Denise Mwaka Chaila is an Irish-Zambian rapper, singer, poet, grime and hip hop artist based in Limerick.

== Career ==
Chaila began performing on the Limerick music scene in 2012. Chaila released her debut EP, Duel Citizenship, in 2019. She had already featured on the 2016 Rusangano Family album, Let the Dead Bury the Dead and performs with them regularly. Cillian Murphy featured Chaila's music on his BBC Radio 6 show and interviewed her for Port magazine. She was one of the performers at the Perspectives: Imagining Ireland. Speaking Up, Singing Louder in National Concert Hall, Dublin on 9 February 2020. Her first album, Go Bravely, was released on 2 October 2020. Chaila was one of the musical acts featured in the series of remote performances during the COVID-19 pandemic, Other Voices: Courage, in May 2020. The one-hour performance was recorded in the National Gallery of Ireland. On 3 July 2021, Chaila was one of the headline acts to appear at a pilot music festival held in the grounds of the Royal Hospital, Kilmainham, held to test how festivals might be run in the wake of the COVID-19 pandemic. In April / May 2022, she opened for Ed Sheeran on his Irish dates of the Mathematics tour.

== Personal life ==
Chaila was born at Chikankata-Mazabuka District, Zambia, daughter of Elijah and Lydia Chaila. Her family moved to Ireland when she was aged three, when her father, a neurological consultant, was offered a position at a hospital in Dublin. Her mother is a hospital radiographer. The family later moved to Limerick. She attended the Kings Hospital Secondary School in Palmerstown and went on to study English literature and sociology at the University of Limerick.

== Discography ==
- Duel Citizenship EP (2019)
- Go Bravely LP (2020)

== Awards and nominations ==
=== Choice Music Prize ===
Year	Nominated work	Award	Result
2020	Go Bravely	Album of the Year	Won
