= Wyvern Lingo =

Irish band

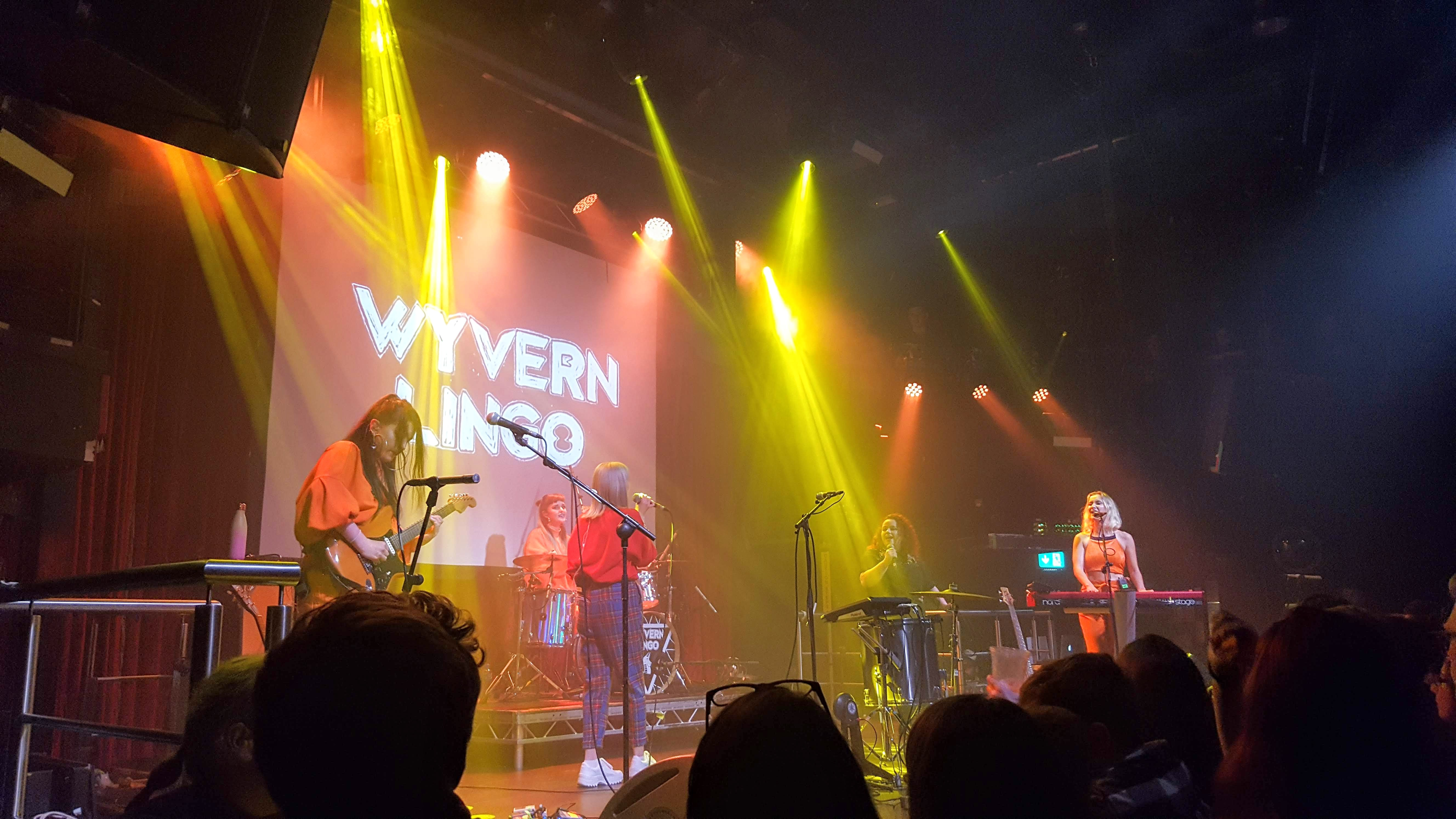
- Wyvern Lingo performing in 2018 at The Academy, Dublin

Background information
- Origin: Bray, County Wicklow, Ireland
- Genres: R&B; pop; a cappella
- Years active: 2014–present
- Label: Rubyworks Records
- Members: Caoimhe Barry; Karen Cowley; Saoirse Duane
- Website: www.wyvernlingo.com

Wyvern Lingo are an Irish band from Bray in County Wicklow. It consists of Caoimhe Barry (vocals, drums, guitar), Karen Cowley (vocals, synth, bass) and Saoirse Duane (vocals, guitar).

== Musicianship ==
Wyvern Lingo often incorporate elements of R&B in their music. According to The Irish Times their "eponymous debut album goes even further down that experimental rabbit hole".

== Career ==
Barry, Cowley and Duane were childhood friends who forged lasting musical bonds as they grew older. Before the release of their debut record, the band collaborated with the artist Hozier singing backing vocals in his live band and toured as his opening act. Along with their first Headline Tour, the band has received significant radio play in Ireland.

In support of their debut album, Wyvern Lingo made their first TV appearance in 2016 on The Late Late Show, broadcast on RTÉ. In a 2018 interview with Totally Dublin, Duane said of the band's sound and growth over the years from childhood to the present: "I wouldn’t call it a shift. As a band — our sound has matured. We’ve put a lot of work in and it’s kind of just naturally gone there. It felt like a very organic progression." The band made their first appearance on the songwriter television series Other Voices, based in County Kerry, Ireland.

Wyvern Lingo became a featured band with MCD Productions, an Irish concert promotion company.

Wyvern Lingo were a featured act for the Windmill Lane sessions.

In July 2018, the band was listed as the support act for the band Walking on Cars for the Galway International Arts Festival 2018. In August it performed at the Electric Picnic festival.

In 2020, the band were part of an Irish collective of female singers and musicians called "Irish Women in Harmony", that recorded a version of the song "Dreams" in aid of the charity Safe Ireland, which deals with domestic abuse which had reportedly risen significantly during the COVID-19 lockdown.

In 2022, the band announced plans to take a break from performing as a group.

== Reviews ==
According to GoldenPlec, Wyvern Lingo's self-titled debut was one of the most anticipated Irish releases of 2018.

The band generated excitement about the album with the release of "Subside" and "I Love You Sadie", the latter nominated for the RTÉ Choice Music Prize "Song of the Year 2017". The GoldenPlec review stated that the album combined some of the finest elements of neo R&B, soul and indie, mentioning the group's ability to write memorable hooks and haunting vocal melodies. The Irish music review outlet Hotpress called their 2018 album an "easy to love debut album" and gave it a score of 8 out of 10.

== Discography ==
- The Widow Knows (EP, 2014)
- Wyvern Lingo (2018)
- Awake You Lie (2021)

== Tours ==
In 2018, Wyvern Lingo played their first headline tour of Ireland and the United Kingdom.
