= Julie Feeney =

- Genres: Indie pop; art pop; baroque pop
- Occupations: Singer; composer; record producer; songwriter; conductor
- Years active: 2005–present
- Labels: mittens; Sony BMG
- Website: www.juliefeeney.com

Julie Feeney is a singer-songwriter, composer, actress, and record producer from Galway, Ireland. She produces and orchestrates her own work, composing both instrumental and electronic music, with full orchestrations. A three-time nominee for the Meteor Choice Music Prize for Irish Album of the Year. She won the award in 2006 for debut album 13 songs. She has released three studio albums on her own label 'Mittens': 13 songs (2005), pages (2009), and Clocks (2012). Clocks entered at No.1 on the Irish Independent Albums Chart and No. 7 on the Main Irish albums charts making it her highest-charting album to date. Earlier in her career, she worked as a professional choral singer and educator.

== Live shows ==
Feeney has performed her own show in Ireland, England, Scotland, France, Germany, Italy, Holland, America, Brazil, Mexico, Canada and China including performing to a capacity audience of 1200 at Ireland's National Concert Hall in Dublin to a 10-minute standing ovation in 2010 and in 2013. In The New York Times in 2012 during her 10-night run at the Irish Arts Center in New York, Jon Pareles said, "A brainy, adventurous Irish songwriter lives within the flamboyant theatricality of Julie Feeney ... intricate, articulate ... Ms. Feeney's songs don't shout. They tease, ponder, reminisce, philosophize and invent parables, and she sings them in a plush, changeable mezzo-soprano that usually holds a kindly twinkle". Jon Pareles also described her songs as "songs that set character studies and philosophical musings in elaborate musical confections, often with long, internally rhymed lines." He continued, "Ms. Feeney's music draws on sources across centuries. Her ensemble, including strings, trumpet and sometimes a recorder, often sounds like a Baroque consort, spinning contrapuntal arpeggios; it also hints at folk-pop, Minimalism and the metrical gamesmanship of progressive rock. 'One More Tune' used syncopated handclaps reminiscent of Steve Reich and a trumpet line hinting at a village brass band, while a new song, 'If I Lose You Tonight,' which she sang accompanied only by a few notes from a mandolin, had the melodic purity of a traditional Irish ballad. Her best-known song, 'Impossibly Beautiful' could almost be a pop motet, with vocal harmonies from her band members". About her theatricality he commented "transforming her face from otherworldly composure to private mourning to nutty intensity, song by song. But the showmanship was a bonus; her songs easily stood on their own ... Theatrical on the Shell, Intricate at the Core". One of Feeney's performances in London in 2007 received a five-star London Evening Standard review and stated that she "captivated the crowd from the moment she stepped on stage".

Hot Press stated that she had "mesmerising stage presence and eccentric pop genius". The Huffington Post in a live review in 2012 described Feeney as, "a Weird and Wonderful Irish Import". The Huffington Post commented, "Feeney presents an entrancing and startling evening of poetic imagery, well crafted stories, delicate emotions, unexpected cadences, sudden silences, coy humor and tightly-wound tunes with hit-caliber hooks, sometimes delivered with cool detachment, at other times with a riveting directness ... It's high-wire performance art in a well-crafted show–blocked, lighted and rehearsed like a theater piece–that flows and eddies on shifts in tempo, mood, dynamics and instrumentation". In relation to other performers it continued, "Vocally, she's been compared to Sinéad O'Connor and Björk (a fellow traveler in extreme fashion) and to musicians ranging from Laurie Anderson to Elvis Costello, from David Bowie to Tori Amos. Other iconic musical performers came to mind–Leonard Cohen, Paolo Conte, Tom Waits—singers and songwriters with their own original hard-to-categorize, highly original styles. I also heard echoes of French film soundtracks, Pachelbel's Canon, Nino Rota (known for his Fellini and The Godfather scores) Philip Glass and a long forgotten carousel ride." It further commented, "And her technique in using the microphone almost as a musical instrument reminded me of jazz legend Betty Carter".

== 13 songs (2005) ==
The self-produced debut album won the Choice Music Prize for Irish Album of the Year in 2006 and garnered glowing four and five stars in all major UK and Irish press.

A multi-instrumentalist, Feeney plays eleven instruments on 13 songs, including keyboards, alto recorder, treble recorder, harmonium, accordion, violin, harmonica, melodica, xylophone and a clock. However, according to The Irish Times of 16 September 2005, "the most impressive sound is Julie's sustained vocal note on Aching, which clocks in at a lung-bursting 28 seconds" and also declared, "Julie Feeney represents a new eclecticism ... Lyrically sage, musically taut, 13 songs is a wonderful, wistful collection". The Irish Independent called it "a rare gem".

The New York Times called it "a charming, urbane and dreamy record" while The Observer said "this album marks the blossoming of a major talent". The Evening Standard said it was "2007's first delight ... a beguiling mix of the baroque ... and the hypnotic avant-garde" and The Guardian said "the world will listen".

The RTÉ Guide stated that 13 songs is "surely one of the greatest debut records ever made in this country ... sophisticated stuff" and The Tuam Herald described it as "adult contemporary ... highly sophisticated, European music ... Julie's clear, high vocals paint abstract pictures of love, life and friendship from a twenty-something perspective". The Dubliner said "this album is startling ... a fascinating record", and Q said "she certainly won't be confused for anyone else".

Hot Press stated, "With this debut album Julie Feeney announces herself as the most intriguing female voice ... to come out of Ireland since Sinead O'Connor ... for sheer originality, courage and raw talent, Feeney deserves to soar above and beyond even the merely excellent". The Sligo Weekender said, "the most impressive aspect of Feeney's musical spectrum is her voice. With little rivalry for purity, it ranges from infant-like wonder ("Judas") to quite sexy and sultry (Under My Skin) ... Julie sings 'I'm aching for you', just three times on the single, but each one weighs in at 20 to 28 seconds long, a phenomenal achievement for any voice". The Sunday Times called '13 songs' "a refreshingly original distillation".

13 songs was self-funded through a series of bank loans and was self-released. She also funded and produced her first music video before being signed for two years (2006–2008) to Sony BMG (U.K.) (which shut in 2008) for the song 'Fictitious Richard' from 13 songs and it was directed by young Irish director Vittoria Colonna. It featured Feeney's favourite car, the Volkswagen Beetle. Her second music video was directed by Maria Mozchnacz for the song 'Aching'. and it was the only music video funded by Sony BMG.

The artwork for 13 songs was all done by Feeney and characterised by her own distinctive hand-writing and hand-drawn patterns. The same artwork is used on her official website. The self-styled album-cover photo was taken by Eoin Wright. They did five shoots before Feeney settled the right photo.

== Pages (2009) ==
Feeney's second self-produced album, pages was released in Ireland through Mittens in June 2009, and was widely highly critically acclaimed. It entered at number 26 in the Irish charts. In December 2009 it featured in the "Hot Press Top 250 Irish Albums of All Time" poll only 6 months after its Irish release at number 55, making it the highest placed 2009 release on the poll. The album also featured highly on numerous other end of year polls and has been nominated for the Choice Music Prize Irish Album of the Year 2009. It was also listed in "101 Irish Records (You Must Hear Before You Die) – Tony Clayton-Lea".

Feeney first composed the songs and all of the orchestral parts, and then she conducted the orchestra in the recording. The orchestra, which included woodwinds, brass, strings, vibraphone and glockenspiel (among others), was recorded over two sessions in one day at the Irish Chamber Orchestra Studio in Limerick. Unusual about this album is that all of the instrumental music is played by the orchestra with no additional instruments or MIDI instruments. She later recorded all of the singing at home in her own studio, where she produced the album, which was mixed in her studio by Ger McDonnell. Feeney also did a small amount of re-mixing of the vocals on the album.

The Irish Times on 29 May 9 proclaimed, "She is an innovator, an original; incomparable with any of her contemporaries and she has created what might just be the Irish album of the year". The Sunday Tribune, METRO and the RTÉ Guide also gave it CD of the Week while Hot Press proclaimed that "pages ... is a wee masterpiece". The Washington Post's Express described Feeney as "The Emerald Isle's Original". The artwork for the digi-pack cover with booklet included photographs of Feeney wearing a hand-stitched dress sculpted from the pages of the composer's orchestral score by the artist Sharon Costello Desmond. The dress was worn by Feeney on the RTÉ television programme The View, hosted by John Kelly on 9 June 2009.

== Clocks (2012) ==
Feeney's third self-produced album, Clocks, was winner of 'Best Album 2012' in 'Album of the Year' in the international section of The Irish Times 'The Ticket Awards 2012' as voted by The Irish Times readers. Clocks was released in Ireland on her own 'mittens' label and it was widely highly critically acclaimed. It entered at number one on the Irish Independent Album Charts and number 7 on the Main Irish charts. It was also nominated for the Meteor Choice Music Prize for Irish Album of the Year 2012.

The Irish Times said of Clocks, "Feeney's stately pomp and charged intimacy that sums up Clocks best: both warm and weird, but incontestably individual". Hot Press proclaimed that Feeney's Clocks was a "superb third album from Ireland's national treasure". The Sunday Business Post said that, "Clocks is the best of her hugely impressive body of work. Evocative, full with subtly enticing key changes and telling story after story, this is sparse, reverent and varied stuff, but still accessible enough to fall under the genre heading of pop. Feeney has elements of trad, or at least thoughtful traditionalism, in her sound and lyrics: opener Dear John offers a moving take of her grandparents' simple courtship. At its best, Clocks is nearly flawless". Clocks was crowd-funded by 204 funders on Irish website Fundit and it is so far the most successful music project on the website.

A 2012 live performance from her 10-night run in New York City received a stellar review in The New York Times from chief pop music critic Jon Pareles.

== Compositional work ==
Feeney has been commissioned by Festival Firsts, a co-producing network between Galway Arts Festival, Dublin Theatre Festival, Cork Midsummer Festival and Kilkenny Arts Festival, to compose her first opera, Bird, and the first developmental stage was presented at Dublin Theatre Festival in October 2012. The second developmental stage was performed at a sold-out performance in Galway at Galway Arts Festival in 2013. Her instrumental compositions have been performed by Crash Ensemble and Icebreaker, and she composed and performed in an orchestral song cycle version of her first album, 13 songs, for her solo with the Ulster Orchestra at the Waterfront Hall in Belfast. She scored a song cycle for the RTÉ Concert Orchestra of her second album, pages, and this was broadcast live from RTÉ Radio studios on the JK Ensemble live on RTÉ lyric fm on 14 October 2010 as part of RTÉ Music Week. She performed her own self-orchestrated songs with the RTÉ Concert Orchestra from the National Concert Hall in May 2010 on 'Mooney Goes Wild' broadcast live on RTÉ Radio 1 and on 'Sunday Miscellany' on RTÉ Radio 1 broadcast live on 13 December 2011. She has subsequently also orchestrated her third album, Clocks, for the RTÉ Concert Orchestra and she performed it with the orchestra at the National Concert Hall in Dublin on 9 August 2013, including songs also from her previous two albums. She has composed electronic scores for Corp Feasa Contemporary Dance Company, Loose Canon Theatre Company and for her own one-woman shows where she incorporated live singing. She composed an electronic score for Match, which was one of the short contemporary dance films for RTÉ Television as part of the Dance on the Box series on RTÉ in 2006. She scored 10 choral arrangements of her music for a tour with 10 different choirs over 10 consecutive nights in 10 different towns in Ireland in November 2012 in collaboration with The Strollers' Touring Network. She briefly studied composition with Louis Andriessen at the Royal Conservatory of The Hague.

== Radio and television ==
In 2011, Feeney performed in the USA on NPR with her ensemble. She was interviewed on PRI's The World and on NPR station WBUR's "Here and Now". She did an interview on Q104.3 with Jonathan Clarke and was interviewed on SiriusXM in an hour-long interview with Bob Edwards on 5 October 2011.

She performs her own music and has been interviewed extensively on RTÉ radio and television, TV3, TG4, Newstalk, and BBC Northern Ireland as well as BBC Radio 4 Woman's Hour. She performed a solo voice and piano interpretation of the Irish lullaby "Seoithín, Seo Hó" on a special 2006 Christmas Day broadcast show JK Ensemble on RTÉ lyric fm. This performance was included on the charity album Tuesday's Child in 2007. "Impossibly Beautiful" from pages was on heavy rotation on RTÉ Radio 1 from 2009 to 2010. In 2011, she co-presented a 26-week radio series High Fidelity: a century of song with Jack L and Julie Feeney on RTÉ Lyric FM. The series was repeated on RTÉ Radio 1 in 2012. Her recording of her selected song, "New Tattoo", written by Tommy Moore for the RTÉ TV series The Hit in 2013, entered at No. 6 in the Irish Singles Chart.

== Music videos ==
"Just a Few Hours" from Clocks was made by Epic Productions in Cork "Galway Boy" from Clocks was directed by "Ogie" at Stormlight Production company and filmed by Justin MacCarthy. and "Julie Feeney : Paris".

Feeney received an IMTV Award for her fourth music video for her song "Impossibly Beautiful", which is the second track on pages. The video features 18 head-dresses designed by the designer Piers Atkinson and the video is directed by Vittoria Colonna. The video for "Love is a Tricky Thing" received an IMTV nomination for Best Irish Female and it was also directed by Vittoria Colonna. Maria Mochnacz directed Feeney's music video for the song "Aching", which was the first track from Feeney's 13 songs album and Colonna directed a music video for the song "Fictitious Richard", also taken from the album 13 songs. Feeney's music videos are self-funded by Feeney's own record label mittens.

== Choral singer ==
As a professional choral singer she has performed and recorded worldwide. She worked full-time with the National Chamber Choir of Ireland (specialising in contemporary and Early music), and she performed extensively with Anúna. She has also performed with the BBC singers, Riverdance, and Lord of the Dance (as lead soloist).

== Theatre ==
As a theatre artist she has performed in her own one-woman shows with her own electronic scores; with Loose Canon Theatre Company as a movement actor, and with Featherhead Productions' "Slat" at Galway Arts Festival. She also performed in "Slat" as part of La Saison Culturelle Européenne in Paris in November 2008.

In much of her theatre work she incorporates extended vocal technique. She works part-time as a model. In January 2011 she devised a duet with actor and director Mikel Murfi which was performed in University College Cork at the launch of its School of Music and Theatre, where she both acted and composed the musical score.

== Conductor ==
She conducted the strings of the Royal Liverpool Philharmonic Orchestra at the Royal Liverpool Philharmonic Hall where Feeney had orchestrated the scores.

She conducted the Irish Chamber Orchestra on her own pages album recording where she had also composed and orchestrated the music. The orchestra for the two sessions was expanded to 25 players and included woodwind, brass, percussion and harp.

== Education ==
Feeney has two master's degrees from Trinity College Dublin, one in Psychoanalysis from the Department of Mental and Moral Science and a Masters' in Music and Media Studies from the Department of Engineering. She studied Sonology at Royal Conservatory of The Hague at postgraduate level and briefly studied musical composition with Louis Andriessen. She has undergraduate degrees in music, Music and Psychology and is a qualified primary teaching teacher.

== Documentary ==
She is the featured composer in the documentary Splanc! – Cosán Dearg aired on TG4 in 2008. Cosan Dearg, a contemporary dance piece resulted from collaboration between Feeney, choreographer Fearghus Ó Conchúir, and theatre director Jason Byrne. She contributed her own piano arrangements of songs to the television documentary And The Red Poppies Dance, commissioned by RTÉ broadcast on its commemorative season 1918: Ireland and the Great War in November 2008. She was the subject of a special RTÉ television documentary, The View Presents Julie Feeney, which aired on 20 July 2010 with John Kelly.

== Discography ==
Studio albums

- 13 songs (2005)
- pages (2009) – IRL #26
- Clocks (2012) – IRL #7
- Cork Gamelan Ensemble – The Three Forges (Diatribe Records, 2015)

== Awards and accolades ==
=== Choice Music Prize ===
Year	Nominee / work	Award	Result
2006	13 songs	Irish Album of the Year	Won
2009	pages	Irish Album of the Year	Nominated
2012	Clocks	Irish Album of the Year	Nominated

=== Meteor Music Awards ===
Year	Nominee / work	Award	Result
2010	Julie Feeney	Best Irish Female	Nominated

=== IMTV Awards ===
Year	Nominee / work	Award	Result
2009	"Impossibly Beautiful"	Best Styled Music Video	Won
2009	"Love is a Tricky Thing"	Best Irish Female	Nominated

- Winner TOYP, 'The Outstanding Young Person Award for Cultural Achievement' by Junior Chamber International in 2008.
- Winner 'Irish Tatler Woman of the Year for Music and Entertainment' in 2006.

== Use of songs on TV ==
- "You Bring Me Down" from 13 songs featured on Match of the Day on BBC 2 in May 2006.
- "You Broke The Magic" from 13 songs featured on RTÉ TV drama Little White Lie in 2008.
- "Impossibly Beautiful" from pages features on major Irish TV and radio commercial VHI's one plan.

== Work in education ==
As an educator Feeney has worked at primary, secondary, university and professional development level in music and mainstream education. A qualified primary teacher, she has designed and facilitated workshops all over Ireland, in the US and in Brazil and has published three music education CD-ROMs. She lectured in music education at university level for three years.
