= Silverbacks (band) =

Irish psych rock band

- Origin: Dublin, Ireland
- Genres: Post-punk, no wave, indie rock, alternative rock, art punk
- Years active: 2017–present
- Labels: Full Time Hobby, Nice Swan, Central Tones, Cargo
- Members: Daniel O'Kelly; Emma Hanlon; Kilian O'Kelly; Paul Leamy; Gary Wickham; Peader Kearney
- Website: silverbacksband.com

Silverbacks are an Irish post-punk band, with members based in County Kildare, Drogheda and Paris.

== Career ==
Silverbacks were founded in 2018 by brothers Daniel and Kilian O'Kelly, gradually growing to a six-piece. Their first album, Fad, came out in 2020, receiving four stars out of five from The Irish Times and being nominated for the Choice Music Prize.

The Irish Times compared their style to Television, Talking Heads and The Fall.

The second album, Archive Material, was released in 2022.

Their third album, Easy Being a Winner, was released in 2024 and was also nominated for the Choice Music Prize.

== Personnel ==
- Daniel O'Kelly (vocals, guitar)
- Emma Hanlon (backing vocals)
- Kilian O'Kelly (guitar)
- Paul Leamy (bass)
- Gary Wickham (drums)
- Peader Kearney (guitar)

== Discography ==
EP

- Sink The Fat Moon (2017)
- She Cut Her Hair (2021)

Albums

- Fad (2020)
- Archive Material (2022)
- Easy Being a Winner (2024)
