= HousePlants =

Irish psych rock band

- Origin: Dublin
- Genres: electronic; dance; indie
- Years active: 2020–present
- Members: Paul Noonan; Daithí
- Website: houseplants.band

HousePlants are an Irish electronic duo formed by Paul Noonan and Daithí.

== Career ==
HousePlants were founded in 2020. Their debut album, Dry Goods, was nominated for the Choice Music Prize. They released an EP, Seaglass, the following year, and their second album, Half Known Things, in 2024.

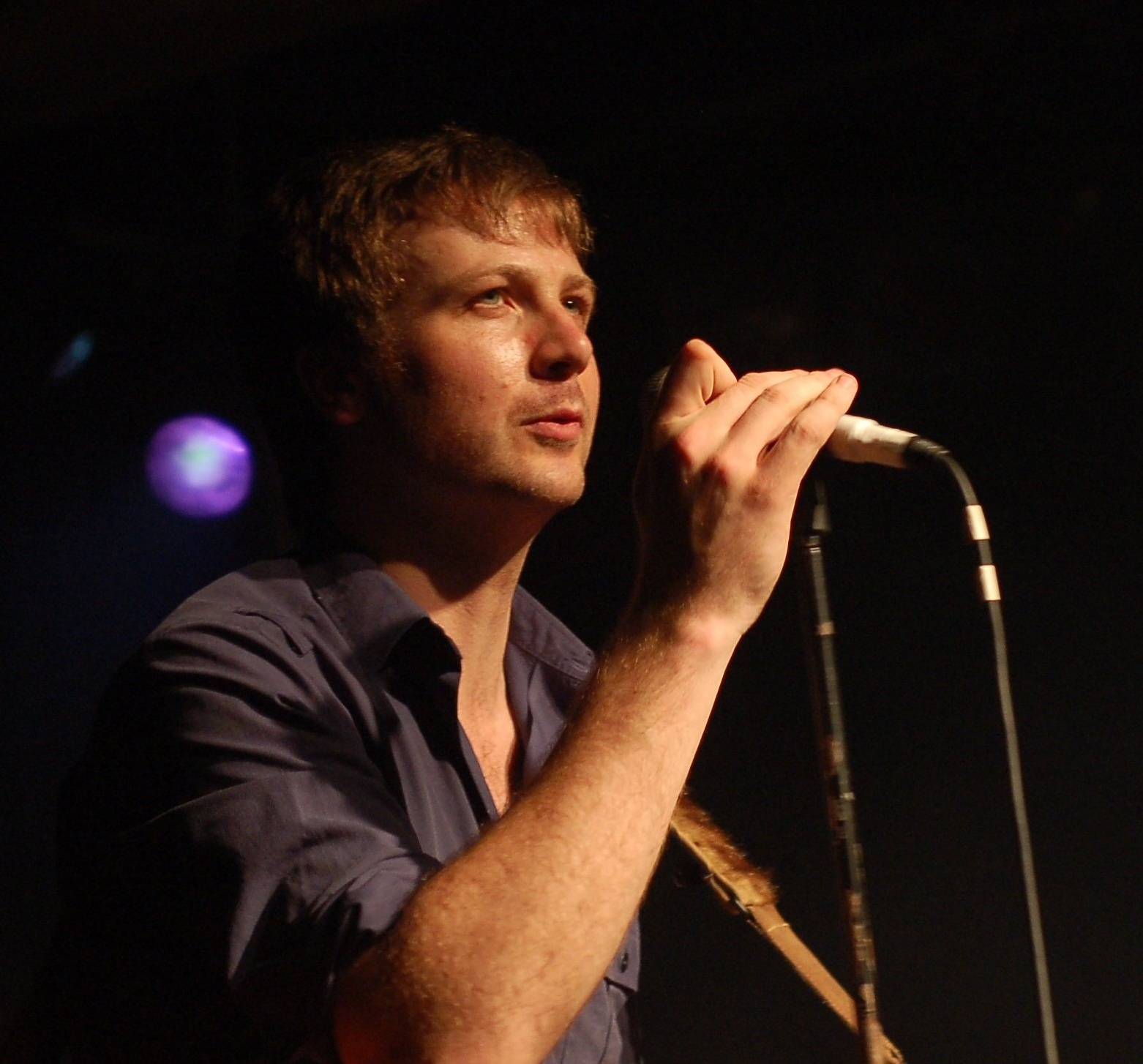
Paul Noonan

== Discography ==
EP

- Seaglass (2022)

Albums

- Dry Goods (2021)
- Half Known Things (2024)
