= The Cast of Cheers =

Irish rock band

Background information
- Origin: Sligo/Dublin, Ireland
- Genres: Math rock, indie rock
- Years active: 2009–present
- Label: Schoolboy Error (UK)
- Members: Conor Adams; Neil Adams; John Higgins; Kevin Curran

The Cast of Cheers are a four-piece indie/math rock band from Sligo and Dublin, Ireland, composed of Conor Adams (vocals, guitar), Neil Adams (guitar, vocals), John Higgins (bass, vocals) and Kevin Curran (drums).

== History (2009 - present) ==
The Cast of Cheers were formed in 2009 in Dublin, Ireland, by lead vocalist Conor Adams and bassist John Higgins, who recruited Kevin Curran on drums and, after the recording of their début album, they asked Conor's brother, Neil Adams, to play guitar live. They released their first album Chariot in February 2010 on bandcamp.com for free. It received over 150,000 downloads and netted them a nomination at the Choice Music Awards. Their second album, Family, was produced by Luke Smith, ex of Clor and was released on 20 July 2012 through Schoolboy Error/Co-Operative Music, and debuted at number 37 on the Irish Album Charts.

To date they have supported Blood Red Shoes, Howler, Bloc Party, Alt-J, Two Door Cinema Club and Bombay Bicycle Club.

== Members ==
- Conor Adams – Lead vocals, guitar
- Neil Adams – Lead guitar, vocals
- John Higgins – Bass, vocals
- Kevin Curran - Drums, percussion

== Discography ==
The Cast of Cheers discography
- Studio albums: 2
- Singles: 4
- Music videos: 4

=== Albums ===
Year	Album details	Peak chart positions
Year	Album details	IRL
2010	Chariot: Released: February 2010; Label: Self Released; Formats: Download	—
2012	Family: Released: 20 July 2012; Label: Schoolboy Error; Formats: CD, Download, 7" Vinyl	37
"—" denotes a title that did not chart.

=== Singles ===
Year	Title	Peak chart position	Album
Year	Title	IRL	Album
2012	"Family"	—	Family
2012	"Animals"	—	Family
2012	"Human Elevator"	—	Family
2012	"Trucks At Night"	—	Family
"—" denotes a title that did not chart.

== Awards ==
=== Choice Music Prize ===
The Cast of Cheers debut album, Chariot, was nominated for the Choice Music Prize in January 2010.

Year	Nominee / work	Award	Result
2010	Chariot	Irish Album of the Year 2010	Nominated
