= Ailbhe Reddy =

Irish singer-songwriter from Dublin

- Born: 1991 (age 34–35); Dublin, Ireland
- Genres: indie folk
- Occupation: Singer-songwriter
- Instrument: Guitar
- Years active: 2016–present
- Label: Friends of the Family
- Website: ailbhereddy.com

Ailbhe Reddy (/ˈælvə/, AL-va; born 1991) is an Irish indie folk singer-songwriter from Dublin.

== Early life ==
Reddy grew up in Dublin. She originally planned to be a secondary school teacher and studied Irish and history, but later went back and got a psychotherapy degree and moved into music.

== Career ==
Reddy did not perform until she was 22 due to shyness. She released her first LP in 2016, which received a 10/10 rating from The Last Mixed Tape.

She cites Big Thief, Julia Jacklin, Jeff Buckley, The Shins and Andy Shauf as inspirations.

Her debut album Personal History was nominated for the Choice Music Prize.

Her second album Endless Affair received 9/10 from Hot Press.

== Personal life ==
Reddy is a lesbian. She is based in Dublin and London.

== Discography ==
Studio albums

- Personal History (2020)
- Endless Affair (2023)
- Kiss Big (2026)

EPs

- Hollowed Out Sea (2016)
