= Thumper (band) =

Irish psych rock band

THUMPER
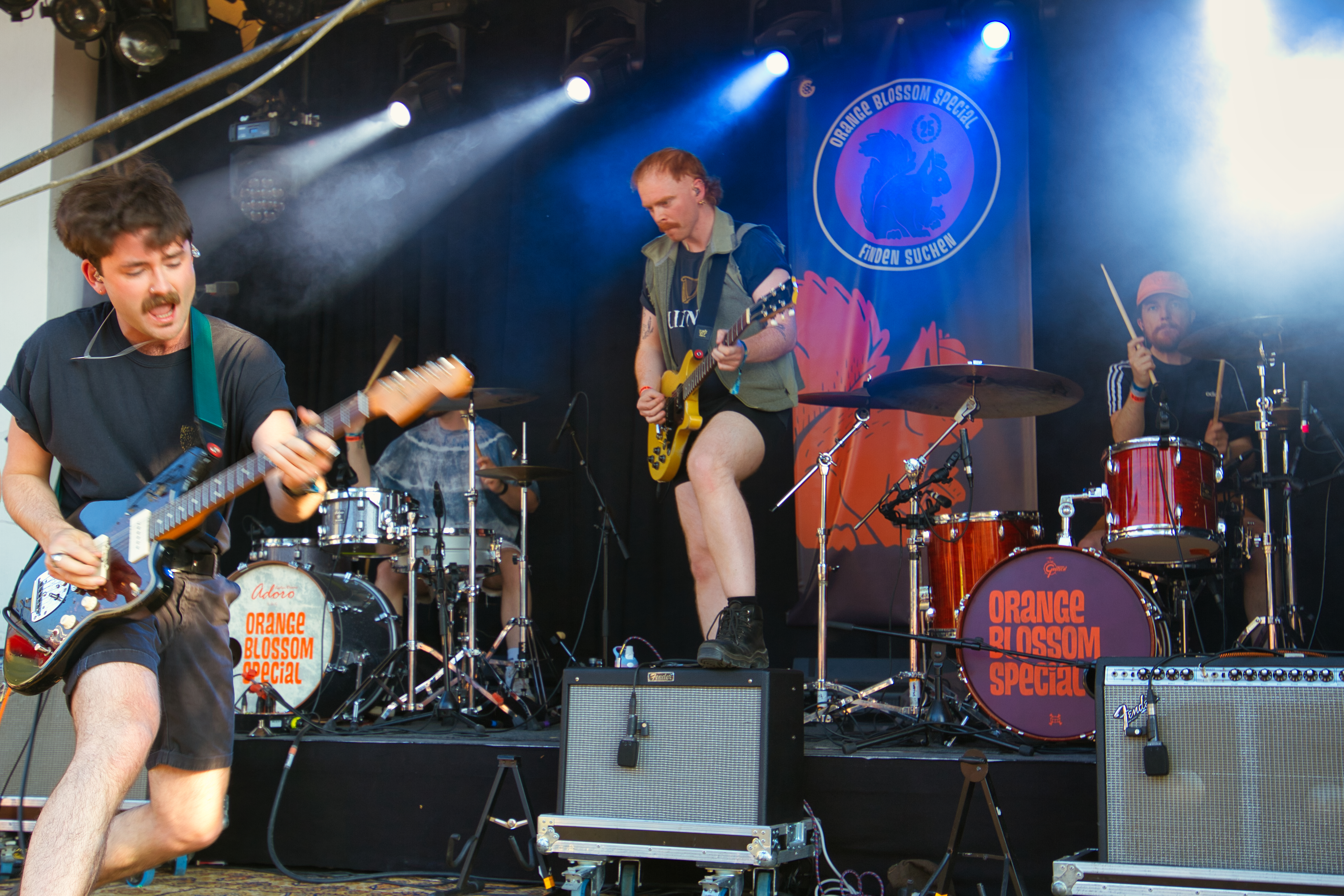
- THUMPER at the 2023 Orange Blossom Special Festival

Background information
- Origin: Dublin
- Genres: rock; noise pop; psych rock; guitar rock
- Years active: 2019–2026
- Label: EMMS
- Members: Oisín Leahy Furlong; Alan Dooley; Alex Harvey; Benedict Warner-Clayton; Dav Campbell; Stevie D'Arcy
- Website: hellothumper.com

Thumper (stylised in all-caps as THUMPER) were an Irish psych rock band based in Dublin.

== Career ==
THUMPER was founded in 2019 as a solo project by Oisín Leahy Furlong, who then formed the band to perform the songs at festivals.

They cite Weezer, Pixies, Pavement and The Dandy Warhols as influences. THUMPER have made festival appearances at Reading and Leeds Festival, Electric Picnic, Indiependence, All Together Now, VESTROCK and Haldern Pop.

Their first album, Delusions of Grandeur, was released in 2022 and was nominated for the Choice Music Prize. The Irish Times awarded it three stars out of five, saying "While the riffs are punchy, there’s a serious timekeeping issue […] With six years of material to work with, it’s no wonder this debut record is overstuffed with ideas. Nonetheless, Thumper have carved out a corner of Ireland’s burgeoning guitar rock scene by maintaining a strong sense of self." The Irish Examiner gave it 4/5, saying " amidst the din, their debut album is full of wonky avant-garde flourishes. At its best, it tips into a goggle-eyed weirdness that will help set Thumper apart from the deluge of groups that have come to attention in the wake of Fontaines DC." Hot Press gave it 8/10, saying "Combining millennial angst and compulsive, turbo-driven guitar, THUMPER are at their best when they let their psych-tinged epics breathe."

== Personnel ==
- Oisín Leahy Furlong (vocals, guitar)
- Alan Dooley (guitar, backing vocals)
- Alex Harvey (guitar, backing vocals)
- Dav Campbell (bass, backing vocals)
- Stevie D'Arcy (drums)
- Benedict Warner-Clayton (drums)

== Discography ==
EPs

- Out of Body Auto-Message (2019)

Albums

- Delusions of Grandeur (2022)
- Sleeping With the Light On (2026)
