= Musba Hashmi =

Indian Journalist

- Born: August 10, 1996 (age 25); Agra, Uttar Pradesh
- Education: Amity University
- Occupation: Editor-in-Chief of Web News Observer

Musba Hashmi is an Indian journalist and the editor-in-chief of a Mysore-based media outlet Web News Observer. She was born on August 10, 1996, and attended the Amity University, graduating in 2017. Before joining Web News Observer, she has worked with The Pioneer and Pinkvilla as a Journalist.
