= Stanley Super 800 =

Irish indie rock band

- Origin: Cork, Ireland
- Genre: Indie-Alternative-Electro
- Years active: 2003–2008
- Labels: Sofa Records; Acoustianity
- Spinoff of: The Céilí Allstars
- Past members: Eoin 'Stan' O'Sullivan; Mike 'Tosh' O'Sullivan; Flor Rahilly; Dave Hackett

Stanley Super 800 were an Irish band from Cork formed in 2003 by Eoin 'Stan' O'Sullivan, formerly of Cork indie rock band, The Shanks. The group's second album, Louder & Clearer, received a nomination for the 2007 Choice Music Prize.

== Discography ==
=== EPs ===
- Moonlight (2003)

=== Studio albums ===
- Stanley Super 800 (2004)
- Louder & Clearer (2007)
- Starry (Compilation Album) (2024)
