= Murli, Bihar =

Murli
- Village
- Location within Bihar
- Coordinates: 27.108°N 84.464°E
- Country: India
- State: Bihar
- District: West Champaran district

Languages
  - Official: Hindi
- Time zone: UTC+5:30 (IST)
- ISO 3166 code: IN-BR

Murli is a village in West Champaran district in the Indian state of Bihar.

== Demographics ==
As of the 2011 census of India, Murli had a population of 875 in 184 households. Males constitute 51.2% of the population and females 48.7%. Murli has an average literacy rate of 53.9%, lower than the national average of 74%: male literacy is 55%, and female literacy is 44%. In Murli, 18.8% of the population is under 6 years of age.
