= Louder & Clearer =

Studio album by Stanley Super 800
- Released: April 2007
- Genre: Indie-Alternative-Electro
- Label: Sofa Records

Stanley Super 800 chronology
Stanley Super 800 (2004)	Louder & Clearer (2007)

Louder & Clearer is the second album by band Stanley Super 800. It was nominated for the Choice Music Prize for Irish Album of the Year 2007.

== Track listing ==
1. "Introducing"
2. "Gatecrashing"
3. "Moonlight"
4. "Stars Come Out"
5. "Dark Angel"
6. "Voices In The Music"
7. "Hello"
8. "33 Seconds"
9. "Only You"
10. "Colour Test"
11. "Love x 3"
12. "A23"
13. "South Wind"
