= Niamh Regan =

Irish singer-songwriter

- Born: 1994 (age 31–32); Ireland
- Occupation: Singer-songwriter
- Instruments: Vocals; piano; guitar
- Years active: 2020–present
- Labels: Black Gate, Faction Music
- Website: niamhregan.com

Niamh Regan (/ˈniːv ˈriːɡən/; born 1994) is an Irish singer songwriter from County Galway.

== Early life ==
Regan grew up in Kilreekill. In 2008, age 13, she appeared on the RTÉ children's talent show Class Act. She received a BA in Music in the Irish World Academy of Music and Dance at the University of Limerick. She then qualified as a teacher through Hibernia College and was not planning a musical career until the COVID lockdowns.

== Career ==
In 2020 Regan released her debut album Hemet, recorded during the COVID lockdowns. It was nominated for the Choice Music Prize.

Her second album Come As You Are, recorded at Attica Audio Recording in Letterkenny, was also nominated for the Choice Music Prize.

== Discography ==
Studio albums

- Hemet (2020)
- Come As You Are (2024)

EPs

- In the Meantime (2022)

== Personal life ==
Regan is married to Wesley Houdyshell from Hemet, California, which is the origin of the name of her first album.
