= O Emperor =

Irish rock band

- Origin: Waterford, Ireland
- Genres: Rock, progressive rock, psychedelic rock, folk rock
- Label: Big Skin Records,
- Website: oemperor.com

Professional ratings
Review scores
Source	Rating
Entertainment.ie	3.5/5 stars
Irish Times	4/5 stars

O Emperor are a rock band from Waterford, Ireland.

== History ==
=== Background ===
O Emperor are a five-piece rock band from Waterford, Ireland. All members met in secondary school in Waterford and for these years went under a number of guises, performing covers in pubs and clubs throughout Waterford city. The five went to college in Cork and during this period, evolved into an original outfit now called O Emperor in 2009.

=== Debut album: Hither Thither ===
Hither Thither was record after the individual members left college in 2009. The group located to a country house in Kinsale, County Cork and over the course of 9 months, self recorded and produced their debut album. The record was released through Universal Records Ireland in October 2010 and went on to the nominated for a Choice Music Prize (Irish Album of the Year 2010)

=== Present ===
The group spent most of 2012 recording material for their second album Vitreous, which was released on June 14, 2013. Two tracks from this session Electric Tongues/Erman Gou were issued as a standalone double A-side single in November 2012.

Vitreous was self-recorded and produced in the band's studio (Big Skin HQ) in Cork city. It has been received positively by fans and described as "the band's most potent and distinct work to date."

In March 2015, the EP Lizard was released.

== Discography ==
=== Studio albums ===
Year	Album details	Peak chart positions	Certifications
Year	Album details	IRL	Certifications
2010	Hither Thither: Released: October 1, 2010; Label: Universal Music Ireland; Formats: CD, digital download	6	
2012	Hither Thither (Expanded Version): Released: April 16, 2012; Label: K&F Records; Formats: CD, digital download	—	
2013	Vitreous: Released: June 14, 2013; Label: BigSkin; Formats: CD, digital download, LP	38	
2018	Jason: Released: November 2, 2018; Label: BigSkin; Formats: CD, digital download	—	
"—" denotes a title that did not chart.

=== Extended plays ===
Year	Album details	Peak chart positions
Year	Album details	IRL
2010	Persephone: Released: January 13, 2010; Label: Self Released; Formats: CD	—
2010	Reverie: Released: April 16, 2010; Label: Universal Ireland; Formats: CD, digital download	32
2015	Lizard: Released: March 2, 2015; Label: BigSkin; Formats: CD (Only on stage), digital download	—
2015	"—" denotes a title that did not chart.	
