= Rachael Lavelle =

Irish singer-songwriter from Dublin

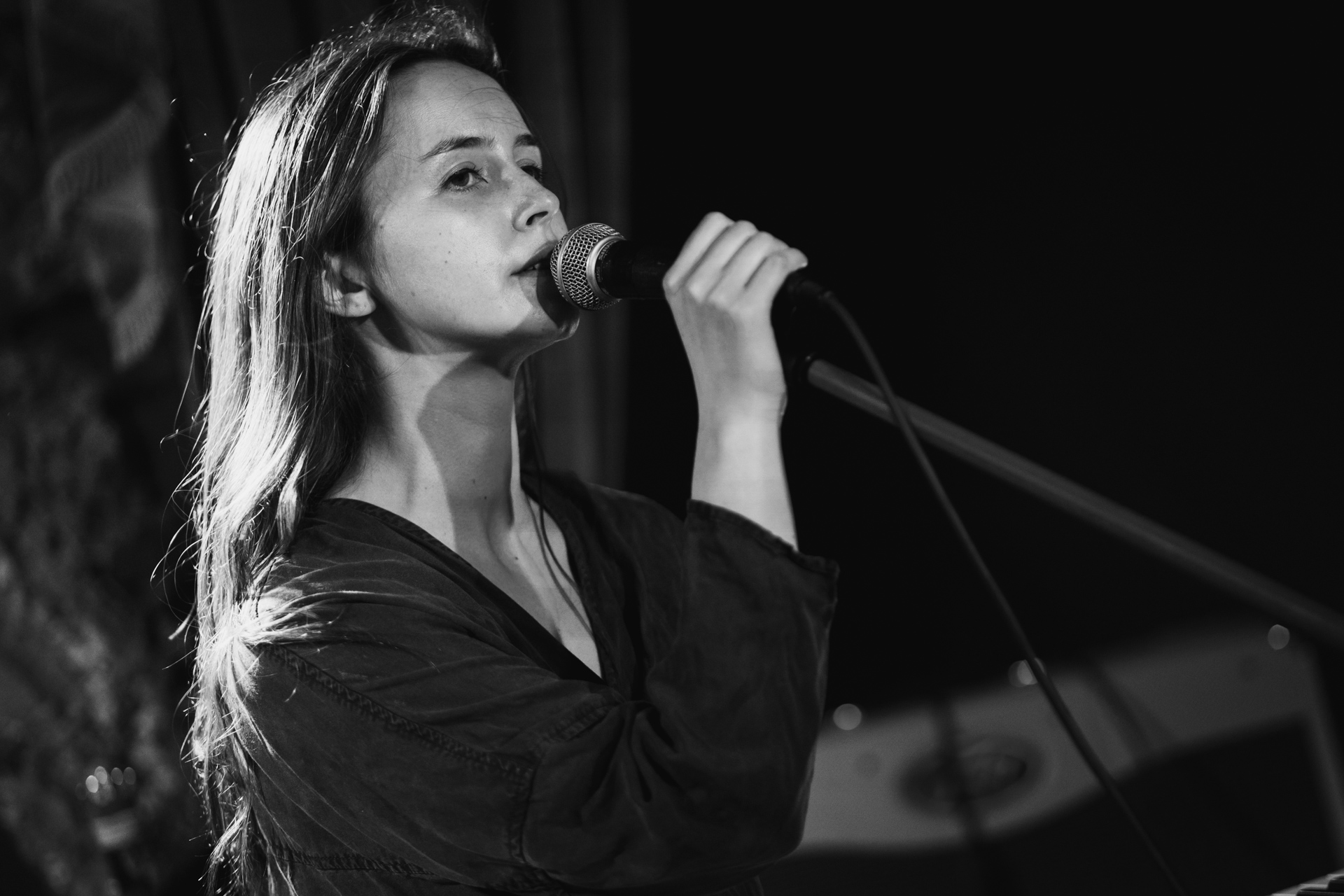
- Lavelle in 2024

Background information
- Born: Rachael Lavelle; 1993 (age 32–33); Dublin, Ireland
- Genres: alternative; art pop
- Occupation: Singer-songwriter
- Instruments: Vocals; keyboard
- Years active: 2015–present
- Label: Rest Energy
- Website: rachaellavelle.com

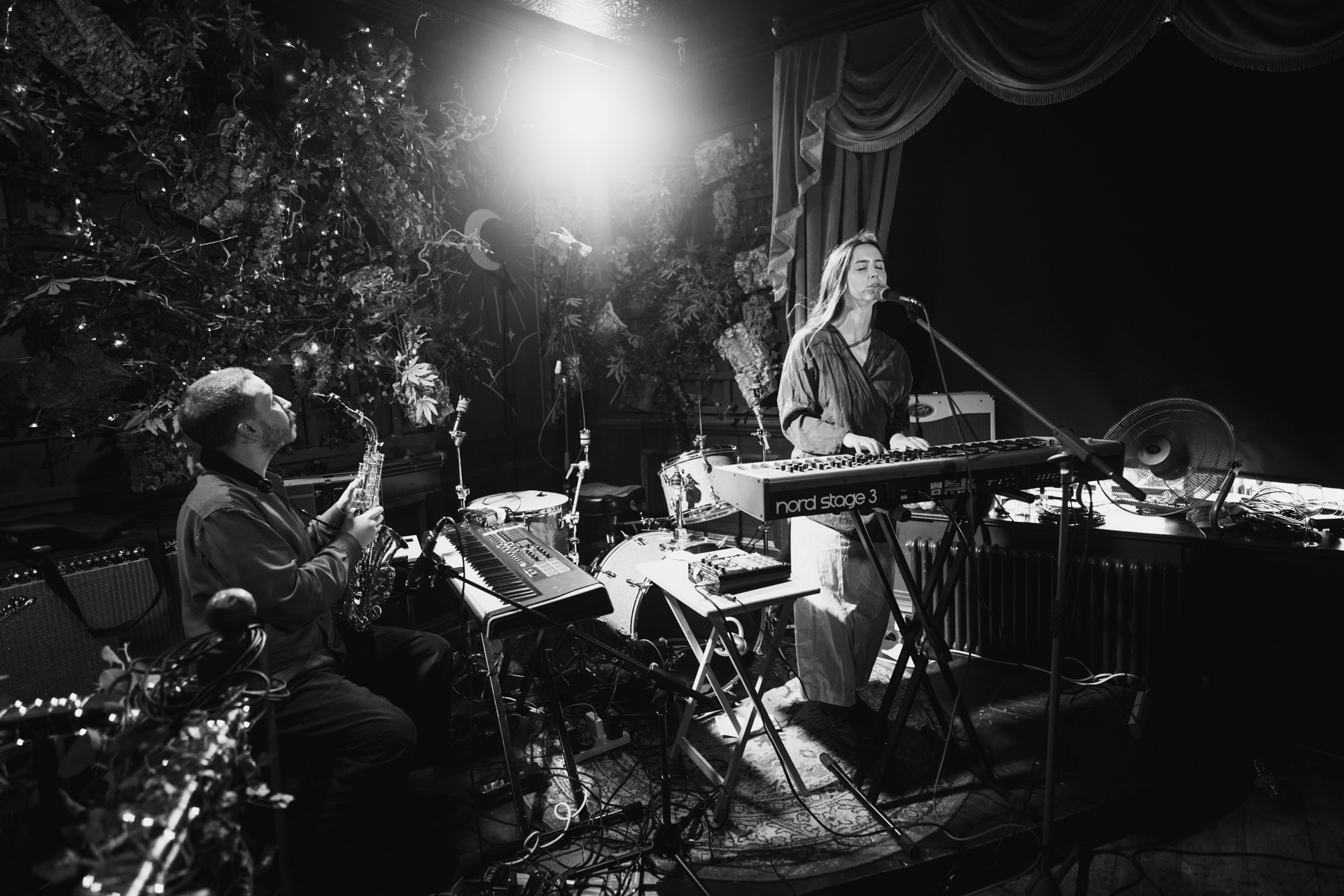
Lavelle with band

Rachael Lavelle (born 1993) is an Irish singer and composer from Dublin.

== Early life ==
Rachael Lavelle grew up in Dublin. Her grandfather was the composer and songwriter Michael Coffey, who wrote Ireland's 1967 Eurovision entry and the musical comedy Carrie.

She studied Sociology and Italian at Trinity College Dublin, and later completed a Master's in Music and Media Technology.

== Career ==
In 2015 Lavelle recorded an EP in Italy, and her 2019 single "Perpetual Party" attracted positive attention.

Her debut album Big Dreams was nominated for the Choice Music Prize.

== Discography ==
Studio albums

- Big Dreams (2023)

EPs

- Superman (2015)
