= Alias Empire =

Irish band

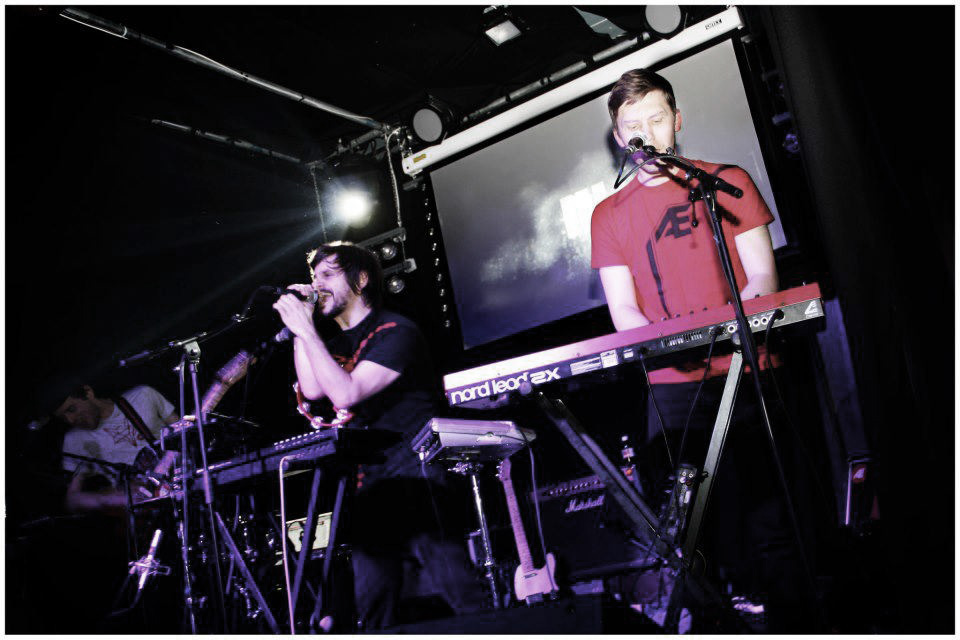

Background information
- Also known as: Dry County
- Origin: Dublin, Ireland
- Genres: Electronic, alternative rock
- Years active: 2002–present
- Members: Kevin Littlewood; Stuart Flood; Phil Porter
- Past members: Derek Cosgrave; Joanne Parle
- Website: www.aliasempire.com

Alias Empire are an Irish alternative electronic band based in Dublin. Formed in 2002, the band consists of Kevin Littlewood, Phil Porter and Stuart Flood. The band originally formed under the name Dry County, changing their name in 2008.

Alias Empire have released three studio albums: Unexpected Falls (2007), Safety in Numbers (2013) and "Focus" (2015)

== History ==
=== 2004–2007: Unexpected Falls ===
The band recorded Unexpected Falls in various houses around Ireland. The album was a critical success and earned the band a Choice Music Prize nomination in January 2008. The subsequent tour culminated with Dry County headlining the IMRO stage at Ireland's Oxegen festival in 2008. The band announced at a farewell show in Whelan's, Dublin, that they would be changing their name to Alias Empire.

=== 2013 – present: Safety in Numbers ===
Safety in Numbers was released on 12 April 2013, and received positive reviews.

== Style and influences ==
Alias Empire are known for their captivating audio-visual live performances, which have been referred to as "one of the most powerful shows in current Irish music". Their live shows have been known to incorporate both live and programmed percussion, extensive use of synthesisers and visuals.

== Discography ==
- Bury Your Head EP (2002)
- Nothing Stays in Place EP (2004)
- Unexpected Falls (2007)
- Safety in Numbers (2013)
- Focus (2015)
