= Super Extra Bonus Party =

Irish band

- Super Extra Bonus Party

Background information
- Origin: Newbridge, Kildare, Ireland
- Genre: Indie-electronica
- Years active: 2005–2011; 2015 - present
- Label: Alphabet Set PIE
- Members: Cormac Brady; Stephen Fahey; Gavin Elsted; Gary Clarke
- Past members: Cons Henry; Steve Conlan; Rodrigo Teles; Mike Donnelly; Sean Corcoran

Super Extra Bonus Party are a Choice Music Prize winning indie-electronica band, formed in November 2005 and based in Kildare, Ireland. Their music spanned various genres such as electronica, indie and hip hop. Their debut album Super Extra Bonus Party LP was released to widespread critical acclaim, winning the 2007 Choice Music Prize and considered "the most inventive Irish album this decade."

Aside from headline shows, the band played with the likes of The Go! Team, Cadence Weapon, Bonde do Rolê, Subtle and Alec Empire as well as slots at Electric Picnic in 2007 and 2008. The band's second album, Night Horses, was released in 2009. Super Extra Bonus Party announced an indefinite hiatus in 2011.

The band returned with a trio of singles 'Switzerland' (2017), 'Purple Heart' (2018), and 'Some Dark Forces' feat. Sorca from Ships (2019). They also performed at the Body & Soul, Castlepalooza, and Electric Picnic festivals in 2018.

On 29 September 2023 the band will release their third album, 'Late Nite 99'. To support the release the band will perform a number of shows across Ireland, including an exclusive invite-only event which will see the band play on the back of a truck outside Monasterevin Shopping Centre.

== History ==
The band first started as a duo, with Cormac and Mike producing electronic music under the moniker Illegal Kids.

Their songs appeared on two compilations in 2004: Eklectra on Elusive Recordings and Wooden Educational on Alphabet Set.

In 2005, Stephen joined the group, the group's name was changed to Super Extra Bonus Party and a demo was put together. Shortly afterwards, Brazilian MC Rodrigo and Gavin joined the band and they began to work on a debut album.

The debut album was written, recorded and produced in the house where the band lived together in late 2006 and early 2007.

It featured collaborations with various Irish musicians, such as Nina Hynes, Paul O' Reilly (Channel One), Iain Defector (Kill City Defectors) and human beatbox White Noise.

After the release of Super Extra Bonus Party LP, the line-up was supplemented by Steve Conlan on guitar and Cons Henry on drums, which also expanded their live show significantly.

In late 2007, Cons Henry left the band to concentrate on other commitments. Gary Clarke was brought in as a replacement.

In January 2008, the band were nominated for the Choice Music Prize for their debut album, which they won on 27 February 2008.

The band released a remix album entitled Appetite for Reconstruction for free download which featured remixes from Cadence Weapon, Jape and Nouveaunoise amongst others in late 2008.

In May 2009, they released their second album, Night Horses, which features contributions from Cadence Weapon, Mr. Lif, Heathers, May Kay of Fight Like Apes, R.S.A.G, Captain Moonlight, Ann Scott and White Noise.

In June 2011, Super Extra Bonus Party announced an indefinite hiatus.

In March 2015, a picture was posted of the group together and an announcement was made that the band had reconvened. In November 2017, they released 'Switzerland' as a digital single on 045 Recordings, followed by 'Purple Heart' & 'Some Dark Forces' (feat. Sorca from Ships).

In May 2023, Super Extra Bonus Party released 'The Corpse', the first single from their third album 'Late Nite 99', which is due for release in September 2023.

== Discography ==
Super Extra Bonus Party discography
- Studio albums: 2
- Extended plays: 2
- Compilation albums: 1

=== Albums ===
Year	Album details	Peak chart positions
Year	Album details	IRL.
2007	Super Extra Bonus Party LP: Released: 13 April 2007; Label: Alphabet Set; Formats: CD, Download	—
2009	Night Horses: Released: 2009; Label: Alphabet Set; Formats: CD, Download	—
"—" denotes a title that did not chart.

=== Compilation albums ===
- Appetite for Reconstruction (Remix LP) (2008)

=== EPs ===
- Super Extra Bonus Party EP (2006)
- Everything Flows EP 12" (2008)
