= Pillow Queens =

Irish indie rock band

- Origin: Dublin, Ireland
- Genre: Indie rock
- Years active: 2016–present
- Label: Royal Mountain Records
- Members: Sarah Corcoran; Cathy McGuinness; Pamela Connolly
- Past members: Rachel Lyons
- Website: Official website

Pillow Queens are an Irish indie rock band from Dublin, formed in 2016. The band is composed of co-lead vocalists Pamela Connolly and Sarah Corcoran (who both swap between playing rhythm guitar and bass), and lead guitarist/backing vocalist Cathy McGuinness.

The band have been praised for their lyrical content, which often reckons with an Irish Catholic upbringing mixed with the band members themselves being openly LGBT. NME noted that the band "explore the intersection of religion and queerness", while The Guardian noted that the band "acknowledges the psychological challenge of adapting to even positive social change after a lifetime conditioned in its opposite".

The band released their debut album, In Waiting, in 2020. It received critical acclaim, with The Irish Times deeming it "an emotional masterpiece". A second LP, Leave the Light On, was released in April 2022. Their third full-length, Name Your Sorrow, was released in April 2024 on Royal Mountain Records.

== History ==
Pillow Queens was started by Sarah Corcoran and Pamela Connolly. After leaving their previous bands, the two wanted to go further with their new band, which they decided would consist of four queer women. They were then joined by Cathy McGuinness and Rachel Lyons, who they had known for years. In late 2016, the group released their first demo EP entitled Calm Girls. The release of this record was followed by performances on the Irish festival circuit, including at Electric Picnic and All Together Now. After the release of their second EP, State of the State, the group performed with the likes of Pussy Riot, Future Islands, Idles and performed in the IMRO room at Other Voices.

In a mid-2019 interview with RTÉ, the band stated that they were in the studio working on their debut LP, tentatively due to be released in mid-2020. On 1 November 2019, Pillow Queens released the single "Brothers", and the accompanying "Brothers (Acoustic)". The band played two further songs from their upcoming album, "Child of Prague" and "Liffey", on 9 November 2019 during a set in Reykjavík as part of Iceland Airwaves 2019.

In 2020, their single "Gay Girls" featured on the soundtrack to the Amazon Original Irish film Dating Amber. That year, the band also were part of Irish Women in Harmony, an Irish collective of female singers and musicians that recorded a version of "Dreams" in aid of the charity SafeIreland, which deals with domestic abuse which had reportedly risen significantly during the COVID-19 lockdown.

The band announced on 10 February 2021 that they had signed to the record label Sub Pop's publishing arm and confirmed in August of that year they had begun recording their second LP. The following month, the band released a new single, a re-recorded version of the song "Rats" from their Calm Girls EP. The band also simultaneously signed to Royal Mountain Records.

In January 2022, the band announced their second studio album Leave the Light On. Its lead single, "Be by Your Side", was released the same day. A second single, "Hearts & Minds", followed in February. A third single, "No Good Woman" was released in March. The album was released on 1 April 2022.

In November 2023, Pillow Queens released the single "Suffer", followed by the announcement of their third LP, Name Your Sorrow, in January 2024. Their album was announced with lead single "Gone" in January 2024. They released two successive singles "Like a Lesson" and "Heavy Pour," with the album releasing on 19 April 2024 on Royal Mountain Records.

== Style ==
The band has broad influences; however, they have been hesitant to define their work as any one genre, in order to avoid being labeled.

Pillow Queens have been described by Paste magazine as having a "sonic palette" crossed with "ragged-edged" guitars, combined with "smooth harmonies".

== Members ==
Current members

- Sarah Corcoran – lead vocals, rhythm guitar, bass (2016–present)
- Cathy McGuinness − lead guitar, backing vocals (2016–present)
- Pamela Connolly – lead vocals, rhythm guitar, bass (2016–present)

Current touring musicians

- Darragh Tibbs – drums (2024–present)

Former members

- Rachel Lyons – drums, backing vocals (2016–2024)

== Discography ==
=== Studio albums ===
Title	Album details	Peak chart positions
Title	Album details	IRE
In Waiting	Released: 25 September 2020; Label: Pillow Queens Records; Format: CD, digital download, vinyl	26
Leave the Light On	Released: 1 April 2022; Label: Royal Mountain; Format: CD, digital download, vinyl, streaming	3
Name Your Sorrow	Released: 19 April 2024; Label: Royal Mountain; Format: CD, digital download, vinyl, streaming	43

=== Extended plays ===
Title	EP details
Calm Girls	Release: 6 December 2016; Label: Any Other City; Format: CD, digital download
State of the State	Release: 15 December 2018; Label: Any Other City; Format: CD, digital download, vinyl

=== Singles ===
Title	Year	Album
"Favourite"	2018	State of the State
"Gay Girls"	2018	In Waiting
"HowDoILook"	2019	In Waiting
"Brothers"	2019	In Waiting
"Handsome Wife"	2020	In Waiting
"Holy Show"	2020	In Waiting
"Rats"	2021	Non-album single
"Be by Your Side"	2022	Leave The Light On
"Hearts & Minds"	2022	Leave The Light On
"No Good Woman"	2022	Leave The Light On
"Suffer"	2023	Name Your Sorrow
"Gone"	2024	Name Your Sorrow
"Like A Lesson"	2024	Name Your Sorrow
"Heavy Pour"	2024	Name Your Sorrow
