= Totally Dublin =

Irish freesheet magazine

- Type: Free monthly magazine
- Founder: Stefan Hallenius
- Publisher: HKM Media
- Editor: John Brereton (2024)
- Staff writers: 9 contributors
- Founded: 2004; 22 years ago
- Headquarters: 73 Leeson Street Lower; Dublin 2 D02 X524
- Circulation: 50,000 copies circulated per month (2024)
- Website: www.totallydublin.ie

Totally Dublin is a free monthly magazine, distributed in Dublin, Ireland. The magazine was founded in 2004 by Swedish publisher Stefan Hallenius.

== History ==
The official HKM Media webpage for the magazine claims that it launched in November 2004, whereas an article in The Irish Examiner claims that its first issue was published on 29 September 2004.

According to the magazine itself, it is the city's "most widely-read, highly-distributed culture freesheet", and covers city-wide events, stories and subjects both north and south of the river. HKM claims the magazine to be "the market-leader in free publications" in Dublin, and that its "strategy of emphasising editorial independence over advertising has contributed to its success". Subjects of articles that appear in the magazine include music, art, film, fashion, culture, listings and reviews.

In the run-up to the 2015 Irish constitutional referendum on same-sex marriage, The Irish Times noted that an interview published in Totally Dublin with Anne Connolly, a prominent liberal activist, helped the Yes Equality campaign learn how best to temper their approach in the sensitive debate.

The company also publishes the magazines Totally Stockholm and Totally Örebro.

== Distribution ==
The magazine is made available from 400 distribution points every month, including hotels, bars, restaurants and offices in the city.

== Awards ==
Totally Dublin's online presence www.totallydublin.ie won 'Best Online Publication' at the Realex Web Awards in 2012.

== See also ==
- List of magazines in Ireland
