= The Clare People =

- Type: Weekly regional newspaper
- Format: Tabloid
- Founded: 2005
- Ceased publication: 2019
- Headquarters: Mill Road, Ennis, County Clare
- Website: www.clarepeople.com

The Clare People was an Irish weekly regional newspaper founded in June 2005. It was published every Tuesday and sold mainly in County Clare. It published Clare related news, sport and events. It announced that it had published its final print edition on 13 August 2019.

The newspaper's headquarters were located in Ennis, County Clare.
