= Rusangano Family =

Irish synth-pop-disco duo

- Origin: Limerick
- Genres: Hip hop; dancehall; grime
- Years active: 2014–present
- Members: God Knows; MuRli; MynameisjOhn
- Website: Rusangano Family on Facebook

Rusangano Family are a rap trio from Limerick, Ireland.

== Career ==
Rusangano Family were formed in Limerick in 2014. The band name derives from a Shona word meaning "togetherness", "organization" or "family."

Their members are:

- God Knows (MC) — Munyaradzi GodKnows Jonas, a native of Zimbabwe
- MuRli (poet and wordsmith) — Murli Boevi, a native of Togo
- MynameisjOhn (producer, DJ) — John Lillis, a native of Ennis

Their first album Let The Dead Bury The Dead, won the Choice Music Prize in 2016. Entertainment.ie named it among the top 10 Irish albums of the decade for the 2010s.

== Discography ==
=== Albums ===
- Let the Dead Bury the Dead (2016)
