= Kojaque =

Irish rapper (born 1995)

- Also known as: Kazoo Kid, Jackie Dandelion
- Born: Kevin Smith; 11 January 1995 (age 31); Dublin, Ireland
- Origin: Cabra, Dublin
- Genres: Hip hop; jazz rap
- Occupations: Rapper; record producer
- Years active: 2015–present
- Label: Soft Boy Records
- Website: kojaque.com

Kevin Smith (born 1995), known professionally as Kojaque /ˈkoʊdʒæk/, is an Irish rapper and record producer from Cabra, Dublin. He is also a visual artist and filmmaker.

== Early life ==
Smith grew up in Cabra, Dublin. His parents were originally from County Cavan. His father died when he was a child. He has three brothers, all of whom are also musicians. He attended St Declan's College. He studied fine art in Dublin Institute of Technology and in 2017 received the RHA Student Graduate Award.

== Career ==
Kojaque released his first single, Midnight Flower, in 2015. The music video for the song received media attention, as it featured the artist holding his breath underwater for three minutes while rapping the track. The mixtape attached to the single, Sunday Roast, was released in 2016.

Kojaque released Deli Daydreams, a concept album about the life of a deli worker, in 2018. It was nominated for the Choice Music Prize.

In 2021, Kojaque released Town's Dead. The album deals with themes of heartbreak, his late father's death, gentrification and the Irish housing crisis - with the events of a love triangle that culminates on New Year's Eve woven throughout. For the week ending 2 July 2021, it was the best-selling album on vinyl in Ireland. It was nominated for the Choice Music Prize.

On 27 October 2023, Kojaque released the album Phantom of the Afters. Collaborations include Biig Piig, Wiki, Charlotte Dos Santos and Gotts Street Park. The album traces blurred outlines of childhood trauma, depression, grief and love, interweaving the physical and emotional journey of central character Jackie Dandelion with bigger questions about immigrant identity, homesickness, cultural stereotypes and ultimately the reconciliation of self. It became his third album to be nominated for the Choice Music Prize.

== Discography ==
Albums

- Town's Dead (2021)
- Phantom of the Afters (2023)

EPs

- Deli Daydreams (2018)
- Green Diesel with Luka Palm (2019)
