= Bell X1 discography =

- Studio albums: 9
- Extended plays: 1
- Compilation albums: 1
- Singles: 15

This is the discography of Bell X1.

== Studio albums ==
Title	Album details	Peak chart positions
Title	Album details	IRL
Neither Am I	Released: 13 October 2000; Label: Universal; Formats: CD, Download	30
Music in Mouth	Released: June 2003; Label: Universal; Formats: CD, download	15
Flock	Released: 14 October 2005; Label: Island; Formats: CD, download	1
Blue Lights on the Runway	Released: 20 February 2009; Label: Belly Up; Formats: CD, download	1
Bloodless Coup	Released: 2011; Label: Warner; Formats: CD, download	3
Chop Chop	Released: 28 June 2013; Label: BellyUp; Formats: CD, download	1
Arms	Released: 14 October 2016; Label: BellyUp; Formats: CD, download	2
Merciful Hour	Released: 26 May 2023; Label: BellyUp; Formats: CD, download	54
Good Bones	Released: 13 November 2026; Label: BellyUp; Formats: CD, download	5

== Extended plays ==
- "The Perfect Height For Kicking" (EP). This four-track EP was released prior to the Irish release of Neither Am I, despite sharing its title with a lyric from the song "Rocky Took a Lover", found on their third album.
- A promo EP, also titled "The Perfect Height For Kicking" was released during the promotional campaign for the Flock album. This EP has a different track list, and features songs from the Flock album.

== Singles ==
- "Pinball Machine" (Irish-only release)
- "Man on Mir" (Irish-only release) (IRL #30)
- "White Water Song" (UK #132) Hot Press Single of the Fortnight
- "Tongue" (UK #85)
- "Snakes and Snakes" (UK #99)
- "Alphabet Soup" (Aborted after the promo release)
- "Eve, the Apple of My Eye" (IRL #18, UK #65)
- "Next to You" (Radio-only release)
- "Bigger Than Me" (Irish-only release) (IRL #16)
- "Flame" (13 March 2006) (IRL #12, UK #65)
- "Bladhm" (Irish language version) (Irish-only release)
- "Rocky Took a Lover" (28 August 2006) (IRL #18)
- "The Great Defector" (30 January 2009) (IRL #3, US AAA #9)
- "The Ribs of a Broken Umbrella" (2009)
- "Velcro" (2011) (IRL #44)
- "The End is Nigh" (2013)

== Other releases ==
- The band performed a medley cover version of Justin Timberlake's "Like I Love You" and Kylie Minogue's "Slow" on the charity album Even Better than the Real Thing Vol. 2
- They contributed to the 2009 charity album, Sparks n' Mind, released in aid of Aware, performing a cover version of the Bruce Springsteen song, "No Retreat, No Surrender".
