= Tour De Flock =

Live album by Bell X1
- Released: 15 June 2007
- Recorded: 2006
- Genre: Rock
- Length: 71:34
- Label: BellyUp

Bell X1 chronology
Flock (2005)	Tour De Flock (2007)	Blue Lights on the Runway (2009)

Tour De Flock is the first live album and DVD by Bell X1. It is a 2-disc compilation featuring 16 tracks from their sold-out gig at The Point Theatre, Dublin on 1 December 2006.

The album is the group's first since being leaving Island Records and was issued through their own BellyUp label. The deluxe double package comes with a wallpaper style digipack sleeve. The release was timed to coincide with their summer shows at Malahide Castle in Dublin and at the Marquee in Cork in 2007.

== Track listing ==
- The live DVD contains the following 16 songs from the show.
1. "My First Born for a Song'
2. "Bigger Than Me"
3. "Whitewater Song"
4. "Next to You"
5. "Eve, the Apple of My Eye"
6. "Trampoline"
7. "Rocky Took a Lover"
8. "Alphabet Soup"
9. "Bad Skin Day"
10. "He Said She Said"
11. "Tongue"
12. "Flame"
13. "I'll See Your Heart and I'll Raise You Mine"
14. "Snakes and Snakes"
15. "Blue Rinse Baby"
16. "Lamposts"

The CD only has 13 tracks, omitting "Bigger Than Me", "Next To You" and "Alphabet Soup".

The songs "Godsong" and "Reacharound" are missing from the listing, despite having been played at the show.

== DVD extras ==
- Extras on the DVD include:
  - A version of The Cake Sale's "Some Surprise" filmed live in Cork.
  - Tour De Flock - a short film by Ian Thuillier. featuring "show-day shenanigans" in Waterford, Galway, Killarney, Cork and Dublin.
- The Making Of Flock - a short film by Paul Noonan
- A Photogallery by Annika Johansson.

== Related links ==
- Official website
