= Weatherman (song) =

Single by Juniper
- B-side: "Little Sister", "Rage"
- Released: 30 January 1998
- Genre: Indie rock
- Label: Mercury Records
- Songwriters: Damien Rice, Paul Noonan, Brian Crosby, Dominic Philips, David Geraghty

Juniper singles chronology
| "Weatherman" (1998) | "World Is Dead" (1998) |

"Weatherman" is the debut single by the Irish band Juniper, the precursor to Bell X1 and Damien Rice. It was released on 30 January 1998 and spent seven weeks in the Irish Singles Chart after entering on 5 February, breaking into the Top 10 and achieving a peak of ninth position.

"Weatherman" was released on the Mercury Records label. It featured two B-sides, "Little Sister" and "Rage", the latter of which was recorded at Sulan Studios in Ballyvourney, County Cork and the former of which was recorded at Windmill Lane Studios in Dublin along with "Weatherman". It also featured as the sixth track in a ten-track compilation given away by Hot Press to promote the Heineken Green Energy festival that year.

PolyGram signed a six-album deal with the band around this time.

== Track listing ==
- CDS 469344/2
1. "Weatherman" - (3:51)
2. "Little Sister" - (3:25)
3. "Rage" - (3:18)

== Chart performance ==
| Chart (1998) | Peak position |
|---|---|
| Irish Singles Chart | 9 |
