= The Cake Sale (album) =

2006 studio album by the Cake Sale

Studio album by The Cake Sale
- Released: 10 November 2006
- Recorded: 2006
- Studios: Westland Studios, Dublin
- Length: 35:00
- Labels: Oxfam Ireland; Yep Roc

Professional ratings
Review scores
Source	Rating
New Noise	(favorable)
Pitchfork	4.8/10
RTÉ	5/5 stars

The Cake Sale is a 2006 charity album involving the collected works of a group of Irish and international musicians calling themselves The Cake Sale. The album features artists such as Snow Patrol's Gary Lightbody, Lisa Hannigan, Damien Rice, Josh Ritter, Glen Hansard, Neil Hannon, members of Bell X1 and Nina Persson of The Cardigans. These were brought together by Brian Crosby, a member of Bell X1 at the time. The album had sold 35,000 copies and raised over €250,000 in Ireland by November 2007. That month it was announced that the album would be released globally to increase donations. It peaked at number 3 in the Irish Albums Chart, having spent eighteen weeks there.

== Album information ==
The album was recorded by a group of Irish and international musicians to raise funds for the charity Oxfam Ireland's Make Trade Fair campaign. Proceeds are added to the charity's “unrestricted fund” to support projects in ten African countries, countries such as Tanzania, Malawi, Uganda and Sudan. Crosby said the album's success “completely exceeded expectations”, with the artists hoping it would go gold to cover their costs. All the publishing royalties raised by the album benefit Oxfam as well, an unusual occurrence for a charity album. Worldwide rights were negotiated and a label, Oxfam Publishing, was established to administer the royalties. Oxfam Ireland had little experience in such dealings and left it to the musicians to negotiate the project. Crosby says the album's success has raised the charity's profile and it was released digitally in the United Kingdom on 10 September in the United States on Yep Roc Records on 16 October 2007.

== Track listing ==
The album contains nine tracks and is thirty-five minutes in length.

No.	Title	Writer(s)	Artist(s)	Length
1.	"Last Leaf"	David Geraghty	Lisa Hannigan	3:07
2.	"Vapour Trail"	Paul Noonan	Josh Ritter	3:32
3.	"Black Winged Bird"	Emm Gryner	Nina Persson	4:07
4.	"Some Surprise"	Paul Noonan	Gary Lightbody/Lisa Hannigan	3:18
5.	"All the Way Down"	Glen Hansard	Gemma Hayes	3:20
6.	"Too Many People"	Ollie Cole	Glen Hansard	3:42
7.	"Good Intentions Rust"	Conor Deasy	Conor Deasy	3:01
8.	"Needles"	Damien Rice	Lisa Hannigan	4:06
9.	"Aliens"	Matt Lunson	Neil Hannon	6:31
Total length:				35:00

== Reaction ==
The national broadcaster RTÉ gave the album a five star rating, describing it as "a commendable effort by a large group of musicians who genuinely want to help" and saying it was deserving of its rating "if not always for the music then definitely for the effort". "Some Surprise" and "Too Many People" were deemed the type of songs most of the artists would be happy to have as singles. However, RTÉ questioned some of the album's weaknesses such as "Vapour Trail" – described as "not Paul Noonan's best song nor is it Josh Ritter's best performance" – and the Conor Deasy–penned "Good Intentions Rust" – dismissed as "just as lightweight as anything The Thrills have produced".

== Live performances ==
Plans for a full live performance of the album proved difficult to negotiate, with so many artists involved and so much difficulty with scheduling. However, Gary Lightbody and Lisa Hannigan performed an exclusive live duet of the song "Some Surprise" at the 2008 Meteor Awards in Dublin.

== Chart performance ==
The Cake Sale spent eighteen weeks in the Irish Albums Chart, peaking at #3.

Chart (2007)	Peak position	Sales	Certification
Irish Albums Chart	3	30,000	2× Platinum
