= World Is Dead =

"World is Dead"

Single by Juniper
- B-side: "You", "Orchard", "Weatherman"; (Bobby Wonder remix)
- Released: June 1998
- Genre: Indie rock
- Label: Mercury Records
- Songwriters: Damien Rice, Paul Noonan, Brian Crosby, Dominic Philips, David Geraghty

Juniper singles chronology
"Weatherman" (1988)	"World is Dead" (1998)

"World is Dead" is the second single by the Irish band Juniper, the precursor to Bell X1 and Damien Rice. It was released in June 1998 and spent two weeks in the Irish Singles Chart after entering on 21 May, breaking into the Top 20 and achieving a peak of nineteenth position. "Weatherman" was released on the Mercury Records label. It featured three B-sides, "You", "Orchard" and the Bobby Wonder remix of the band's debut single "Weatherman".

== Track listing ==
- CDS 567067/2
1. "World is Dead" - (3:38)
2. "You" - (4:36)
3. "Orchard" - (4:33)
4. "Weatherman" (Bobby Wonder remix) - (5:13)

== Chart performance ==
Chart (1998)	Peak position
Irish Singles Chart	19
