= The Cake Sale =

International musical collective

- Origin: Ireland
- Years active: 2006–2008
- Labels: Oxfam Publishing, Yep Roc (US)
- Past members: Brian Crosby; David Geraghty; Emm Gryner; Paul Noonan; Glen Hansard; Ollie Cole; Damien Rice; Colm Mac Con Iomaire; Conor Deasy; Matt Lunson; Lisa Hannigan; Nina Persson; Gary Lightbody; Gemma Hayes; Rob Bochnik; Josh Ritter; Neil Hannon; Graham Hopkins; Nick Seymour
- Website: thecakesale.com

The Cake Sale was a collective of mostly Irish musical artists, with Swedish singer-songwriter Nina Persson of the Cardigans and Australian musician Nick Seymour of Crowded House.

The collective was formed in 2006 by Brian Crosby, formerly of Bell X1. The group released a self-titled album that year, with sales proceeds going to Oxfam Ireland's Make Trade Fair campaign. The record's success in Ireland led to an international release the following year, coming out on 10 September 2007 in the UK and on 16 October 2007 in the US, where it was published by Yep Roc Records.

== Album details ==
The Cake Sale was recorded by a group of Irish and international musicians organised by Brian Crosby to raise funds for the charity Oxfam Ireland's Make Trade Fair campaign. Proceeds from the album's sales were added to the charity's "unrestricted fund" to support projects in ten African countries, including Tanzania, Malawi, Uganda, and Sudan. Crosby has said that the album's success "completely exceeded expectations", with the artists initially hoping it would go Gold just to cover their costs. Worldwide rights were negotiated and a label, Oxfam Publishing, was established to administer the royalties. Oxfam Ireland had little experience in such dealings and left it to the musicians to negotiate the project. High sales of the record at home led to it being released digitally in the UK on 10 September and in the US, on Yep Roc Records, on 16 October 2007.

=== "Some Surprise" ===
The song "Some Surprise", a duet between singer-songwriter Lisa Hannigan and Snow Patrol frontman Gary Lightbody, written by Bell X1 frontman Paul Noonan, was featured on an episode of the US medical drama television series Grey's Anatomy, after which it was made available to download on iTunes. The song was also performed live by the duo for the first and only time at the 2008 Meteor Awards.

== Contributors ==
Contributing artists in the collective have included:

- David Geraghty – Bell X1
- Emm Gryner
- Paul Noonan – Bell X1
- Glen Hansard – The Frames, The Swell Season
- Ollie Cole – Turn
- Damien Rice
- Colm Mac Con Iomaire – The Frames
- Conor Deasy – The Thrills
- Matt Lunson
- Lisa Hannigan
- Nina Persson – The Cardigans, A Camp
- Gary Lightbody – Snow Patrol
- Gemma Hayes
- Rob Bochnik – The Frames
- Josh Ritter
- Neil Hannon – The Divine Comedy
- Graham Hopkins – Therapy?, The Frames
- Nick Seymour – Crowded House
