= Eve, the Apple of My Eye =

Single by Bell X1

from the album Music in Mouth
- B-side: "Ten Paces", "Like I Love You"
- Released: 11 June 2004
- Recorded: 2003
- Genre: Indie rock
- Length: 4:05 ("Flock" album version); 5:25 (original version by Damien Rice; called "Never"); 5:37 (Music in Mouth album version)
- Label: Island
- Songwriters: Brian Crosby; David Geraghty; Paul Noonan; Dominic Phillips

Bell X1 singles chronology
| "Snakes and Snakes" (2003) | "Eve, the Apple of My Eye" (2004) | "Bigger Than Me" (2005) |

"Eve, the Apple of My Eye" is a single by the Irish indie rock band, Bell X1, taken from the band's second album Music in Mouth.

It was eventually released on 11 June 2004 in Ireland and 14 June 2004 in the UK, having been originally scheduled for release on 28 May in Ireland and 7 June in the UK. It entered the Irish Singles Chart on 17 June 2004, spending two weeks there and peaking at number 18. The single included a cover of the Justin Timberlake song "Like I Love You".

Outside Ireland it is best known in the United States where it featured as background music in a scene from one of their television shows, The O.C.

== Original ==
"Eve" was originally written and performed when Bell X1 were Juniper (featuring Damien Rice). Called "Never", it was released on the Neither Am I album, before being rewritten and retitled "Eve, the Apple of My Eye" for their second album, Music In Mouth. As "Never" it was performed at a 2FM session and released on a four-tracker as the third track on a record that included "Expensive Silence", "Then Go" and "Deliverance".

== Use in television ==
The song was famously used in a scene of United States teen drama television series The O.C in which two of the female characters, played by Mischa Barton and Olivia Wilde, shared a lesbian kiss.

Paul Noonan later commented that they initially "thought someone was taking the piss" after receiving an e-mail from the show through their Hotmail account to seek permission.

This incident gave the band a wider appeal. They embarked on their debut US tour in 2003 as a consequence. "Eve, the Apple of My Eye" subsequently went on to feature on the music compilation, Music from the OC: Mix 4. However the band were also on the receiving end of some "rather ridiculous" hate email from some angry American Christians. Noonan said:

"We actually got irate emails from some Christian folks linking us with that behaviour."

In 2008, a Bell X1 gig on their US tour was attended by members of the cast. Noonan said:

"A couple of them came to see us play the Viper Room in LA... and we didn't know who they were."

With increased record sales, David Geraghty later said to Ed Power of the Irish Independent: "The OC thing was a huge deal and we have no regrets about doing it. It opened doors for us abroad".

As a result of The O.C. being broadcast in hundreds of countries Bell X1 were reported to have earned much money from the royalties.

== Live performance ==
George Whyte in his Irish Independent review of the December 2006 concert at the Point Theatre—"A fair whack of the punters finally got what they wanted as the familiar piano strains of "Eve, The Apple Of My Eye" rang out, summoning screams of 'Oh my GOD, I LOVE this song!' from Abercrombie-clad teens everywhere".

A live performance of the song witnessed by the Irish Independent in 2009 was "delivered so movingly it's likely to raise goose-pimples".

== Legacy ==
Sunday Tribune journalists Neil Dunphy and Una Mullally named it number 46 in their 2008 "ultimate playlist representing the top-50 Irish songs of all time", reminding readers that it was "chiefly known in the States as the soundtrack to that lesbian kiss in The OC".

== Track listings ==
- CDS CID 856
1. "Eve, the Apple of My Eye" – 4:05
2. "Ten Paces"
3. "Like I Love You" – 4:06
4. "Eve, the Apple of My Eye" (video)
- CDS (Promo) CIDDJ856
1. "Eve, the Apple of My Eye" – 4:05
2. "Eve, the Apple of My Eye" (radio edit) – 3:35
- 7" apple green vinyl IS856/9866800
1. "Eve, the Apple of My Eye" – 4:04
2. "Like I Love You" – 4:06

== Chart performance ==
| Chart (2004) | Peak position |
|---|---|
| Irish Singles Chart | 18 |
| UK Singles (Official Charts) | 65 |
