= Paul Noonan =

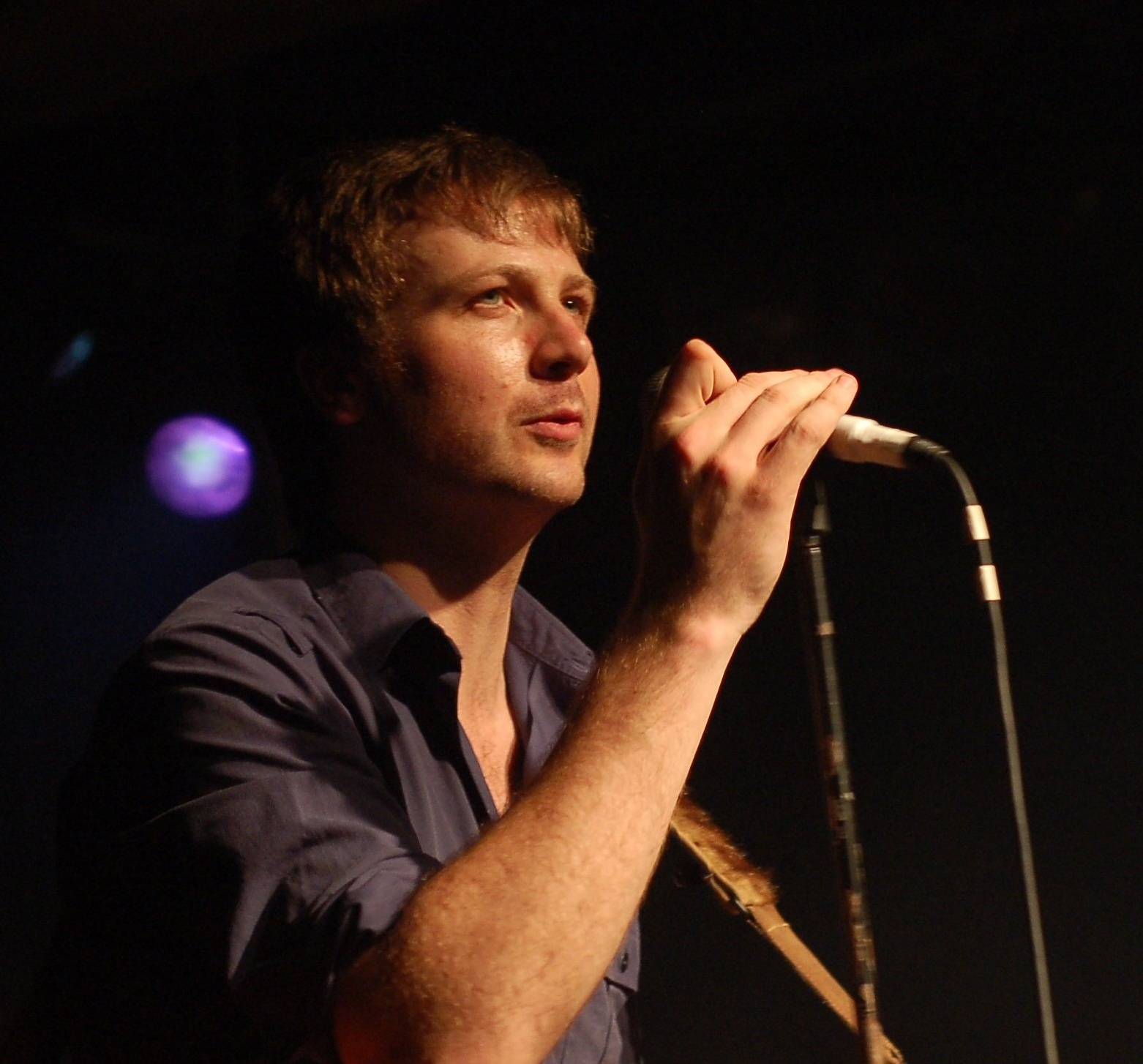
- Paul Noonan performing with Bell X1 at Scala, London

Background information
- Born: Paul Anthony Noonan; 1974 (age 51–52); Lucan, County Dublin, Ireland
- Genres: Rock, folk, acoustic, pop, alternative, electro, new wave
- Occupation: Musician
- Instruments: Guitar, vocals, drums, piano
- Years active: 1991–present
- Labels: BellyUp Records, Bone China Records

Paul Anthony Noonan is a songwriter, vocalist and multi-instrumentalist from Lucan, Dublin. He is most known as the frontman of the Irish group Bell X1 and as a solo artist and collaborator on various musical projects.

== Early years ==
Born in 1974, Noonan grew up in Lucan, near the Dublin-Kildare border. At age nine, while attending St Mary's national school in Lucan, he was second flautist in the Lucan Concert Band, performing covers of works by composers such as John Barry. A visit by a drummer to rehearsal one day caused him to become fascinated by the instrument. He sold his flute and bought a drumkit with his parents' assistance.

Noonan was brought up in a musical household, with his school principal father regularly picking out music to play for his students. His parents had a large collection of vinyl 45s which he would decorate his room with. During his early teenage years, he began writing songs and recording them on tapes. One of the most formative influences during that time was the record collection of a friend's older brother. Noonan drew much inspiration from albums by Supertramp and Talking Heads as well as early concert-going experiences involving acts such as Hothouse Flowers and U2.

While attending Salesian College secondary school in Celbridge, Co Kildare, Noonan met Damien Rice, Dominic Phillips and Brian Crosby. The four would first be members of a folk group that entailed Noonan using school lockers as percussion. In 1991, they would form Juniper, comprising Noonan on drums, Rice on vocals, and Crosby and Phillips on guitars and bass, respectively. Friend and multi-instrumentalist David Geraghty came in to complete the line-up. In 1995, Noonan graduated from Trinity College with a BAI in Computer engineering.

== Music ==
=== Juniper ===
Along with Rice and Geraghty, Noonan was one of the core songwriters in Juniper and contributed to backing vocals as well. In 1997, the band signed a six-album deal with PolyGram. Their only two singles – "Weatherman" and "World Is Dead" – charted in Ireland when released in 1998. That same year, Rice quit the band just as they were about to begin recording their debut album.

With a body of songs already accumulated, Noonan, Geraghty, Phillips and Crosby decided to continue under the name Bell X1, with Noonan taking over lead vocal duties and Paul "Binzer" Brennan coming in on drums. Rice, meanwhile, moved to Tuscany, Italy to write songs for what would eventually be a successful solo career.

=== Bell X1 ===
Releasing seven studio albums, three of which topped charts and two live compilations over a twenty-year career, Bell X1 is regarded as one of the most successful Irish rock acts of all time and national treasures in their native Ireland. The group is also credited with releasing some of the most enduring rock singles on the Irish airwaves, such as "The Great Defector", "Rocky Took a Lover", "Flame", "Eve, the Apple of My Eye" and "Alphabet Soup".

His role as principal songwriter in the band has seen his lyrical style come up as a talking point occasionally, especially in reference to his use of aphorisms, puns and colloquialisms.

Noonan has stated that while a competent drummer, he feels he is less proficient at the other instruments he is more closely associated with in his work with Bell X1, such as guitar and piano. In recent years, he has fulfilled drumming duties for the band both in the studio and occasionally live as well. The renowned Irish rock drummer Paul "Binzer" Brennan (The Frames, The Waterboys, Concerto For Constantine) has said: "One of my favourite drummers is Paul Noonan, the singer from Bell X1. He doesn’t approach songs from a drummer’s point of view."

=== Guest collaborations and Printer Clips ===
Bell X1 always allowed Noonan and other members to explore extracurricular musical projects, its philosophy being that individuals would return with ideas and perspectives acquired elsewhere. Over the years, Noonan has appeared on a number of side projects and as a guest musician (usually percussion and vocals) for fellow artists such as Cathy Davey and Gemma Hayes (he has lent percussion and backing vocals to three of Hayes' albums as well as various EPs). In 2006, he appeared on the popular charity album The Cake Sale as a performer and writer.

Since 2011, Noonan has conducted a solo project called Printer Clips which has taken the form of collaborations on original material with a range of female artists. In May 2014, a self-titled debut album was released featuring collaborations with Joan As Policewoman, Martha Wainwright, Gemma Hayes, Amy Millan, Julia Stone, Lisa Hannigan, Danielle Harrison, Cathy Davey, Maria Doyle Kennedy and fiddler Caoimhín Ó Raghallaigh. The album's release was delayed until May 2014 due to touring and recording commitments for Bell X1's sixth LP, Chop Chop.

In May 2014, Noonan joined many of the female singers who featured on Printer Clips debut album at the National Concert Hall, Dublin for a special live performance of the project. In August 2014, Noonan confirmed a new Printer Clips tour of Ireland in December 2014 with Noonan touring alongside Gemma Hayes.

In recent years, Noonan has curated various cultural events in Ireland, organising ensemble performances centred around a festival or theme. In 2016, he was commissioned as part of the Ireland 2016 Centenary Programme to stage and produce Starboard Home, a live concert series in Dublin's National Concert Hall and an accompanying album. The multi-media project featured new original material by artists such as James Vincent McMorrow, Cathy Davey, Duke Special, Gemma Hayes, Jape, Colm Mac Con Iomaire, Lisa O'Neill, Declan O'Rourke, John Sheahan (The Dubliners), Paul Cleary (The Blades) and novelist Caitriona Lally. In March 2018, Noonan was asked to co-curate a series entitled Imagining Ireland: 21st Century Song – a pair of shows in the National Concert Hall Dublin, and The Barbican in London, of original music to highlight Ireland's diverse creative landscape. Among the acts confirmed were Lisa Hannigan, Saint Sister, Maria Kelly, Brian Deady, Seamus Fogarty, Loah, poet Stephen James Smith and Mango & Mathman.

In July 2018, electronic artist Daithí released a new track entitled "Take The Wheel" featuring Noonan on lead vocals, with Hot Press describing the song as "hauntingly hopeful".

=== Solo work ===
In July 2017, Noonan announced a string of solo dates around Ireland, promising new material as well as songs from the Bell X1 and Printer Clips catalogues.

In spring 2018, it was revealed that Noonan would be releasing Push Puppet, a debut solo EP under his own name produced by Thomas Bartlett and comprising the tracks "Microfiche", "Moth To Your Flame", "Venetian Blinds" and "The Flood". Noonan has said that the material was largely structured over R&B and Hip-Hop grooves created using a phone app called Funk Box, with less emphasis on semantic lyrical meaning than the sound and rhythm of the words. Noonan has stated his intention to release a debut solo album later in 2019.

== Personal life ==
Noonan lives in Dublin with wife Amy Van Den Broek and their two children. The couple released a charity single in 2014 called "Hole in Her Heart", inspired by their daughter Aislinn whom it was discovered had an atrial septal defect while undergoing treatment for an intestinal infection. Proceeds from the sale of the single went to Crumlin Children's Hospital. The pair performed a duet of the song on The Late Late Show in November 2014.

A portrait of Noonan, his wife, their two children and their dog, taken during lockdown in spring 2020, appeared in the book Twilight Together: Portraits of Ireland at Home by photographer Ruth Medjber.

In 2000, Noonan's then-girlfriend, the broadcaster and Irish indie icon Uaneen Fitzsimons, was killed in a car accident. The song "In Every Sunflower" from Bell X1's second album Music in Mouth, was written in her memory.

== Album discography ==
=== Bell X1 ===
- Neither Am I (2000)
- Music in Mouth (2003)
- Flock (2005)
- Tour De Flock (2007)
- Blue Lights on the Runway (2009)
- Bloodless Coup (2011)
- Field Recordings (2012)
- Chop Chop (2013)
- Arms (2016)

=== Printer Clips ===
- Printer Clips (2014)

=== Various ===
- Night on My Side (2002) by Gemma Hayes – percussion, backing vocals
- Burn The Maps (2004) by The Frames – percussion on "Finally”
- The Cake Sale (2006) by various artists – writing, percussion, vocals
- The Hollow of Morning (2008) by Gemma Hayes – percussion, backing vocals
- Let It Break (2011) by Gemma Hayes – percussion, backing vocals
- Starboard Home (2016) by various artists – writing, production, percussion
