= Some Surprise =

Single by Gary Lightbody and Lisa Hannigan

from the album The Cake Sale
- Recorded: 2006
- Label: Oxfam Ireland

Gary Lightbody and Lisa Hannigan singles chronology
"—"	"Some Surprise"	"—"

"Some Surprise" is a song which features on the charity album The Cake Sale released in 2006 by The Cake Sale. It is a duet between Irish singer Lisa Hannigan and Snow Patrol frontman Gary Lightbody, written by Bell X1 frontman Paul Noonan. The song was performed live by the duo for the first and only time at the 2008 Meteor Awards. In addition the song featured on an episode of the popular prime time U.S. medical drama television series Grey's Anatomy after which it was made available to download on iTunes.

== History ==
"Some Surprise" was written by Paul Noonan of Bell X1 and is performed by Lisa Hannigan and Gary Lightbody. The song was initially intended to be sung solo by Noonan, with Hannigan on backing vocals and harmonies. Noonan's original demo was sent to Lightbody, who had shown interest in getting involved in the project. It is the fourth track on The Cake Sale album, between "Black Winged Bird" – written by Emm Gryner and sung by Nina Persson and "All the Way Down" – written by Glen Hansard and sung by Gemma Hayes.

== Reaction ==
The national broadcaster RTÉ described "Some Surprise", alongside the song "Too Many People", as the type of song "most of the musicians (recording the album) would be happy to have as singles".

== Television appearance ==
"Some Surprise" was featured in "Crash into Me – Part One", an episode of Grey's Anatomy broadcast on ABC Television at 21:00 EST on 22 November 2007. The song was featured during a scene where the protagonist Meredith Grey, played by Ellen Pompeo, attempted to save an ambulance crew who had become injured in a crash, after the show's creators selected it to appear. Alongside this the song was made available as a download on iTunes.

== Live performance ==
"Some Surprise" received its only live performance at the Meteor Music Awards held at the RDS, Dublin on 15 February 2008. Lightbody and Hannigan dueted at the awards ceremony on the night.
