= The Victory Dance =

Studio album by David Geraghty
- Released: 28 August 2009 (Republic of Ireland)
- Recorded: 2008–2009
- Studio: West Cork, Ireland
- Genre: Alternative rock
- Label: Decal Records
- Producer: David Geraghty, Tim Martin, Greg French

David Geraghty chronology
Kill Your Darlings (2007)	The Victory Dance (2009)

Professional ratings
Review scores
Source	Rating
RTÉ Entertainment	(4/5)
Hot Press	(4/5)

The Victory Dance is the second studio album by Irish singer-songwriter David Geraghty (also a member of Bell X1). The album was released in Ireland on 28 August 2009. Following the album's release, Geraghty went on tour throughout the Republic of Ireland. The album features ten tracks. The first single from the album was "Tuesday's Feet." The second single from the album is "The Emperor's Hand–Me-Downs," released in Ireland on 30 October 2009.

The album debuted in the Irish Albums Chart at #47.

== Track listing ==
1. "Watch Her Win"
2. "Tuesday's Feet"
3. "Instant Sunshine"
4. "Soft Spot"
5. "Wear Out Your Name"
6. "Last Time Around"
7. "The Emperors Hand–Me-Downs"
8. "Stones"
9. "Change My Mind"
10. "Falter"
