= Man on Mir =

2000 single by Bell X1

"Man On Mir"

Single by Bell X1

from the album Neither Am I
- Released: 8 September 2000
- Recorded: 2000
- Genre: Rock
- Label: Island
- Songwriters: Brian Crosby, David Geraghty, Paul Noonan and Dominic Philips

Bell X1 singles chronology
"Pinball Machine" (2000)	"Man On Mir" (2000)	"White Water Song" (2003)

"Man on Mir" is a single by the Irish pop rock quintet, Bell X1, and the second from the band's debut album Neither Am I. It was released on 8 September 2000 in Ireland. It entered the Irish Singles Chart on 14 September 2000, spending one week there and peaking at #30, being the first Top 30 hit.
