= Turn (Turn album) =

Studio album by Turn
- Released: September 23, 2005
- Recorded: 2004–2005
- Genre: Rock
- Label: Setanta Records
- Producer: Ronan McHugh

Turn chronology
Forward	Turn

Turn is the eponymously titled third full-length offering from the Irish indie trio Turn. Turn offered a more pop/singer songwriter direction for Meath based band. Their first album, Antisocial, had shown a strong Pixies style influence, their second album, Forward, offered an even darker side to the band's sound, but with Turn they showed they were not getting any darker. The album was a mixture of catchy pop tunes such as "It's About Nothing" and "Stop", and also more Elliott Smith inspired tunes, such as "Close Your Eyes" and "Wildside".

Opinions were very mixed about the album among fans and critics. Some called it a mile stone in musical growth for the band, others claimed it was a last-ditch effort by the band to become more commercial and popular on the Irish airwaves. However, the strength of the songs proved themselves and became live favourites instantly on the tours that followed.

== Track listing ==
1. It's about Nothing
2. Stop
3. No Ones Gonna Change Your Life But You
4. It's A Waste of My Time
5. Close Your Eyes
6. Sorry's Just A Word
7. So Lame
8. Too Beat
9. All These Days
10. Wildside
11. Little Bird
12. I Don't Wanna Waste More Time

All tracks written by Ollie Cole

== Personnel ==
- Ollie Cole - Lead Vocals, Guitars, Piano
- Ian Melady - Drums, Backing Vocals
- Ciran Kavanagh - Bass, Backing Vocals
