= Heineken Green Energy =

Irish music festival

- Heineken Green Energy 2008 logo
- Genre: Rock
- Dates: May bank holiday weekend
- Locations: Dublin Castle, Ireland
- Years active: 1996–2008
- Website: www.heinekenmusic.ie

Heineken Green Energy was an Irish music festival that took place at Dublin Castle over the May bank holiday weekend. It attracted over 50,000 people per year for what was the opening of the music festival season in Ireland. The event, sponsored by Heineken International first took place in 1996 and occurred on an annual basis until 2008. While the main event occurred in Dublin Castle, smaller shows were held in other city venues.

== History ==
=== 1996 festival ===
Heineken Green Energy took place for the 1st time in 1996 at the Point Theatre, featuring Orbital & Lou Reed

=== 1997 festival ===
Heineken Green Energy took place for the 2nd year in 1997 in Dublin Castle.

=== 1998 festival ===
Heineken Green Energy took place for the 3rd year in 1998, featuring Texas and Finlay Quaye. A ten-track compilation CD, featuring artists such as Texas, The Divine Comedy, Catatonia, Juniper, Aslan and Suede, was given away by Hot Press to promote the festival.

=== 1999 festival ===
Heineken Green Energy took place for the 4th year in 1999, featuring Catatonia, The Cardigans and Gay Dad.

=== 2000 festival ===
Heineken Green Energy took place for the 5th year in 2000, featuring Van Morrison.

=== 2001 festival ===
Heineken Green Energy took place for the 6th year in 2001, featuring Buena Vista Social Club and JJ72.

=== 2002 festival ===
Heineken Green Energy took place for the 7th year in 2002, featuring The White Stripes, The Hives, Muse, The Frames, Damien Rice, Bell X1, Mundy, The Revs.

=== 2003 festival ===
Heineken Green Energy took place for the 8th year in 2003. It was held in Dublin over the May Bank Holiday weekend. 2003's venues included Dublin Castle, the Ambassador, Temple Bar Music Centre, The Village and Whelan's as well as 20 other key music venues in Dublin City. Over the weekend approximately 40,000 people attended in excess of 17 live gigs. Musicians to play the 2003 festival included Groove Armada, Moloko, Gus Gus, Craig David, Stereophonics and Beck.

=== 2004 festival ===
Heineken Green Energy took place for the 9th year in 2004, featuring The Streets, The Stooges and Amy Winehouse .

=== 2005 festival ===
Heineken Green Energy took place for the 10th year in 2005, featuring Beck and Paddy Casey.

=== 2006 festival ===
The 11th Heineken Green Energy Festival at Dublin Castle was headlined by Snow Patrol who played on 29 April. Richard Hawley also played that day. The 2006 event also saw Ian Brown and Republic of Loose on 30 April whilst Kaiser Chiefs and Graham Coxon finished off the festival on 1 May. With many other acts playing around the city during the weekend as part of the "gig trail/fringe" (i.e. the other music venues around the city), Dublin once again became an international music centre for the duration of the festival.

=== 2007 festival ===
Heineken Green Energy Festival took place for the 12th year in May 2007. Kasabian headlined the Heineken Green Energy festival on the Saturday of the May bank holiday weekend (5 May). They were supported by The Blizzards and Future Kings of Spain. Sinéad O'Connor headlined the Heineken Green Energy festival on the Sunday of the May bank holiday weekend (6 May). She was supported by Kíla and Delorentos.

=== 2008 festival ===
Heineken Green Energy Festival took place for the 13th year in May 2008. Nick Cave and the Bad Seeds headlined the Dublin Castle event on 3 May, Radio Soulwax headlined on Sunday 4 May and The Kooks headlined on Monday 5 May. On Tuesday 5 February at 09:00, tickets for The Kooks and Radio Soulwax performances went on sale. Tickets for Nick Cave and the Bad Seeds sold out quickly.

The last festival took place from 3–5 May 2008, featuring Nick Cave and the Bad Seeds, Radio Soulwax and The Kooks. It has previously hosted Lou Reed, Van Morrison, Bryan Ferry, Morrissey, Iggy Pop, Alice Cooper, Orbital, The Streets, Beck, Mercury Rev, Stereophonics, Supergrass, Buena Vista Social Club, Manic Street Preachers, The White Stripes, Kasabian and Ian Brown. Irish acts to have featured include The Frames, The Cranberries, Snow Patrol, Damien Rice, Bell X1, JJ72, Paddy Casey, Republic of Loose, Kíla, Sinéad O'Connor, Ash, Future Kings of Spain, The Blizzards, Delorentos and The Coronas.
