= Bigger Than Me (Bell X1 song) =

Single by Bell X1

from the album Flock
- B-side: "Still Selling Shoes"
- Released: 30 September 2005
- Recorded: 2005
- Genre: Indie rock
- Length: 3:50
- Label: Island
- Songwriters: Brian Crosby, David Geraghty, Paul Noonan, Dominic Phillips

Bell X1 singles chronology
"Eve, the Apple of My Eye" (2004)	"Bigger Than Me" (2005)	"Flame" (2006)

"Bigger Than Me" is a single by the Irish indie rock quintet, Bell X1, and the first to be taken from the band's third album Flock. It was released on 30 September 2005 in Ireland and 10 October 2005 in the UK. It entered the Irish Singles Chart on 6 October 2005, spending two weeks there and peaking at #16.

== Track listings ==
- CDS 987389-0/LC00407
1. "Bigger Than Me" – 3:50
2. "Still Selling Shoes" – 3:23
3. "My First Born For a Song" (video)

== Chart performance ==
Chart (2005)	Peak position
Irish Singles Chart	16
