= Salesian College Celbridge =

- An Coláiste Sailéaiseach, Cill Droichid

Location
- Moortown, Celbridge, County Kildare; Ireland; 53.358°N 6.552°W

Information
- Motto: We care, develop, believe – together we achieve
- Religious affiliation: Salesians of Don Bosco
- Established: August 1981
- Principal: Brenda Kearns
- Staff: 60 teachers
- Gender: Male
- Enrollment: 776 (2023)
- Campus size: 8 ha (20 ac)
- Campus type: Rural
- Website: salesianscelbridge.com

Salesian College Celbridge is a secondary school for male students aged 12–19 around the town of Celbridge in County Kildare, Ireland. As of 2023, the school reportedly had over 700 students and 50 staff.

== History ==
The Salesian College, Celbridge was originally formed in 1981 in a disused primary school on the Hazelhatch Road, which is now the Church of Ireland Primary School. Tony McEvoy was the first principal with four staff members and fifty-five students. In the summer of 1984, the school moved to a newly built premises, where it remains today. The new school and sports grounds are situated on fifteen acres, and there have been a number of developments and extensions since then.

The school is no longer run by priests of the Salesian order. The principal is Brenda Kearns, who took up the position in August 2009 succeeding Dan Carroll.

== Subjects ==
Salesians offers Junior Certificate, Transition Year, and Leaving Certificate courses, as well as a unit for autistic youths. The school's classes have been mixed since 2004.

In the Leaving Certificate cycle, courses in biology, chemistry, and physics are offered. The Junior-cycle subject broadly defined as "Business Studies" is devolved into separate courses accounting, business and economics. Students may also pursue courses in art, construction, technical drawing or engineering. The Leaving Certificate Vocational Programme, which aims to provide a more vocation-oriented education can also be taken by students of the college. The school also has IT facilities.

== Sport ==
Sports played at Salesians include soccer, athletics, hurling, rugby, badminton and Gaelic football. An annual road race, held each October, is a 4.2 km (2.6 mi) road race participated in by around 450 students. The Fr. Archer Cup, named after Charles Archer, a former teacher, is awarded to the winner.

Salesians won the U14 All-Ireland Soccer Final in 2006. The Salesians' senior soccer team reached the Senior Soccer All-Ireland final in 2010, losing to St. Marys, Galway, in the last minute of extra time. The Salesian Senior football team reached the All-Ireland "B" semi finally in 2010, losing to Éire Óg in Carlow by 2 points. The U16 football team reached the Leinster "B" Final against Moath CBS, where they lost by 2 goals the same year.

== Notable past pupils ==
- Damien Rice, singer and former member of the band Juniper.
- All four members of indie rock band Bell X1
- Members of "Juliets Rescue", formerly Box Social
- Devon Murray, actor
- Karl Bermingham, striker for Derry City FC
- Mark Kenneally, Olympic marathon runner
- Daniel O'Reilly, footballer
