= Bloodless Coup =

Studio album by Bell X1
- Released: 1 April 2011
- Recorded: 2009–2010, Ireland
- Genre: Rock
- Length: 48:30
- Language: English
- Label: BellyUp Records
- Producer: Rob Kirwan

Bell X1 chronology
| Blue Lights on the Runway (2009) | Bloodless Coup (2011) | Chop Chop (2013) |

Singles from Bloodless Coup
- 1. "Velcro" Released: 1 March 2011; 2. "Four Minute Mile"

Bloodless Coup is the fifth studio album by Irish band Bell X1. It was released on 1 April 2011 in Ireland, Germany, Belgium and the Netherlands, on 4 April in the United Kingdom, and on 5 April in North America.

It has received average reviews from critics and reached number 3 of the Top Irish 100 Albums in its debut week.

== Production ==
The album was produced by Rob Kirwan and recorded in Westmeath, Ireland and while touring Europe and North America. Prior to the release of the album Bell X1 performed tracks from Bloodless Coup on a short acoustic European tour. This tour included live dates in autumn/winter 2010 in Ireland, France, UK, Netherlands and Germany. In September 2010, the band revealed details about their fifth studio album. On 11 September the band offered fans their first listen to a new track called "Velcro" which was recorded at Oxegen Festival in Ireland. The band followed this with further live dates in North America and Europe. On 6 January 2011, Bell X1 revealed the artwork for the album. On 18 January the band revealed another track from the album called "Hey Anna Lena", followed by a video on 26 January of the band recording this song. The track-listing for the album was revealed on their website on 3 February 2011.

== Singles ==
The first single from the album, "Velcro", received its first radio airplay on Today FM on 17 February 2011. It was released through iTunes on 1 March 2011. A physical release of "Velcro" was released in Ireland, Belgium and the Netherlands on 4 March with a North American release on 15 March. The promo video was released on 15 March.

== Promo ==
- Promotion for the album began early in summer 2010 with live performances at festivals such as Oxegen and a number of tour dates in Europe and North America. The band performed an acoustic set for Today FM in November 2010 providing fans with some new material.
- U.S. National Public Radio recorded a special broadcast of the band performing at the Guinness Storehouse in Dublin on 3 April 2011, flying 85 Americans over for what was described by Hot Press as "unprecedented" and "an international first". The album's lead single "Velcro" was playlisted by at least 15 different American radio stations, as well as others in Europe such as Kink FM, Motor FM and Radio Eins.
- The album was streamed one week prior to its release on the official Bell X1 website, Myspace page and SoundCloud.

== Tour 2011 ==
Following touring in 2010, Bell X1 followed this with an announcement that they would headline at Live at The Marquee in Cork City. The official 2011 tour kicks off on 6 April 2011 in Dublin. The tour will see the band perform throughout the Republic of Ireland, the United Kingdom, the Netherlands, France, Belgium, Germany, Canada and the United States. The first leg of the tour will finish in Galway, Ireland on 16 July 2011.

== Critical reception ==
Professional ratings
Review scores
| Source | Rating |
|---|---|
| Metacritic | (58/100) |
| Allmusic | 3/5 stars |
| CHARTattack | 3/5 stars |
| NOW | 3/5 stars |
| Paste | (6.9/10) |

The album has received average reviews, though some critics did praise the album and saw it as their best yet. It currently holds a Metacritic score of 58/100. State described the album as "rejuvenated" and Gold Plectrum describing the album as "...a real return to form from Bell X1 and leaves us with future hope of similar releases". RTÉ gave the album 3/5 and claimed that the album "could be their strongest bet yet".

Andrew Leahey writing for Allmusic gave the album three stars, noting the band's shift towards electronica in a similar fashion to fellow Irish act U2 with Pop, adding that Bell X1 "sidestep" the problems they encountered, "using synthesizers and drum machines to enhance, not dominate, the songs", while noting a decline in quality in the lyricism of Noonan.

== Track listing ==
All tracks are written by David Geraghty, Dominic Phillips and Paul Noonan.

| No. | Title | Length |
|---|---|---|
| 1. | "Hey Anna Lena" | 5:37 |
| 2. | "Velcro" | 4:49 |
| 3. | "Nightwatchmen" | 4:21 |
| 4. | "Sugar High" | 5:57 |
| 5. | "Built to Last" | 5:34 |
| 6. | "4 Minute Mile" | 5:17 |
| 7. | "Safer Than Love" | 4:16 |
| 8. | "The Trailing Skirts of God" | 4:55 |
| 9. | "Haloumi" | 4:14 |
| 10. | "74 Swans" | 3:30 |
| 11. | "Amsterdam Says" (bonus track on some releases) | 6:32 |
