= Victory dance =

Victory dance may refer to:

- Victory dance (sports), an elaborate celebration of a score or a victory
- Seungjeonmu (literally "victory dance"), a Korean court dance
- "The Victory Ball" (a.k.a. "A Victory Dance"), an anti-war poem by Alfred Noyes

In music

- The Victory Dance, an album by Irish singer-songwriter David Geraghty
- "The Victory Dance", a song from the album Theocracy by Christian metal band Theocracy
- "Victory Dance", a song from the album Circuital by American rock band My Morning Jacket
- "Victory Dance", a song from the album Roadhouse by American rock band John Cafferty & The Beaver Brown Band
- "The Dance of Victory", a song from the album Sprit by Swiss band Eluveitie
