= Kill Your Darlings =

Kill Your Darlings may refer to:

- Kill Your Darlings (2006 film), a Swedish film
- Kill Your Darlings (album), a 2007 album by David Geraghty
- Kill Your Darlings (magazine), an Australian literary journal, launched in 2010
- Kill Your Darlings (2013 film), an American film
