= Antisocial =

Antisocial may refer to:

== Arts and entertainment ==
=== Music ===
- Antisocial (album), by Turn, 2000
- "Antisocial" (Trust song), 1980
- "Antisocial" (Ed Sheeran and Travis Scott song), 2019
- "Antisocial", a song by Gucci Mane from the 2000 mixtape Burrrprint 2
- Antisocial, a song by Migos and Juice Wrld from the 2021 album Culture III
- Antisocial Records, formerly Antisocial Entertainment, English record label managed by Silkie

=== Film and television ===
- Antisocial (film), a 2013 Canadian horror film
- Anti-Social (film), a 2015 Hungarian-British crime film
- "Anti-social", a "minisode" from Talking Tom & Friends
- "Anti-Social", an episode of The Loud House

=== Literature ===
- Antisocial: Online Extremists, Techno-Utopians, and the Hijacking of the American Conversation, a 2019 book by Andrew Marantz

== Sociology, psychiatry and psychology ==
- Anti-social behaviour
- Antisocial personality disorder
- Psychopathy
- Conduct disorder

== See also ==
- Asociality, a lack of motivation for social interaction, or preference for solitary activities
- Criticism of socialism
- Deviance (sociology), actions or behaviors that violate social norms
- Misanthropy
- Anti-social Behaviour Act 2003, in the UK
- Anti-social Behaviour, Crime and Policing Act 2014, in the UK
- Anti-social behaviour order, in the UK
- Crime and Disorder Act 1998, in the UK
- Public-order crime
