= The Great Defector =

Single by Bell X1

Single by Bell X1

from the album Blue Lights on the Runway
- Released: 30 January 2009
- Recorded: November 2008
- Genre: Indie rock
- Length: 3:51
- Label: BellyUp
- Songwriters: David Geraghty, Paul Noonan, Dominic Phillips
- Producer: Roger Bechirian

Bell X1 singles chronology
"Rocky Took a Lover" (2006)	"The Great Defector" (2009)	"The Ribs of a Broken Umbrella" (2009)

"The Great Defector" is the lead single from Bell X1's fourth studio album Blue Lights on the Runway.

The single was released in Ireland on 30 January 2009 and internationally on 3 February 2009. It was selected as Tony's Daily Download by Today FM presenter Tony Fenton on 16 January 2009 before its release. Upon its release it reached number three in the Irish Singles Chart. It reached number one in the airplay charts and the band went on to feature on the cover of Hot Press the following month.

It was Bell X1's most successful single at the time of its release.

== Composition and recording ==
Vocalist Paul Noonan has compared the song's style to that of Talking Heads. The song was recorded in November 2008 in Ballycumber House, "a big, draughty, stately home... ...under the beady gaze of musty portraits of the Lords and Ladies of the estate from the 15th century". Jim Farber of the New York Daily News has praised Noonan's "flair for dialogue and his keen way with a metaphor", claiming "his cruel writing will make you swoon". "The Great Defector" was given its debut live performance on 11 July 2008 during Oxegen 2008 .

== Reception ==
The song has been widely praised in the Irish media; amongst its fans are Today FM presenter Tony Fenton and RTÉ's radio presenter and television chat show host Ryan Tubridy, who has described it as his "favourite hit of the year". A US disc jockey said it reminded him of "late period Talking Heads". Irish Independent journalist Eamon Sweeney described it as "an extremely Talking Headish song, but also happens to [be] the best thing on the airwaves at the moment". The song was credited with a renewed surge in demand for tickets to the band's live shows.

== Television performances ==
Following its release, Bell X1 performed "The Great Defector" on Tubridy Tonight on 21 February 2009. They performed the song on the Late Show with David Letterman on 17 March 2009.

== Charts ==
Chart (2009)	Peak position
Ireland (IRMA)	3
US Adult Alternative Airplay (Billboard)	9
