= Printer Clips =

- Origin: Dublin, Ireland
- Genres: Alternative
- Years active: 2011–present
- Labels: Printer Clips
- Members: Paul Noonan
- Website: www.printerclips.com

Printer Clips is the side-project of Bell X 1's lead singer Paul Noonan. The project began in 2011.

== History and development ==
On 20 February 2012, Hot Press reported Noonan would release his first solo effort, featuring collaborations with leading female artists such as Gemma Hayes, Martha Wainwright, Joan Wasser and more to be confirmed in due course.

The yet untitled album was expected to be released in late 2012. The album's release was delayed until May 2014 due to his commitment touring, recording and releasing Chop Chop with Bell X1. The first release from the project was the EP The Left Sleeve on April 25 in Ireland. On 16 May 2014 a second EP The Right Sleeve was released featuring 5 different tracks. The first commercial single release was 'Apparatchik' featuring the vocals of Paul Noonan and Lisa Hannigan.

By 23 May 2014 the self-titled debut album was released featuring 9 different tracks featuring vocals from Joan As Policewoman, Martha Wainwright, Gemma Hayes, Amy Millan, Julia Stone, Lisa Hannigan, Danielle Harrison, Cathy Davey, Maria Doyle Kennedy and Caoimhin O'Raghallaigh.

On 23 May 2014 Noonan joined many of the female singers who featured on Printer Clips debut album at Ireland's National Concert Hall. In August 2014, Noonan confirmed a new Printer Clips tour of Ireland for December 2014, he will tour alongside Gemma Hayes. Both Hayes and Noonan performed 'Snowman' on RTÉ One Television in Ireland on 22 August 2014.

== Discography ==
- The Left Sleeve EP (25 April 2014)
- The Right Sleeve EP (16 May 2014)
- Printer Clips (23 May 2014)

== Singles ==
- Apparatchik (April 2014)
- Snowman (August 2014)
