= Make Trade Fair =

Campaign organized by Oxfam International

The Make Trade Fair logo.

Make Trade Fair was a campaign organized by Oxfam International to promote trade justice and fair trade among governments, institutions, and multinational corporations. As of 2022, the website is defunct. It first appears to have gone offline in early 2004.

== Objectives ==
The campaign has focused on the elimination of several trade practices:

- Dumping, which occurs when highly subsidized, surplus commodities from developed countries such as rice, cotton, corn, and sugar are sold at low prices and farmers from poor countries have difficulty competing. It is believed that this creates an uneven playing field where farmers in developing countries are unable to compete in the market with cheaper foreign produce and crops.
- Tariffs, where nations enforce high taxes on imported goods, restricting the sales of products from other nations.
- Unbalanced labour rights for women, who often perceive that they earn lower wages than their male counterparts.
- Stringent patent issues, that prevent the prices of medication, software, and textbooks (e.g. Gene patents, Chemical patents, and Software patents) from being lowered. Thus, such essential goods are often inaccessible to developing nations.

== Key events ==
=== Make Trade Fair concerts ===
In 2002 and 2004, special benefit concerts were held in London to promote the Make Trade Fair campaign. Proceeds from the shows went to aid Oxfam's promotional campaigns. Produced by Emily Eavis, Marianne Troup, and Lily Sobhani, performers from the 2002 "Fairplay" gig include Chris Martin and Jonny Buckland from Coldplay, Noel Gallagher, and Ms. Dynamite, while the 2004 event included Michael Stipe, Razorlight, and The Thrills.

In 2008, the Make Trade Fair support CD The Cake Sale was produced. The 9 songs were performed by Lisa Hannigan, Nina Persson, Gary Lightbody, Gemma Hayes, Glen Hansard, Josh Ritter, Conor Deasy and Neil Hannon, and written by Deasy, Hansard, Emm Gryner, Paul Noonan, Ollie Cole, Damien Rice and others.

=== WTO Ministerial Conference of 2005 ===
The Make Trade Fair campaign was active at the WTO Ministerial Conference of 2005, held in Hong Kong. Various demonstrations and activities were held, including the handover of some 17.8 million signatures on the Big Noise petition to WTO Director General Pascal Lamy.
