= Kill Your Darlings (album) =

Studio album by David Geraghty
- Released: 7 September 2007 (Republic of Ireland)
- Recorded: 2006–2007
- Genre: Alternative
- Label: Decal Records
- Producer: David Geraghty

David Geraghty chronology
Kill Your Darlings (2007)	The Victory Dance (2009)

Professional ratings
Review scores
Source	Rating
RTÉ Entertainment	(4/5)

Kill Your Darlings is the debut studio album by Irish singer-songwriter David Geraghty (also a member of Bell X1). The album was released in Ireland in September 2007. Following the album's release Geraghty went on a nationwide tour of Ireland. Shortly after its release it received critical acclaim. David Geraghty was nominated for 3 awards in the Irish music industry these included the Meteor Awards - Best Irish Male 2007, Meteor Awards - Best Irish Album 2007 and Choice Music Prize - Best Irish Album.

== Track listing ==
1. "Ragdoll"
2. "Back Seat"
3. "Kaleidoscope"
4. "Long Time Running"
5. "Cracked Skull"
6. "Fear The Hitcher"
7. "It Won't Belong"
8. "El Nino"
9. "Delgadina"
10. "All The King's Horses"
