= Flame (Bell X1 song) =

Single by the Irish pop rock quintet, Bell X1

Single by Bell X1

from the album Flock
- B-side: "Monkey 61"
- Released: 10 March 2006
- Recorded: 2005
- Genre: Indie rock
- Length: 3:32
- Label: Island
- Songwriters: Brian Crosby; David Geraghty; Paul Noonan; Dominic Phillips

Bell X1 singles chronology
"Bigger Than Me" (2005)	"Flame" (2006)	"Rocky Took a Lover" (2006)

"Flame" is a single by the Irish pop rock quintet, Bell X1, and the second to be taken from the band's third album Flock. It was released on 10 March 2006. It entered the Irish Singles Chart on 16 March 2006, spending four weeks there and peaking at #12.

The BBC described it and follow-up single "Rocky Took a Lover" as "two of the finest pieces of music written on this island", though lamented its lack of international success. The song was later included in a collection of works giving a "sense of the noughties" put together by Vincent Murphy and broadcast on Morning Ireland on 31 December 2009.

== Song information ==
"Flame" received extensive airplay on Irish national radio and the musical style used was compared to that of Talking Heads.

== Live performance ==
Bell X1 are known to remind fans of the link between the song's title and their well-known tour bus fire in the United States in March 2008. Vocalist Paul Noonan introduced it to the watching crowd at Oxegen 2008 by quipping: "We played this song so good in the States, so sick, that our tour bus went on fire. The song just caught on, like flames. So watch out folks, this one is incendiary!". The Irish Independent has said that "Flame" "truly come(s) alive in concert". A live performance of this at the RDS was recorded to be released at a later date.

== Track listings ==
- CDS CID919/9877504
1. "Flame" (radio edit) – 3:32
2. "Monkey 61"
3. "Flame" (Chicken Lips mix)
4. "Flame" (video)
5. U-myx software
- 7"
1. "Flame" – 3:32
2. "Monkey 61"
- 12"
1. "Flame" (Chicken Lips mix)
2. "Flame" (Solid Groove mix)
- CDS (Promo) CIDDJ919
1. "Flame" (radio edit) – 3:32
- 12" (UK Promo 12" remix) 12IS919
1. "Flame" (Chicken Lips mix)
2. "Flame" (Chicken Lips Dub Deluxe)

== Chart performance ==
Chart (2006)	Peak position
Irish Singles Chart	12
UK Singles Chart	65

== Bladhm ==
An Irish language version, "Bladhm" was later released for the Irish market only.
