= Box Social =

A box social is a type of social event.

The Box Social may also refer to:

- The Box Social, an American band, often described as pop rock and sometimes as grunge revival
- The Box Social (Portland, Oregon), a bar and restaurant in the United States
