= Rocky Took a Lover =

Single by Bell X1

from the album Flock
- B-side: "Butterflies", "Enjoy the Silence"
- Released: 28 August 2006
- Recorded: 2005
- Genre: Indie rock
- Length: 4:08
- Label: Island
- Songwriters: Brian Crosby; David Geraghty; Paul Noonan; Dominic Phillips

Bell X1 singles chronology
| "Flame" (2006) | "Rocky Took a Lover" (2006) | "The Great Defector" (2009) |

"Rocky Took a Lover"

"Rocky Took a Lover" is a single by the Irish pop rock quintet, Bell X1, and the third to be taken from the band's third album Flock. It was released on 28 August 2006. It entered the Irish Singles Chart on 31 August 2006, spending four weeks there and peaking at number 18. The single included a cover of the Depeche Mode song "Enjoy the Silence".

Many Irish radio stations, including Today FM, had been playing the track since before the release of the previous single "Flame" (as early as December 2005) and the song was used extensively to promote the band's third album. In early 2008, the song featured on a Dublin Bus television advertising campaign.

A special website—www.rockytookalover.com—was created by the band for the release of the song, featuring blogs written by the characters of Rocky and Adrianna. The BBC described it and previous single "Flame" as "two of the finest pieces of music written on this island".

== Live performances ==
The Irish Independent has said that "Rocky Took a Lover" "truly come(s) alive in concert".

The band performed the song when they appeared on the Late Show with David Letterman on 17 March 2008.

== Track listings ==
- CDS 1704233
1. "Rocky Took a Lover" – 4:08
2. "Butterflies" – 5:28
3. "Enjoy the Silence" – 3:36
4. "Rocky Took a Lover" (Joe Steer's Ag-Style Altercation) – 3:14
- 7" 1704234
1. "Rocky Took a Lover" – 4:08
2. "Enjoy the Silence" – 3:36
- CDS (Promo) CIDXDJ937 (released May 2006)
1. "Rocky Took a Lover" (single version) – 4:04

== Chart performance ==
| Chart (2006) | Peak position |
|---|---|
| Irish Singles Chart | 18 |
