= The Box Social (Portland, Oregon) =

Bar and restaurant in the United States

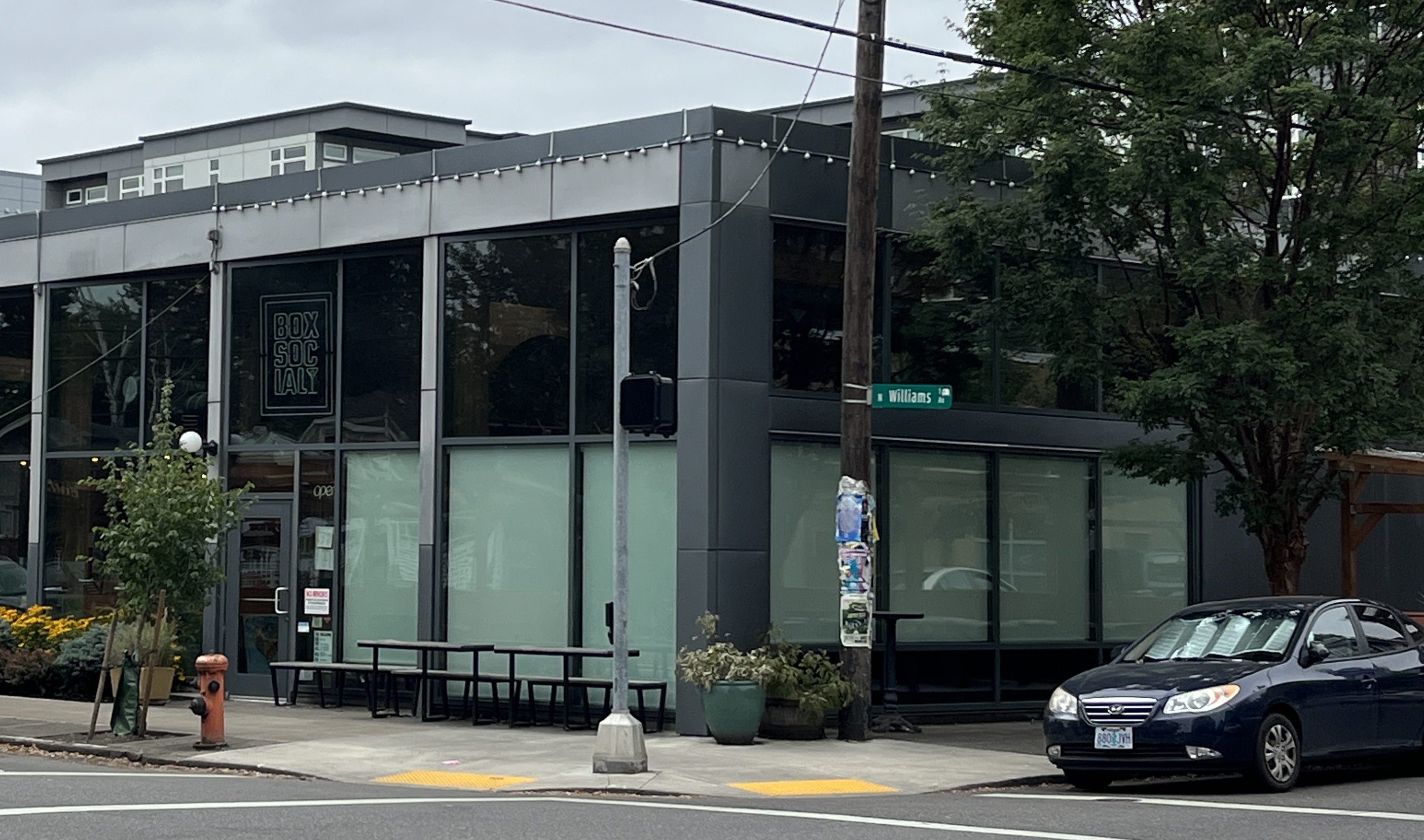
- The bar's exterior in 2022
- Interactive map of The Box Social

Restaurant information
- Established: December 2011
- Owners: Eric and Shannon McQuilkin
- Location: 3971 North Williams Avenue, Portland, Multnomah, Oregon, 97227, United States
- Coordinates: 45.5519°N 122.6670°W
- Website: bxsocial.com

The Box Social is a bar and restaurant in Portland, Oregon, United States. Established in late 2011, the business operates in the north Portland part of the Boise neighborhood.

== Description ==
The 1,000-square-foot bar The Box Social operates from a "boxy glass-and-steel contemporary" building in the north Portland part of the Boise neighborhood. The interior has a dark mahogany bar, a mural painted by artist Maria Joan Dixon, and a stuffed peacock. One guide book by Moon Publications says the atmosphere is "dark and romantic". Eater Portland has described The Box Social as a "sultry" cocktail bar, and "a sumptuous, intimate lounge" with snacks such as bread with pimento cheese spread, parmesan popcorn, and hummus plates. The food menu has also included a fig compote panini, goldfish crackers, and a grilled cheese sandwich with tomato soup.

Among 22 drinks on the menu in 2015 were Brown Derbys and the Ramos Gin Fizz, as well as versions of daiquiris, margaritas, Manhattans, and Negronis. The Cooler has bourbon, Applejack, orange liqueur, lime, and apple drinking vinegar, and the Stone Cold Fox has Goslings Black Seal Rum, habanero-ginger honey, lime, and mango. The Feather and Nail has Fernet, ginger liqueur, and lime juice, and the Thoroughbred has Torani Amer, brandy, maraschino, lemon, and pomegranate shrub. The bar has also served beer, wine, and RuPaul-themed Aperol spritzes.

== History ==
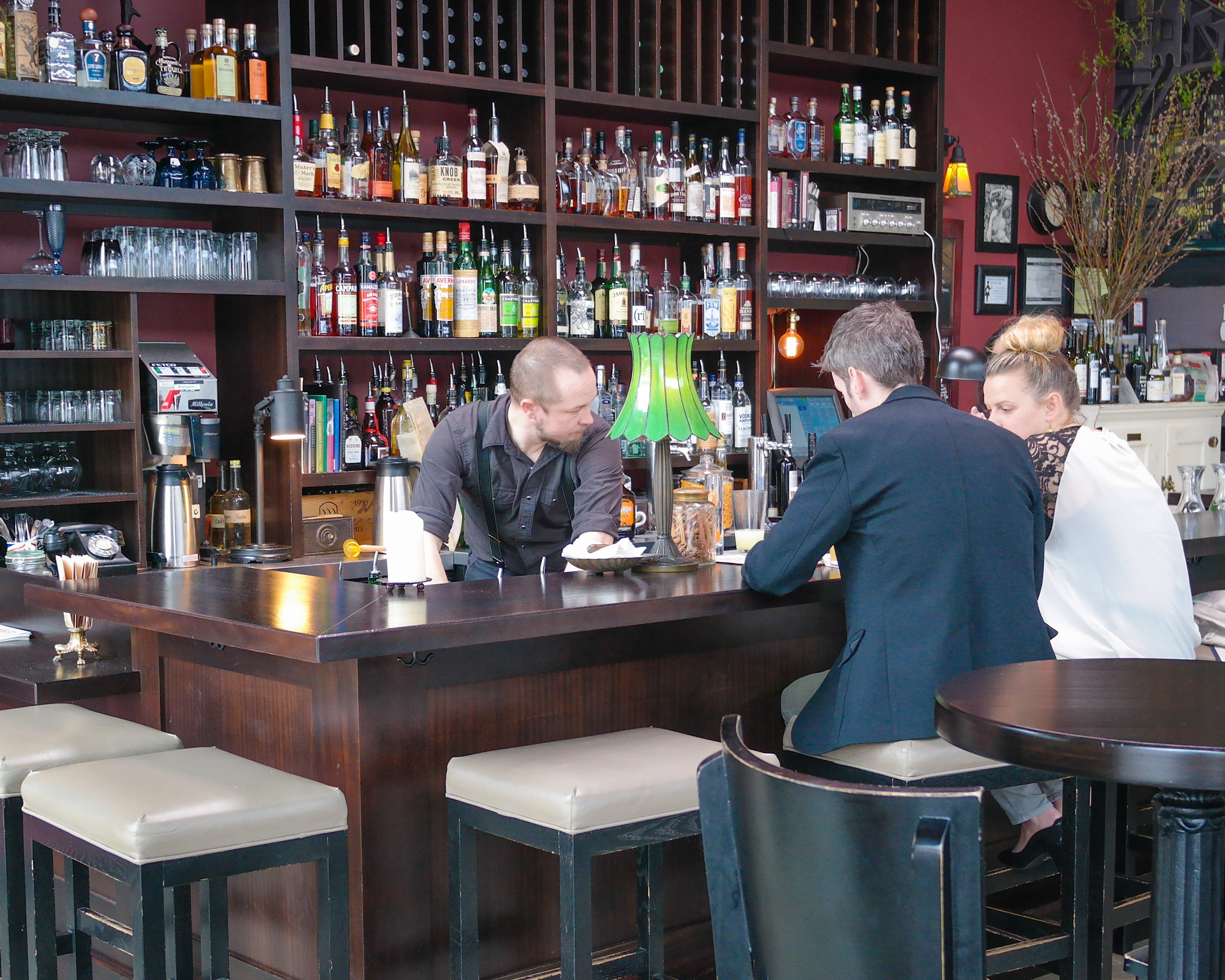
The bar's interior, 2014

Spouses Eric and Shannon McQuilkin are co-owners. In July 2011, The Oregonian described plans for The Box Social to open by the end of the year. The bar opened in late December, in a space that previously housed an art installation by CAP Northwest (formerly Cascade AIDS Project).

The Box Social launched a book club in 2013. In 2025, the bar was among five participating in a "Bazaar Crawl" on North Williams Avenue.

== Reception ==
According to Portland Monthly, "Portland has long considered this candlelit cube a quintessential date spot." Writers for the magazine included The Box Social in a 2012 list of Portland's best new bars. In Thrillist's 2026 overview of Portland's best cocktail bars, Alex Frane wrote, "The Box Social might be the best cocktail bar for dates: it's intimate, warm, and romantic. It's a small space, but rarely overcrowded. The small bites are fine, but take a backseat to the excellent cocktail menu." He also included the bar in Eater Portland's 2020 list of the city's "legit" late-night happy hours. The website's Nathan Williams included The Box Social in a 2024 overview of "delicious" eater on North Williams Avenue. In a 2025 overview of Portland's best romantic bars and restaurants for date nights, Katrina Yentch, Thom Hilton, and Brooke Jackson-Glidden said the bar's happy hour menu and "low-key energy [make] it a great spot for first dates".
