= Chop Chop (Bell X1 album) =

Studio album by Bell X1
- Released: 28 June 2013
- Recorded: 2012–2013, Ireland
- Genre: Rock
- Language: English
- Label: BellyUp Records
- Producer: Thomas Bartlett, Peter Katis

Bell X1 chronology
Bloodless Coup (2011)	Chop Chop (2013)	Arms (2016)

Singles from Chop Chop
- 1. "The End Is Nigh"

Professional ratings
Aggregate scores
Source	Rating
Metacritic	76/100
Review scores
Source	Rating
Allmusic	3.5/5 stars
Consequence of Sound	3.5/5 stars

Chop Chop is the sixth studio album by Irish band Bell X1. It was released on 28 June 2013 in Ireland, Germany and the Netherlands. The album released in the United Kingdom on 1 July 2013 and North America on 2 July 2013.

== The album ==
The album's artwork designed by Alexis Deacon and the album's track listing was revealed on 3 April 2013. The band also revealed a special edition of the album which comes with a chopping board.

== Promo ==
The band completed a short tour in Ireland and the US in 2012 where some of the new tracks were introduced to fans. The band began promotion for the album in March 2013 with the promo release of 'Starlings Over Brighton Pier'. The band announced a number of live dates in the US and Ireland beginning in New York on 7 June 2013 and additional dates in Ireland in Dublin and Cork where they performed at Live at the Marquee. On 25 June 2013 the band streamed their new album through Paste Magazine's website. To celebrate the album's release the band opened up 'Pop-up shops' across the Republic of Ireland. The 'Pop-up Shops' feature sales of the album along with food and each purchase of the album features a voucher where buyers could attend a special acoustic set from the band at each venue. The 'Pop-up Shops' will feature in 10 different locations across the country from June 28 in Dublin and finishing in Limerick on 11 July. A special album launch takes place on 29 June at the National Concert Hall, Dublin.

== Reception ==
The album received positive reviews from critics, with many praising the quick, more acoustic, stripped back sound.

In a 5 star review, The Independent (UK) said "they've created a wholly originally sound -as fresh as a Summer storm." Other significant reviews included Q Magazine who referred to the album as: "a more stately, echo-laden place....hushed and expansive", Magnet: " 4 Stars - a riveting album that finds Bell X1 pushing its established aesthetics in admirably new directions", Mojo: "4 Stars - "oozes zest and focus", Irish Times: "4 Stars - "the best album of their career -a superb album this way comes", USA Today:"Strains of Motown wind through this Stunner", Express (UK) "5 Stars - yes, its that good" & Daily Metro: "5 Stars -they push things further than ever." Chop Chop was Bell X1's 3rd album to debut at No.1 in the Irish Charts & 4th album to be nominated for a Meteor Choice Music Prize for album of the year.

It debuted at No.1 in the Irish Albums Chart, knocking fellow Irish band Kodaline from the top spot.

== Singles ==
The first promo single taken off the album was 'Starlings Over Brighton Pier' debuted on 20 March 2013 along with the music video. On 11 May 2013 the band streamed their first commercial single release from the new album 'The End Is Nigh' on SoundCloud. On 4 June 2013 the band premièred the video for 'The End Is Nigh' on 4 June 2013. This is the first commercial single release from the album.

== Tour ==
Following the album's release the band toured Europe extensively along with live dates across North America. The band would return to perform in 2014 attending a number of European festivals before touring Australia for the first time in summer 2014. The band toured the US in September 2014. The band's last gig in support of Chop Chop will be in Sligo in October 2014.

== Track listing ==
No.	Title	Length
1.	"Starlings Over Brighton Pier"	4:50
2.	"A Thousand Little Downers"	4:50
3.	"Careful What You Wish For"	4:32
4.	"Diorama"	4:46
5.	"I Will Follow You"	3:38
6.	"Drive-By Summer"	3:18
7.	"Motorcades"	4:11
8.	"Feint Praise"	3:09
9.	"The End Is Nigh"	4:03
