= Live at the Marquee (festival) =

Concert festival in Cork, Ireland

Coordinates: 51.89927°N 8.44065°W

- Genre: Live music, comedy, dance
- Dates: May–July
- Locations: Docklands, Centre Park Road, Cork, Ireland
- Years active: 2005–2019, 2022-
- Website: https://aikenpromotions.com/events/live-at-the-marquee/

Live at the Marquee is a season of music concerts and other live performance events organised by Aiken Promotions in a large marquee in Cork, Ireland, every summer since 2005. A concert is held most evenings with the festival usually running from the end of May to late June/early July; tickets for each night are sold separately, with varying lineups and pricing. Acts have represented many genres of popular music, including rock, folk, electronic, hip hop, rhythm and blues, and country; as well as stand-up comedy acts.

The first season was part of Cork's 2005 year as European Capital of Culture. It proved successful enough to be repeated annually. The venue for the first two years was the Cork Showgrounds, then owned by the Munster Agricultural Society. When the Showgrounds were acquired by the Munster GAA for its redevelopment of the adjoining Páirc Uí Chaoimh stadium, Live at the Marquee moved to an adjacent site previously used by Ford as a vehicle distribution centre. In 2018 National Asset Management Agency (NAMA), which had acquired the site after the 2008 economic crash, announced that it would be selling it. Aiken Promotions said it would seek an alternative site for further seasons of Live at the Marquee. The 2020-21 events were cancelled as part of the response to the COVID-19 pandemic in Ireland.

The event has attracted many well-known names in the music industry to perform including Little Mix, Elton John, JLS, Ellie Goulding, 50 Cent, Diana Ross, Bob Dylan, Kanye West, Lady Gaga, The Script, Pink, Christy Moore, Jason Derulo, Eric Clapton, Flo Rida, Jay-Z, Morrissey, Neil Young, Paul Simon, Anastacia, Jessie J, Olly Murs, Steps, Meat Loaf, Kesha, Picture This, Jedward, Ne-yo, Snoop Dogg, Lana Del Rey, Alexandra Burke and Sting.

== Previous years ==
=== 2005 ===
Festival logo

The 2005 festival was a two-week affair combining music and comedy and took place in a specially designed marquee designed by Kellie Clarke marquees (with a capacity of 4,000) in the Cork Showgrounds between 30 June and 17 July. Beach Boy Brian Wilson launched the Cork 2005 Marquee with his first ever appearance in the city of Cork. 2005 performances included:

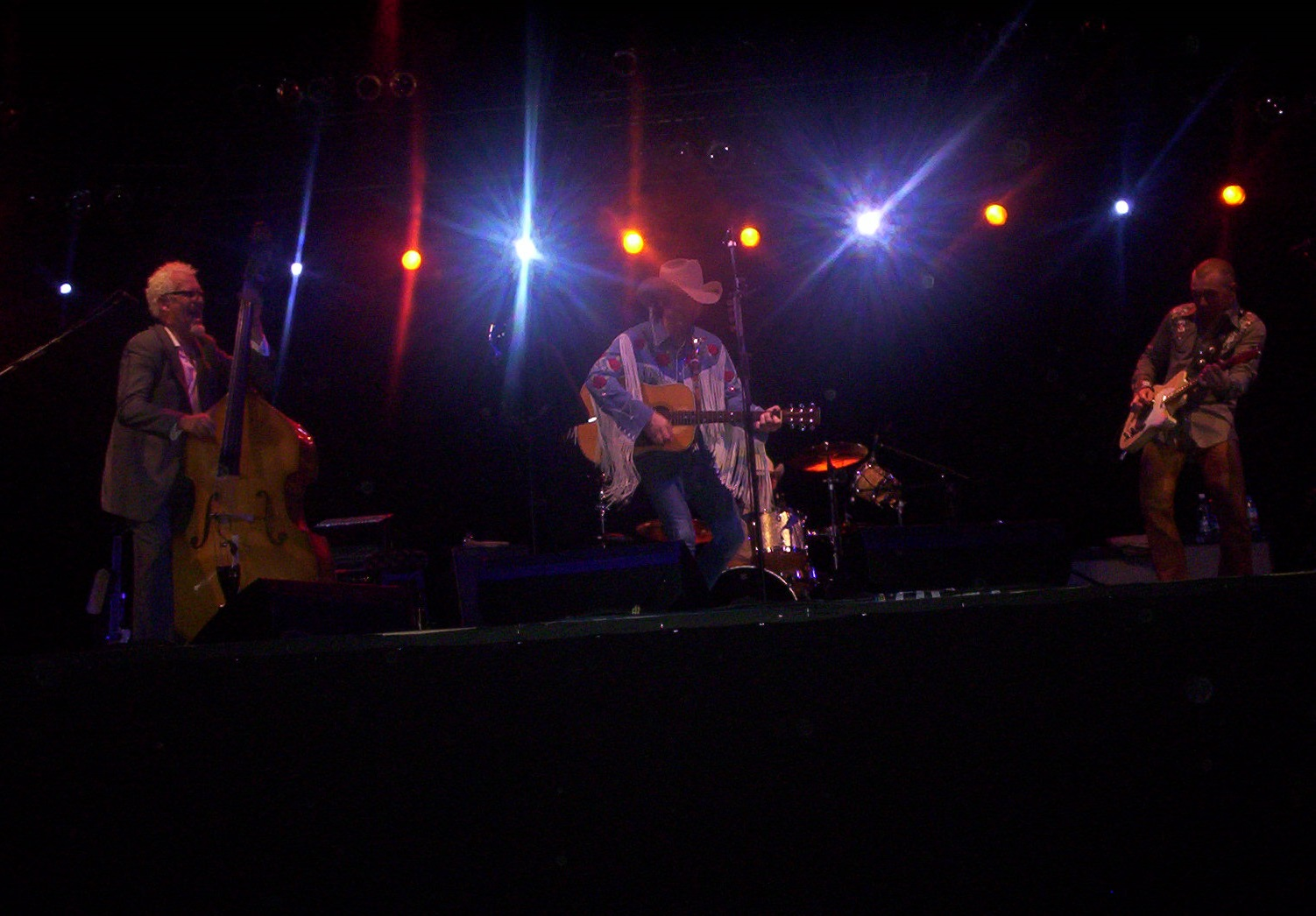
Dwight Yoakam performing in 2005

- Brian Wilson – 30 June
- Aslan with special guest George Murphy – 1 July
- Brian McFadden – 2 July
- Diana Ross – 3 July
- Gipsy Kings – 4 July
- Al Green with special guests Gabrielle and Amos Lee – 5 July
- Nick Cave – 6 July
- Van Morrison – 7 July
- Paul Brady with special guest Cara Dillon – 8 July
- Tommy Tiernan – 10 July
- Dwight Yoakam with special guest BR5-49 – 12 July
- Paddy Casey with special guest Declan O'Rourke – 14 July
- Damien Dempsey with special guests The Frank and Walters & Fred −15 July
- Ronan Keating – 16 July
- Christy Moore – 17 July
- McFly

=== 2006 ===
Live at the Marquee 2006 took place in the Cork Showgrounds between June and July. Headlining acts included Bob Dylan, Roger Waters, The Frames and Des Bishop. The 2006 festival featured:

- Christy Moore – 23 June
- David Gray with Simple Kid – 24 June
- Bob Dylan – 25 June
- Art Garfunkel – 28 June
- Roger Waters – 29 June
- The Frames – 30 June
- Kanye West – 2 July
- Kanye West – 3 July
- Robert Plant with Revere – 5 July
- Roxy Music with Jodavino – 6 July
- Des Bishop – 7 July

=== 2007 ===
It was decided that in 2007 the event would relocate to The Docklands on Centre Park Road in Cork. Bell X1 frontman Paul Noonan later said of their 2007 performance, "Without doubt, the Marquee gig in 2007 was one of the best gigs of our entire Flock tour. We had played venues like The Lobby, The Savoy and the Opera House, but being asked to play the Marquee was a crowning moment for us". The 2007 festival lineup included:

- Faithless – 20 June
- Antony and the Johnsons – 21 June
- Comedy Circus – 23 June (CANCELLED)
- Podge and Rodge – 24 June
- Slayer – 26 June
- Cascada – 28 June
- Duran Duran – 29 June
- The Who – 30 June
- Bell X1 – 1 July
- Status Quo – 2 July
- The Flaming Lips – 3 July
- 50 Cent – 4 July
- Madness – 5 July
- Christy Moore with Declan Sinnott – 7 July
- Elton John – 9 July
- Lionel Richie – 11 July

=== 2008 ===
Selection of posters for the 2008 festival

The 2008 festival took place from 18 June until 7 July. Shayne Ward opened the festival and Pink returned to close it. Christy Moore returned for a fourth year whilst comedian Tommy Tiernan was originally going to perform on 3 July, but agreed to put his gig back a day to accommodate Paul Simon who was only available to perform on the 3rd. The 2008 festival lineup included:

- Shayne Ward – 18–19 June
- Eric Clapton – 20 June
- Dolly Parton – 21 June
- Lou Reed – 23 June
- Jay-Z – 25 June
- Morrissey – 26 June
- Christy Moore – 28 June
- Meat Loaf – 29 June
- Neil Young – 30 June
- Massive Attack – 1 July
- Tommy Tiernan – 2 July
- Paul Simon – 3 July
- Tommy Tiernan – 4 July
- Tommy Tiernan – 5 July
- Paul Weller – 6 July
- Pink – 7 July

=== 2009 ===
The 2009 festival was launched on 28 November 2008, with the announcement of The Prodigy, Gilbert O'Sullivan, Kasabian, Christy Moore, Josh Ritter and Rod Stewart. On 19 February 2009, a further set of acts were announced – including: Blondie, Simple Minds, Crosby, Stills & Nash, Bell X1, Des Bishop, Mick Flannery/John Spillane, Boyzone and Anastacia. Flo Rida was announced on 9 April 2009. The line-up included:

- Blondie – 17 June [CANCELLED – "due to circumstances out of the organiser's control"]
- The Priests – 17 June
- The Prodigy – 18 June
- Gilbert O'Sullivan – 20 June
- Kasabian – 21 June [CANCELLED – due to "promotional commitments"]
- Tracy Chapman – 22 June
- Chickenfoot – 23 June
- Flo Rida – 24 June
- Simple Minds – 25 June
- Bell X1 – 26 June
- Christy Moore – 27 June
- Boyzone – 28 June
- Crosby, Stills & Nash – 29 June
- Anastacia – 30 June
- Lady Gaga- 1 July
- Josh Ritter with support from Lisa Hannigan – 4 July
- Des Bishop – 5 July
- Ne-Yo – 6 July
- Rod Stewart – 7 July
- Kanye West with support from Kid Cudi – 8 July
- Mick Flannery/John Spillane – 9 July
- 50 Cent – 10 July

=== 2010 ===
Hot Press put together a "special guide" for the festival. The 2010 festival included:

- Megadeth – 14 June
- Chris Brown – 15 June [CANCELLED – due to problems with work visa's]
- JLS – 16 June.
- JLS – 17 June.
- Al Green and Michael McDonald – 19 June.
- Kenny Rogers – 20 June.
- Jackson Browne and David Lindley – 23 June.
- Blondie – 24 June
- Midlake, Camera Obscura, Grizzly Bear and Villagers – 25 June.
- Horslips – 26 June [CANCELLED – due to sudden illness of Jim Lockhart]
- Paul Weller – 27 June
- The Cranberries – 29 June
- Deep Purple – 30 June
- Dara Ó Briain – 1 July
- Dara Ó Briain – 2 July
- Christy Moore and Declan Sinnott – 3 July.
- Snoop Dogg – 5 July
- Westlife – 6 July
- Westlife – 7 July (Announced after previous date sold out within minutes)
- Tony Bennett – 8 July
- Madness – 9 July
- Mamma Mia! – from 20 July until 1 August (16 Shows)

=== 2011 ===
Aiken Promotions announced the first round of acts for the 2011 festival on 26 November 2010. On 31 January 2011, The Frames were announced, followed by Grinderman being announced on 2 February, with Erasure added to the line-up on 14 February. Fleet Foxes were announced as the 10th act for the festival, and Bob Dylan, Tom Jones, Katherine Lynch, Westlife, Paul Simon and a second Imelda May show where added on 7 March. Lil Wayne was added to the line-up on 25 March but this was later cancelled as issues with work permits in the UK caused Lil Wayne's European tour to be cancelled. Katherine Lynch's show was moved to the Cork Opera House. The line-up was:

- The Frames – 11 June
- Erasure – 15 June
- Bob Dylan – 16 June
- Imelda May – 17 June
- Katherine Lynch – 18 June [CANCELLED]
- Tom Jones – 19 June
- Grinderman – 20 June [CANCELLED]
- Paul Simon – 21 June
- Bryan Adams – 22 June
- Imelda May – 23 June (SOLD OUT)
- Alexandra Burke – 24 June
- Christy Moore – 25 June
- Fleet Foxes – 26 June
- Elton John & Band – 28 June
- Bell X1 – 1 July
- Jedward – 2 July
- Jedward (second date) – 23 July.
- Lil Wayne – 4 July [CANCELLED]
- Westlife – 9 July

=== 2012 ===
Aiken Promotions officially announced the first act for the 2012 festival on 7 November 2011, with Christy Moore performing alongside Declan Sinnott on 23 June 2012. 2012 marked the eight consecutive year Christy Moore performed at the festival. Jedward were announced on 18 November. Justice was announced as the third act confirmed for Live at the Marquee on 25 November. Dara O'Briain also made a return to the Marquee in 2012 with 2 dates. Tom Petty & The Heartbreakers were announced on 14 December, as well as shows for The Coronas and Olly Murs. The Ireland team's matches in UEFA Euro 2012 were shown in the marquee. The full line-up included:

- Justice – 7 June
- Tom Petty & The Heartbreakers – 8 June
- Imelda May – 9 June
- Republic of Ireland -V- Croatia – 10 June
- The Specials – 11 June
- Spain -V- Republic of Ireland – 14 June
- The Coronas – 15 June
- Italy -V- Republic of Ireland – 18 June
- Christy Moore and Declan Sinnott – 23 June
- Jedward – 24 & 30 June
- Dara Ó Briain – 28 & 29 June
- Jessie J – 1 & 3 July
- Olly Murs – 4 & 5 July
- Steps – 6 July

=== 2013 ===
The first acts of Live at the Marquee 2013 were announced by Aiken Promotions on 10 December 2012 with ZZ Top, Elton John, Elvis Costello and Christy Moore announced for the festival. The Coronas were announced as the 5th act to perform at LATM 2013. The projected line-up included:

- Olly Murs – 12 June
- Little Mix – 14 June
- The Wanted – 16 June
- The Coronas – 22 June
- Elton John – 23 June
- Elvis Costello & The Imposters – 26 June
- ZZ Top – 27 June
- The National – 28 June
- The Coronas – 29 June
- Sting – 1 July
- Passenger – 2 July
- Ke$ha – 3 July
- Bell X1 – 4 July
- The Boomtown Rats – 5 July
- Christy Moore – 6 July
- Jessie J – 7 July
- Imelda May – 9 July

=== 2014 ===
In late 2013 and early 2014, several acts were announced for the 2014 event, including:

- Cliff Richard – 9 June
- Dolly Parton – 12 June
- The Coronas – 13 June
- Bob Dylan – 16 June
- Tom Jones – 19 June
- Imelda May – 21 June
- Elbow – 24 June
- Robert Plant & The Sensational Space Shifters – 25 June
- Jason Derulo – 26 June
- Biffy Clyro – 27 June
- Bryan Adams – 28 June
- Pixies – 30 June
- The Prodigy – 2 July
- Christy Moore – 5 July
- Paolo Nutini – 8 July
- Neil Young & Crazy Horse – 10 July
- Shane Filan – 11 July
- Mario Rosenstock – 12 July
- The National – 14 July
- Lana Del Rey – 15 July

=== 2015 ===
Acts for the 2015 event included:

- Beck – 16 June
- Billy Idol – 17 June
- The Coronas – 19 June
- Nathan Carter – 21 June
- ZZ Top – 22 June
- Ellie Goulding – 24 June
- Kodaline – 25 June
- Lionel Richie – 27 June
- The Waterboys – 28 June
- Dara Ó Briain – 3 July
- Christy Moore – 4 July
- Van Morrison – 9 July
- Status Quo – 12 July
- Damien Rice – 13 July
- Noel Gallagher's High Flying Birds – 14 July

=== 2016 ===
The 2016 festival (15 June to 13 July) was scheduled to include performances from Slayer, Anthrax, Tom Jones, Imelda May, Chic featuring Nile Rodgers, Little Mix, Olly Murs, The Coronas, Nathan Carter and The Pixies.

=== 2017 ===
Acts, appearing from 9 June to 14 July, included Elton John, Eddie Vedder, Elbow, Cliff Richard, Frankie Valli & the Four Seasons, Bryan Adams, Idina Menzel (cancelled), Emeli Sandé (cancelled), The Coronas, Picture This, Walking on Cars, Nathan Carter, RTÉ 2fm Live with Jenny Greene and the RTÉ Concert Orchestra, Gavin James, Christy Moore, Tommy Tiernan, and Al Porter.

=== 2018 ===
Acts, appearing from 7 June to 14 July, included A-Ha, Don McLean, Bell X1, Gavin James, CHIC featuring Nile Rodgers, Picture This, Jenny Greene and the RTÉ Concert Orchestra, The Script, James Bay, Christy Moore, Nathan Carter, Jack Johnson, Alanis Morissette, Kraftwerk, and The Coronas.

=== 2019 ===
The lineup for the 2019 event included Aslan, Toto, Kris Kristofferson, The Academic, Christy Moore, David Gray, and Hall & Oates.

=== 2022 ===
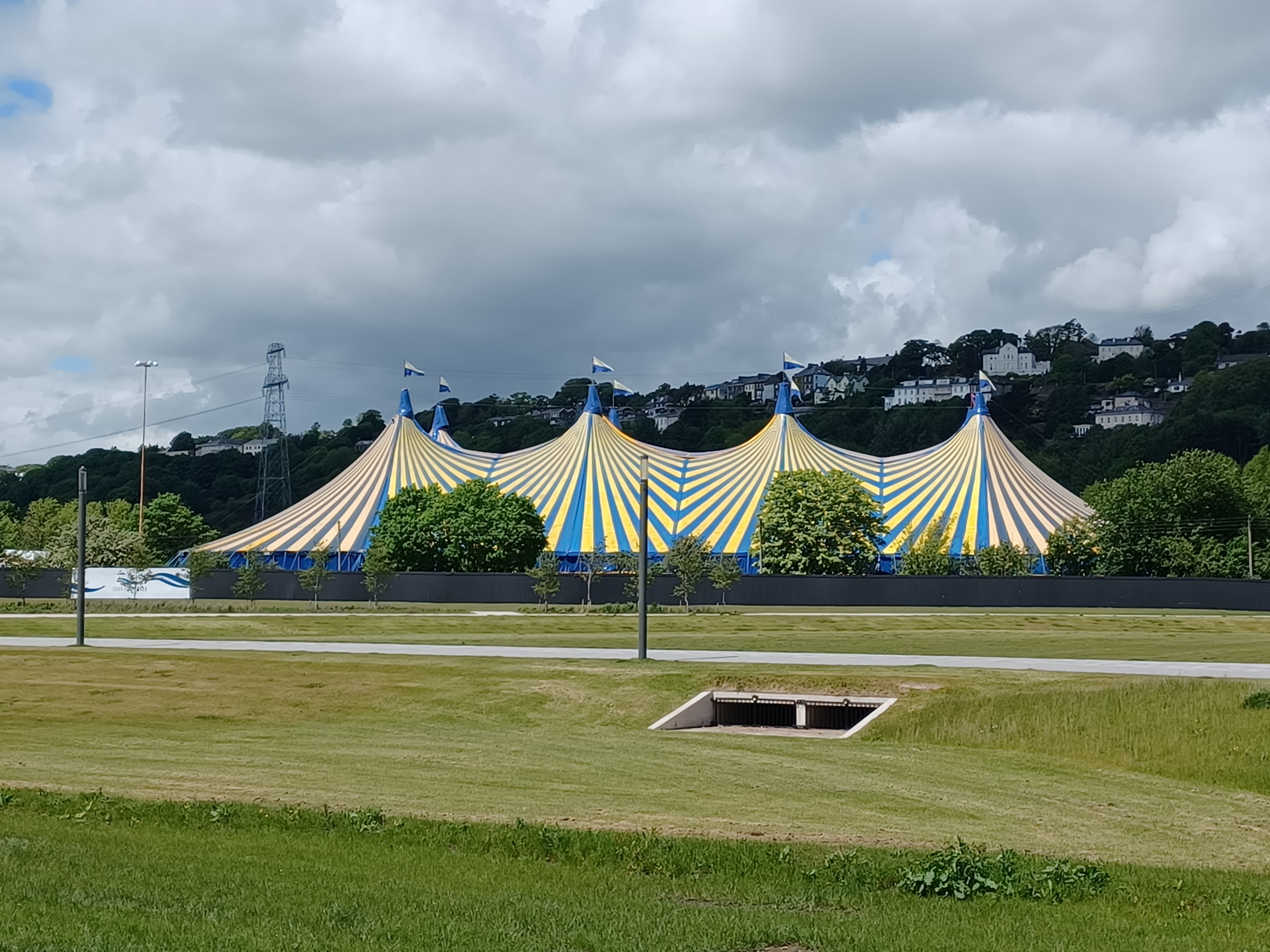
The marquee in May 2022

2022 was the last time the festival played at the Monahan Road in Cork's docklands. Artists who performed include:

- The Coronas – 27 May
- Tom Grennan – 31 May
- Simply Red – 1 June
- Riverdance – 2-5 June
- The National – 6 June
- John Bishop – 9-10 June
- Olly Murs – 11 June
- Deadmau5 – 17 June
- Orbital – 18 June
- Sinead O'Connor – 19 June
- Pet Shop Boys – 22 June
- Dara O'Briain – 23 June
- Christy Moore – 25 June
- Crowded House – 27 June
- Olivia Rodrigo – 29 June. Rodrigo was the headliner and finale for the festival at its previous location.

=== 2023 ===
- The Frames - 2 June
- Bingo Loco XXL - 4 June
- Tommy Tiernan - 8 June and 15 June
- Olly Murs - 9 June
- Bell X1 - 10 June
- Mimi Webb - 16 June
- The Waterboys - 18 June
- Rod Stewart - 20 June
- Jenny Greene and the RTÉ concert orchestra - 23 June
- Sonny Fodera - 24 June
