= Aware (voluntary organisation) =

- Formation: 1985
- Legal status: Non-profit organization
- Purpose: Support organisation for depression
- Location: Offices in Leeson Street, Dublin 2.
- Region served: Ireland
- Chief executive: Dominic Layden
- Website: aware.ie

Aware is a voluntary organisation based in Ireland which aims to assist people affected by depression, bipolar disorder and related mood conditions. Its CEO is Dominic Layden. It is registered as a charity with the Charities Regulator in the Republic of Ireland and the Charity Commission in Northern Ireland.

== Services and programs ==
Aware provides services and information relating to depression, bipolar disorder and related mood conditions. Its services include:

- Support & Self-Care Groups for people who experience depression or bipolar disorder
- Support Line
- Support Mail

Aware also provides several training and education programmes. As of 2022, the organisation stated that "approximately 6,000 adults" had taken part in its adult education programs in the previous 12 months. Aware also has school programmes for senior cycle students: Life Skills for Schools and a Beat the Blues talk.

As of 2011, the charity reportedly had 400 volunteers.

== Fundraising ==
Aware relies heavily on the support of individuals, communities and companies to help run their programmes each year, with 83% of its funding coming from fundraising activities. In addition to external fundraising, Aware have an annual Harbour2Harbour walk on St. Patrick's Day as well as a Christmas Run in December.
