= Juniper (band) =

Irish rock band

- Origin: County Kildare, Ireland
- Genres: Rock, pop rock
- Years active: 1991–1998
- Label: Polygram Ireland
- Members: Damien Rice (Dodi Ma); Paul Noonan; Brian Crosby; Dominic Phillips; David Geraghty

Juniper were an Irish rock band from County Kildare, most widely known today as a precursor to Damien Rice and Bell X1. The band consisted of Rice (under the pseudonym Dodi Ma), Paul Noonan, Brian Crosby, Dominic Phillips and David Geraghty. They released two extended plays, The J-Plane (1994) and Manna (1996).

The band's only two singles, "Weatherman" and "World Is Dead", charted in Ireland when released in 1998. Juniper also appeared on a compilation album, Natural Born Elvis (1998). They split over creative differences soon after, with Rice going on to have a successful solo career and the remaining members forming Bell X1.

== History ==
=== Early years (1991–1996) ===
Juniper were founded in 1991 by Damien Rice, Paul Noonan, Dominic Phillips and Brian Crosby whilst they were students attending Salesian College secondary school in Celbridge. There was a fifth member a female singer Lisa Thompson that joined for a 2-year period 1991 to 1992, contributing to lead vocals and backing vocals at the time. Noonan played the drums, Phillips and Crosby played guitar, Rice performed vocals. Rice referred to himself as Dodi Ma during Juniper's existence. David Geraghty joined the band later. Geraghty's girlfriend was studying for her Leaving Certificate alongside Rice. Geraghty and Rice met first as the other members were in the United States after obtaining J-1 visas. Geraghty later recalled those days:

"So it was me, and him, and my girlfriend, and he started going out with my girlfriend's friend, and so we were a foursome going around in this Vauxhall Astra. I joined up with the Juniper lads 'cos they had made a demo. I didn't like it, mind, but I thought: they can make a demo, they're serious! And I had been pissing about with all these other musicians, and it was like, stop wasting my time, I wanna do this".

Geraghty contributed to the recording of the band's second EP Manna, released in 1996.

Juniper's first television appearance was on Irish talent show Go For It where they performed a song called "Pillars of Society".

In 1994 the band recorded and independently released an EP entitled The J-Plane and began performing in local bars, including The Kildrought Lounge in Celbridge.

=== PolyGram (1997–1998) ===
Juniper signed a six-album deal with PolyGram. The band began recording sessions at Windmill Lane Studios for single releases that year. Polygram were highly influential in the choice of the first single and pushed for the band to release their most radio-friendly tracks.

Singles "Weatherman" and "World Is Dead" were successful chart entries in 1998. These were the only two singles the band released during their existence. "Weatherman" was released in February 1998, reaching number nine in the Irish Singles Chart and remaining in the chart for seven weeks. This was followed by "World Is Dead" in May, which fared less well and entered the Irish Singles Chart at number nineteen. Despite the positive chart standings and unprecedented live popularity, the critical response to the singles was quite poor in some quarters.

Rice later claimed in an interview with Yahoo that he had hoped to release fan-favourite "Eskimo" as the second single but that he had been effectively overruled by the label. Bootleg material suggests that a studio version of "Eskimo" was recorded during Juniper's Windmill Lane sessions along with a work in progress called "Volcano". That track was never released by Juniper but instead appeared in two new versions on Bell X1's debut album Neither Am I in 2000 (attributed to Crosby, Geraghty, Noonan, Phillips and Rice) and later on Damien Rice's 2002 album O.

=== The end of Juniper (1998) ===
Rice disagreed with the band's record label who wanted Juniper to produce "fast songs". He had written "Eskimo" after experiencing a period of sadness and frustration but the record company would not allow him to release it. This prompted Rice to quit the band. He moved to Tuscany in Italy to work on solo material. The planned album sessions in southern France were cancelled. In an interview several years later Paul Noonan said there were "crisis talks" between the other members about what the future would hold.

The remaining band members opted to continue playing together as Bell X1 with Noonan now as their vocalist. Rice, meanwhile, has become a successful folk artist, most noted for his breakthrough album O which had sold more than two million copies by 2006. "Eskimo", written during his last days with Juniper and recorded with the band at Windmill Lane Studios, was the final track on that album. The Sunday Tribune's Matthew Magee called it "the song that would split Juniper up, that would be their artistic pinnacle, the song that would never be released by any Juniper member in its finest, glossiest, grandest incarnation, recorded at Windmill Lane Studios". Both Bell X1 and Damien Rice have recorded a song called "Volcano" which dates from Juniper and Bell X1's Music in Mouth album features "Tongue", a song on which Rice is credited as co-writer. Rice never credits Bell X1 with any of his songs.

While Ireland now notes Bell X1 and Damien Rice as separate artists, when the former tour the United States they are constantly reminded of Rice by the American media.

== Discography ==
- The J-Plane (EP) 1994
- Manna (EP) 1996
- "Weatherman" (Single) 1998
- "World Is Dead" (Single) 1998
- Natural Born Elvis (Compilation album) 1998
