= Brian Crosby (composer) =

Irish composer and musician (born 1973)

- Born: 12 June 1973 (age 53); Ireland
- Occupations: Composer, musician, producer
- Instruments: Guitar, keyboards, vocals
- Years active: 1990s–present
- Website: briancrosby.com wearecaravanmusic.com

Brian Crosby (born 12 June 1973) is an Irish composer, producer and multi-instrumentalist working primarily in music for film and TV.

== Career ==
Crosby is a founding member of the Irish band Juniper along with Damien Rice and later of Bell X1 along with Paul Noonan, Dominic Phillips and David Geraghty with whom he recorded four records and toured the world extensively between 1996 and 2008.

In 2006, Crosby devised, curated and produced The Cake Sale, a collective that featured high profile members of the Irish music scene including Glen Hansard, Gary Lightbody (Snow Patrol), Lisa Hannigan, Damien Rice, Gemma Hayes, Neil Hannon (The Divine Comedy), The Thrills and Bell X1 along with Nina Persson (The Cardigans), Josh Ritter and Nick Seymour (Crowded House). Having sold double platinum in Ireland, the record was released worldwide, and received further recognition when the song 'Some Surprise' was featured in the ABC drama Grey's Anatomy. All profits from the Cake Sale go to the charity Oxfam. To date The Cake Sale has raised in excess of €300,000.

Crosby now focuses on film scoring and has gained recognition for producing haunting cinematic scores for a range of feature films, documentaries and gallery installations. He has also scored several international commercials, and is the founder of Caravan Music who produce bespoke scores for some of the world's biggest brands.

Crosby was a central collaborator on Starboard Home as part of the Ireland 2016 Centenary Programme. He is a graduate of Trinity College Dublin and has been on the board of directors of the Irish Music Rights Organisation (IMRO) since 2009, and is the Chair of the newly formed Screen Composers Guild of Ireland.

He operates the publishing label Kick the Tyre, and lives with his wife and three children on the south east coast of Ireland.

== Discography ==
- Bell X1 Neither Am I (2000)
- Bell X1 Music in Mouth (2003)
- Bell X1 Flock (2005)
- The Cake Sale (2006)
- Bell X1 Tour De Flock (2007)
- One Day International Blackbird (2008)

== Film scores ==
- The Silent City (co-composer) directed by Ruairi Robinson (2006)
- The German (co-composer) directed by Nick Ryan (2008)
- As If I Am Not There (additional music) directed by Juanita Wilson (2010)
- The Night Nurse (composer) directed by Terence White (2010)
- Some Other Stories (composer) directed by Dzidzeva, Juka, Rosi, Tanovik, Slak (2010)
- The Door Ajar (composer) directed by Paddy Jolley (2011)
- The Other Dream Team (additional music) (2011)
- Stop (composer) directed by Paul Murphy (2013)
- Estranged (composer) directed by Adam Levins (2015)
- Posthumous (co-composer) directed by LuLu Wang (2015)
- The Last Berliner (musician) directed by Gregor Erler (2018)
- The Mercy (musician) directed by James Marsh (2018)
- Mary Magdalene (musician) directed by Garth Davis (2018)
- In Our Own Words (composer) directed by Alan Gilsenan (2018)

== TV series ==
- The Modest Adventures of David O'Doherty (co-composer) (2007)
- Transparent (arranger, mixer) directed by Joey Soloway (2016)
- I Love Dick (co-composer, one episode) directed by Joey Soloway (2016)

== Art installations ==
- This Monkey by Paddy Jolley
- Fall by Paddy Jolley
- Freeze by Paddy Jolley
- Mattresses by Paddy Jolley
- Sitting Room by Paddy Jolley
- Snakes by Paddey Jolley
- The Swimmer by Nicky Grogan / Fergal McCarthy
- From the Mountain by MJ Whelan
