= Blue Lights on the Runway =

Studio album by Bell X1
- Released: 20 February 2009
- Recorded: November 2008, Ireland
- Genre: Rock
- Length: 54:42
- Language: English
- Label: BellyUp
- Producer: Roger Bechirian

Bell X1 chronology
Flock (2005)	Blue Lights on the Runway (2009)	Bloodless Coup (2011)

Singles from Blue Lights on the Runway
- 1. "The Great Defector" Released: 30 January 2009; 2. "The Ribs of a Broken Umbrella" Released: 2009

Professional ratings
Aggregate scores
Source	Rating
Metacritic	73/100
Review scores
Source	Rating
Allmusic	4/5 stars
Planet Sound	8/10

Blue Lights On The Runway is the fourth studio album by Irish band Bell X1. It was released in Ireland on 20 February 2009, and on March 3, 2009, in North America. It is a Choice Music Prize nominated album for Best Irish Album in 2009.

The first single from the album was "The Great Defector" (30 January 2009 in Ireland and 3 February 2009, in the UK and the US).

It has been certified Platinum in Ireland with record sales exceeding 15,000.

== Critical reception ==
The album has been met with much acclaim, and has a Metacritic score of 73/100. Allmusic gave the album 4/5, whilst Planet Sound gave it 8/10.

== Track listing ==
1. "The Ribs of a Broken Umbrella" – 5:27
2. "How Your Heart Is Wired" – 6:14
3. "The Great Defector" – 4:40
4. "Blow Ins" – 4:36
5. "Amelia" – 6:58
6. "A Better Band" – 6:35
7. "Breastfed" – 4:11
8. "Light Catches Your Face" – 5:44
9. "One Stringed Harp" – 5:12
10. "The Curtains Are Twitchin'" – 5:08

== Charts ==
Chart (2009)	Peak Position
Irish Albums Chart	1
U.S. Billboard Top Heatseekers	19
U.S. Billboard Top Independent Albums chart	49
