= Arms (album) =

Studio album by Bell X1
- Released: 14 October 2016
- Recorded: 2015–2016, Ireland
- Genre: Rock
- Language: English
- Label: BellyUp Records

Bell X1 chronology
Chop Chop (2013)	Arms (2016)

Singles from Arms
- 1. "The Upswing"; 2. "Out Of Love"

Arms is the seventh studio album by Irish band Bell X1, released worldwide on 14 October 2016. Recorded in Dublin and County Donegal, Ireland, Arms is the follow-up to 2013's much acclaimed Chop Chop, which was their third number-one album in Ireland and fourth consecutive album to be nominated for a Choice Music Prize.

Arms is a nine-song collection produced by the band, recorded by Tommy McLoughlin (from the Villagers) and Glenn Keating (from Jape), and mixed by Peter Katis (The National, Jónsi) with Ross Dowling mixing the track "Out of Love". The band spent the summer of 2016 touring Ireland with headline shows at the Iveagh Gardens, Galway Arts Festival and Indiependence in Cork. The band previously completed an Irish acoustic tour in autumn 2015.

The artwork for the album was produced by Dutch artist, Mirjam Dijkema.

== Singles ==
The first single from the album is "The Upswing", previously released in June on their bandcamp page and then made available on iTunes. The song was also made available as an instant download for those who pre-ordered the album iTunes. "Out of Love" was revealed as the follow-up single in July 2016.

== Tour ==
The band played a number of live shows in Ireland during mid 2016. The band also played a number of shows across the Republic of Ireland, the UK and Australia later that year.

== Format ==
The album was made available on CD, vinyl and download.

== Track listing ==
1. "Fail Again, Fail Better"
2. "Bring Me A Fire King"
3. "The Upswing"
4. "I Go Where You Go"
5. "Take Your Sweet Time"
6. "Sons & Daughters"
7. "Out of Love"
8. "Fake Memory"
9. "The Coalface"
