= Neither Am I =

Studio album by Bell X1
- Released: 13 October 2000
- Recorded: Ireland
- Genre: Rock
- Length: 47:15
- Label: Universal Music Ireland
- Producer: Nick Seymour

Bell X1 chronology
Neither Am I (2000)	Music in Mouth (2003)

Neither Am I is the debut studio album by Irish band Bell X1, released on 13 October 2000. It features a number of songs previously written and recorded with Damien Rice, the lead singer of the band's former incarnation, Juniper, and with producer and Crowded House bassist, Nick Seymour.

== Track listing ==
All songs written by Brian Crosby, David Geraghty, Paul Noonan and Dominic Philips except where noted.

1. "Pinball Machine" (Crosby, Geraghty, Noonan, Philips, Nick Seymour) – 3:57
2. "The Money" – 4:09
3. "Man on Mir" – 4:04
4. "Volcano" (Crosby, Geraghty, Noonan, Philips, Rice) – 4:37
5. "Slowset" – 3:58
6. "Godsong" – 4:41
7. "Blue Rinse Baby" – 2:51
8. "Offshore" – 4:09
9. "Beautiful Madness" – 4:37
10. "Face" (Crosby, Geraghty, Noonan, Philips, Rice) – 2:54
11. "Little Sister" – 3:33
12. "Deep" – 3:45
