= Antisocial (album) =

Studio album by Turn
- Released: October 30, 2000
- Recorded: 1999–2000
- Genre: Rock
- Label: Infectious Records
- Producer: Hugh Jones

Turn chronology
Check My Ears (2000)	Antisocial (2000)	In Position (2001)

Antisocial is the first full-length album released by Turn, an Irish rock trio from Kells, County Meath. Turn began recording the album around 1998 and one of the tracks ("Beretta") appeared on the Check My Ears EP, which the band released in 2000. The album was released on Infectious Records in 2000 to favourable reviews in both the Irish and British press. Constant touring before and after its release gained the band a wide Irish and UK fan base and they played a host of sell-out shows across the two countries.

== Track listing ==
1. Too Much Make Up (3:00)
2. Beretta (2:55)
3. Antisocial (3:59)
4. These Three Words (4:52)
5. Queen Of My Heart (3:11)
6. My Orbison (3:22)
7. Gav And Anne (3:31)
8. After We Go (2:35)
9. Words (3:44)
10. Tired Love Song (4:50)
11. I Still Believe (4:36)

== Album line up ==
- Ollie Cole - guitars, vocals, piano
- Ian Melady - drums, vocals
- Gavin Fox - bass guitar
