= Music in Mouth =

Studio album by Bell X1
- Released: June 2003
- Recorded: Ireland
- Genre: Rock
- Length: 54:59
- Label: Island
- Producer: Jamie Cullum

Bell X1 chronology
Neither Am I (2001)	Music in Mouth (2003)	Flock (2005)

Professional ratings
Review scores
Source	Rating
Q	4/5 stars
counterculture.co.uk	3.5/5 stars
Hot Press	8.5/10
Irish Independent	5/5 stars

Music in Mouth is the second studio album from Irish band Bell X1, released on 18 July 2003 in Ireland and on 21 July in the UK. It was produced by Jamie Cullum.

The album contains the song, "Eve, the Apple of My Eye".

The title of the album is taken from the poem "The Planters Daughter" by Irish poet Austin Clarke.

== Track listing ==
All songs written by Brian Crosby, David Geraghty, Paul Noonan and Dominic Philips except where noted.

1. "Snakes and Snakes" – 4:00
2. "Alphabet Soup" – 4:56
3. "Daybreak" – 5:12
4. "Eve, the Apple of My Eye" – 5:37
5. "Next To You" – 3:59
6. "West Of Her Spine" – 3:23
7. "Bound For Boston Hill" – 4:52
8. "Tongue" (Crosby, Geraghty, Noonan, Philips, Damien Rice) – 5:23
9. "White Water Song" – 2:42
10. "In Every Sunflower" – 5:53
11. "I'll See Your Heart And I'll Raise You Mine" – 5:09
12. "Eve, the Apple of My Eye" (single version) – 4:06
