= Turn (band) =

Irish band

- Origin: Kells / Dublin; Ireland
- Genres: Indie, Indie rock
- Years active: 1998–2006, 2012, 2013, 2014
- Labels: Setanta Records; Infectious Records; Nurture Records
- Past members: Ollie Cole; Ian Melady; Gavin Fox; Alan Lee; Ciaran Kavanagh

Turn are an Irish band.

== History ==
Turn formed in 1998 when lead singer/guitarist Ollie Cole and drummer Ian Melady joined forces with Dublin bass player Gavin Fox, whom they met at a local recording studio. Cole and Melady had been friends since youth and had previously formed Pixies-influenced punk band Swampshack.

Through frantic gigging and the release of a few choice 7" singles, Turn started to earn a name for themselves and soon found themselves signed to Infectious Records. Their debut album, Antisocial, soon followed and Turn looked to be on their way to stardom. Infectious, however, were not too interested in releasing any singles from the album and Turn soon found themselves in record company limbo once again.

With their schedule clear, Turn hit the road again playing gigs to get funds for more recording. The In Position EP was the fruit of these labours, a six track snapshot on their own Nurture label in March 2002 which was a taster of what was to come. A double a-side Another Year Over/Summer Song was released in July 2002 with the single going Top 30 in Ireland in its first week. However, Turn's luck was soon to catch up with them again as bassist Gavin Fox left to join Idlewild. His last gig with Turn was on New Year's Eve 2002.

Fox's place was filled by ex-Skindive bassist Alan Lee and recording continued for Turn's second album Forward which was released in May 2003. The album entered the charts at number 16 and became one of the most popular Irish albums of the year. They continued touring through 2003 and 2004 adding Guitarist/Keyboardist, Martin Quinn, who had played with Ian Melady in Little Palace, to the lineup. More bass trouble hit when Alan Lee left and Ollie Cole held open auditions in Dublin for a new bassist. Ciaran Kavanagh of The Rags soon joined up. In the meantime, Turn signed on with Setanta Records and began work on their third album.

Turn's third album Turn LP, eponymous titled, was released in Ireland in September 2005 and entered the Top 30 in its first week. It is due for release in the UK in early 2006. It was shortlisted for the inaugural Choice Music Prize, an industry award to promote quality Irish musicians and bands, and the album was also nominated for the 2006 Meteor Award, while Turn were nominated for "Best Irish Band". They lost on both counts to U2, while that year's Choice Music Prize went to Julie Feeney.

In December 2005, Gavin Fox rejoined for a series of gigs. On 18 July 2006, the group announced that Turn planned one more tour of Ireland, before breaking up. Ollie also added "this has not been an easy decision to make". The band never played this tour. As of 19 July 2006, the www.turn.ie website was shut down.

In August 2012, Ollie Cole announced on his Facebook page that he, along with Gavin Fox, Ian Melady and Ciaran Kavanagh had been rehearsing, and would be performing as Turn for the first time in more than five years at the Electric Picnic in Stradbally, County Laois. He also suggested the possibility of further gigs.

The performance at Electric Picnic was followed by a small Irish tour in December 2012 to say farewell. Turn played their last show in the Spirit Store, Dundalk on 30 December 2012. On 24 October 2013, Turn announced a new show for 28 December 2013.

== References in popular culture ==
Turn's music has featured in two U.S. television shows, One Tree Hill, with the song "Close Your Eyes" and Kyle XY, in two separate episodes with the songs "All These Days" and "It's About Nothing".

The 2005 film Boy Eats Girl features the songs "Stop" and "Harder".

Australian soap, Home and Away featured the songs "Close Your Eyes" and "Stop" in 2013.

== Discography ==
Turn discography
- Studio albums: 3
- Extended plays: 2

=== Studio albums ===
| Year | Album details | Peak chart positions |
| Year | Album details | IRL |
|---|---|---|
| 2000 | Antisocial: Released: Oct 30, 2000; Label: Infectious; Formats: CD, Download | — |
| 2003 | Forward: Released: May 30, 2003; Label: Nurture; Formats: CD, Download | 16 |
| 2005 | Turn: Released: Sep 23, 2005; Label: Setanta; Formats: CD, Download | 30 |
"—" denotes a title that did not chart.

=== EPs ===
1. Check My Ears
2. In Position

=== Singles ===
1. "Facedown" (7")
2. "Beretta" (7")
3. "Beeswax" (7")
4. "Too Much Make Up" (Released as two song 7" and CD Single. The CD version included a third track "Friends", that did not appear on the 7")
5. "The Christmas" EP (7")
6. "Another Year Over" / "Summer Song" (No. 22 in Irish Chart)
7. "Summer Song" (CD - One Song Promo release only)
8. "Even Though" (CD Radio Promo and Free download)
9. "It's About Nothing" (Radio Promo Only CD Single)
10. "Stop" (Radio Promo Only CD Single)
11. "It's A Waste Of My Time" (Radio Promo Only CD Single)
