= Flock (Bell X1 album) =

Studio album by Bell X1
- Released: 14 October 2005
- Studio: Westland Studios, Dublin, Ireland
- Genre: Rock
- Length: 51:40
- Label: Island
- Producer: Roger Bechirian

Bell X1 chronology
Music in Mouth (2003)	Flock (2005)	Tour De Flock (2007)

Professional ratings
Aggregate scores
Source	Rating
Metacritic	72/100
Review scores
Source	Rating
AllMusic	4/5 stars
Pitchfork	2.2/10

Flock is the third studio album by Irish band Bell X1. It was released on 14 October 2005 in Ireland, 20 March 2006 in the UK and 19 February 2008 in North America. The album was ranked number 15 in Planet Sound's top albums of 2006. Flock was Bell X1's first number-one album in Ireland.

Three singles were released from the album in Ireland, "Bigger Than Me" (30 September 2005 in Ireland and 10 October 2005 in the UK), "Flame" (16 March 2006) and "Rocky Took a Lover", which was eventually released on 28 August 2006 after gaining cult popularity from radio airplay.

== Critical reception ==
The album has had strong reviews from critics, and has a Metacritic score of 72/100. The Sunday Times gave the album 5/5, whilst both Allmusic and Paste Magazine gave it 4/5. Planet Sound gave the album 8/10.

== Track listing ==
1. "Reacharound" – 3:10
2. "Flame" – 3:53
3. "Rocky Took a Lover" – 4:10
4. "He Said She Said" – 4:25
5. "Bad Skin Day" – 5:56
6. "Natalie" – 3:54
7. "Bigger Than Me" – 3:52
8. "Just Like Mr Benn" – 4:27
9. "My First Born for a Song" – 5:25
10. "Trampoline" – 4:48
11. "Lamposts" – 7:40

=== US track listing ===
1. "Rocky Took a Lover"
2. "Flame"
3. "Eve, The Apple of My Eye"
4. "My First Born for a Song"
5. "Bigger than Me"
6. "Bad Skin Day"
7. "Natalie"
8. "Reacharound"
9. "Just Like Mr. Ben"
10. "He Said, She Said"
11. "Trampoline"
12. "Lamposts"
