= Bell X1 (band) =

Irish rock band

- Origin: Lucan, Dublin, Ireland
- Genres: Alternative, indie rock, synth-pop, new wave, folk rock, electronica
- Years active: 1999–present
- Labels: Island, PIAS, Warner Bros., BellyUp Records
- Members: Paul Noonan; David Geraghty; Dominic Philips
- Past members: Brian Crosby
- Website: www.bellx1.com

Bell X1 are an Irish rock band from County Kildare. The group consists of Paul Noonan (lead vocals, guitar, percussion, keys), David Geraghty (guitar, vocals, keys, percussion, banjo, piano, harmonica) and Dominic Phillips (bass, vocals).

They have performed on the Late Show with David Letterman and their music also has appeared in popular drama series such as the TV series Grey's Anatomy and The O.C.

Bell X1 are known for regular changes in sound from album to album, their range taking in alternative, indie, hard rock, post-punk, acoustic, lo-fi, folk rock, ballad, pop, synth-pop, new wave and electronica. They have been compared to The Blue Nile, Talking Heads, David Bowie, Radiohead, The Flaming Lips, Coldplay, U2, Animal Collective, Elbow and Talk Talk.

== History ==
=== Juniper ===
The trio began life as members of the alternative rock band Juniper, along with former Bell X1 member Brian Crosby and singer-songwriter Damien Rice. The quintet had garnered a level of interest in the Irish music press and had built up a live following. In 1998, having signed a multi-album deal with PolyGram and releasing two top-20 singles, Rice quit the band just as Juniper were preparing to record their debut LP in France.

With a body of songs already accumulated, the remaining four members decided to continue, with Noonan swapping drums for vocals and Paul "Binzer" Brennan coming in on percussion duties. The name Bell X1 was adopted after Noonan read Tom Wolfe's 1979 non-fiction book The Right Stuff, in which the aircraft of the same name makes history by breaking the sound barrier.

=== Neither Am I ===
Juniper's original contract with Polygram Ireland was moved to Island Records UK, and the band released their debut LP, Neither Am I, on 13 October 2000. It was preceded by the singles "Pinball Machine" and "Man on Mir", both of which would become live favourites. The album also featured two collaborations with Rice from the Juniper days, "Face" and "Volcano" (Rice would release his solo version of the latter on his 2002 debut album, O). The album was produced by Nick Seymour of Crowded House in The Windings studio, Wales and mixed at Mute Records in London. It achieved gold sales in Ireland despite mixed reviews.

=== Music in Mouth ===
In late summer, 2001, the band decamped to Wexford to write songs for what would be their second LP. They entered Ridge Farm Studio in Surrey, England in 2002 with producer Jamie Cullum and released Music In Mouth in July 2003 in Ireland and then the UK on Island. Singles released from the album included "Snakes & Snakes", "White Water Song", "Tongue", "Next To You", "Alphabet Soup" and "Eve, the Apple of My Eye", four of which went top-40 in the Irish charts. The album went double platinum in Ireland.

Taking its title from a line in the poem "The Planter's Daughter" by Austin Clarke, the album received positive reviews and the band began to perform support slots with Snow Patrol, Starsailor, Keane, Aqualung and Tom McRae.

John Meagher of the Irish Independent named Music In Mouth the fourth-best Irish album of the 2000s and the 30th-best of all time, while RTÉ's Harry Guerin described it as a band "pushing themselves in different directions and coming up with a joy and sadness that prove as contagious as each other [...] a band thinking outside the a, b, c of guitar rock". Hot Press magazine described the record as "more unified, distinctive and cohesive" offering than Neither Am I that showcased the band's "multiple directions", while Entertainment.ie claimed that the album should see Bell X1 at the forefront of a new Dublin rock movement.

Two tracks from the album, "In Every Sunflower" and "Eve, the Apple of My Eye", were used in the TV drama The O.C. The latter soundtracked a lesbian kiss between Olivia Wilde and Mischa Barton and was selected for inclusion on the compilation The OC Mix 4. Looking to capitalise on this, the band played their first ever US shows in New York's Mercury Lounge and the Viper Room in Los Angeles in 2003. 2004 also saw Bell X1 open for former bandmate Damien Rice on one of the singer-songwriter's New York dates.

=== Flock ===
Summer 2004 saw Bell X1 return to Wexford on the South-east of Ireland to commence writing on what would become their third long-player, Flock. Following a headline show in Dublin's Olympia Theatre in December 2004, the band entered Dublin's Westland Studios in early 2005 to record with producer Roger Bechirian and engineer Phil Hayes. In June of that year, the band recorded a live session for Nic Harcourt's Morning Becomes Eclectic radio show on KCRW in Los Angeles.

"Bigger Than Me" was the first single to be taken from the album and went to No.16 in Ireland in September 2005. It was followed on 14 October by the release of Flock itself. It went straight to No.1 in the album charts in Ireland where it would go on to sell five-times platinum.

The album was met with largely positive reviews. On Metacritic it holds a score of 72 out of 100. The Boston Globe deemed that the record displayed the group's "musicality and charm", while RTÉ's Kate Moten described the album as "an accomplished collection from a clever and inventive band, whose talent deserves heapings of praise".

Following a sold-out performance in Dublin's 5,000-capacity RDS Main Hall on 31 January 2006, the band released "Flame", which entered the Irish singles charts at No.12 that March. George Whyte of the Irish Independent reported that Bell X1 "received a more passionate welcome than anyone else" during their Main Stage appearance at Oxegen music festival that summer. The third and final single to be lifted from Flock was "Rocky Took A Lover", the song having become a highlight of the Bell X1’s live setlist. Both songs remain on heavy rotation on Irish radio to this day.

Flock was subsequently released in Europe and the US in Spring 2008, the latter territory given a rejigged tracklist that incorporated "Eve, the Apple of My Eye" in order to springboard the band to wider attention stateside.

=== Tour De Flock and departure of Brian Crosby ===
"Yeah, that was a very different thing, very pressured. We had to make sure it went well on the night in a venue we grew up seeing bands in. It was full tilt, all bells and whistles and lots of production."

— Paul Noonan on recording Tour de Flock, State.ie

In February 2007, Bell X1 parted company with Island Records after the UK label's roster was affected by mergers and buyouts. Although Island offered the group a new deal after Flock, Bell X1 opted to go independent and release records through their own BellyUp label. In June 2007, to coincide with becoming the first Irish act to headline Dublin's Malahide Castle, the group put out Tour de Flock, a two-disc concert album and live DVD of Bell X1’s sold-out Point Theatre homecoming show the previous December. The band rounded off 2007 by playing the Other Voices festival.

On 15 March 2008, while on tour in the US, the band's tour bus burst into flames outside their hotel in Medford, Massachusetts. Noonan and Geraghty were on board the vehicle alongside their manager and a friend. Fire fighters were called to the scene shortly after 3:30am and spent 90 minutes fighting the blaze which had caused an estimated $50,000 worth of damage. The band and crew were able to get all equipment and instruments off the vehicle undamaged. After sourcing a replacement vehicle, the band travelled to New York City where they played a sell-out show in the Bowery Ballroom, followed by a performance of "Rocky Took A Lover" on the Late Show with David Letterman. Other North American television appearances during that Spring 2008 tour included MTV Canada, The Late Late Show with Craig Ferguson and Late Night with Conan O'Brien.

Bell X1 would return to North America for a fourth time in 2008 as special guests of Canadian indie act Stars on their September tour. Shortly afterwards, in October, founding member Brian Crosby announced that he was parting ways with the band to pursue a career as a producer and film composer. In a statement, Crosby said: "It's been an extraordinary privilege to be in a band with your mates for more than 15 years. I'm really grateful for everything I got to do with Bell X1, for all the adventures we had and for the great support of our fans. It's been particularly wonderful to have connected with so many people and to have got to meet people all over the world doing what I love. I look forward to continue making those connections. At the same time I'll be applauding the boys continued success." His final show with Bell X1 was the closing night of the Flock tour in October 2008.

=== Blue Lights on the Runway ===
Having undergone such significant changes, the band wanted to regroup after coming out of a "speed wobble". In late 2008, they decamped to Ballycumber House, Offaly in the midlands of Ireland for pre-production on what would be their fourth LP and their first studio release on their own independent label. Touring drummer Tim O'Donovan accompanied them as did engineer Phil Hayes. Noonan and Geraghty set out to write traditionally on guitar and piano and then "dress" the songs in beats and electronic flourishes. A digital guitar known as a Casio DG-20 was acquired prior to song-writing sessions for the album and Noonan attributes this to the album's "playful" and "goofy" nature. Self-produced by the band, Blue Lights On the Runway was recorded in Ballycumber House and mixed by Phil Hayes.

"With this album I went away and wrote a lot of the songs by myself, with a computer, and software synths and beats and stuff, before bringing it to the band. Dave and I worked a lot together too. We had this singular idea before making the effort that we would take a song that we had the backbone of, and then dress it up with noises and beats and stuff, and we'd never really done that before. That worked in some cases, but it sounded really gratuitous in others, so we peeled it back. Which is why we have something of a mongrel on our hands again."

— Paul Noonan on writing Blue Lights On The Runway, Totally Dublin.

Ahead of the LP hitting shelves, Bell X1 put out a lead single in the form of "The Great Defector" on 30 January 2009 (3 February in the US and UK). Peaking at No.3 in the Irish charts as well as going Top 10 in the US AAA Radio charts, the song remains the band's most enduring radio hit to this day.

Blue Lights On the Runway was released in Ireland on 20 February 2009, and in the US on 3 March. It went straight to No.1 in the Irish album charts and went Top 20 stateside in the Billboard Top Heatseekers Chart. The record received generally favourable reviews both sides of the Atlantic and holds a Metacritic aggregate rating of 73/100. Billboard described the album as having "cold, wonderous Radiohead-esque moments within a warmer sound all their own" while NPR praised the record's "artfully constructed songs and offbeat lyrics". PopMatters described the album as "delicate", "expansive" and Bell X1’s best work to date. The album was nominated for the Choice Music Prize that year.

Within weeks of each other, the band had performed "The Great Defector" on two primetime late-night chat shows in both Ireland (Tubridy Tonight) and the US (a return visit to The Late Show With David Letterman). Letterman hailed the song as "fantastic" afterwards. Irish Independent journalist Eamon Sweeney described the song as "the best thing on the airwaves at the moment". "The Ribs of a Broken Umbrella", the second single to be taken from Blue Lights On The Runway, was later released.

With Marc Aubele replacing Crosby on keys and Rory Doyle on drums, the band toured heavily in promotion of the new record, with arena shows at Summer festivals in Europe including Festival Internacional de Benicàssim, Spain, Electric Picnic, Ireland and Live at The Marquee, Cork, Ireland. The band also supported U2 on the last show of their three-night residency in Dublin's Croke Park. After some dates in the US at the end of the Summer – including the Austin City Limits Festival – the band returned to Ireland for two sell-out homecoming shows in Dublin's Olympia Theatre as well as a live session at Other Voices (broadcast in early 2010).

=== Bloodless Coup ===
"With the five piece band there is no imagining the parts... We can realise all the parts at once, it's the only way to get the full picture when recording. There's no more imagining sounds and parts that have yet to be recorded."

— – David Geraghty, Galway Advertiser

In Summer 2010, the band went into a rehearsal room in preparation for recording their fifth studio album. Marc Aubele and Rory Doyle now completed the line-up, something the band has credited with making writing sessions more streamlined. Bloodless Coup was recorded in Grouse Lodge studios in Ireland with Rob Kirwan (Depeche Mode, PJ Harvey, Hozier), a longtime friend of the band from the Juniper days. It was recorded mostly live with some minimal overdubbing.

Noonan's lyrics were once again a talking point of the new record. Members of the band had recently begun families while at the same time seeing friends losing their own parents, a theme touched upon in "Built To Last", "Nightwatchmen" and "74 swans". Songs like "Sugar High" as well as the very album title itself, meanwhile, saw Noonan reflect on the perversities and injustices of the harsh economic downturn that had recently hit Ireland. In his four-star review in the Irish Independent, John Meagher praised Bell X1 for being one of the few bands to lyrically tackle the "turbulent, uncertain times".

The album was released on 1 April 2011. Ahead of its release, Bell X1 released the track "Hey Anna Lena" on 18 January before an official single, "Velcro", on 1 March. The album received mixed reviews with a Metacritic score of 58/100 based on reviews from 5 critics. State called the LP "an emphatic return to form", commenting that the band sounded "rejuvenated". Entertainment.ie noted that it felt as if the band were "hungering for something new" on the record, and that they deserved kudos for "refusing to make music for anyone but themselves". The feeling was echoed by a review on Addict Music that felt the music on Bloodless Coup was "hinting at a new direction". The Sunday Times named Bloodless Coup its CD of The Week in a 5 star review, while the Boston Herald gave the record an "A" grading, calling the songwriting and playing "superb".

On 5 April, NPR recorded a special live concert by the group at Dublin's Guinness Storehouse before 27 May saw the band play a rooftop set at Facebook's European HQ in Dublin in the presence of founder Mark Zuckerberg.

Besides extensive touring in Europe and the US, Bell X1 played headline shows that year in Marlay Park, Galway Arts Festival and Cork's Live At The Marquee. The band added a date at Dublin's Olympia Theatre to their winter tour in order to stage a benefit concert for homeless charity Capuchin Day Centre. It was reported that the show raised €20,285 and that the centre received a further €225,000 due to the awareness raised.

=== Field Recordings ===
In early May 2012, Bell X1 announced that they would be releasing a two-disc collection of 21 live acoustic tracks and tour photographs entitled Field Recordings. The audio-visual compendium was captured by the band's long-time engineer Phil Hayes, and taken from shows both in Europe as well as North America where the band had stripped their arrangements down to guitars, piano and an iPod. The release, which featured tracks from across their entire catalogue, was only made available via the group's webstore.

Hot Press magazine praised the album, calling it "an essential purchase for both fans and newcomers alike… It reminds you once again just what a great songwriter Paul Noonan is, with his carefully crafted miniatures about love and life." Like Hot Press, State awarded it four stars, calling it "a keeper for die-hard fans and a great introduction for the new ones".

=== Chop Chop ===
"It was a new way of doing things and we were excited by that. We brought nothing with us except a couple of guitars. Peter and Thomas got involved in turning a longlist of songs into a shortlist. And Thomas gets stuff done – we named the album in honour of his work tempo."

— – Dominic Philips on working with Thomas Bartlett, The Story So Far

Summer of 2012 saw Bell X1 convene in Geraghty's home studio to demo a new batch of songs for what would become the group's sixth studio LP. Unlike Bloodless Coup, there was no overarching thematic thread to Noonan's lyrics this time but the song "A Thousand Little Downers" did touch on some of the social commentary themes found in the previous record.

On 8 January 2013, RTÉ reported that the band had begun work on a new album at Tarquin Studios in Bridgeport, Connecticut with producer Peter Katis (The National) and composer and producer Thomas Bartlett (The Gloaming, Sufjan Stevens, Martha Wainwright). The trio found themselves energised by the approach of Katis and Bartlett, resulting in a recording process that took just two weeks.

Chop Chop was released on 28 June 2013 and premiered at a sell-out date at Dublin's National Concert Hall the following night. It became the third Bell X1 LP to enter the Irish charts at No.1 and is among the best reviewed studio album releases in the band's career, holding a 76/100 score on review aggregation website Metacritic, based on reviews from 7 critics. Writing in Mojo, James McNair praised the record's "zest and focus", while the Independent on Sunday deemed it "Funny, sad, perfect". Q Magazine gave the album three stars, conceding that "the more you ignore Bell X1, it seems, the better they get".

Back in Ireland, music journalist Tony Clayton Lea, reviewing in the Irish Times, said Chop Chop was the best album of Bell X1’s career to date. Hot Press magazine said that the band's back-to-basics approach on the new record had yielded "powerful results". It was the fourth Bell X1 album to be nominated for the Choice Music Prize for album of the year.

To connect with their audience while promoting the release in Ireland, the band opened "Pop-up shops" at 10 different venues on the tour where fans could access vouchers to attend special acoustic sets. There was a special promotional chopping board issued to launch the album. The band toured the new record extensively both in Europe and North America, as well as embarking on their first ever tour of Australia in summer 2014. In 2015, Bell X1 supported Ed Sheeran on both nights at massive Croke Park Shows in Dublin.

=== Arms ===
"It was the most difficult album we've made... There was a touch of 'What the Jaysus do we do now?!', and it led to a lot of soul searching about what kind of band we are, what we have to say, what is the core, the soul of the band. It took a while to find that voice on this record. We needed to unlearn a few things."

— – Paul Noonan on the making of Arms, Bowers & Wilkins

While Chop Chop took two weeks to record, making a follow-up record would take two years. In late 2014/early 2015, the band assembled in Geraghty's home studio once more to write and demo new material before relocating to the Donegal studio of producer Tommy McLaughlin (Villagers, Soak) to record. The trio, however, were not satisfied with the overall shape of the record and road testing the material on live dates revealed that some tracks needed to be re-approached. The original release date of summer 2015 was scrapped.

Seeking to make something "looser" in structure and more "unhinged" to their previous records, the band chose not to record to a click track for a lot of the songs, believing that the irregular tempos and imperfections would have more resonance with listeners.

It would be 14 October 2016 before Arms, Bell X1’s seventh album, would be released and enter the Irish album charts at No.2. The album received universal acclaim and holds a Metascore of 81/100 on the music aggregate site Metacritic. Talia Schlangar of NPR called the record "bright, thoughtful and gracefully rough around the edges…". Mojo said Arms was "a humane and typically eclectic affair with winning flashes of eccentricity". The Grammy-nominated singer-songwriter Hozier, meanwhile, described lead single "The Upswing" as "new beautiful greatness".

Some commentators picked up on a sense of solace and ease in Noonan's lyrics, with Brynn Davies of The Music commenting that the album was "elegantly melancholy, reflecting the determination, optimism and bittersweet musings of a band finding wisdom in the next stages of their lives and careers". In its review of the album, Hot Press magazine noted that "The Upswing" (released as single four months ahead of Arms) was "Bell X1 at their melancholic moodiest, but still optimistic and hopeful", while "I'll Go Where You Go" was addressing the concerns of being a touring musician and parent at the same time.

The band returned to Australia in December 2016 for a three-date mini-tour before bringing Arms to the US for a string of live shows in February 2017. Following a headline outdoor show in Dublin's Trinity College in July, the band embarked on a 20-date European tour supporting Tori Amos.

== 20th Anniversary shows ==
In 2018, Bell X1 played a series of gigs marking their 20th anniversary across Ireland. This included a five-night residency in Dublin's Vicar Street 21–25 March 2018, with the first three nights featuring a classic album played in full – Neither Am I, Music In Mouth and Flock – and the final two comprising a greatest hits set and an acoustic evening, respectively. All five nights quickly sold out. There were also greatest hits shows in both King John's Castle, Limerick in May and Live At The Marquee, Cork in June of the same year.

In August 2018, the band concluded their "Bandiversary year" with two shows at Dublin's National Concert Hall on 28 and 29 November. The shows featured string accompaniment from Dowry Strings (Éna Brennan), with whom Bell X1 had performed earlier in the year at an event in aid of Aware.

In 2019, they played two January dates in the band's beloved Union Chapel in London, one of which sold out immediately. Following this, the group embarked on a nine-date February tour of Ireland which, like the November shows, would be "Acoustic-ish" performances with Dowry Strings again providing accompaniment.

They played a headline outdoor show at King John's Castle in July 2019 in the full-band format, as well as a major date at the Galway Arts Festival.

The Acoustic-ish with Dowry Strings Tour 2020 dates were released in November 2019 for the following summer across Ireland and the UK but were postponed due to COVID-19. In May 2020, Bell X1 announced the rescheduled tour dates from January 2021 for the gigs on their official website.

== Lyrics and style ==
Noonan's lyrical style has been described as being confessional, occasionally bemusing, and incorporating aphorisms and colloquialisms. Thematically, he is known to cover a wide variety of subject matter. The unconventional nature of Noonan's lyrics is regarded as a signature feature of Bell X1's music. Noonan has also said in the past that most Bell X1 songs are lyrically driven during development stage rather than musically driven. Although the group has never categorised themselves as "Irish rock", lyrically Noonan has often woven in elements from everyday Irish life into songs, from the changing economic fortunes of Ireland during the Celtic Tiger era to the subsequent recession.

Noonan has also expressed a growing interest in prose writing. The singer revealed that he has written some short stories. He has described himself as a big fan of the Irish writer John McGahern.

The BBC has described Bell X1's music as "remarkably warm — as if imported from the Caribbean via Dublin City".

== Side projects and solo work ==
David Geraghty has released two solo albums under his own name. His solo debut, Kill Your Darlings, was nominated for the 2007 Choice Music Prize for Album of the Year. More recently, Geraghty has composed music for film and television, including the Oscar-nominated short The Crush, and You're Ugly Too, which was selected for the 2015 Berlinale. He has a website for this film score work here. davidgeraghtymusic.

Since 2014, David has been releasing music under the Moniker Join Me in the Pines. 2014 saw the release of "Inherit" and in 2019 "Monomania" was released.

Over the years, Paul Noonan has appeared on a number of side projects and as a guest musician (usually percussion and vocals) for fellow artists such as Cathy Davey and Gemma Hayes. Since 2011, Noonan has curated a solo project called Printer Clips which took the form of collaborations on original material with a range of female artists. In May 2014, a self-titled debut album was released featuring collaborations with Joan As Policewoman, Martha Wainwright, Gemma Hayes, Amy Millan, Julia Stone, Lisa Hannigan, Danielle Harrison, Cathy Davey, Maria Doyle Kennedy and fiddler Caoimhín Ó Raghallaigh. In July 2017, Noonan announced solo dates across Ireland performing new material as well as songs from Bell X1 and Printer Clips.

The band and individual members have been involved in several charitable endeavours, including the recording of The Cake Sale, a collaborative compilation spearheaded by former Bell X1 founding member Brian Crosby. David Geraghty wrote the opening track "Last Leaf", which was sung by Lisa Hannigan. This song also features on Geraghty's debut solo album but under the title "Long Time Running". Another song from the Cake Sale – "Some Surprise", features Noonan and Lisa Hannigan – and it appeared on an episode of Grey's Anatomy in November 2007.

Bell X1 also contributed a track called "No Retreat, No Surrender" to the Sparks n' Mind charity compilation in aid of the Irish group Aware.

== Members ==
=== Current ===
- Paul Noonan – vocals; guitar; drums; percussion; kazoo
- David Geraghty – vocals: guitar; drums: banjo; piano; keyboards: harmonica
- Dominic Philips – bass guitar; vocals

==== Live ====
- Bill Blackmore – horns
- Marc Aubele – guitar; keyboards (2008–present)
- Rory Doyle – drums (2008–present)
- Glenn Keating – keyboards (2014–present)

=== Former ===
- Brian Crosby – guitar; keyboards; vocals (1999–2008)
- Tim O'Donovan – drums

== Discography ==
- Neither Am I (2000)
- Music in Mouth (2003)
- Flock (2005)
- Tour De Flock (2007)
- Blue Lights on the Runway (2009)
- Bloodless Coup (2011)
- Field Recordings (2012)
- Chop Chop (2013)
- Arms (2016)
- Merciful Hour (2023)
- Good Bones (2026)

== Awards ==
=== Choice Music Prize ===
Bell X1's third album Flock was nominated for the 2005 Choice Music Prize. Although considered the favourite, it did not emerge as the winner on the night, with Julie Feeney's 13 Songs taking the award.

Fourth album Blue Lights on the Runway was nominated for the 2009 Choice Music Prize. It lost out to The Season of the Sparks by Irish singer-songwriter Adrian Crowley.

Bloodless Coup, Bell X1's fifth LP, was nominated for the 2011 prize, but was a runner-up to Ocean of Frequency by Jape.

"Chop Chop" was nominated for the 2013 Choice Music Prize, the eventual prize for Album of the Year going to Villagers for Awayland. Villagers were a support act for Bell X1 on their 2009 UK tour.

Year	Nominee / work	Award	Result
2006	Flock	Irish Album of the Year 2005	Nominated
2010	Blue Lights on the Runway	Irish Album of the Year 2009	Nominated
2012	Bloodless Coup	Irish Album of the Year 2011	Nominated
2014	Chop Chop	Irish Album of the Year 2013	Nominated

=== Meteor Music Awards ===
Bell X1 have been nominated for several Meteor Music Awards. They were nominated in the Best Irish Band category and Music in Mouth was nominated in the Best Irish Album category at the 2004 Meteor Awards. They were again nominated in the Best Irish Band category at the 2005 Meteor Awards.

They were nominated in three categories at the 2010 Meteor Awards: Best Irish Album, Best Irish Band and Best Irish Live Performance.

In addition, the band have performed at the 2005 Meteor Awards on 24 February 2005 and at the 2006 Meteor Awards on 2 February 2006.

Year	Nominee / work	Award	Result
2004	Music in Mouth	Best Irish Album	Nominated
2004	Bell X1	Best Irish Band	Nominated
2005	Bell X1	Best Irish Band	Nominated
2010	Blue Lights on the Runway	Best Irish Album	Nominated
2010	Bell X1	Best Irish Band	Nominated
2010	Bell X1	Best Irish Live Performance	Nominated
