= David Geraghty =

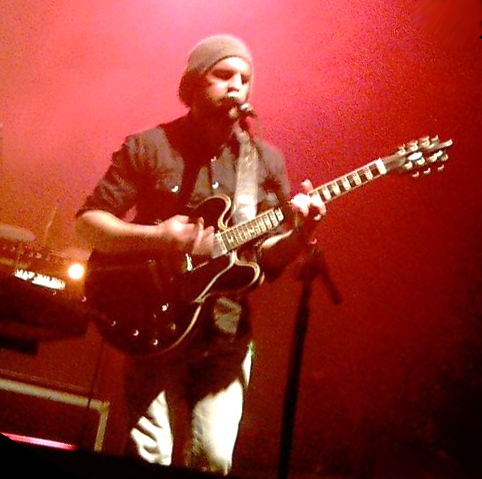
- Geraghty performing in the Olympia Theatre, Dublin, 2009.

Background information
- Born: 30 September 1975 (age 50); Leixlip, County Kildare, Ireland
- Genre: Alternative rock
- Occupations: Singer, songwriter, composer
- Instruments: Vocals, guitar, drum, banjo, harmonica, piano
- Labels: BellyUp Records; Decal Records
- Website: davidgeraghtymusic.com

David Geraghty (born 30 September 1975) is an Irish multi-instrumentalist, composer and songwriter. He is a founding member of Bell X1, released solo albums, and between 2014 and 2021 was performing under the moniker Join Me in the Pines.

In 1994 he joined the group Juniper along with Paul Noonan, Damien Rice, Dominic Phillips and Brian Crosby. Damien Rice left Juniper in 1998 to pursue a solo career, and the remaining members reformed as Bell X1, named after the Bell X-1.

Geraghty released his debut solo album Kill Your Darlings on 7 September 2007, while still a member of Bell X1. His debut earned him a nomination for the Choice Music Prize and two Meteor award nominations (Best Album and Best Male). Following the album's release Geraghty went on a nationwide tour of Ireland.

His second solo album The Victory Dance was released in 2009, coinciding with a nationwide tour which began with a live performance at Electric Picnic in Stradbally, County Laois. The first single from the album was "Tuesday's Feet." The second single from the album is "The Emperor's Hand–Me-Downs," released in Ireland on 30 October 2009.

As "Join Me in the Pines", Geraghty released the albums INHERIT in 2014 and MONOMANIA in 2019.

In 2026, Geraghty released the solo album Komorebi under his own name.
