= Oxegen 2005 =

Music festival in Ireland

- Genre: Rock
- Dates: 9–10 July 2005
- Locations: Punchestown Racecourse, County Kildare, Ireland
- Previous event: Oxegen 2004
- Next event: Oxegen 2006
- Attendance: 70,000
- Website: www.OXEGEN.ie

Oxegen 2005 was the second Oxegen festival to take place, following the dissolution of its predecessor Witnness in 2004. It took place on the weekend of Saturday 9 and Sunday 10 July at Punchestown Racecourse near Naas in County Kildare, Ireland.

70,000 attended the festival, with 60,000 camping for the weekend. The headliners were Foo Fighters on the Sunday and Green Day on the Saturday.

== Tickets ==
A limited number of tickets went on sale in December 2004 at a discount price and quickly sold out, the main bulk of tickets went on sale on Friday 18 February, costing €150 for the weekend with a camping pass, €125 for the weekend without a camping pass and €67 for a day pass for either day. The tickets sold out in record time on 3 June, six weeks prior to the event. Promoter Denis Desmond was chuffed:

"For Oxegen to sell out so far in advance in its short history is an incredible achievement. It goes to show that the event has already established itself as one of the most important events in the Irish music calendar."

== Festival ==
=== Performances ===
There were five stages on which over eighty acts performed during the course of the two-day event. Sunday night headliners Foo Fighters, as well as Ian Brown, The Prodigy, The Frames, Keane, and The Killers were some of the first acts to be announced for the festival. Also playing were Saturday night headliners Green Day, New Order, James Brown, Queens of the Stone Age, Feeder, Kasabian, Nine Black Alps, The Departure, Razorlight, LCD Soundsystem, Echo & the Bunnymen, The La's, The Revs, Snoop Dogg and The Futureheads are some of the acts that performed at the festival.

Kaiser Chiefs made their Oxegen debut on the Main Stage.

Kaiser Chiefs made their Oxegen debut as the third act on the Main Stage on the Saturday, a feat they would surpass on the Sunday of the following year when they were third headliners. They later went on to become second headliners on the Sunday of the 2008 festival. Other bands to make their Oxegen debut included Bloc Party, The Bravery and Rodrigo y Gabriela. Bloc Party frontman Kele Okereke received a cold reception from the crowd after saying that it was great to be "back in the UK" before trying to back out of it by saying that he meant "familiar territory".

Audioslave played on the Main Stage on the Sunday of Oxegen 2005, their only Irish festival performance before their split in 2007. They performed much of their own material and also previous songs by Soundgarden ("Spoonman" and "Black Hole Sun") and Rage Against the Machine ("Killing in the Name"). The band minus Chris Cornell went on to headline Oxegen 2008 with Zack de la Rocha as the reformed Rage Against the Machine, with "Killing in the Name" performed in its original style.

The scheduled appearance of Bright Eyes in the Green Room on the Saturday was cancelled at the last minute; they were replaced on the bill by Irish band 66e who were asked to step in on that same afternoon. Bright Eyes did however later go on to make an appearance on the Pet Sounds Stage on the Sunday of the 2007 festival. Ian Brown headlined the Green Room on the Saturday of Oxegen 2005 before going on to repeat this on the Sunday of Oxegen 2008. Flogging Molly performed in the Green Room on the Saturday of Oxegen 2005 before oddly going on to perform on the New Band Stage on the Sunday of Oxegen 2008.

The Magic Numbers, Future Kings of Spain, The Go! Team, Humanzi, Director and The Blizzards were amongst the bands that performed on the New Band Stage. Editors too performed on the New Band Stage, making the first of what, as of 2008, was four consecutive appearances on four different stages at Oxegen. They performed on the NME Stage in 2006, the Green Room in 2007 and the Main Stage in 2008.

=== Transport ===
Dublin Bus operated a shuttle service to Punchestown from Parnell Square West with buses departing every 20 minutes.

=== Health ===
The Order of Malta had 70 personnel and ambulance crews on site to deal with any problems in the arena over the weekend, while Civil Defence provided over 120 personnel and emergency vehicles for the campsite. However, the hot weather on Sunday did result in a dose of severe sunstroke for some revellers.

=== Crime ===
Dozens of gardaí, drug enforcement officers, sniffer dogs and security officers policed the grounds. There was no serious trouble with fewer than 100 arrests for drug offences, generally for possession of cannabis.

== Awards ==
Oxegen was voted fifth best British or Irish music festival of 2005 in an NME poll of 10,000 people. It was placed below Glastonbury, Reading, Live 8 and V Festival. Oxegen headliners Foo Fighters were also voted best band in the same poll.

== Broadcasting rights ==
MTV broadcast the festival across Europe.

== 2005 Line-up ==
The main acts that played the festival:

Saturday 9 July

Oxegen Stage

- Green Day
- The Frames
- Queens of the Stone Age
- Snoop Dogg
- Razorlight
- Kaiser Chiefs
- The Saw Doctors
- The Stands

Ticket Stage

- The Prodigy
- Kasabian
- Bloc Party
- The Bravery
- Echo & the Bunnymen
- Kerbdog
- Eagles of Death Metal
- Nine Black Alps
- The Departure
- Angels of Mons
- The Marshall Stars

Green Room

- Ian Brown
- Interpol
- Athlete
- ~~Bright Eyes~~*
- 66e
- KT Tunstall
- HAL
- Stephen Fretwell
- Biffy Clyro
- Flogging Molly
- Countermine

New Band Stage

- The Tears
- The Go! Team
- Future Kings of Spain
- The Dears
- yourcodenameis:milo
- Joe Chester
- Engineers
- The Black Velvets
- Blue Van
- Mainline
- Red Organ Serpent
- The 747s
- Director
- The Gurriers

Dance Stage

- Erick Morillo
- Mylo
- Two Lone Swordsmen
- Slam
- Blackstrobe
- A Gibbs / Hugh Scully / P Taylor / Ivano / S McNaughton
- Johnny Moy
- Fish Go Deep & Tracey K
- Conor G
- Brother J

The Oxegen 2005 Poster

Sunday 10 July

Oxegen Stage

- Foo Fighters
- Keane
- Kaiser Chiefs
- The Killers
- The Streets
- Audioslave
- Feeder
- The Beautiful South
- The Revs

Ticket Stage

- New Order
- Doves
- Josh Ritter
- Jimmy Eat World
- Mundy
- The Ordinary Boys
- Rooster
- Maxïmo Park
- Fightstar

Green Room

- James Brown
- Rodrigo y Gabriela
- Embrace
- The La's
- The Futureheads
- Alabama 3
- Suzanne Vega
- Josh Rouse
- Rilo Kiley
- Bronagh Gallagher
- The Perishers

New Band Stage

- Super Furry Animals
- Brendan Benson
- The Magic Numbers
- Death from Above 1979
- Editors
- Tom Vek
- Humanzi
- The Longcut
- Jackson United
- Leaves
- The Blizzards
- Blind Friday
- Tony Fitzpatrick

Dance Stage

- Deep Dish
- LCD Soundsystem
- Jacques Lu Cont
- Death in Vegas
- Silicone Soul
- Infadels
- Nic Fanciulli
- Brother J

_{* denotes cancelled performance}

Preceded by Oxegen 2004	Oxegen; 2005	Succeeded by Oxegen 2006
