= 2005 in Irish music =

This is an, as yet, incomplete summary of the year 2005 in the Irish music industry.

== Summary ==
=== January ===
- On 4 January Ian Brown was confirmed for Oxegen 2005.

=== February ===
- On 8 February The Killers were confirmed for Oxegen 2005.
- On 10 February Keane were confirmed for Oxegen 2005.
- At the 2005 Grammy Awards in Los Angeles on 13 February, U2's critically acclaimed international hit single "Vertigo" won three awards: "Best Rock Song", "Best Rock Performance by a Duo or Group with Vocal" and "Best Short Form Music Video".
- On 14 February The Frames were confirmed for Oxegen 2005.

=== March ===
- On 3 March Green Day were confirmed as Saturday night headliners of Oxegen 2005.
- On 4 March tickets for Oxegen 2005 went on sale as an appearance by Queens of the Stone Age was officially confirmed for the festival.

=== June ===
- On 11 June Neil Diamond played a sold-out show at Lansdowne Road.
- On 22 June Coldplay played to a crowd of 20,000 at Marlay Park in Dublin. They were supported by Morning Runner and Interpol.
- 2005 saw U2 bringing their Vertigo Tour to Croke Park in Dublin for three dates in the summer (24, 25 and 27 June) following the release of the band's long-awaited eleventh studio album, How to Dismantle an Atomic Bomb the previous year. U2 broke Irish box office marks with ticket sales for these Croke Park concerts, after more than 240,000 tickets were sold in record time.

=== July ===
- July marked the 20th anniversary of Live Aid, an event which Bob Geldof had played a significant role in organising. In an attempt to highlight the growing need to cancel Third World debt, Geldof, Bono, Elton John and many others in the music industry campaigned for justice in the build-up to the G8 Conference and Summit in Scotland, leading to the organisation of Live 8 on 2 July. The event, which was only announced by Geldof on 30 May was on a much larger scale than Live Aid, with 10 simultaneous concerts in 9 different countries broadcast live around the world. However, unlike its predecessor, its main aim was to highlight inequalities as opposed to raising money. U2 opened the Hyde Park concert with their rendition of "Sgt. Pepper's Lonely Hearts Club Band" alongside Paul McCartney. Snow Patrol performed later.
- Oasis played a sold-out show in Marlay Park, Dublin on Saturday 16 or Sunday 17 July .

=== August ===
- Bud Rising came to Ireland for the first time in August 2005. The Chemical Brothers and Sonic Youth, supported by Mainline, played Marlay Park on 19 August, whilst Basement Jaxx, Underworld and Mylo played the same venue the following day. Pixies and Kings of Leon played Lansdowne Road on 23 August, whilst Scissor Sisters, Franz Ferdinand and Maroon 5 played the same venue the following day.
- Arcade Fire were the surprise act at the newly expanded two-day Electric Picnic.

== Bands formed ==
- Delorentos
- Director
- Envelope
- Ham Sandwich
- Humanzi
- The Kinetiks (Late 2005)
- Red Organ Serpent Sound
- The Spikes
- Super Extra Bonus Party

== Bands disbanded ==
- Rubyhorse

== Bands reformed ==
- Kerbdog
- The Sultans of Ping FC
- Whipping Boy

== Albums & EPs ==
Below is a list of notable albums & EPs released by Irish artists in Ireland in 2005.

- New Dawn Breaking – The Walls (June 2005)
- Check In – The Chalets (2 September 2005)
- Face to Face – Westlife (31 October 2005)
- Leave It On – Delorentos (October 2005) – EP
- Triega – Triega (11 March 2005) – (EP)
- Turn LP – Turn (23 September 2005) – (EP)
- Flock – Bell X1 (14 October 2005) Bell X1 - Flock
- The World Should Know – Dave Couse/Couse and the Impossible (31 October 2005)
- The Roads Don't Love You – Gemma Hayes (31 October 2005)
- Rubicon – The Duggans & Friends

== Singles ==
Below is a list of notable singles released by Irish artists in Ireland in 2005.

Issue date	Song title	Artist	Source	Sales	Notes
28 January	"Sideways Down"	The Frames			
7 February	"Sometimes You Can't Make It on Your Own"	U2			
6 June	"City of Blinding Lights"	U2			
17 June	"Unplayed Piano"	Damien Rice feat. Lisa Hannigan			
__ June	"She's Gone"	JJ72			
__ August	"Coming Home"	JJ72			
30 September	"Bigger Than Me"	Bell X1			
11 October	"All Because of You"	U2			
24 October	"Freewheel"	Duke Special			
24 October	"You Raise Me Up"	Westlife			
__ November	"Original of the Species"	U2			
7 November	"Fix The Cracks"	Humanzi			

Date unknown

- "Happy Sad" – Gemma Hayes (??? 2005)
- "All Is Violent, All Is Bright" – God Is an Astronaut (??? 2005)
- "Feel the Machine" – The Chalets (??? 2005)
- "No Style" – The Chalets (??? 2005)
- "The Irish Keep Gate-crashing" – The Thrills (??? 2005)

== Festivals ==
=== Oxegen 2005 ===
- Oxegen 2005 took place at Punchestown Racecourse in County Kildare on Saturday 9 and Sunday 10 July. It was headlined by Green Day, Foo Fighters, New Order, James Brown, The Prodigy, Queens of the Stone Age and The Frames.

=== Electric Picnic 2006 ===
- Electric Picnic 2005 took place in Stradbally Estate, County Laois. It was headlined by Kraftwerk, The Flaming Lips, Nick Cave and the Bad Seeds, The Human League, Röyksopp, Mercury Rev, Fatboy Slim and Arcade Fire.

=== Heineken Green Energy ===
- Heineken Green Energy took place for the 10th year in 2005, featuring Beck and Paddy Casey.

=== Bud Rising ===
- Bud Rising Summer Shows took place in Ireland for the first time in 2005. The gigs took place over four days in two different venues; Marlay Park and Lansdowne Road. Chemical Brothers played Marlay Park on 19 August, whilst Basement Jaxx, Underworld and Mylo played the same venue the following day. Pixies and Kings of Leon played Lansdowne Road on 23 August, whilst Scissor Sisters, Franz Ferdinand and Maroon 5 played the same venue the following day.

=== Live at the Marquee ===
- Live at the Marquee 2005 took place in the Cork Showgrounds between 30 June and 17 July. Headlining acts included Brian Wilson, Aslan, Diana Ross, Al Green, Nick Cave, Tommy Tiernan, Damien Dempsey and Christy Moore.

=== Slane 2006 ===
- Slane 2005 was cancelled following the failure of headline act Eminem to co-operate with the organisers. His support act was due to have been 50 Cent.

== Music awards ==
=== 2005 Meteor Awards ===
The 2005 Meteor Awards were held on ???, 2005. Below are the winners:

Award	Winner(s)
Best Irish Male	Paddy Casey
Best Irish Female	Juliet Turner
Best Irish Band	Snow Patrol
Best Irish Album	Final Straw (Snow Patrol)
Best New Irish Act	The Chalets
Best Irish Pop Act	Westlife
Best Live Performance	The Killers (Oxegen 2004???)
Best Irish DJ	Ray D'Arcy
Hope for 2005	Angel of Mons
Best Folk/Traditional	Planxty
Best International Male	Morrissey
Best International Female	PJ Harvey
Best International Band	Franz Ferdinand
Best International Album	?
Industry Award	John Hughes
Lifetime Achievement Award	Aslan
Humanitarian Award	Adi Roche

=== Choice Music Prize ===
The Choice Music Prize did not exist this year.

== See also ==
- 2005 in Swiss music
