= Oxegen 2006 =

Music festival in Ireland

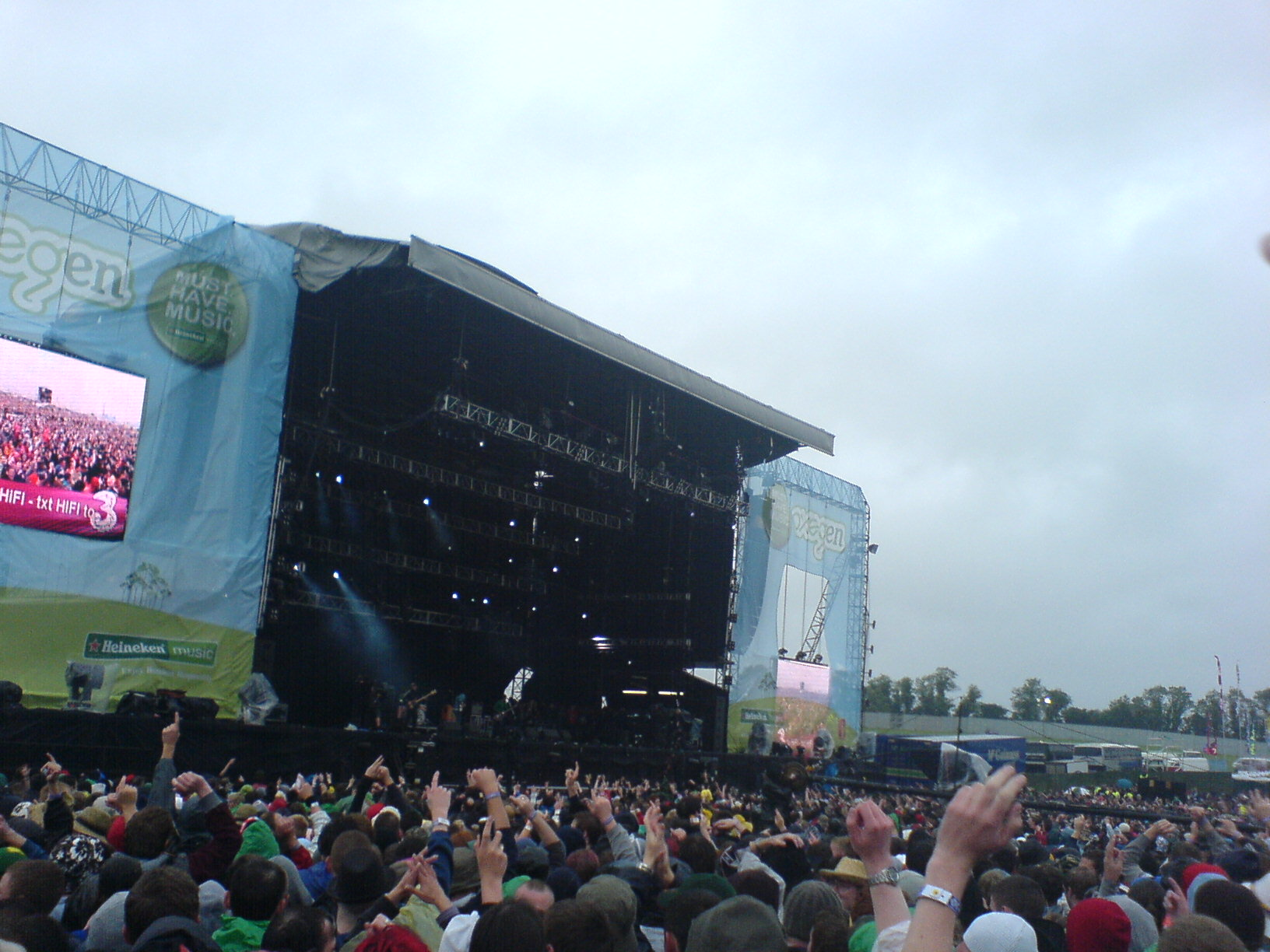
- The Main Stage on the Saturday at Oxegen 2006.
- Genre: Rock
- Dates: 8–9 July 2006
- Locations: Punchestown Racecourse, County Kildare, Ireland
- Previous event: Oxegen 2005
- Next event: Oxegen 2007
- Attendance: 80,000
- Website: www.oxegen.ie

Oxegen 2006 was the third Oxegen festival to take place, following the dissolution of its predecessor Witnness in 2004. It took place on the weekend of Saturday, 8 July and Sunday, 9 July at Punchestown Racecourse near Naas in County Kildare, Ireland. The festival was headlined by Red Hot Chili Peppers on the Sunday and The Who on the Saturday.

== Build-up ==
=== Tickets ===
A limited number of tickets for the 2006 festival went on sale a week after the 2005 festival on Friday, 15 July. Following a one-week presale in late February, tickets went on sale to the general public on Friday 3 March 2006 at 8 am Weekend camping tickets were priced at €160. This allocation of tickets was completely sold out within 48 hours, leaving many fans disappointed. Growing popularity among younger audiences, massive MTV (UK and Ireland) coverage of the festival, and tickets being on sale for a much longer length of time were said to have been some of the reasons for the festival selling out earlier than usual. A small number of tickets went on sale on 4 July 2006 but quickly sold out.

=== Confirmed acts ===
On Monday 20 February, Oxegen 2006 was launched and the first acts (including headliners The Who and Red Hot Chili Peppers, as well as Jester, The Strokes, Arctic Monkeys, Franz Ferdinand and Kaiser Chiefs) were officially announced. On Friday 24 February, Placebo and Timo Maas were added to the line-up. On Tuesday 28 February, Paul Weller and The Charlatans were announced alongside Pharrell, Editors, Clap Your Hands Say Yeah, The Go! Team, Eels and The Kooks. On Thursday 2 March, Goldfrapp, Ben Harper, Hard-Fi and Damien Dempsey were officially confirmed for Oxegen. Also performing were Republic of Loose, Bell X1, Director, The Marshals and The Blizzards.

== Festival ==
=== New additions ===
- Hot showers were made available for the first time.

=== Weather ===
The festival itself encountered bad weather which eclipsed previous records. However, following rain, strong wind, a low temperature, and general stormy conditions on the Saturday, the weather improved on Sunday afternoon with sunny skies and a cool, gentle breeze ensuring a decrease in wet festival-goers.

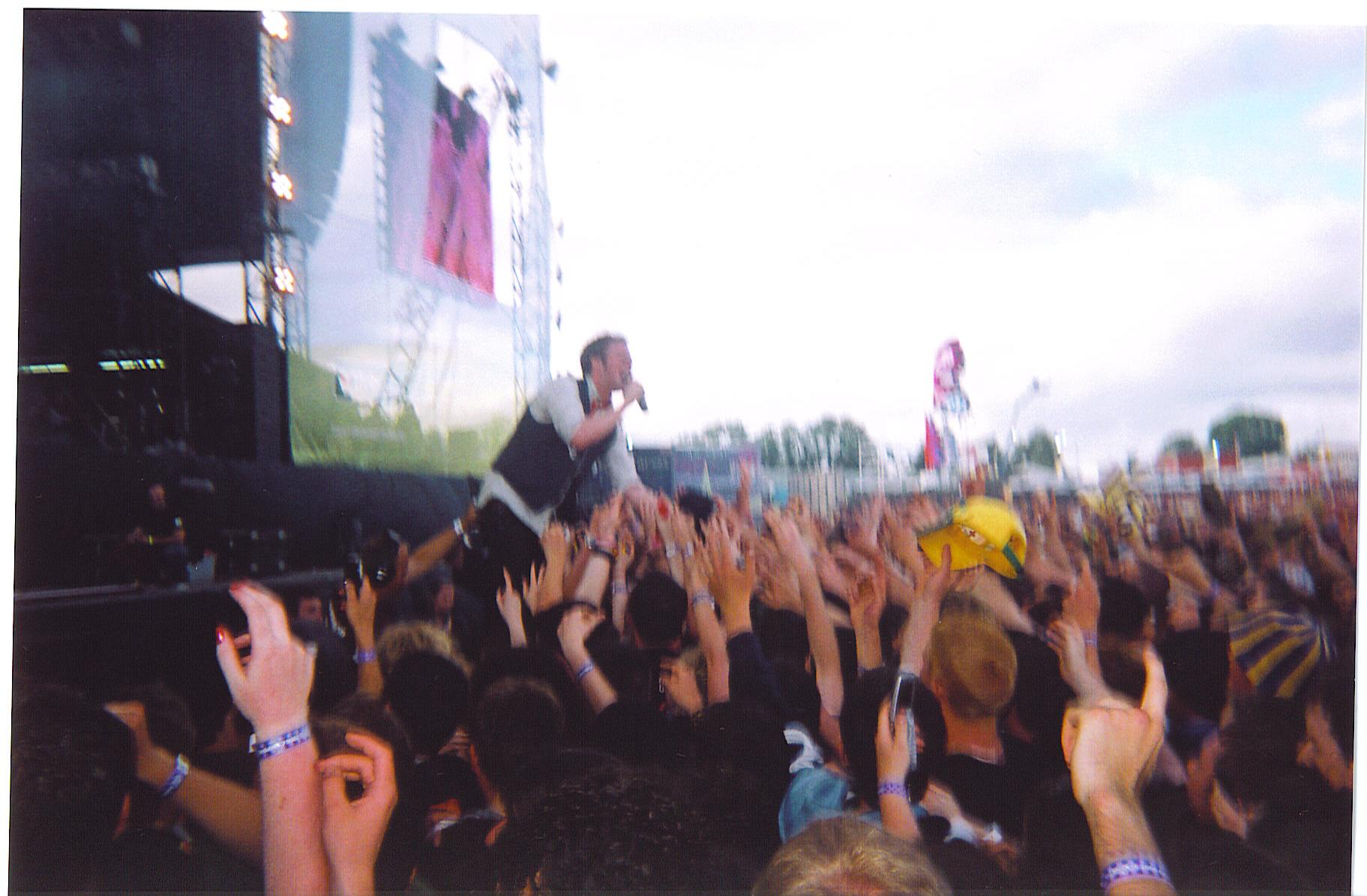
Kaiser Chiefs frontman Ricky Wilson climbs into the crowd at the 2006 Oxegen festival.

=== Stages and performances ===
In the 2006 festival, The Ticket Stage was re-branded as the NME Stage, MTV sponsored the Dance Arena instead of the Main Stage, and the Pet Sounds Stage was added to the festival. The Pet Sounds stage was on the Saturday night unexpectedly headlined by Kasabian who had remained unannounced as an official act in the lead up to the festival. The New Band Stage, Green Room and Bacardi B-Live Arena all returned. The Green Room increased in size, while the Dance Arena was moved to an indoor venue. The MTV/VH1 live tent, located backstage at the 2005 festival was moved into the main festival area. Amongst the bands and artists that performed on the New Band Stage were The Fratellis, The Automatic, Humanzi, Lily Allen, Paolo Nutini and Boy Kill Boy.

On the Saturday night, The Who headlined the Main Stage, performing live in Ireland for the first time in 35 years. They delivered a rousing set that included hits "My Generation", "Baba O'Riley" and "Won't Get Fooled Again". After The Who had completed their show, James Brown took to the Main Stage in what turned out to be his last ever live performance at a festival in Ireland. Earlier in the evening, The Strokes lit up the Main Stage with a series of flashy lights, with festival-goers running to the Main Stage to witness their powerful set. More danced down to the Main Stage later on as the first riffs of "Last Nite" were ejaculated into the night sky. The weather caused numerous sound problems on the Saturday, noticeably at HARD-Fi's set in particular; the band were followed late in the afternoon by the arrival of Arctic Monkeys to a live Irish audience.

The NME Stage was headlined by Richard Ashcroft who would return two years later with his band The Verve to bring the Main Stage to a close on the Saturday night of Oxegen 2008. Before that Editors made the most of their promotion from their New Band Stage status of the previous year to deliver a performance that included songs from their debut album The Back Room - "Blood", "Munich", "All Sparks", "Bullets" - as well as a debut Oxegen performance for new song "Bones" which featured on their second album An End Has a Start and opened their Main Stage set on the Friday night of Oxegen 2008. Earlier in the night, as The Strokes performed on the Main Stage, Feeder were on the NME Stage, with hit "Buck Rogers" a central part of their performance, before the usual set finisher "Just a Day".

On the Sunday, The Kooks performed on an NME Stage which was clearly too small for them and their large army of fans; for the 2007 and 2008 festivals they were promoted to the Main Stage. When Franz Ferdinand had completed their Main Stage set on the Sunday evening, the action on the large screens at either side of the stage switched to BBC One where the World Cup Final had gone down to a penalty shootout. A chorus of cheers and boos were to be heard from the crowd as the game finished off. The drama was followed by a headlining performance from Red Hot Chili Peppers who performed in Ireland for the fourth time in five summers. They opened their set with "Can't Stop", "Dani California", "Scar Tissue" and "Charlie" before finishing off the night with "By the Way", "Under the Bridge" and "Give It Away".

=== Backstage ===
- Kaiser Chiefs and Kasabian had to be kept apart by security at Oxegen 2006 when Kasabian singer Tom Meighan threatened to smack Ricky Wilson after his group branded Kasabian "sh**" in an interview. Meighan fumed:
  "The next time I see Ricky I'm going to punch him in the face. I can't believe the Kaiser Chiefs dissed us - they are ones to talk."
- The Daily Mirror reported that The Who needed to produce ID to get back stage at Oxegen 2006. Roger Daltrey and the rest of the band were not recognised by security;
  "One guard even thought they were just old groupies of the Arctic Monkeys."
- Members of Dirty Pretty Things were reported to have attacked MTV presenter Zane Lowe when he tried to stop them smoking backstage at Oxegen 2006.
  "The band were on a bender and lit up in a no-smoking area. When Zane asked them to stop, guitarist Dids punched him and the others joined in."
  An MTV spokesman said:
  "Luckily Zane was OK and didn't make a fuss about it."
  This was proved to be an incorrect report as proved in the MTV footage.

=== Celebrities ===
Celebrities spotted at Oxegen 2006 included actress Patsy Kensit with Killa Kela in the MTV tent.

=== Film exhibition ===
International short film label Future Shorts Ireland attended Oxegen 2006 as part of their summer tour of Irish festivals, which also included the Electric Picnic. Working in partnership with Kaleidoscope Productions, they presented a line-up of acclaimed international short films alongside up and coming Irish directors and provided a performance platform for innovative and experimental musicians.

=== Pension recruitment ===
The Irish Times reported that representatives from the Pensions Board were to attend Oxegen 2006 in a bid to convince more young people to start saving for retirement. They also targeted thousands of gig-goers heading to the Electric Picnic music festival.

=== Controversy ===
Security arrangements at Oxegen were criticised as being poor by some sections of the media. The camp-site was not free from trouble in 2006 troublesome, with some reports of tent-burning and an alleged stabbing on the Sunday night/Monday morning of the festival. In the Green Room there was seen to be a considerable leak allowing rain into the enclosed tent.

There were 225 arrests for drugs (with 13 charged for possession with intent to supply), an alleged rape, and the Evening Herald reported that around 250 people were treated for alcohol and drug abuse. Fears were raised of a bad batch of the drug ecstasy when 40 people were sent to Naas General Hospital, but no evidence of such a batch was found.

At present, the previously lively official forum remains shut down, presumably as a result of postings on the message board which would generate negative publicity for the event. As internet users reported on the event at boards.ie, Ireland's largest web-based discussion forum, MCD pressed for legal action to prevent such postings from surfacing.

== Aftermath ==
=== Deaths ===
Three people were killed in a road accident in Portlaoise, County Laois whilst returning from Oxegen 2006. The accident occurred on the N8 at Clonad on the Portlaoise to Abbeyleix road at 2.45 pm on Monday 10 July. Gardaí said that two males and one female were killed when the car in which they were travelling was in collision with a lorry. Another male who was in the car is said to have been seriously injured. He has been taken to Portlaoise General Hospital. The dead were later named as Paul Geary, 21, from Mitchelstown, Thomas Frewen, 22, from Kilworth, and his sister Mary Frewen, 19.

=== Boards.ie sued by MCD ===
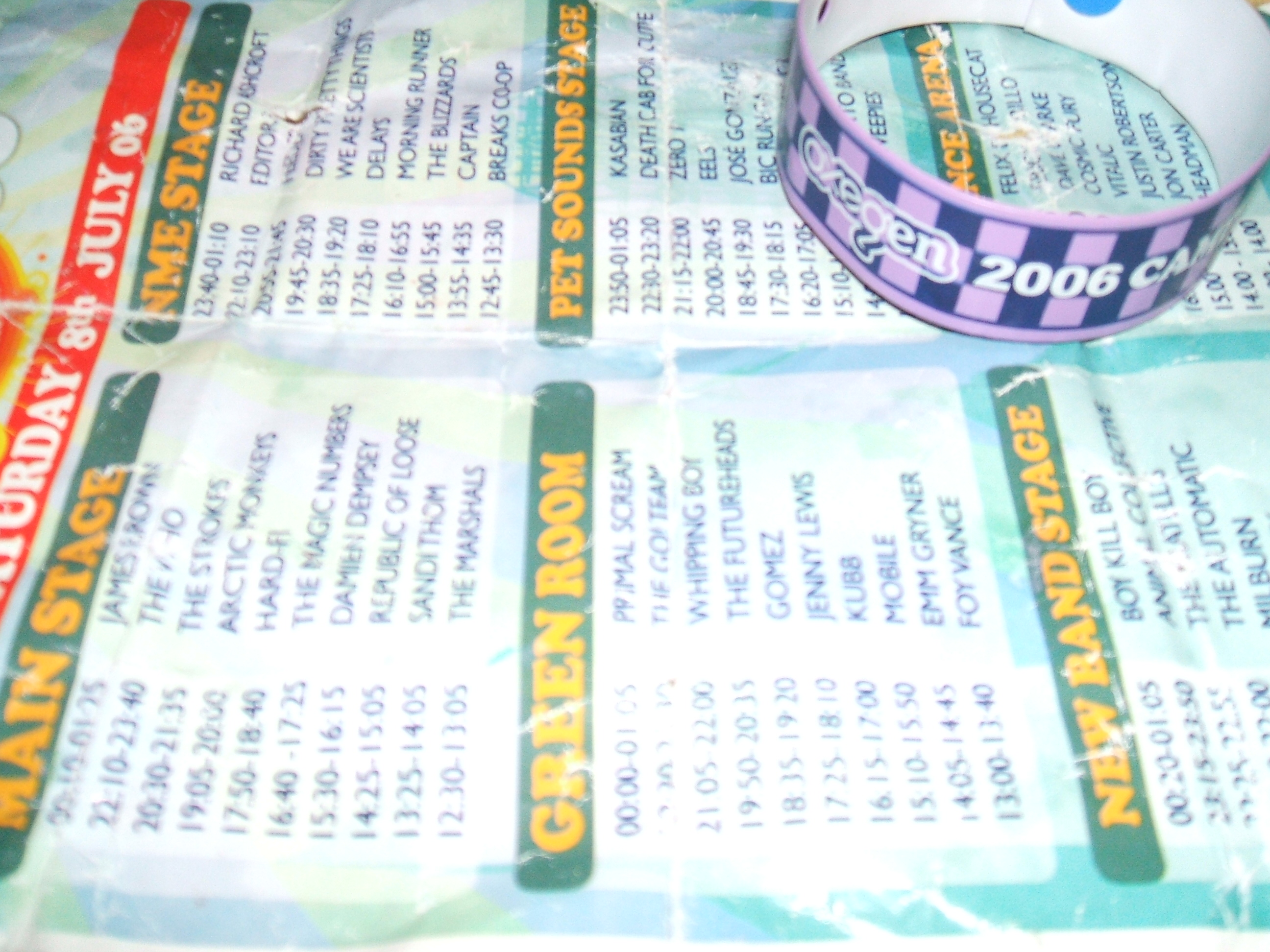
Festival programme and campsite wristband from Oxegen 2006

In response to negative postings about the festival on boards.ie, MCD sent a letter via their solicitors to the administrators of the site threatening legal action. As a result, the administrators were forced to ban all discussion of MCD and related events. As of Friday 11 August 2006, MCD had entered into legal proceedings against boards.ie for comments regarding Oxegen on their discussion forums. Mention of any MCD event - including any of its stage concerts throughout the country - continues to be banned on boards.i.e. Discussion of its venues, The Ambassador and The Olympia, is also prohibited.

The Irish Independent were also threatened with legal action on their coverage of the Oxegen festival. Justin Green of MCD told the paper: "We must warn you that in the event that an article critical of the event is published, we will take whatever action is necessary to prevent damage to the Oxegen event or MCD Productions."

Because of MCD's legal threats, many bloggers and internet discussion board users believe the incidents at Oxegen were under-reported in the Irish media. Liberal web magazine Indymedia referred to MCD as "burying" the discussion. The review section of the Sunday Tribune dated 20 August 2006 featured extensive coverage of the situation to date (registration required).

=== Security concerns ===
While MCD's Justin Green said that he was "ecstatic with the success of the event [in 2006], as are the Gardaí and Kildare County Council," questions arise over security and safety for patrons of the festival. MCD did not announce that it would take precautions against the serious anti-social behaviour seen in 2006, nor did it detail the exact security staffing of the 2006 festival which could have allowed them to happen. This was said to be a matter of concern for 2007 and future years.

== Broadcasting rights ==
MTV broadcast the festival across Europe for a second year. RTÉ 2fm also covered the festival for national radio whilst local radio station FM104 broadcast from the arena.

== Stages ==

Oxegen 2006 had at least six stages. These included the Main Stage, the NME Stage, the Green Room, the Dance Arena, the New Bands Stage and one new addition, the Pet Sounds Arena.

- The Main Stage was headlined by The Who and Red Hot Chili Peppers.
- The NME Stage was headlined by Richard Ashcroft and Paul Weller.
- The Green Room was headlined by Primal Scream and Rodrigo y Gabriela.
- The Dance Arena was headlined by Erick Morillo and David Morales.
- The New Bands Stage was headlined by Boy Kill Boy and Humanzi.
- The Pet Sounds Arena was headlined by Kasabian and Sigur Rós.

=== 2006 line-up ===
The main acts that played the festival:

Saturday 8 July

Main Stage

- James Brown
- The Who
- The Strokes
- Arctic Monkeys
- HARD-Fi
- The Magic Numbers
- Damien Dempsey
- Republic of Loose
- Sandi Thom
- The Marshals

NME Stage

- Richard Ashcroft
- Editors
- Feeder
- Dirty Pretty Things
- We Are Scientists
- Delays
- Morning Runner
- The Blizzards
- Captain
- Breaks Co-Op

Pet Sounds Stage

- Kasabian
- Death Cab for Cutie
- Zero 7
- Eels
- José González
- Bic Runga
- Regina Spektor
- Dave Couse
- The Spinto Band
- The Weepies

Sunday 9 July

Main Stage

- Red Hot Chili Peppers
- Franz Ferdinand
- Kaiser Chiefs
- Placebo
- Bell X1
- Manu Chao
- Maxïmo Park
- Director
- Sharon Shannon

NME Stage

- Paul Weller
- Goldfrapp
- Pharrell
- The Zutons
- The Kooks
- The Feeling
- The Cribs
- Wolfmother
- Leya

Pet Sounds Stage

- Sigur Rós
- Ben Harper
- Clap Your Hands Say Yeah
- Corinne Bailey Rae
- The Divine Comedy
- Gemma Hayes
- Xavier Rudd
- Donavon Frankenreiter
- Claire Sproule

Other acts included:

- Primal Scream
- Rodrigo y Gabriela
- Boy Kill Boy
- Humanzi
- Erick Morillo
- David Morales
- The Go! Team
- The Futureheads
- The Charlatans
- Gomez
- Damian Marley
- Mobile
- Orson
- Hope of the States
- Guillemots
- The Rifles
- Delorentos
- The Automatic
- The Fratellis
- Bedouin Soundclash
- Lily Allen
- Paolo Nutini
- Jester
- Timo Maas
- Mylo
- My Alamo
- ¡Forward, Russia!
- Pretty Girls Make Graves

Preceded by Oxegen 2005	Oxegen; 2006	Succeeded by Oxegen '07
