= In Towers and Clouds =

Studio album by The Immediate
- Released: August 18, 2006
- Recorded: Jacobs Studios, Surrey
- Genre: Psychedelic rock; alternative rock; indie rock; post-punk; art rock; shoegaze
- Length: 44:59
- Label: Fantastic Plastic Records
- Producer: Chris Shaw and Conor O'Brien

Professional ratings
Review scores
Source	Rating
Irish Times	4/5 stars
RTÉ	3/5 stars

In Towers and Clouds is the first and only album released by the Dublin quartet The Immediate. The album received generally positive reviews on its launch and was nominated for the 2007 Choice Music Prize.

Shortly after the album's launch, Jim Carroll, a journalist with the Irish Times, wrote an article in the newspaper's weekly entertainment supplement praising the band for choosing to release the album independently. He described the album as containing "cracking songs" and one "which gets bigger, better, bolder and brighter with every listen". This was in contrast with another Dublin based band Humanzi whose major label debut was considered a disaster. After the group's disbandment critics collectively regarded In Towers & Clouds as the finest Irish debut album in the past decade.

The band performed "A Ghost in This House" at the 2007 Meteor Awards.

== Track listing ==
1. "Aspects"
2. "Lonely Locked Up"
3. "Fashion or Faith"
4. "Big Sad Eyes"
5. "Don't You Ever"
6. "Stop and Remember"
7. "You Reflected"
8. "Let This Light Fill Your Eyes"
9. "A Ghost in This House"
10. "In Towers and Clouds"
11. "Can't Stop Moving"

== Singles ==
- "Stop and Remember"
