= Rory and the Island =

Irish rock band

Rory and The Island
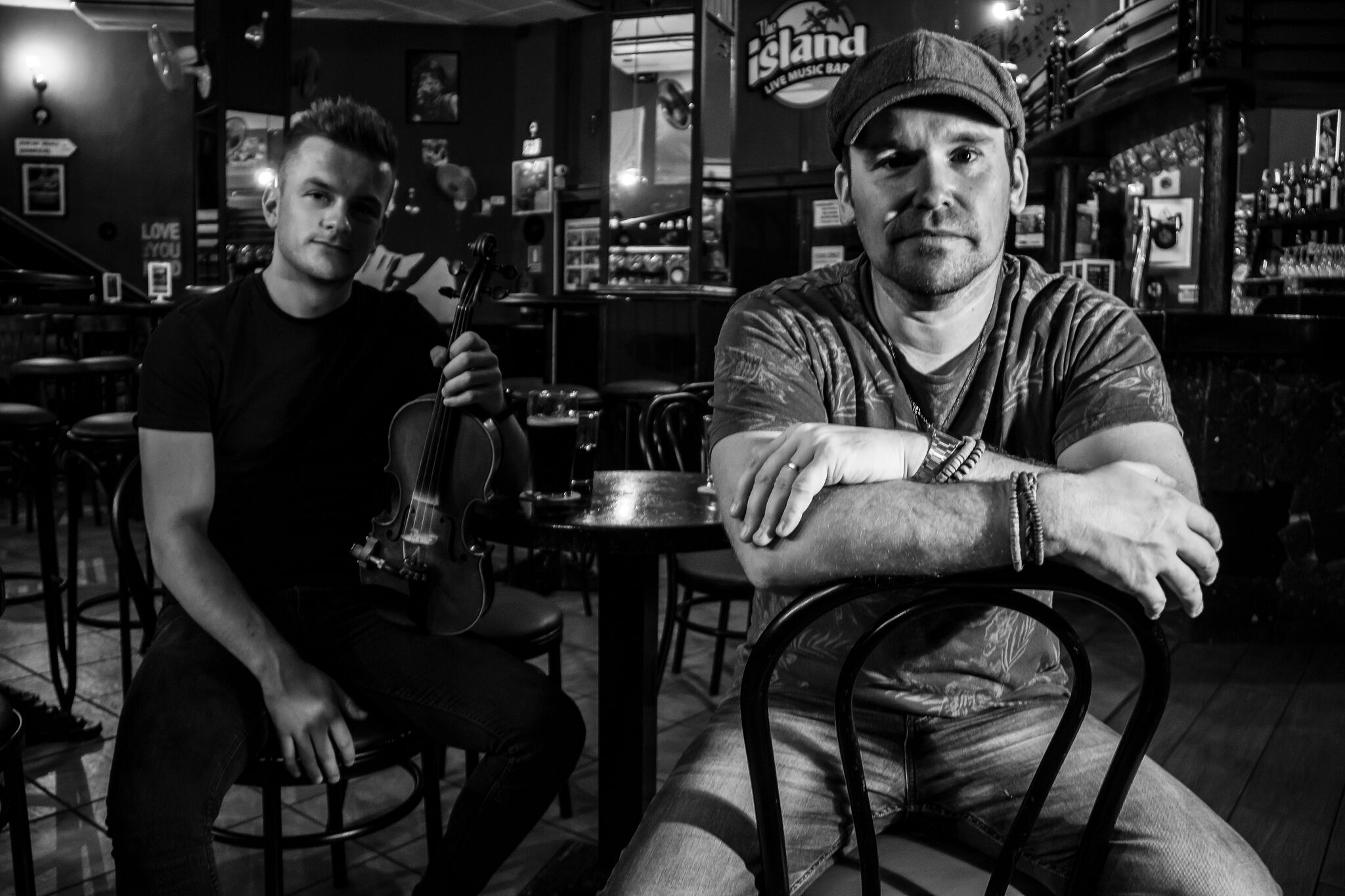
- Rory and The Island, Live Performance

Background information
- Origin: County Donegal, Ireland
- Years active: 2008–present
- Members: Rory Gallagher; Albert Serrano
- Website: roryandtheisland.com

Rory and The Island is a project formed in 2010 and led by Irish singer-songwriter Rory Gallagher, from County Donegal. Based largely in Lanzarote, in the Canary Islands, Gallagher has worked as a resident musician since the late 2000s. The 2012 single "Jimmy's Winning Matches" reached number 11 on the Irish Singles Chart.

Previously Gallagher was bassist and lead vocalist with the Irish indie group The Revs from 2000 to 2007.

== Background ==
Gallagher played bass guitar and sang with The Revs, which he formed with his childhood friends John McIntyre and Michael O'Donnell in Kilcar, County Donegal. The band's debut album Sonictonic, recorded live over two nights at the Temple Bar Music Centre in Dublin, was released in January 2002 and entered the Irish Albums Chart at number 5. Two further albums followed: Suck (2003), which reached number 3, and The Revs (2005), which reached number 26. The band also charted top-20 singles including "Wired to the Moon" and "Alone with You".

The Revs won Best Newcomer at the 2002 Meteor Ireland Music Awards, the only category that year decided by public vote, and took the equivalent award from Hot Press.

The band appeared at the Oxegen festival and its predecessor Witnness on several occasions between 2002 and 2005, and played Slane Castle. They supported Muse and the Hives in Dublin,, the Foo Fighters at Oxegen and later the Kaiser Chiefs. The single "Death of a DJ" was named single of the week by Kerrang! and reached the top 30 in Australia, where the band toured alongside dates in the United States. The Revs disbanded in 2007.

== To present day ==
In 2008, Rory released his official solo debut album "God Bless the Big Bang". It received a positive reaction, with Hot Press magazine declaring it "a Triumphant return", giving it 4 out of 5 stars. It also received album of the week from Today FM, The Sunday World and BBC Radio Ulster. Rory released 2 singles from the album and did two short tours of Ireland. However, he had since become the resident musician in Charlie's Bar in Lanzarote and he found it difficult to go and play in front of 50 people in small venues around Ireland, losing all his money on petrol and hotels when there were already 150 Irish people coming into Charlie's Bar in Lanzarote every night of the week.

In 2010, Rory recorded some new original material with well-known Irish trad player Sharon Shannon (also a reworking of The Pogues classic "Fiesta" with Shane MacGowan); out of these sessions Rory had recorded a comedy demo song called "Ryanair Blues". It was leaked to Irish radio and became a surprise online hit. It was then that Rory started releasing his new material under the name "RORY AND THE ISLAND" as it was a confusing using his birthname Rory Gallagher as many people would show up expecting a tribute to the Cork/ Donegal Blues Legend!

The second album, "Auntie Depressant and Uncle Hope" (2012), also received acclaim from Hot Press magazine, which summarised it as 'a compelling suite of songs'. The album was recorded in various locations around the Spanish island of Lanzarote.

Rory wrote the music for Irish boxer Jason Quigley's debut pro fight in Las Vegas, "Make Way for the Fighting Irish", in July 2014. Quigley now uses this as his arena entrance theme song.

In Oct 2014, Rory played a sold out show to 550 people in the Opium Rooms (The Village) in Dublin. After this show, Rory played "The Academy" venue in Dublin, which holds 1,000 people, supported by Eoin Glackin.

In 2015, Rory and The Island went on tour again in Germany.

The third official studio album, "Watching the sun going down", was released in July 2016.

Rory and the Island gigged six nights a week at The Island Bar in Puerto del Carmen, Lanzarote, which was voted the No.1 Live Music Bar on Trip Advisor for five years running. (2013 - 2018).

Following the sale of the bar, Rory and the Island played in numerous venues around Great Britain, Ireland, New York, Las Vegas and Germany.

In 2020, Rory and his wife Cara decided to open a new live music venue in Edinburgh in Scotland. However, after paying a large sum for the lease and redecorating, the bar never made it to its official opening night of 20 March 2020 due to the global pandemic.

Rory then began live Facebook broadcasting during the pandemic to a huge response, and charted 3 top 20 singles on iTunes during this period.

This led to sold out shows in cities such as Belfast, Dublin, London, and even a guest slot on the BBC from the Edinburgh Fringe Festival in 2021. Rory signed with new Irish indie label "Voices of the Sea" to release his album "Centre Falls Apart", plus a follow up EP "Centre Comes Together" in 2022, Both receiving huge critical acclaim and heavy rotation on spotify and RTÉ.

In 2023, Rory and his wife Cara Gallagher opened "Rory's Corner Bar" in Puerto Del Carmen, Lanzarote, and "BAR 13" in Edinburgh, two new live music bars.

Rory is now owner and resident musician in The Irish Viking Bar in Puerto Del Carmen, Lanzarote.

In 2025, Rory and his wife Cara Gallagher also opened a new music venue in Puerto Del Carmen, Lanzarote - Rory's Live Lounge, where he now performs live shows five nights a week.

In May of 2025, Rory released the song, 'Playa Grande'.

Nine, Rory's ninth album was released on 24 April 2026 through Voices of the Sea. Its nine tracks were recorded at Hirst Studios in Tías, Lanzarote.. The album includes the song Demons, described by Hotpress as the 'definition of a feel-good track'.

== Discography ==
=== Singles ===
- Waterfall (2008)
- Rain Dancer (2008)
- Ryanair Blues (2010)
- Colours (2011)
- Champagne Lifestyle on Coca Cola Wages (2011)
- The Battle to stay positive (2011)
- Jimmy Selling Watches / Overground Artist (2011)
- Boys in Green (2012)
- Jimmy's Winning Matches (2012) No.11 in the Irish Charts
- Ballad of Mad Dog Coll (2013)
- Week of Alcohol (2014)
- Sometimes you shouldn't follow your heart (2014)
- Belfast (2014)
- Peace and Love and Ringo Starr (2015)
- So Little Time (2019)
- When The Lights Go Down (Valhalla) (2020)
- Miss This (2021)
- Donna Don't Take My Summer (2021),
- Playa Grande (2025)

=== Albums ===
- God Bless the Big Bang (2008)- (rory)
- Auntie Depressant and Uncle Hope (2012)
- Dingo Rush EP (2013)
- Watching the sun going down (2016)
- Addicted to Applause (EP) (2019)
- Centre Falls Apart (2022)
- Centre Comes Together (EP) (2022) .
- Nine (2026) .

PREVIOUS:

- 20th Century (released under the name Rory Gallagher) – (1997)
- SonicTonic (THE REVS) – 2002
- Suck (THE REVS) – 2003
- Revs The Revs – 2005
