= The Immediate =

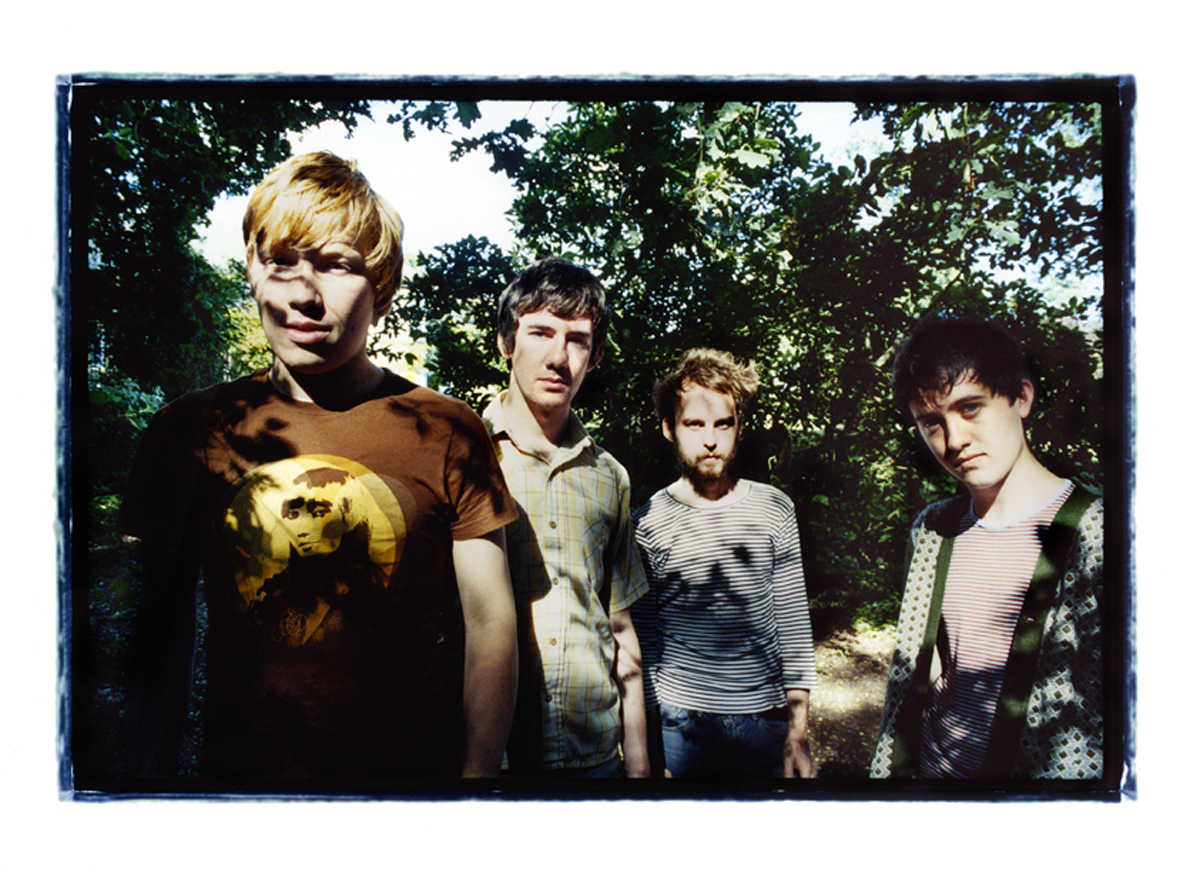
- The Immediate in 2007

Background information
- Origin: Malahide, County Dublin, Ireland
- Genres: Indie, krautrock, neo-new wave, Alternative rock, Post-punk, Art rock, Shoegaze
- Years active: 2003–2007
- Label: Fantastic Plastic Records
- Past members: David Hedderman; Conor O'Brien; Peter Toomey; Barra Heavey
- Website: Official website

The Immediate were an avant-garde Irish rock quartet, based in Malahide, County Dublin. They made a considerable impact on the Irish music scene despite releasing only one album during the span of their association together. The album was In Towers and Clouds (2006). It received primarily positive critical feedback and was nominated for the Choice Music Prize for Irish Album of the Year 2006. Alongside their sole album, several extended plays and singles were also released by the band.

They split suddenly in May 2007, citing "existential differences". The final line-up of the band consisted of David Hedderman (vocals, guitar, bass), Conor O'Brien (vocals, guitar, drums), Peter Toomey (vocals, drums, bass) and Barra Heavey (keys, guitar, bass, drums, backing vocals). The band was known for swapping instruments regularly throughout sets.

== History ==
=== Early days ===
The band members were raised in middle-class Dublin during the Celtic Tiger boom years. O'Brien called it "a spiritually bereft place". They lived in Malahide. Hedderman, O'Brien and Toomey came together at St Conleth's College in Ballsbridge, Dublin. Heavey joined the band at a later stage and they first performed as The Subterraneans. Hedderman studied painting at the National College of Art and Design, while O'Brien studied for an arts degree in English and Philosophy at University College Dublin. The band took their name from their favourite adjective—"immediate".

Among the venues for early gigs were hotel function rooms and a church. The band then spent their college years taking a more direct approach to making themselves known to a wider audience, playing parties and college balls, and occasionally organizing their own shows in Eamonn Dorans, a small pub venue in the centre of Dublin. A CD was thrown onstage at a Manic Street Preachers gig to a bemused Nicky Wire and another was even slipped into Beck's bag with a purchase at a Dublin bookstore. The band spent these formative years honing their craft, with David and Conor focusing on developing their songwriting skills, and Peter on his live performance, which was to become a particularly electrifying aspect of the group's live shows. At this time, guitarist Eoin O'Reilly completed the line-up of the group, and a self-released EP called "Don't Get Lost" (2003) was made available from a select amount of independent Dublin record stores.

They played the Antics indie night in Dublin's Crawdaddy music venue a couple of times.

=== Breakthrough ===
London-based indie label Fierce Panda Records called the band and asked them to release a single. Early in 2005 that label released The Immediate's debut single, "Never Seen/Say This", as a limited edition double A-side 7". XFM and BBC Radio One played the track, and the DJ duo Queens Of Noize included the band on a compilation, leading to numerous shows in London. The band were visited by major labels but spurned these advances, preferring instead to maintain creative control of their work.

Soon afterward, the band signed to another independent label, Fantastic Plastic Records, where they were to record their debut album. For reasons unknown, guitarist Eoin O'Reilly fell out with the group and was soon replaced by friend Barra Heavey, a regular collaborator who, with the introduction of keyboards, brought an electronic edge to the band which honed the overall sound of The Immediate.

Finally, in the second half of 2005, the band entered Jacobs Studios in Surrey where they recorded their debut longplayer with US producer Chris Shaw. The first recordings from this session were released in April 2006 as the acclaimed "make our devils FLOW", a four-track EP on CD and 7" double-pack.

On 18 August 2006, In Towers and Clouds was released in Ireland on Fantastic Plastic to mixed approval. On 25 August, the record debuted in the Irish Albums Chart at number 33 and three weeks later, it was in position number 67. On 18 September, In Towers and Clouds was released in the United Kingdom.

That month, The Irish Times's rock critic Jim Carroll called the record "one of the best Irish debut albums of the last 20 years" and hoped The Immediate would "be around for a long time to come". The Irish Independent's John Meagher named it his fifteenth best Irish album of the 2000s.

Following the album's nomination for the Choice Prize in 2007 (which led to a performance at the awards ceremony on 28 February), the band also performed at the 2007 Meteor Awards. Prior to this (in 2006), The Immediate had headlined the RTÉ 2fm 2moro 2our.

Thoughts turned to a second album soon after the release of the first and Hedderman reported having "a lot of sleepless nights" in their attempt "to get these ideas down right now". On 28 February 2007, a national tour was announced.

=== Split ===
On 19 April 2007, The Immediate were confirmed as performers at that year's Trinity Ball. This proved to be their last performance as the band announced they were to split at the event on Friday 11 May 2007. They later confirmed this in a post on their MySpace page which cited "existential differences" as the reason for the split but which also stated "We all still love each other. Regularly".

The news was greeted with shock, particularly as critics had expected them to eventually become an international success. Meanwhile, the band had on that very Friday been officially announced on Oxegen's website as one of the acts scheduled to perform at the Oxegen 2007 festival in July.

"As a thank you for all the amazing messages we've been getting since the band split" one final song was made available for free download via MySpace; "The Mist Above the Mind" was recorded by The Immediate in early 2007. Soon after the band's split numerous critics regarded them as the new Irish act with the most international potential and agreed they would be sorely missed.

On 9 November 2007, the Irish Independent's entertainment supplement Day & Night published an article by band member Barra Heavey, explaining his take on why the band had come to an end.

O'Brien later joined Cathy Davey's band, before forming Villagers.

== Style ==
O'Brien has said the band's earliest songs were reminiscent of Green Day, with a sound similar to The Kinks eventually evolving. He has claimed The Kinks were "the first band I ever liked", and that he knew the words to "Lola" from a very young age despite the fact "I had no idea what it was about". He sang the song "as a party piece", leaving his sisters "in stitches". Radiohead and Britpop were other influences. According to O'Brien, the band were obsessed with art.

The Irish Independent said "Their moody, jerky rhythms sounded like Franz Ferdinand getting beaten up by Joy Division". Analogue's Brendan McGuirk described them as "Louth's answer to an early form of Radiohead". After witnessing one performance at The Black Box in Belfast, Hot Press commented: "There's a playful grope with U2 here, a quick fumble with Talking Heads there and a covert, climactic Krautrock fondle at the end", while the vocals and guitars on "Stop and Remember" were compared to Gang of Four by the magazine. The Irish Times observed that they did not fit into any of Dublin's "many micro-musical scenes".

== Members ==
- David Hedderman — Vocals, guitar, bass guitar
- Conor O'Brien — Vocals, guitar, drums
- Peter Toomey — Vocals, drums, bass
- Barra Heavey — Keys, guitar, bass guitar, drums, backing vocals

== Discography ==
The Immediate released one album.

- "Don't Get Lost" EP (2003)
- "make our devils FLOW" EP (2006)
- In Towers and Clouds (2006)

== Awards ==
The Sunday Tribune's Una Mullally named The Immediate as the "Best Irish Band" of 2006, saying "they have the ability to be one of the most important Irish bands of the decade, if they can hold it down".

=== Choice Music Prize ===
The Immediate's debut album In Towers and Clouds was nominated for the Choice Music Prize, an award won by The Divine Comedy for the album Victory for the Comic Muse. Toomey had not expected the nomination. The band performed at the award ceremony in Vicar Street on 28 February 2007.

Year	Nominee / work	Award	Result
2007	In Towers and Clouds	Irish Album of the Year 2006	Nominated

=== Meteor Music Awards ===
The Immediate were nominated for Best New Irish Act at the 2006 Meteor Awards.

Year	Nominee / work	Award	Result
2006	The Immediate	Best New Irish Act	Nominated
