= Oxegen 2007 =

Irish music festival held in July 2007

Oxegen '07
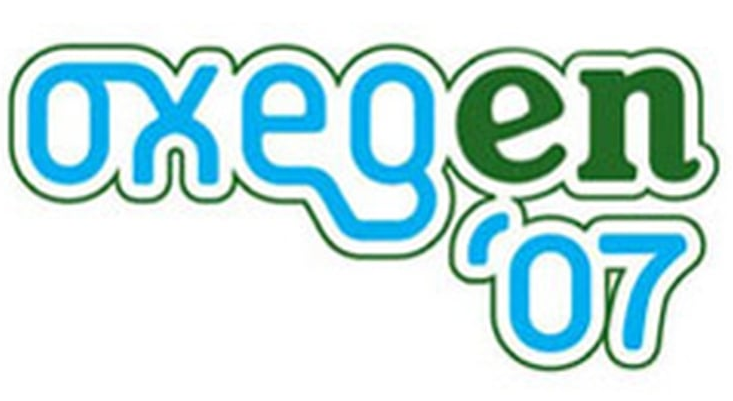

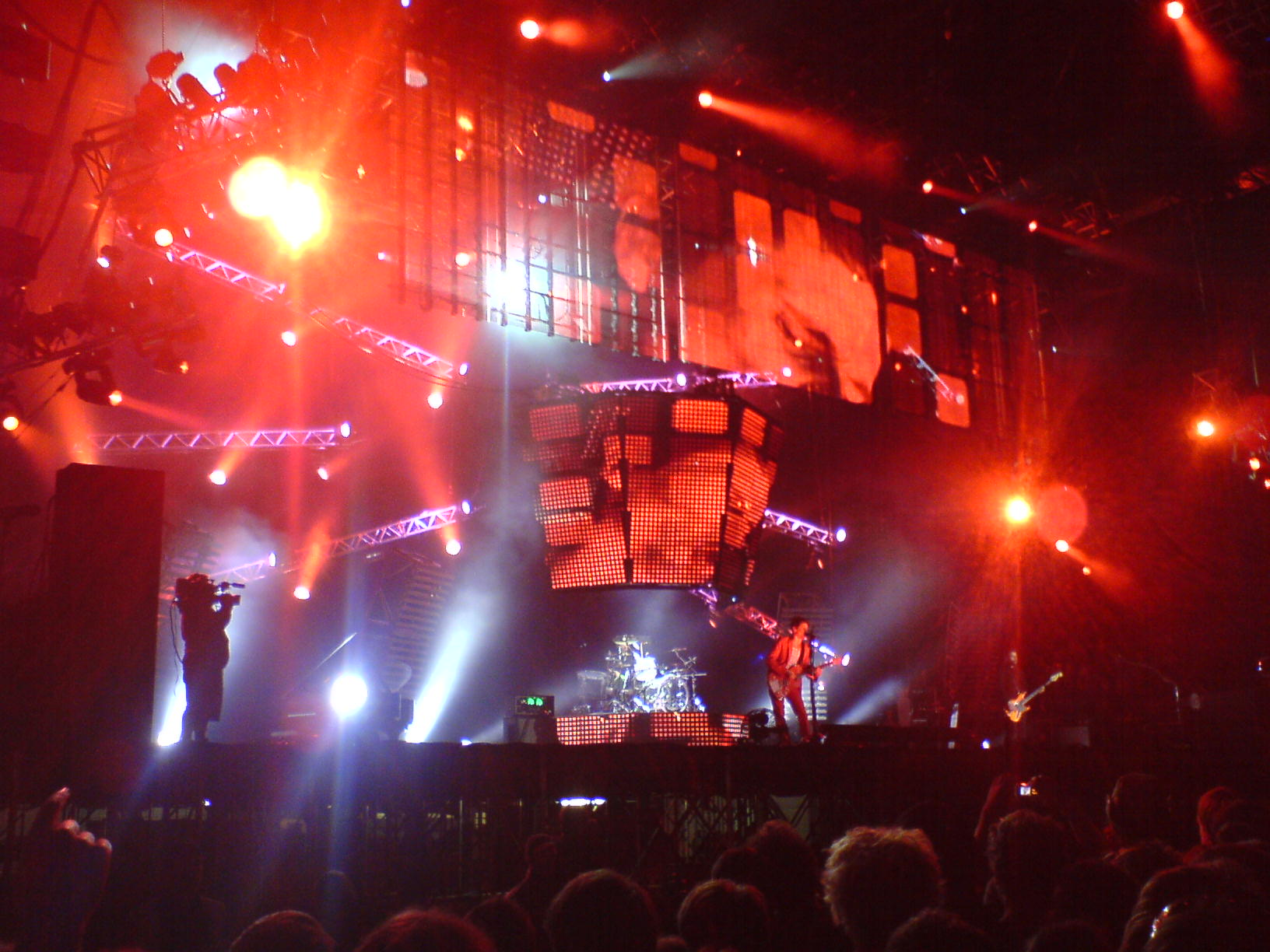
- Muse headlining Oxegen 07.
- Genre: Rock
- Dates: 8–9 July 2007
- Locations: Punchestown Racecourse, County Kildare, Ireland
- Previous event: Oxegen 2006
- Next event: Oxegen 2008
- Website: www.OXEGEN.ie

Oxegen '07 was the fourth Oxegen festival to take place, following the dissolution of its predecessor Witnness in 2004. It took place on the weekend of Saturday, 7 July and Sunday, 8 July at Punchestown Racecourse near Naas in County Kildare, Ireland. The festival was headlined by Muse and Snow Patrol on the Saturday and The Killers on the Sunday. The Live Earth concerts occurred around the world on the same day as the Saturday of Oxegen '07.

== Build-up ==
=== Tickets ===
Tickets went on general sale at 8 am on Friday 2 March 2007. These sold out in under seventy minutes. The price of a day ticket rose to €96.50, a weekend ticket cost €177.50, whilst the price of a weekend ticket plus camping this year rose to €197.50 (roughly the same price as a three-day Electric Picnic ticket), as compared to €160 in 2006. As in 2006, it was possible to purchase four weekend camping tickets together and receive a free car parking ticket. As with previous years, a number of pre-sale tickets went on sale on 10 November 2006 at the same price as the 2006 festival. On 28 February, mtv.co.uk released a limited number of tickets for sale until they went on general sale on 2 March.

=== Unofficial leaks ===
Snow Patrol issued a come-and-get-me plea to the organisers and, at the Meteor Music Awards on 1 February 2007, lead singer Gary Lightbody confirmed that they would be appearing, stating that it would be their only Irish performance of the year. They were the first band to confirm a definite appearance at the festival and were the second headline act on the Main Stage on Saturday 7 July.

In an interview with XFM, Muse singer Matt Bellamy let slip that the band would be playing in Ireland on 7 July, which coincided with the Saturday of the Oxegen festival. Muse later confirmed themselves for the Oxegen Festival on their official website and were announced on the official Oxegen website to be headlining the Main Stage on Saturday 7 July alongside Snow Patrol.

Jake Shears of Scissor Sisters on the Main Stage at Oxegen 07

Further details of the line-up were leaked on Tuesday 20 February 2007 when the Irish Independent printed an article on pages two and three of that day's paper, stating that Arcade Fire would be appearing at Oxegen 07 and that it would be their only Irish festival performance this year. Also confirmed by the newspaper were Bloc Party, Interpol, Cansei de Ser Sexy and Amy Winehouse. This was later confirmed as true by Tom Dunne that morning on the breakfast show on Today FM. Phantom 105.2 also stated that Daft Punk, Kings of Leon and Tori Amos had been confirmed.

=== Line-up officially announced ===
On 15 February, the official Oxegen website's home page disappeared to be replaced with a message that said: "Stand by for Oxegen 2007 news...". Some acts were previously announced in a news flash on the official Oxegen website before being removed again. This news flash seemed to indicate that Arctic Monkeys, Queens of the Stone Age and Eminem would be part of the line-up but, out of these three, only Queens of the Stone Age made an actual appearance (headlining the Green Room on the Saturday night). NME ran with a similar story (confirming Radiohead and Arctic Monkeys) in its special Oasis tribute edition with the notable exclusion of Eminem.

The line-up was then officially announced at 10 am on Thursday 22 February on the official website, with the Independent and Phantom's exclusives proving very much to be true. On Wednesday 28 February, the official website announced more acts that were to play as the festival was officially launched. These included The Killers, Mika, Wu-Tang Clan and The Gossip.

Ocean Colour Scene had also announced themselves on as playing on Sunday 8 July, but according to the Oxegen website they were to play on the Saturday (which they eventually did).

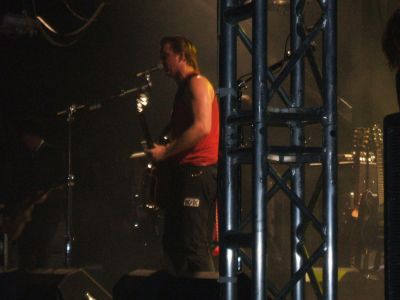
Queens of the Stone Age frontman Josh Homme on the Green Room stage on the Saturday night of Oxegen 07.

On 2 April, the official Oxegen website announced 18 more bands to play at the 2007 festival. These included: Air, Little Man Tate, Queens of the Stone Age, Enter Shikari, Ocean Colour Scene, Bright Eyes, The Long Blondes, Black Rebel Motorcycle Club, The Saw Doctors, Avril Lavigne, Jamie T, The Maccabees, The Pigeon Detectives, The Hold Steady, Gogol Bordello and Sierra Leone's Refugee All Stars.

On 11 May, a total of 14 new acts was officially announced on the website, including: Sinéad O'Connor, Rodrigo y Gabriela, Satellite Party, Badly Drawn Boy, The Brian Jonestown Massacre, Albert Hammond, Jr., The Blizzards, Soulsavers, The Hold Steady, Cold War Kids, Mr Hudson & The Library, Charlotte Hatherley and The Immediate. However, within 48 hours, The Immediate's participation in the festival was cancelled when they announced on their MySpace page that they were "splitting up due to existential differences". The announcement of acts to play the festival was supposed to be completed by the end of May according to the organisers but this was not the case.

Several bands announced themselves for the 2007 festival via their MySpace or Bebo pages. These included Delorentos (Bebo and MySpace) performed on the Pet Sounds Stage on the Saturday, The Sounds and The Bravery who both announced that they would be playing at Oxegen on the Sunday, and The Horrors who announced that they would be playing at Oxegen on the Saturday. The Thrills and The Cribs were previously announced on entertainment.ie.

More new acts and the full stage line-up for all but the New Bands Stage was announced on the official Oxegen website on Tuesday 12 June. The Futures Stage line-up was then announced on Thursday 21 June.

== Festival ==
=== New additions ===
- A competition was held in the run-up to the festival to determine the identity of the two bands which would open the New Band Stage. The winners were My Ok Hotel and Miracle Bell.
- The Laughter Lounge was added to the festival. It was headlined on the Saturday night by Joe Rooney and the Sunday night by David McSavage.
- The NME Stage was rebranded as Stage 2/NME.
- For the first time in 2007, there was a special family area in the campsite reserved for festival-goers with children under 12. However a special car pass was needed for entry to this area and this could be booked via the official website.
- Tangerine Fields was a scheme whereby the festival-goer's campsite was ready pitched. The tents, tipis and yurts were located in a private campsite, with its own showers, toilets and parking areas.
- Camping packs were available to purchase from the official website and included a substantial range of items including a sleeping bag, torch and tent.
- Tent Aid was a scheme operated by Scouting Ireland. For campers who had trouble pitching their tent, members of the Scouting agency assisted for a charitable donation. Campers wishing to recycle their tents after the festival could leave them to be collected by Tent Aid where they were sent to Africa to be reused.

=== Weather ===
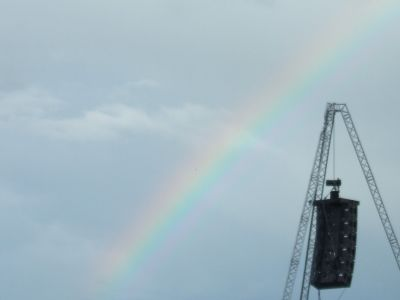
A rainbow was visible as Arcade Fire performed at Oxegen 07.

Rainstorms lashed Punchestown for much of the weekend as the campsite descended into a muddy wasteland by the Friday evening. By the Saturday afternoon the arena too was caked in mud. Sunday saw the mud worsen with festival-goers finding the long trek between the Main Stage and Stage 2/NME even more difficult as they trudged through knee-deep layers of mud and dirty water. There were some sunny spells but these were eventually replaced with frequent rain showers which drew fans away from the main stages and into the marquees. The mud saw much cause for fun as, in particular during The Kooks's performance on the Main Stage on the Sunday, music fans frolicked in the tedious conditions and sparked off a sequence of raucous mud fights which led to many being bustled away by stewards. Conditions made the car parks untenable and gardaí eventually took the step on the Saturday morning to shut down all car parks on the Punchestown site, asking those day-trippers who had not yet arrived to avail of the free public transport from Naas. Punchestown Racecourse was later compared to the Somme.

=== Performances ===
Notable performances at the festival included Muse's' headlining performance on the Saturday night, complete with the sensational sound and spectacular pyrotechnics that wowed Wembley Stadium earlier this summer, Daft Punk's light show on Stage 2/NME Stage on the Sunday night, The Killer's performance the same night, which featured an impressive visual spectacle, Scissor Sisters (at which frontman Jake Shears's drew attention to himself by stripping down to a towel and rolling around in the mud in front of the moshpit, after previously climbing the stage rigging), a bewildered Lovefoxxx of CSS being corrected by the crowd after she asked if they were in Dublin, as well as Bloc Party's rousing performance on the Sunday afternoon as frontman Kele Okereke leaped off the stage and called for the crowd to get "violent". The Kooks followed Bloc Party by playing to a mud-soaked crowd, notable mainly for the chaotic mud-slinging that saw a number of security personnel humbled by raucous festivalgoers (and slippery surfaces)

Arcade Fire were next on the Main Stage to receive a rapturous reception from the Punchestown crowd, especially when frontman Win Butler claimed that Razorlight were "responsible for the rain". He also stated that their performance, along with many of their other Irish shows, had been one of their best. This set featured, amongst other things, a rainbow to accompany "No Cars Go" (pictured), band members Richard Reed Parry and Will Butler duelling with drum sticks on the stage rigging, and singalongs to set closers "Intervention" and "Wake Up".

Bloc Party's Kele Okereke on the Main Stage at Oxegen 07.

The Pigeon Detectives's performance was also memorable as frontman Matt Bowman informed the crowd that he was too clean and then asked if anyone in the audience had any mud or muddy trainers that they could throw at him. This request was readily carried out by the crowd. Bowman himself then proceeded to pick up an armful of mud from the stage and rubbed it over his head. Later he ran down to the crowd, inviting fans to rub his hair, whilst at the end of their popular single "I'm Not Sorry", he jumped off the stage into the crowd. This performance left Stage 2/NME noticeably caked in mud for the rest of the festival.

Tori Amos completely changed her attire (including wig) midway through her performance and Calvin Harris caught a banana that was thrown at him by a member of the audience in mid-song before changing the lyrics of his recent single "The Girls" to "I love Irish girls". The View arrived by helicopter just minutes before they were due to appear, while Avril Lavigne performed a set that included a cover of the Blink 182 song "All the Small Things".

Jet's Nic Cester ran energetically around the Green Room whilst Sam Endicott of The Bravery also launched himself into the Green Room crowd at the end of the band's set. Enter Shikari singer Rou Reynolds joined fans in the front few rows, throwing himself into the crowd several times during their Green Room set, whilst the band also bounced on a trampoline on stage. On the Pet Sounds Stage, having managed to drown out Biffy Clyro who were on the NME Stage at the same time, David Kitt had stewards pull his younger brother out of the crowd and up onto the stage so they could perform a song together. Editors, playing in the Green Room on the Saturday night, and The Blizzards, playing on the Main Stage on the Sunday afternoon, both made their third consecutive appearance at Oxegen.

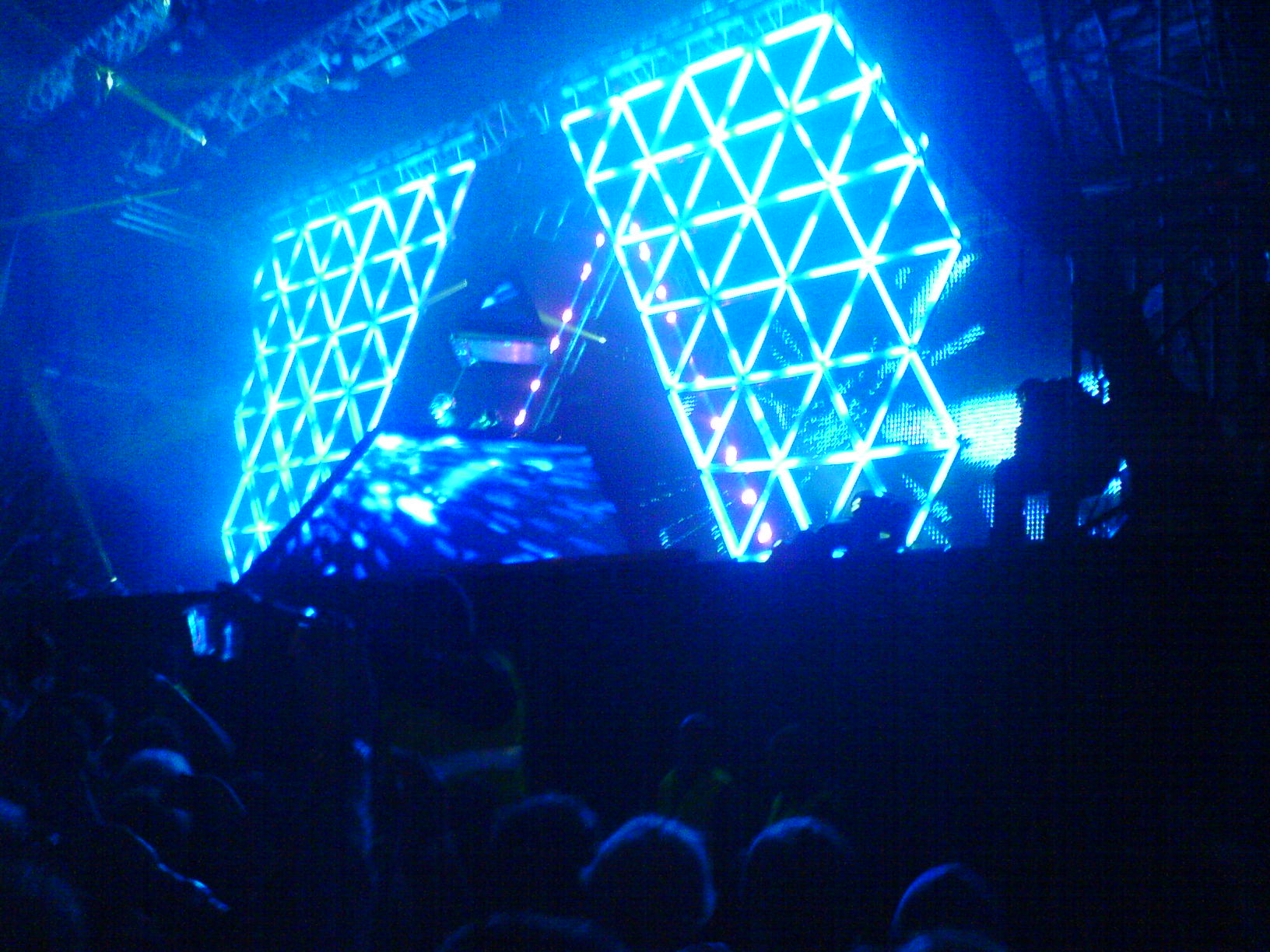
Daft Punk on Stage 2/NME at Oxegen 07

Some fans awaiting the arrival of Interpol on Stage 2/NME on the Saturday were surprised to witness Kings of Leon, fresh from their Main Stage set, walking through the crowd to gain access to the backstage area to watch Interpol's set. They briefly stopped for photographs with amazed fans. Interpol's set was also well received and they were one of the first bands to use lights and smoke in their set as the night progressed. Watching Brazilian band, CSS on Stage 2/NME were members of Arcade Fire alongside Susan Sarandon and Tim Robbins.

Fears over the ability of Pete Doherty to appear proved unfounded as he was reported to have gone on a booze session and then slept on a mattress for two hours in his dressing room before taking to Stage 2/NME with Babyshambles. The band then went on to watch Bright Eyes perform on the Pet Sounds Stage. However Amy Winehouse threw the Sunday line-up on Stage 2/NME into chaos by pulling out of the festival. As a result, many of the acts performing on that stage, such as The Thrills, CSS, Dogs and My Chemical Romance, began earlier or later than planned, to the disapproval of some fans. Another casualty was Snow Patrol keyboardist, Tom Simpson who was arrested following the band's appearance at Live Earth on the same day as their Oxegen performance. Despite this misfortune, the rest of the band carried on as planned as they performed a well-received headlining set that included "Run", "Chasing Cars" and "Open Your Eyes". They even questioned if their loyal fans would rather be over in the Green Room watching Editors instead before dedicating a song to the band.

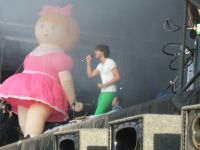
Mika dons Irish colours at Oxegen 07.

Among the bands and artists that performed on the New Band Stage were The Wombats, The Horrors, New Young Pony Club, Kate Nash, Cherry Ghost and Air Traffic.

There were constant references to Ireland in the performances of some of the international acts with Scissor Sisters's Ana Matronic announcing the numerous counties of Ireland from where herself and her bandmates originated (including County Donegal, County Galway and County Cork), Bloc Party's Kele Okereke hoisting a tricolour up on the Main Stage, promptly followed by Pete Doherty mimicking this act on Stage 2/NME and Mika donning a white T-shirt and green bottoms for the occasion (eventually completing the outfit with an orange beret thrown at him by a member of the audience).

=== Backstage ===
According to entertainment.ie and NME.com, Badly Drawn Boy and Tori Amos were involved in an incident backstage. Damon Gough tried to approach Amos backstage to say hello, but was pushed back repeatedly by one of her minders. As he was on before Amos on the Pet Sounds stage later that evening, a clearly irked Gough reportedly said "Tori Amos can wait" as his set ran over, and Amos's crew began setting up around him. When he tried again to approach her backstage as she was getting into a car, he was again pushed back and "banged the car's bonnet" and "threw his Jack Daniels against the windscreen".

=== VIP guests ===
Guests to have been spotted in the VIP area included supermodel Helena Christensen, actress Susan Sarandon, her actor partner Tim Robbins, singer Michael Stipe and actors Josh Hartnett and Stephen Rea. Damien Dempsey, who performed at the 2006 festival, and R.E.M. bassist Mike Mills were spotted watching Sinéad O'Connor on the Pet Sounds Stage. Slane Castle's Henry Mountcharles and model Glenda Gilson also attended. Kate Moss was not to be seen as Pete Doherty took to the stage with Babyshambles, having ended her relationship with the controversial singer the previous week. The presence of members of R.E.M. preceded their appearance at Oxegen '08 as Saturday night headliners.

=== Crime ===
Gardaí arrested approximately 80 people at Oxegen 2007 which, according to official reports, is about the same number as the 2006 festival. 45 people were detained for public order offences, while one person was arrested for assault. 17 people were detained by gardaí at the concert site for possession of drugs whilst more than 20 people were arrested en route to the festival, following finds of small quantities of drugs in searches of coaches and cars. Judge Flann Brennan, who heard these cases at Castleblayney District Court on Monday 16 July, jokingly suggested that the festival should be renamed Intoxegen because of the number of fans arrested for alleged drugs offences.

== Aftermath ==
=== Reaction ===
MCD spokesman Justin Green said: "The reaction from the 80,000 fans is that it's been the best festival to date. It's been a massive success despite the rain."

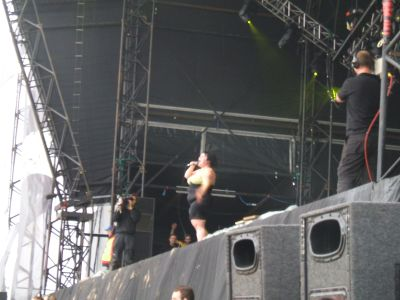
The Gossip's Beth Ditto on Stage 2/NME at Oxegen 07.

=== Disturbances ===
The 2007 Oxegen festival was again the site for anti-social and criminal behaviour, despite claims from organisers MCD that security would be much more robust that year, after the Irish press picked up on apparent 'rioting' and an alleged stabbing that occurred at Oxegen 2006. However, with the closing of the Oxegen website's forum and an external, unofficial forum set up later, by threat of legal action from MCD, many believe that MCD tried to cover up the problems at Oxegen 2006.

The anti-social behaviour led to a statement of condemnation from MCD in which MCD asked anyone who attended the festival that year to email or write about their concerns to Denis Desmond, managing director of MCD, or to email an MCD contact address.

=== Clean-up ===
A huge clean-up operation began at the site on the Monday morning following the festival. More than 1000 staff and personnel worked around the clock for 24 hours to clear tents, litter and stage equipment from the site.

=== Awards ===
- Interpol's performance at Oxegen on 7 July was voted second best gig of 2007 by entertainment.ie.
- The Blizzards won the 2008 Best Live Irish Performance Meteor Award for their performance at Oxegen on 8 July.
- Muse won 2008 Best Live International Performance Meteor Award for their performance at Oxegen on 7 July.
- On 10 January 2008, Oxegen won a Gooseberry Award for Worst Gig of 2007.

== Stages ==
Oxegen 2007 had at least seven stages. These included the Main Stage, Stage 2/NME, the Green Room, the Pet Sounds Arena, the Dance Arena, the New Bands Stage and one new addition, the Laughter Lounge.

- The Main Stage was headlined by Muse and The Killers.
- Stage 2/NME was headlined by Rodrigo y Gabriela and Daft Punk.
- The Green Room was headlined by Queens of the Stone Age and James.
- The Pet Sounds Arena was headlined by Wu Tang Clan and Brian Wilson.
- The MTV Dance Arena was headlined by Felix da Housecat and Erol Alkan.
- The New Bands Stage was headlined by I'm From Barcelona and The Sounds.
- The Laughter Lounge was headlined by Joe Rooney and David McSavage.

=== 2007 Line-up ===
The main acts that played the festival:

Saturday 7 July

Main Stage

- Muse
- Snow Patrol
- Scissor Sisters
- Kings of Leon
- The Fratellis
- The Goo Goo Dolls
- Avril Lavigne
- Director
- The View
- The Cribs

Stage 2/NME

- Rodrigo y Gabriela
- Interpol
- Maxïmo Park
- Mika
- The Gossip
- Biffy Clyro
- The Twang
- The Pigeon Detectives
- Kharma 45
- Frightened Rabbit

Green Room

- Queens of the Stone Age
- Editors
- Jet
- Ocean Colour Scene
- Enter Shikari
- The Bravery
- The Maccabees
- Jack Peñate
- Justin Nozuka
- My Alamo

Pet Sounds

- Wu Tang Clan
- Air
- Tori Amos
- Badly Drawn Boy
- The Brian Jonestown Massacre
- The Hold Steady
- David Kitt
- Delorentos
- The Rumble Strips
- Cathy Davey
- ~~The Immediate~~*

New Band/Futures Stage

- I'm From Barcelona
- Noisettes
- The Junior Boys
- The Horrors
- The Wombats
- You Say Party! We Say Die!
- Zico Chain
- Tokyo Police Club
- The Dykeenies
- Polytechnic
- Cherry Ghost
- The Milk Teeth
- Dirty Epics
- MyOkHotel

MTV Dance Arena

- Felix da Housecat
- 2 Many DJs
- Tiga
- Booka Shade
- Digitalism
- Justice
- Datarock
- M.A.N.D.Y. ?
- Dr.lektroluv
- Jon Averill
- DJ Philth

Laughter Lounge

- Joe Rooney
- Micheal Mee
- Carol Tobin
- Jarlith Regan
- Colum McDonell
- Robbie Bonham
- John Lynn
- Bernard O'Shea
- Dermot Whelan
- Simon O'Keeffe
- MC Steve Cummins

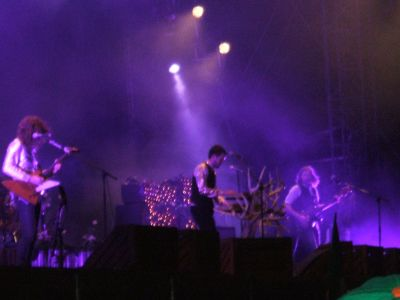
The Killers headlined Oxegen 07.

Sunday 8 July

Main Stage

- The Killers
- Razorlight
- Arcade Fire
- The Kooks
- Bloc Party
- James Morrison
- The Blizzards
- The Saw Doctors

Stage 2/NME

- Daft Punk
- My Chemical Romance
- ~~Amy Winehouse~~*
- Babyshambles
- CSS
- Gogol Bordello
- The Thrills
- Little Man Tate
- Dogs
- The Coronas

Green Room

- James
- Klaxons
- Jamie T
- Satellite Party
- Black Rebel Motorcycle Club
- Dizzee Rascal
- The Long Blondes
- Calvin Harris
- Remi Nicole

Pet Sounds

- Brian Wilson
- Rufus Wainwright
- Bright Eyes
- Cold War Kids
- Sinéad O'Connor
- Albert Hammond, Jr.
- Sierra Leone's Refugee All Stars
- Mr Hudson & The Library
- Charlotte Hatherley
- Loko Parentis

New Band/Futures Stage

- The Sounds
- The National
- The Hours
- New Young Pony Club
- Jason Mraz
- Howling Bells
- Air Traffic
- Ghosts
- Kate Nash
- Foy Vance
- Lost Alone
- Unkle Jam
- Miraclebell

MTV Dance Arena

- Erol Alkan
- Deep Dish
- Frankie Knuckles
- DJ Shadow & Cut Chemist (playing together)
- Cedric Gervais
- Caged Baby
- Modeselektor
- Scott MacNaughton

Laughter Lounge

- David McSavage
- Sue Collins
- Reuben
- Damien Clarke
- Anne Gildea
- Kevin Gildea
- Andrew Stanley
- Eric Lalor
- Willa White
- Aidan Bishop
- MC Keith Farnan

_{* denotes cancelled performance}

Preceded by Oxegen 2006	Oxegen '07	Succeeded by Oxegen '08
