= Oxegen =

Music festival in Ireland

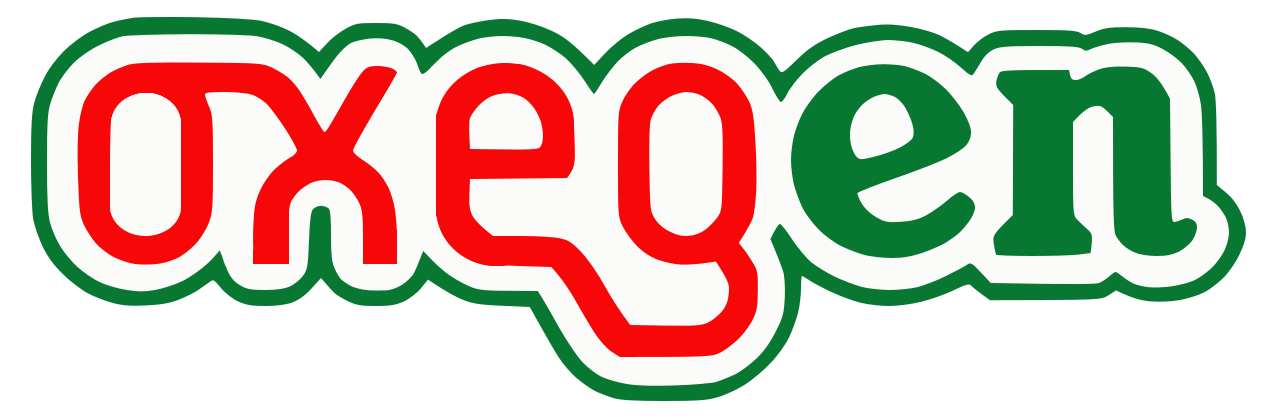
- The Oxegen logo, circa 2010s
- Dates: August 2013
- Locations: Punchestown Racecourse, County Kildare, Ireland
- Coordinates: 53.18443°N 6.62124°W
- Years active: 2004–2011; 2013
- Website: Oxegen.ie (archived)

Oxegen /ˈɒksɛdʒɛn/ was a music festival in Ireland, first held from 2004–2011 as a rock and pop festival and again in 2013 with dance and chart acts only. The event was regularly cited as Ireland's biggest music festival, and, by 2009, it was being cited as the greenest festival, being a 100% carbon neutral event in Ireland, although some critics questioned how environmentally friendly the festival was from 2008 onwards. It was previously called Witnness, which ran from 2000 and was sponsored by Guinness. The event was promoted by MCD and was sponsored by Heineken. Oxegen was originally a three-day festival, but from 2008 onwards, it was expanded to four days.

It took place at the Punchestown Racecourse in County Kildare, Ireland and has an average attendance of around 60,000 a day, with around 50,000 of these camping on site for the duration, and the rest travelling to the site each day. It took place on the same weekend as T in the Park in Scotland and shared a very similar lineup each year, but Oxegen was generally regarded as Ireland's version of the Glastonbury Festival, with the 2008 festival sharing three of the same headliners as its English counterpart.

Oxegen attracted significant attention from outside Ireland, with many of those attending travelling from overseas experiencing a "mass exodus" to the festival. Members of bands such as The Killers, Snow Patrol and R.E.M. have spoken positively of their experiences at the festival. Celebrities frequently attend, including models Helena Christensen (a regular attendant) and television personality Chris Pontius, actor Josh Hartnett, and Ronnie Wood of The Rolling Stones, who was pursued by "half the journalists in the country" and many of his own relatives for much of the 2008 festival. The event has also attracted some negative publicity, particularly following the 2006 festival. This is attributed to such factors as the age of admission (17) and easy access to alcohol.

Oxegen, for two consecutive years, was named as the Best European Festival in a poll which included festivals from France, Netherlands, Spain, United Kingdom and other countries, leading The Sunday Business Post's Nicola Cooke to describe it as "one of the most successful music festivals in Ireland has [sic]". Leagues O'Toole has described it as an "enormously successful, award-winning, established brand [...] aimed at a young audience out for a good time, a post-Leaving Cert rite of passage perfect for acts with big singalong tunes that sound great in the mud". Oxegen received a mention in the Colum McCann short story "Aisling".

In April 2014, organisers announced that the Oxegen festival would not be going ahead that year, citing a lack of suitable headline acts.

== History ==
Oxegen first took place in 2004 over the second weekend in July. The Killers, who went on to headline the festival twice in 2007 and 2009, were one of the bands to appear at the first Oxegen. Dave Keuning, in an interview with Hot Press prior to the 2009 festival, described Oxegen as "a big deal because it's one of the first European festivals we played [sic] when we came over from Vegas in 2004. We only had one hit—"Mr. Brightside"—and were worried in case no one showed. But the tent was packed with people screaming out the words to songs we didn't think they knew. It was that night we thought, 'Hey, something's happening here!' Oxegen more so than Glastonbury even was the highlight of our summer."

The original festival, Witnness, sponsored by Guinness, took place during the start of August with notable headliners, including Oasis, The Foo Fighters and Green Day. In its second and third year, running changed its dates to the second weekend of July. In 2008 Oxegen became a three-day festival.

Rodrigo y Gabriela made their breakthrough after being asked by Damien Rice to perform with him at Oxegen 2004.

The Japanese Popstars formed after viewing several dance acts at Oxegen 2006.

R.E.M. members Michael Stipe and Peter Buck watched several shows from side stage at Oxegen 2007 before returning to headline the festival the following year. Stipe credits his 2007 visit with inspiring him to want to go on tour again, saying: "I saw all these great bands and the next day after the festival we went into the studio."

Muse, known for their spectacular light show and their reputation as one of the best live bands in the world, headlined Oxegen 2007. They returned to headline the mainstage on the Saturday night of the 2010 festival.

Battles played the biggest festival show of their career at that time in the Pet Sounds Arena during Oxegen 2008. The Prodigy played four new songs at Oxegen 2008. Also in 2008, Interpol were sent champagne by U2 as they arrived for rehearsals.

Chad Wolf of Carolina Liar described the band's performance at Oxegen 2009 as "an out-of-body experience".

Each Oxegen has been defined by the attention focused on its own weather, with The Belfast Telegraph referring to 2005 as "the sunny one", 2006 as "the torrentially rainy one", 2007 as "the muddy one" and 2008 as "the so-so one".

2004	2005	2006	2007	2008	2009	2010	2011
Headliners included: The Cure; The Strokes; Kings of Leon; The Libertines; Muse; (more...)	Headliners included: Green Day; Foo Fighters; The Killers; The Prodigy; New Order; (more...)	Headliners included: The Who; Red Hot Chili Peppers; The Strokes; Arctic Monkeys; Franz Ferdinand; (more...)	Headliners included: Snow Patrol; Muse; The Killers; Daft Punk; Razorlight; (more...)	Headliners included: Kings of Leon; Rage Against the Machine; R.E.M. (Setlist); The Verve; The Prodigy; (more...)	Headliners included: Kings of Leon; Blur; Lady Gaga; The Killers; Snow Patrol; (more...)	Headliners included: Eminem; Muse; Arcade Fire; Jay-Z; The Prodigy; Kasabian; Fatboy Slim; (more...)	Headliners included: Coldplay; Foo Fighters; Beyoncé; Arctic Monkeys; The Black Eyed Peas; The Strokes; My Chemical Romance; Pendulum; (more...)

== Facilities ==
As well as the current eight stages of music, there were three large areas for camping which were subdivided by number and the colours blue, red and green – which was the VIP campsite. The backstage and media areas were located in the middle of the site in the buildings normally used to watch the races. Stalls and shops were also provided for festival-goers, as well as toilet and shower areas for campers from 2006 onwards.

A Centra store was located in each campsite from 2007 onwards and An Post first appeared at the festival in 2008. There was also a funfair adjacent to the arena, featuring a big wheel and other rides, such as the "Magic Carpet", the "Big Drop", and the roller coaster. In 2008, an additional funfair was located in the blue campsite alongside other campsite entertainment such as a circus, silent disco and the Xbox Live Stage. Glass in any form was banned from the festival site and bottle corks, cans and umbrellas are banned from the concert arena.

52 miles of fencing are used across the site. 14 megawatts of power are used to energise Oxegen, with 28,000 miles of cable used to transfer this power. 25,000 litre water tankers are located around the site. Hats and cloaks are regularly seen, whilst wellies are also commonly worn by festival-goers.

The Dance Arena was a large shed previously used for ideal homes exhibitions.

== 2004 Festival ==
Oxegen 2004 took place at Punchestown Racecourse from 10 to 11 July. The Strokes, The Cure, Basement Jaxx, The Darkness, Faithless, Kings of Leon, PJ Harvey, Wu-Tang Clan, The Libertines, Muse, Massive Attack, Keane, Franz Ferdinand, Chemical Brothers, Belle & Sebastian, Scissor Sisters, Elbow, Electric Six, Ocean Colour Scene, The Complete Stone Roses and Cartoon are some of the bands that played at the 2004 festival which took place over five stages. Orbital played their last ever Irish show at the festival, whilst The Black Eyed Peas performed in Ireland for the first time in over two years. The Killers, Republic of Loose and Razorlight were among the bands headlining the New Band Stage. Other Irish acts to appear included Ash, The Divine Comedy, Hothouse Flowers, The Saw Doctors, HAL, Snow Patrol, The Devlins, Simple Kid, Maria Doyle Kennedy, Cathy Davey and Bell X1. David Bowie was due to headline the festival but had to pull out due to illness. Kings of Leon's performance was threatened by an incident at Roskilde the weekend before Oxegen when Nathan Followill injured his wrist but, despite the cancellation of a midweek show in Serbia, the band turned up for Oxegen.

Tickets sold out a week before the event, having gone on sale on Friday 5 March. One-day tickets cost €59.50, two-day tickets were priced at €110.00 whilst a two-day ticket with camping included cost €130.00.

=== 2004 Line-up ===
The main acts that played the festival were:

Saturday 10 July	Sunday 11 July (running order)
Main Stage: The Cure; The Strokes; Kings of Leon; PJ Harvey; The Divine Comedy; Franz Ferdinand; Scissor Sisters; Goldie Lookin Chain; Kharma 45; Hal	Main Stage: ~~David Bowie~~*; The Darkness; Muse (moved to the main stage); Ash; Faithless; Pink; The Black Eyed Peas; Hothouse Flowers; The Saw Doctors

* – denotes cancelled performance

== 2005 Festival ==
Oxegen 2005 took place at Punchestown Racecourse from 9 to 10 July. Green Day and Foo Fighters headlined. Also appearing were New Order, Ian Brown, James Brown, The Prodigy, Queens of the Stone Age, The Frames, Keane, Feeder, The Killers, Bloc Party, Kaiser Chiefs, Kasabian, The Bravery, Nine Black Alps, The Departure, Razorlight, LCD Soundsystem, Echo & the Bunnymen, The La's and Snoop Dogg. Irish acts to appear included The Revs, The Saw Doctors, Kerbdog, HAL, Bronagh Gallagher, Humanzi, Director and The Blizzards.

=== 2005 Line-up ===
For full line-up, see Oxegen 2005#2005 Line-up.

The main acts that played the festival were:

Saturday 9 July

Oxegen Stage

- Green Day
- The Frames
- Snoop Dogg
- Razorlight
- Kaiser Chiefs
- Queens of the Stone Age
- The Saw Doctors
- Björn Again
- The Stands

Sunday 10 July

Oxegen Stage

- Foo Fighters
- Keane
- The Killers
- The Streets
- Audioslave
- Feeder
- The Beautiful South
- The Revs

== 2006 Festival ==
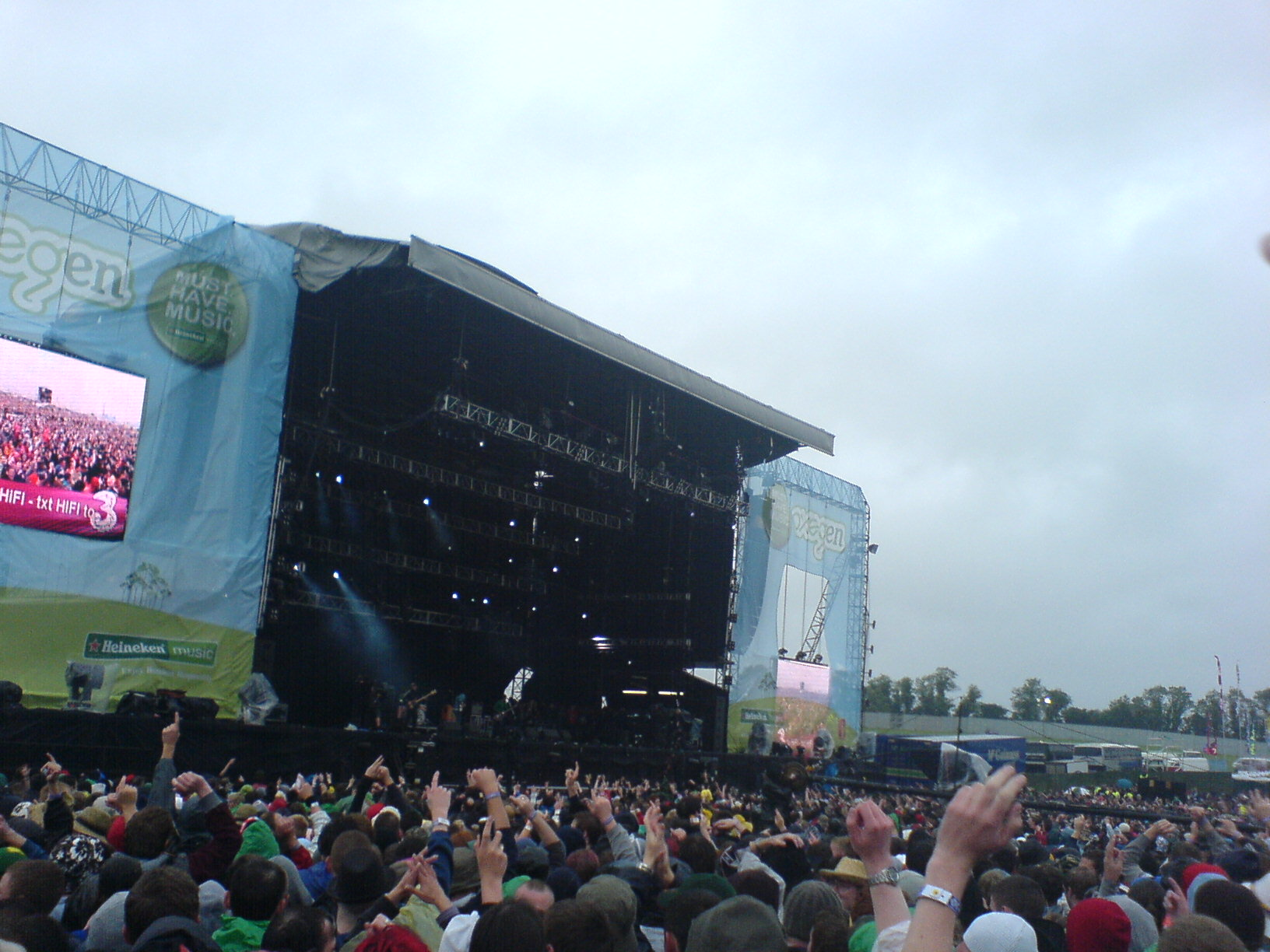
The Main Stage on the Saturday of Oxegen 2006

Oxegen 2006 took place at Punchestown Racecourse from 8 to 9 July. A limited number of tickets for the festival went on sale a week after the 2005 festival on Friday 15 July. On 20 February the festival was launched and the first acts were officially announced. Tickets went on general sale on Friday 3 March at 8 am, with weekend camping tickets priced at €160. This allocation of tickets sold out within 48 minutes. The festival itself encountered bad weather which eclipsed previous records. There were improvements on the Sunday afternoon with sunny skies and a cool, gentle breeze ensuring a decrease in wet festival-goers.

The Who and Red Hot Chili Peppers headlined the festival, the former performing live in Ireland for the first time in 35 years, the latter for the fourth time in five summers. James Brown made his last ever live performance at an Irish festival and Arctic Monkeys their first festival appearance in Ireland. Also appearing were The Strokes, Franz Ferdinand, Kaiser Chiefs, Placebo, Richard Ashcroft, Primal Scream, Editors, Feeder, The Kooks, Kasabian, Sigur Rós, Jester, The Feeling, The Futureheads, The Go! Team, The Automatic, Paolo Nutini and Lily Allen. Irish acts to appear included Bell X1, Damien Dempsey, Republic of Loose, Director, The Marshals, Sharon Shannon, The Blizzards, The Divine Comedy, Gemma Hayes and Humanzi.

Security arrangements were criticised as being poor by some sections of the media. The camp-site was not free from trouble, with reports of tent-burning and an alleged stabbing on the Sunday night/Monday morning of the festival. In the Green Room a considerable leak allowed rain into the enclosed marquee. There were 225 arrests for drugs (with 13 charged for possession with intent to supply), one alleged rape, and the Evening Herald reported that around 250 people were treated for alcohol and drug abuse. When 40 people were sent to Naas General Hospital, fears were raised of a bad batch of ecstasy, but no evidence of such a batch was found. A number of media outlets were threatened with legal action on their coverage of Oxegen 2006 in its aftermath. These included the Irish Independent and boards.ie, where all discussion of MCD events and venues was banned.

=== 2006 Line-up ===
For full line-up, see Oxegen 2006#Stages.

The main acts that played the festival were:

Saturday 8 July

Main Stage

- James Brown
- The Who
- The Strokes
- Arctic Monkeys
- Hard-Fi
- The Magic Numbers
- Damien Dempsey
- Republic of Loose
- Sandi Thom
- The Marshals

Sunday 9 July

Main Stage

- Red Hot Chili Peppers
- Franz Ferdinand
- Kaiser Chiefs
- Placebo
- Bell X1
- Manu Chao
- Maxïmo Park
- Director
- Sharon Shannon

== 2007 Festival ==
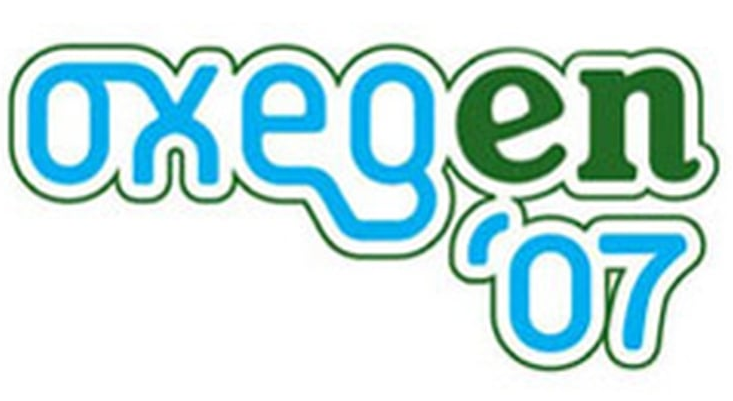

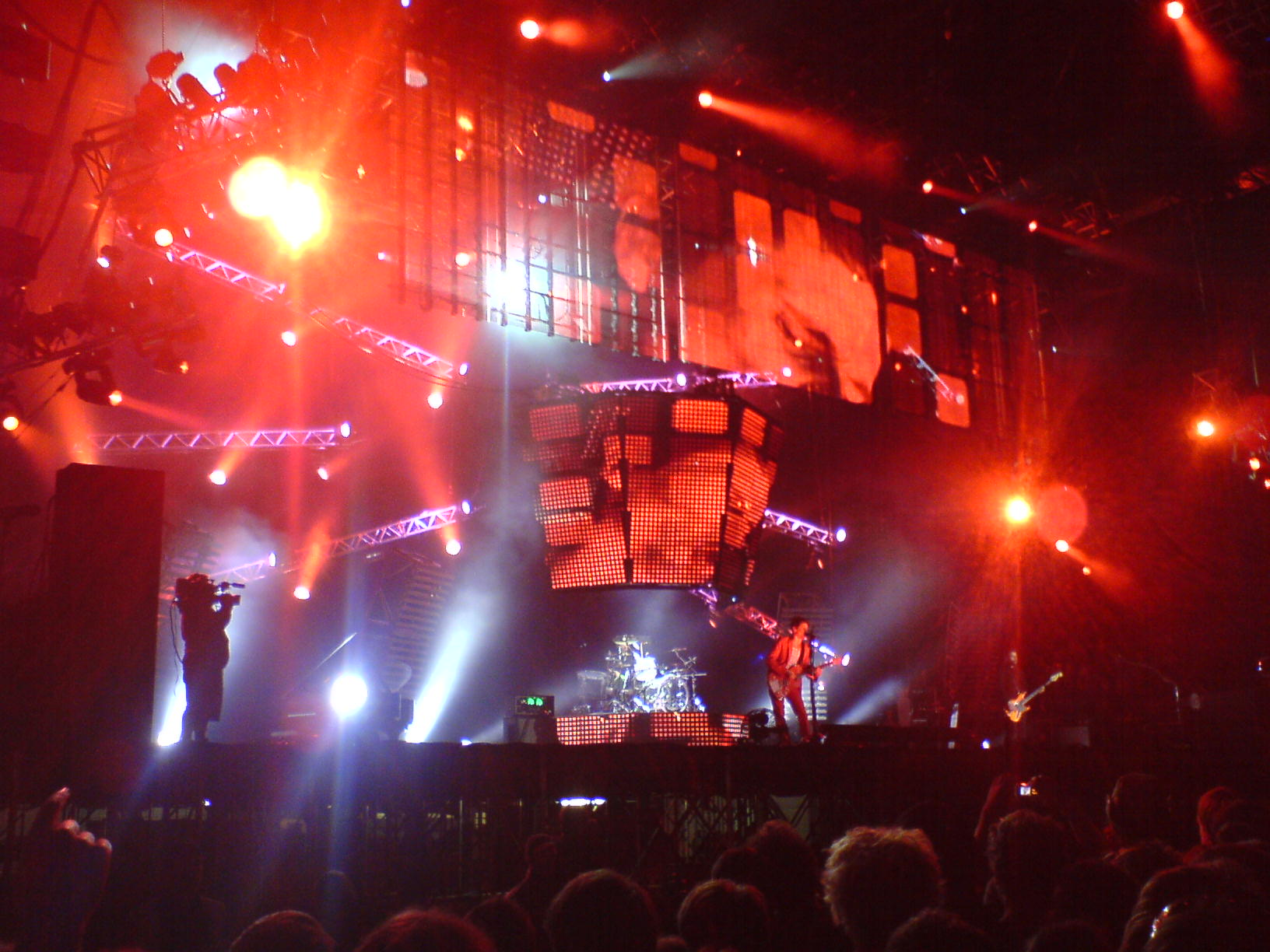
Muse headlined Oxegen 07

Oxegen '07 took place at Punchestown Racecourse from 7 to 8 July. The Live Earth concerts occurred around the world on the same day as the Saturday of Oxegen 2007. Tickets went on general sale at 8 am on Friday 2 March 2007. These sold out in under seventy minutes. The price of a day ticket rose to €96.50, a weekend ticket cost €177.50, whilst the price of a weekend ticket plus camping this year rose to €197.50 (roughly the same price as a three-day Electric Picnic ticket), as compared to €160 in 2006. As in 2006, it was possible to purchase four weekend camping tickets together and receive a free car parking ticket. As with previous years, a number of pre-sale tickets without the price increase went on sale in November 2006.

The headliners were Muse and The Killers. Also playing the festival were Arcade Fire, Scissor Sisters, Razorlight, Bloc Party, Daft Punk, Kings of Leon, Brian Wilson, Interpol, The Kooks, Mika, My Chemical Romance, Avril Lavigne, Queens of the Stone Age, The Goo Goo Dolls, Editors, Klaxons, Maxïmo Park and The Fratellis. Irish acts that played included The Blizzards, Director, The Thrills, The Coronas, David Kitt, Delorentos, Dirty Epics and Sinéad O'Connor. Amy Winehouse pulled out at the last minute whilst The Immediate split up on the same day that they were announced.

=== 2007 Line-up ===
For full line-up, see Oxegen 2007#2007 Line-up.

The main acts that played the festival were:

Saturday 7 July	Sunday 8 July
Main Stage: Muse; Snow Patrol; Scissor Sisters; Kings of Leon; The Fratellis; The Goo Goo Dolls; Avril Lavigne; Director; The View; The Cribs	Main Stage: The Killers; Razorlight; Arcade Fire; The Kooks; Bloc Party; James Morrison; The Blizzards; The Saw Doctors

Saturday 7 July	Sunday 8 July
Stage 2/NME: Rodrigo y Gabriela; Interpol; Maxïmo Park; Mika; The Gossip; Biffy Clyro; The Twang; The Pigeon Detectives; Kharma 45; Frightened Rabbit	Stage 2/NME: Daft Punk; My Chemical Romance; ~~Amy Winehouse~~*; Babyshambles; CSS; Gogol Bordello; The Thrills; Little Man Tate; Dogs; The Coronas

* – denotes cancelled performance

== 2008 Festival ==
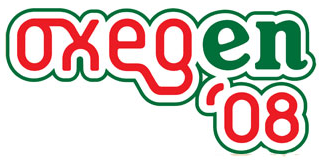

Oxegen '08 was a three-day event, a first for the festival. It took place from Friday 11 July until Sunday 13 July at Punchestown Racecourse in Naas, County Kildare. Presale tickets went on sale at 8:00 am on Friday 30 November 2007 at a cost of €197. Actual sale tickets went on sale at 8:00 am on Friday 7 March 2008 but failed to sell out until 7 May. Extra tickets went on sale on 20 June in "a move to combat touting".

Kings of Leon were the first band to be announced on 27 November 2007 at 5:00 pm They headlined the opening night of the festival. On 15 February 2008 R.E.M. were confirmed for Oxegen 2008, headlining the Saturday night. On 19 February at 16:29, Kaiser Chiefs, The Raconteurs and Ian Brown were announced on the official website, followed by The Fratellis, Interpol and Counting Crows the next day. The Chemical Brothers and Justice were amongst those added on 21 February, whilst on 22 February Rage Against the Machine were the last of the headliners to be confirmed. On Sunday 24 February, The Verve were confirmed on the official website for an appearance at Oxegen 2008, performing last on the Main Stage on the Saturday. In the following months more bands were announced including Stereophonics, The Prodigy, Panic! at the Disco, The Feeling, Editors, Kate Nash, Bowling for Soup, The Hoosiers, Newton Faulkner, Scouting for Girls, The Zutons, Battles, The Wombats, The Subways, Ben Folds, The Stranglers, Amy Macdonald, Alphabeat, Amy Winehouse, The Pogues, The Charlatans, The Swell Season, Manic Street Preachers, Echo & the Bunnymen, The Ting Tings, Black Kids, MGMT, The Kooks, Groove Armada, The National, Tricky, The Go! Team, Feeder, The Pigeon Detectives, The Enemy and One Night Only. Irish performers to play the festival included The Blizzards, Republic of Loose, Róisín Murphy, Bell X1, Mundy, Aslan, Paddy Casey, The Coronas, The Saw Doctors, The Kinetiks, Dirty Epics, Declan O'Rourke, Delorentos, Future Kings of Spain, Concerto For Constantine, God Is an Astronaut, The Script, Fight Like Apes, Codes and Oppenheimer.

In late 2008, Oxegen '08 won the "Yourope Award for Best European Festival" which was voted for by members of the public from across Europe. The festival was chosen ahead of rivals such as Glastonbury, Roskilde and T in the Park.

=== 2008 Line-up ===
For full line-up, see Oxegen 2008#Stages.

The main acts that played the festival were:

Friday 11 July	Saturday 12 July	Sunday 13 July
Main Stage: Kings of Leon; Interpol; Editors; Paddy Casey; The Coronas; Amy Macdonald	Main Stage: R.E.M.; The Verve; Stereophonics; Amy Winehouse; Counting Crows; Newton Faulkner; Scouting for Girls; Bowling for Soup	Main Stage: Rage Against the Machine; Kaiser Chiefs; The Fratellis; The Kooks; The Blizzards; The Feeling; Eddy Grant

Friday 11 July	Saturday 12 July	Sunday 13 July
The O2 Stage: Groove Armada; The Go! Team; Ben Folds; dEUS; Sugababes; Future Kings of Spain	The O2 Stage: The Prodigy; The Zutons; Feeder; Panic! at the Disco; The Enemy; The Hoosiers; The Wombats; Powderfinger; One Night Only; ~~Little Man Tate~~*	The O2 Stage: The Chemical Brothers; The Raconteurs; Republic of Loose; Kate Nash; The Pigeon Detectives; We Are Scientists; The Courteeners; The Subways

* – denotes cancelled performance

Friday 11 July	Saturday 12 July	Sunday 13 July
Green Room: Bell X1; Mundy; Aslan; Captain; The Saw Doctors; The Kinetiks; Dirty Epics	Green Room: Manic Street Preachers; The Charlatans; Pendulum; Echo & the Bunnymen; Vampire Weekend; British Sea Power; The Ting Tings; The Brian Jonestown Massacre; Delays; Concerto For Constantine	Green Room: Ian Brown; The Pogues; Tom Baxter; Reverend and the Makers; Jack Peñate; Alabama 3; The Stranglers; The Hold Steady; The Whigs; Saki Cult

Friday 11 July	Saturday 12 July	Sunday 13 July
Pet Sounds: Cat Power; Aphex Twin; Tricky; Battles; God Is an Astronaut	Pet Sounds: The National; Hot Chip; Richard Hawley; Seasick Steve; Declan O'Rourke; Paul Heaton; My Morning Jacket; Camille O'Sullivan; Jack McManus	Pet Sounds: Glen Hansard & Markéta Irglová; Róisín Murphy; Band of Horses; MGMT; Delorentos; Lightspeed Champion; David Jordan; Ryan Bingham

== 2009 Festival ==
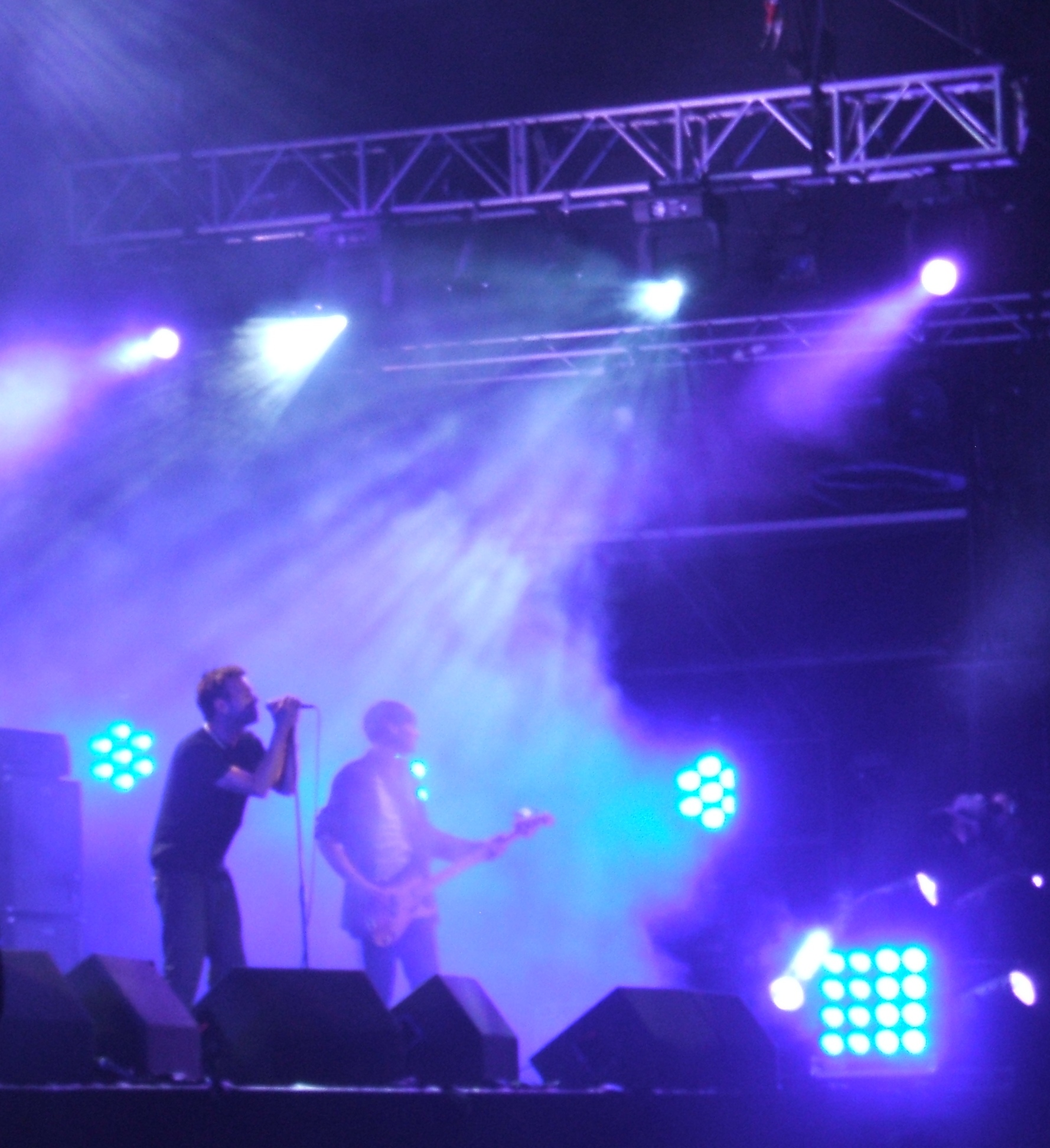
Damon Albarn and Alex James of Blur on the Main Stage as the band headline Oxegen '09.

Oxegen '09 took place over three days between 10–12 July with Kings of Leon, Snow Patrol, Blur and The Killers headlining.

=== 2009 Line-up ===
The following are condensed tables of the line-up. For more details, see: Oxegen 2009#2009 Line-up.

Friday 10 July	Saturday 11 July	Sunday 12 July
Main Stage: Snow Patrol; The Script; Lily Allen; James; The Coronas; The Artane Band & The Brilliant Things; Florence and the Machine	Main Stage: Kings of Leon; Bloc Party; Elbow; Yeah Yeah Yeahs; James Morrison; The Blizzards; Squeeze; The Saw Doctors	Main Stage: The Killers; Razorlight; The Specials; Paolo Nutini; Lady Gaga; Calvin Harris; Ocean Color Scene

Friday 10 July	Saturday 11 July	Sunday 12 July
The O2 Stage: Keane; Pendulum; Fun Lovin' Criminals; Therapy?; The Answer; Telegraphs	The O2 Stage: Nick Cave and the Bad Seeds; Doves; The Mars Volta; Maxïmo Park; Eagles of Death Metal; ~~The Game~~; The Gaslight Anthem; Red Light Company	The O2 Stage: Nine Inch Nails; Jane's Addiction; The Ting Tings; Katy Perry; White Lies; Starsailor; You Me at Six; The Horrors

Friday 10 July	Saturday 11 July	Sunday 12 July
Heineken Green Spheres: 2 Many DJ's; Republic of Loose; Mogwai; Fight Like Apes; Dreadzone; God Is An Astronaut; Dirty Epics	Heineken Green Spheres: Jerry Fish & The Mudbug Club; Pet Shop Boys; TV on the Radio; Pete Doherty; Regina Spektor; The Saturdays; Daniel Merriweather; Gary Go; Fred	Heineken Green Spheres: Manic Street Preachers; Glasvegas; Jason Mraz; Foals; Friendly Fires; That Petrol Emotion; Noisettes; Iglu & Hartly

== 2010 Festival ==
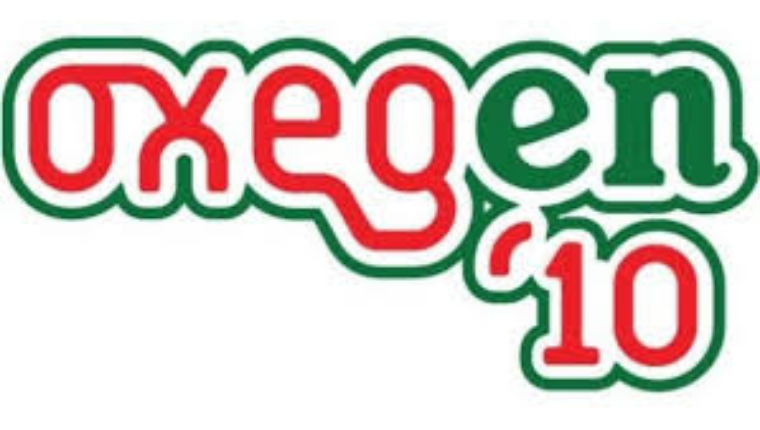

Oxegen 2010 was held between 9–11 July in Punchestown Racecourse, Naas, Ireland. Eminem, Muse, Arcade Fire, Jay-Z, The Black Eyed Peas, Kasabian, The Prodigy, Fatboy Slim, Florence and the Machine, Paolo Nutini, Faithless, Editors, Bell X1, Stereophonics, David Guetta, Dizzee Rascal, Doves, Julian Casablancas, The Stranglers, Earth, Wind & Fire, Echo & the Bunnymen, The Cribs, The Overview, Hot Chip, Calvin Harris, Republic of Loose, Newton Faulkner, The Temper Trap, Empire of the Sun, Goldfrapp, Gossip, La Roux, Rise Against, Ocean Colour Scene, The Coral, The Coronas, The Courteeners, Broken Social Scene, Vampire Weekend, Mumford & Sons, Ellie Goulding, Laura Marling, Two Door Cinema Club, Scouting for Girls, The Middle East, Armand Van Helden, Steve Angello, Simian Mobile Disco, Erol Alkan, Jamie T, Steve Aoki, A-Trak and Aeroplane are among the acts set to perform.

Oxegen 2010 was scheduled to be Arcade Fire's first Irish appearance since performing in the Phoenix Park and was their first 2010 European show to be confirmed. Bell X1 gave their only Irish performance of the summer at the event on 11 July. Biffy Clyro were added as well as Plan B and Kids in Glass Houses. Barry "The Blender" Henderson (of "I Am Fighter" fame) also made an appearance. An anticipated appearance by Jedward did not materialise***. Control Thieves did not appear at that year's festival. Irish band The Overview were also rumoured to be a late addition to the line-up.

=== 2010 Line-up ===
Main Stage

Friday 9 July	Saturday 10 July	Sunday 11 July
Arcade Fire; Jay-Z; Stereophonics; Vampire Weekend; The Black Keys; The Coronas; Eliza Doolittle	Muse; Kasabian; Dizzee Rascal; Florence & the Machine; Biffy Clyro; Two Door Cinema Club; The Stranglers	Eminem; Faithless; Paolo Nutini; Bell X1; Newton Faulkner; Earth, Wind & Fire; Echo & the Bunnymen

Vodafone Stage

Friday 9 July	Saturday 10 July	Sunday 11 July
Fatboy Slim; Groove Armada; Scouting for Girls; Plan B; Republic of Loose; Drake; Fox Avenue	The Black Eyed Peas; Doves; Editors; The Cribs; Rise Against; Tinariwen; Kids in Glass Houses	The Prodigy; Thirty Seconds to Mars; The Temper Trap; Joshua Radin; D12; Professor Green; The Knux

Heineken Green Spheres Stage

Friday 9 July	Saturday 10 July	Sunday 11 July
David Guetta; Goldfrapp; Empire of the Sun; The Coral; Delorentos; God Is an Astronaut; Kassidy	Calvin Harris; Hot Chip; Gossip; La Roux; Cathy Davey; Ellie Goulding; Wallis Bird; Panama Kings	Mumford & Sons; Ocean Colour Scene; The Courteeners; Jamie T; We Are Scientists; Kate Nash; Diana Vickers; General Fiasco

== 2011 Festival ==
Oxegen 2011 was held between 7–10 July. Foo Fighters, Arctic Monkeys, Coldplay, My Chemical Romance, Beyoncé, Slash, The Black Eyed Peas, The Strokes, Weezer, Beady Eye and Paolo Nutini were among the international artists to play. The Script, Whipping Boy, Imelda May, Two Door Cinema Club, Maverick Sabre, Fight Like Apes, Bressie, Royseven, Ryan Sheridan, The Rubberbandits and The Minutes were among the Irish artists to play. English pop artist Jessie J announced on 30 June that she would be unable to play the festival after falling off stage and breaking her foot which required surgery.

=== 2011 Line-up ===
Main Stage
Friday	Saturday	Sunday
The Black Eyed Peas; The Script; My Chemical Romance; Weezer; All Time Low; The Blackout; Fun Lovin' Criminals	Foo Fighters; Arctic Monkeys; Beady Eye; Plan B Two Door Cinema Club; Big Country	Beyoncé; Coldplay; Slash; Manic Street Preachers; Kesha; Ryan Sheridan; The Rubberbandits

Vodafone Stage
Friday	Saturday	Sunday
The Strokes; Swedish House Mafia; Tinie Tempah; The Saw Doctors; House of Pain; The Original Rudeboys; The Plea; Glen Call	Deadmau5; Paolo Nutini; Imelda May; Bruno Mars; Hurts; British Sea Power; The Minutes; Alice Gold	Pendulum; The National; Jimmy Eat World; Friendly Fires; Fight Like Apes; Royseven; The Kanyu Tree

Heineken Green Spheres
Friday	Saturday	Sunday
Leftfield; Calvin Harris; Example; Whipping Boy; Peter Hook & The Light; Her Majesty & The Wolves; The Riptide Movement; Gypsies on the Autobahn	Propaganda DJs; Brandon Flowers; The Vaccines; Professor Green; The Pretty Reckless; Bressie; Cashier No.9; Fox Avenue; Little Green Cars	Primal Scream; Chase and Status; Crystal Castles; OFWGKTA; Ocean Colour Scene; The Saturdays; Grouplove; Neon Trees

2FM Hotpress Academy
Friday	Saturday	Sunday
Glasvegas; Noah and the Whale; The Naked and Famous; Metronomy; Clare Maguire; Tame Impala; Keywest; Cherri Bomb; Readers Wives; Madisun	Eels; City and Colour; Mona; Miles Kane; Eliza Doolittle; Kitty Daisy & Lewis; Frankie & The Heartstrings; Braids; Sweet Jane; Consumer Love Affair	Bright Eyes; The Airborne Toxic Event; Jenny & Johnny; Patrick Wolf; The Twilight Singers; The Pierces; Bipolar Empire; Brother; The Kapitals

Redbull Electric Ballroom
Friday	Saturday	Sunday
Sven Väth; Tiga; The Shit Robot Show; Justin Robertson; Maverick Sabre; Bitches With Wolves; Fenech-Soler; Colin Perkins	The Bloody Beetroots; Philth; Diplo; Steve Aoki; Retro/Grade; Psycatron; Anthony Remedy; Freaks From Dublin	Afrojack; Crookers; Fake Blood; Alex Metric; Al Gibbs; TEED

– ** artist cancelled attendance after official announcement

== 2012 hiatus ==
On 21 December 2011, MCD posted a short notice on the Oxegen website confirming rumours that Oxegen 2012 had been cancelled. The statement read as follows: "OXEGEN, like Glastonbury, is taking a year off in 2012 and will be back July 2013. Wishing everyone a very Happy Christmas & peaceful New Year. Keep Rockin' in 2012 and we will see you in 2013! Your Oxegen Team".

The cancellation was expected to damage the local economy in Kildare. Media described the Dublin leg of The Stone Roses Reunion Tour, held in Phoenix Park on 5 July 2012, as a replacement for the year's lack of Oxegen. A Swedish House Mafia concert at the same venue two days later also drew comparisons with the festival, with "Oxegen-like behaviour" culminating in a number of random unprovoked attacks and concerns that "The off-stage events which have dominated the news agenda since the Swedish House Mafia show [...] will forevermore be associated with stabbings and suspected drug deaths rather than the music."

== 2013 festival ==
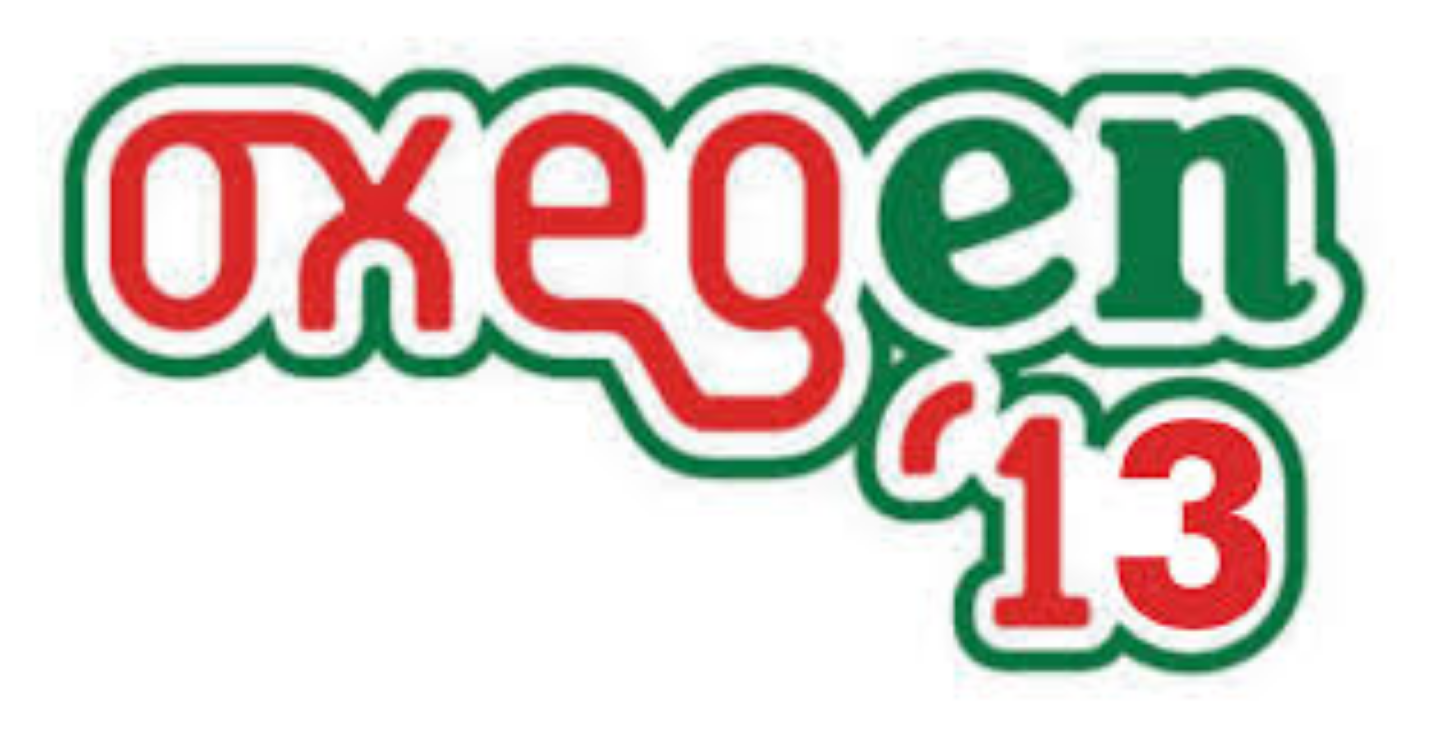

MCD chief Denis Desmond revealed, on the official Oxegen website in April 2013, the news that Oxegen would return to the Irish festival line-up that summer following a one-year hiatus.

The festival took place in its usual home of Punchestown Racecourse in Kildare, and took place from 2–4 August 2013. On 22 April an announcement was made to confirm the first set of acts playing. Confirmed were Calvin Harris, Rizzle Kicks, Jack Beats, Duke Dumont, Example, Pitbull, Nero. On 24 April David Guetta was announced as one of the headline acts. The line-up was heavily criticized for having no guitar bands. The actual announcement posts were deleted on the same day as negative feedback was so heavy that festival promoters urged MCD to remove it to avoid embarrassment. It is thought that ticket sales were poor, and this may have been the last time MCD attend the festival. Revellers noted that there were 38 bands above this years headliners in 2010.

== See also ==
- List of historic rock festivals
- Longitude Festival
- Electric Picnic
