= The Revs =

Background information
- Origin: Kilcar, County Donegal, Ireland
- Genres: Indie rock Punk rock
- Years active: 1999 - 2007
- Labels: Haldern Pop, Evelyn
- Members: Rory Gallagher; John McIntyre; Michael O'Donnell
- Website: http://www.myspace.com/sver

The Revs are an indie rock band from Kilcar, County Donegal in Ireland. The group consisted of three childhood friends: Rory Gallagher (named after the famous blues guitarist Rory Gallagher and who had previously released the album 20th Century at the age of 18) on bass guitar and vocals, John McIntyre (guitar, vocals) and Michael O' Donnell (drums, percussion).

== History ==
The Revs formed on the eve of the 2000 millennium with an aim to "change the face of Irish music".

The Revs released their debut "Sonictonic" in 2002, a live album recorded at Temple Bar Music Centre in Dublin (Now the Button Factory). Early on, the band's music courted controversy with its attacks on manufactured pop; for example, the group's single "Louis Walsh" targeted Louis Walsh (the svengali behind Westlife and Boyzone amongst others).

They followed this up with the stand-alone singles "Tuesday, Monday" and "Loaded" before the debut studio album Suck in February 2003. This album (recorded in Trackmix Studios, Clonsilla, Dublin) entered the charts gaining them many new fans, as well as pleasing the ones who had assembled en masse due to their constant touring across Ireland and the UK. The songs are an eclectic mix of punk rock, surf guitars, pop-rock and indie, similar to Pixies, Radiohead and Muse, with paranoid lyrics (influenced by Bill Hicks) expressing their conflicting love and distaste with the world.They were voted 3rd in the Hot Press readers poll behind U2 and The Frames in 2003. They are one of the few Irish bands to ever play in Slane Castle. In March 2004, they had a top 30 hit in Australia with the single "Death of a Dj". They embarked on a short two-week coast to coast tour and received rave reviews from the Australian music press.

Taking a lengthy break during which they decided upon a change of direction, wrote dozens of songs and roadtested them in small venues around Ireland, they returned in November 2004 with a sample of the music that was to come: a new single "Broken?", backed with "Ode to Saint Susie, Patron Saint Of Supermarkets". They now sounded more like The Flaming Lips, Big Star or The Smiths, with their love of Radiohead still shining through, and this release confused the public who had dismissed them. During the months that opened up 2005, they recorded their third album, The Revs, in Malmö, Sweden, with Tore Johansson–the producer behind Franz Ferdinand and The Cardigans.

This LP was released on 14 October 2005, following the single "Time Slippin'" in September. Despite being their most critically acclaimed release to date, it was their least commercially successful album in Ireland. A successful European tour of Germany, the Netherlands, Belgium and France followed in 2006, alongside the well received European release of The Revs. Two songs from the band's self-titled album - "Take It All Back" and "Streets" - appeared on the soundtrack of the blockbuster movie P.S. I Love You.

In January 2007, Gallagher announced on the band's official forum that the Revs were taking a break of "indefinite" length. In July 2007, the band played a short tour of Ireland, believed to have been their last.

From 2001 to 2006 The Revs had released 3 albums, 7 singles and 2 EPs.

Rory Gallagher released a solo album in September 2008 called God Bless The Big Bang. It received some great press reaction in Ireland with Hotpress magazine declaring it a "Triumphant return, 4 Stars" but it failed to chart. However the industry response helped him to gain the support slot for Britpop/mod legends Ocean Colour Scene on their 2009 comeback tour.

In 2010, Gallagher had a strange online hit which was in a fact a leaked comedy demo recording called "Ryanair Blues". It broke through to national daytime radio in Ireland in November 2010 and went to number 1 in the download charts the following day as it was released for free. It did not feature on his forthcoming solo album, released in 2012.

Gallagher then released four new singles to iTunes in 2011 under the name of "Rory and the Island" . They all charted in the top 30 in Ireland, with "Colours" reaching number 8. Gallagher played solo acoustic gigs at most of the top Irish festivals that summer 2011 including the Electric Picnic.

Rory and the island had another iTunes top ten hit in June 2012 with "Boys in Green 2012" a song for the Rep. of Ireland football team recorded with Sharon Shannon for the European championships, It featured as a bonus track on the limited edition of the album "Auntie Depressant and Uncle Hope" released a fortnight later. Rory and the island had a massive cult hit with Jimmy's Winning Matches in late 2012 written in support of the Donegal football team in the All-Ireland Senior Football Championship.

John McIntyre and his wife Zoe Conway received rave reviews for their new recordings and live gigs in traditional Irish music in late 2012.

Rory and the island released an EP called "dingo rush" in 2013, it featured a track called " mad dog coll " which was shortlisted as song of the year by IMRO. it reached number 19 on iTunes ireland in FEB 2013. Rory and the island released an album " Watching the Sun going down" in jan 2016, Five singles from the album charted on iTunes ireland, with " Peace, Love and Ringo Starr" going into the top 20 again. all 3 albums were remastered and released on Spotify the same year.

The Revs played a re-union show in Whelans in Dublin in August 2017. It was a sell out show which led to the band being approached to play a second show.

== Discography ==
=== Albums ===
- SonicTonic (2002) - highest chart position No. 5
- Suck (2003) - highest chart position No.3
- The Revs (2005) - highest chart position No. 25

=== Singles/EPs ===
| Release date | Title | Label | Chart position Ireland |
|---|---|---|---|
| 2001 | "Wired to the Moon" | Treasure Island | 17 |
| 2001 | "Alone With You" | Treasure Island | 14 |
| 2002 | "Tuesday Monday/Turnin' Japanese" | Treasure Island | 2 |
| 2002 | "Loaded" | Treasure Island | 21 |
| 2003 | "Death of a DJ" | Treasure Island | 26 |
| 2004 | "Broken?" | Evelyn | 44 |
| 2005 | "Time Slippin'" | Evelyn/Haldern Pop | no chart |
| 2006 | "Every Monkey" | Haldern Pop | no chart |
