= Witnness =

Irish music festival

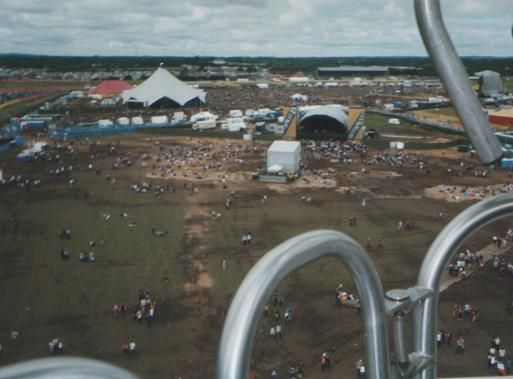
- Genre: Alternative rock; rock
- Dates: First weekend of August (2000–2001); Second weekend of July (2002–2003)
- Locations: County Meath, Ireland (2000–2002); County Kildare, Ireland (2003)
- Years active: 2000–2003

Witnness was an Irish music festival, sponsored by Guinness, which ran for four consecutive summers from 2000 to 2003. Originally it was held at Fairyhouse Racecourse in County Meath, but it was moved to Athy in County Kildare for its final year.

In 2004, Guinness were replaced by Heineken as sponsors, and the festival continued as before at Punchestown, changing its name to Oxegen.

== 2000 Festival ==
The 2000 festival was the first Witnness festival to be held. It took place on 5 and 6 August 2000 in Fairyhouse Racecourse in County Meath, Ireland.

The main event was supported by several smaller local gigs in and around Dublin featuring artists playing smaller venues than they would normally play. A promotional Enhanced CD containing music, videos and interactive toys was distributed free of charge in participating clubs and pubs.

The line-up included Travis, Beck, David Gray, Bell X1, Marbles, Paul Weller, Asian Dub Foundation, Johnny Moy, Badly Drawn Boy, The Undertones, Kíla, Paddy Casey, Happy Mondays, Death in Vegas, Hothouse Flowers, Watercress, Leftfield, Toploader, Wilt, All Saints, and Therapy?.

== 2001 Festival ==
The 2001 festival again took place in Fairyhouse on 4 and 5 August 2001. Amongst the bands playing were Muse, Fun Lovin' Criminals, Faithless and The Avalanches.

Also on the line-up were Ash, Placebo, Shack, The Keds, The Charlatans, Stereophonics, Neil Finn, The Waterboys, Evan Dando, Texas, Frank Black, Snow Patrol, Alabama 3, Turn, The Frames, Proud Mary, Relish, The White Stripes, James, Clinic, Teenage Fanclub, Super Furry Animals and David Kitt.

== 2002 Festival ==
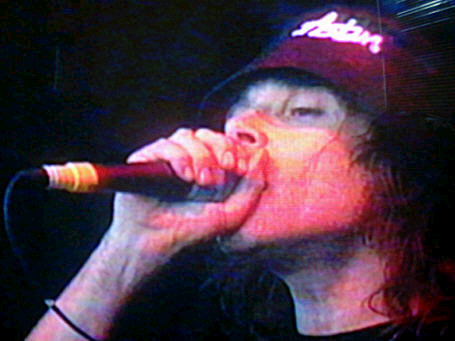
Ian Brown performing at Witnness in 2002.

The 2002 festival was moved from August to 13 and 14 July at Fairyhouse Racecourse. The festival was closed out on Sunday night by headliners Oasis and Saturday night was headlined by The Prodigy. The line-up included The Chemical Brothers, 2 Many DJ's, Basement Jaxx, The Dandy Warhols, Badly Drawn Boy, Green Day, The Foo Fighters, Sonic Youth, Mercury Rev, No Doubt, Damien Rice, Mogwai, The Redneck Manifesto, The Frames, Lemon Jelly, Massive Attack, The Polyphonic Spree, The Coral, Primal Scream, Nina Hynes, Jimmy Eat World, The Hives, The Devlins, Turn, The Libertines, Hoobastank, Spiritualized, The Jimmy Cake, Black Rebel Motorcycle Club, Gemma Hayes, Idlewild, Ian Brown, Rival Schools, Cooper Temple Clause, Dogs Die In Hot Cars, The Beta Band, Leaves, Starsailor and David Kitt.

== 2003 Festival ==
The last Witnness festival took place across five stages in a new venue, Punchestown Racecourse in County Kildare, on 12 and 13 July 2003. Tickets went on-sale Friday 11 April at 8 am and cost €59.50 (for one day), €109.50 (for both days) and €130.50 (for both days plus camping).

Saturday was headlined by Coldplay and also featured Sugababes, Badly Drawn Boy, Supergrass, Underworld, The Streets, The Coral, The Roots, Death in Vegas, The Complete Stone Roses, Röyksopp, Gemma Hayes, Mogwai, The Thrills, Appleton, Mull Historical Society, Ed Harcourt, The Rapture and many more.

Sunday was headlined by David Gray and Manic Street Preachers and also featured The Cardigans, The Polyphonic Spree, Super Furry Animals, Beth Orton, The Music, The Flaming Lips, Tricky, The Datsuns, Keith Flint, Calexico, The Eighties Matchbox B-Line Disaster, Kings of Leon and Har Mar Superstar. Others to feature included Doves, The Thrills, Turin Brakes, Nightmares on Wax and Damien Rice. The Flaming Lips were stepped up the bill on the Sunday to replace The White Stripes (cancelled due to frontman Jack White suffering a broken hand) and by all accounts delivered a well-received set which included a version of The White Stripes's hit "Seven Nation Army".
