= Humanzi =

Irish rock band

- Origin: Dublin, Ireland
- Genres: Hard rock; rock and roll; punk; electronica
- Years active: 2005–2010
- Past members: Seán Mulrooney; Colm Rutledge; Gary Lonergan; Brian Gallagher

Humanzi were an Irish rock band based in Dublin, Ireland. It consisted of Seán Mulrooney as the main songwriter and vocalist/rhythm guitarist, Colm Rutledge as the lead guitarist, Gary Lonergan as the bassist and Brian Gallagher as the drummer. Several members as well as producers contributed keys work to the albums on instruments ranging from Harmonium to Synthesizer.

== History ==
Humanzi was founded in Dublin by Seán Mulrooney (then Shaun) after his previous band, Listo, split up. The members drew influence from a wide array of music, including many rock bands from the 1960s onwards.

Their success grew significantly over their years, especially after their debut album, Tremors, they began to earn a sturdy name in Ireland and abroad. However issues with the record industry at the time due to the rise of streaming and internal disputes between members lead to the demise of the band after the release of their second album Kingdom of Ghosts.

== Albums and singles ==
The Band released their debut album Tremors on Fiction/SFR on 24 July 2006. It featured the singles "Fix The Cracks" and "Diet Pills and Magazines". Tremors was produced by Chris Vrenna (Nine Inch Nails) and Garreth Mannix.

They released their single "Bass Balls" from their second album in summer 2009.

The Band's second album, Kingdom of Ghosts, was released on 26 February 2010. It was recorded in East Berlin by Rob Kirwan in Funk Haus.

== Significant appearances ==
=== Festivals ===
Humanzi have opened for and toured with bands including the Foo Fighters, The Strokes, The Pixies, Eagles of Death Metal, the New York Dolls, Dirty Pretty Things, Peaches, and White Rose Movement. Humanzi headlined the New Band Stage on the Sunday night of the Oxegen festival in July 2006, made appearances at Reading and Leeds Festivals, The Wireless Festival, CMJ and were invited to play in New York City for Fader Magazine and also at the Eurosonic Festival in Groningen, the Netherlands.

=== Video games ===
The song "Fix the Cracks" was featured on the Atari video game Test Drive Unlimited, released in 2006.

=== TV ===
TV appearances have included slots on renowned Irish music show Other Voices and The Late Late Show as well as T4 and MTV2's Gonzo.

=== 2007 ===
Having won a Meteor award which they turned down, in 2006 for "Best New Act", Humanzi were nominated in 2007 for "Best Irish Band". 2007 saw the band spend time in Berlin recording their second album, Kingdom of Ghosts.

== Discography ==
=== Studio albums ===
Year	Album details	Peak chart positions	Certifications
Year	Album details	IRL	Certifications
2006	Tremors: Released: 21 July 2006; Label: Fiction/Polydor; Formats: CD, digital download	44	
2010	Kingdom of Ghosts: Released: 26 February 2010; Label: First Born Is Dead Recordings; Formats: CD, Download	—	
"—" denotes a title that did not chart.

=== Singles ===
Year	Title	Peak chart position	Album
Year	Title	IRL	Album
2005	"Fix the Cracks"	33	Tremors
2006	"Long Time Coming"	27	Tremors
2006	"Diet Pills & Magazines"	—	Tremors
2006	"Out on a Wire"	48	Tremors
"—" denotes a title that did not chart.
