= Damien Dempsey discography =

- Studio albums: 10
- Extended plays: 2
- Live albums: 1
- Compilation albums: 1
- Singles: 14
- Video albums: 1

This is the discography of Irish musician Damien Dempsey.

== Albums ==
=== Studio albums ===
Year	Album	Peak chart position	Certifications (sales thresholds)
Year	Album	IRE	Certifications (sales thresholds)
2000	They Don't Teach This Shit in School: Released: 13 March 2000; Label: Zinc	47	
2003	Seize the Day: Released: 16 May 2003; Label: Clear	1	IRE: 2× Platinum
2005	Shots: Released: 11 March 2005; Label: Clear	1	IRE: Platinum
2007	To Hell or Barbados: Released: 1 June 2007; Label: Clear	2	IRE: Platinum
2008	The Rocky Road: Released: 6 June 2008; Label: Clear	2	IRE: Gold
2012	Almighty Love: Released: 28 September 2012; Label: Clear	20	
2017	Soulsun: Released: 26 May 2017; Label: Clear	3	
2018	Union: Released: 30 November 2018; Label: Soulsun	31	
2024	Hold Your Joy: Released: 25 October 2024; Label: Soulsun	3	
2026	Holywell: Released: 26 June 2026; Label: Sony Music Ireland	15	

=== Live albums ===
Year	Album	Peak chart position
Year	Album	IRE
2006	Live at the Olympia: Released: 2 June 2006; Label: Clear	10

=== Compilation albums ===
Year	Album	Peak chart positions
Year	Album	IRE
2006	Sing All Our Cares Away: Released: 5 May 2006; Label: Lamm	—
2014	It's All Good – The Best of Damien Dempsey: Released: February 2014; Label: Clear	1

=== Video albums ===
Year	Album	Peak chart position
Year	Album	IRE
2006	Party On: Live at Vicar Street: Released: 24 October 2008; Label: Sony BMG	1

== EPs ==
- Contender EP (1995)
- Negative Vibes EP (2002)
- No Force on Earth EP (2018)

== Singles ==
Year	Title	Peak chart position	Album
Year	Title	IRE	Album
1997	"Dublin Town"	18	They Don't Teach This Shit in School
2000	"Chillin'"	—	They Don't Teach This Shit in School
2003	"Negative Vibes"	37	Seize the Day
2003	"It's All Good"	28	Seize the Day
2004	"Apple of My Eye"	—	Seize the Day
2005	"St. Patrick's Day"	18	Shots
2005	"Patience"	43	Shots
2005	"Hold Me"	34	Shots
2007	"Your Pretty Smile"	21	To Hell or Barbados
2007	"Kilburn Stroll"	—	To Hell or Barbados
2007	"The City"	—	To Hell or Barbados
2008	"A Rainy Night in Soho"	49	The Rocky Road
2012	"Almighty Love"	—	Almighty Love

=== Featured singles ===
Year	Title	Peak chart position	Album
Year	Title	IRE	Album
2007	"Cutting Down Laws" (with Eoin Coughlan)	—	Blood in Vein
2008	"The Ballad of Ronnie Drew" (with U2, The Dubliners, Kíla and A Band of Bowsies)	1	Non-album singles
2012	"The Rocky Road to Poland" (with Bressie, The Dubliners, and Danny O'Reilly)	1	Non-album singles

== Notable compilation appearances ==
- It's All Bells: Jingle All the Way (2002) - "Fairytale of New York" (with Sinéad O'Connor)
- Even Better Than the Real Thing Vol. 1 (2003) - "I Believe in a Thing Called Love"
- Even Better Than the Real Thing Vol. 3 (2005) - "Sunday Bloody Sunday"
- Ceol '07 (2007) - "Taobh Leis An Muir", an Irish language version of Beside The Sea
- Music of Ireland: Welcome Home (2010) - "Maasai Returns"

== Guest appearances ==
Year	Title	Album
2004	"The Sprinhill Mining Disaster" (with Pauline Scanlon)	Red Colour Sun
2004	"Mise Eire" (with Seanchai & the Unity Squad, Shane MacGowan, Cruncher, Gary Og and Mary Courtney)	Rebel Massive
2005	"It's All Good" (with Sinéad O'Connor)	Collaborations
2005	"Norwegian Wood" (with Sharon Shannon)	The Collection 1990-2005
2005	"Courtin' in the Kitchen" (with Sharon Shannon, Dessie O'Halloran and Mundy)	The Collection 1990-2005
2007	"Cutting Down Laws" (with Eoin Coughlan)	Blood in Vein
2008	"The Ballad of Ronnie Drew" (with U2, The Dubliners, Kíla and A Band of Bowsies)	Non-album single
2008	"A Rainy Night in Soho" (with Ronnie Drew)	The Last Session: A Fond Farewell
2009	"Dirty Windscreens" (with Sydney City Trash)	Terror Australis
2009	"The West's Awake" (with Lumiere)	Lumiere
2013	"You Don't Have To" (with John Grant)	John Grant Gets Schooled (EP)
