= Laura Izibor discography =

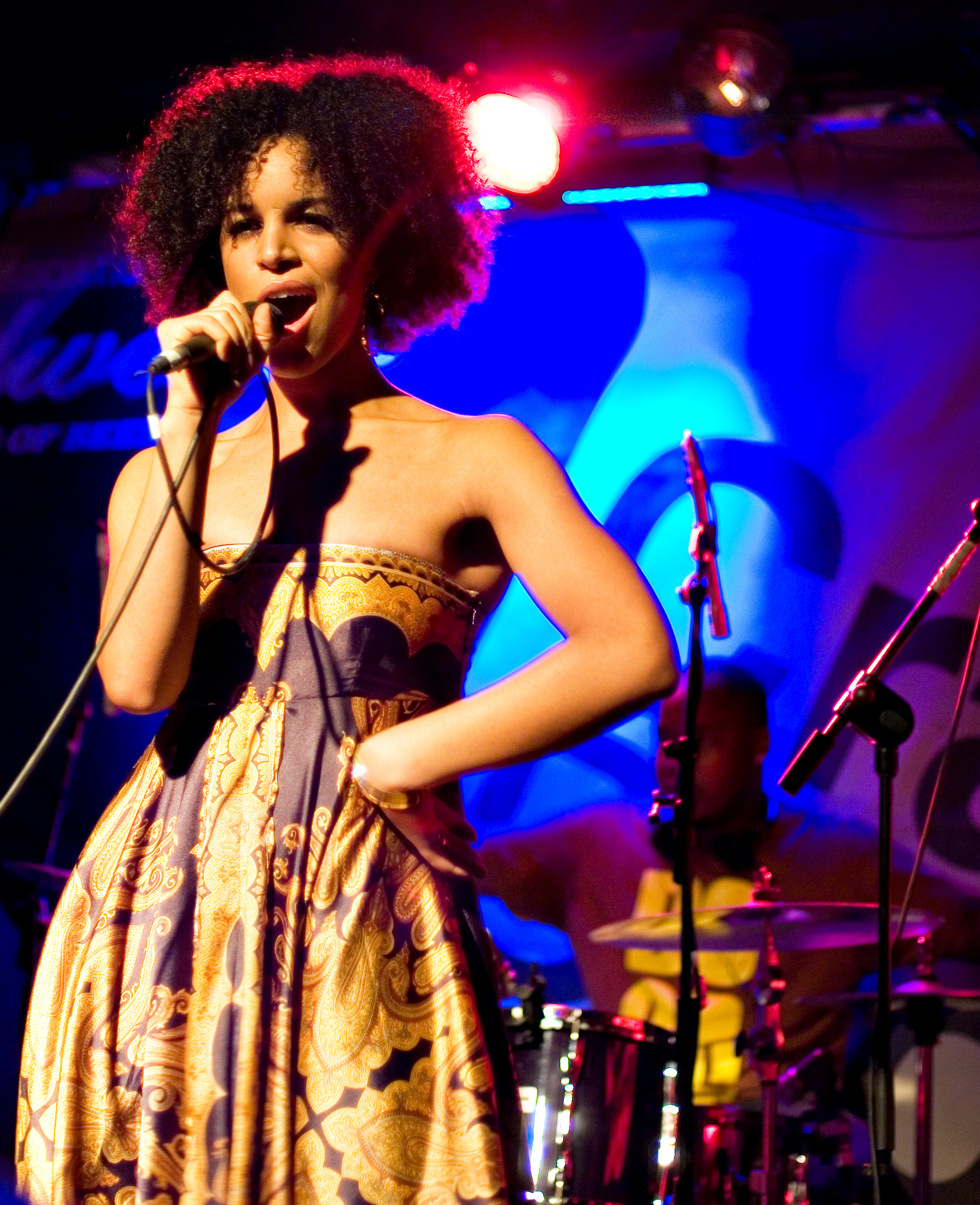
- Laura Izibor performing in Dublin, Ireland in 2008
- Studio albums: 1
- EPs: 3
- Singles: 4
- Music videos: 3
- Collaborations: 1
- Other appearances: 5

The discography of Laura Izibor, an Irish R&B musician, recording artist and producer, consists of one studio album, three extended plays, four singles and three music videos. Born and raised in Dublin, Izibor began writing songs as a 13-year-old and in 2003, she won a songwriting competition organised by Raidió Teilifís Éireann (RTÉ). Her winning song, "Compatible", received heavy airplay on RTÉ 2fm and was the basis of a short documentary film broadcast on national television. Aged 17, Izibor signed to Jive Records and dropped out of school to record her debut studio album; however, after a dispute with the record label, she signed with Atlantic Records and relocated to New York City, United States to complete the recording. Due to long-term recording sessions in Ireland and the US, Izibor released two EPs, Live from Crawdaddy, Dublin (2007) and iTunes Festival: London 2008 (2008), on Atlantic and was featured on various film soundtracks. Let the Truth Be Told, her debut studio album, was released in 2009 after a four-year production process. The album, and its four singles, received widespread critical acclaim and charted in Ireland, the United Kingdom, the US, France, Japan and the Netherlands. Three of the album's singles—"From My Heart to Yours", "Don't Stay" and "If Tonight is My Last"—placed in the US Billboard Hot R&B/Hip-Hop Songs chart. Let the Truth Be Told was later nominated for the 2009 Choice Music Prize and earned Izibor a BET Award nomination for Best UK/Irish Act.

In August 2012, Izibor released a three-track EP The Brooklyn Sessions, Vol. 1, which contained new material. A month earlier, she announced in Metromix that her second studio album, Love, Learn, Live, which "has a little more attitude", was in production and due for release in 2012. As of September 2019, the album remains unreleased.

== Albums ==
=== Studio albums ===
List of studio albums, with selected chart positions
Title	Album details	Peak chart positions					
Title	Album details	IRL	FRA	JPN	NLD	UK	US
Let the Truth Be Told	Released: 8 May 2009 (IRL); Label: Atlantic (7567-89899-2); Formats: CD, DD	2	60	100	61	100	27

== Extended plays ==
List of extended plays
Title	Album details
Live from Crawdaddy, Dublin	Released: 18 September 2007 (IRL); Label: Atlantic; Format: DD
iTunes Festival: London 2008	Released: 18 July 2008 (IRL); Label: Atlantic; Format: DD
The Brooklyn Sessions, Vol. 1	Released: 7 August 2012 (IRL); Label: Atlantic; Format: DD

== Singles ==
List of singles, with selected chart positions
Single	Year	Peak chart positions			Album
Single	Year	IRL	UK	US R&B	Album
"From My Heart to Yours"	2008	—	—	25	Let the Truth Be Told
"Shine"	2009	21	122	—	Let the Truth Be Told
"Don't Stay"	2009	—	—	58	Let the Truth Be Told
"If Tonight is My Last"	2009	—	—	76	Let the Truth Be Told
"—" denotes a release that did not chart.

== Music videos ==
List of music videos, with directors
Title	Year	Director	Ref.
"From My Heart to Yours"	2008	David Broad	
"Shine"	2009	Liz Friedlander	
"Don't Stay"	2009	Noble Jones	

== Collaborations ==
List of collaborations with other artists
Title	Year	Album	Ref.
"Baby Baby" (Miho Fukuhara featuring Laura Izibor)	2010	Music is My Life	

== Other appearances ==
List of soundtrack and compilation appearances
Title	Year	Album	Ref.
"Carousel"	2007	P.S. I Love You: Music From the Motion Picture	
"Mmm..."	2007	Why Did I Get Married?: Music From and Inspired by the Original Motion Picture	
"What More Can They Do"	2010	For Colored Girls: Music From and Inspired by the Original Motion Picture Soundtrack	
"Shine"	2010	When in Rome: Music From the Original Motion Picture Soundtrack	
"If Tonight Is My Last"	2011	Live From the Artists Den: Season Three	
