= Sing All Our Cares Away =

Compilation album by Damien Dempsey
- Released: 5 May 2006 (Germany)
- Genre: Singer-songwriter, folk rock, Irish, reggae
- Label: Lamm Records

Sing All Our Cares Away is a compilation album by Irish singer-songwriter Damien Dempsey. It was released in Germany on 5 May 2006 and brings together tracks from his Seize the Day and Shots albums.

== Track listing ==
No.	Title	Length
1.	"Sing All Our Cares Away"
2.	"Not On Your Own Tonight"
3.	"Factories"
4.	"Ghosts Of Overdoses"
5.	"Celtic Tiger"
6.	"It's All Good"
7.	"Party On"
8.	"Patience"
9.	"Negative Vibes"
10.	"Apple of My Eye"
11.	"Spraypaint Backalley"
