= Giovanni Di Stefano (fraudster) =

British businessman and fraudster

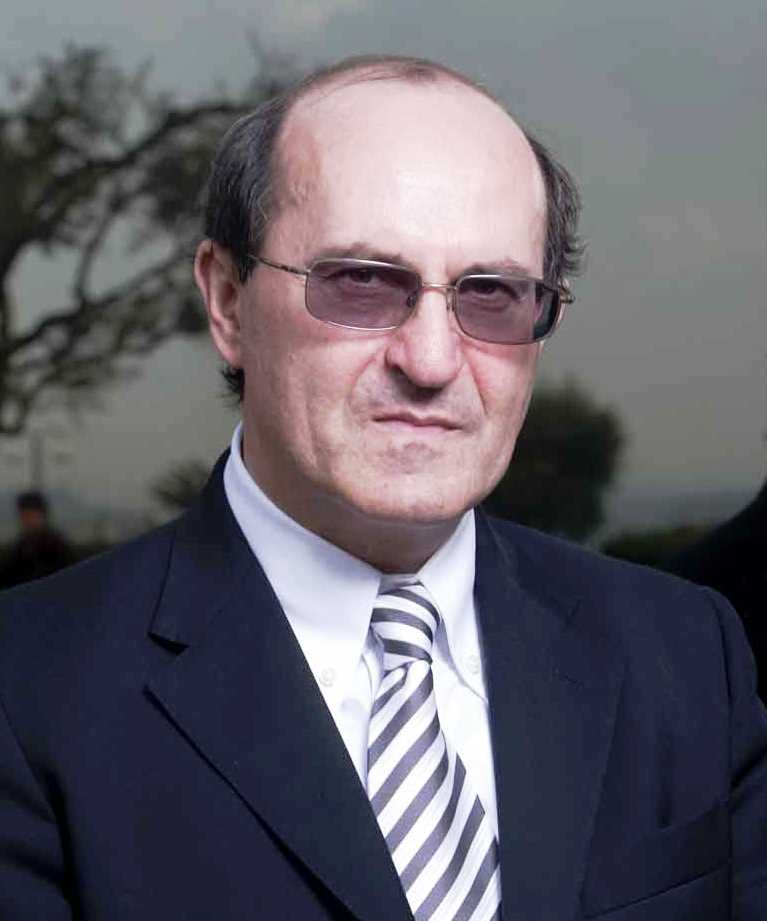
Di Stefano in 2009

Giovanni Di Stefano (born 1955 or 1956 (age 70–71)) is an Italian-British businessman and convicted fraudster. He has been involved in legal cases for high-profile and notorious defendants worldwide. He has no legal qualifications, is barred from working in law in the UK, and is not registered to work as an advocate in the UK or Italy. He has been referred to as "The Devil's Advocate" for his claimed advocacy on behalf of such notorious clients as Saddam Hussein and Slobodan Milošević. He was also a business associate of Željko Ražnatović, a Serbian paramilitary leader and indicted war criminal.

He has been convicted four times in Ireland and the United Kingdom of fraud and related criminal offences, serving a total of eight and a half years for convictions between 1975 and the late 1980s. He was described by a judge as "one of life's great swindlers". His most recent conviction was in March 2013 when he was sentenced to 14 years' imprisonment after being found guilty or pleading guilty to 27 charges including deception, fraud and money laundering between 2001 and 2011 related to "tricking people into thinking he was a bona fide legal professional". He was released in April 2023.

== Life and career ==
Di Stefano was born in the small town of Petrella Tifernina in Molise, southern Italy. When his father emigrated to the UK to work in a shoe factory, Giovanni and his mother followed, settling in Irchester, Northamptonshire, when Giovanni was six years old. He then went on to study at Wollaston Secondary Modern School and later spent one year at Wellingborough Grammar School (which later became Wrenn School). In his 1986 fraud trial and in his entry in Marquis Who's Who, he claimed that he had obtained a PhD in law from Cambridge University around this time, but this claim was later found to be without foundation. In his 20s, he claimed to have 'earned a fortune importing videotapes' from Hong Kong. Despite living much of his early life in England, he considered himself an Italian. During this time at school, he was often called John, the English equivalent of Giovanni.

Di Stefano lived in Britain until 1989. He then moved to several locations: Los Angeles between 1989 and 1992. In 1992, his bid to buy the MGM movie studios failed, and he fled to Yugoslavia because that country's breakup had made it a war zone and nobody would look for him there. In Yugoslavia, he became a friend of its then-president Slobodan Milošević who granted him Yugoslav nationality with a Yugoslavian passport. Additionally, he became a spokesman, a business partner, and a personal legal representative of the Serbian warlord Arkan. He also served as general in the Serb Volunteer Guard (Arkan's Tigers), although he never fought. He stayed in Serbia until 1999; and later Italy from 1999 to 2011, while working in the UK as a lawyer. In 2011, he was arrested and extradited to the UK because he lacked the legal requisites necessary to work as a lawyer in the UK. In 2013, he was sentenced to 14 years of imprisonment in a UK prison.

=== Legal career ===
Di Stefano had an office in Rome, the Studio Legale Internazionale. He is well documented, in the UK media, for defending "some of the country's most notorious villains". He once commented that he would "...defend Adolf Hitler or Satan." He says he "defends the indefensible", and his autobiography is called Defending the Indefensible. When asked about his motivation, he replied, "No one's ever asked, 'Does Satan have a case? Does he have a good case?'"

The Scotsman described Di Stefano as a "colourful and often controversial lawyer"; The Guardian has called him "surely the only man in the world to claim the personal friendship of Saddam Hussein and the personal enmity of Delia Smith", after a failed bid to buy Norwich City F.C.

Di Stefano used the Italian title "avvocato" ("advocate", analogous to an English lawyer) on his business card, and misled clients and the courts into believing that he was a qualified lawyer. On 27 March 2013, he was convicted on 25 charges including deception, fraud and money laundering between 2001 and 2011 by a jury at Southwark Crown Court in London. During the trial he had told the court of his links to Robert Mugabe, Osama bin Laden, and Saddam Hussein (whom he described as a "nice guy") and his "friendship" with the daughter of Slobodan Milošević.

He took up the avvocato title after a 2002 High Court ruling which allowed him to represent Nicholas van Hoogstraten in his manslaughter appeal. In evidence, he admitted that he was not a qualified lawyer but that he only realised this "in hindsight" .

Di Stefano attracted clients after a BBC documentary entitled "Notorious" (see below); these included Paul Bush, jailed for life in 2003 for kidnapping and murder, whose wife paid £20,000 for legal services and, with others, £100,000 to di Stefano to secure bail for her husband – the money was received before Bush learned there was never any possibility of bail. Much of the money was never returned. Cocaine smuggler Laurent Penchef's parents paid di Stefano €10,000 in June 2005 for legal services, specifically CCRC and advice regarding repatriation to France; however, he was never given clear advice about how his 18-year jail sentence would be implemented in France, and no work was done taking his case to the CCRC. The money was sent to a bank in Rome by Penchef's parents, but prosecutor David Aaronberg QC said: "Mr Di Stefano did little or nothing to assist." "He was no more a qualified lawyer than he was a surgeon qualified to perform surgery or pilot qualified to fly an aeroplane", said Mr Aaronberg.

=== Notable claims ===
Notable people whom Giovanni Di Stefano has claimed to represent include:

- Serial killer Harold Shipman The Irish Independent commented "The law firm that represented Shipman later denied that di Stefano had acted for its client."
- Former President of Iraq Saddam Hussein; (only as part of his legal team in 2004, and only before the trial began (Note: Di Stefano said in 2004 that he was part of the legal team, but in August 2005 all lawyers except Khalil al-Duleimi were fired. The trial of Saddam Hussein started in October 2005, and Al-Duleimi represented Saddam in exclusive during all the duration the trial Saddam family slims defence team, BBC, 8 August 2005))
- Close associate of Hussein Tariq Aziz;
- Jeremy Bamber, convicted of the White House Farm murders;
- Businessman and criminal Nicholas van Hoogstraten;
- Irish gangsters Patrick Holland and John Gilligan;
- Notorious prisoner Charles Bronson;
- Iraqi Ba’athist politician and military commander Ali Hassan al-Majid (known as Chemical Ali, whose death sentence Di Stefano tried, but failed, to overturn);
- Pop singer and serial sex-offender Gary Glitter;
- Ian Brady, one of the Moors murderers;
- Ian Strachan, one of the defendants in the 2007 royal blackmail plot.

He has written to the Parole Board requesting Great Train Robbery participant Ronnie Biggs's release on compassionate grounds.

In 2002, he managed to overturn a manslaughter conviction against Hoogstraten, getting him released from prison.

In January 2004, Di Stefano again came to fame when he claimed in television interviews to be acting for serial killer Harold Shipman. However, Shipman's lawyer said that Shipman had rejected Di Stefano's offer in May 2003, and that neither he nor any member of Shipman's family believed that Di Stefano was acting for Shipman. This, and an incident in a 2004 trial of John Palmer, prompted an investigation into Di Stefano's qualifications as lawyer (see "personal legal history" section).

On 17 March 2007, Di Stefano wrote to Lord Goldsmith (at that time the Attorney General for England and Wales) asking for leave to prosecute Judge Rauf Rashid Abd al-Rahman, who had sentenced Saddam Hussein, under the Geneva Conventions Act 1957. On 14 January 2008, Di Stefano was reported as saying "Hurried justice is no justice", after a claimed UK client, who had won £1million in the National Lottery, failed to attend court as a witness in an assault case. Judge Christopher Elwen jailed her for 14 days anyway.

In January 2007, Di Stefano asked the International Criminal Court to make a full investigation of the Al-Dujail trials of Saddam Hussein's half-brother Barzan Ibrahim al-Tikriti and Iraq's judiciary head Awad Hamed al-Bandar. Di Stefano circulated a note handwritten by Barzan where he explains that he wasn't responsible for the killings at Dujail for which he was sentenced to death.

In October 2007, he complained that the investigation of Blackwater's civilian deaths on Iraq was unjust because they were forced to operate in climate and conditions that forced them to shoot first and ask questions later when they came under attack.

Also in October 2007, he argued that Iraqi officials had to accept a pardon application for Ali Hassan al-Majid (Chemical Ali) because the 30-day execution window set the trial had passed. The US military later refused to release Ali for his execution until the legal questions were answered. Ali was sentenced to death again in February 2008 for different charges. The execution was further delayed in December 2008 as a new trial was opened against him with further charges. Ali was executed on 25 January 2010, fulfilling eight death sentences.

In October 2007, Di Stefano asked the British Home Secretary for posthumous pardon of Hawley Harvey Crippen, who had been hanged for murder in 1910, on the basis of supposed new forensic evidence indicating that the body found was not that of his wife, and a letter from his wife that was sent after the date of the alleged murder and was never presented on the trial, and that he never murdered her. The request was filed on behalf of the doctor's last living relative.

On 15 January 2008, Di Stefano said that he knew of a sixth victim of Moors murderers Ian Brady and Myra Hindley called Jennifer Tighe. He said he had a photo of her, and intended to speak to Brady to see if the killer would confess to this latest allegation. On 21 January 2008, Greater Manchester Police (GMP) issued a statement saying that Jennifer Tighe was in fact alive and that "Mr Di Stefano has previously made claims regarding the Moors murders in the media but has not provided any detail to Greater Manchester Police." Di Stefano invited GMP to interview his client and to provide proper evidence that Tighe was still alive.

Moors murderer Ian Brady had been force-fed at a top security hospital since he started a hunger strike in September 1999. In September 2007, Brady applied via Di Stefano to be moved to a conventional jail where he intended to starve himself to death. Later, in November 2008, when Brady was still being force-fed, Giovanni accused the state of legally starving Brady to death by not giving him enough food. In 2009–2010, Di Stefano made appeals to move him to a Scottish prison so he can die there, a move that the Scottish government strongly opposed.

In September 2009, acting in the name of Manuel Noriega, Di Stefano presented an appeal to French president Nicolas Sarkozy, saying the ruling against Noriega had been incorrectly made in absentia. (Note: The appeal was rejected because Noriega has the right to request a new trial the moment he returns to France, and indults could only be awarded when a definitive ruling has been made.)

In May 2010, he made an appeal on behalf of Benguit Omar, saying that he was wrongly convicted for the murder of Jong-Ok Shin.

In January 2011, Di Stefano reported that he had asked for Charles Manson's permission to represent him, in an application to review his trial based upon a violation of the 6th Amendment and a legal argument that had not been raised during Manson's trial, although he had still to get his reply. Around 26 January 2011, Di Stefano claimed to have filed an application with the Inter-American Commission on Human Rights on behalf of Manson claiming the same violations.

=== Personal legal history ===
Di Stefano was arrested in June 1984 and charged with fraud before being released on bail. He was again arrested in August of that year and refused bail. In 1986, Di Stefano was tried for conspiracy to obtain property by deception and fraudulent trading, and was convicted after a 78-day trial, jailed for five years, and prohibited from being a company director for 10 years; of a total of 11 fraud counts, he was convicted of three counts and acquitted of eight.

In the ruling, the judge called him "one of nature's fraudsters... a swindler without scruple or conscience" and said he was "motivated by personal greed and pretension." Court records show that Di Stefano's only attempt to appeal against the conviction was dismissed in 1987 and further records published in 2005 showed that he served the full sentence.

The Lord Justice of Appeal Stephen Brown said "[the trial] revealed a very deep and wide measure of fraudulent behaviour. This was a man who was undoubtedly seeking to operate a financial fraud wherever he was able to induce people to succumb to representations skilfully made in the form of bogus financial documents." Di Stefano had publicly claimed that his 1987 appeal was successful, until a copy of the failed appeal was made public in 2004 by Rosie Cowan of The Independent. Di Stefano claimed that he had taken legal action in Italian courts of law against Cowan and against Martin Hannan of Scotland on Sunday, but the legal departments of their newspapers said that had no knowledge of any legal action started by Di Stefano against them.

He also unsuccessfully appealed in 1989 to the European Commission of Human Rights alleging that his arrest violated the European Convention on Human Rights. Di Stefano claimed in a BBC article that the conviction was quashed on a second appeal in 1988 and that "a sense of injustice remains, making each victory against the system a sweet revenge."

According to The Guardian and the Irish Independent, he had already served a six-month sentence for fraud and false pretenses in 1975 in Ireland, and a three-year sentence for obtaining property by deception and other charges in 1976 in the UK. Di Stefano insists that these convictions were those of a different person, called "John" instead of "Giovanni", although they share the same surname, birthday and birthplace. According to The New Zealand Herald, Di Stefano had already denied being the "John Di Stefano" who had been convicted in 1986, but, also according to the New Zealand Herald, the New Zealand police managed to verify that they were the same person by comparing his fingerprints. Di Stefano denies that he was ever deported or that his fingerprints were ever taken.

In 1990, a Solicitors' Disciplinary Tribunal ruled that Di Stefano could not be employed by any solicitor in England or Wales without permission from the Law Society, because of his criminal record, although he could still contract a solicitor to act on his name.

In 1990, Giovanni Di Stefano travelled to New Zealand, where he made several multimillion-dollar bids on property on behalf of a Beverly Hills-based company. The authorities discovered that he had not disclosed a conviction in England in 1986, declared him a prohibited immigrant, and he was subsequently returned to his country of origin.

In 1991 or 1992, he moved to Yugoslavia, where he received the Yugoslavian citizenship and passport by personal authorisation of president Slobodan Milošević. The address listed in his passport was Tolstojeva 32, Belgrade, right next to Milošević's official residence; however, he lived further away, at the luxurious Genex apartments. According to The Scotsman and Irish Independent, Di Stefano was moving to a country with no extradition treaty with the UK, to escape a warrant for fraud charges.

Around 1992, while trying to buy the MGM film studio, the United States Immigration and Naturalization Service deported him from the United States because of a fraud conviction in the UK in 1986. Months later he applied for a non-immigrant visa for re-entry, and was told that he needed a waiver of grounds of inadmissibility to be eligible. The waiver application was denied by the federal agency, causing the visa to also be denied. In 1993, he appealed to a United States District Court, which ruled that it lacked jurisdiction to review the denial of a waiver application. In 1995, the United States Court of Appeals for the Ninth Circuit affirmed the judgment of the district court, ruling that Di Stefano did not have standing to challenge the waiver denial under the Immigration and Nationality Act.

In November 1999, Di Stefano was arrested in Rome and extradited to Britain to be tried for fraud charges in the insolvency in 1991 of five hotels in the English Midlands and a company called Sandhurst Assets. British investigators recognised his name when newspapers reported his bids for Dundee football club and for Ellington Colliery, and acted on a 1991 warrant. In June 2001, after Di Stefano had spent 18 months in jail, a judge ruled that he couldn't be tried because too much time had passed since the alleged offences. During his stay in Rebibbia prison, his friend Arkan was assassinated and his other friend Milošević was jailed shortly before he was released; Di Stefano claims that it was all part of a conspiracy to isolate Milošević from his most trusted adviser.

In 2002, the Governor of HM Prison Belmarsh barred Di Stefano's access to a client in prison, Nicholas van Hoogstraten. The restriction was appealed to the High Court of Justice in R (Van Hoogstraten) v Governor of Belmarsh Prison which ruled against the prison governor.

The decision held that the governor's challenge to Di Stefano's credentials was not filed in a timely manner, and that some evidence suggested Di Stefano was an Italian lawyer and that Italian lawyers, as a rule, were permitted visitation in British prisons as European lawyers. The justice further ruled that since denying Di Stefano's visits to the prisoner would cause severe prejudice to the client's legal defence, he could not be denied that right until a timely and successful challenge was made. (Note: The right of a qualified European Union lawyer to practise in a country other than their country of origin was, until 1 July 2007, governed by the provisions of the (United Kingdom) European Communities (Services of Lawyers) Order 1978 (SI 1978/1910) (Amended 2004).) In spite of these problems, he managed gain the release Hoogstraten from prison in 2004 (see "notable people" section). In November, the Higher court made a different ruling for a different prison, this time saying that Di Stefano had failed to provide adequate credentials, and preventing him from visiting John Palmer in prison.

In December 2003, Di Stefano was featured in a BBC documentary series called Notorious, covering four entrepreneurs that had obtained their fortunes via controversial means; his chapter was called Devil's Advocate. In the documentary, he said that Hitler would have never been convicted for killing Jews, thus enraging the Jewish community. At that time, Di Stefano was trying to become director of Dundee FC, and the fans of the club were also outraged because he was wearing a Dundee pullover while making those statements. He also boasted of his friendship with Saddam Hussein and with Serbian warlord Arkan.

In January 2004, The Guardian and the Daily Record reported that Di Stefano's legal qualifications were under investigation by the British police and the Law Society since the spring of 2003, to see if he had misrepresented himself as an accredited solicitor, in violation of Solicitors Act 1974.

As a result of the investigation he was eventually arrested in 2011 in Spain (see paragraph below). The Law Society declared that he was "not a solicitor, or a registered foreign lawyer, or a registered European lawyer", and that they were unable to verify either his legal qualifications or his status as a foreign lawyer despite going to considerable lengths, and despite asking Di Stefano himself for the information. The Law Society of Scotland and the Ordine Degli Avvocati of Rome have also said that he is not a registered solicitor. His name does not appear in Italy's national lawyers' register. Di Stefano claims that he does not need to register with either the Law Society nor with any Italian bar association in order to practise in the UK, a claim that is rejected by the Law Society.

As of 2004, Di Stefano could not represent his clients directly, and he had to represent them through Paul Martin & Co, a firm associated with his legal firm Studio Legale Internazionale that acts as his agent. Alistair Cooke, co-director of the BBC series that made a documentary about Di Stefano said "(...) We witnessed him in court, but he never actually stands up and pretends to be a lawyer. He assembles a legal team and acts as a middle man, whispering in lawyers' ears as they act on behalf of clients. He knows a lot of criminals and introduces them to his legal teams who get them off on technicalities or help them retain their assets."

In March 2006, Ireland Chief Justice Murray told Di Stefano that he would have to provide proof of his legal qualifications before he could act for Patrick 'Dutchy' Holland and be his legal representative, and he eventually ruled that Di Stefano had failed to provide any credential.

Di Stefano sued Murray for the negative remarks made about him during the case, but he later dropped his complaint, saying that he did not want to harm a "great jurist" just to win a case.

English libel law changed with the Defamation Act 2013, reducing the potential for abuse to exert a chilling effect.

=== Arrest and trial ===
Di Stefano was arrested in Palma, Majorca, in Spain on 14 February 2011 on a European Arrest Warrant issued by the British authorities. According to the City of London Police, the warrant had been issued in January 2011 "on matters relating to fraud, theft and money laundering". The arrest was the outcome of a lengthy investigation by the City of London Police's economic crime directorate. According to a statement by the Spanish Interior Ministry, quoting the arrest warrant, Di Stefano was accused of having earned large sums of money in the UK between 2004 and 2009 without being licensed to practise law in that country. The ministry said that he was facing 18 charges for which he could receive a maximum 75 years in prison. Di Stefano voluntarily accepted his extradition to the UK, and he was released without bail until the extradition date, with no passport and with the obligation of going to the judge every few days and communicating any residency change. Di Stefano claimed it was a political trial, prepared after he said that Tony Blair should be judged by his role in the Iraq war.

On 25 August, Westminster Magistrates' Court referred the case involving 18 charges of fraud to Southwark Crown Court for a hearing on 30 September. After the hearing, Di Stefano was released on bail, pending trial on 14 January 2013.

In July 2011, Di Stefano announced that he was launching News of the World Online, a website with a masthead logo similar to that of the recently closed News of the World newspaper. On 23 March 2012, News International, the paper's former publisher, sued Di Stefano for violating its trademark.

Subsequently, in a Press Complaints Commission case relating to a Sunday Mail article about a YouTube video posted by Tricia Walsh-Smith stating "that he had taken £100,000 from the individual who had posted the online video". The Sunday Mail agreed to print a statement saying "Giovanni Di Stefano has denied ripping off Tricia Walsh-Smith ... Ms Walsh-Smith claimed that Mr Di Stefano duped her into investing in the News of the World online while she was contributing a weekly column, "Livin' an' Lovin' with Tricia Walsh-Smith". Four of the August 2012 charges against him related to Walsh-Smith; Di Stefano had falsely claimed to be a lawyer, claiming he could overturn the Walsh-Smith pre-nuptial agreement, and persuading Walsh-Smith to invest in News of the World online. This brought the charges against Di Stefano up to 28 counts of fraud and his trial began at Southwark Crown Court on 28 January 2013. On 6 March 2013, he told the court that he was a qualified advocate because Yugoslavian president Milošević had awarded him an honorary law doctorate from the University of Belgrade "simply because he had asked."

On 27 March 2013, he was found guilty of all charges; nine counts of obtaining a money transfer by deception, eight counts of fraud, three counts of acquiring criminal property, two counts of using a false instrument, one count of attempting to obtain a money transfer by deception, one count of obtaining property by deception and one count of using criminal property. He subsequently pleaded guilty to two additional counts: defrauding a couple out of £160,000, including a woman's life savings of £75,000, and stealing £150,000 from a man who had been in a car accident and lost a limb.

He was sentenced to 14 years' imprisonment. Judge Alistair McCreath said that Di Stefano had caused misery and frustration to many people and called him a predator for his treatment of "desperate and vulnerable" clients: "You had no regard for them nor for their anguish. Your only concern was to line your own pockets." He described Di Stefano's crimes as "planned and persistent," his defence in court as "breathtakingly cynical," and his overall conduct as showing "greed, dishonesty and utter disregard for the sensibilities of others."

Hilary Ryan, from the Crown Prosecution Service's organised crime division, said: "For many years, Giovanni Di Stefano described himself to potential clients as a lawyer and usually as an Italian 'avvocato'. He was nothing of the sort. When the law caught up with him, he falsely claimed to have obtained various formal legal qualifications. He then went on to claim that having taught himself the law, he was entitled to describe himself as a lawyer. This was fraud by anyone's standards and a charade that he kept up for over eight years in order to line his own pockets. (...) Giovanni Di Stefano routinely tricked his clients and abused their trust. (...)"

On 4 April 2014, eight and a half years were added to Di Stefano's 14-year sentence, unless he compensated his victims immediately. The judge who jailed him in March 2013 at Southwark Crown Court, Alistair McCreath, told him to "pay back £1.4 million forthwith or serve the extra time." He said Di Stefano had no intention of paying and had "stuck up two fingers to the court". Di Stefano's sentence was served at HMP Highpoint, with him being released in April 2023.

== Other interests ==
=== Football ===
When he went back to Italy to the region of his birth, he bought the local team Campobasso Calcio; the club had to close a year later due to financial problems. In association with Arkan, he purchased control of the Serbian second division football club FK Obilić; within two seasons, the club was promoted from the Serbian second division to a place in the UEFA Champions League, amidst accusations of threats, intimidations, and match-fixing, which Di Stefano has always denied. Di Stefano announced in 1999 he had purchased 34% of Dundee F.C., but Dundee's board denied that any deal had been closed. The board finally rejected the bid when it was made public that he was a friend of Serbian warlord Arkan, and that Suffolk Constabulary had issued an extradition warrant for fraud charges dating back to 1991. In January 2001, Di Stefano announced his intention to purchase a 6% stake in Norwich City from its former vice-chairman Jimmy Jones. These shares would not give Di Stefano a seat of the board of directors, but he said that they allowed him to sue the majority shareholders to get a seat or to buy more shares. The club officials claim that the share transfer was never confirmed.

In 2002, Di Stefano entered into talks to purchase a 60% stake in Northampton Town FC, however, Di Stefano's valuation of the club changed following an EGM, and the deal fell through. Di Stefano approached the Dundee board again in 2003, and was appointed as a director on 7 August 2003. Initially, the club attracted big-name players such as Craig Burley and Fabrizio Ravanelli but it quickly ran into financial difficulties; 15 senior players were released from their contracts, the Scottish Football Association refused to confirm his appointment as director because his fraud convictions didn't qualify him as a "fit and proper person" as required by article 10 of its rules. The Dundee board asked Di Stefano to resign, which he did on 22 January 2004. In April 2005, he proclaimed an interest in investing approximately €1m in Irish football club Shelbourne, but the club rejected his interest, citing his decision to let his intentions be known to the media first as the reason. In April 2006, there were rumours about Di Stefano trying to buy Drogheda United F.C. and Waterford United F.C., but both clubs issued statements denying any contact. In October 2007, Di Stefano announced through his website his renewed interest in taking control of Norwich City. In February 2011 the French magazine So Foot published an interview stating that Di Stefano was considering a bid with others to acquire a stake in AS Monaco FC and multi branding the football club with his record companies.

A 2019 book relates his involvement with Norwich City and Dundee, what happened with the signings of footballers Fabrizio Ravanelli and Claudio Caniggia, and what could have happened if Di Stefano had managed to take over the clubs.

=== Music production ===
In 2007, he produced and launched Seriously Single, an album by Italian singer JustCarmen that put a relatively unknown singer into the studio with recordings of big stars from the past. The album was a minor hit, selling 40,000 copies, but some of the duet tracks got 650,000 downloads. In 2009, he produced and launched a second album by JustCarmen, I wish u love, which had two new duets with The Bachelors.

His interest in music comes from his youth, when he played guitar themes and organised music events for his house at school. He also released a CD in 2009 with his own songs, titled The Next Time.

=== Politics ===
In April 2004, Di Stefano founded a political party, the Radical Party of Great Britain, registering it at the Electoral Commission with himself as leader, but the party fielded no candidates in the 2005 general election, the 2008 London Assembly election, or the 2008 local elections. It reported no income, expenditure, assets or liabilities in 2006–2008.

In a November 2007 interview with Dublin's Hot Press magazine's senior editor Jason O'Toole, Di Stefano expressed an interest in running in the Republic of Ireland in the European Union elections with an anti-immigration manifesto. (Note: "I'm going to run in Ireland in the European elections. You better believe it. I'm perfectly entitled in the European election to run in any EU state. You don't need to be resident or Irish. I will take my seat in Ireland because a lot of people will follow me. We are not a right-wing party. We may be radical in name but not in nature. One of the things we'll have to deal with, as a matter of urgency, is immigration. That is the key thing because otherwise you are going to dilute Irish blood to such an extent that you'll almost wish that Cromwell hadn't got ill!")

Around 1999–2002, he had been the secretary general of the "right wing but not fanatical" Partito Nazionale Italiano. In 1999, he was also the foreign speaker of the Party of Serbian Unity of his friend Arkan.

=== Other companies ===
In the eighties, Di Stefano says that he imported videotapes from Hong Kong into the UK, making a £200 million fortune when he was still in his 20s.

In 1992–1999, when he was in Yugoslavia, Di Stefano says that he invested in the country's national airline, which had been grounded because of the war.

In 1990, Di Stefano and some partners tried to buy the MGM movie studios. One of the MGM executives said in Variety that Di Stefano's bid was the stuff of "Alice in Wonderland". The bid was not successful. His partners Florio Fiorini and Giancarlo Parretti bribed officials of Credit Lyonnais bank so they could obtain a credit to bid for MGM, and they were eventually jailed. Di Stefano says that the only consequence for him was that he was deported from the US. After being deported, Di Stefano migrated to Yugoslavia in fear of what the bank could do to him after causing such a loss of money. He says that he actually earned $249 million from the deal, at a time when he was still in his 30s. According to Di Stefano, in 1989 he bought Cinema Five UK, a chain of 50 cinemas, from MGM for only £8 million, and he resold them for $249 million (£160 million) to Credit Lyonnais, and this is partly the basis of his personal fortune (In 2003 Di Stefano claimed to have a fortune of £450 million.) The Scotsman says that MGM sued Di Stefano and won damages from him.

In 1993, on behalf of Sandhurst Assets, Di Stefano offered to buy Viajes Meliá, a Spanish travel agency owned by hotel chain Sol Meliá, just as another company had retracted its bid. The company was heavily in debt, and Di Stefano offered only $100 million, promising to put forward $350 million (4,000 million pesetas at that time) to pay the debts once he was the owner, and further $50 million (around 575 million pesetas) in investments. Di Stefano was later arrested for fraud over dealings related to Sandhurst.

In 1999, Di Stefano, conducting his business affairs from jail, started negotiations to buy for £10 million the Ellington Colliery, a deep coal mine that was about to close, but he could not get the necessary permission from the Coal Authority. He lost interest in the deal by 2000, when his associate Arkan was murdered.
