= Jason O'Toole =

Jason O'Toole may refer to:

- Jason O'Toole (musician), vocalist for New York hardcore band Life's Blood
- Jason O'Toole (journalist) (born 1973), Irish author and journalist
