= Live at the Olympia (Damien Dempsey album) =

Live album by Damien Dempsey
- Released: June 2, 2006 (Ireland); June 5, 2006 (UK)
- Recorded: 15 December 2005
- Genre: Folk rock
- Length: 60:16
- Label: Sony BMG, Clear Records
- Producer: John Reynolds

Damien Dempsey chronology
They Don't Teach This Shit in School	Live at the Olympia (2006)	Shots (2006)

Live at the Olympia is the first live album by Damien Dempsey, released in 2006. The recording is taken from a live performance at Dublin's Olympia Theater on 15 December 2005.

The album was released as it was recorded live on the night, without the addition of any overdubs.

== Tracks ==
1. "Patience"
2. "Party On"
3. "Hold Me"
4. "Seize the Day"
5. "Not On Your Own Tonight"
6. "Apple Of My Eye"
7. "Sing All Our Cares Away"
8. "Negative Vibes"
9. "Industrial School"
10. "It's All Good"

Encore:

1. "Factories"
2. "Colony"

== Chart performance ==
The album debuted on the Irish Albums Chart at #10, and remained in the top 75 for six weeks.

Chart (2006)	Peak position
Irish Albums Chart	10
