= Don't Stay =

Don't Stay may refer to:

- Don't Stay (album), a 2008 album by Nami Tamaki
- "Don't Stay" (Laura Izibor song), from her album Let The Truth Be Told
- "Don't Stay", a song by Linkin Park from Meteora
- "Don't Stay", a song by Joanne from Do Not Disturb
- "Don't Stay", a song by X Ambassadors
