= Live at the Olympia =

Live at the Olympia may refer to:

- Live at the Olympia (R.E.M. album), 2009
- Live at the Olympia (Damien Dempsey album), 2006
