= From My Heart to Yours =

From My Heart to Yours may refer to:

- From My Heart to Yours, an extended play by LeAnn Rimes
- From My Heart to Yours, an album by Gloria Lynne
- "From My Heart to Yours" (song), a song by Laura Izibor
