= Katy French =

Irish socialite and model (1983–2007)

- Born: Katy Ellen French; 31 October 1983; Basel, Switzerland
- Died: 6 December 2007 (aged 24); Navan, County Meath, Ireland

Katy Ellen French (31 October 1983 – 6 December 2007) was an Irish socialite, model, writer, television personality and charity worker. According to the BBC, "in the space of less than two years, she had become one of Ireland's best-known models and socialites." She collapsed at a friend's house on 2 December 2007 and died on 6 December. Her cause of death was given as hypoxic ischemic brain injury caused by cocaine and ephedrine.

== Early life ==
French was born in Basel, Switzerland, to parents Janet (from Britain) and John French (from Australia). She moved with her family to Ireland aged two, briefly living in the Sandyford area before settling in Enniskerry, County Wicklow, and later to Stillorgan, County Dublin. French attended Alexandra College in Milltown, Dublin, from the age of seven. While still in school she worked part-time as a hostess at the Dublin branch of the Planet Hollywood restaurant chain.

== Career ==
Katy French studied psychology and marketing before working for the Assets Modelling Agency and later writing articles for several Dublin magazines and newspapers. She represented Sony Ericsson and Suzuki among many other brands, becoming more famous in 2007 as a result of her fiancé, restaurateur Marcus Sweeney, ending their relationship in a very public fashion after French was photographed for a lingerie shoot for the Sunday Independent in his restaurant in January of that year. As a result of this publicity, her image appeared more regularly in daily Irish tabloid newspapers and she made numerous television appearances on shows such as RTÉ's The Podge and Rodge Show in April 2007 and Tubridy Tonight a week before her death. French was known for deliberately courting controversy to promote her career. On Tubridy Tonight she spoke of her appearance on Celebrities Go Wild as well as her relationship break up with Sweeney. Mention was also made of her birthday party which she was to celebrate the following week, having missed her birthday due to Celebrities Go Wild. Host Ryan Tubridy was invited to the event. Footage was shown of the charity single "Down in the Bog" which was to be released as a Christmas single. She worked for several Irish charities including Our Lady's Children's Hospital, Crumlin and GOAL in Calcutta, India. She wrote a column for Social & Personal magazine.

In an interview with Hot Press's Jason O'Toole, she said that she would consider having an abortion if she became pregnant during the peak of her career, and that she loved fur despite being a "massive animal lover". She also aired her religious beliefs (she was a member of the Church of England but also practised Catholicism) and spoke highly of Islam and her Muslim friends saying, "When you read the Koran, you realise that Islam is a beautiful religion". In the same interview she was asked if she had ever used cocaine and denied ever having done so. In November 2007, French told an Irish tabloid that she had used cocaine, but had stopped. A week before she died, she celebrated her 24th birthday with celebrity and media friends.

== Death ==
French died on the evening of 6 December 2007 in Our Lady's Hospital, Navan, in County Meath, having collapsed at a house in Kilmessan, County Meath, in the early hours of Sunday 2 December. There was widespread speculation in the media that her death was the result of a drug overdose. A post mortem found she had suffered brain damage, and that traces of cocaine were found in her body. A senior Garda stated "We strongly suspect that drugs contributed to her death. This was a previously healthy person being brought to hospital in a collapsed state." In 2010 two people were charged with supplying cocaine to Katy French and in failing to get medical assistance in a timely fashion. She was buried in her hometown of Enniskerry, County Wicklow, on 10 December. The Taoiseach's aide de camp, Captain Michael Tracey, attended her funeral.

On 13 November 2012, two friends of French, Kieron Ducie and Ann Corcoran, pleaded guilty to possession of cocaine with intent to supply on the weekend of French's death. Trim Circuit Court was told that a second charge against the pair was not being pursued, that they had intentionally or recklessly engaged in behaviour relating to the supply of cocaine to French and failed to get medical assistance in a timely fashion. In July 2013 the pair were sentenced to a 2 1/2-year suspended sentence and three-year good behaviour bond, and a two-year suspended sentence and two-year good behaviour bond respectively. At the verdict French's cause of death was given as hypoxic ischemic brain injury caused by cocaine and ephedrine.
