= Stuart Clark (critic) =

English-Irish music journalist

- Born: England
- Occupation: music journalist
- Employer: Hot Press
- Known for: writing on popular music; radio and television commentary

Stuart Clark is an English-Irish music journalist who has written extensively for Hot Press, and is a regular contributor to Irish TV and radio. Before going into print journalism, he spent time on board the Voice of Peace and Radio Caroline ships, was part of the abortive Radio Free England/Ventura project on the MV Manor Park and spent six months with Radio Sovereign in northern Italy.

While still at Sevenoaks School in the 1970s, he was running round the fields of Kent as the operator of short-wave pirate Radio Mercury, eventually being raided and arrested on Christmas Eve 1977 while broadcasting from a wooded area next to Princess Diana's former school, West Heath. As of 2021, Clark was the deputy editor of Hot Press and had penned an official Why Can't We? book in collaboration with The Cranberries. He has also supplied the sleeve notes for several Cranberries album re-releases and box-sets.

A roving reporter on Virgin Media's The Uprising TV show, he has also contributed to outlets including 2fm, RTÉ Radio One, Today FM, BBC Radio Ulster, Radio Nova, the Irish Daily Mail, Business Post, Evening Herald, Food and Wine, the Ritz Hotel magazine and the Ryanair, EasyJet and Wizz Air inflight magazines.

In January 2026, he MC-ed the Hot Press 50th birthday "History In The Making" concert in Dublin's 3Arena, which included former President of Ireland Michael D. Higgins, Van Morrison, Dermot Kennedy with Mike and Noel Hogan, Imelda May, Clannad, Denise Chaila, The Frames, The Boomtown Rats, Florence Road and Damien Dempsey.
