= Jason O'Toole (journalist) =

Irish journalist, author and playwright

- Born: 10 December 1973 (age 52); Ireland

Jason O'Toole (born 10 December 1973) is an Irish author, filmmaker, and playwright. He is a former newspaper and magazine editor, and Sunday newspaper columnist. He also writes regularly for Hot Press magazine

== Education ==
Jason O'Toole earned a BA in humanities and an MA in political communication from Dublin City University (DCU).

== Theatre work ==
O'Toole's first play The Intruder had a rehearsed reading streamed by Hot Press magazine in June 2021. It was filmed at Dublin's Civic Theatre and had a new score written for it by David Bowie's Next Day album collaborator Gerry Leonard and was read by Titanic star Jason Barry and Rex Ryan. The play's poster was designed by the legendary designer Stephen Averill who created many of U2's most iconic album covers.

== Books ==
O'Toole edited an anthology of new Irish fiction, entitled Off The Edge (2006), with an introduction by author Lee Dunne. His book Crime Ink, a collection of his Hot Press journalism, was released in July 2009. It went straight into the top 10 best-sellers list in Ireland on its release; it includes the first ever interviews with some of Ireland's and UK's most notorious criminals and IRA figures, such as: John Gilligan, Paddy "Dutchy" Holland, Alan Bradley (aka Fat Puss), Paddy McCann (Ireland's longest serving prisoner for double murder), Ian Strachan (the Royal Blackmailer) and IRA bosses John Noonan and Gerry Kelly. The book was selected as part of the Be Inspired: Great Irish Book Week, and a chapter from it was included in the anthology Gems from Irish Publishing.

O'Toole wrote the biography of a former Taoiseach, Brian Cowen: The Path to Power (published by Transworld, a division of Random House, in October 2008). An excerpt from the book appears in the Lord of the Files anthology published in November 2011 by the Institute of Public Administration (IPA). He also wrote The Last Days of Katy French (2009, Merlin), which the Irish Independent wrote was "well written and non-judgmental", adding that "maybe the book should be required reading on the Leaving Certificate curriculum". Over 18 months after its release, the book surprisingly reentered the best-sellers charts at number 5 in non-fiction category in January 2011, according to the Nielsen figures published by the Sunday Independent on 22 January 2011.

O'Toole co-wrote The End of The Party with Bruce Arnold, published in November 2011 by Gill and Macmillan. The book was selected as one of the top ten Irish books of the year by Joe Duffy's RTÉ show Liveline The show described the book as "gripping", while the Irish Independent described the book as the "angriest yet" on the meltdown of the Irish economy. Writing in the Sunday Independent, political writer John Drennan stated: "...this reads like a fast-paced thriller crossed with scenes of farce that would be more appropriate to Halls Pictorial Weekly. End of the Party lifts the lid off the crypt of internal politicking and political ambition that buried Fianna Fail and the country. In particular, for the first time, it fully unveils the alcohol-induced inertia that hollowed out a once uniquely successful party."

O'Toole has a co-author credit on Jimmy Magee's memoir, "The Memory Man", published in Sept 2012 by Gill & Macmillan. The book entered the best-sellers charts at no 2 in the hardback non-fiction category. It was shortlisted for the Irish Sports Book of The Year Award, organised by Bord Gais. The legendary Irish broadcaster Gay Byrne voted Memory Man as his favourite book of 2012, saying it was a "great read". He wrote "Katie Taylor: Journey to Olympic Gold", published in October 2012 by Gill & MacMillan, and then he co-wrote Different Class with Jimmy Magee, published in October 2013.

O'Toole's book Hollywood Irish was published in September 2019, followed by The Writing Irish in December 2021.

O'Toole wrote The Gilligan Tapes from a series of in-depth interviews with notorious crime boss John Gilligan, published by Merrion Press in September 2023, which he also turned into a three-part documentary. It aired on Virgin Media Ireland over three nights in September 2023; causing huge controversy, with three senior government ministers criticising it before it had even been screened.

== Film ==
O'Toole directed the controversial three-part docuseries Confessions of a Crime Boss, which aired on Virgin Media Ireland in September 2023. Two Irish politicians, the Minister for Justice and Minister of State for Drugs, had called for the banning of the documentary before they had even watched the first episode. The three-part docuseries is now streaming on Amazon Prime Video UK.

== Journalism ==
O'Toole's journalism has appeared in dozens of publications, including The Sunday Times, The Irish Times , Empire magazine, The Mail on Sunday, Film Ireland, the Evening Herald, Irish Independent, La Republica, In Dublin, The People, The Daily Mail, "The Mirror", "Panorama", Enterprise, The Star on Sunday, The Dublin Quarterly, Playboy magazine and the Australian-based Irish Echo.

He has been described by several prominent Irish publications as the best interviewer of his generation. He wrote a weekly interview called, "The Jason O'Toole Interview", for the Irish Mail on Sunday and the Irish Daily Mail from 2009 to 2014. He is the former Senior Editor of the popular Irish publication, Hot Press magazine. He returned to his post of senior editor at Hot Press magazine in September 2016 and stepped down in December 2018. Between 2018 and 2022 he wrote a weekly column for the Irish Sunday Mirror. He also wrote a major weekly 2,000-words music interview with countless iconic figures, such as The Doors, Sex Pistols, Tom Jones, Elvis Costello, Tito Jackson, Jehtro Tull, Simple Minds, and Iron Maiden for the Irish Daily Mirror. between 2018 and March 2023.

== Awards ==
O'Toole was one of six short-listed for the National Journalist of the Year Award for the inaugural NNI Journalism Awards in October 2011.

The book he co-wrote with Jimmy Magee was short-listed for the Irish Sports Book of The Year Award, organised by Bord Gais.

O'Toole was short-listed for Features Journalist of the Year at the 2022 Irish Journalism Awards.

== Interviews ==
=== High-profile and controversial ===
O'Toole has conducted many high-profile controversial interviews with well-known and sometimes controversial Irish figures, including:

- John Gilligan – one of Ireland's most infamous criminals spoke at length to O'Toole about his life of crime and the murder of crime journalist Veronica Guerin. After the publication of the interview, Hot Press was banned from Irish prisons. The Minister for Justice, Dermot Ahern, described the publication of the Hot Press magazine interview with the convicted criminal as "regrettable". Ahern added he had been in contact with the head of the prison service and it was his understanding that O'Toole had signed into the Midlands Prison as a visitor and did not reveal that he was going to carry out an interview. He was responding to criticism by Fine Gael's justice spokesman Charlie Flanagan who urged the minister to enforce rules to prevent further interviews being carried out: "It is an insult to victims of crime to allow convicted criminals to enjoy such privileges while serving time."
- Brian Cowen – In his May 2007 interview with Jason O'Toole, former Minister for Health Brian Cowen admitted to smoking marijuana: "Anyone who went to the UCD bar in the '70s that didn't get a whiff of marijuana would be telling you a lie. I would say there were a couple of occasions when it was passed around – and, unlike President Clinton, I did inhale! There wasn't a whole lot in it really – (it was like) a Sweet Afton, as a 10-year-old, under a railway bridge on a rainy day, in small town Ireland in the late '60s. I certainly got more enjoyment out of a few pints." This provoked much criticism from opposition parties in the Dáil. Cowen later became Taoiseach following the resignation of Bertie Ahern. Cowen gave O'Toole his first major interview as Taoiseach, which appeared over two editions in Hot Press.
- Ian Paisley Jr – In May 2007, DUP's Ian Paisley, Jr., MLA, caused uproar in an interview O'Toole in Hot Press by publicly denouncing acts associated with homosexuality. This was the year before Iris Robinson, wife of then-First Minister Peter Robinson, made her thoughts on the issue. In an interview with Jason O'Toole, he said "I am pretty repulsed by gay and lesbianism. I think it is wrong. I think that those people harm themselves and – without caring about it – harm society. That doesn't mean to say that I hate them – I mean, I hate what they do". Dolores Kelly, the SDLP equality spokesman called on the Northern Ireland Assembly to censure Mr Paisley, saying "Ian Paisley is a junior minister in the Office of the First and Deputy First Minister, the department which is charged with promoting equality and bringing forward the Single Equality Bill. Vulnerable groups who are potential victims of discrimination should be able to look to him for help, not attack". However, the DUP denied that Paisley Jr's comments were discriminatory.
- Robert Sheehan – In October 2018, the Love/Hate star discussed his sex life. In an interview that made front-page news in the tabloids, he discussed losing his virginity, drunken encounters with men, explained why he longer enjoys no-strings-attached sex with FWB, and confessed to sleeping with fans.
- Charlie McCreevy – A December 2008 interview with Irish European Commissioner Charlie McCreevy was the subject of news stories and other commentary in The Irish Independent, The Irish Star, The Irish Mail, The Irish Mirror, The Irish Times and the Mail on Sunday, among other papers. It was covered extensively on radio, on RTÉ News and in other television including TV3's The Political Party. Internationally the interview was covered by the Wall Street Journal and the Morning Star, and the main news in Denmark featured it, as well as Das Journal in Austria, Diário Digital in Portugal and France's leading daily paper, Le Monde. The interview, conducted once again by O'Toole (this time in Brussels), had McCreevy say that Ireland's decision to reject the Lisbon Treaty had to be respected by the rest of Europe. McCreevy also revealed that he was pro-choice when it came to matters of abortion.
- Katy French – In her last major interview before her tragic death in December 2007, French spoke to O'Toole about her life, her thoughts on drugs and death. The interview became a regular source of information for newspaper reports in the aftermath, and was revisited by O'Toole in the Hot Press Annual 2008 which went to press just as she died.
- The Royal Blackmail case – in April 2009, O'Toole conducted the first ever in-depth interview with Ian Strachan, who received five years for his involvement in the Royal Blackmail scandal of 2007.
- Patricia McKenna – In an interview with O'Toole in May 2009, former Green Party MEP announced her decision to quit the party and run as an independent candidate in the European elections. McKenna gave a hugely controversial and provocative critique of the Green Party's performance since going into coalition with Fianna Fáil. McKenna was particularly scathing about the Green representatives in Government, dismissing the Greens in the Dáil as "nothing but hypocrites". She continued: "I feel embarrassed about being a member of the Green Party ... because of what we said in the past and the promises we made, which we failed to deliver on. I just knew that I couldn't run under a Green Party ticket and pretend that everything was alright because I'd be lying."

Other controversial interviews O'Toole conducted for Hot Press include:

- Paul Gogarty TD. In an expletive-laden interview with O'Toole, the Dublin Mid West Green TD commented on the price of power and his own doubts about the Coalition arrangement. He describes it in terms of the Greens lying "bollix naked" and being "screwed" by Fianna Fáil.
- Tony Gregory, the TD's last ever in-depth controversial interview was published days after his death in January 2009. In the final months of his battle with cancer, Gregory sat down with the author to discuss his life and career. Knowing it would be his final interview he was in a reflective frame of mind.
- Dutchy Holland, gangster, last ever interview.
- Alan 'Fat Puss' Bradley. The alleged bank robber insisted he is not a 'big player' in crime in his only ever print interview with O'Toole. But the man dubbed "Fat Puss" was due in court in 2009 on charges of conspiracy to commit armed robbery, with figures between €950,000 and €2 million being bandied about in the media.
- Paddy McCann, Ireland's longest-serving political prisoner. McCann was jailed for the killing of two Gardaí during a bank raid in Roscommon in 1980. In this extraordinary interview, McCann confesses to ordering executions from behind bars.
- Richard Bruton – in an August 2009 interview for Hot Press, which was one of O'Toole last interviews for the magazine, Richard Bruton admitted that his party leader was "wooden" when it came to sound bites. It prompted the media to speculate a leadership challenge – and prompted the bookies to slash odds on Bruton becoming FG party leader.
- John Noonan, former IRA boss. Noonan, who played a pivotal role in the IRA's military campaign in Northern Ireland, gave his only ever interview to the author. The article prompted over 100 Garda, according to The Sunday Times, to raid Noonan's home and launch a CAB investigation into his activities. In the interview, Noonan said rumours of a CAB investigation into his finances were unfounded and claimed to run a licensed security company.
- Kieron "Wolfie" Ducie, gave his first major interview to O'Toole
- Giovanni Di Stefano, Italian fraudster and fake lawyer. O'Toole also included interviews with Di Stefano in his 2009 book "Crime Ink".
- Rosanna Davison, former Miss World. In a confessional interview, Davison discussed her sex life and her famous father's affair with the nanny. She also talked in the interview about being married to her father in a previous life.
- Mick Pyro, lead singer of Republic of Loose
- Declan Ganley, Chairperson of Libertas
- Bobby Storey – O'Toole conducted the first in-depth interview with Bobby Storey, alleged to be the IRA's Director of Intelligence, in June 2009.
- Jonathan Rhys Meyers – the interview, which directly preceded the death of his mother, had Rhys Meyers reflecting on his problems with drinking, his spells in rehab and discussing life as a movie star; the actor was arrested in Dublin Airport only hours after this interview was conducted.
- Mary O'Rourke, former Fianna Fáil deputy leader, told O'Toole how orgasms are no longer a part of her life since her husband died.
- Gerry Kelly, ex-IRA. In his first-ever in-depth interview, Kelly gave O'Toole an extraordinarily frank account of his time with the IRA.

=== "The Jason O'Toole Interview" column ===
O'Toole's weekly interview in the Irish Daily Mail and the Irish Mail on Sunday has included several exclusive and controversial interviews, including:

- Phil Lynott's mother revealed for the first time ever in an interview with O'Toole that she had lied in her autobiography about having 'only' one son. In a 10-page article she explained that she had two other children that she gave up for adoption.
- Luke 'Ming' Flanagan caused uproar when he confessed to taking cocaine, making him the first elected TD to do so, in an interview with O'Toole back in 2013.
- Senator and gay activist David Norris, a presidential hopeful in the 2011 election, revealed to O'Toole that he had slept with women but it wasn't his "brand of coca cola". Norris initially stepped down from the presidential election following an interview with O'Toole in which he confessed that he didn't believe in an age of consent.
- O'Toole published the first post-prison interview with Irish crime boss John Gilligan.
- O'Toole published a controversial interview with Anglo Banker David Drumm.
- O'Toole was granted the first interview with Archbishop of Ireland, Eamon Martin.
- Libertas's Declan Ganley revealed in a Dec 2010 interview with O'Toole that he "wasn't ruling out" re-entering the political fray.
- Rock musician Leanne Harte came out as a lesbian in an interview with O'Toole published in June 2010.
- In December 2015, Jim Corr of The Corrs revealed to O'Toole that he was in AA and that he had sold his Ferrari and helicopter to clear some of his debts.

== Political interviews ==
Other political interviews O'Toole has conducted for Hot Press include:

- Fine Gael leader Enda Kenny
- Sinn Féin's Gerry Adams and Martin McGuinness
- Former PD leader Ciaran Cannon
- Fianna Fáil's Seanad leader Donnie Cassidy
- Green Party leaders John Gormley and Trevor Sargent
- Labour party leader Eamon Gilmore and its former leader, Pat Rabbitte
- Ex-Workers' Party president Tomas Mac Giolla
- SDLP leader Mark Durkan
- Minister for European Affairs Dick Roche; Senator Eoghan Harris; Minister Eamon O'Cuiv

== Publishing ==
O'Toole is senior editor/publisher of Killynon House Books. The imprint has published a dozen books as well as books by Lee Dunne, Fr Shay Cullen, Jackie Hayden, Bruce Arnold, Neville Thompson, TS O'Rourke, comedian Karl McDermott and an anthology of stories by Irish prisoners.
