= Naimee Coleman =

Irish musician

- Born: 8 December 1976 (age 49); Dundrum, Dublin, Ireland
- Occupations: Singer; songwriter
- Instrument: Vocals
- Years active: 1994–present
- Label: Chrysalis
- Formerly of: Wilde Oscars

Naimee Coleman (born 8 December 1976) is an Irish singer and songwriter from Dundrum, Dublin, Ireland. Coleman began writing music at the age of 14 and won the 2FM Song Contest in 1994 as a member of a band named the Wilde Oscars. After signing with EMI, she recorded her debut solo studio album, Silver Wrists (1996). The album was produced by Peter Van Hooke and recorded at Abbey Road Studios. The follow-up, Bring Down the Moon, came 4 years later.

On the strength of these records, she toured Europe, the US, and Japan, where her singles topped airplay charts. While touring, Naimee has shared the stage with and opened up for artists such as Van Morrison, Suzanne Vega, Jackson Browne, 10,000 Maniacs, Sinéad O'Connor and Sting. She has written with Howard Jones, Phill Thornally (The Cure), Pam Rose, Maiah Sharpe and Aurora.

She provided the vocals for Cass & Slide's "Perception" (Vocal Mix) in 2000 and has also done vocals for Aurora, notably on covers of Duran Duran's "Ordinary World" in 2000 and Tasmin Archer's "Sleeping Satellite" (2003). She sings backup vocals for two tracks on the 2003 Saucy Monky album "Celebrity Trash" and joined Saucy Monky's 2017 Irish reunion tour.

== Discography ==
- Silver Wrists (Chrysalis, 1996)
- Bring Down the Moon (Chrysalis, 2001)
