= Celaviedmai =

Irish rapper (born c.1994)

- Born: c. 1994 (age 31–32); Galway, Ireland
- Origin: Ireland
- Genre: Hip hop
- Years active: 2013–present

Maimouna Salif (born c. 1994), known by her stage name Celaviedmai, is an Irish rapper.

== Early life ==
Salif was born c. 1994, in Galway. Her parents emigrated to Ireland from the Ivory Coast.

== Career ==
In 2013, Salif was one of 3 Irish acts chosen to open for Lil Wayne at the O2 Arena. Her debut single, Dive, was released in 2018. She has also opened for Mac Miller, Tinchy Stryder, Sneakbo and Jafaris. Her 2020 single, Questions, topped Spotify's Rap IE playlist. In 2020, she was one of the acts featured in the Hot Press Lockdown Sessions. She has collaborated with Alicia Raye, Nealo and Alan Mckee. She was also featured in the Department of Culture, Heritage and the Gaeltacht's The Y&E Series in June 2020.

Salif has been a supporter of the Black Lives Matter movement in Ireland, and has spoken about her experiences with everyday racism in Ireland. She was one of the organisers of the Youth Against Racism & Inequality Day of Action on 25 July 2020, which took place in Dublin, Cork, Limerick and Galway.

== Discography ==
=== Singles ===
- "Dive" (2018)
- "Confessions" (2019)
- "Reckless" (2020)
- "Questions" (2020) featuring Nealo and Alan Mckee
- "Love Wins" (2020) collaboration with Alicia Raye
