= Saucy Monky =

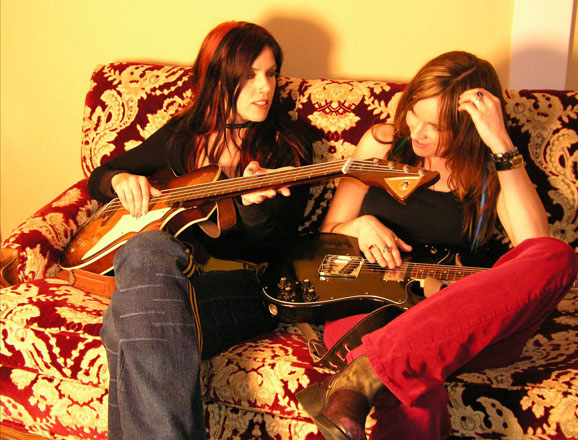
- Catania and Cullen

Background information
- Origin: Los Angeles, California, U.S.
- Genres: Indie rock, pop rock
- Years active: 2001–present
- Labels: olivoIL, Savoy, 429
- Members: Cynthia Catania – vocals, guitars Annmarie Cullen – vocals, guitars Megan Jane – drums Steve Giles – bass, vocals
- Past members: Adam Marcello; Carson Cohen; Danny Hannon; Karen Teperberg
- Website: SaucyMonky.com

Saucy Monky are an indie pop band based in Los Angeles, California.

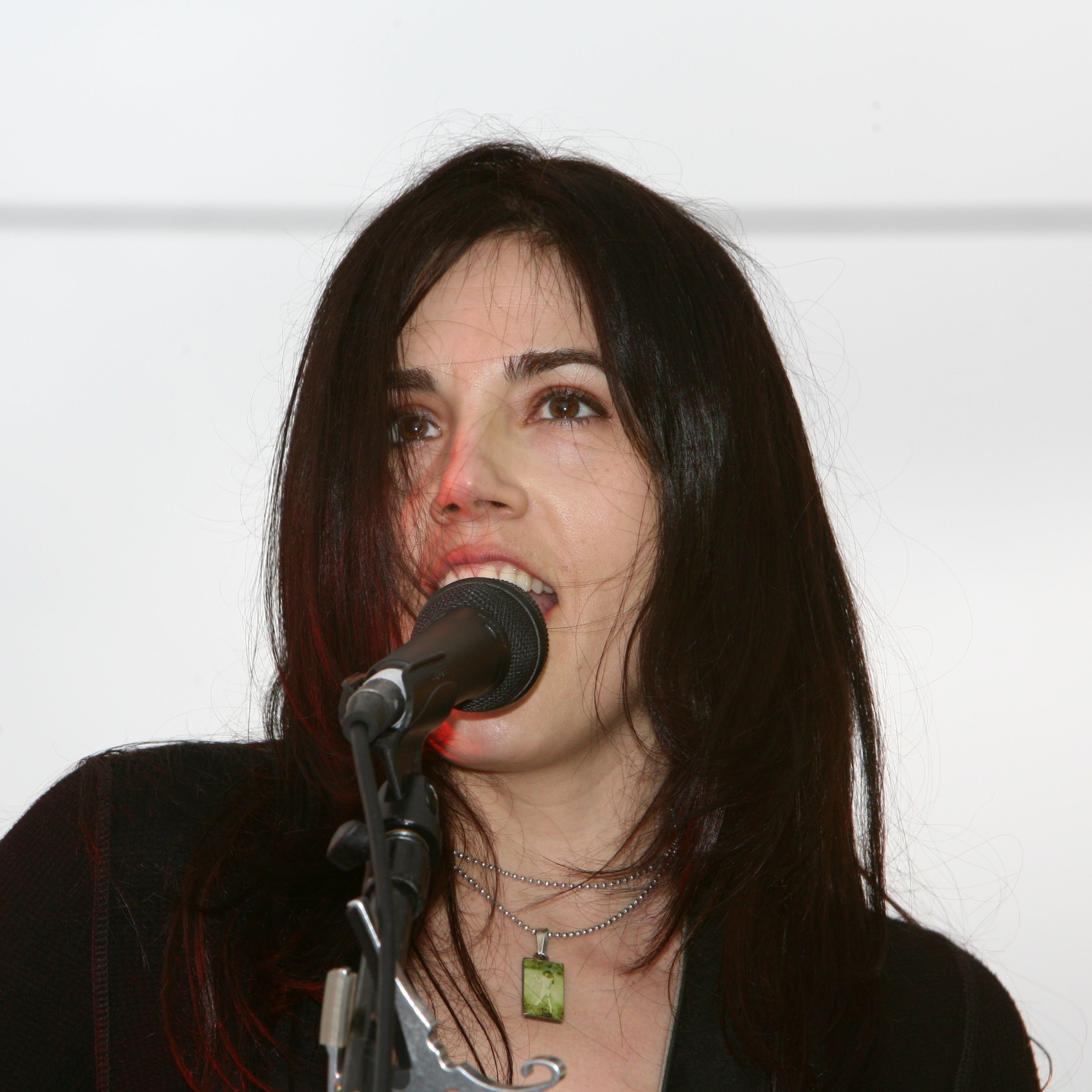
Saucy Monky at San Diego Indie Music Fest 2008

The band is fronted by Dublin-born singer and guitarist Annmarie Cullen (who formerly performed under the pseudonym Ann Marie Montade) and East Coast singer Cynthia Catania. Their rhythm section is Steve Giles (bass) and Megan Jane (drums).

The group was formed in 2001. Catania, explaining the origin of the band's name, said, "We were looking around for a name and I had this book by Tina Brown and I think the title was Life as a Party and there was a phrase in it that had something to do with being a saucy monkey and in reference to life in U.K.."

Their debut album Celebrity Trash was released in 2003 and spawned two hit radio singles in Ireland — "Flicker" and "Don't Wanna Know Your Name". In the summer of 2004 they released a remaking of the Divinyls song "I Touch Myself", which became another hit at Irish radio. The single was followed by their first full-length album, Turbulence, in September by 429 Records.

In 2005, they signed a major distribution deal with the Savoy Label Group and re-released Turbulence in June 2005 across the United States. The first single to be released is "Disco Ball (Boulevard Remix)", a re-working of an older track from their first album. Disco Ball (Boulevard Remix) became a top 40 AAA radio hit.

In September 2005, the band signed a deal with Measured Records in the United Kingdom which saw the release of the single "Good Day Down" and the Turbulence album.

In February 2006, they released "I Touch Myself" as a single; the song was later used on an episode of the TV series Veronica Mars. Other songs by the band have been featured on episodes of Nickelodeon series Drake & Josh, Zoey 101 and iCarly.

In 2008, the band released the EP Between the Bars. Notable tracks are "All The Things Ya Know", "Acrobat" and a cover of the Carpenters classic "Superstar". Recent placements include 4 songs on the independent soundtrack for And Then Came Lola (Wolfe Video), Blue Bloods (CBS) and Alcatraz (Fox). Catania and Cullen penned the theme song for 2011's Food for Thought with Claire Thomas on the ABC network.

The band ended a 10-year hiatus in 2017 with the release of a new single and an Irish reunion tour where they were joined on stage by Naimee Coleman and Sylvie Lewis. Their song "F’n Love” was featured in the 2021 movie The Breakdown.

== Discography ==
- 8 Song Sampler (2002)
- Celebrity Trash (2003)
- Turbulence (2004)
- Between The Bars (2008)
- Trophy Girl (Parts 1 & 2) (2012)
