= 2FM Song Contest =

Songwriting competition for young people in Ireland

- Awarded for: best new song from entries submitted by writers aged 20 and under
- Country: Ireland
- Presented by: RTÉ 2fm
- First award: 1982; 44 years ago
- Final award: 2017; 9 years ago

The 2FM Song Contest, known for sponsorship reasons as The Jacobs/2FM Song Contest or 2fm/Perri Song Contest was an annual song writing competition for young people in Ireland. Created by producer/presenter Kevin Hough, it was run by national broadcaster RTÉ 2fm from 1982 to 2017.

== Legacy ==
Winners included Naimee Coleman, Elaine Hearty, Laura Izibor, Sarah Packiam, RuthAnne, Dave Geraghty and 2008 Karaoke World Championships runner-up Elaine O'Halloran. Damien Dempsey was once a runner-up in the competition, and other contestants have included 21 Demands (Kodaline). The 2005 winner won €8,000 of musical equipment.

Laura Izibor's, winning song "Compatible", received constant airplay after she won the competition and RTÉ filmed a documentary of Izibor after winning the competition.
