= It's All Good – The Best of Damien Dempsey =

It's All Good: The Best Of Damien Dempsey

Compilation album by Damien Dempsey
- Released: February 2014 (Ireland)
- Label: Clear

Damien Dempsey chronology
Almighty Love (2012)	It's All Good: The Best Of Damien Dempsey (2014)

Professional ratings
Review scores
Source	Rating
entertainment.ie	3.5/5 stars
The Irish Times	3/5 stars

It's All Good: The Best of Damien Dempsey is a compilation album by Irish singer-songwriter Damien Dempsey, released in February 2014. The album contains twenty-nine tracks over two discs, and topped the Irish Albums Chart.

== Track listing ==
Disc one
No.	Title	Length
1.	"It's All Good"	5:16
2.	"Sing All Our Cares Away"	3:35
3.	"Apple of My Eye"	3:44
4.	"Kilburn Stroll"	5:12
5.	"Canadian Geese"	4:54
6.	"Not On Your Own Tonight"	4:00
7.	"Patience"	5:05
8.	"Chris and Stevie"	5:55
9.	"Serious"	4:55
10.	"Colony"	7:11
11.	"Negative Vibes"	4:46
12.	"Factories"	5:20
13.	"Bustin Outta Here"	5:43
14.	"Spraypaint Backalley"	6:30

Disc two
No.	Title	Length
15.	"Party On"	4:59
16.	"Maasai"	3:59
17.	"How Strange"	5:48
18.	"The Rocky Road"	3:55
19.	"Kelly From Killan / The Teetotaler"	5:41
20.	"St Patrick's Brave Brigade"	5:14
21.	"A Rainy Night in Soho"	6:17
22.	"The Auld Triangle"	4:19
23.	"Ghosts of Overdoses"	4:40
24.	"Your Pretty Smile"	4:17
25.	"I've No Alibi"	5:20
26.	"Almighty Love"	3:48
27.	"Beside the Sea"	4:57
28.	"Happy Days"	3:39
29.	"You're the Cure"	6:52

== Charts ==
Chart performance for It's All Good – The Best of Damien Dempsey
Chart (2014)	Peak position
Irish Albums (IRMA)	1
