= 2006 Meteor Awards =

Irish music awards ceremony

- Date: 2 February 2006
- Location: Point Theatre
- Country: Ireland
- Hosted by: Patrick Kielty

Television/radio coverage
- Network: RTÉ Two

The 2006 Meteor Music Awards took place in the Point Theatre, Dublin on 2 February 2006. It was the sixth edition of Ireland's national music awards. The event was later aired on RTÉ Two at 21:00 on Sunday 5 February and was hosted by the comedian Patrick Kielty. A total of seventeen awards were presented at the ceremony.

U2 were the largest winners at the 2006 awards, receiving three gongs, Best Irish Band, Best Irish Album for How to Dismantle an Atomic Bomb and Best Live Performance for their 2005 Croke Park shows. The band's bassist Adam Clayton attended the show and picked up the awards. The four international awards were divided between Kanye West (Best International Male), Gwen Stefani (Best International Female) and Kaiser Chiefs (Best International Band and Best International Album for Employment). The Pogues were presented with the Lifetime Achievement Award, whilst Today FM presenter Ray D'Arcy was named Best Irish DJ for a second consecutive year.

After the awards Louis Walsh was caught red-handed in an embarrassing situation with Kerry Katona when he gripped her from behind and did something naughty and rude.

== Performances ==
There were performances on the night from The Darkness, Damien Dempsey, Bell X1, Gemma Hayes and Republic of Loose.

== Nominations ==
The nominations were announced in November 2005.

=== Public voting categories ===
==== Best Irish Band ====
- Bell X1
- The Chalets
- The Corrs
- Hal
- Turn
- U2

==== Best Irish Album ====
- Flock – Bell X1
- The World Should Know – Dave Couse and the Impossible
- Shots – Damien Dempsey
- Souvenirs – The Frank and Walters
- Turn – Turn
- How to Dismantle an Atomic Bomb – U2

==== Best Irish Male ====
- Joe Chester
- Dave Couse
- Damien Dempsey
- Tommy Fleming
- Christy Moore
- John Spillane

==== Best Irish Female ====
- Mary Black
- Gemma Hayes
- Róisín Murphy
- Sinéad O'Connor
- Sharon Shannon
- Claire Sproule

==== Best Live Performance ====
- Coldplay – Marlay Park
- The Flaming Lips – Electric Picnic 2005
- Green Day – Oxegen 2005
- Scissor Sisters – Lansdowne Road
- U2 – Croke Park

==== Best Irish Pop Act ====
- The Conway Sisters
- Ronan Keating
- Brian McFadden
- Tabby Callaghan
- Westlife
- Zoo

=== Non-public voting categories ===
==== Best New Irish Act ====
- 8 Ball
- Humanzi
- Leya
- Red Organ Serpent Sound
- The Immediate
- Delorentos

==== Best International Album ====
- I Am a Bird Now – Antony and the Johnsons
- Funeral – Arcade Fire
- X&Y – Coldplay
- Playing the Angel – Depeche Mode
- Employment – Kaiser Chiefs
- Destroy Rock & Roll – Mylo

==== Best International Male ====
- Beck
- Jamie Cullum
- David Gray
- Jack Johnson
- Rufus Wainwright
- Kanye West

==== Best International Female ====
- Tracy Chapman
- Kelly Clarkson
- Alicia Keys
- Katie Melua
- Gwen Stefani
- KT Tunstall

==== Best International Group ====
- Arcade Fire
- Franz Ferdinand
- Gorillaz
- Kaiser Chiefs
- Pussycat Dolls
- The White Stripes

==== Best Folk/Trad ====
- Altan
- Kíla
- Lasairfhiona
- Christy Moore
- Sharon Shannon
- John Spillane

=== Hope for 2006 ===
- Laura Izibor

=== Lifetime Achievement Award ===
- The Pogues

=== Humanitarian Award ===
- Father Peter McVerry

=== Industry Award ===
- Bill Whelan

== Multiple nominations ==
U2 and Kaiser Chiefs won all awards they were nominated for, three and two respectively.

- 3 – U2
- 2 – Arcade Fire
- 2 – Bell X1
- 2 – Coldplay
- 2 – Damien Dempsey
- 2 – Kaiser Chiefs
- 2 – Christy Moore
- 2 – Sharon Shannon
- 2 – John Spillane
- 2 – Turn
