= Almighty Love =

Studio album by Damien Dempsey
- Released: 28 September 2012
- Studios: New Air Studios, London
- Length: 62:32
- Label: Clear Records
- Producer: John Reynolds

Damien Dempsey chronology
The Rocky Road (2008)	Almighty Love (2012)	It's All Good – The Best of Damien Dempsey (2014)

Almighty Love is the sixth studio album by the Irish singer-songwriter Damien Dempsey. Four years in the making, the album once again features Dempsey with long-time producer John Reynolds with Sinéad O'Connor again providing backing vocals on several tracks.

Almighty Love was released on 28 September 2012, along with the title track as the first single. The album sees Dempsey continue his exploration of local Irish themes, but with a greater focus on wider themes such as love, peace and justice.

== Track listing ==
The album Almighty Love contains eleven tracks and is sixty-two minutes in length.

No.	Title	Length
1.	"Intro"	1:16
2.	"Almighty Love"	3:47
3.	"Chris and Stevie"	5:58
4.	"Born Without Hate"	5:57
5.	"Bustin Outta Here"	5:41
6.	"Fire in the Glen"	4:47
7.	"Canadian Geese"	4:45
8.	"The Good and the Great"	6:46
9.	"Community"	5:51
10.	"Moneyman"	5:26
11.	"You're the Cure"	12:07
Total length:		62:32

A Deluxe Edition was also released, which included acoustic versions of Almighty Love, Community and Bustin Outta Here.

== Credits ==
All music and lyrics by Damien Dempsey apart from track 6 written by Andy M. Stewart and the poem on track 4 written by Kae Tempest.

- Damien Dempsey – acoustic and electric guitars, piano
- John Reynolds – piano, keyboards, drums
- Sinéad O'Connor – backing vocals
- Kae Tempest – rap on track 4
- Clare Kenny – bass
- Caroline Dale – cello
- Seán Regan – fiddle, viola
- John McLoughlin – mandolin, guitars
- Julian Wilson – keyboards, piano, hammond
