= To Hell or Barbados =

Album by Damien Dempsey

Studio album by Damien Dempsey
- Released: June 1, 2007 (Ireland); June 18, 2007 (UK); June 26, 2007 (US); July 6, 2007 (Canada)
- Recorded: AIR Studios, London
- Genres: Folk, reggae
- Length: 53:32
- Labels: Clear Records, UFO Music
- Producer: John Reynolds

Damien Dempsey chronology
Shots (2005)	To Hell or Barbados (00000001)	The Rocky Road (2008)

To Hell or Barbados is the fourth studio album by Irish singer-songwriter Damien Dempsey released in Ireland and the UK in June 2007. An expanded edition was released on 2 November 2007, complete with a bonus CD of additional material.

The album name and title track are taken from the book of the same name by Sean O'Callaghan, an account of the thousands of Irish people transported to the Caribbean during the Cromwellian conquest of Ireland.

The album features Irish folk musician Sharon Shannon and sisters Yamina and Nadia Nid El Mourid from the French band Lo'Jo

== Track listing ==
No.	Title	Length
1.	"Maasai"	3:58
2.	"Kilburn Stroll"	5:10
3.	"How Strange"	5:47
4.	"Chase the Light"	4:13
5.	"Your Pretty Smile"	4:15
6.	"Serious"	4:57
7.	"Teachers"	4:39
8.	"Summer's in My Heart"	4:58
9.	"To Hell or Barbados"	7:47
10.	"The City"	7:40
Total length:		53:32

== To Hell or Barbados: The Expanded Edition ==
Additional tracks:

1. "Not on Your Own Tonight (Part 2)"
2. "Saturday Finally Comes"
3. "Wild One"
4. "Schooldays Over"
5. "Fly Me to the Moon"
6. "Taobh Leis an Muir"
7. "The Rhythm of Time"
8. "Holy Night"

== Personnel ==
- Damien Dempsey - acoustic guitar
- Caroline Dale - cello
- John Reynolds - drums
- Sharon Shannon - accordion
- Marco Pirroni - guitar
- Claire Kenny - bass instrument
- Julian Wilson - Hammond b-3 organ
- Conor McKeon - pipes
- Nadia Nid El Mourid - background vocals
- Yamina Nid el Mourid
- Gerry O'Connor - banjo
