= Let the Truth Be Told (Laura Izibor album) =

Studio album by Laura Izibor
- Released: 8 May 2009
- Recorded: 2005–2009; Dublin, Ireland; New York City; Atlanta, Georgia; Philadelphia, Pennsylvania
- Genres: R&B, soul
- Length: 37:51
- Label: Atlantic
- Producers: Laura Izibor (exec.), Steve Lunt (exec.), Scott Jacoby, Craig Kallman, Chris "Tricky" Stewart

Singles from Let the Truth Be Told
- 1. "From My Heart to Yours" Released: November 3, 2008; 2. "Shine" Released: March 16, 2009; 3. "Don't Stay" Released: May 11, 2009; 4. "If Tonight Is My Last" Released: 2009

Professional ratings
Review scores
Source	Rating
About.com	3.5/5 stars
Allmusic	3/5 stars
The Belfast Telegraph	4/5 stars
The Boston Globe	(favorable)
GQ	(favorable)
The Observer	(mixed)
Paste	(74/100)
Sunday Mercury	(favorable)

Let the Truth Be Told is the debut album by Irish recording artist Laura Izibor. It was released on 8 May 2009, under Atlantic Records.

== Background ==
At the age of 15, Izibor was signed to Jive Records. She dropped out of school to record the album. From ages 17 to 18, Izibor recorded over half of the album. After a dispute with the Jive, she signed with Atlantic Records and subsequently moved to New York City after her mentor, Steve Lunt, was offered a job at the label.

== Recording ==
Let the Truth Be Told was recorded from 2005 to 2009; recording sessions took place in her hometown of Dublin, Ireland, to New York City, Atlanta and Philadelphia. Upon the album's UK release, noted R&B writer Pete Lewis of the award-winning 'Blues & Soul' stated "Anchored firmly in classic R&B, it effectively combines a reverence for the tradition of vintage, warm piano-driven soul with a fresh twist of modern sensibility. As can be heard on tracks ranging from the funky, uplifting 'From My Heart to Yours' and intense, groove-driven 'Don't Stay'; to the sincere, aching love lament 'If Tonight Is My Last'." The song "Shine" was originally written for The Nanny Diaries, but was added to the album after being pushed back several times.

== Track listing ==
All songs were written by Laura Izibor.

#	Title	Length
1	Shine	3:35
2	Don't Stay	3:59
3	If Tonight Is My Last	3:35
4	What Would You Do	4:34
5	From My Heart to Yours	3:47
6	Perfect World	4:36
7	The Worst Is Over	3:14
8	Yes (I'll Be Your Baby)	3:41
9	I Don't Want You Back	3:19
10	Mmm...	3:25

Deluxe edition bonus tracks

#	Title	Length
11	It Ain't Over ('Cos I Need You) (EP Version)	3:23
12	From My Heart to Yours (DJ Premier Remix Version)	3:43
13	Mmm... (Live From Crawdaddy, Dublin)	4:01

== Personnel ==
- Jo Archard – strings
- Iyiola Babalola – programming
- Andre Bowman – bass
- Jarrett Boyd – background vocals
- Ciaran Byrne – engineer
- David Campbell — string arrangements (track 2)
- Jeff Chestek – string engineer
- Tom Coyne – mastering
- Mark Crown – brass
- Jack Daley – bass
- Jonnie Davis "Most" – mixing
- Darius de Haas – background vocals
- Graham Dominy – engineer
- Tim Donovan – mixing
- Rachelle Dupéré – art direction, design
- John Ellis and His SDB – keyboards
- Paul Bryan Farr – guitar
- Serban Ghenea – mixing
- Larry Gold – string arrangements, string conductor
- Rob Gold – art manager
- David Harrigan – design
- Tommy Hayes – assistant engineer
- Marva Hicks – background vocals
- Laura Izibor – piano, arranger, vocals, background vocals, producer, executive producer, string arrangements
- Scott Jacoby – organ, bass, drums, Clavinet, producer, engineer, string arrangements, drum programming, mixing, Wurlitzer
- Tyrone Johnson – bass, guitar
- Joseph Joubert – organ, piano, arranger
- Craig Kallman – executive producer
- Edison Waters – executive producer
- Zev Katz – bass
- Jong On Oakki Lau – strings
- Darren Lewis – programming
- Cora Venus Lunny – violin, viola
- Steve Lunt – percussion, producer, executive producer, shaker, string arrangements, A&R
- P. Magnet
- Michael McElroy – choir arrangement
- Ken McHugh – vocal engineer
- Joi L. Pitts – marketing
- Gavin Ralston – guitar, programming, engineer
- Steven Wolf – drums, programming
- Brian Ranney – package production
- Clare Raybould – strings
- Tim Roberts – mixing assistant
- Saunders Sermons – trombone
- Chris Stang – marketing
- Billy Jay Stein – engineer, Wurlitzer, Hammond B3
- Chris "Tricky" Stewart – producer
- Phil Tan – mixing
- Peter "Real Strings" Whitfield – string arrangements

== Charts ==
Chart (2009)	Peak position
French SNEP Albums Chart	60
Irish Albums Chart	2
Japan (Oricon)	100
Dutch Albums Chart	64
UK Album Chart	100
U.S. Billboard 200	27
U.S. Billboard Top R&B/Hip-Hop Albums	6

"Shine" ranked number 24 on the 2009 year-end for Billboard's Japanese adult contemporary chart.

== Release history ==
Region	Date
Ireland	8 May 2009
Brazil	20 May 2009
United States	16 June 2009
