= Laura Izibor =

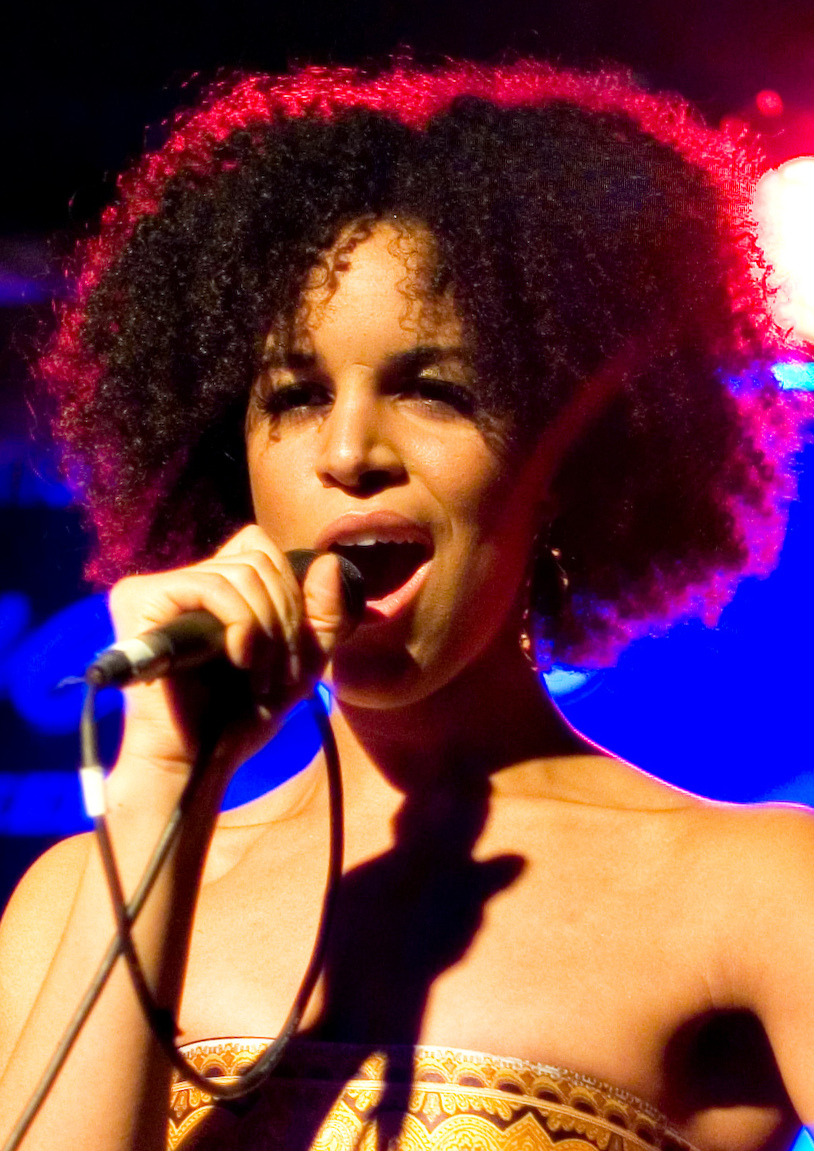

Background information
- Born: Laura Elizabeth Arabosa Izibor; 12 May 1987 (age 39); Dublin, Ireland
- Genres: R&B, soul, pop
- Occupations: Singer–songwriter, pianist, producer, arranger, composer
- Instruments: Vocals, piano
- Years active: 2008–2012
- Labels: Jive, Atlantic
- Website: www.lauraizibor.com

Laura Elizabeth Arabosa Izibor (born May 1987) is an Irish recording artist, musician and producer. She won the 2FM Song Contest while still in secondary school. She went on to win an award at the 2006 Meteor Music Awards. She also performed at that year's Electric Picnic music festival and Music Ireland 2007. Izibor has opened for Aretha Franklin, India Arie, Estelle, Maxwell, and John Legend on tour.

Her debut album, Let the Truth Be Told, was released in Ireland on 8 May 2009. Izibor has appeared in The CW television show, One Tree Hill, where she plays Erin Macree.

== Life and career ==
=== 1987–2003: Early life and career beginnings ===
Laura Elizabeth Arabosa Izibor was born in May 1987 in Dublin, Ireland. She is the fourth of five children born to Irish mother Trish and Nigerian father Saul. After singing "When You Believe", a duet by Mariah Carey and Whitney Houston, in her drama class, she discovered her interest for music; she began writing songs at age 13 and taught herself how to play the piano at 14. At age 15, Izibor won the Raidió Teilifís Éireann (RTÉ) 2FM Song Contest. Her winning song, "Compatible", received constant airplay after she won the competition. RTÉ also filmed a documentary of Izibor after winning the competition.

=== 2004–present: Let the Truth Be Told ===
At age 17, Izibor was signed to Jive Records and dropped out of school to record her debut album. After a dispute with the label, she signed with Atlantic Records and subsequently moved to New York after her mentor, Steve Lunt, was offered a job at the label. She won an award at the 2006 Meteor Music Award and became the first unsigned recording artist to receive a nomination. Izibor's debut album, Let the Truth Be Told, was released in May 2009. The album debuted at number two on the Irish Albums Chart. The album debuted on the U.K Album Chart at 100 and number 27 on the U.S Billboard 200. Her single "From My Heart to Yours" had been released six months earlier, on 10 November 2008 and peaked at number twenty-five on the U.S Billboard Hot R&B/Hip-Hop Songs. Her second single 'Shine' was released on 16 March 2009 and peaked at number twenty-one on the Irish Singles Chart. It remained in the charts for four weeks. The song had originally been written for the film The Nanny Diaries but was eventually added to the album. It featured on many television adverts, as well as television dramas. A third single "Don't Stay" was released on 11 May 2009 and peaked at number fifty-eight on the U.S Billboard Hot R&B/Hip-Hop Songs. 'If Tonight Is My Last' was announced as the album's fourth single but was never released. The song, however, featured on a commercial for U.S hit T.V show One Tree Hill and is considered one of Izibor's best songs. She was nominated for 'Best U.K Newcomer'at the MOBO Awards 2009 and 'Best Female Act' at the 2010 Meteor Awards, as well as 'Best Irish Pop Act'. She performed at Bestival 2009 on 11 September 2009 and at the Electric Picnic 2009 on 4 September 2009. She performed a new single 'Gracefully' at the Jazz Cafe in London, on 12 September. A little over a year later, on 19 October 2010, Izibor debuted her new single "Can't Be Loved" in the sixth episode of One Tree Hill's eighth season. The track was rumoured to be the lead single on Izibor's new album but she neither confirmed nor denied this. In an interview with music website Metromix, on 29 July 2011, Izibor revealed that the name of her second album would be Love, Learn, Live and would hopefully be released soon. However, by summer 2012, no album had been released. However, Izibor did release an EP on 7 August 2012, called The Brooklyn Sessions Vol. 1, which continued three songs: "Gracefully", "He'll Never Know" and "Ring".

== Film and television ==
- Her song "From My Heart to Yours" featured in an episode of Grey's Anatomy and the Vh1 reality series Tough Love.
- Her single "Shine" was the lead track for the movie The Nanny Diaries, and is currently used in the Hibernian Aviva commercial in the Republic of Ireland and in the Norwich Union (now Aviva) commercial in the United Kingdom. The CD's first-week chart position is 27 on the Billboard Top 200 Albums. Diana Ross is rumored to have recorded a duet with Izibor for the European edition of her upcoming album.
- Her song "Mmm..." is featured in Step Up 2: The Streets, Why Did I Get Married?, The Practice, One Tree Hill and Seven Pounds.
- Her song "Carousel" is featured on the P.S. I Love You soundtrack.
- Her song "If Tonight is my Last" was used as America's Best Dance Crew Season 4 elimination song.
- A video of her performing her song "Mmm..." was featured in an episode of Bones called "The Parts in the Sum of the Whole".

Laura debuted in One Tree Hill during the 8th Season (2010). Her song "Can't be Love", which she created specifically for the show, debuted during the 6th episode on 20 October 2010.

== Musical style ==
Izibor cites James Brown, Aretha Franklin and Carole King as her inspirations.

Izibor music has been compared to recording artists Aretha Franklin, Corinne Bailey Rae and Alicia Keys. Nicole Frehsée of Rolling Stone magazine described Izibor's debut album, Let the Truth Be Told, as "a sunny, chick-flick-worthy take on vintage soul". Noted UK R&B writer Pete Lewis of 'Blues & Soul' described the album as "Anchored firmly in classic R&B and effectively combining a reverence for the traditions of vintage, warm piano-driven soul with a fresh twist of modern sensibility". While Pete Daniel Smith of Sunday Mercury described the album as a "dazzling R&B debut", noting "a remarkable soul vocal that'll send shivers down your spine".

== Discography ==
- Let the Truth Be Told (2009)

== Awards and nominations ==
| Year | Nominee / work | Award | Result | Source |
|---|---|---|---|---|
| 2004 | RTÉ 2fm Song Contest 2004 | Best Newcomer | Won | |
| 2006 | Meteor Ireland Music Awards 2006 | Emerging Artist | Won | |
| 2009 | MOBO Awards | Best UK Newcomer | Nominated | |
| 2009 | Soul Train Music Awards | Centric Award – Soul Approved/Underground | Nominated | |
| 2010 | BET Awards | Best UK / IRISH ACT | Nominated | |
| 2010 | CHOICE MUSIC AWARD | Best Album | Nominated | |
