= The Rocky Road (album) =

Studio album by Damien Dempsey
- Released: June 6, 2008 (Ireland); June 7, 2008 (Australia); June 9, 2008 (UK)
- Genre: Folk
- Labels: SonyBMG Records, UFO Music
- Producer: John Reynolds

Damien Dempsey chronology
To Hell or Barbados (2007)	The Rocky Road (2008)	Almighty Love (2012)

The Rocky Road is the fifth studio album by Damien Dempsey. In The Rocky Road, Dempsey endeavours to pull together a fine collection of ballads, some well-known ('The Rocky Road to Dublin', 'The Foggy Dew') and others less-so ('Schooldays Over', 'Hot Asphalt'), while enrolling Dubliners John Sheahan and Barney McKenna to ensure the musicianship demonstrates familiarity and love for the songs selected. The album was released June 6, 2008, in Ireland on SonyBMG and on August 26 in the U.S. via United For Opportunity. The album has 11 tracks.

== Track listing ==
1. The Rocky Road To Dublin
2. Schooldays Over
3. A Rainy Night In Soho
4. The Twang Man
5. Sullivan John
6. Kelly From Killan/The Teetotaler
7. The Foggy Dew
8. Hot Asphalt
9. Night Visiting Song
10. The Hackler From Grouse Hall/The Monaghan Jig
11. Madam I'm A Darlin'
