= Shots (Damien Dempsey album) =

Studio album by Damien Dempsey
- Released: 11 March 2005 (Ireland); 14 March 2005 (UK)
- Length: 50:00
- Labels: Sony/BMG, UFO Music

Damien Dempsey chronology
Seize the Day (2003)	Shots (2005)	To Hell Or Barbados (2007)

Professional ratings
Review scores
Source	Rating
RTÉ	4/5 stars
CLUAS	7/10 stars

Shots is a 2005 studio album by the Irish singer-songwriter Damien Dempsey which was released in Ireland and the United Kingdom in March 2005. It is the third studio album released by the singer-songwriter. Brian Eno provides backing vocals on the opening track "Sing All Your Cares Away". The album discusses a diverse range of topics including oppression, slavery, drugs and poverty.

Shots entered the Irish Albums Chart at No. 1 and reached platinum status. It went on to receive one nomination at the 2006 Meteor Awards.

== Album information ==
Shots was Dempsey's third studio album, the successor to his 2003 platinum selling album Seize the Day which was the occasion during which his music became more noticed and appreciated. Since then he has received praise from musicians such as Christy Moore, Sinéad O'Connor and Shane MacGowan, whilst Morrissey invited him on tour with him in 2004. Shots was recorded in Rockfield Studio in Wales and produced by John Reynolds who has worked with Dempsey before.

== Song meanings ==
The third track on the album "St. Patrick's Day" begins with a guitar which slowly builds up into a combination of tin whistles, uilleann pipes and drums. It describes pre-Celtic Tiger era Ireland. The fifth track "Party On" discusses the negative aspect of Ireland's drugs culture. The sixth track, "Colony", is a song about oppression and colonialism which is reworked from Dempsey's debut album, They Don't Teach This Shit in School. The penultimate track, "Choctaw Nation", details the plight of the Native American Choctaw people, whilst the final track, "Spraypaint Backalley", features a line from Oscar Wilde – "we are all in the gutter but some of us are looking at the stars".

== Track listing ==
The album Shots contains ten tracks and is fifty minutes in length.

No.	Title	Length
1.	"Sing All Our Cares Away"
2.	"Not on Your Own Tonight"
3.	"St. Patrick's Day"
4.	"Cursed with a Brain"
5.	"Party On"
6.	"Colony"
7.	"Patience"
8.	"Hold Me"
9.	"Choctaw Nation"
10.	"Spraypaint Backalley"
Total length:		50:00

== Reaction ==
The national broadcaster RTÉ gave the album four stars out of five in its review, stating that his music "shows an astute observation of Irish life" and praising him for "giving a voice to the downtrodden". The songs "Sing All Our Cares Away", the opening track, and "Choctaw Nation", the penultimate one, were singled out for a special mention as was the new recording of "Colony". "Party On" was praised for its irony and sarcasm, whilst Dempsey's approach to the music business is covered in the single "Patience", with comparisons made to the track "I've No Alibi' from his debut album. The CLUAS reviewer noted that Shots was Dempsey's first step into mainstream music, with more melody present and "less anger". Opening track "Sing all Your Cares Away" received high praise for its "sweet melody", harmonies described as "soothing and gentle" and the backing vocals of Brian Eno, the love song "Hold Me" was described as "a gentle ode to love with none of the frills or soppy sentimentality of usual love ballads" and the seventh track "Patience" has been praised for its slow build-up into a full band.

== Chart performance ==
The album debuted on the Irish Albums Chart at No. 1, going on to achieve platinum status in December 2005.

Chart (2005)	Peak position
Irish Albums Chart	1

== Awards ==
=== Meteor Music Awards ===
On 23 November 2005, it was announced that Shots had been nominated for a Meteor Music Award in the Best Irish Album category. However, at the 2006 Meteor Awards on 2 February 2006, the album lost to U2's eleventh studio album, How to Dismantle an Atomic Bomb.

Year	Nominee / work	Award	Result
2006	Shots	Best Irish Album	Nominated
