= Don't Stay (Laura Izibor song) =

Single by Laura Izibor

from the album Let The Truth Be Told
- Released: May 11, 2009
- Genre: R&B, Soul, Pop
- Length: 3:59
- Label: Atlantic
- Songwriter: Laura Izibor
- Producer: Steve Lunt

Laura Izibor singles chronology
"Shine" (2009)	"Don't Stay" (2009)	"If Tonight Is My Last" (2009)

Don't Stay is the third single released by Irish R&B recording artist Laura Izibor, from her debut studio album Let The Truth Be Told.

== Music video ==
The music video for this song was released on June 16, 2009 and it was directed by Noble Jones. It starts with Laura singing and playing a piano while small sequences of her and her apparent boyfriend are arguing throughout the video. Nearing the end, it shows Izibor standing in front of an open door as her boyfriend leaves, with her closing the door as the clip ends.

== Charts ==
Chart (2009)	Peak position
U.S. Billboard Hot R&B/Hip-Hop Songs	58
