= 2007 royal blackmail plot =

2007 blackmail attempt in the United Kingdom

The 2007 royal blackmail plot was a UK scandal in which two men attempted to blackmail a relation of the British royal family. The relative of the royal family was alleged to have been involved in activities involving drug taking, and performing sexual activity on a male aide.

Buckingham Palace refused to comment on the situation after The Sunday Times reported the story on 28 October 2007. A spokesperson for the palace only stated that it was a police matter and that Scotland Yard was investigating.

The two defendants in the case were named as Sean McGuigan and Paul Aðalsteinsson. McGuigan, a recovering alcoholic, had previous criminal convictions and was originally from Ireland with republican connections. He was released from prison under the Good Friday Agreement in 1998. Aðalsteinsson held an Icelandic passport but also used the names Paul Stein and Charles Goldstein. Both men were arrested on 11 September 2007 charged under the Theft Act 1968 and was held in custody in Belmarsh Prison. They first applied for bail on 2 November, but this was refused. An appeal was also turned down on 8 December. They pleaded not guilty at the pre-trial hearing on 20 December 2007; the trial began at the old Bailey on 14 April 2008.

Both men were convicted on 2 May 2008 and sentenced to five years in prison. It was the first case of royal blackmail for more than a century, but the expensive trial was described as an "overreaction".

The trial was branded "a joke" and "a farce" by the men's lawyer Ronald Thwaites QC, who described the evidence against his clients as "insubstantial, insignificant, and incomplete," and said "you cannot convict people on evidence as poor as this." Police had obtained £50,000 in cash from public funds which was being held nearby by a "money man" to "flash" at the men should they make a demand for it, a demand which apparently never came, the court was told. The pair were arrested in a sting operation at a London hotel by undercover police officers from the Metropolitan police's counter-terrorism unit.

Aðalsteinsson was appealing the conviction when he was found dead at his flat in South Kensington, West London on Christmas Eve in 2016. A public inquest into his death on 30 June 2017 heard he had become a recreational drug user, developed an alcohol dependency issue and latterly became addicted to prescription drugs due to the amputation of a leg. The inquest found he had died after suffering respiratory failure brought on by multi-drug poisoning.
