= From My Heart to Yours (song) =

Single by Laura Izibor

from the album Let the Truth Be Told
- Released: 10 November 2008
- Genre: Soul, pop
- Length: 3:48
- Label: Atlantic
- Songwriter(s): Laura Izibor

Laura Izibor singles chronology
"From My Heart to Yours" (2008)	"Shine" (2009)

"From My Heart to Yours" is a song by Irish recording artist Laura Izibor. It was released as the lead single from her debut album, Let the Truth Be Told.

== Background ==
Izibor noted that "From My Heart to Yours" was "one of the easiest songs" she wrote. She explained the song, saying: "It just kinda came together really easily. It's about how you feel when you are in love and is a reflection of the whole experience." The song was used in the television series Grey's Anatomy.

== Reception ==
"From My Heart to Yours" received generally favorable reviews from music critics. Described as a "feisty" lead single, the song possesses "hip-poppy" characteristics. Irish newspaper Sligo Weekender praised the song for its being "an unforgettable melody coupled with an equally unforgettable voice". Dave Donnelly of Allmusic called the song impressive, but disliked the "irritating glitch vocal samples that litter" the song.

== Charts ==
=== Weekly charts ===
Chart (2009)	Peak position
U.S. Billboard Hot R&B/Hip-Hop Songs	25

=== Year-end charts ===
Chart (2009)	Position
US Hot R&B/Hip-Hop Songs (Billboard)	65
