= Hot Press =

Irish music and politics magazine

- Hot Press's "40th birthday" on the cover of the June 2017 issue
- Editor: Niall Stokes
- Categories: Music, current affairs
- Frequency: Monthly
- First issue: June 1977
- Country: Ireland
- Language: English
- Website: hotpress.com
- ISSN: 0332-0847

Hot Press is a monthly music and politics magazine based in Dublin, Ireland. Founded in June 1977 by Niall Stokes and Mairin Sheehy, the magazine has been edited by Stokes since its inception. Launched amid the punk era as an alternative to what its founders regarded as conservative mainstream coverage of rock music, Hot Press quickly established itself as more than a music title, combining reviews and artist interviews with commentary on Irish politics, social affairs and current events. Its first issue, featuring Rory Gallagher, appeared ahead of Ireland's first open-air rock festival at Macroom in June 1977, and the magazine has covered Irish and international musicians, from U2 and Thin Lizzy to The Cranberries and Sinéad O'Connor, ever since.

Hot Press has taken a broadly anti-establishment and left-of-centre editorial stance, with equality issues, including gay rights and reproductive rights, central to its coverage from an early stage. The magazine has published high-profile political interviews, including a 1990 interview with presidential candidate Mary Robinson that provoked national controversy, and an interview with Taoiseach Charles Haughey in 1984. It has also weathered its share of disputes, from a 2009 copyright row over the traditional group De Dannan's name to criticism of a 2009 interview with comedian Tommy Tiernan over remarks later perceived as antisemitic. Past and present contributors have included President Michael D. Higgins, journalist Bill Graham and the Father Ted writers Graham Linehan and Arthur Mathews, among others.

Beyond the magazine itself, Hot Press has produced an annual Yearbook, operated the short-lived Hot Press Music Hall of Fame in Dublin from 1999 to 2001, and organised the Stag/Hot Press Awards recognising Irish musical talent. The publication has also released several books drawn from its archive, including collections on Phil Lynott and Dolores O'Riordan. In 2026, Hot Press marked fifty years in print with a concert at Dublin's 3Arena and a new anthology of its interviews, History In The Making.

== History ==
=== Founding ===
Before establishing Hot Press, Niall Stokes had worked as a freelance journalist for Scene magazine, steering it towards rock music coverage, before concluding there was scope for a more frequent publication dedicated to rock music and the wider creative scene in Ireland. He founded Hot Press with a number of journalists he had worked with at Scene, including Bill Graham and Liam Mackey.

The early team worked from a flat on Earlsfort Terrace before securing an office on Upper Mount Street, Dublin, where a shortage of available telephone lines nearly derailed the launch, with the Department of Posts and Telegraphs initially informing them that no lines would be available for eighteen months. The problem was resolved after Stokes noted that the Dublin offices of Fianna Fáil and Fine Gael, located on the same street ahead of the 1977 Irish general election, had been granted numerous temporary lines; the Department subsequently allocated Hot Press three lines of its own.

The first issue of Hot Press, cover-dated 9 June 1977, featured Irish blues rock musician Rory Gallagher ahead of his headlining performance at Ireland's first open air rock festival, the Macroom Mountain Dew Festival. The cover, assembled as a photographic collage in the style of Sgt. Pepper's Lonely Hearts Club Band, depicted the Fine Gael-Labour coalition cabinet of the day alongside musicians including Bob Geldof, Phil Lynott, Patti Smith and Bob Marley, and also included a small photograph of two men kissing, a notable inclusion at a time when homosexual acts remained illegal in Ireland. As a matter of editorial policy, the magazine used its own photography for reviews and features rather than relying on agency images.

Hot Press positioned itself as an anti-establishment, left-of-centre publication aimed at young, urban readers with an interest in rock music, in contrast to what its founders regarded as arid and conservative coverage of popular music in the mainstream Irish press of the time. The magazine's coverage of U2 began in its earliest years; Horslips bassist Barry Devlin later credited a favourable review by Bill Graham, whom he called "the guy who got U2", with transforming the fortunes of the acts the magazine championed.

=== 1980s ===
Through the 1980s, Hot Press broadened its scope beyond music to cover politics, current affairs and social issues, retaining what one contemporary report described as a "sort of thoughtful aggression" in its journalism. The magazine also expanded into features on fashion and other lifestyle subjects during this period, a change staff at the time said had been well received.

From the early 1980s, Hot Press was associated with the Stag/Hot Press Awards, an annual ceremony recognising the achievements of Irish musicians on the international stage; early winners included U2, Thin Lizzy, Clannad, Auto Da Fé, The Undertones, Paul Brady, The Blades and Rory Gallagher. Winners were chosen by a panel of critics drawn from national newspapers, RTÉ Television, RTÉ Radio 2, the RTÉ Guide, Downtown Radio and Hot Press itself. At the fourth annual ceremony, held at the National Stadium in Dublin in September 1984 and hosted by Vincent Hanley, Moving Hearts, Christy Moore and Chris de Burgh each received awards for the first time, while Les Enfants and In Tua Nua shared the Best New Act award.

In 1984, Hot Press writer John Waters interviewed then-Taoiseach Charles Haughey, who spoke candidly about his frustrations with critics of his leadership.

=== 1990s ===
In September 1990, Hot Press published a widely reported interview with presidential candidate Mary Robinson, conducted by journalist Liam Fay, in which Robinson said she would be willing to officiate at the opening of a contraceptive stall in a Virgin Megastore and at the opening of a gay rights centre. Published at a time when the sale of condoms was legally restricted and homosexuality remained a criminal offence in Ireland, the interview was denounced by the Irish Press as "the longest suicide note in history", though the controversy had little lasting effect on Robinson's campaign, and she went on to become the first woman elected President of Ireland. Robinson later attributed some of the controversy to a habit of answering "yes" to indicate she had understood a question before elaborating her answer, a defence that became known as the "yes-mechanism". In 2024, to mark Robinson's 80th birthday, Hot Press republished the interview in full alongside a reflection by Fay on its impact.

In 1999, Niall Stokes oversaw the opening of the Hot Press Music Hall of Fame, an interactive museum on Middle Abbey Street, Dublin, celebrating Irish music and musicians, which was opened by Taoiseach Bertie Ahern and Caroline Corr of The Corrs. The Hall of Fame closed in October 2001.

=== 2000s ===
In 2000, Sinéad O'Connor first talked to Hot Press about being bisexual.

In June 2002, writing in The Irish Times to mark the magazine's 25th anniversary, John Waters, a former Hot Press contributor, argued that the magazine had failed to move with the times, criticising what he described as a dated preoccupation with sex, political correctness and left-wing politics. Waters went on to become a widely discredited commentator in Ireland, promoting far-right and conspiracy theories in his subsequent career.

Hot Press writer Stuart Clark was interviewing Oasis band member and songwriter Noel Gallagher when Gallagher found out that his brother Liam would not take the stage for that evening's performance, and the band came close to splitting up.

Hot Press was at the centre of a legal dispute over the copyright of the term De Dannan in 2009 after it featured an advertisement using the term to promote a new tour by the traditional group.

==== 2009 Tommy Tiernan antisemitism controversy ====
In September 2009, during a pre-performance Q&A at Electric Picnic in County Laois hosted by Olaf Tyaransen for Hot Press, Tommy Tiernan responded to a question about previous accusations of antisemitism by making remarks about the Holocaust, Jews, and the death of Christ, including the statement: "These Jews, these fucking Jew cunts... Fucking six million? I would have got 10 or 12 million out of that." He later apologised for any offence caused, saying the remarks had been taken out of context and were intended to illustrate his view that comedians should be "irresponsible and reckless" without isolated excerpts being treated as literal beliefs. The comments drew widespread condemnation from figures including Archbishop Diarmuid Martin, Ruairi Quinn, filmmaker Louis Lentin, and Holocaust Education Trust Ireland, who described them as offensive, insensitive, racist, or appalling. However, Niall Stokes and Tyaransen defended Tiernan, arguing that he was satirising antisemitism and that his remarks had been removed from their original context.

=== 2010s ===
In 2017, Hot Press marked its 40th anniversary with an exhibition of its covers, HP40, at the National Library of Ireland's National Photographic Archive in Temple Bar, featuring signed, restored prints spanning acts from Blur and Christy Moore to Radiohead and Enya, along with a wall displaying all forty of U2's Hot Press covers. Marking the anniversary, Stokes said equality issues, including gay rights, had been central to the magazine's editorial focus "right from the outset". Michael D. Higgins, who wrote for Hot Press for ten years before his election as President of Ireland, described the magazine as representing "counter culture at its best" and said it remained an important voice in Irish life.

==== Laura Lee/Olaf Tyaransen controversy ====
In late 2017, Laura Lee, a sex worker and sex workers' rights campaigner, made a complaint to the Garda Síochána that Olaf Tyaransen had sexually assaulted her in 2014 when they met for a Hot Press interview. In February 2018, Lee died by suicide; two weeks later, her allegation was reported on Medium.com by Brooke Magnanti and widely repeated online. Tyaransen said he had consensual sex with Lee on the night he interviewed her for Hot Press, and sued Magnanti, Twitter, and Broadsheet.ie for defamation. Several of those who had repeated the allegations deleted them and issued apologies.

Tyaransen claims the allegations ruined his career. He stopped writing for Hot Press by mutual agreement although, according to him, the magazine continued to pay him for two years. He wrote an account presenting the events as an unjust cancellation by dogpiling misuse of the #MeToo movement. His book was due to be published in autumn 2025 as Me & #MeToo: A true story based on a false story, but has been deferred to 2026 by the publishers after threats of defamation proceedings from Hot Press, its editor Niall Stokes, and a solicitor who had advised Laura Lee. Responding to Tyaransen's admission of having had sex with Lee after interviewing her, the developers of a sex-worker safety app commented that "journalists should maintain clear professional boundaries with the people they interview".

=== 2020s ===
In 2020, in reaction to the COVID-19 pandemic lock down in Ireland, Hot Press held a set of online music sessions called the Lockdown Sessions featuring artists such as Celaviedmai, Doppler, and Tebi Rex.

Stokes was later awarded an honorary Doctor of the University degree by the Open University in Ireland, presented at a ceremony in Croke Park, Dublin, marking the first Open University graduation event held in Ireland since the start of the COVID-19 pandemic. The university cited Stokes' role in Irish cultural and political life, including editorial support over the years for causes such as access to contraception, marriage equality, and the campaign to repeal the Eighth Amendment.

In July 2022, to mark the magazine's 45th anniversary, Hot Press writers selected 45 singles, one for each year of the magazine's existence, in a retrospective feature covering acts from the Sex Pistols to TLC.

In February 2023, Stokes and Sheehy were presented with the Outstanding Contribution to the Irish Music Industry Award by the Irish Music Rights Organisation (IMRO) at the Radio Days Ireland conference in Dublin, recognising Hot Press's support for Irish musicians through its publishing activities, showcase platforms and lobbying efforts, including its role in establishing Irish Music Month, a partnership between Hot Press, 25 Irish radio stations and the Broadcasting Authority of Ireland. Sheehy recalled that, in the magazine's early years, its mailing list of London record labels helped alert the international music industry to the strength of the Irish scene, coinciding with the emergence of a band then known as The Hype, which changed its name to U2 a year after Hot Press was founded.

Hot Press marked the 50th anniversary of its founding beginning in February 2026. On 6 February 2026, the magazine held a celebratory concert, History In The Making, at Dublin's 3Arena, featuring performers including Van Morrison, The Boomtown Rats, The Frames, Clannad, Dermot Kennedy, Imelda May, Damien Dempsey, Denise Chaila, Picture This and Michael D. Higgins. Stokes said the magazine had always aimed to be about not just the music, but "life, love, politics, social issues and so on".

As part of the anniversary, Hot Press announced History In The Making: The Book of Hot Press Interviews, a limited-edition hardback collection of 20 interviews from the magazine's archive, including with Charlie Haughey, Gay Byrne, Gerry Adams, Mary Robinson, Michael D. Higgins and Sinéad O'Connor, with shipping planned for summer 2026. The book followed two earlier Hot Press publications, Philip Lynott: Still In Love With You and Covered In Glory: The Hot Press Covers Book.

== Contributors ==
Past writers for Hot Press have included ninth President of Ireland Michael D. Higgins, the authors of BAFTA award-winning Father Ted, Graham Linehan and Arthur Mathews, The Sunday Times television reviewer Liam Fay, author and Daily Telegraph columnist Neil McCormick, Bill Graham, The Sunday Business Post US correspondent Niall Stanage, Irish Examiner soccer correspondent Liam Mackey, author Damian Corless, the former The Irish Times columnist John Waters and film critic Tara Brady, food writer John McKenna, Sunday Independent columnist Declan Lynch and The Guardian football writer, Football Weekly regular Barry Glendenning, Daily Mail writer Jason O'Toole and Olaf Tyaransen.

== Politics ==
Hot Press has been described as taking an anti-establishment, left-of-centre stance on politics and social issues. During the 2007 general election it supported many smaller left wing parties such as the Green Party and Labour. It was critical of the then Fianna Fáil government, pro-Seanad reform and was opposed to the June 2007 decision of the Irish Film Censor's Office to ban the videogame Manhunt 2. This is the first time a video game has been refused certification by the IFCO.

The magazine has interviewed several politicians, including Sinn Féin's Gerry Adams, DUP's Ian Paisley Jr MLA, leader of the Green Party, John Gormley and Minister for Finance, Brian Cowen.

The sort of smug know-all commentator... I suppose if anything annoys me, that annoys me... I could instance a load of fuckers whose throat I'd cut, and push over the nearest cliff, but there's no percentage in that. – Former Taoiseach Charles Haughey speaking to Hot Press writer John Waters in 1984.

In his May 2007 interview with Jason O'Toole, former Minister for Health Cowen admitted to smoking marijuana, saying,

Anyone who went to the UCD bar in the '70s that didn't get a whiff of marijuana would be telling you a lie. I would say there were a couple of occasions when it was passed around – and, unlike President Clinton, I did inhale! There wasn't a whole lot in it really – (it was like) a Sweet Afton, as a 10-year-old, under a railway bridge on a rainy day, in small town Ireland in the late '60s. I certainly got more enjoyment out of a few pints.

This confession later provoked much criticism from opposition parties in the Dáil. Ministers Willie O'Dea and Brian Lenihan Jnr played down the controversy, denying Cowen was "setting a bad example". Mr. Cowen later became Taoiseach following the resignation of Bertie Ahern.

In June 2007, DUP's Ian Paisley Jr MLA caused uproar in an interview with Jason O'Toole by publicly denouncing acts associated with homosexuality. This was the year before Iris Robinson, wife of First Minister, Peter Robinson made her thoughts on the issue.

== Hotpress.com ==
Hotpress.com is the magazine's website which as of this writing offers free articles to readers. It was launched in 2002, initially promising a free archive with 25 years of content.

== Hot Press Yearbook ==
The Hot Press Yearbook is released annually.

== Books ==
Hot Press has published several books:

- A Man in a Woman's World by Jackie Hayden, general manager of Hot Press (co-published in Nov 2007 with Killynon House Books.)
- Diary of a Man, by Dermod Moore, 2005. A collection of essays by the magazine's columnist aka Bootboy.
- The Palace of Wisdom (Sex Lines & The Story of O), by Olaf Tyaransen (2004, 2002, 2000)
- McCann: War & Peace in Northern Ireland, by Eamonn McCann, 1998.
- My Boy, by Philomena Lynott with Jackie Hayden, 1996 Synopsis: The story of Phil Lynott as told by his mother. It is also her story, from the days as a single mother bringing up a young black child in Manchester and Dublin, through the heady success of Thin Lizzy, to the tragic chain of events which ended her son's life and plunged her into depression.
- Why Can't We? – The Story of The Cranberries and the Band's Iconic Frontwoman Dolores O'Riordan by Niall Stokes and Stuart Clark, 2021. Available in two formats, including a limited Deluxe Platinum Limited Edition autographed by surviving band members and the mother of Dolores O'Riordan, who died in 2018.
- Power To The People: The Hot Press Years by Michael D. Higgins, with foreword by Niall Stokes, 2024. Available in two formats and autographed by the author.
- Covered In Glory: The Hot Press Covers Book, an earlier volume gathering historic Hot Press cover artwork.
- Philip Lynott: Still In Love With You, an earlier volume on the Thin Lizzy frontman.
- History In The Making: The Book of Hot Press Interviews, edited by Niall Stokes, a limited-edition collection of 20 interviews from the magazine's archive published to mark its 50th anniversary, with shipping planned for summer 2026.
- In addition, Crime Ink, by Jason O'Toole, 2009, is a collection of O'Toole's Hot Press pieces published by Merlin Publishing, which made the top ten of the Irish Bestsellers Chart.

== See also ==
- List of magazines in Ireland
- Music of Ireland
- Politics of the Republic of Ireland
