= They Don't Teach This Shit in School =

Studio album by Damien Dempsey
- Released: 13 March 2000
- Genre: Folk rock
- Label: Zincfence; Clear

Damien Dempsey chronology
They Don't Teach This Shit in School (2000)	Seize the Day (2003)

They Don't Teach This Shit in School is the debut album by Damien Dempsey released in March 2000 on the Zincfence label.

The album contains a re-recorded version of one of his best-known singles, "Dublin Town". They Don't Teach This Shit in School was re-issued in October 2005 on the Sony BMG label in Ireland, IRL in the UK, and UFO Music/Clear Records in the U.S.

The album has now been deleted.

== Tracks ==
1. "Jealousy"
2. "NYC Paddy"
3. "Colony"
4. "Seanchai"
5. "I've No Alibi"
6. "Chillin'"
7. "It's Important"
8. "Bad Time Garda"
9. "It's All Good"
10. "They Don't Teach This Shit in School"
11. "Dublin Town"
12. "Beside the Sea"
