= Seize the Day (album) =

Studio album by Damien Dempsey
- Released: 16 May 2003
- Genre: Folk rock
- Length: 53:00
- Label: Clear
- Producer: John Reynolds

Damien Dempsey chronology
They Don't Teach This Shit In School (2000)	Seize the Day (2003)	Shots (2005)

Professional ratings
Review scores
Source	Rating
AllMusic	3/5 stars

Seize the Day is an album by Damien Dempsey released in Ireland in 2003 on Clear Records via Sony. In the UK, it was released via IRL and, in the US, it was released on Attack Records, a subsidiary of Sanctuary Records. In the UK and US, the title track was not hidden.

Two tracks – "Factories" and "Seize the Day" – appeared on the soundtrack to the Irish crime film Between the Canals, in which Dempsey made his debut acting performance.

== Track listing ==
1. "Negative Vibes" – 4:44
2. "Ghosts of Overdoses" – 4:41
3. "It's All Good" – 4:21
4. "Factories" – 5:17
5. "Jar Song" – 5:03
6. "Celtic Tiger" – 5:13
7. "Apple of My Eye" – 3:43
8. "Industrial School" – 5:27
9. "Great Gaels of Ireland" – 5:21
10. "Marching Season Siege" – 3:24
11. "Seize the Day" (hidden track) – 4:12

The tracks "Celtic Tiger", "It's All Good" and "Negative Vibes" feature backing vocals by Sinéad O'Connor.

== Personnel ==
- Damien Dempsey – vocals, acoustic guitar, electric guitar
- Brian Eno – guitar
- Justin Adams – electric guitar
- Paolo Baconi – slide guitar
- Rob Ó Géibheannaigh – banjo, flute, whistle
- Kieran Kiely – whistle, accordion, piano, organ
- Lucy Shaw – bass instrument
- Clare Kenny – bass guitar
- Emmet Dempsey – bodhrán
- Sinéad O'Connor – background vocals

== Charts ==
2023 chart performance for Seize the Day
Chart (2023)	Peak position
Irish Albums (OCC)	1
