= Damien Dempsey =

Irish singer and songwriter

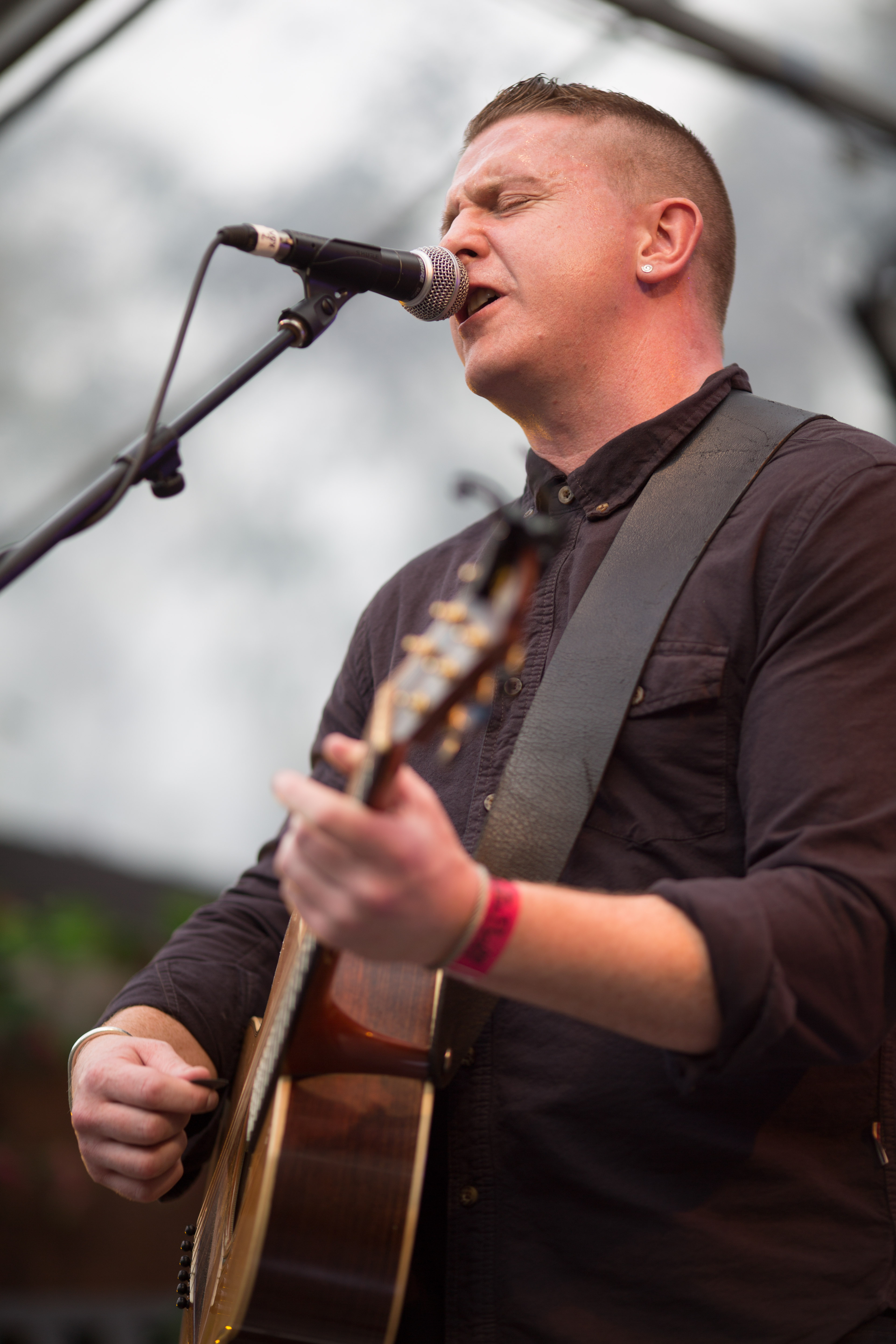
- Dempsey performing at Gumball Festival in April 2014

Background information
- Born: 9 July 1975 (age 51); Donaghmede, Dublin, Ireland
- Origin: Dublin, Ireland
- Genres: Irish, folk, traditional, reggae
- Occupations: Singer-songwriter, guitarist
- Instruments: Guitar, keyboards, vocals
- Years active: 1995–present
- Labels: IRL (Independent Records Ltd), UFO Music, Planet, Sony BMG, FOUR FOUR

Damien Dempsey (born 9 June 1975) is an Irish singer and songwriter who mixes traditional Irish folk contemporary lyrics that deliver social and political commentaries on Irish society. Damien sings in his native, working-class accent in the English language, and to a lesser extent in the Irish language. Damien has worked with many other artists in is career with people such as Eddie Sherlock, Sinéad O'Connor, Brian Eno, and many more.

Dempsey was born and raised in Donaghmede, a Northside suburb of Dublin. His father was a panel beater while his mother had a variety of jobs in the area.

His earliest musical influences came from the post-pub musical sessions that were held in his parents' house when he was a toddler. This developed into a love of artists such as Christy Moore, Luke Kelly, Shane MacGowan, Bob Marley and Elvis Presley. Shy as a teenager, Dempsey retreated to his bedroom where he spent his time honing his singing and guitar playing. He soon started to pen his own songs, testing the water on his pleasantly surprised family with "a song about smog". His family encouraged him to enter the 2FM Song Contest, and he came second with "Cardboard City", a song of his own about homelessness.

Although hugely taken with the Irish folk tradition, it was Bob Marley who inspired Dempsey during some of his darker times:

"I was in my teens and I was going through a bit of a phase, drinking a lot and doing E tablets and getting into street fighting and getting depressed. Then I'd listen to Marley and it lifted me out of it. I'd like to try [to] do the same for kids, that my music would give them a bit of hope and strength, and they'd know that I was telling the truth and I wouldn't lie to them."

— Damien Dempsey

Growing up on the northside of Dublin, Dempsey trained along with his older brothers, and competed for Dublin as an amateur boxer before committing himself to studying music.

Dempsey attended secondary school at Mount Temple Comprehensive School, sharing classes with model Amanda Brunker. He then went on to Ballyfermot College of Further Education – the "Rock School" – for two years before graduating in 1995. There he studied musical performance and management and his first EP, The Contender, was released in 1995 on the school's record label.

Unemployed and on the dole for several years, Dempsey was a regular visitor to the library in Donaghmede where he read about Irish history and developed a lasting appreciation for the "seanchaí" – the Irish storyteller.

== Musical career ==
One of his songs was included in an album by his Ballyfermot school, and he mimed it at a promotional concert. In the following period, he performed at bars and clubs, sometimes having to "pay to play", sometimes earning a little. His first commercial single "Dublin Town" was released in 1997, and reached number 18 on the Irish music charts. The Irish music magazine Hot Press praised the single, remarking that it was "an underground anthem for disaffected youth and closet balladeer alike". His first full-length album, titled They Don't Teach This Shit in School, was released in 2000 and contained a re-recorded version of this song; it was not a commercial success. He took a break from performing and moved to New York, working in an Irish bar there.

Returning to Dublin Dempsey was invited by producer and musician John Reynolds to record at his London home studio, and Reynolds produced a CD with backing vocals by Sinéad O'Connor and a guitar riff by Brian Eno. Sinéad O'Connor invited him out on tour with her and championed him as one to watch. "I don't think there's ever been anyone like him. I think he represents the sort of voice in Ireland that is not allowed to be heard", she said. Dempsey later joked on stage that when he got the call from O'Connor to join the tour, he assumed it would be on the door as a bouncer.

His next release, in 2002, the Negative Vibes EP, featured O'Connor on the title track, and led to an invitation to support her on her 2002/2003 Irish, UK, and European tour. Dempsey's second full-length album, Seize the Day, was released in May 2003 in Ireland on Clear Records via Sony and entered the charts in its first week of release at No. 5. It has since achieved double-platinum sales.

In 2004 Dempsey toured extensively, headlining his own shows as well as supporting Bob Dylan during the Irish leg of his European tour, and making his debut appearances at The (London) Fleadh and Womad.

He has earned the support of his peers, particularly Morrissey, who invited Dempsey to support him at the Meltdown festival and on various UK and Irish dates as well as his autumn 2004 US tour. Morrissey went on to sign Dempsey to his label (Attack), and Seize the Day had its US release in October 2004. His third album, Shots, simultaneously released in Ireland and the UK in March 2005, entered the Irish album charts at No. 1.

At Oxegen 2006, on the main stage on Saturday afternoon, Dempsey said that Patrick Pearse would be "turning in his grave" at the state of modern Ireland. This sparked off controversy.

He supported English folk-rock band The Levellers on their UK tour in the spring of 2006 as well as playing at The Levellers' music festival Beautiful Days in August 2006. Dempsey's first live album, Live at the Olympia, was released in June 2006 in Ireland and the UK. The album was recorded at Dublin's Olympia Theatre on 15 December 2005. Sean Buckley can be heard shouting "come on damo" during the song, apple of my eye

Shots was released in the US on the United For Opportunity label in June 2006 and Dempsey undertook a coast-to-coast tour. On the Fleadh 2007 tour Dempsey, along with Sharon Shannon's Big Band, toured Ireland and the UK with Willie Nelson. His fourth studio album, To Hell or Barbados, released in June 2007, entered the Irish album chart at No. 2. An extended version of the album, which included a bonus CD featuring previously unreleased and rare tracks, was released in Ireland via Sony BMG in November 2007.

Dempsey's fifth studio album, a covers album entitled The Rocky Road, was released on 6 June 2008 in Ireland via Sony BMG, with a UK release via IRL on 9 June 2008 and on 26 August via United for Opportunity. The lead single "A Rainy Night in Soho", a cover of the Pogues' track, was released on 30 May 2008. His sixth studio album, Almighty Love, was released in October 2012 and entered the chart at No. 3, with the single of the same name released in mid-October.

In 2014, Dempsey released a best-of album titled It's All Good which entered the chart at No. 1. During the Australian leg of his tour promoting this album, he appeared on an episode of the comedy-music panel show Spicks and Specks. In 2016, Dempsey released an album titled No Force On Earth of original and covered songs to commemorate the centenary of The 1916 Rising. The album featured the traditional song "James Connolly" which Dempsey had become known for singing at recent protests to water charges introduced by the Irish government. Other songs on the album included one written for his great-aunt Jennie Shanahan who fought in the 1916 rising along with a song to commemorate an ancestor of his friend, Love/Hate actor John Connors, who also fought in the rebellion. The album was initially only made available to buy at live concerts with a limited run of 2016 copies only being produced.

No Force on Earth also includes a song about the 1967–1975 Wave Hill walk-off in Australia, when 200 Gurindji workers staged a walk-off and strike from Wave Hill cattle station for better working conditions and the return of their land. Dempsey is friends with Australian singer-songwriter Dan Sultan.

As of 2021, Dempsey is signed to Australian independent music label FOUR FOUR.

On 25th October 2024, Dempsey returned with the double album "Hold Your Joy". Hot Press gave the album 9/10 noting "Indisputably, this is an artist at the top of his game."

=== Covers ===
Many artists have covered Damien Dempsey's work, including Sinead O'Connor, The Proclaimers and The Wonder Stuff's Miles Hunt. His songs have been featured on many TV shows, including Sons of Anarchy, Fair City, the BAFTA-winning Tyrannosaur and, most recently, Broken Law.

The song "Damo", written by Amy Ray of the Indigo Girls, which features on the band's 2011 album Beauty Queen Sister, is about Dempsey and features him on guest vocals, as well as his regular bassist Claire Kenny, who had also worked with the Indigo Girls regularly since 1999, and drummer/producer John Reynolds.

== Discography ==
- They Don't Teach This Shit in School (2000)
- Seize the Day (2003)
- Shots (2005)
- To Hell or Barbados (2007)
- The Rocky Road (2008)
- Almighty Love (2012)
- It's All Good – The Best of Damien Dempsey (2014)
- No Force On Earth (2016)
- Soulsun (2017)
- Union (2018)
- Hold Your Joy (2024)
- Holywell (2026)

== Film ==
The Irish crime film Between the Canals featured Dempsey's debut performance as an actor. He played the fictional Dublin crime boss Paul Chambers. The film has been well received by critics; The Irish Times stated that the film "has all the raw, angry energy of the great man's roaring songs." The film was released in cinemas in March 2011.

He appeared in the 2017 Irish crime film Cardboard Gangsters.

His song "St. Patrick's Day" was featured in the 2014 movie Patrick's Day.

== Documentary ==
A 2003 documentary, It's All Good: The Damien Dempsey Story, by independent filmmaker Dara McCluskey, followed Dempsey's career progression up to the release of Seize the Day. It was broadcast on Ireland's national television station RTÉ in 2004 and shown at film festivals in Ireland and in New York.

== Awards and nominations ==
Damien Dempsey awards and nominations
Awards and nominations
Award	Wins	Nominations
Meteor Music	6	11

Totals (Note: Certain award groups do not simply award one winner. They acknowledge several different recipients, have runners-up, and have third place. Since this is a specific recognition and is different from losing an award, runner-up mentions are considered wins in this award tally. For simplification and to avoid errors, each award in this list has been presumed to have had a prior nomination.)
- Wins: 6
- Nominations: 11

Nominated in four categories in the 2004 Irish Meteor Music Awards, Dempsey walked away with two, the only 2004 double winner. In 2006 and 2007, he added to his collection of Meteor Awards when he won Best Irish Male. He was also nominated in two categories in the Irish Meteor Awards 2008 and won "Best Folk/Traditional".

=== Meteor Music Awards ===
Year	Nominee / work	Award	Result
2004	Damien Dempsey	Best Folk/Traditional Act	Won
2004	Damien Dempsey	Best Irish Country/Roots Artist	Won
2004	Damien Dempsey	Best Irish Male	Nominated
2004	Seize the Day	Best Irish Album	Nominated
2006	Damien Dempsey	Best Irish Male	Won
2006	Shots	Best Irish Album	Nominated
2007	Damien Dempsey	Best Irish Male	Won
2008	Damien Dempsey	Best Folk/Traditional Act	Won
2008	Damien Dempsey	Best Irish Male	Nominated
2009	Damien Dempsey	Best Folk/Traditional Act	Won
2009	Damien Dempsey	Best Irish Male	Nominated
