= 2004 Meteor Awards =

Irish music awards ceremony

- Date: 1 March 2004
- Location: Point Theatre
- Country: Ireland
- Presented by: Dara Ó Briain

Television/radio coverage
- Network: Network 2

The 2004 Meteor Music Awards were held on Monday 1 March 2004, hosted by comedian Dara Ó Briain. It was the fourth edition of Ireland's national music awards.

At the ceremony Damien Dempsey was presented with two awards, Best Folk/Traditional Act and Best Irish Country/Roots Artist. Samantha Mumba made an appearance in a revealing see-through dress, Colin Farrell was pictured with both Bono and Chris Pontius whilst Red Hot Chili Peppers drummer Chad Smith posed with Sharon Corr after both collected awards.

Performers included Lionel Richie, Katie Melua, Counting Crows, The Corrs, Sugababes, Westlife, Hothouse Flowers, The Frames, The Dubliners, Snow Patrol, Paddy Casey and Jerry Fish and the Mudbug Club. Award presenters included Dominic West, Bic Runga and Alex Zane, actors George McMahon and Patrick Bergin, No Frontiers presenter Kathryn Thomas alongside Kerry McFadden, Miss World Rosanna Davison, Keith Duffy, Niall Quinn, Deirdre O'Kane, Denis Hickie, Joe Elliott and Hector Ó hEochagáin. The event was broadcast on Network 2 on Wednesday 3 March at 21:00.

== Winners ==
- Best Irish Radio DJ: Ryan Tubridy
  - Ian Dempsey
  - Donal Dineen
  - Tom Dunne
  - Dave Fanning
  - John Kelly
- Best Irish Band: The Frames
  - Bell X1
  - Future Kings of Spain
  - The Thrills
  - Snow Patrol
  - The Tycho Brahe
- Best Irish Pop Act: Westlife
  - D-Side
  - Hazel Kaneswaran
  - Ronan Keating
  - Simon Casey
- Best Irish Album: The Thrills, So Much for the City
  - Paddy Casey, Living
  - Bell X1, Music in Mouth
  - Damien Dempsey, Seize the Day
  - The Frames, Set List
  - David Kitt, Square 1
- Best Irish Female: Cara Dillon
  - Moya Brennan
  - Carol Keogh
  - Róisín Murphy
  - Sinéad O'Connor
- Best Irish Male: Paddy Casey
  - Damien Dempsey
  - Glen Hansard
  - Mickey Joe Harte
  - David Kitt
- Best Folk/Traditional Act: Damien Dempsey
  - Cara Dillon
  - Kíla
  - Lúnasa
  - Sharon Shannon
- Best Irish Country/Roots Artist: Damien Dempsey
  - Daniel O'Donnell
  - Frank Lane
  - Declan Nerney
  - Finbar Furey
- Best Irish New Act: Future Kings of Spain
  - D-Side
  - Woodstar
  - Laura Isibor
  - Rosey
  - Simple Kid
- Best Live Performance: Red Hot Chili Peppers
  - David Bowie
  - Coldplay
  - The Rolling Stones
  - Bruce Springsteen
  - Justin Timberlake
- Best International Female: Beyoncé
  - Britney Spears
  - Dido
  - Kylie Minogue
  - Erin McKeown
  - Missy Elliott
- Best International Male: Justin Timberlake
  - David Bowie
  - Nick Cave
  - Justin Hawkins
  - Josh Ritter
  - Robbie Williams
- Best International Group: The Darkness
  - The Black Eyed Peas
  - Kings of Leon
  - Outkast
  - The Strokes
  - The White Stripes
- Best International Album: The White Stripes, Elephant
  - Radiohead, Hail to the Thief
  - Kings of Leon, Youth & Young Manhood
  - The Darkness, Permission to Land
  - Outkast, Speakerboxxx/The Love Below
  - Blur, Think Tank
- Humanitarian Award: Sister Stanislaus Kennedy aka 'Sister Stan'
- Hope for 2004: Republic Of Loose
- Industry Award: Dave Fanning
- Lifetime Achievement Award: The Dubliners
