= List of awards and nominations received by Westlife =

Westlife awards and nominations
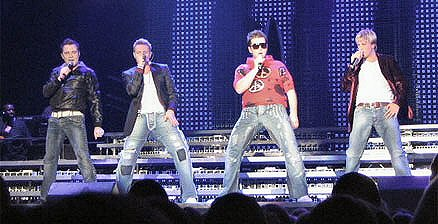
- The band on their 2006 concert tour
Awards and nominations
Award	Wins	Nominations
MTV Europe	1	3
Brit Awards	2	6
Meteor Awards	14	0
World Music Awards	1	3
Record of the Year	4	4

Totals (Note: Certain award groups do not simply award one winner. They acknowledge several different recipients, have runners-up, and have third place. Since this is a specific recognition and is different from losing an award, runner-up mentions are considered wins in this award tally. For simplification and to avoid errors, each award in this list has been presumed to have had a prior nomination.)
- Wins: 97
- Nominations: 21

This is a comprehensive list of awards which Westlife has won or was nominated for since 1998.

== BRIT Awards ==
The BRIT Awards are the British Phonographic Industry's annual pop music awards. Westlife has won two awards from six nominations. Westlife are the second most successful Irish act at the BRITs next to U2.

Year	Award	Nominee/work	Result
2001	Best International Newcomer	Westlife	Nominated
2001	Best International Group	Westlife	Nominated
2001	Best Pop Act	Westlife	Won
2002	Best Pop Act	Westlife	Won
2005	Best Pop Act	Westlife	Nominated
2006	Best Pop Act	Westlife	Nominated

== BT Digital Music Awards ==
Year	Award	Nominee/work	Result
2008	Best Official Website	http://www.westlife.com	Won

== Capital FM/Radio Awards ==
Year	Award	Nominee/work	Result
2000	Best International Newcomer	Westlife	Won
2001	Best International Group	Westlife	Won
2002	Best International Group	Westlife	Won
2003	Best International Group	Westlife	Won
2003	Best Website	http://www.westlife.com	Won

== Clear Awards ==
Year	Award	Nominee/work	Result
2001	Top 10 International Hitmaker	Westlife	Won

== Digital Awards ==
Year	Award	Nominee/work	Result
2002	People's Choice Award for Best Official Website	http://www.westlife.com	Won
2004	People's Choice Award for Best Official Website	http://www.westlife.com	Won

== Disney Kids Awards ==
Year	Award	Nominee/work	Result
2000	Best Male Group	Westlife	Won
2001	Best Male Group/Artist	Westlife	Won
2001	Group of the Year	Westlife	Won

== ECHO Awards ==
The ECHO Awards are a German music award show created in 1992. Each year's winner is determined by the previous year's sales. Westlife received one nomination.

Year	Award	Nominee/work	Result
2002	Best International Rock/Pop Group	Westlife	Nominated

== G.A.Y. Awards ==
Year	Award	Nominee/work	Result
2003	Sexiest Group in Planet Pop	Westlife	Won
2003	Most Gay-Friendly Boyband	Westlife	Won
2003	Hottest Irish Group	Westlife	Won

== Goss.ie Awards ==
Year	Award	Nominee/work	Result
2019	Best Music Act	Westlife	Won
2020	Best Music Act	Westlife	Won
2021	Best Music Act	Westlife	Nominated
2022	Best Music Act	Westlife	Won
2023	Best Music Act	Westlife	Won
2026	Best Music Act	Westlife	Won

== Heineken/Hot Press Awards (Ireland) ==
Year	Award	Nominee/work	Result
1999	Best Newcomer	Westlife	Won

== Hit Awards ==
Year	Award	Nominee/work	Result
2000	Best International Group	Westlife	Won

== Hot Press Irish Music Awards ==
Year	Award	Nominee/work	Result
2002	Outstanding Achievement In Popular Music	Westlife	Won

== Interactive Music Awards ==
Year	Award	Nominee/work	Result
2003	Best Website	http://www.westlife.com	Won

== IFPI (Hong Kong) ==
Year	Award	Nominee/work	Result
2002	Top Sales Music Award	World of Our Own	Won
2007	Top Sales Music Award	The Love Album	Won

== Irish Buzz WKD Awards ==
Year	Award	Nominee/work	Result
2002	Best Irish Band	Westlife	Won

== Meteor Music Awards ==
The Meteor Music Awards was an accolade bestowed upon professionals in the music industry in Ireland.

Year	Award	Nominee/work	Result
2001	Best Irish Pop Act	Westlife	Won
2002	Best Irish Pop Act	Westlife	Won
2002	Best Irish Pop Album	World of Our Own	Won
2002	Best Irish Pop Single	Uptown Girl	Won
2003	Best Irish Pop Act	Westlife	Won
2004	Best Irish Pop Act	Westlife	Won
2005	Best Irish Pop Act	Westlife	Won
2006	Best Irish Pop Act	Westlife	Won
2007	Best Irish Pop Act	Westlife	Won
2008	Best Irish Pop Act	Westlife	Won
2009	Best Irish Pop Act	Westlife	Won
2010	Best Irish Pop Act	Westlife	Won

== Mnet Music Video Festival ==
An award presented annually by CJ E&M Pictures.

Year	Award	Nominee/work	Result
2001	Mnet Asian Music Award for Best International Artist	Westlife	Nominated

== MTV Awards ==
Year	Award	Nominee/work	Result
2012	MTV Battle of The Boyband	Westlife	Won

== MTV Asia Awards ==
The MTV Asia Awards is an award show established in 2002, the show gives recognition and awards to Asian and international artists in achievement, cinema, fashion, humanitarian, and music.

Year	Award	Nominee/work	Result
2002	Favourite Pop Act	Westlife	Won
2003	Favourite Pop Act	Westlife	Nominated
2006	Favourite Pop Act	Westlife	Nominated

== MTV Europe Music Awards ==
The MTV Europe Music Awards "(EMA)" were established in 1994 by MTV Networks Europe to celebrate the most popular music videos in Europe. Westlife won 1 award from 3 nominations.

Year	Award	Nominee/work	Result
1999	Best New Act	Westlife	Nominated
1999	Best UK & Ireland Act	Westlife	Nominated
2000	Best UK & Ireland Act	Westlife	Won

== MTV Immies Awards ==
Year	Award	Nominee/work	Result
2003	Best Male Pop Act – Solo / Duo / Group	Westlife	Won

== Online Music Awards ==
Year	Award	Nominee/work	Result
2001	People's Choice	Westlife	Won

== National Music Awards ==
Year	Award	Nominee/work	Result
2002	Best UK Band	Westlife	Won

== Nordic Music Awards ==
Year	Award	Nominee/work	Result
2004	Best International Band	Westlife	Won

== NRJ Music Awards ==
Year	Award	Nominee/work	Result
2002	Best International Group	Westlife	Won

== Pepsi Chart People's Choice ==
Year	Award	Nominee/work	Result
2001	Best Breakthrough Video	Uptown Girl	Won

== Radio Music Awards ==
The Radio Music Awards was an annual U.S. award show that honored the year's most successful songs on mainstream radio.

Year	Award	Nominee/work	Result
2001	Listener's Choice Best Group	Westlife	Won

== RAV Awards ==
Year	Award	Nominee/work	Result
2001	Best Column Inches	Westlife	Won
2001	You Pretend to Hate Them But Know All Their Songs	Westlife	Won

== RIA (Singapore) ==
Year	Award	Nominee/work	Result
2001	Best Top Ten Selling Album	Westlife	Won

== RTE Choice Music Prize ==
Year	Award	Nominee/work	Result
2019	Song of the Year	Hello My Love	Won

== Smash Hits ==
Smash Hits was a pop music magazine, aimed at teenagers and young adults and originally published in the United Kingdom by EMAP.

Year	Award	Nominee/work	Result
1998	Best New Tour Act	Westlife	Won
2000	Best Album	Coast to Coast	Won
2000	Best Single	My Love	Won
2000	Best Non – British Band	Westlife	Won
2000	Best Band On Planet Pop	Westlife	Won
2000	Best Boyband in the Universe	Westlife	Won
2001	Best Band On Planet Pop	Westlife	Won
2001	Best Album	World of Our Own	Won
2002	Best Pop Band	Westlife	Won
2002	Best International Act	Westlife	Won
2002	Hall of Fame	Westlife	Won
2002	Best Cover of the Year	Westlife	Won
2003	Best International Act	Westlife	Won
2004	Favourite Download	Flying Without Wings	Won
2005	Best International Band	Westlife	Nominated

== Swedish Hit Music Awards ==
Year	Award	Nominee/work	Result
2002	Best International Group	Westlife	Won

== Ticketmaster Ireland ==
Year	Award	Nominee/work	Result
2019	Best Live Act	Westlife	Won

== The Record of the Year ==
The Record of the Year was an award voted by the United Kingdom public.

Year	Award	Nominee/work	Result
1999	The Record of the Year	Flying Without Wings	Won
2000	The Record of the Year	My Love	Won
2003	The Record of the Year	Mandy	Won
2005	The Record of the Year	You Raise Me Up	Won

== TMF Awards ==
The TMF Awards are an annual television awards show broadcast live on TMF (The Music Factory).

Year	Award	Nominee/work	Result
1999	Best Breakthrough Artist/Newcomer	Westlife	Won
2000	Best International Band	Westlife	Won
2002	Best International Pop Act	Westlife	Won
2003	Best Pop Act	Westlife	Won

== Top of the Pops Awards ==
Year	Award	Nominee/work	Result
1999	Best Band of the Year	Westlife	Won
1999	Best Love Song	Swear It Again	Won
2001	Best Pop Act	Westlife	Won
2001	Top Pop Act	Westlife	Won

== TV Hits Music Awards ==
Year	Award	Nominee/work	Result
1999	Best New Act	Westlife	Won
2000	Best Band	Westlife	Won
2000	Best World Artist	Westlife	Won

=== Variety Club of Great Britain Awards ===
Year	Award	Nominee/work	Result
2007	Best Recording Artist	Westlife	Won

== VIVA Comet ==
Year	Award	Nominee/work	Result
2001	Zuschauer Comet	Westlife	Won

== Weibo Starlight Awards ==
Year	Award	Nominee/work	Result
2019	Most Influential Western Group	Westlife	Won

== World Music Awards ==
The World Music Awards is an international awards show founded in 1989 that annually honors recording artists based on worldwide sales figures provided by the International Federation of the Phonographic Industry (IFPI). Westlife earned one award.

Year	Award	Nominee/work	Result
2004	World's Best-selling Artist/Ireland	Westlife	Won
2012	World's Best Group	Westlife	Nominated
2014	World's Best Group	Westlife	Nominated
2014	World's Best Live Act	Westlife	Nominated

== Other honours ==
=== Guinness World Records ===
The Guinness World Records honors the year's most impressive acts.

Year	Category	Recipient	Result	Ref.
2000	First to have its first seven debut singles to reach the number one in UK Singles Chart	Westlife	Won	
2002	Most public appearances by a pop band in 36 hours: The greatest number of public appearances by a pop band in 36 hours in different cities is five by Westlife from 10 to 11 November 2002.	Westlife	Won	
2003	Most singles to debut at number one on the UK Chart.	Westlife	Won	
2010	Top selling album music band in the 2000s decade in the United Kingdom	Westlife	Won	

=== Wembley Square of Fame ===
Year	Category	Recipient	Result	Ref.
2008	Wembley Square of Fame Star	Westlife (Kian, Mark, Nicky, and Shane)	Won	

== See also ==
- Westlife videography
- Westlife discography
- Westlife songlist
- Westlife tours
- List of best-selling boy bands
- UK Singles Chart records and statistics
- List of artists who reached number one on the UK Singles Chart
- List of best-selling music artists in the United Kingdom in singles sales
- List of artists by number of UK Singles Chart number ones
- List of UK Singles Downloads Chart number ones of the 2000s
- List of UK Singles Chart number ones of the 2000s
- List of UK Albums Chart number ones of the 2000s
- List of artists who reached number one in Ireland
- List of songs that reached number one on the Irish Singles Chart
- List of best-selling albums in the Philippines
