= 2005 Meteor Awards =

Irish music awards ceremony

- Date: 24 February 2005
- Location: Point Theatre
- Country: Ireland
- Presented by: Ed Byrne

Highlights
- Most awards: Franz Ferdinand; Snow Patrol (2)
- Most nominations: Franz Ferdinand; The Killers; Declan O'Rourke (3)

Television/radio coverage
- Network: RTÉ Two

The 2005 Meteor Music Awards was hosted by comedian Ed Byrne at the Point Theatre on Thursday 24 February 2005. It was the fifth edition of Ireland's national music awards. A total of sixteen awards were presented at the ceremony, with the public eligible to vote in five categories. Snow Patrol won two awards (Best Irish Band and Best Irish Album for Final Straw), whilst Franz Ferdinand also picked up two awards (Best International Band and Best International Album for Franz Ferdinand). Paddy Casey and Juliet Turner were named Best Irish Male and Best Irish Female. The Chalets won Best New Band.

== Performances ==
There were performances on the night from Declan O'Rourke, Westlife, Snow Patrol, Aslan, The Thrills, Bell X1, Brian McFadden and Delta Goodrem, and The Devlins.

== Nominations ==
The nominations were announced on 11 January 2005.

=== Public voting categories ===
==== Best Irish Band ====
- Bell X1
- Blink
- Future Kings of Spain
- Snow Patrol
- The Frames
- The Thrills

==== Best Irish Male ====
- Paddy Casey
- David Kitt
- Brian McFadden
- Mundy
- Declan O'Rourke
- Damien Rice

==== Best Irish Female ====
- Sinéad O'Connor
- Juliet Turner
- Ann Scott
- Eleanor Shanley
- Cathy Davey
- Bronagh Gallagher

==== Best Irish Pop Act ====
- Westlife
- The Corrs
- Brian McFadden
- Carol Anthony
- Ronan Keating
- D-Side

==== Best Irish DJ ====
- Alison Curtis – Today FM
- Ray D'Arcy – Today FM
- Ian Dempsey – Today FM
- Tom Dunne – Today FM
- Dave Fanning – RTÉ 2fm
- Jenny Huston – RTÉ 2fm
- Ryan Tubridy – RTÉ 2fm

=== Non-public voting categories ===
==== Best Irish Album ====
- Burn the Maps – The Frames
- Deep Inside the Sound of Sadness – Blink
- Final Straw – Snow Patrol
- Let's Bottle Bohemia – The Thrills
- Raining Down Arrows – Mundy
- Since Kyabram – Declan O'Rourke

==== Best Folk/Traditional ====
- Kíla
- Mary McPartlan
- George Murphy
- Declan O'Rourke
- Planxty
- Pauline Scanlon

==== Best International Male ====
- Eminem
- George Michael
- Morrissey
- Usher
- Kanye West
- Robbie Williams

==== Best International Female ====
- Anastacia
- Natasha Bedingfield
- PJ Harvey
- Kylie Minogue
- Bic Runga
- Joss Stone

==== Best International Album ====
- Aha Shake Heartbreak – Kings of Leon
- American Idiot – Green Day
- Hopes and Fears – Keane
- Hot Fuss – The Killers
- Scissor Sisters – Scissor Sisters
- Franz Ferdinand – Franz Ferdinand

==== Best International Group ====
- Franz Ferdinand
- Keane
- The Killers
- OutKast
- R.E.M.
- Scissor Sisters

==== Best Live Performance Visiting Act ====
- Franz Ferdinand
- The Killers
- Madonna
- Metallica
- Pixies
- Red Hot Chili Peppers

=== Hope for 2005 ===
- Angel of Mons

=== Lifetime Achievement Award ===
- Aslan

=== Humanitarian Award ===
- Adi Roche – in recognition of her work with the children of Chernobyl

=== Industry Award ===
- John Hughes

== Multiple nominations ==
Despite receiving three nominations, Declan O'Rourke did not take home an award on the night. Franz Ferdinand and Snow Patrol were multiple award winners in two categories.

- 3 – Franz Ferdinand
- 3 – The Killers
- 3 – Declan O'Rourke
- 2 – Blink
- 2 – The Frames
- 2 – Keane
- 2 – Mundy
- 2 – Scissor Sisters
- 2 – Snow Patrol
- 2 – The Thrills
