= Other Voices (Irish TV series) =

Live music TV and festival series

- 2016 logo
- Directed by: Maurice Linnane
- Presented by: Glen Hansard; Jerry Fish; John Kelly; Jenny Huston; Aidan Gillen; Huw Stephens; Annie Mac; MayKay (Mary-Kate Geraghty)
- Country of origin: Republic of Ireland

Production
- Producers: Tina O'Reilly (Nee Moran); Aoife Woodlock (music)
- Production locations: Saint James's Church, Dingle, County Kerry
- Editor: Philip King
- Running time: 45 minutes
- Production company: South Wind Blows Productions

Original release
- Network: RTÉ2
- Release: 2001 – present

Other Voices is an international music television series, festival, and tourism event that celebrates local culture on a global scale.

Since 2001, for over two decades, Other Voices has brought musicians and artists from across the world to Dingle, West Kerry. What began as an intimate gathering in 2001 has grown into a three-day festival of music, song and storytelling across more than 20 venues. Today, it is an established fixture in the Irish and international music calendar and a 'must attend' event for performers and audiences alike. Over the years, Other Voices has also travelled from its home base in West Kerry to Austin, London, Belfast, Ballina, New York, Derry, Cardigan in Wales and Berlin, enriching the cultural life of every destination it visits.

Other Voices broadcasts on Irish public service broadcaster RTÉ and is available worldwide on the RTÉ player.

Past performers at Other Voices include: Hozier, Amy Winehouse, Ellie Goulding, Mumford & Sons, St. Vincent, The xx, The National, The Murder Capital, Little Simz, Sigrid, Willie Nelson, Conor Oberst, Florence + The Machine, Gregory Porter, Jessie Ware, Sinéad O’Connor, Laura Marling, Arlo Parks, Sam Fender, Christy Moore, Super Furry Animals, Jarvis Cocker, Laura Mvula, Snow Patrol, Villagers, Fontaines D.C., Lisa Hannigan, The Gloaming, Lankum, Gilla Band, Rufus Wainwright, Dermot Kennedy, and Girl in the Year Above.

The filming for the series takes place annually in St. James' Church, Dingle, which holds only 80 guests who experience performances in an intimate setting. Tickets are given away through competitions and cannot be purchased. Performances are also streamed into venues around Dingle town including Benners Hotel, Paul Geaney's Bar, Marina Inn, John Bennys Pub, Nellie Fred's, McCarthys Bar, Barr na Sráide, O'Sullivans, Courthouse Pub, Foxy John's, Neligan's Bar, and The Dingle Pub.

The show (previously called Other Voices: Songs from a Room) first aired in 2003. It is regarded as Ireland's leading live music series, focusing mainly on alternative music from both Irish and international artists. Each December, over three days, a season is filmed in Dingle, County Kerry, during the Other Voices Music Festival. Since 2001, the festival has also held satellite events across the world in New York, Berlin, Austin and Wales. In 2020, in response to the global pandemic, Other Voices launched its Courage live stream series featuring artists including Lisa Hannigan, Glen Hansard and James Vincent McMorrow. In December 2020, it staged its annual Dingle edition as a five-day digital festival called Bringing It All Back Home, which showcased acts including Hozier, Damien Dempsey and Pillow Queens. In the same month, Other Voices: Home at the Guinness Storehouse was held in Dublin City with performances from Villagers, The Murder Capital, Denise Chaila and The Mary Wallopers. Subsequent years have continued with hybrid and live events, re-establishing the festival’s prominence in Ireland and abroad.

== Format ==
Each episode features live musical performances from both Irish and international artists, as well as in-studio or on-scene interviews across Dingle town. Filming of the live performances is usually in the 200-year-old Church of St James. The programme has had a range of presenters since 2001, including Glen Hansard (season 1), Jerry Fish (season 2), John Kelly (seasons 3–7), Jenny Huston (season 6), Annie Mac (seasons 7–8, 14–present), Aidan Gillen (seasons 10–13) and Huw Stephens (seasons 13–present). In 2020 MayKay (Fight Like Apes) presented Bringing It All Back Home, while Loah presented Other Voices: Home at the Guinness Storehouse.

== History ==
Shilpa Ganatra, writing in the Irish Independent in 2008, said: "Explaining Other Voices to a foreigner would sound like a flu-induced dream. I was in a pub in this tiny fishing village in the west of Ireland, where Ryan Adams was being filmed playing in front of 80 people in a tiny church. He was in the pub afterwards, and so was Paul Noonan from Bell X1 and Sinéad O'Connor, and Fight Like Apes were telling us about the most sordid website in existence".

The series was originally titled Other Voices: Songs From a Room, later shortened. The sixth series was recorded in November and December 2007 and began broadcasting on 13 February 2008, featuring a second host (Jenny Huston) and outdoor acoustic performances in Dingle. The seventh series (2008) was presented by John Kelly and Annie Mac. It included artists such as Emilíana Torrini, Duke Special, Billy Bragg, Elbow and Lisa Hannigan.

The eighth series (2009) was presented by Annie Mac, with performers including Snow Patrol, Richard Hawley, The xx, The Temper Trap, Imelda May and Florence + The Machine. Snow Patrol’s performance marked the first ever use of optical burst switching for live music. The series was broadcast on RTÉ Two from 3 February until 10 March 2010.

Other Voices NYC, broadcast over Christmas 2011, was centred on the East Village, New York City, and featured Gabriel Byrne, Roddy Doyle, Damien Rice and Joseph O'Connor.

== Supporters ==
The series is supported by RTÉ Television, IMRO, and the Department of Arts, Heritage and the Gaeltacht. The 2016 season was supported by The Ireland Funds, Lonely Planet and the Wild Atlantic Way. The 2015 season was supported by The Guardian.

== Albums ==
The success of the television series led to several CD releases featuring live recordings. In more recent years, Other Voices live content has been made available to stream on Spotify and to purchase on Apple Music. With the move to digital platforms, the CD series has been discontinued.

=== Track listings ===
CD1

- Release: 22 May 2003 (Ireland)
- Label: Dara Records
1. American Townland – Interference
2. Snow Is Gone – Josh Ritter
3. Healthy – Mundy
4. Universal – Nina Hynes
5. Closer To Happy – Emmett Tinley
6. True Friends – Jerry Fish
7. Other Men – Martin Finke
8. Volunteer – Mark Geary
9. Belle – Paul Tiernan
10. Stars Above – Maria Doyle Kennedy
11. On A May Morning – Barry McCormack
12. Party On – Damien Dempsey
13. Star Star – The Frames
14. The Blower's Daughter – Damien Rice
15. Anyone Who's Yet To Come – Paddy Casey
16. What Would I Know – Roesy
17. Standing in Doorways – Ger Wolfe
18. An Taobh Tuathail Amach – Rónán Ó Snodaigh
19. Limerick – John Hegarty

CD2

- Label: Dara Records
1. Staring at the Sun – Simple Kid
2. Evening Sun – Gemma Hayes
3. Self Servin' Society – Paddy Casey
4. Heyday – Glen Hansard
5. Captain Cassanova – Rodrigo Y Gabriella
6. One Man Guy – Turn
7. Erin The Green – Cara Dillon
8. Daybreak – Bell X1
9. Metropolitan Avenue – Christy Moore
10. Quiet of the Night – Karan Casey
11. Saturdays – David Kitt
12. The Be All and End All – Bic Runga
13. Forgotten Lake – The Handsome Family
14. You – Luka Bloom
15. Out of the Blue – The Tyco Brahe
16. Your World – Declan O'Rourke
17. My Brass Buttons – The Jimmy Cake
18. Churchyard – Pauline Scanlon
19. Upside Down – Jerry Fish & The Mudbug Club

CD3

- Release: 3 June 2005 (Ireland)
- Label: Dara Records
1. A Drop of Rain – Joe Chester
2. Hold Up – Republic of Loose
3. Sunnyroad – Emiliana Torrini
4. It's Been Done – Angela McCloskey
5. GoGo (Don't Go) – The Chalets
6. Galileo – Declan O'Rourke
7. Saints and Sinners – Paddy Casey
8. Sunshine Superman – Donovan
9. Kite Flyers Hill – Eddi Reader
10. Day in Verona – Tom Baxter
11. Our Mutual Friend – The Divine Comedy
12. Misguided Angel – Cowboy Junkies
13. Ellis Unit One – Steve Earle
14. Back to Me – Kathleen Edwards
15. Angel – Gavin Friday
16. Liberty Bell – Autamata
17. Hungry – Sonny Condell
18. Wedding Dress – Mark Lanegan Band

== Logos ==
Other Voices (2003–2015)
