= Mesner =

- Origin: Portlaoise, Ireland
- Genres: Indie rock, Alternative rock
- Years active: 1995–2010
- Labels: Independent
- Members: Brendan McEvoy (AKA Macaboy); Mark Alfred; Ger Ryan; Siv; Balage Antal

Mesner were an Irish indie band that grew to prominence in the 1990s, reaching the top of the Irish indie charts. The band's success elsewhere was muted till the mid-2000s when a new following emerged in the Los Angeles suburbs. The band consisted of Brendan McEvoy (Songwriter/Lead Vocals/Guitar), Mark Alfred (Drums/Backing Vocals), Ger Ryan (Bass/Keyboards) and Siv (Lead Guitar).

== Mid 90s ==
The band formed in Portlaoise in Ireland, and gained a reputation for "electric live performances". In 1996 they released a single, "St Jesus, Uncle God" which topped the Irish Indie charts. They had previously released the singles "Flowers" which was well received on Dave Fannings television show.

They followed up on their chart topping success by releasing the single "Black 'n' orange" (1997), a song that was originally a b-side to "St Jesus Uncle God". In 2000 they released a single called "Saturday".

== Mid 2000s ==
In 2006, the band relocated to Los Angeles where they had gigs on the sunset Strip, playing in venues such as The Viper Room, The Roxy, The Cat Club and Whisky a Go Go. They recorded an album called "Illegally Mellow" with producer Mark Paladino, who had previously worked with Fleetwood Mac, Billy Idol and Bernie Taupin amongst others. The album also featured a recording of Black n Orange and Illegally Mellow, both of which were b-sides to their 1996 single, "St Jesus Uncle God". The band released the single 'Where is Your Head At?' on 24 August 2007.

The band returned to Ireland in 2009.

== Solo work ==
Mark Alfred now tours with Riverdance.
