= Jenny Houston =

Jenny Houston may refer to:

- Jenny Houston (Hollyoaks), a character in Hollyoaks
- Jenny Huston (born 1973), radio and television presenter
