= Other Creatures =

Irish musical group

- Origin: Dublin, Ireland
- Genres: Alternative Rock Indie Rock Indie Pop

Other Creatures are an alternative rock band from Dublin, Ireland. They were featured on the RTÉ series Other Voices as an act in the music festival of the same name in Dingle, County Kerry and have performed in various venues around Dublin and the UK. They released their debut, The First EP, in 2017 and a follow-up EP, Coko, in 2019.
