= List of best-selling singles and albums of 2004 in Ireland =

This is a list of the top selling singles and top selling albums in Ireland in 2004.

== Top selling singles ==
1. "Do They Know It's Christmas?" – Band Aid 20
2. "F**k It (I Don't Want You Back)" – Eamon
3. "The Langer" – Tim O'Riordan and Natural Gas
4. "Milkshake" – Kelis
5. "Left Outside Alone" – Anastacia
6. "Everytime" – Britney Spears
7. "Toxic" – Britney Spears
8. "Yeah!" – Usher feat Lil' Jon and Ludacris
9. "Dragostea Din Tei" – O-Zone
10. "Call On Me" – Eric Prydz

== Top sellings albums ==
1. How to Dismantle an Atomic Bomb – U2
2. Living – Paddy Casey
3. Greatest Hits – Guns N' Roses
4. Songs about Jane – Maroon 5
5. Final Straw – Snow Patrol
6. O – Damien Rice
7. Greatest Hits – Robbie Williams
8. Greatest Hits: My Prerogative – Britney Spears
9. Confessions – Usher
10. A Grand Don't Come for Free – The Streets

Notes:

- *Compilation albums that are composed of Various Artists are not included.

== See also ==
- List of songs that reached number one on the Irish Singles Chart
- List of artists who reached number one in Ireland

== Resources ==
- IRMA Official Site
