= The Dave Fanning Show =

Irish radio programme

The Dave Fanning Show is a radio program broadcast on RTÉ Radio. The show is presented by Dave Fanning and has, at various times, been broadcast on both RTÉ Radio 1 and RTÉ 2fm.

== History ==
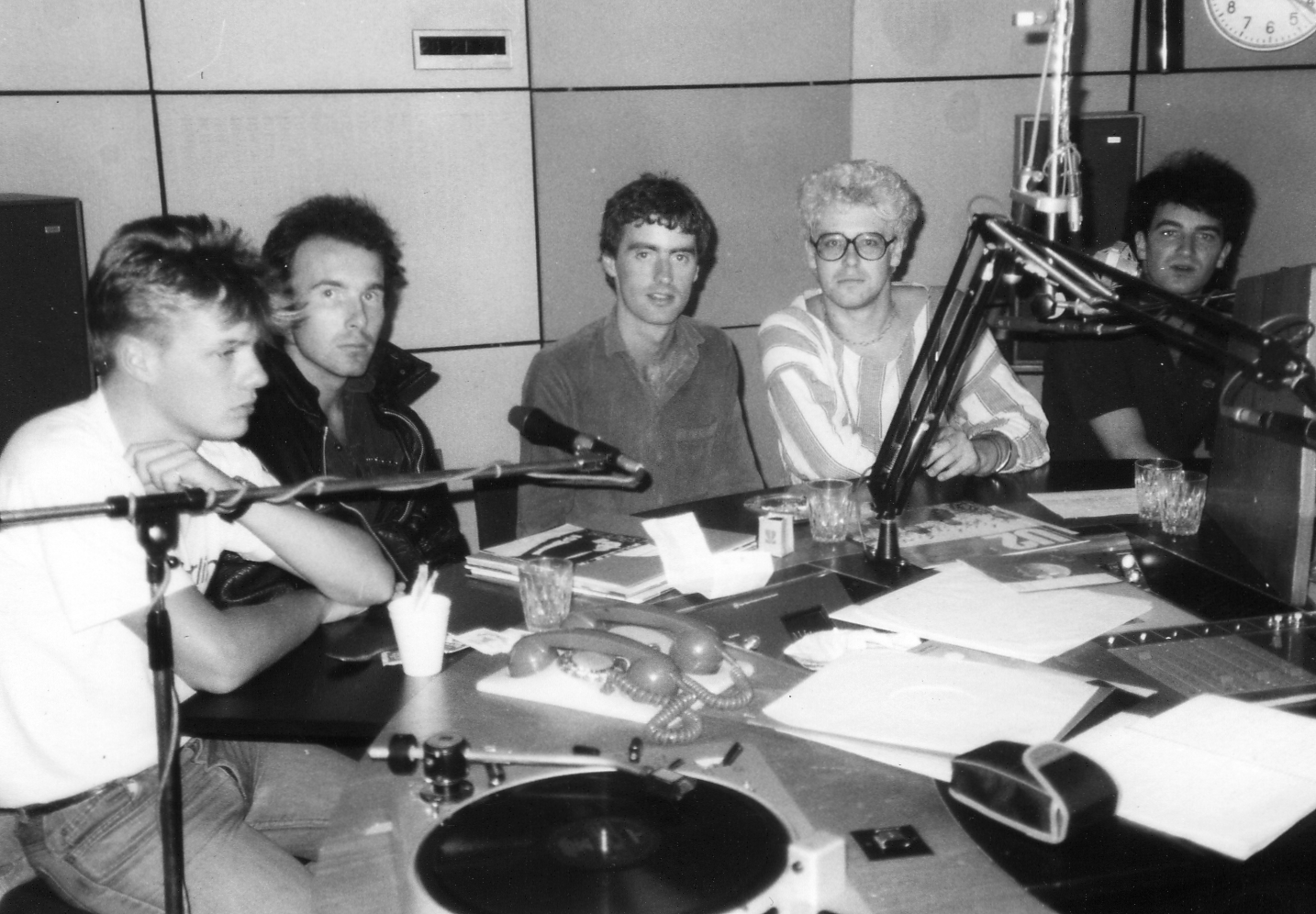
U2 in studio with Dave Fanning in 1982

The first Dave Fanning Show was broadcast on RTÉ Radio 2 from the 1970s. This music-based show featured the Fanning Sessions, where aspiring bands were afforded a full recording session which was subsequently played on Fanning's radio show. U2 recorded one such Fanning Session, in return for which Fanning was given the world-exclusive first play of all new U2 singles. Other bands to record Fanning Sessions have included The Cranberries, JJ72, Kerbdog and Therapy?.

With updating schedules, the Dave Fanning Show was broadcast at different time-slots throughout the 1980s and 1990s on RTÉ Radio 2 (which was rebranded "2FM" in 1988). Focusing on music until the early 1990s, the format was updated to include a mix of music, movie news, lifestyle items, competitions, and guests. The last such incarnation of this weekday "Dave Fanning Show" was broadcast on RTÉ 2fm from March 2002 until July 2006.

In 2006, the Dave Fanning Show was moved to RTÉ Radio 1. By 2009, however, it was returned to RTÉ 2FM as an evening weekday show.

As of 2020, the Dave Fanning Show is broadcast as a weekend midday magazine/chat show on RTÉ 2FM.

On 22 February 2023, Fanning announced that he was stepping away from his weekend show on RTÉ 2FM but that he would continue broadcasting on digital radio, on TV and online.

== Signature tunes ==
- Until mid 1990s - Oh Well by Fleetwood Mac
- In the later 1990s - Another Girl Another Planet by The Only Ones
- Up to July 2006 - The Modern Age by The Strokes
