= Eimear O'Grady =

Irish stunt performer

Eimear O'Grady is an Irish stuntwoman.

== Early life and education ==
O'Grady is from County Wicklow. As a child, she was a competitive swimmer and diver. She earned a BA in cello music performance from the Royal Irish Academy of Music. She subsequently took the two-year Professional Actor course at the Gaiety School of Acting.

== Career ==
After graduation, O'Grady worked as a professional cellist. She performed with musicians such as Ray Manzarek and toured with the band One Day International. O'Grady began working in stunts in 2008. She has worked as a stunt performer and stunt coordinator on a variety of films and television shows including Wednesday, Bad Sisters, Banshees of Iniserin, Vikings, The Tudors, Murder Mystery, and Foundation. O'Grady credits working as Eva Green's stunt double on Penny Dreadful as her breakthrough job.

== Personal life ==
O'Grady married to Declan O'Rourke in 2015. They have one son.
