= Meteor Music Awards =

Defunct Irish music award

Meteor Award
- Awarded for: Achievements in the Irish and international record industry
- Sponsored by: Meteor Mobile
- Venue: Point Theatre, Dublin (2001–2007); RDS Simmonscourt, Dublin (2008–2010)
- Country: Ireland
- First award: 18 March 2001
- Final award: 21 February 2010

Highlights
- Most awards: U2
- Website: www.themeteors.ie

Television/radio coverage
- Network: RTÉ Two

A Meteor Ireland Music Award was an accolade bestowed upon professionals in the music industry in Ireland and further afield. They had been bestowed each year since 2001, replacing the IRMA Ireland Music Awards held in the 1990s. Promoted by MCD Productions, the ceremony at which these accolades were bestowed upon worthy recipients was referred to colloquially as The Meteors, though occasionally also by its full title.

Event organisers confirmed in January 2011 that there would be no awards ceremony that year, with Meteor's cancellation of its sponsorship of the event widely blamed for this abrupt occurrence.

== History ==
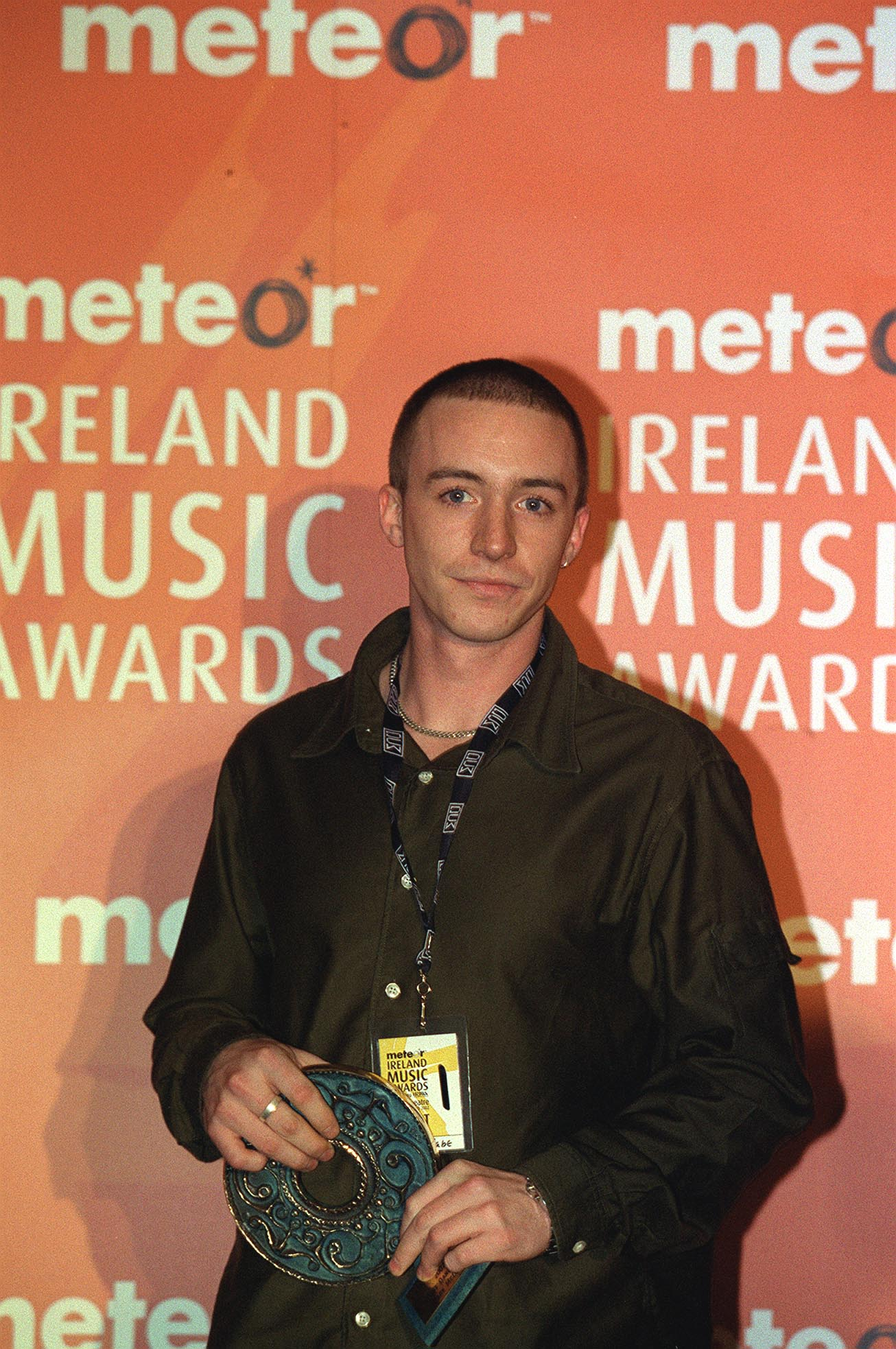
Example of a Meteor Award

The Meteor Ireland Music Awards were the equivalent to the Canadian Juno Awards, the American Grammy Awards, the Echo Awards in Germany, and the United Kingdom's BRIT Awards. The awards take their name from their sponsors, Meteor.

Each year there was a mix of live performances and award presentations at a ceremony conducted in the Point Theatre, Dublin (2001–2007) and the Royal Dublin Society's Simmonscourt, Dublin (2008–2010). Irish artists to have showcased their music included Snow Patrol, Sinéad O'Connor, Declan O'Rourke, U2, Bell X1, Aslan, Westlife, the Blizzards, the Frames, the Coronas, Director, Hothouse Flowers, Cathy Davey, the Devlins, the Thrills, Paddy Casey, and the Immediate, whilst previous live performances by international artists have included the Pussycat Dolls, Amy Winehouse, Sugababes, Counting Crows, the Darkness, Kaiser Chiefs, Lionel Richie, and Tom Jones.

Presenters included both Irish and international figures from music, sport, film, television, and beauty: Joe Elliott, Denis Hickie, Colin Farrell, Alex Zane, and Rosanna Davison. The award ceremony was hosted by a number of different personalities throughout its history: Ed Byrne, Patrick Kielty, Amanda Byram, Podge and Rodge alongside Deirdre O'Kane, and Dara Ó Briain.

Originally held in the Point Theatre in Dublin, in 2008 the award ceremony moved to the RDS Simmonscourt of the Royal Dublin Society until its cancellation in 2011.

== Recipients by year ==
A list of winners is to be found on the Meteor website.

=== Irish awards ===
Year	Male	Female	Band	Album	Live Performance	Pop Act	New Act	Lifetime Achievement	Industry
2001	Ronan Keating	Sharon Shannon	U2	All That You Can't Leave Behind	U2	Westlife	JJ72	Christy Moore	Louis Walsh
2002	David Kitt	Samantha Mumba	U2	All That You Can't Leave Behind	—N/a	Westlife	The Revs	Paul McGuinness	—N/a
2003	Mundy	Carly Hennessy	U2	Skylarkin'	—N/a	Westlife	The Thrills	Bob Geldof	Phil Coulter
2004	Paddy Casey	Cara Dillon	The Frames	So Much for the City	—N/a	Westlife	Future Kings of Spain	The Dubliners	Dave Fanning
2005	Paddy Casey	Juliet Turner	Snow Patrol	Final Straw	—N/a	Westlife	The Chalets	Aslan	John Hughes
2006	Damien Dempsey	Gemma Hayes	U2	How to Dismantle an Atomic Bomb	U2	Westlife	Humanzi	The Pogues	Bill Whelan
2007	Damien Dempsey	Luan Parle	Snow Patrol	Eyes Open	Snow Patrol	Westlife	Director	Clannad	Larry Gogan
2008	Duke Special	Cathy Davey	Aslan	Addicted to Company	The Blizzards	Westlife	—N/a	The Saw Doctors	Jim Aiken
2009	Mick Flannery	Imelda May	The Script	The Script	The Blizzards	Westlife	—N/a	Sharon Shannon	Niall Stokes
2010	Christy Moore	Wallis Bird	Snow Patrol	Tony Was An Ex-Con	The Script	Westlife	Amasis	Brian Kennedy	Henry Mountcharles

=== International awards ===
Year	Male	Female	Band	Album	Live Performance
2001	David Gray	Whitney Houston	—N/a	White Ladder	—N/a
2002	Robbie Williams	Dido	Stereophonics	Is This It	Red Hot Chili Peppers
2003	Eminem	Avril Lavigne	Coldplay	By the Way	Red Hot Chili Peppers
2004	Justin Timberlake	Beyoncé	The Darkness	Elephant	Red Hot Chili Peppers
2005	Morrissey	PJ Harvey	Franz Ferdinand	Franz Ferdinand	The Killers
2006	Kanye West	Gwen Stefani	Kaiser Chiefs	Employment	—N/a
2007	Justin Timberlake	Lily Allen	Scissor Sisters	Whatever People Say I Am, That's What I'm Not	—N/a
2008	Bruce Springsteen	Amy Winehouse	Arcade Fire	Neon Bible	Muse
2009	James Morrison	Duffy	Elbow	Only by the Night	Leonard Cohen
2010	Michael Bublé	Lady Gaga	Florence and the Machine	Sunny Side Up	Leonard Cohen

== Award ceremonies by year ==
Ceremony	Date	Venue	Broadcast date	Host
2001	18 March	Point Theatre, Dublin	20 March	Ed Byrne
2002	4 March	Point Theatre, Dublin	6 March	Patrick Kielty
2003	3 March	Point Theatre, Dublin	5 March	Dara Ó Briain
2004	1 March	Point Theatre, Dublin	3 March, 21:00	Dara Ó Briain
2005	24 February	Point Theatre, Dublin	27 February	Ed Byrne
2006	2 February	Point Theatre, Dublin	5 February, 21:00	Patrick Kielty
2007	1 February	Point Theatre, Dublin	4 February, 21:00	Deirdre O'Kane and Podge and Rodge
2008	15 February	RDS Simmonscourt, Dublin	16 February, 21:00	Dara Ó Briain
2009	17 March	RDS Simmonscourt, Dublin	18 March, 21:00	Amanda Byram
2010	19 February	RDS Simmonscourt, Dublin	21 February, 21.00	Amanda Byram
