= 2001 Meteor Awards =

Irish music awards ceremony

- Date: 18 March 2001
- Location: Point Theatre
- Hosted by: Ed Byrne

Television/radio coverage
- Network: Network 2

The 2001 Meteor Music Awards was the first edition of Ireland's national music awards. A total of twenty-five awards were presented at the ceremony.

== Winners ==
The list of winners list is located here.

- Best Selling Irish Pop/Rock Album – Male Artist: Ronan – Ronan Keating
- Best Selling Dance Act: Morcheeba
- Best Selling Irish Album – Female Artist: The Diamond Mountain Sessions – Sharon Shannon
- Best Irish Newcomer: JJ72
- Best Selling International Album – Male Artist: White Ladder – David Gray
- Best Selling Irish Rock Group – Album: All That You Can't Leave Behind – U2
- Music Industry Award: Louis Walsh
- Hope for 2001: Relish
- Best Selling Pop Group – Album: Coast to Coast – Westlife
- Best Selling Irish Single – Male Artist: "Maniac 2000" – Mark McCabe
- Best Rock DJ: Dave Fanning – RTÉ 2fm
- Lifetime Achievement Award: Christy Moore
- Best Selling Irish Single – Female Artist: "Gotta Tell You" – Samantha Mumba
- Best Selling Irish Video: D'Mother – D'Unbelievables
- Best International Songwriter: David Gray
- Hot Press Album of the Year: Red Dirt Girl – Emmylou Harris
- Best Irish Song/Band: U2
- Humanitarian Award: Elton John Foundation
- Best Irish Songwriter: Bono/The Edge
- Best International Female – Album: The Greatest Hits – Whitney Houston
- Best Selling International Group – Album: 1 – The Beatles
- Best Selling International Single – Male Artist: "Stan" – Eminem
- Best Selling International Single – Female Artist: "Can't Fight the Moonlight" – LeAnn Rimes
- Best Selling International Single – Group: "The Bad Touch" – Bloodhound Gang
- Best Selling Irish Album – Male Artist: Faith & Inspiration – Daniel O'Donnell
