= Mag Pai Zai =

Studio album by Declan O'Rourke
- Released: 8 April 2011
- Genre: Folk
- Length: 48:16
- Label: Rimecoat

Declan O'Rourke chronology
Big Bad Beautiful World (2007)	Mag Pai Zai (2011)	Howlin' Lowly Moons (2014)

Professional ratings
Review scores
Source	Rating
AllMusic	3.5/5 stars

Mag Pai Zai is the third album from singer-songwriter Declan O'Rourke, released in 2011.

== Track listing ==
1. "Slíeve Bloom"
2. "Time Machine"
3. "A Little Something"
4. "Be Brave and Believe"
5. "Lightning Bird Wind River Man"
6. "Langley's Requiem"
7. "Dancing Song"
8. "Caterpillar DNA"
9. "Orphan Wind Song"
10. "The Hardest Fight"
11. "The Old Black Crow"

== Charts ==
Chart performance for Mag Pai Zai
Chart (2011)	Peak position
Irish Albums (IRMA)	6
