= Amen (So Be It) =

Studio album by Paddy Casey
- Released: 28 June 1999
- Recorded: Ireland
- Genre: Folk
- Length: 43:12
- Label: Sony Music UK

Paddy Casey chronology
Amen (So Be It) (1999)	Living (2003)

Professional ratings
Review scores
Source	Rating
AllMusic	4/5 stars

Amen (So Be It) is the debut album by Irish musician Paddy Casey. It was released on 28 June 1999.

== Track listing ==
1. “Fear”
2. “Whatever Gets You True”
3. “Can’t Take That Away”
4. “Ancient Sorrow”
5. “Everybody Wants”
6. “Sweet Suburban Sky”
7. “Downtown”
8. “Would U B”
9. “Winter’s Fire”
10. “Rainwater”
11. “It’s Over Now”

== Charts ==
Chart (2000)	Peak position
Australian Albums (ARIA Charts)	77
