= Tom Dunne =

Irish broadcaster and singer-songwriter

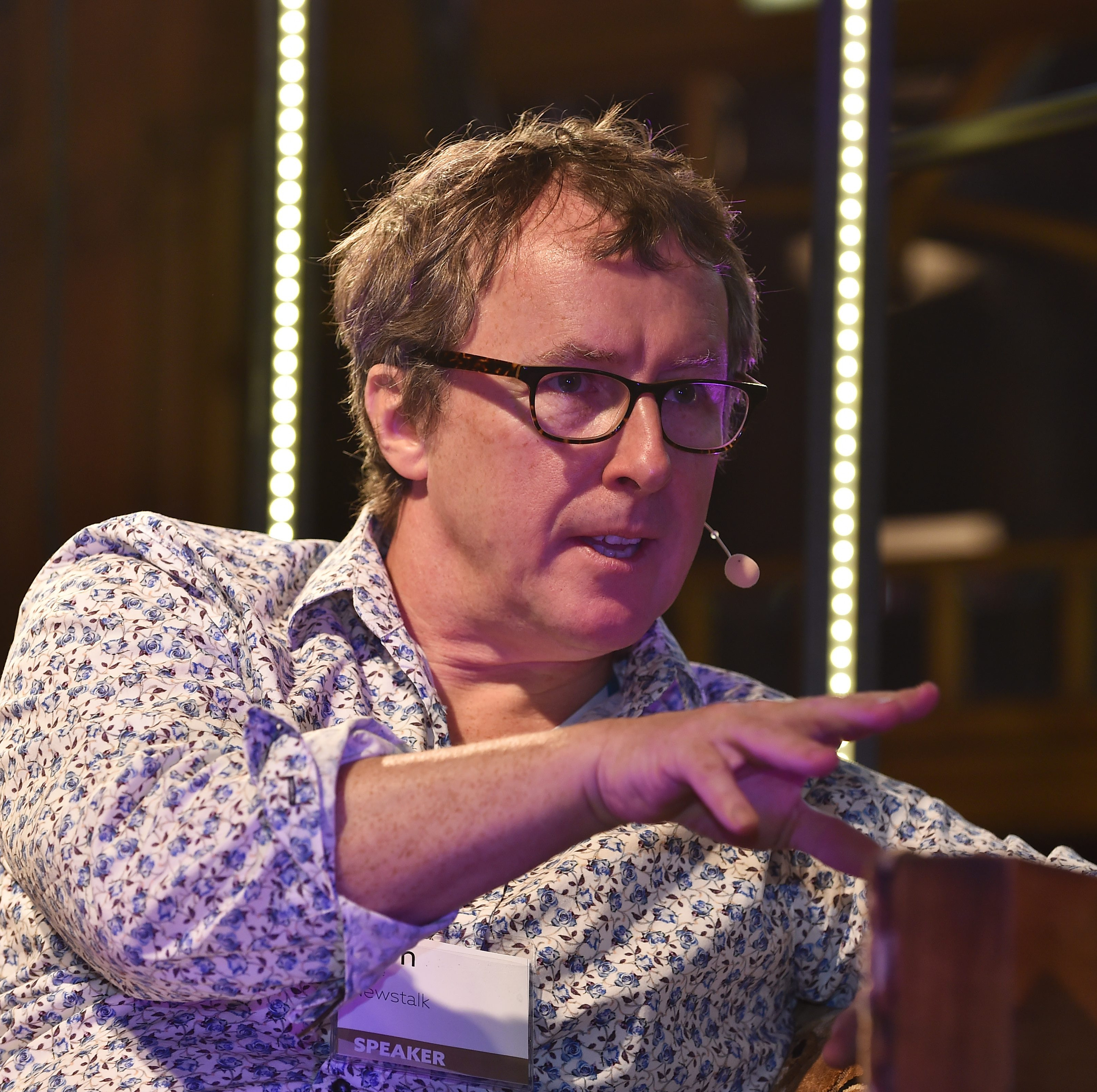
- Dunne in 2014
- Born: Thomas Dunne; Dublin, Ireland
- Education: Engineering degree
- Alma mater: University College Dublin
- Occupation: Broadcaster
- Employer(s): Newstalk (August 2008- present, currently); Today FM (1999- August 2008, formerly); 98FM (formerly)
- Known for: Presenting "Pet Sounds" on Today FM, his morning radio show and later late-night show on Newstalk, lead singer/songwriter for Something Happens
- Partner: Audrey Dunne
- Children: 2 Daughters; Eva & Skye

Thomas Dunne is an Irish radio broadcaster with Newstalk, and a singer/songwriter with the band Something Happens.

Prior to joining Newstalk, Dunne worked on Today FM, presenting his "Pet Sounds" radio program, which began airing in 1999.

Dunne left Today FM to join Newstalk in August 2008. Dunne's former slot on Today FM was taken over by various guest presenters and later by Paul McLoone, who had previously worked as a producer on "Pet Sounds", from September 2008.

== Early life ==
Dunne graduated from University College, Dublin, with a degree in engineering, before becoming lead singer and songwriter for the band Something Happens from the 1980s until the mid-1990s.

== Radio career ==
Dunne became involved in radio, initially presenting a nighttime contemporary Irish music show called Totally Irish on 98FM, taking over from Jim O'Neill. He moved to early evenings on 98FM before moving to the new national radio station, Today FM in 1999, where he presented his show, Pet Sounds from 7.00pm to 10.00pm every Monday to Thursday, with assistance from Ann Gleeson. The show itself quickly became well-regarded among music fans in Ireland for playing a mix of alternative, indie rock and new music, frequently airing songs before they received mainstream radio airplay.

Dunne also filled in on The Ian Dempsey Breakfast Show and The Ray D'Arcy Show, whenever Ian Dempsey and Ray D'Arcy were on holidays. Former A-House frontman Dave Couse filled in for Dunne when he covered for another DJ during the daytime or if Dunne was on off holidays.

In 2006, Dunne contacted Paul McLoone, the current frontman/lead vocalist with the Northern Irish punk group, The Undertones and offered McLoone a position as producer on his show. McLoone, who had previously worked as a producer on the Ian Dempsey Breakfast Show for five years until 2004, accepted the offer and returned to Today FM.

Two years later, during August 2008, it was announced that Dunne was leaving Today FM to join stablemate station, Newstalk, which also saw Dunne's "Pet Sounds" radio show come to an end as well after nine years of being on the air.

Following Dunne's departure from Today FM, various guest presenters took over the role on a temporary basis which enabled the guests themselves to play a selection of their own songs. McLoone approached Today FM management himself, asking to be given the opportunity to take over the position temporarily until another replacement could be found. Management agreed, and McLoone stepped down from his role as a producer and became an official radio presenter. Although McLoone's tenure as Dunne's replacement was originally intended to last for three months, McLoone became the permanent replacement for Dunne due to the increasing popularity of his own radio show, later named "The Paul McLoone Show" and becoming the permanent replacement for "Pet Sounds". A month after Dunne's official departure from Today FM, McLoone made his own on-air debut as a radio presenter, during September 2008, with the show itself first airing at 7pm-10pm, then 7pm-midnight before receiving its final time slot of 10pm to midnight, until it was cancelled in 2021.

Dunne moved to Newstalk in September 2008. Newstalk and Today FM are part of the Communicorp Group, owned by Denis O'Brien and at first, presented his show titled "The Tom Dunne Show" on weekday mornings from 10am to midday before being moved to the nighttime slot due to Pat Kenny's arrival. Dunne has appeared on various talk-based shows on Newstalk as an expert contributor for music-based discussions including, for example, following the death of a notable musician.

On Sunday nights, Dunne presents an alternative-leaning music show on Newstalk called "Surf's Up".

Newstalk was obliged to issue an on-air apology to Mary Harney after Nell McCafferty's comments on The Tom Dunne Show in 2010. Nell McCafferty was unapologetic about her remarks.

== Television career ==
Dunne's first foray into TV presenting was on a short-lived youth-orientated music programme on RTÉ called Popscene. Dunne later took over the reins of Planet Rock Profiles from Dave Fanning, a programme that has aired on RTÉ, ITV, VH1, and many other TV stations around the world. He presented (along with Jenny Huston) RTÉ's coverage of the Electric Picnic music festival in 2006. Dunne also presents a mobile TV show called The Hive on the 3 Ireland mobile network. Tom is the unseen narrator of RTÉ's The Zoo.

== Other media work ==
Dunne occasionally contributes the voice of Bill Cullen to Today FM's Gift Grub. He writes a weekly column in the HQ Magazine City Entertainment supplement of the Evening Herald. He has also published three collections of his favourite songs by Irish artists, or artists associated with Ireland, known as the Tom Dunne Collections. In early 2006, he released The Definitive Tom Dunne Vol. 01: Pet Picks 2000-2006, a compilation of some of the most popular tracks from the Pet Sounds radio show.

== Awards ==
In 2002, Dunne scooped the double of the Best DJ title at the Meteor Music Awards and the same prize from Hot Press magazine. He has five PPI Awards.

Year	Nominee / work	Award	Result
2002	Tom Dunne	Best DJ at the Meteor Awards	Won
2002	Tom Dunne	Best DJ from Hot Press	Won
