= Big Bad Beautiful World =

Studio album by Declan O'Rourke
- Released: 14 September 2007
- Genre: Acoustic, folk rock
- Length: 47:43
- Label: N4

Declan O'Rourke chronology
Since Kyabram (2004)	Big Bad Beautiful World (2007)	Mag Pai Zai (2011)

Professional ratings
Review scores
Source	Rating
AllMusic	3/5 stars

Big Bad Beautiful World is the second full-length album by Declan O'Rourke.

== Track listing ==
1. "Big Bad Beautiful World"
2. "Save Your Soul"
3. "Make Something"
4. "Whatever Else Happens"
5. "Man of Peace"
6. "Just to Be Friends"
7. "One Day in a War"
8. "Being Your Friend"
9. "A Song On Love and Hate"
10. "Stay in Sight"
11. "Silly Days"
12. "Twinkle Twinkle"

== Charts ==
Chart performance for Big Bad Beautiful World
Chart (2007)	Peak position
Irish Albums (IRMA)	4
