= 2TV (TV programme) =

- Genre: Music
- Directed by: Finín O Ceallacháin
- Starring: Dave Fanning, Bianca Luykx
- Country of origin: Ireland
- Original language: English

Production
- Executive producer: Isobel Charlton
- Editor: Ed Darragh / Finín O Ceallacháin

Original release
- Network: Network 2
- Release: 1995 – 2001

2TV was an Irish music programme broadcast on Sunday mornings on both Network 2 television and RTÉ 2fm radio from 1995 until at least 2001, even during the summer months. It was presented by Dave Fanning, with Bianca Luykx, although Ray D'Arcy (who was known at the time for working weekdays on the children's television programme The Den) was once said to have done a summer show to allow Fanning to spend more time with his family, being referred to as "Dave" "about a dozen times". The programme was essentially a continuation of Ian Dempsey's The Beatbox, which (also as a TV and radio "simulcast") had occupied 2TV's Sunday morning time-slot for the previous number of years. In 2000, Fanning admitted that he did no work on the show and that he did not like most of the music he played on it. This was not however the reason for its cancellation as he also said he would continue presenting it. Fanning described it as "not rocket science, it's moron television", saying he "hardly even knew where the 2TV office was, and that's God's honest truth". Promotions for the show were created by a Swede, Jorgen Andreason, who had ten years experience at Swedish Television before moving to Ireland.

2TV drew much criticism for its limited choice of musical style. A typical video featured would be "Dreams" by The Corrs, whilst programme editor Ed Darragh, a writer, producer and performer on numerous radio commercials and researcher and interviewer on several radio programmes, including The Gerry Ryan Show and Moloney After Midnight, was misquoted in a Hot Press interview saying that: "The Saw Doctors are shite. She expressed that they are superb 2TV material. We also have lot of time for bands like Aslan." Other bands whose videos would be featured or that would be discussed or interviewed on the programme included The Fugees, A Tribe Called Quest, B*Witched, Trisha Yearwood, Kerri Ann, Stereophonics, Boyzone, Brandy and Monica, Matchbox 20 and Neil Finn. From October 1998, the programme was Edited, and Directed by Finín O Ceallacháin, until it was taken off air in 2000. A major reason for the show's cancellation was the rise of 24-hour music-video channels, which also led to the end of The Top 30 Hits, The Chart Show and even Top of the Pops.
