= Gaiety School of Acting =

Drama school in Dublin, Ireland

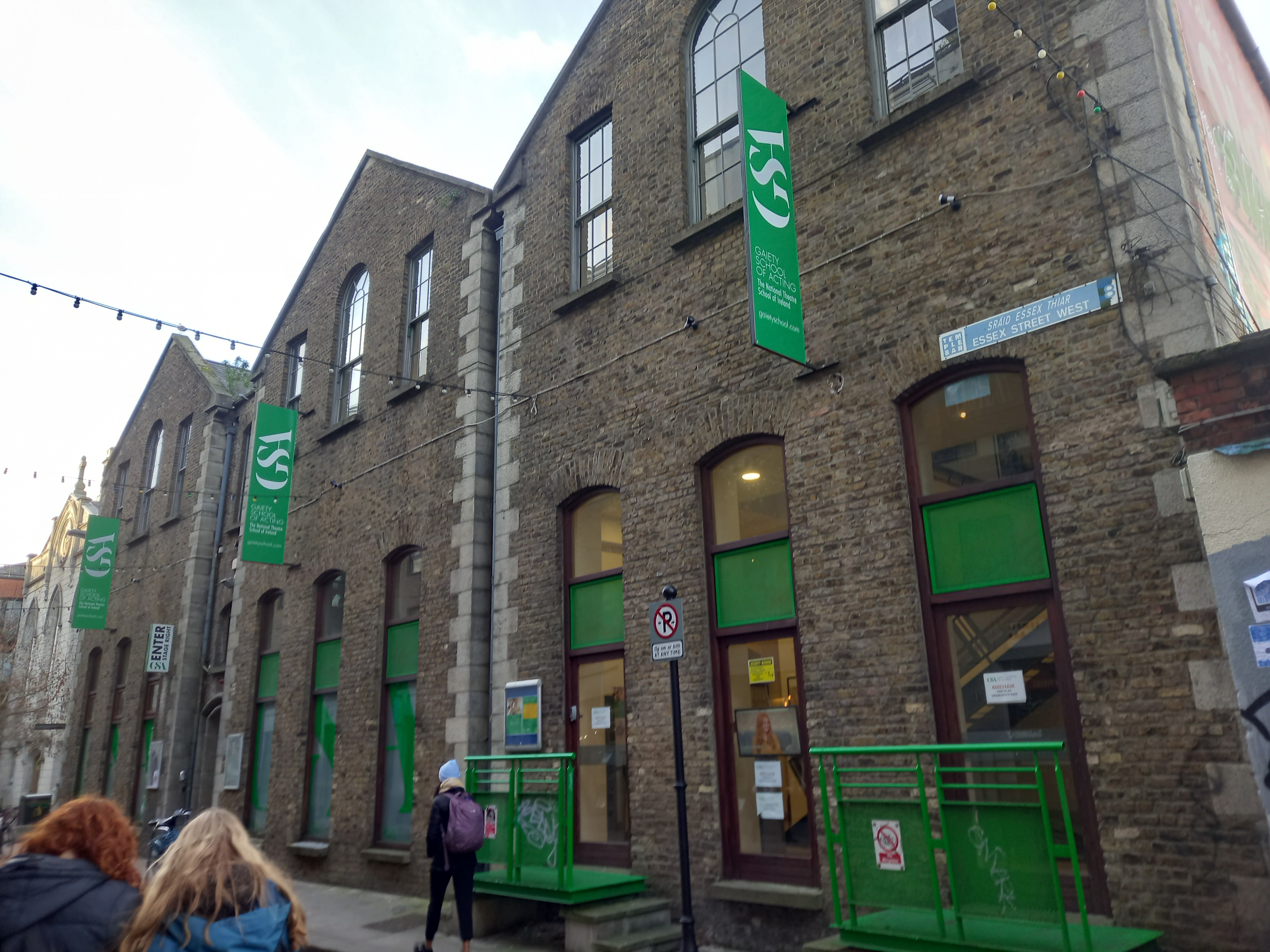
- Gaiety School of Acting in Temple Bar, Dublin
- Type: Private
- Established: 1986
- Location: Essex Street West, Temple Bar, Dublin, Ireland; 53.345014°N 6.265579°W
- Website: gaietyschool.com

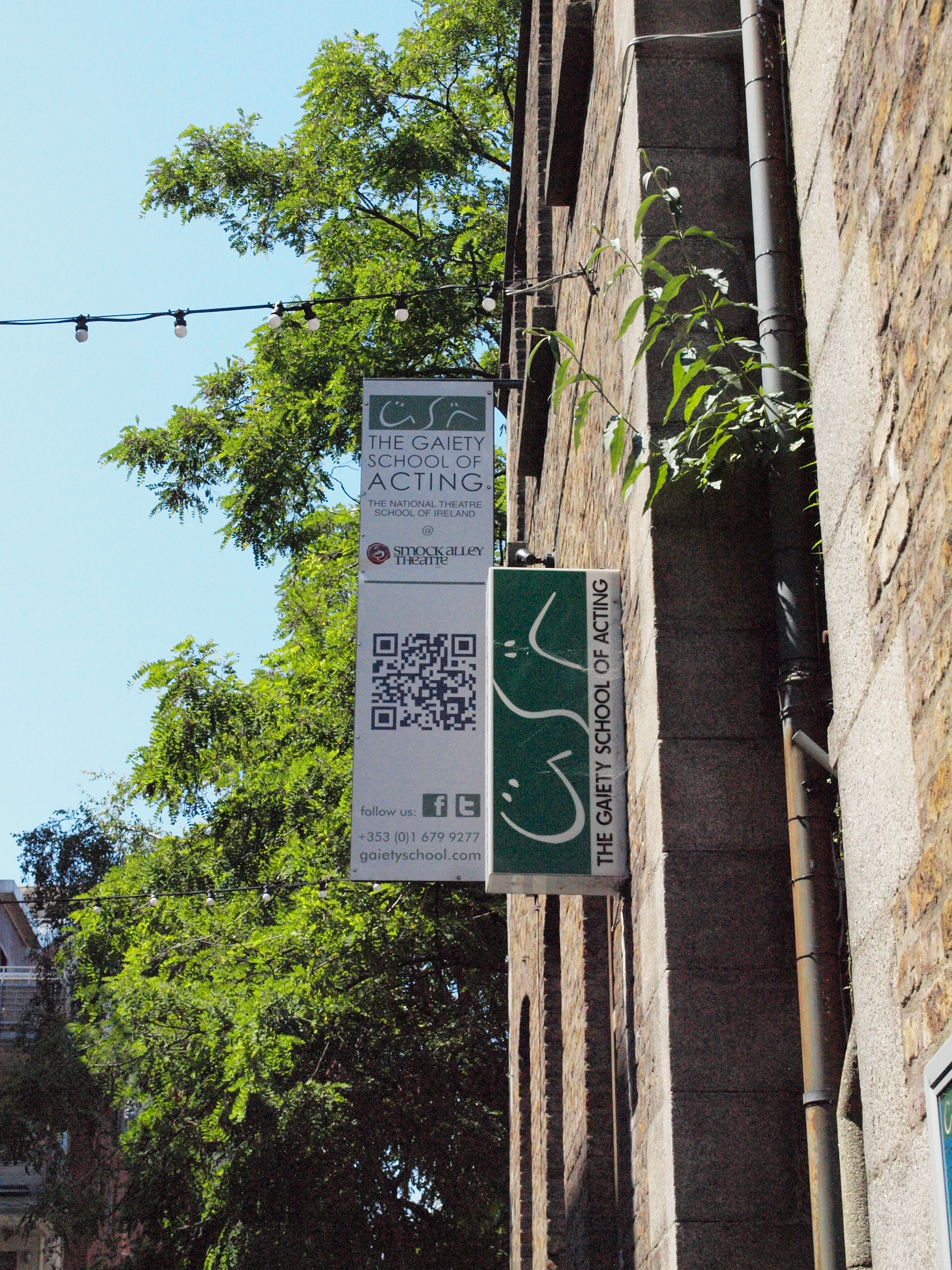
Gaiety School of Acting sign

The Gaiety School of Acting (GSA) is a drama school located on Essex Street West in Temple Bar, Dublin, Ireland. It was founded by theatre director Joe Dowling in 1986. Patrick Sutton, theatre director, was director of the Gaiety School of Acting for 30 years from 1993. As of 2024, the director and CEO is Will Wollen.

== Organisation and location ==
The Gaiety School of Acting was founded in 1986 and is operated as a "self-funded not-for-profit organisation". The school aims to train actors for theatre, film and television.

The school is based in Temple Bar, Dublin, with "Young Gaiety" classes also taking place in satellite locations in Bray and Malahide.

== Courses ==
The school runs a two-year full-time Professional Actor Training course, part-time and youth courses in locations across Dublin, as well as a Masters of Arts in Theatre Practice in association with University College Dublin.

One-year part-time courses include a Performance Year and Advanced Performance Year in Acting, and a Performance Theatre Company course. Shorter ten-week courses are also offered.

The school also hosts courses for international students, community and outreach schemes for Leaving Cert students, and corporate training programmes covering communication skills, leadership, and team-building events.

== Writers ==
Writers that the school has commissioned include Marina Carr, Lally Katz and Gary Duggan.

== Notable graduates ==
The full-time actor-training programme has produced graduate actors who have appeared in theatre, television and film productions both nationally and internationally. Graduates of the school have included:

- Colin Farrell
- Adam Fergus
- Sarah Greene
- Joanne King
- Becky Lynch
- Flora Montgomery
- Charlie Murphy
- Colin O'Donoghue
- Eimear O'Grady
- Aisling O'Sullivan
- Lorraine Pilkington
- Karl Shiels
- Stuart Townsend
- Aidan Turner
- Olivia Wilde
- Deirdre O'Kane
- Moe Dunford
- Don Wycherley
- Mark O'Halloran
- David Wilmot
- Eva Birthistle
- Simone Kirby
- PJ Gallagher
- Ian Lloyd Anderson

== See also ==
- Gaiety Theatre (unaffiliated)
