= Planet Rock Profiles =

- Country of origin: Ireland

Production
- Producer: Planet Rock Ltd
- Running time: 30 minutes (including adverts)

Original release
- Release: 1995 – present

Planet Rock Profiles is an Irish-produced and long-running television show consisting of a biographical profile of a band or musician. Created by Eamonn Maguire and initially presented by Dave Fanning, and later by Tom Dunne, Planet Rock Profiles has aired on RTÉ Two, ITV, Channel V, Music Country, VH1 Europe and many other music channels worldwide.
