= Simple Kid =

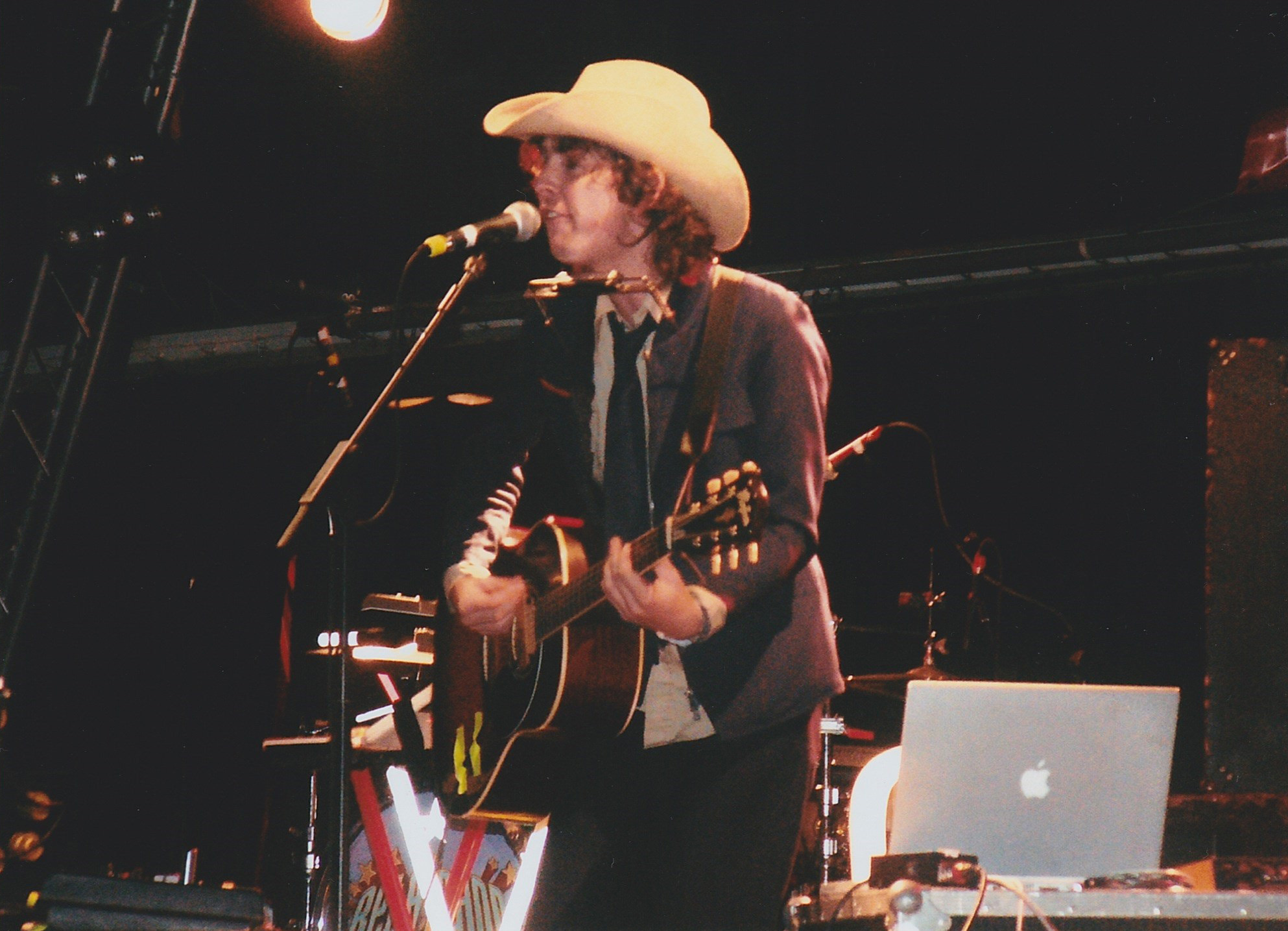

Background information
- Born: Kieran Mac Feely
- Origin: Cork, Ireland
- Genres: Alternative; Electronica; Folk; Industrial rock
- Occupations: Singer-songwriter, musician
- Instruments: Vocals, guitar, banjo, harmonica
- Labels: 2m, Vector Recordings, Gentlemen Recordings, Yep Roc Records
- Formerly of: The Young Offenders

Simple Kid, real name Kieran Mac Feely (also spelled Ciaran McFeely), is an Irish-born solo musical artist.

== History ==
Simple Kid's approach to recording involved recording to an 8-track cassette player then fed into his computer, where he applied more modern techniques to create finished songs. He mixed and mastered the tracks on albums 1 and 2 on his own equipment. His style of remixing and sampling has been compared to Fatboy Slim's, although Simple Kid used his own recordings as sources. More often his sound is compared to the similarly eclectic and deliberately ramshackle Beck.

Simple Kid's influences include folk, country (he prominently featured banjos and slide guitar in his work), glam rock (particularly T. Rex) and late-1960s big pop arrangements of records, such as The Beatles's White Album. Before becoming Simple Kid, MacFeely was a member of The Young Offenders. Forming when he was 17, the band was composed of a group of friends from Cork, Ireland. The group attempted to release an album in America but met with failure and broke up.

Television appearances included Later... with Jools Holland, Late Night with Conan O'Brien, The Late Late Show and Other Voices on RTÉ. He was also the subject of a Channel 4 (4 Play) short documentary and appeared on TFI Friday with The Young Offenders. His first album was promoted extensively in the US by DJ Nic Harcourt on KCRW's daily radio program Morning Becomes Eclectic.

His second album, 2, was released by Country Gentleman Recordings in October 2006 in the UK, and by Yep Roc Records in August 2007 in the U.S. 2 was included in Mojo magazine's top 50 albums of the year, was CD of the week in The Times culture section and had positive reviews in the NME, The Guardian, Time Out and the Independent on Sunday. Rolling Stone featured Simple Kid as a breakthrough act for 2007.

The track "Lil' King Kong" from 2 was featured in a Saturn automobile advertisement in the US, in an advertisement in the UK for the mobile phone operator Orange, and in the film Jumper in 2008.

In early 2011, the artist's official website announced that there would be no further music nor tours by Simple Kid. Despite this announcement, a new Simple Kid single, "The Road", appeared for sale in Spring 2012. An unreleased track, "Snakes and Ladders", is archived on BBC Sounds; it was recorded in 2013 for BBC Radio 4 series Forever Young and details the trials and tribulations of balancing professional musicianship with the prospect of raising a family. The song is a duet with his pregnant wife.

In December 2018 Simple Kid started to release new music again. Song titles include "Lost in Space (The Forgotten Man)", "The End Of America", "I Think We're Gonna Be Good Friends", "Nobel Prize", "The Only Child", "If You Could Talk to Your Teenage Self?", "The Last Bus Home", "Robot Lion and Grey Ghost" and "Only When We're Young". Several of these songs were compiled as the album Simple Kid 3: Health & Safety, released in July 2022. Simple Kid returned to performing in April 2023 after a 15-year hiatus.

== Discography ==
=== 1 (a.k.a. Simple Kid 1 or SK1) ===
Released September 2003 (UK), June 2004 (US)

1. "Hello"
2. "Truck On" #38 UK
3. "Staring at the Sun"
4. "The Average Man"
5. "The Commuter"
6. "Drugs"
7. "Loves an Enigma"
8. "Supertramps and Superstars"
9. "Kids Don't Care"
10. "Breakups Breakdowns"
11. "No News"

=== 2 (a.k.a. Simple Kid 2 or SK2) ===
Released October 2006 (UK), August 2007 (US)

1. "Lil' King Kong"
2. "Self Help Book"
3. "The Twenty Something"
4. "Old Domestic Cat"
5. "Serotonin"
6. "A Song of Stone"
7. "The Ballad of Elton John"
8. "You"
9. "Oh Heart, Don't Be Bitter"
10. "Mommy N Daddy"
11. "Loves an Enigma Part II"

=== Simple Kid 3: Health & Safety ===
Released July 2022

1. "The Road"
2. "Only When We're Young"
3. "Robot Lion and Grey Ghost"
4. "Cry Baby"
5. "Failed Musician"
6. "If You Could Talk To Your Teenage Self?"
7. "The End of America?"
8. "Nobel Prize"
9. "Lost in Space (Forgotten Man)"
10. "Freaks"
11. "One Day Off From Your Life (Lockdown Theme)"
12. "Last Bus Home"
13. "The Middle Ages"
14. "Trampolining"
