= Jerry Fish & The Mudbug Club =

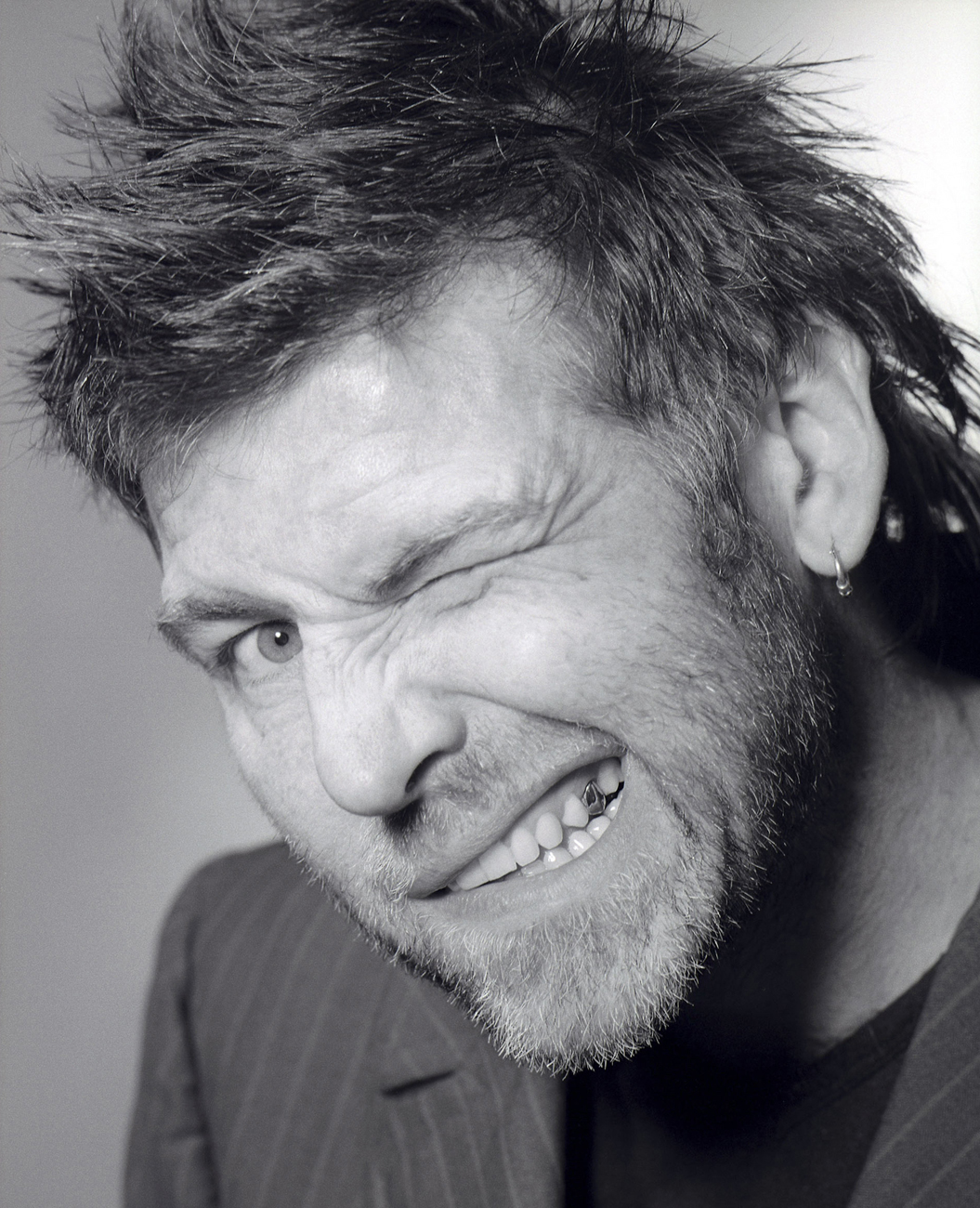
- Jerry Fish

Background information
- Origin: Dublin, Ireland
- Genres: Alternative
- Years active: 2002–present
- Labels: The Mudbug Club, Rubyworks Records
- Website: http://www.jerry-fish.com

Jerry Fish & The Mudbug Club are an independent alternative band from Ireland.

Jerry Fish is the alter ego of musician and record producer Gerard Whelan (who also leads the band An Emotional Fish) who founded an independent record label and the band Jerry Fish & The Mudbug Club, an eclectic, roots collective of musicians, friends and songs inspired in part by a musical circus troupe from Barcelona, the movie soundtracks of Quentin Tarantino and the music of New York City artists Lou Reed, Marc Ribot and Willy DeVille (Mink DeVille).

The band's sound has been described as a mix of 'lounge lizard schmooze and mariachi passion' and 'punk Latino'.

Jerry Fish & The Mudbug Club released the debut album Be Yourself in September 2002 and had a top ten hit in Ireland with the song True Friends after it was used in a television advertisement for Vodafone, the album went on to achieve multi-platinum sales in Ireland and was released in the U.K. in 2003 to critical acclaim. Be Yourself also includes contributions from Irish singer Damien Rice.

Jerry Fish was given an Irish Music Award at the 2003 Meteor Awards for best Roots/Country Artist and went on to present the second series of the music television programme Other Voices produced by Phillip King that same year.

The Mudbug Club toured Be Yourself in Ireland and the U.K. throughout 2002, 2003 and 2004 and became a festival favourite in the United Kingdom and Ireland playing Glastonbury Festival, The Isle of Wight Festival, V Festival, T in the Park, Oxegen and The Electric Picnic. In 2004 Jerry Fish & The Mudbug Club recorded and released a live album and DVD Live at The Spiegeltent - floating on The River Liffey, recorded at the Palais de Glase Spiegeltent as part of The Dublin Fringe Festival.

In 2009, the band released The Beautiful Untrue featuring guest vocals from rockabilly singer Imelda May and indie singer Carol Keogh. The Beautiful Untrue entered the Irish charts at number 7.

In the same year, Fish also recorded an album with the actors Michael Madsen, David Carradine and Harry Dean Stanton, and the singer Iggy Pop, with the contributors reciting poems written by Madsen. Fish and Madsen signed a deal to make three records together, released on Fish's "The Mudbug Club" label . Fish also composed music to appear on the tracks as a soundscape. No release date has been named yet for the album.

At Christmas 2010, the song Back to Before from the album The Beautiful Untrue featured in a television and radio advertisement in Spain and Portugal for the department store chain El Corte Inglés.

In 2011, The Beautiful Untrue was released in Spain by Warner Music.

== Discography ==
Albums

- Be Yourself, 2002
- Live At The Spiegeltent, 2004
- The Beautiful Untrue, 2009

DVD

- Live At The Spiegeltent, 2004 (Free Bonus DVD on CD Limited Edition)
