= 2003 Meteor Awards =

Irish music awards ceremony

- Date: 3 March 2003
- Location: Point Theatre
- Country: Ireland
- Presented by: Dara Ó Briain

Television/radio coverage
- Network: Network 2

The 2003 Meteor Music Awards were hosted by comedian Dara Ó Briain. It was the third edition of Ireland's national music awards. Actors Colin Farrell, Colm Meaney, and Stephen Rea were among the presenters.

== Performances ==
There were performances on the night from the ill-fated Irish pop group Six who performed the song "After the Gold Rush", Tom Jones, The Thrills, B2K, Alabama 3, Samantha Mumba, Westlife, and Sinéad O'Connor.

== Nominations ==
For 2003 nominees, see here.

=== List of winners ===
- Best Irish Group: U2
- Best Irish Female Singer: Carly Hennessy
- Best Irish Males Singer: Mundy
- Best Folk/Traditional Act: John Spillane
- Best Irish Album: Mic Christopher, Skylarkin'
- Best Irish Dance Act: Luke Thomas
- Best Pop Act: Westlife
- Best Radio DJ: Ian Dempsey
- Best Country/Roots Artist: Jerry Fish
- Best Irish New Act: The Thrills
- Best International Group: Coldplay
  - The Flaming Lips
  - Foo Fighters
  - Oasis
  - The Strokes
- Best International Male: Eminem
  - David Gray
  - Chris Martin
  - Bruce Springsteen
  - Robbie Williams
- Best International Female: Avril Lavigne
  - Norah Jones
  - Alicia Keys
  - Kylie Minogue
  - Shakira
- Best International Album: Red Hot Chili Peppers, By the Way
  - Coldplay, A Rush of Blood to the Head
  - Robbie Williams, Escapology
  - The Streets, Original Pirate Material
  - Bruce Springsteen, The Rising
  - The Flaming Lips, Yoshimi Battles the Pink Robots
- Best Visiting Live Performance: Red Hot Chili Peppers for Lansdowne Road, 2002
  - Alabama 3
  - Coldplay
  - Prince
  - Paul Simon
  - The Streets
- Hope for 2003 Award: Rubyhorse
- Lifetime Achievement Award: Bob Geldof
- Humanitarian Award: Bono
- The Industry Award: Phil Coulter
