= Addicted to Company Pt. 1 =

Studio album by Paddy Casey
- Released: 7 September 2007 (Ireland); 1 April 2008 (US)
- Genre: Rock

Paddy Casey chronology
Living (2003)	Addicted to Company Pt. 1 (2007)

Addicted to Company Pt. 1 is the third album by Irish singer Paddy Casey. It was released in Ireland on 7 September 2007, and in the US on 1 April 2008, by the Victor Records label.

== Track listing ==
_{All tracks by Paddy Casey}

1. "Sound Barrier" – 4:36
2. "Addicted to Company" – 3:53
3. "U'll Get By" – 4:54
4. "Fear" – 3:44
5. "Become Apart" – 5:10
6. "City" – 5:03
7. "Not Out to Get You" – 4:23
8. "Refugee" – 3:45
9. "Tonight" – 4:43
10. "I Keep" – 3:30
11. "Leaving" – 4:41
12. "U and I" – 4:51
13. "It's Over Now" – 6:53

== Personnel ==
- Tom Bender – mixing assistant
- David Bianco – percussion, backing vocals, handclapping, engineer, horn arrangements, foot stomping
- Paddy Casey – electric Guitar, acoustic guitar, bass, harmonica, percussion, arranger, keyboards, vocals, backing vocals, wind, xylophone, handclapping, producer, engineer, horn arrangements, string arrangements
- John Colbert – bass, backing vocals
- Andy Coogan - Guitars and Ebow
- Pat Donne – arranger, drums, producer, engineer, horn arrangements, string arrangements
- George Drakoulias – percussion, arranger, backing vocals, handclapping, producer, horn arrangements, foot stomping
- Steve Ferrone – drums
- James Gadson – drums
- Mick Guzauski – mixing
- Larry Hamby – A&R
- Nicole Hudson – violin, viola
- Bob Ludwig – mastering
- Ray Martin – trumpet, horn, horn arrangements, string arrangements
- Tim McGrath – drums
- Rob O'Geibheannaigh – flute
- Declan O'Rourke – backing vocals
- David Ralicke – horn, horn arrangements
- Rafael Serrano – assistant engineer
