= Since Kyabram =

Studio album by Declan O'Rourke
- Released: 15 October 2004
- Genre: Folk rock
- Length: 46:00
- Label: N4

Declan O'Rourke chronology
Since Kyabram (2004)	Big Bad Beautiful World (2007)

Since Kyabram is the first album by singer-songwriter Declan O'Rourke, released in 2004.

== Track listing ==
1. "No Place to Hide"
2. "Birds of a Feather"
3. "Galileo (Someone Like You)"
4. "Your World"
5. "No Brakes"
6. "We Didn't Mean to Go to Sea"
7. "1-Way Minds"
8. "Love Is the Way"
9. "Sarah (Last Night in a Dream)"
10. "Everything Is Different"
11. "Marrying the Sea"/"Til Death Do Us Part"

== Charts ==
Chart performance for Since Kyabram
Chart (2004)	Peak position
Irish Albums (IRMA)	5
