= Living (Paddy Casey album) =

Studio album by Paddy Casey
- Released: 17 October 2003
- Recorded: Ireland
- Genre: Folk
- Length: 56:23
- Label: Sony Music UK

Paddy Casey chronology
Amen (So Be It) (1999)	Living (2003)	Addicted to Company Pt. 1 (2008)

Professional ratings
Review scores
Source	Rating
AllMusic	4/5 stars

Living is the second album by Irish musician Paddy Casey, it was released on 17 October 2003. It was re-released with a bonus disc featuring B-sides and live tracks on 26 November 2004.

== Track listing ==
Original Release

1. Livin'
2. The Lucky One
3. Saints & Sinners
4. Bend Down Low
5. Want It Can't Have It
6. Don't Need Anyone
7. Promised Land
8. All In A Day
9. Stumble
10. Anyone That's Yet To Come
11. Miracle
12. Self Servin' Society

Bonus Disc

1. Don't Need Anyone (Demo, B-side of Saints & Sinners)
2. Shine (B-side of Whatever Gets You True)
3. The Whole Of The Moon (Live with The Frames at the A Wee Night For Uaneen gig in the Olympia)
4. Fear (Radio promo)
5. The Lucky One (Demo, B-side of The Lucky One)
6. Bend Down Low (Live at The Olympia)
7. Reach Out (B-side of Want It Can't Have It)
8. Can't Wait (Demo)
9. Family Tree (Radio promo)
