= Jenny Huston =

Irish journalist (born 1973)

- Born: 24 August 1973 (age 53); Vancouver, British Columbia, Canada
- Other name: DJ J Huse
- Presenting career
- Show: Jenny Huston
- Station: RTÉ 2fm
- Time slot: Monday to Thursday 9-11pm
- Style: Disc jockey
- Country: Ireland
- Previous shows: The Girrly Hour, The Snug, The Waiting Room, The Annex
- Website: web.archive.org/web/20070224082017/http://www.rte.ie/2fm/jennyhuston

Jenny Huston (born 24 August 1973) is a Canadian presenter of radio and television in Ireland. She was disc jockey on RTÉ 2fm, an occasional presenter on RTÉ Radio 1 and a television presenter with channels operated by Raidió Teilifís Éireann.; Huston presents an indie rock and pop music show on Friday nights and a rock anthems show which is broadcast on Sunday nights. A highlight of her television career was co-hosting RTÉ's Electric Picnic coverage with Tom Dunne in 2006.

In July 2006, Huston fronted RTÉ 2fm's coverage of Oxegen that summer. She has broadcast for RTÉ 2fm at Oxegen 2007, Oxegen 2008 and Oxegen 2009, as well as continuing her coverage of the Electric Picnic for the radio station. She is regularly dispatched to musical events such as Electric Picnic, Oxegen and South by Southwest for live broadcasting purposes.

In 2011 she gained listeners in the JNLRs.

== Career ==
=== Books ===
Huston's book In Bloom—Irish Bands Now was released on 27 November 2009. The book features interviews with fifteen contemporary musical acts. Several of the bands featured in the book accompanied her to the book's launch at Wicklow Street's Tower Records.

== Personal life ==
Huston's family live in Canada and Ireland; her mother in Kilkenny, a brother and sister in Canada. On her official website, Jenny lists the PJ Harvey album To Bring You My Love or Pixies album Surfer Rosa as "probably" her favourite album of all time, and Beastie Boys, Ministry and Radiohead as—so far—the best gigs she has ever been to.

She is a close friend of rival Canadian disc jockey Alison Curtis from Today FM. Huston showed Curtis a picture of Future Kings of Spain and said, "I think you'd like him [bassist, Anthony Hegarty]", with Curtis replying, "Oh I don't think so. He's kinda pretty". Curtis met him later that night, then deciding: "Actually I do [like him]. I'll have a piece of that [Hegarty] please". This piece turned into a 2007 marriage after a long-term relationship.

== Awards ==
Huston received Best DJ nominations at both the 2005 and 2006 Meteor Awards but lost out on both occasions to Ray D'Arcy from Today FM.

Year	Nominee / work	Award	Result
2005	Jenny Huston	Best DJ at the Meteor Awards	Nominated
2006	Jenny Huston	Best DJ at the Meteor Awards	Nominated
