= Declan O'Rourke =

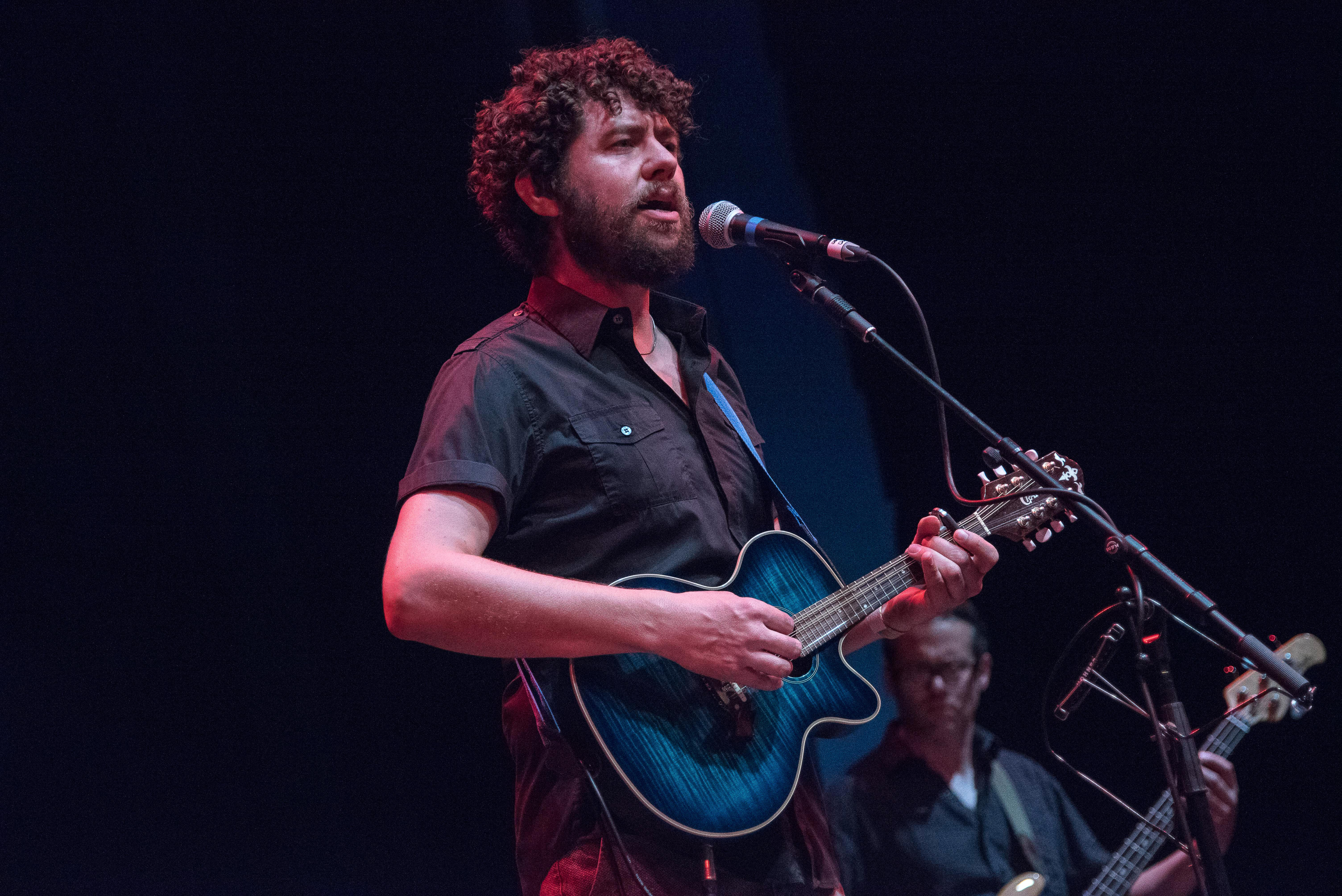
- Declan O'Rourke in 2016

Background information
- Born: 26 April 1976 (age 50); Dublin, Ireland
- Genres: Acoustic, folk, rock
- Occupation: Singer-songwriter
- Instruments: Vocals, harmonica, acoustic guitar, mandolin, ukulele, piano
- Years active: 2004–
- Label: N4, V2
- Website: DeclanORourke.com

Declan O'Rourke (born April 26, 1976) is a singer-songwriter from Dublin, Ireland.

== Career ==
=== Early career to 2010 ===
At the age of 13, when living in Australia with his family, O'Rourke was given his first guitar by a priest in Kyabram who recognised his potential and love for music, hence the title of his debut album Since Kyabram, released in October 2004.

The album's launch took place over three sold-out nights in Whelan's and was broadcast live on national radio. Since Kyabram entered the official Irish album charts at Number 5 and was the only new Irish entry in the Top 75 album chart that week. Since Kyabram quickly went gold, then achieved double-platinum status. Since the release of the album, O'Rourke has completed multiple sell-out nationwide Irish tours, the second of these culminating in a full capacity show in Dublin's Olympia Theatre in March 2005.

O'Rourke has been among the few solo performers selected to appear on both the second and third TV series of Other Voices. O'Rourke tracks were included on the No. 1 selling compilations Even Better than the Real Thing Vol. 2 and Even Better than the Real Thing Vol. 3 in aid of The National Children's Hospital in Tallaght and Tsunami Relief Fund.

O'Rourke performed at the first Irish Woodstock in Inistioge, Kilkenny. He has played guitar on stage with Bic Runga on her European tour, Snow Patrol on the UK and Irish legs of their 2006 tour, including performances at Wembley Arena and their sold-out December performance at the old Point Theatre in Dublin. O'Rourke opened multiple shows for Planxty during the come-back concerts at Vicar Street, Dublin. He performed on the same bill as Bob Dylan for three consecutive shows while playing guitar with Paddy Casey. O'Rourke played guitar for Snow Patrol during their Oxegen Festival performance in Ireland in July 2007. Snow Patrol's lead singer, Gary Lightbody, gave a very positive review of O'Rourke's second album, a preview copy of which, he revealed, the band had been listening to backstage.

O'Rourke attracted praise from Paul Weller for his song "Galileo (Someone Like You)" (co-written by Seamus Cotter) which he cited in an interview with Q Magazine as the song he most wished he'd written from the past twenty years; he later included O'Rourke's recording of the song on an album of his favourite songs included with a special edition of the magazine dedicated to him. Weller invited O'Rourke to perform at the 100 Club in London. And, on his recent mini-residency at the Olympia Theatre, Dublin, Weller invited O'Rourke on stage as a special guest to perform a duet of "Galileo". Other notable fans of O'Rourke are Rolling Stones guitarist, Ronnie Wood, Chris Rea, and Paul Brady who describes O'Rourke as a "most talented singer-songwriter... [possessing] a rich, soulful, musical voice and a brilliant instrumental ability". Eddi Reader once said that he was "one of the finest songwriters on the planet".

In October 2007 Declan released his second album, Big Bad Beautiful World after performing selected tracks on Irish radio. Big Bad Beautiful World beat its forerunner by debuting at number 4 in the Irish charts, but unlike Since Kyabram it was released in Ireland alone. O'Rourke released two singles from the album, the title track 'Big Bad Beautiful World' and 'Whatever Else Happens', both of which are performance standards for him. Following the album release, O'Rourke was nominated for Best Irish Male at the 2008 Meteor Ireland Awards. O'Rourke completed limited tours of South-Eastern Australia in 2008 and 2009, finishing the latter tour with a sold-out performance at Sydney's The Basement venue, which was filmed for later broadcast by ABC Australia.

In October 2010, O'Rourke was invited to open shows for American singer-songwriter John Prine in Virginia. Since 2006, in addition to Prine and Snow Patrol, O'Rourke has completed tours with Paulo Nutini, Paul Weller, Paul Brady, The Cardigans, and Nizlopi, among others.

=== Mag Pai Zai to Arrivals ===
In April 2011, O'Rourke released his third studio album. Mag Pai Zai under his own label, Rimecoat Records. It topped the success of his first two albums, holding its own in Ireland's Top 10 Album Charts for four consecutive weeks, and made 'Album of the Week' on BBC Radio Scotland and RTE Radio 1. 'A Little Something,' the album's first single climbed to no. 2 in Today FM's Top 40 Singles Charts. Mag Pai Zai also made it into The Irish Times' ‘101 Irish Albums to Hear Before You Die.' The album title is the phonetic representation of 'Magpie's Eye', a term that appears in the track, Langley's Requiem. It is based on the true story of the Collyer brothers, a pair of hermits in New York, who in the 1940s were found dead amid mountains of rubbish they had hoarded in their Harlem brownstone.

In 2013, Mag Pai Zai was released in the US, becoming O'Rourke's first release stateside. The album garnered attention from national media outlets, The Wall Street Journal, Spin, American Songwriter, Travel & Leisure, NPR’s World Café and USA Today. American Songwriter streamed the entire album upon its release.

From Oct 2014 to Sept 2015, O’Rourke decided to try something completely new, releasing a brand new track every month exclusively to subscribers of his mailing list and followers on social media platforms. He called the project Howlin’ Lowly Moons.

O’Rourke released his fourth studio album Gold Bars in the Sun in late 2015. The album was the artist's first Vinyl release. Gold Bars in the Sun was largely composed of songs featured in the Howlin’ Lowly Moons project, and included ‘Lets Make Big Love’ a duet with John Prine.

In October 2016 O'Rourke released, In Full Colour, the culmination of his previous work spanning a dozen sold-out concerts over 10 years, performing with the accompaniment of a full Orchestra. The fifth studio album consists of 16 tracks, all backed by the RTE Concert Orchestra. It reflects the evolution, and journey his songs have taken as a result of these highly energised, sold-out concerts, and includes re-imagined, re-recorded, versions of some of the artist's most popular material, along with brand new songs including the acclaimed ‘Children of 16’. The record, released on the ‘Maiesta Music’ record label, and distributed by Warners, reached the highest chart position yet for O’Rourke in the Irish charts, climbing as high as number 3.

In October 2017, a song cycle 15 years in the making was released, chronicling stories of the great Irish famine. A culmination of 25 books on the history of Irish workhouses and one of Ireland's darkest histories, Chronicles of the Great Irish Famine featured some of the best musicians the Irish traditional music world has to offer. Mick McGoldrick, Dermot Byrne, Floriane Blancke, Jack Maher, Chris Herzberger, Catriona Frost, Rob Calder and John Sheahan all feature on the album.

== Acting ==
In 2026, the Australian-produced film Almost With You, with O’Rourke in the lead and composing much of the soundtrack, was shown at the Galway Film Fleadh.

== Notable recordings by other artists ==
Scottish singer Eddi Reader recorded "Galileo (Someone Like You)" for her 2007 album Peacetime and O'Rourke's anthem "Love is the Way" on her 2009 album Love is the Way. Jacqui Dankworth, daughter of Jazz legends Cleo Laine and the late Sir John Dankworth recorded O'Rourke's "Galileo (Someone Like You)" for her 2009 album Back To You. Swedish pop singer Peter Jöback recorded O'Rourke's "(I Can See) A Little Something" for his eleventh studio album East Side Stories released in 2009. Josh Groban recorded "Galileo (Someone Like You)" on his fifth studio album Illuminations released in November 2010. In November 2011 the album This is the Moment recorded by Paul Byrom, formerly of Celtic Thunder, included "Galileo (Someone Like You)."

In 2016, Christy Moore interpreted Declan's song, 'Lightning Bird Wind River Man' featuring the track on his album, 'Lily' released by Sony Records.

== Personal life ==
O'Rourke married stuntwoman Eimear O'Grady in 2015.

== Discography ==
- Since Kyabram (2004)
- Big Bad Beautiful World (2007)
- Mag Pai Zai (2011)
- Howlin’ Lowly Moons (One Song Per Month Project) (2014)
- Gold Bars in the Sun (2015)
- In Full Colour (2016)
- Chronicles of the Great Irish Famine (2017)
- Arrivals (2021)
- Oceanic (2026)
