= Paddy Casey =

Irish singer-songwriter from Crumlin, Dublin

- Origin: Crumlin, Dublin, Ireland
- Genres: Rock, acoustic rock, folk, soul
- Occupation: Singer-songwriter/recording artist
- Instruments: Guitar, vocals, keyboards, drums, percussion, producer
- Years active: 1998–present
- Labels: Sony, S2, Sony BMG, RCA Victor
- Website: paddycaseymusic.com

Paddy Casey is an Irish singer-songwriter from Crumlin, Dublin. He has been described by Hot Press as an artist who was "at the forefront of the Irish music scene throughout the noughties" and whose music had "captured the Irish imagination".

== Biography ==
He received his first guitar when he was 12 and left home soon after. He has spoken about his experiences with homelessness during this time. He began busking in Dublin and was eventually approached by a Sony A&R Scout.

Casey released his first album Amen (So Be It) in 1999. This album was produced by Pat Donne and was certified triple platinum in Ireland, while also entering the Australian Album Charts. Casey played a range of different instruments in the short time spent recording it, and the track "Winter's Fire" featured Mundy as a guest guitarist. "Sweet Suburban Sky" surfaced the following year on the soundtrack to the award-winning US TV teen drama Dawson's Creek.

Casey received nominations for Best Irish Songwriter and Best Male Singer at the Hot Press Awards. Hot Press readers themselves voted the album Best Debut Album, as well as voting Casey the year's Most Promising Act and nominating him in seven other end of the year categories. Touring saw Casey providing support to artists such as R.E.M., Ian Brown, Ani DiFranco and The Pretenders.

Casey returned in 2003 with the multi-platinum album, Living. It became the second best selling album in Ireland in 2004. It spawned the Irish Singles Chart hits "Saints and Sinners", "The Lucky One" (in 2003), plus "Bend Down Low" and "Want It Can't Have It" (in 2004). In 2004, he won his first of two consecutive Meteor Irish Music Awards for Best Irish Male.

In 2005, Casey toured extensively in Ireland and abroad; highlights including a headline concert at the Heineken Green Energy Festival and also supported U2 on their Vertigo tour.

In 2006, Casey went to Los Angeles, California, United States, to record with George Drakoulias, who had worked at the Def Jam label with Rick Rubin. Recording at Dave Blanco's Studio in North Hollywood, Casey worked there with some renowned musicians such as James Gadson and Steve Ferrone. He returned to Ireland to finish the album in his kitchen. He worked on the rest of the album with the producer Pat Donne.

Titled Addicted to Company Pt. 1, it was released in Ireland on 7 September 2007, and in the US on 1 April 2008. In March 2008, MTV US promoted him as MTV Buzzworthy Artist on their TV channel and website and on its student-led brand, MTVU. He toured the album extensively and also toured with KT Tunstall and Augustana amongst others.

On 3 April 2008, Casey performed on the Late Show with David Letterman.

After returning from the US, Casey parted ways with Sony and Paul McGuinness, and for the next few years he began writing and recording at home. In November 2012, he released his first independent album The Secret Life Of. The first single, "Wait", featuring the Shannon Gospel Choir, was released in May 2012. Casey toured in Ireland and abroad for the last few years with frequent visits to Australia, Europe and the Middle East.

In November 2016, Casey released the single "Everything Must Change". This was the first taster taken from Casey's then forthcoming sixth album. Alongside this, he also released a new music video for the single produced by Banjoman Films. In July 2017, Casey released "Turn This Ship Around", the second single from this forthcoming album.

Paddy Casey's double album Turn This Ship Around was released on August 6, 2021. Turn This Ship Around has one side focusing on an array of acoustic songs decorated with strings and piano, and the other side featuring an array of full band tracks that span multiple genres. The album artwork was by partner, comedian Sophia Cadogan, aka Sophia Wren.

== Discography ==
=== Albums ===
- Amen (So Be It) – 28 June 1999
- Living – 17 October 2003
- Addicted to Company Pt. 1 – 7 September 2007
- The Secret Life of... – 9 November 2012
- Turn This Ship Around - 6 August 2021

=== Singles ===
| Date Released | Title | Album |
|---|---|---|
| 17 May 1999 | "Everybody Wants" | Amen (So Be It) |
| 22 October 1999 | "Whatever Gets You True" | Amen (So Be It) |
| 4 February 2000 | "Fear" | Amen (So Be It) |
| 7 March 2003 | "Family Tree" | n/a (Available on B-Sides Collection) |
| 3 October 2003 | "Saints and Sinners" | Living |
| 5 December 2003 | "The Lucky One" | Living |
| 20 March 2004 | "Bend Down Low" | Living |
| 9 July 2004 | "Want It Can't Have It" | Living |
| 7 February 2005 | "Saints and Sinners" (UK Release) | Living |
| 24 August 2007 | "Addicted to Company" | Addicted to Company Pt. 1 |
| 22 November 2007 | "You'll Get By" | Addicted to Company Pt. 1 |
| 20 March 2008 | "Not Out to Get You" | Addicted to Company Pt. 1 |
| July 2012 | "Wait" | The Secret Life of... |
| Nov 2012 | "It's Really Up To You" | The Secret Life of... |
| 7 May 2013 | "Lightsong/This Ain't Love" | The Secret Life of... |
| 25 July 2014 | "Out of Control" | (single) |
| 16 November 2016 | "Everything Must Change" | Turn This Ship Around |
| 22 July 2017 | "Turn This Ship Around" | Turn This Ship Around |

=== Compilations ===
- Songbook (The Best of Paddy Casey) – 10 October 2014

=== Compilation Appearances ===
- Together with the Dublin Gospel Choir, Casey recorded two songs for the Even Better than the Real Thing Vol. 2 album: a new version of his own "Saints and Sinners", and cover medley featuring Bill Withers' "Grandma's Hands" and Blackstreet's "No Diggity".

== Awards ==
=== Meteor Music Awards ===
| Year | Nominated work | Award | Result |
|---|---|---|---|
| 2009 | Addicted to Company Pt 1 | Best Irish Album | Won |
