= Dave Fanning =

Disk jockey and journalist from Ireland

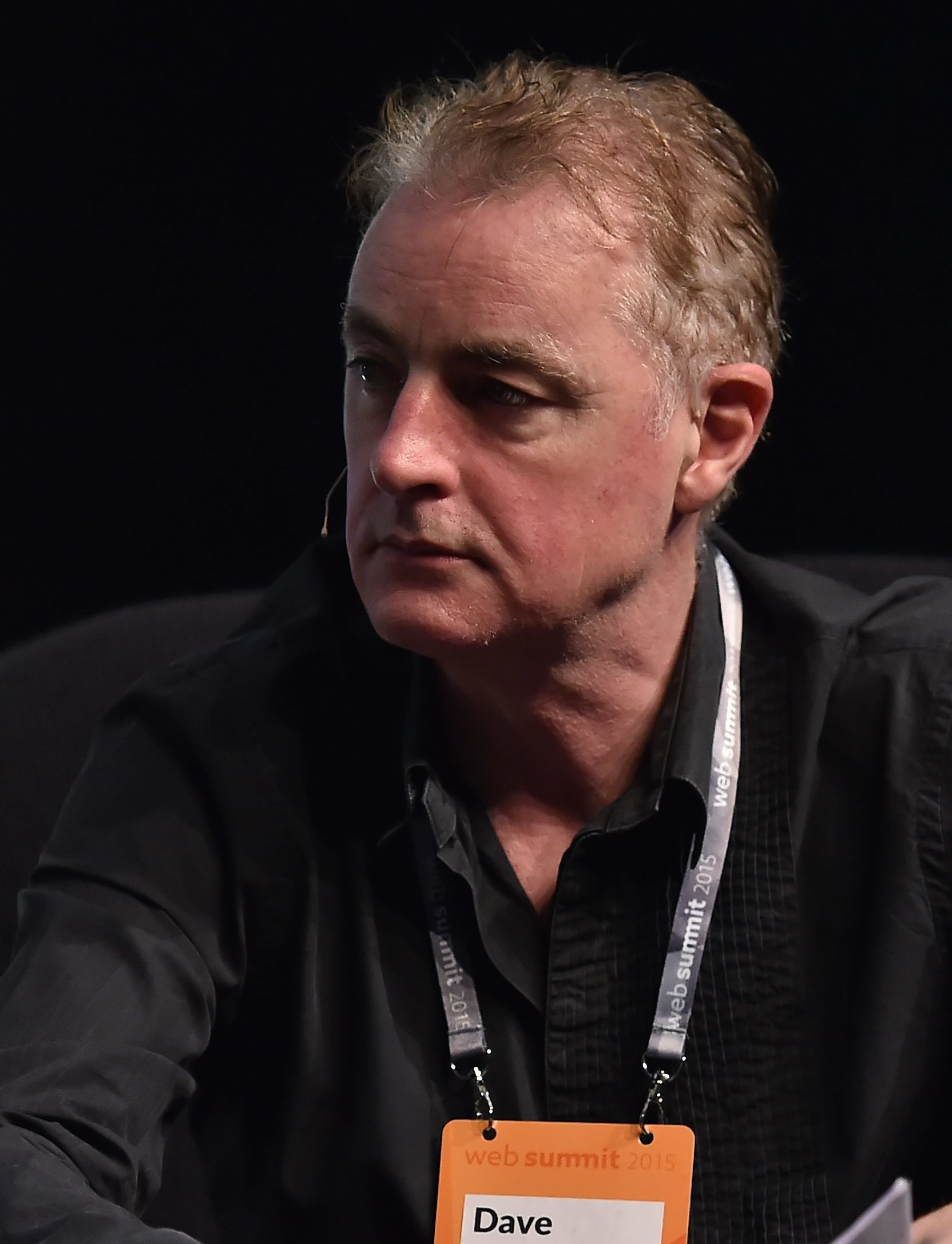
- Dave Fanning at 2015 Web Summit Music Stage
- Born: David Fanning; 27 February 1956 (age 70); Dublin, Ireland
- Education: English and Philosophy degree/Higher Diploma in Education
- Alma mater: University College Dublin
- Occupations: Radio and television presenter
- Employer: RTÉ
- Agent: Noel Kelly
- Known for: Music industry work, friendship with U2, Fanning's Fab 50
- Spouse: Ursula Courtney
- Children: Jack, Robert and Hayley

David Fanning (born 27 February 1956) is an Irish television and radio broadcaster, rock journalist, DJ, film critic and author. Fanning currently hosts weekend midday magazine/chat show The Dave Fanning Show on the Irish national radio station RTÉ 2fm and a number of RTÉ Radio 1 programmes. He regularly deputises on RTÉ Radio 1 across a range of primetime programmes and also presented his own Monday-Friday 9 am show Mornings With Dave Fanning in 2015.

Due to his friendship with U2, Fanning has for four decades been granted the first airing of any of the band's new singles before anyone else in the world, with band members often calling Fanning to tell him what they are doing. He has presented more than twenty different TV shows for RTÉ Television, from 2TV to The Movie Show. He also hosted RTÉ's live television coverage of Live 8 in Hyde Park, London (July 2005), and Live Earth in Wembley Stadium, London (July 2007). He has conducted over 200 interviews with global rock stars.

Fanning has been the recipient of a number of 'Best DJ' awards from various publications, including Hot Press where he topped the annual readers' Poll for over twenty years. In 1980, he was the first person outside of RTÉ Radio 1 to be honoured with a prestigious Jacob's Award for "the depth and scope" of his radio show. Following Christy Moore in 1990 and preceding Van Morrison in 1992, Fanning was awarded the IRMA Special Industry Award in 1991. In recent years he has been the recipient of a number of accolades and awards ranging from the 2012 Dublin Lord Mayor's Award ("To the voice of Irish Radio, in recognition of his broadcasting career, his support of new Irish talent and for bringing alternative Irish music to an Irish audience") to the 2014 University College Dublin Music Society Award. (The Honorary Fellowship citation reads "in recognition of his outstanding contribution to music through his work as a journalist, DJ and broadcaster – in particular his support of homegrown Irish talent"). He won numerous IRMA awards and was nominated for Best DJ at The Meteor Music Awards on seven occasions, winning four times. U2 performed a special tribute when he won the Special Industry award in 2004. In 2016, he was inducted into the Irish Radio Hall of Fame.

Hot Press regards Fanning as "one of the most familiar faces and voices in Irish broadcasting", summing up his impact: "When Billboard magazine referred to the introduction of 2FM as one of the major factors behind the growth of Ireland as a major music centre, they really meant Dave Fanning". Rob Sharp of UK newspaper The Independent has referred to him as a "legendary Irish DJ". BP Fallon commented in 2008: "Without Dave Fanning on the radio, music in Ireland would have had a poorer face. Dave changed things, opened up ears". In The Sunday Times of March 2020, Jim Lockhart said of Fanning "he was central to a whole generation's interface with music and he is a force of nature". The Sunday Tribune's Eithne Tynan has defined his style as a "thousand words a minute, start a whole new sentence before you've finished the previous one".

== Early and private life ==
Born in Dublin, Ireland on 27 February 1956, David Fanning is the youngest of six children (one sister, four brothers). His father, Barney, was a commissioner in the Irish Office of Public Works, his mother, a retired schoolteacher. Obsessed with music from an early age and fascinated by his older brothers’ music interests (jazz, folk, pop), his twin obsessions, during an "idyllically happy childhood" were music and movies. He was a member of The Beatles fan club from the age of eight. He was educated at Blackrock College, graduating from University College Dublin (UCD), with a degree in English and Philosophy and a Higher Diploma in Education. He began working as a DJ on the fledgling pirate radio station, Radio Dublin; that same year he took over as editor of Ireland's rock magazine (Scene). Fanning then moved to Big D when it was formed by Radio Dublin deejays in 1978. On both pirates, he presented rock shows. He continued with that format when he made the move to legal radio in 1979.

He met Gerry Ryan in 1978 while both were working in Dublin pirate radio station "Big D", sharing the common bond of both having attended college, though at separate colleges. Their friendship led them to socialise and holiday together, while the Fannings even moved in with the Ryans for a time in September 1995 when the Fanning house was under construction.

He is married to Ursula, a solicitor (formerly a TV researcher, most notably for Gay Byrne on The Late Late Show), and they have three children.

== Career ==
Fanning has written for a number of newspapers and magazines in Ireland and the UK. He has also written and presented a number of TV and radio shows in Ireland, the UK and the US. He has been a disc jockey for RTÉ 2fm since it began in 1979.

=== Radio ===
Produced and coordinated by Ian Wilson, live weekly sessions with "demo tape" bands helped establish Fanning's evening show. By the early 1980s, Fanning was seen by the industry and music fans everywhere as Ireland's answer to John Peel, BBC Radio 1 presenter. Alongside Larry Gogan, he is one of only two of the original disc jockeys to make it as far as the station's 40th anniversary in 2019.

In 1993, after a live TV interview with Richard Branson, Branson invited Fanning to join his new station Virgin Radio, where Fanning presented his own show every week. With a 4-hour Saturday afternoon programme (initially following Chris Evans’ show) broadcast live from Soho, London, Fanning stayed with Virgin Radio until September 1994.

In August 2009, after spending 3 years presenting on RTÉ Radio 1, it was announced that Fanning would be returning to RTÉ 2fm to present his evening weekday show in his old 19:00 slot.

In 2014 Fanning wrote, produced and presented a 6 hour, 6-part radio series for BBC 6 Music on the history of Irish rock. In the Summer of 2017 he wrote and presented a ten-part RTÉ Radio 1 series called Dave Fanning's History of Irish Rock.

In 2018 he worked for SiriusXM Satellite radio in New York.

Fanning has been described as "the ultimate fan, who through broadcasting has been able to make a career out of his many passions in life – chiefly, music and movies." He hosted The Dave Fanning Show, a weekend midday magazine/chat shows on the Irish national radio station RTÉ 2FM until 2023.

On 22 February 2023, Fanning announced that he was stepping away from his weekend show on RTÉ 2FM but that he would continue broadcasting on digital radio, on TV and online. Later that year, his response on radio to Christy Dignam's death from cancer was the subject of some "backlash". On 11 July, he invoked Nazi Germany as a comparison with the investigations into what RTÉ had been doing with public money. Two days later, this was raised at the Public Accounts Committee (PAC), where Fanning's reference to a "nonsensical Oireachtas Nuremberg trial" was put to newly appointed RTÉ Director General Kevin Bakhurst, who was asked "how this is appropriate... A person who is paid by the taxpayer – through his agent [Noel Kelly, also the agent of the presenter at the centre of the scandal, Ryan Tubridy] – on RTÉ saying, effectively, what the Public Accounts Committee are doing..." Bakhurst responded by stating that Fanning's remarks were "not appropriate".

=== Fanning's Fab Fifty ===
Each year since 1980 Fanning has had an annual alternative music poll called Fanning's Fab Fifty on his radio show. This is decided by a poll of the general public and, since the advent of internet voting, surfers select their own favourite three pieces of music online. U2 top the poll on a regular basis.

In 2005, Fanning released an Irish-only triple album, Fanning's Fab 50 Vol 1. Sales for this compilation album reached 1.5 times platinum. Fanning's Fab 50 Vol 2 was released for the Christmas market in 2006, also going platinum. Fanning's Fab 50 Vol 3 was released in 2007. It includes music pieces by U2, The Killers, R.E.M., Radiohead, Nick Cave, Lou Reed, Massive Attack, Paul McCartney, John Lennon, David Bowie, The Velvet Underground, Coldplay, Sigur Rós, New Order, Blur, The Verve, Ryan Adams, The Stone Roses, Iggy Pop, Oasis and over thirty others.

=== U2 ===
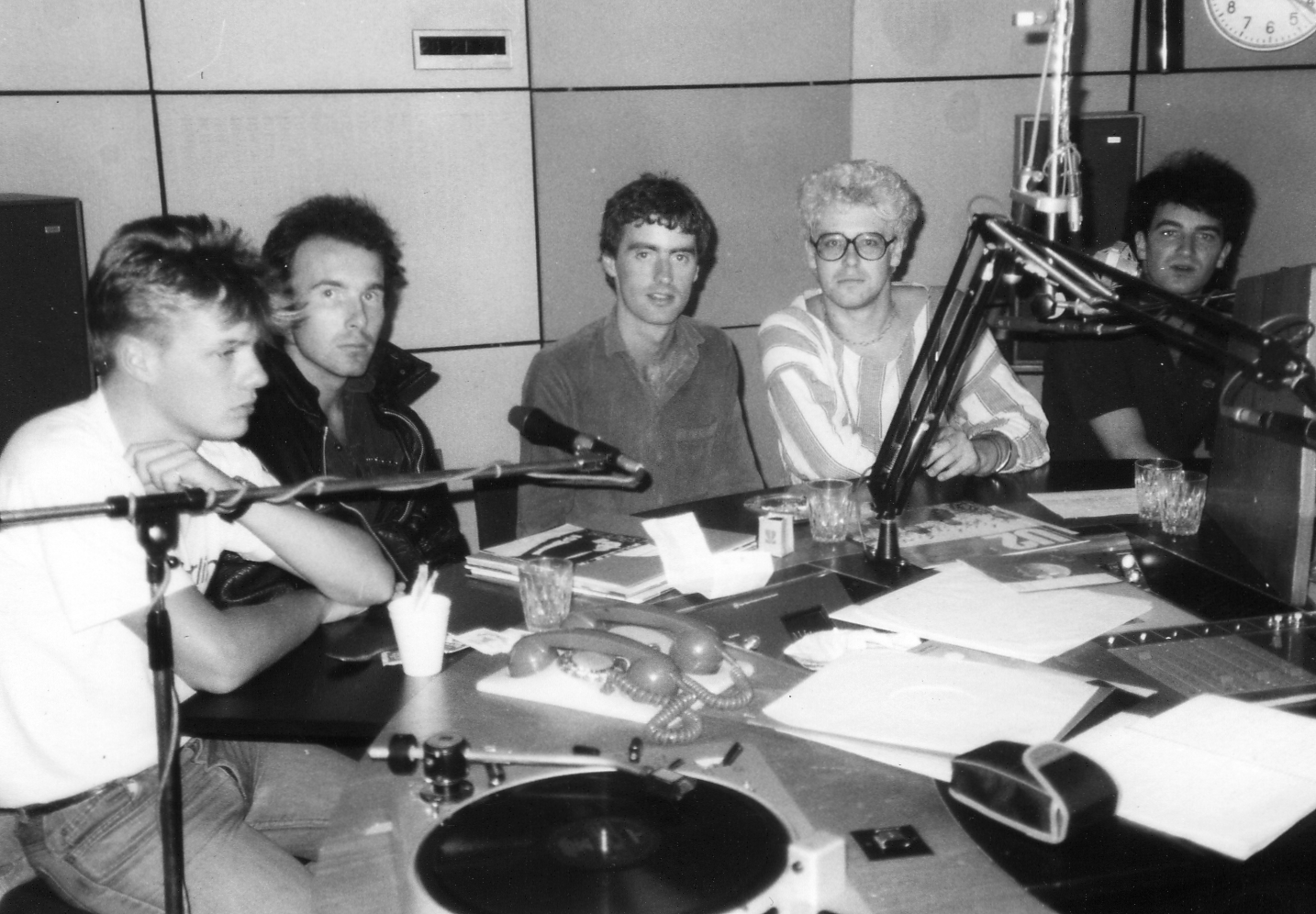
Fanning and U2 in studio, 1982

Fanning has always supported young, new Irish talent and played bands' demo tapes. With the move to RTÉ Radio 2 (RTÉ 2FM), and with producer Ian Wilson at the helm, they started The Fanning Sessions. Hundreds of sessions were recorded.

For the very first session, Fanning invited the band he had championed and played most often on demo tape over the previous 2 years – a young four-piece Dublin band called U2. His friendship with, and support for, the band, led to Fanning's listeners deciding on the A-side and B-sides of the band's first single release. (This was in the pre-CD days, when singles were only released on vinyl). The band came into Fanning's show for five nights in one week – a major seal of approval from Fanning and Wilson – and the listeners picked "Out of Control" as the first single, with "Stories for Boys" and "Boy/Girl" on the B-side.

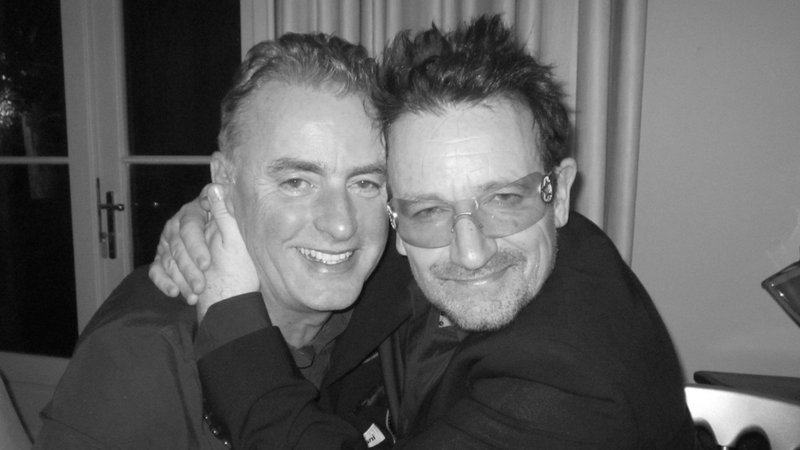
Fanning with Bono

Between 1977 and 1979, Fanning was resident DJ at Dublin's city centre McGonagles nightclub. The club hosted most local acts and many international ones. U2 played there many times. The band also played The Baggot Inn for six consecutive Tuesday nights in 1979 with support from The Blades. Fanning DJ'd for the entire run between sets. He joined the band on their tour bus through Ireland (dates in Cork, Galway, Belfast, Dublin) on the release of their third album War. He made various TV documentaries on the band – at Self-Aid in 1986, in Modena in Italy the following year during the band's Joshua Tree Tour and has interviewed the band many times on radio and TV down through the years. In 1987 at the time of the release of The Joshua Tree his annual radio interview with the band was conducted in the nude following Bono's request to "shake things up for the hell of it".

Fanning's friendship with the band has continued. At a surprise birthday party, held at Dublin's Mother Redcaps in 1989 all four members of the band paid tribute to Fanning; the band's manager Paul McGuinness presented him with a special present referring to Fanning as "the world's best DJ". Besides being guaranteed the world exclusive on all U2 releases, the band recorded a specially-filmed musical tribute to Fanning when he was presented, in 2004 (by Larry Mullen) with the Irish Music Industry's top award – The Meteor Industry Award.

In September 2016, Fanning stepped in for the band at the Rock and Roll Hall of Fame in Cleveland, Ohio for its weekend celebration of forty years of the band.

=== Television work ===
Over a number of decades, Fanning fronted over 20 television programmes for Ireland's national television station, RTÉ (these included 2TV, The Movie Show, Planet Rock Profiles, Jobsuss, The Arts Show, Music Zone, Number One, 7 Bands on the Up, What Movie, Visual Eyes. The Last Broadcast, and The 11th Hour). He has been the subject of several television specials and besides presenting various music shows, both live and recorded, he has presented political TV documentaries from Cambodia and Ethiopia.

Throughout the 1990s, Fanning wrote and presented over four hundred editions of The Movie Show, crossing the globe for one-on-one interviews with movie stars. The last episode aired in September 2001. In 2003 he presented twenty programmes in a series called 'What Movie' and later produced and directed over twenty film review programmes for Channel 6.

Fanning has also written and presented over 150 music star TV interview shows which have aired in numerous countries around the world on programmes like Planet Rock Profiles, Music Express, Fanning Profiles, Interviews With Dave Fanning. In New York for Rainbow Media's Rave TV he presented a series of rock star interview programmes in 2006 and 2007 (programmes included Noel Gallagher, Rod Stewart, Iggy Pop, Fleetwood Mac, and the Pet Shop Boys). For three years, Talks With Dave Fanning also ran on Sky Arts in the UK. He interviewed New Order for the first episode. Other episodes featured artists such as Beck, The Flaming Lips, Radiohead and PJ Harvey.

For its first four years, Fanning was a member of the panel for the Mercury Music Prize.

In the early 1990s, he presented live music shows on Britain's Channel 4. Rocksteady was filmed from various locations around The UK (from Glasgow's Barrowlands with Daniel Lanois to London's Royal Albert Hall with Eric Clapton), one in Cork with Hothouse Flowers and one live from Boston with J.J. Cale. Later (this time with co-presenter Craig Ferguson and again on Channel 4) he presented Friday at The Dome, a live music programme from Kilburn in London.

Working with Bob Geldof (who had been in Gerard Fanning's class in Blackrock College a few years ahead of Dave), Fanning was programme consultant for ITV’s The South Bank Show for the music special Cool Clear Crystal Streams.

In 2004, Fanning caused controversy when he chose to become a judge on television talent show You're a Star, to choose that year's act to represent Ireland in the Eurovision Song Contest. He explained his decision:

It’s indefensible. I just can’t defend this at all. It’s Eurovision for God’s sake. It’s all shite, everyone knows that. But I just don't care. I'm doing it for a laugh. Of course I'm going to get people slagging me off, but I'm used to all that. [...] I just thought, why not do it?" he says. "I've done everything else at this stage, including the Mercury Music Prize, IMRO Showcases and battle of the bands contests up and down the country.

In July 2005 he hosted RTÉ's 12-hour television coverage of Live 8 from London's Hyde Park and Live Earth in 2007 from Wembley Stadium.

In 2010, Fanning presented a documentary on Bono (filmed in Ireland and Ghana) for RTÉ TV in the Ireland's Greatest series.

From 2000 to 2010, Fanning wrote and presented the independently produced, late-night TV music programme The Last Broadcast (later The 11th Hour) which initially aired on Friday nights and was ninety minutes in length. By 2007, the show aired on Wednesday nights. The show became The 11th Hour in 2009, with the first episode featuring an interview with Bruce Springsteen and music from Bell X1, Franz Ferdinand and U2. Another series followed later in the year, with the first episode on The Beatles described as "superb" by Hilary Fannin, reviewer with The Irish Times.

In the summer of 2011, Fanning (with co-presenter Zoe Ball) presented 3 days of the Isle of Wight Festival (Foo Fighters, Iggy Pop, Kings of Leon, Jeff Beck and others) for Sky UK.

Fanning has contributed to numerous BBC TV music programmes, most recently BBC 4 TV's Pop Roadmap of the 80s with Midge Ure in 2018.

Also in 2018, Fanning wrote, presented and produced a highly praised TV documentary Dolores, about the Cranberries' vocalist Dolores O'Riordan, who died in January 2018.

=== Journalism/writing ===
Fanning has written articles for more than twenty publications, both at home and abroad. He was rock correspondent with The Irish Times for ten years (1982 – 1992) and movie critic for the Sunday World from 1997 to 2004.

HarperCollins in London approached Fanning to write his autobiography and The Thing Is was published in 2010. The book's positive Irish Times review began "if you were a music loving teenager in the 80s and 90s, you owe a lot to Dave Fanning" while The Independent ended its equally positive review with "that same enthusiasm for music seems to have been undimmed with years and perhaps it's that wisdom ahead of knowledge which has ensured his longevity." Bono wrote the book's lengthy foreword.

=== Other work ===
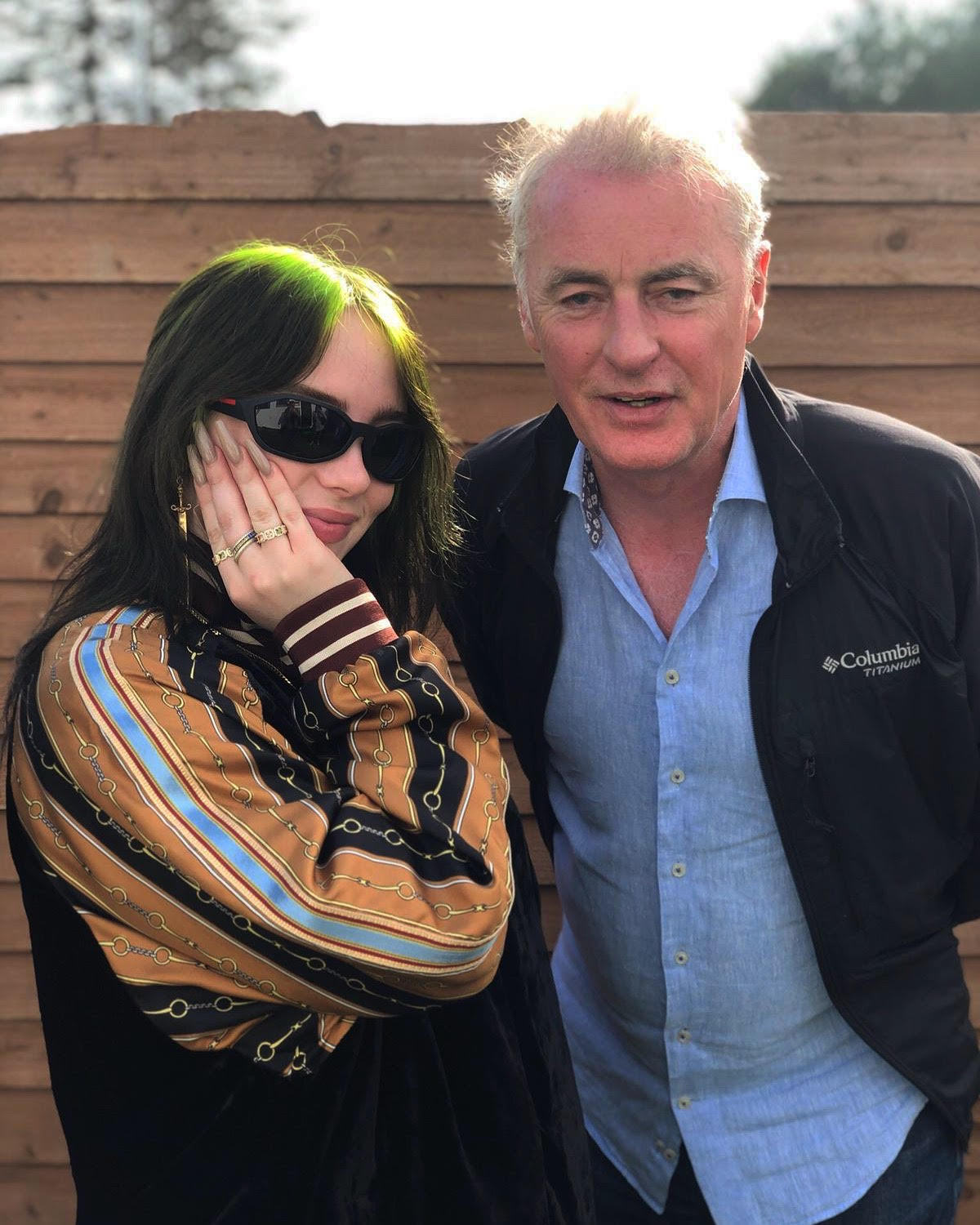
Fanning and Billie Eilish, Electric Picnic 2019

In more recent years, Fanning has conducted public interviews with celebrities and musicians at events ranging from The Dalkey Book Festival, to Dublin's Web Summit, to the Electric Picnic. These include, Richard E. Grant at University College Dublin, Jonathan Rhys-Meyers in Trinity College Dublin, filmmaker David Cronenberg at Trinity College Dublin, Glastonbury's Michael Eavis at the Aviva Stadium, Sopranos creator David Chase at the residence of the American Ambassador in Dublin's Phoenix Park, producer Steve Lillywhite at Core Media, and Billie Eilish at Electric Picnic.

Fanning wrote the sleeve notes for Ireland's first ever rock compilation album Just For Kicks.

Fanning has been a stage announcer at most major music festivals and large concerts in Ireland dating back to Bob Marley and The Wailers at Dalymount Park in 1980 and Thin Lizzy/U2 at the very first Slane concert in 1981.

For its first four years, Fanning was a member of the panel for the Mercury Music Prize.

From 2009 to 2013, he hosted the 10th Kerry Film Festival in Tralee.

Fanning is parodied by Oliver Callan.

His contributions were featured in both of the big-screen documentary films of Oasis and Coldplay – Oasis: Supersonic in 2016 and Coldplay: A Head Full of Dreams in 2018.

== Awards ==
Fanning has been the recipient of a number of 'Best DJ' awards from various publications, including Hot Press, where he topped the annual Readers' Poll for over twenty years. In 1980, he was the first person outside of RTÉ Radio 1 to be honoured with a prestigious Jacob's Award for "the depth and scope" of his radio show. Following Christy Moore in 1990 and preceding Van Morrison in 1992, Fanning was awarded the IRMA Special Industry Award in 1991. In recent years he's been the recipient of a number of accolades and awards ranging from the 2012 Dublin Lord Mayor’s Award ("To the voice of Irish Radio, in recognition of his broadcasting career, his support of new Irish talent and for bringing alternative Irish music to an Irish audience") to the 2014 University College Dublin Music Society Award. (The Honorary Fellowship citation reads "in recognition of his outstanding contribution to music through his work as a journalist, DJ and broadcaster – in particular his support of homegrown Irish talent"). He won numerous IRMA awards and was nominated for Best DJ at the Meteor Music Awards on seven occasions, winning four times. U2 performed a special tribute when he won a Special Industry Award at the 2004 Meteor Music Awards. In 2016, he was inducted into the Irish Radio Hall of Fame.
