= List of best-selling singles and albums of 2006 in Ireland =

This is a list of the top selling singles and top sellings albums in Ireland in 2006.

== Top selling singles ==
1. "Jumbo Breakfast Roll" – Pat Shortt
2. "Hips Don't Lie" – Shakira featuring Wyclef Jean
3. "That's My Goal" – Shayne Ward
4. "Everytime We Touch" – Cascada
5. "Crazy" – Gnarls Barkley
6. "I Wish I Was a Punk Rocker (With Flowers in My Hair)" – Sandi Thom
7. "A Moment Like This" – Leona Lewis
8. "SexyBack" – Justin Timberlake
9. "Smack That" – Akon featuring Eminem
10. "No Promises" – Shayne Ward

== Top selling albums ==
1. The Love Album – Westlife
2. Eyes Open – Snow Patrol
3. Ring of Fire: The Legend Of Johnny Cash – Johnny Cash
4. U218 Singles – U2
5. Gift Grub Volume 7 – Mario Rosenstock
6. Sam's Town – The Killers
7. Whatever People Say I Am, That's What I'm Not – Arctic Monkeys
8. Shayne Ward – Shayne Ward
9. Breakaway – Kelly Clarkson
10. Stadium Arcadium – Red Hot Chili Peppers

Notes:

- *Compilation albums that are composed of Various Artists are not included.

== See also ==
- List of songs that reached number one on the Irish Singles Chart
- List of artists who reached number one in Ireland
