= Alison Curtis =

Canadian musician (born 1977)

- Born: Alison Curtis; 1 November 1977 (age 48); Kingston, Ontario, Canada
- Presenting career
- Show: Weekend Breakfast with Alison Curtis
- Station: Today FM
- Time slot: Saturdays: 8:00AM-11:00AM Sundays: 9:00AM-12:00PM

Alison Curtis (born 1 November 1977 in Kingston, Ontario, Canada) is a presenter of radio on Irish radio station Today FM She currently presents her own show Weekend Breakfast with Alison Curtis on Today FM which airs every Saturday from 8:00AM–11:00AM and every Sunday from 9:00AM–12:00PM. Curtis previously presented The Last Splash on Sunday nights and The Alison Curtis Show.

The Last Splash and, later, The Alison Curtis Show, earned Curtis her three Best DJ Meteor nominations, though she narrowly lost out on the first two occasions to her Today FM colleague Ray D'Arcy and lost again in 2009, this time to her Today FM colleague Ray Foley. Curtis has written for Hot Press.

She is married to Anton Hegarty, the former bassist for Future Kings of Spain with whom she has a daughter.

== Early life ==
Curtis was born and raised in Kingston, Ontario, but spent her formative years in Toronto. She graduated from the University of Toronto with an Honours BA in Anthropology. Alongside her studies, she was actively involved in the Toronto indie scene, managing band nights, writing and editing the college paper, and drumming in a band called The Justice League.

== Career ==
After graduating, Curtis moved to Ireland. There she met another Canadian, who was searching for presenters for the then pirate radio station, Phantom, provoking the reaction: "God, you talk a lot". She was signed up and presented a drivetime show on the station. Shortly after that in 1999, she joined Today FM, as the senior researcher on The Ian Dempsey Breakfast Show. Working on a close-knit team, she was responsible for the show's features, guests and persuading Ian Dempsey to play a few "alternative" artists. She also spent 3 years presenting and producing her own drive time radio show on Phantom 105.2, a show that regularly featured live sessions from Irish and international artists as well as presenting The Last Splash on Sunday nights, she also presented an music show from Monday to Thursday at 22:00 for a time in the 1990s.

She was on the panel of judges which helped decide the Choice Music Prize for Irish Album of the Year 2006. She also served as the M.C./ master of ceremonies for the main awards ceremony for the Choice Music Prize before she was replaced by fellow Today FM colleague, Paul McLoone who from March 2012 to March or November 2016 served as M.C. for the prize ceremony of the Choice Music Prize with the Choice Music Prize later moving to be broadcast on RTE 2FM from 2017 onwards.

She also presented and produced The Last Splash on Sunday nights, which initially had 7,000 listeners; this increased over time to 40,000. She resigned from her post as producer of The Ian Dempsey Breakfast Show on the Friday before her new show (see below) began to air. The first song she played on her new first show was "Can't Go Back" by Primal Scream.

The new show was given to Curtis by the Today FM executives in 2008. The Alison Curtis Show staged its inaugural live Christmas special at Whelan's on 17 December 2008. Curtis and Ed Smith administered over three emerging acts – Cap Pas Cap, The Dirty Epics and Mick Flannery – as they did their respective things. On 22 December 2008, based upon listener suggestions from the previous three weeks, they compiled a "time capsule" for 2008, containing the top ten items representing the twelve months of the year. A Valentine's Day special of the show took place at Whelan's Upstairs on 12 February 2009, featuring music from Duke Special, One Day International and Ann Scott.

== Personal life ==
Curtis has one sibling, her twin sister Karen, a social worker in Canada. Their father died when they were fourteen and their mother died when they were nineteen. Curtis met her long-term boyfriend, Anton Hegarty, bass guitarist in Future Kings of Spain, at a show in Whelan's. They married in 2007 and now live in East Wall, Dublin. Curtis and Hegarty own two identical black cats named Scout and Jem (after the characters in To Kill a Mockingbird by Harper Lee).

Curtis watches The Daily Show, Mad Men and dislikes Amy Winehouse and Britney Spears. Her favourite Irish bands include Fight Like Apes, who she describes as "really talented... kind of rocky and metallic and their front girl is extremely watchable, almost going into Debbie Harry territory" and Hooray for Humans from Cork, who, according to Curtis, "are really cute, very poppy, almost Arcade Fire in the way they shout lyrics".

== Awards ==
While at Today FM, Curtis was nominated for the Best National DJ award on three occasions. On the first two occasions she narrowly lost out to her Today FM colleague Ray D'Arcy. Curtis was nominated in the Best National DJ category again in 2009. She lost to another Today FM colleague, Ray Foley, on this occasion.

| Year | Nominee / work | Award | Result |
|---|---|---|---|
| 2005 | Alison Curtis | Best National DJ | Nominated |
| 2006 | Alison Curtis | Best National DJ | Nominated |
| 2009 | Alison Curtis | Best National DJ | Nominated |
