= Gift Grub =

Comedic radio series

Gift Grub is a series of short comic pieces broadcast on weekdays on The Ian Dempsey Breakfast Show on the Irish commercial radio station Today FM, having been broadcast since May 1999.

== History ==
A precursor to Gift Grub originally aired on Today FM's predecessor, Radio Ireland, as a series of sketches called "Starship Compromise". This Star Trek parody featured a caricature of Gerry Adams as a starship captain accompanied by Martin McGuinness, with the two scouring the galaxy, seeking compromise with alien beings.

In 1998, presenter Ian Dempsey joined the newly renamed Today FM which had replaced Radio Ireland. A year later, in March 1999, Paul McLoone joined Today FM and became a producer for The Ian Dempsey Breakfast Show. McLoone and Irish comedian Mario Rosenstock later came up with and developed the concept of Gift Grub. The first Gift Grub sketch aired on the Ian Dempsey Breakfast Show in early May 1999. The name of the sketches have their basis in the format of the original pieces, in which the character of Bertie Ahern (Ireland's former Taoiseach) would introduce the listening public to favourite ("Gift") meals or food items ("Grub").

For the next five years, McLoone and Rosenstock participated in various sketches either together or separately with four volumes of Gift Grub being released on CD. McLoone resigned from Today FM in 2004, spending the next two years freelancing, before returning to the station in 2006. After McLoone's departure from Gift Grub, Rosenstock voiced the show's characters. These characters are generally based on real people, typically Irish or international celebrities and political figures.

In 2006, the satirist and impressionist Oliver Callan who had previously contributed to Gift Grub sketches, reportedly took legal action over the release of a compilation album of sketches.

The popularity of the show has generated a number of spin-off compilations.

Rosenstock has performed live stage versions of several sketches and characters, in shows titled "Gift Grub Live".

== Notable sketches ==
Writers of the series respond to current news and events by writing satire on recent events. One episode involved the re-writing of the song Dry Your Eyes by The Streets, in which Roy Keane sings to David Beckham, consoling him on England's loss to France in UEFA Euro 2004. In a poll of Today FM listeners, this sketch was voted the "all time favourite" Gift Grub sketch.

In 2005, a sketch entitled "José and his Amazing Technicolor Overcoat", mimicking Chelsea boss José Mourinho, caught the attention of football fans in the UK and reportedly reached number 45 in the UK singles chart. Rosenstock was invited by Mourinho to attend a match at Stamford Bridge. This track, along with "I Sign a Little Player or Two", based on Aretha Franklin's I Say a Little Prayer, were broadcast on London's Capital Gold radio station.

In December 2005, a parody of Will Young's song Leave Right Now, relating to the events surrounding Roy Keane's dismissal from Manchester United, was released as a charity single in Ireland. With proceeds going to the Irish Guide Dogs Association, it entered the charts and was the Christmas number one in 2005.

In March 2007, the real Roy Keane met with Ian Dempsey to promote the Irish Guide Dogs Foundation and was introduced to the Gift Grub Roy. Previous guests who were invited on the show to meet their Gift Grub equivalents included Hector Ó hEochagáin, Eddie Hobbs, and Ronan Keating. Bertie Ahern also joined the show to celebrate the segment's tenth anniversary.

In November 2009, Today FM released a special 10-year edition of the annual 'Best of' CD. This included 3 CDs, including a 'best of 2009' CD, a 'best of the decade' CD, and an unreleased sketches CD.

== See also ==
- Gift Grub 6: The Special One
