= List of best-selling singles and albums of 2005 in Ireland =

This is a list of the top selling singles and top sellings albums in Ireland in 2005.

== Top selling singles ==
1. "You Raise Me Up" – Westlife
2. "Lonely" – Akon
3. "(Is This the Way to) Amarillo" – Tony Christie featuring Peter Kay
4. "Axel F" – Crazy Frog
5. "Ghetto Gospel" – 2Pac
6. "You're Beautiful" – James Blunt
7. "Don't Cha" – The Pussycat Dolls featuring Busta Rhymes
8. "JCB Song" – Nizlopi
9. "Bad Day" – Daniel Powter
10. "Push the Button" – Sugababes

== Top selling albums ==
1. Back To Bedlam – James Blunt
2. Gift Grub 6: The Special One – Mario Rosenstock
3. Face to Face – Westlife
4. X&Y – Coldplay
5. Breakaway – Kelly Clarkson
6. Curtain Call: The Hits – Eminem
7. Hot Fuss – The Killers
8. Confessions on a Dancefloor – Madonna
9. American Idiot – Green Day
10. Ancora – Il Divo

Notes:

- *Compilation albums are not included.

== See also ==
- List of songs that reached number one on the Irish Singles Chart
- List of artists who reached number one in Ireland
