= The Special One =

The Special One may refer to:

- "The Special One" (Beavis and Butt-Head), a television episode
- "The Special One" (The Outer Limits), a television episode
- Gift Grub 6: The Special One, comedy sketches from Today FM's Gift Grub on Irish radio
- Special One, a 2003 rock album by Cheap Trick
- The Special One (album), a 2007 album by Yovie & Nuno
- José Mourinho, football manager who was dubbed by the media in 2004 after saying "...I think I'm a special one".
- José de Sousa, darts player nicknamed "The Special One"
