= Dear Sebastian =

2009 Irish collection of letters

Dear Sebastian is a 2009 book published by Hodder Headline Ireland. The book's content is a collection of letters from notable people in Irish society to a young boy who lost his father to cancer.

The book's editor was Jordan Ferguson from Glounthaune, County Cork. According to the book, in March 2008, he was diagnosed with terminal cancer and told he had only months to live. He had one 9-year-old son, Sebastian. Ferguson then decided to gather together letters from "successful" Irish people. This project ended up becoming the book Dear Sebastian. Ferguson died before completing the book, but he asked his mother, Christine Horgan, to finish the project.

The letters which make up the book came from well-known Irish names, including:

- Politician Brian Cowen
- Businessman Tony O'Reilly
- Irish folk singer, songwriter, and guitarist Christy Moore
- Columnist John Waters
- Television and radio presenter Pat Kenny
- Rugby players Brian O'Driscoll and Ronan O'Gara
- Businessman, barrister, and politician Peter Sutherland
- Business magnate John Magnier
- Politician and 18th Tánaiste Mary Harney
- Singer Daniel O'Donnell
- Professional golfer Christy O'Connor Jnr
- Comedian and television personality Patrick Kielty
- Businessman JP McManus
- Gaelic footballer Seán Óg Ó hAilpín
- Businessman Michael Smurfit
- Television presenter and author Eddie Hobbs
- Irish association football player Shay Given
- Chef and television personality Darina Allen
- Television and radio presenter Gay Byrne
- Businessman and financier Dermot Desmond
