= The Ian Dempsey Breakfast Show =

Irish breakfast radio show

- Genre: Chat / music
- Running time: 06:00 – 09:00
- Country of origin: Ireland
- Language: English
- Home station: Today FM
- Recording studio: Marconi House, Digges Lane, Dublin 2
- Original release: September 1998 – present
- Audio format: FM and Digital radio
- Website: TodayFM.com page
- Podcast: TodayFM.com podcast

The Ian Dempsey Breakfast Show is an Irish breakfast radio show broadcast on weekday mornings from 06:00 – 09:00 on Today FM. Presented by Ian Dempsey, it is noted for its Gift Grub feature, performed by Mario Rosenstock. It is the tenth most popular radio programme in Ireland and was named best breakfast programme at the 2007 PPI Radio Awards.

Dempsey won a Meteor Award for Best Radio DJ at the 2003 Meteor Awards and has been nominated on a regular basis ever since, most recently in 2008. The show has also had a number of producers including Adelle McDonnell and Alison Curtis, who resigned from the post after being given her own weekday radio show on the station in 2008.

Another notable former producer of the show is Paul McLoone, a fellow Today FM radio presenter and current frontman of the Northern Irish pop-punk band, The Undertones and who also helped co-create the highly popular and successful comedy series, Gift Grub alongside Rosenstock.

In 2023, The Ian Dempsey Breakfast Show's listenership figures were 225,000, making it the station's 2nd biggest show after Dermot and Dave, and the 13th most listened to show in the country.

== History ==
The Ian Dempsey Breakfast Show has been on air since September 1998 and originally broadcast until 10:00 but an extra hour was given to The Ray D'Arcy Show in 2004 to allow direct competition with RTÉ 2fm rival Gerry Ryan. Each year for that time period, i.e. ten years, Dempsey and the breakfast crew have gone skiing. In 2007, the show replaced Eamon Dunphy's RTÉ Radio 1 Sunday morning programme as the 10th most listened to programme in Ireland. Lucy Kennedy presented the show when Dempsey was absent on 18 July 2008.

In 2011, Sinéad O'Connor announced her fourth marriage live on the show.

== Features ==
Gift Grub airs at approximately 07:10 and 08:10 every morning, as well as game "Waffle" after the 07:30 headlines, where a caller attempts to mention (hence, "Waffle") five 'key words' about a chosen topic with no advance notice of the topic in 30 seconds, for a cash prize of €1,000.

Showbiz news with Shauna O'Reilly occurs at approximately 07:45, as well as the news headlines, sport, traffic, and weather at the top and bottom of each hour.

The 'Kickstart Song' is played after the 07:00 headlines, where a caller suggests and introduces a (usually) energetic or upbeat song to start the day, with the catchphrase "Hit that button Iano" repeated by the caller as the song starts. Callers are rewarded with show merchandise, such as a bowl or bag.

Former features included "Talking Heads" where a number of voices played in quick sequence - listeners are allowed to guess the voices to win a cash prize; and "Free For All Friday" occurred each Friday when the listeners may request which songs are played on the show.
