= José and his Amazing Technicolor Overcoat =

Single by Mario Rosenstock

Single by Mario Rosenstock

from the album Gift Grub 6: The Special One
- Released: 20 February 2006
- Recorded: Today FM, Abbey Street, Dublin, Ireland
- Genre: Novelty
- Label: Angel

Mario Rosenstock singles chronology
"Leave Right Now"	"José and his Amazing Technicolor Overcoat"

"José and his Amazing Technicolor Overcoat" is a comedy sketch first performed for Gift Grub on Ireland's Today FM.

== Song ==
The skit parodies the musical Joseph and the Amazing Technicolor Dreamcoat (particularly the song "Any Dream Will Do", sung here as "Any Team Will Do") as well as then Chelsea manager José Mourinho. It received media attention in the UK by becoming popular on online message boards and London's Capital Gold radio. Mourinho himself said he liked the skit and invited Irish impersonator Mario Rosenstock to a player's dinner to perform it. It reached #45 in the UK Singles Chart.

== Follow-up ==
The song was followed up by I Sign a Little Player or Two. The sketch begins with a mock interview on Sky Sports involving José Mourinho and fellow football manager, Mick McCarthy. After playing up to Mourinho's perceived "Special One" image, Mourinho concludes the interview and starts singing. Unlike the original song, this was not released as a single. YouTube has received over 1 million views of the 3 Mourinho mock songs.
