= Wayne's World (disambiguation) =

Wayne's World was a popular recurring sketch in the television series Saturday Night Live

Wayne's World might also refer to:

== Wayne's World franchise ==
- Wayne's World (film), a film based on the sketch
  - Wayne's World (soundtrack), the original soundtrack from the movie
- Wayne's World 2, the film's sequel
  - Wayne's World 2 (soundtrack), the original soundtrack from the 2nd movie
- Wayne's World (video game), a video game based on the SNL sketch

== Television episodes ==
- "Wayne's World", an episode in the TV series Shark
  - "Wayne's World 2: Revenge of the Shark", an episode in the TV series Shark that continues the storyline of the first

== Other uses ==
- "Wayne's World", a song by Lil Wayne from the 2020 album Funeral

== See also ==
- Wayne's Word, a recurring segment of I'm on Setanta Sports
