= List of Irish Singles Chart Christmas number ones =

In Ireland, Christmas number ones are singles that are top of the Irish Singles Chart in the week in which Christmas Day falls.

The Irish Singles Chart was first published in 1962, and the first artist to top the chart at Christmas was Elvis Presley with "Return to Sender". The following year, Brendan Bowyer became the first Irish artist to claim top spot at Christmas with "No More".

The supergroup Band Aid, created by Irishman Bob Geldof, is the only act to have been number one at Christmas three times, each time with "Do They Know It's Christmas?". Four more acts have held top spot twice: The Beatles, Queen (both times with "Bohemian Rhapsody"), the Spice Girls and Eminem. Many acts that have topped the Irish Singles Chart at Christmas have also topped the UK Singles Chart at the same time.

From 2006 to 2013, every winner of the Irish Christmas number one came from the winning contestant of that year's series of the British reality contest The X Factor. Mark Ronson and Bruno Mars broke this streak in 2014 with their single "Uptown Funk". Irish bands such as The Rubberbandits ("Horse Outside" in 2010) and The Saw Doctors ("Downtown" in 2011) contested for the honor during this time frame, though all efforts fell short until 2020 winner Dermot Kennedy ("Giants") became the first Irish national to achieve the feat since Mario Rosenstock in 2005. The most recent Christmas number one on the Irish charts is "Killeagh" by Irish folk band Kingfishr.

== List ==
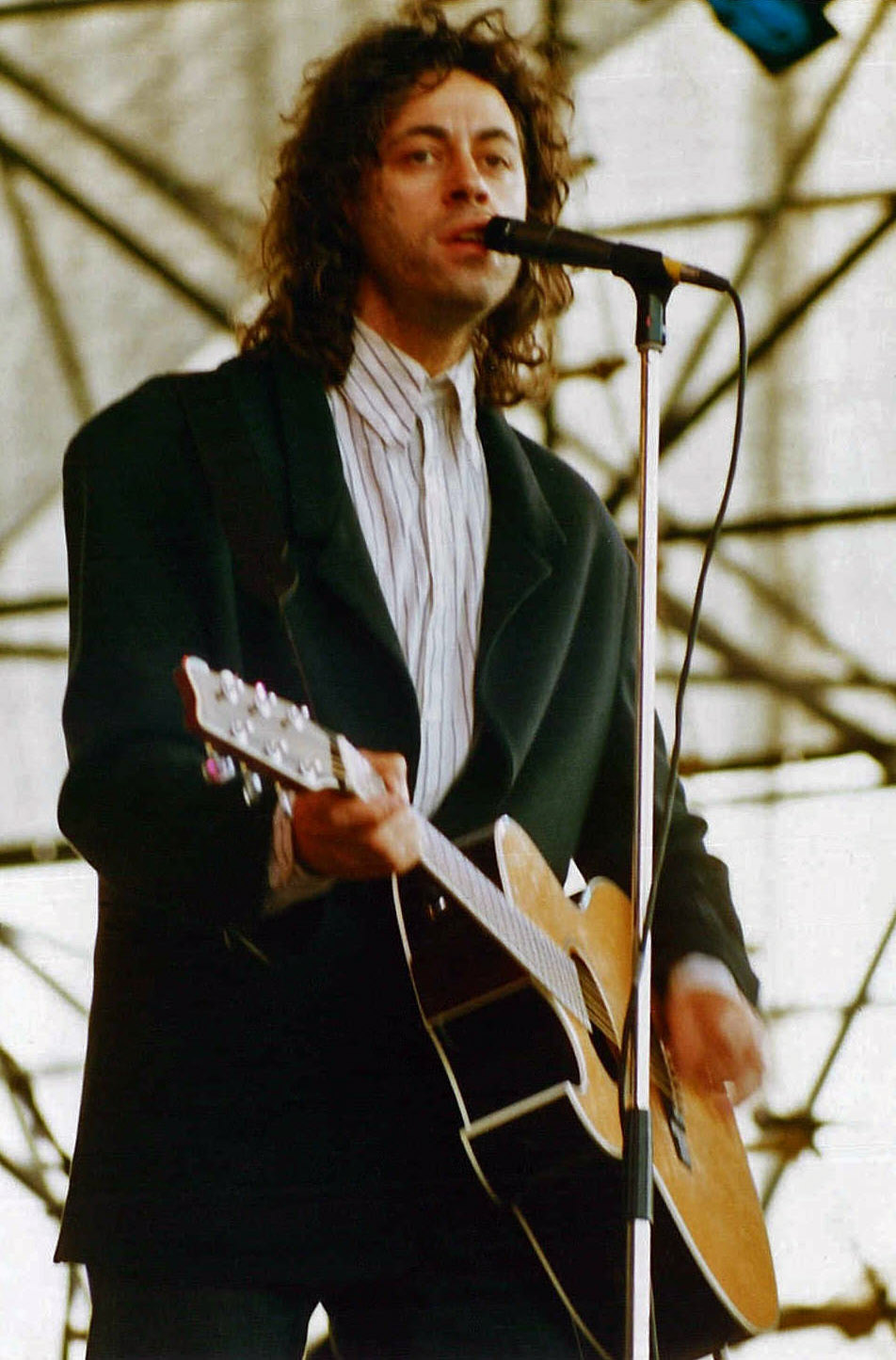
Irishman Bob Geldof was creator of supergroup Band Aid, who held the number one spot at Christmas in three different incarnations.

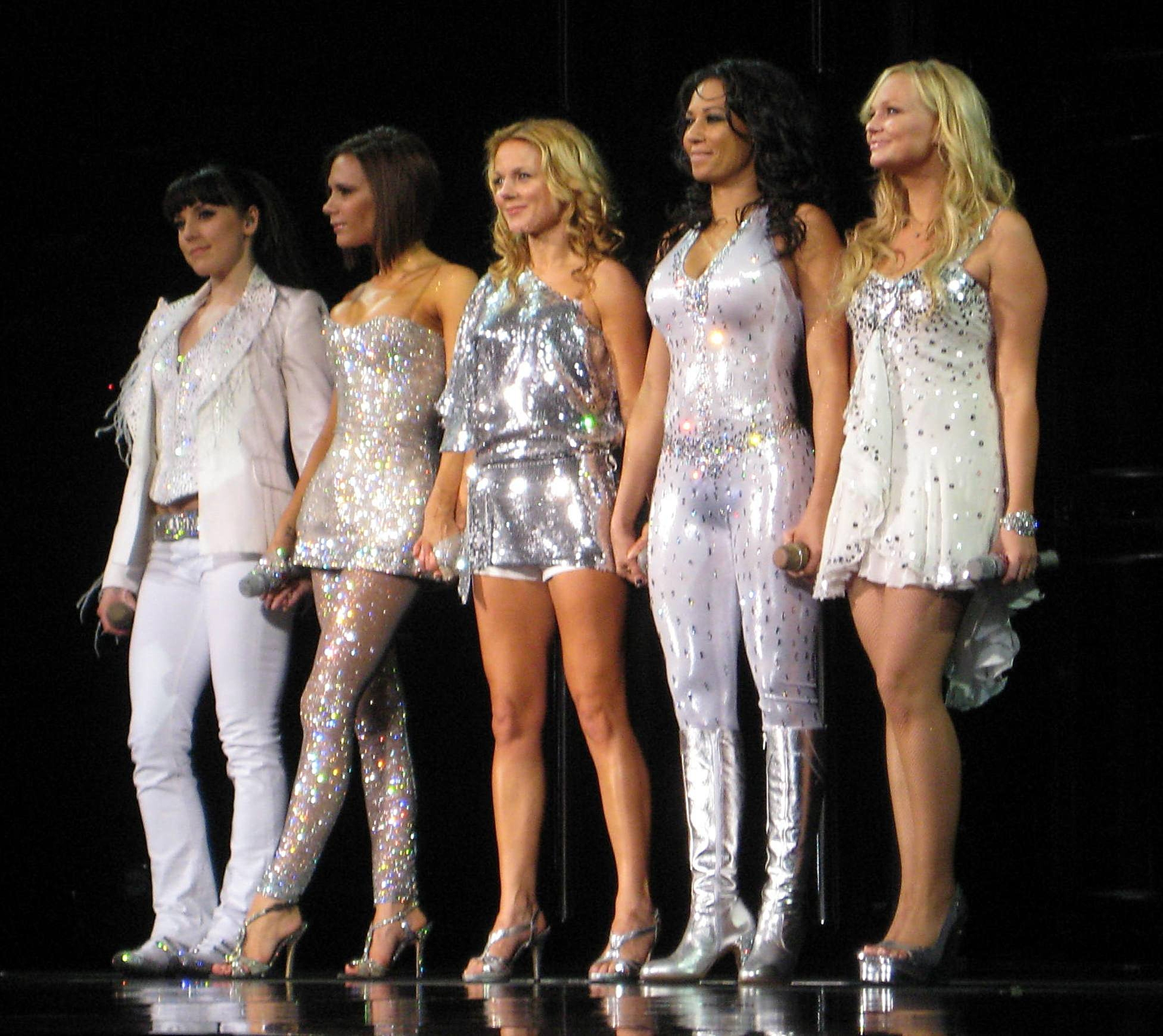
The Spice Girls held the number one spot at Christmas twice in the late 1990s.

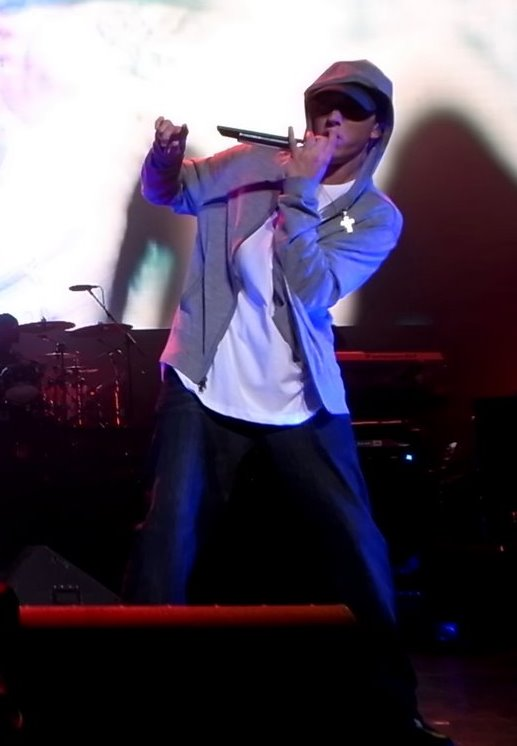
Eminem had two Christmas number ones in the early 2000s.

The X Factor (creator and judge Simon Cowell pictured) launched eight consecutive Irish Christmas number ones.

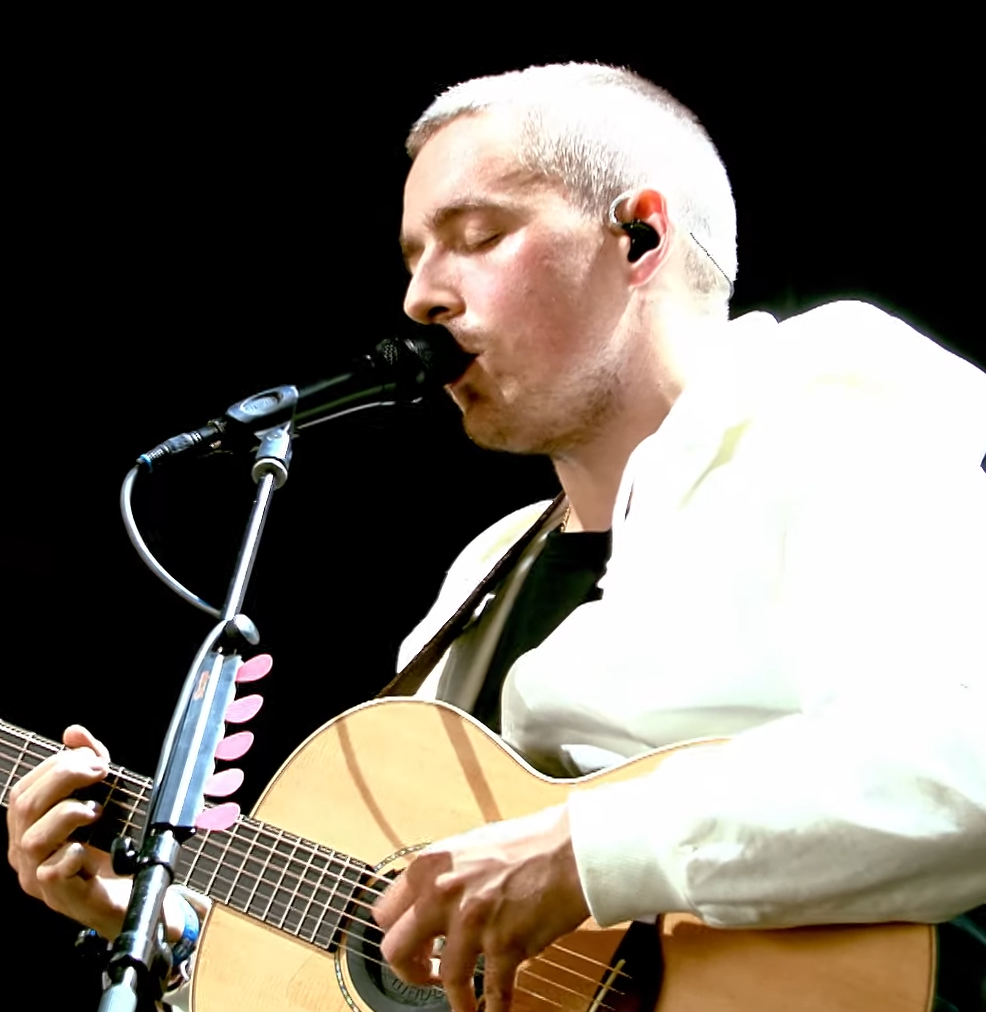
Dermot Kennedy, who held Number One in 2020, was the first Irishman to score Christmas number one since Mario Rosenstock in 2005.

Year	Artist	Song
1962	Elvis Presley	"Return to Sender"
1963	Brendan Bowyer	"No More"
1964	The Beatles	"I Feel Fine"
1965	The Beatles	"Day Tripper" / "We Can Work It Out"
1966	Tom Jones	"Green, Green Grass of Home"
1967	Pat Lynch	"Treat My Daughter Kindly"
1968	The Scaffold	"Lily The Pink"
1969	The Archies	"Sugar, Sugar"
1970	Dave Edmunds	"I Hear You Knocking"
1971	Tommy Drennan	"O Holy Night"
1972	Thin Lizzy	"Whiskey in the Jar"
1973	Slade	"Merry Christmas Everybody"
1974	Gary Glitter	"Oh Yes! You're Beautiful"
1975	Queen	"Bohemian Rhapsody"
1976	Chicago	"If You Leave Me Now"
1977	Wings	"Mull of Kintyre"
1978	Boney M	"Mary's Boy Child - Oh My Lord"
1979	Pink Floyd	"Another Brick in the Wall (Part 2)"
1980	St Winifred's School Choir	"There's No-one Quite Like Grandma"
1981	ABBA	"One of Us"
1982	Renee and Renato	"Save Your Love"
1983	Flying Pickets	"Only You"
1984	Band Aid	"Do They Know It's Christmas?"
1985	Dermot Morgan	"Thank You Very Much Mr. Eastwood"
1986	The Housemartins	"Caravan of Love"
1987	The Pogues ft. Kirsty MacColl	"Fairytale of New York"
1988	Cliff Richard	"Mistletoe and Wine"
1989	Band Aid	"Do They Know It's Christmas?"
1990	Zig and Zag	"The Christmas No.1"
1991	Queen	"Bohemian Rhapsody" / "These Are the Days of Our Lives"
1992	Whitney Houston	"I Will Always Love You"
1993	Take That	"Babe"
1994	East 17	"Stay Another Day"
1995	Boyzone	"Father and Son"
1996	Spice Girls	"2 Become 1"
1997	Various Artists	"Perfect Day"
1998	Spice Girls	"Goodbye"
1999	Westlife	"I Have a Dream"
2000	Eminem	"Stan"
2001	Kate Winslet	"What If"
2002	Eminem	"Lose Yourself"
2003	Will Young	"Leave Right Now"
2004	Band Aid 20	"Do They Know It's Christmas?"
2005	Mario Rosenstock	"Gift Grub/Leave Right Now"
2006	Leona Lewis	"A Moment Like This"
2007	Leon Jackson	"When You Believe"
2008	Alexandra Burke	"Hallelujah"
2009	Joe McElderry	"The Climb"
2010	Matt Cardle	"When We Collide"
2011	Little Mix	"Cannonball"
2012	James Arthur	"Impossible"
2013	Sam Bailey	"Skyscraper"
2014	Mark Ronson ft. Bruno Mars	"Uptown Funk"
2015	Justin Bieber	"Love Yourself"
2016	Clean Bandit ft. Sean Paul and Anne-Marie	"Rockabye"
2017	Ed Sheeran	"Perfect"
2018	Ava Max	"Sweet but Psycho"
2019	Lewis Capaldi	"Before You Go"
2020	Dermot Kennedy	"Giants"
2021	Ed Sheeran and Elton John	"Merry Christmas"
2022	Raye ft. 070 Shake	"Escapism"
2023	Noah Kahan	"Stick Season"
2024	Gracie Abrams	"That's So True"
2025	Kingfishr	"Killeagh"

== See also ==
- List of UK Singles Chart Christmas number ones
- List of UK Singles Chart Christmas number twos
