= Special 1 TV =

Satirical football television programme

- Also known as: I'm on Setanta Sports
- Genre: Comedy, Association football (soccer)
- Created by: Mario Rosenstock
- Written by: Mario Rosenstock
- Directed by: Damian Farrell
- Voices of: Mario Rosenstock; Keith Burke
- Country of origin: Ireland
- Original language: English
- No. of episodes: 71 episodes, 20 webisodes and 4 specials

Production
- Executive producer: Tony Whelan
- Producers: Damian Farrell, Mario Rosenstock
- Production locations: Dublin, Ireland
- Cinematography: Joe Edwards
- Editor: Dan Gannon
- Running time: 5-6 mins
- Production companies: Blue Elf Productions and Caboom Productions

Original release
- Network: Setanta Sports 1 BBC Three (2010 World Cup)
- Release: 11 June 2010 – 21 May 2011

Special 1 TV (formerly known as I'm on Setanta Sports) is a satirical football television programme, produced by Blue Elf Productions and Caboom Entertainment.

The stars of the show are puppet caricatures of various football personalities: namely José Mourinho, Sven-Göran Eriksson, Wayne Rooney, Fabio Capello and Arsène Wenger. All of the characters on the programme are voiced by Irish actor, comedian and impressionist Mario Rosenstock.

Typical episodes are recorded on the day before transmission in Dublin and run for up to six minutes length. Nearly all episodes appear in full on YouTube.

== History ==
The show was originally known as I'm on Setanta Sports (a parody of rival Sky Sports' You're on Sky Sports phone-in programme), and featured heavy Setanta Sports branding. The final episode under the IOSS format was aired on 10 January following Setanta's live coverage of Stoke City v Liverpool.

On 17 January 2009, however, a special transition episode aired, with various characters begging the José puppet to reverse his decision to quit the show. At the end of this special, the name on the office door was changed to "Special 1 TV", confirming rumours that the programme would soon be rebranded.

The show began airing under the title Special 1 TV from 31 January 2009, with changes consisting of a new title sequence and graphics (removing, in the process, all visual mentions of "Setanta Sports", other than the copyright line in the end credits, and replacing the channel's trademark yellow and black colour scheme with a predominantly green one). That the show had not otherwise changed was itself commented on during the programme, with the Wayne puppet calling it a "ruse".

On 20 August 2009, it was reported that no new regular episodes would be produced after Setanta's UK operations ceased trading on 23 June 2009.

The show returned on 11 June 2010 for a special six-part series on BBC Three to tie in with the 2010 World Cup, along with web-only sketches. The new series was also made available to watch on the BBC Three website and on BBC Comedy's YouTube channel. Audio from the series also aired during the breakfast show on Irish radio station Today FM.

A 17-part second series, to coincide with the Premier League season, began on BBC Three on Saturday 16 October 2010 and broadcasts on a fortnightly basis. The episodes were also published online in a blog on the BBC Sport website. The last of the 2010/11 episodes ("All in") in May 2011 ended with Jose declaring that the show "would not come back unless Manchester United could beat Barcelona in the Champions League final". Barcelona won the game 3-1 and as of March 2012 the show has not returned on the BBC or any other channel.

On 3 May, Special 1 TV returned as a segment on Betfair's YouTube channel. Four episodes have been released to date and it has been reported that a season has been signed to be produced with Betfair.

== Characters ==
=== José ===
AKA "The Special One". Self-assured and arrogant, he is the anchor of the "news programme" who reads viewer emails, takes phone calls on the air, and introduces video segments. José, who referred himself as the "Special One", often hypes himself up using phrases like "I'm fantastic." He is also particularly blunt, and often tells participants to "shut up." The show always ends with the line, usually spoken by José, "Be champions." He is also the main catalyst for most of the arguments on the show.

=== Sven ===
AKA "It". Introduced midway through the first season, Sven is José's sidekick and foil. Sven does whatever José tells him to do, no matter how humiliating. In various episodes, Sven is dressed up as the main butt of jokes. As in real life, he is seen trying to tout for any mention of manager work. At the beginning of Season two, Sven, who in real life had signed for Mexico, was seen dressed in colorful Mexican garb, with a colorful piñata llama and sombrero which was regular until he was sacked. He is also known for trying to announce his intention for applying for any managerial job at the time, even when he was manager of Côte d'Ivoire. José takes offense to this, lambasting Sven for pimping himself out. In a parody of the Richard Keys and Andy Gray sexism saga, Sven was dismissed from the show for not knowing the offside rule in Episode 11 of the 2010–11 series. Sven's interactions with David Beckham often reveal Sven's deep affections for Beckham. Almost every sentence spoken by Sven starts with him saying "Uh well..."

He proceeds to set up his own internet radio show in opposition to Special 1 TV entitled Sven FM. The first show includes a phone-in segment dedicated to complaining about José's massive ego and sympathising with 'Geordie Dave'. Sven FM also had calls from Mick McCarthy, David Beckham, Ian Holloway, Roy Keane and Ban Ki-moon.

=== Wayne ===
AKA "The Boy". Introduced as Jose's second "signing" near the end of the first season. Wayne is childlike but incredibly talented in ventriloquism (with a puppet of Cristiano Ronaldo, known as "Puppet-Ronnie"), chess, vocabulary, blindfolded Rubik's Cube, keepy-uppies, singing the first line to "Ave Maria", and playing the violin amongst other things. Wayne is adored by The Special One, and his addition to the show overshadows the hapless Sven and leads to jealous outbursts. Wayne is frequently praised by the regular telephone caller "Alex from Manchester" (Sir Alex Ferguson). Wayne and José often enjoy mocking Liverpool F.C. on the show.

Unlike the other characters on the show, Wayne's voice is not an impersonation, but high-pitched and childish, and with an exaggerated Scouse accent. He uses many Scouse aphorisms, such as finishing sentences with the word "like" and loudly exclaiming "This is mint!" when excited.

=== Fabio ===
AKA "Cabbageman" or simply "Cabbage". Fabio Capello was a caller towards the end of the season in series one, calling to comment in his native Italian language. In season two, episode four was interrupted by an emergency press conference with Fabio announcing himself as the show's new director. He had previously been seen watching and calling the show from his living room. José was annoyed as he was to announce another new signing shortly afterwards, and Fabio might disrupt this plan. Fabio's role reflected the situation in real-life football regarding directors of football and the board disrupting the managerial role, despite the fact that he was introduced before the situations at Newcastle United and West Ham United became apparent. In episode 7, Fabio "punk'd" José, with the help of Sven, Wayne and Sir Alex. José proceeded to once again complain to 'Big Boss', stating he would put up with it no more. After the "Great Debate", it was decided by viewers of the show that José, and not Fabio, should keep their role on the show. However, Fabio was eventually reinstated into the programme.

In the 2010–11 series, Fabio introduced about the Twitter posts of famous Premiership players entitled "Footballers' Tweets". However, Jose became annoyed when Fabio read out messages posted by Rio Ferdinand calling the tweets 'stinking' and Fabio was fired by Jose.

=== Barack ===
In the final episode of the first Special 1 TV series, Barack Obama was announced as Jose's new signing for the start of next season. In his introductory address (his only on-screen appearance in the series), he commented on the fact that he is a fan of West Ham (the real life Obama has been a fan of the London club since a visit to England in 2003). Obama had previously featured on the first episode of Special 1 TV as a caller, when Sven had complained about the low calibre of callers on the show.

=== Wenger ===
Arsène Wenger became the fifth presenter of Special 1 TV during the final minutes of the episode on 4 March 2011, although not officially announced until 11 March. A former caller to the show (usually labelled as "Arsene from London"), Wenger is nicknamed "Voyeur" by José, due to his spying and intense interest in José's management of Chelsea F.C. He finds the show ridiculous and mostly calls to complain about bias and unsubstantiated items featured on the programme. He is regularly the main target for jokes in the show through either arguments with Alex (who once called him a "sorry string of misery") and José, or is ridiculed for his ways of calling the show by using free methods of ringing up (a mock on Arsene's tight transfer policy). After Sven, he is one of the most targeted characters for joking. In later episodes "Voyeur" often quotes movies after being provoked by José. However prior to becoming a presenter, José changed his attitude towards him. He is well known for speaking in aphorisms, many of which he uses as replies to José's questions.

=== FIFA ===
"FIFA" is never seen, but is represented by distracting spotlights and the sound effects of sirens, helicopters, and barking attack dogs. Whenever José commits a gross violation of one of their rules, they interrupt the show to announce themselves via a loudspeaker and inform José that they are about to arrest him. José always cuts them off by telling them to shut up, and the show resumes where it left off, except in the 27th episode, in the 2010–2011 series, when FIFA get him.

=== Other characters ===
There are also characters which have appeared partially, either with their face blurred or unable to see : Roberto Mancini, Peter Crouch, Avram Grant, Robbie Keane, Mick McCarthy.

=== Callers ===
Most episodes feature a "calls from the viewers" segment. Many callers make repeat appearances throughout the series.

- Dave from Newcastle/Stoke is a Geordie-accented caller obsessed with Shola Ameobi and ends up following him from Newcastle United to Stoke City. Almost all calls ended with José telling him to shut up. Dave was both the first-ever and last-ever caller on I'm On Setanta Sports before the rebranding to Special 1 TV.
- Alex from Manchester (Sir Alex Ferguson) usually dubbed "Mr. Alex" by José, chews gum on the air and refers to José as "pretty boy." Often phones to declare that some portion of the news is an "absolute disgrace" and when discussing Wayne says "that's the quality of the boy." He sides with José on many of the issues, sends him bottles of wine, and tells Wayne to come home immediately.
- Roy from Sunderland/Manchester/Ipswich/Home (Roy Keane) calls in from time to time to complain about rules being broken. Whenever he's paired with Alex from Manchester, he starts to beg for new players. Usually begins each call by giving "all credit" to a point raised by a previous caller.
- Rafa from Liverpool/Milan/England Camp (Rafael Benítez, voiced by Keith Burke) calls often, but hangs up when José or others mentioned his obesity. Jokes are often made regarding his overeating. When seen on screen, he always wears a Spider-Man costume. A voice resembling 'Stevie G's' often features in the background of calls, telling Rafa what to do and insulting him. During the 2010 World Cup, he became a (out-of-vision) roving reporter from inside the England camp (most likely to reflect him taking the managers' job at Inter Milan, ironically enough, replacing the real José Mourinho).
- David from Los Angeles / Milan (David Beckham) is a dimwitted friend of Sven whose lack of understanding of words often leads to awkward moments (for example, in one episode he thinks the Statue of David in Milan was a gift for him). Calls from David often feature Tom Cruise talking to David in the background.
- Ian from Blackpool (Ian Holloway) calls in with commentary from time to time, and there are always sheep bleating in the background.
- Mick from Wolverhampton (Mick McCarthy) usually expresses his astonishment with the phrase "flipping heck." Speaks with a particularly slow cadence, and has problems pronouncing names of many African footballers (particularly those from Nigeria).
- The management team of Blackburn Rovers F.C. tries to contribute to the show, but the only sound is frantic chickens clucking, a reference to the recent takeover of the club by Venky's (India) Limited, a chicken meat processing company.
- Roman from London (Roman Abramovich), a.k.a. "Big Boss", who regularly calls the show from his helicopter starting with the phrase "Why You Defy Me?" Most of his calls will be to tempt a caller or presenter about joining him at Chelsea, to which José starts to defend said person.

Other callers include Stevie G from Liverpool (Steven Gerrard), Mohamed from London (Mohamed Al Fayed), Frank (Frank Lampard), Claude (Claude Makélélé), usually-upset Didier (Didier Drogba), Michael (Michael Ballack) and JT (John Terry) from London, Joe from Newcastle (Joe Kinnear), Harry from London (Harry Redknapp), Dennis and Alan from Newcastle (Dennis Wise and Alan Shearer), Robbie from London/Liverpool (Robbie Keane), Roberto (Roberto Mancini), Vinny from Los Angeles (Vinnie Jones), William from London (William Gallas), Phil from London (Luis Felipe Scolari) a.k.a. "The Gene Hackman", Guus from London (Guus Hiddink) (a.k.a. "Potato"), Roy from Liverpool (Roy Hodgson), Peter from Cardiff (Peter Crouch).

Other non-football callers which have phoned in to the programme, besides Barack from Washington (Barack Obama), are: Nelson from South Africa (Nelson Mandela), Willie from Texas (Willie Nelson), Tom from L.A./South Africa (Tom Cruise), Graham from London (Graham Norton), Simon from Barbados (Simon Cowell), Cheryl from Newcastle (Cheryl Tweedy), Liam and Noel from Manchester (Liam Gallagher and Noel Gallagher), Stephen from London (Stephen Fry) and Mick from South Africa (Mick Jagger).

== Recurring segments ==
- The News - José reports the news around the football world, introducing the segment by saying only "The news!" Often includes José's 'My Top Story', reflecting on the main football story of the week. The first episode of Season two included José reporting on the weather and showing sunny weather in Italy (the location of his new job) and thunderstorms in England in the locations of Liverpool, Manchester (Manchester United) and London (Arsenal). Often ended with José declaring, in a different way every time, that he is "fantastic" (e.g. he once sucked the helium out of a balloon before saying it in a distorted voice).
- Help Find A Home... - Wayne tries to find a job or team for an unemployed manager or player, in the vein of an adoption TV commercial.
- Wayne's Word - Wayne Rooney defines a difficult-to-pronounce footballing term. Named after the recurring sketch from Saturday Night Live, and a biography of Rooney with the same name. Introduced by Sven on guitar, wearing a bandanna (which has led to him being accused of pretending to be Willie Nelson)
- Sven's Wonderful World of Football - Sven is supposed to give his take on the football world, but things don't often go to plan. Ended one segment singing "It's Not Unusual" to British troops serving in Afghanistan and refused to present another segment while mad at José. This segment appears only sporadically.
- Thought of the Day - A short commentary on the state of football by José at the end of the show. Occurred only in the earliest episodes.
- Syndication of Special 1 TV - A short episode of Special 1 TV from another country, sometimes in different languages, from America, Italy, Germany and Sweden.
- Footballer's Tweets - A brief segment in the current season whereby temporary signing Fabio 'Cabbageman' Capello read out tweets from Premier League footballers. José is unimpressed with Fabio's feeble attempts at choosing humorous tweets to read out and subsequently sacks him Alan Sugar style to be replaced by Arsène Wenger. The segment is then dropped from the show.

== Episodes ==
=== I'm on Setanta Sports ===
Season 1

1. José Is Back!
2. José Starts His New Job
3. José On Capello
4. José's Christmas Speech
5. Happy New Year
6. José - I'm Fantastic!
7. José On Keegan's Return
8. José On New Signing
9. José Pulls Off Signing Coup
10. Sven And The Special One's TV Debut
11. Exclusive Interview With Rafa
12. Sven And Becks Reunited
13. Sven Visits Afghanistan
14. José Gives Sven A Special Costume
15. The Special Ones New Signing... Revealed!
16. Wayne Rooney Is Gifted
17. Arsene And José Clash
18. José Gives His Take On Avram Grant
19. José's Got Talent
20. José On Sven's Future
21. José Sings Adieu To Sven

Season 2

1. The Special One Is Back!
2. José On Big Money Transfers
3. José And Sven Play A Gameshow
4. José In The Battle For Berba
5. José Is Going Nowhere!
6. José Lifts The Lid on What's Going on at Newcastle
7. José Has To Deal with a Late Injury Pull-out To Wayne
8. José Makes A Shock Revelation
9. José And Fabio - The Great Debate
10. José And Sven Host A Ghoulish Party
11. The Voyeur Implodes
12. José Accuses The Voyeur of Spying
13. José On Those Injured England Players
14. José On That Meeting With Drogba
15. Roy Keane Exclusive!
16. José Interviews Rafa About The Game
17. José On The Champions League Draw
18. José's Special Christmas Message
19. Setanta Sports Manager of the Year
20. José quits Setanta Post (aka The Finale)

Specials

These episodes debuted during Setanta's coverage of the England team and their rivals in the World Cup 2010 qualifying group.

1. When Wayne Met Fabio, Part 1
2. When Wayne Met Fabio, Part 2

=== Special 1 TV ===
1. Special 1 TV is here!
2. José gives his take on the transfer window
3. Tom Cruise calls the show!
4. Och Heil José! Special 1 TV in German...
5. José Phones It In
6. Introducing "The Potato"
7. Wayne Nurses The Ronnie Puppet
8. Cabbageman Gets His Lapdance
9. Managers on Unemployment
10. Roy is Back in Town
11. Swine Flu
12. Wormhole/Champions League
13. Wayne's Eurovision & Puppet Ronnie's Workout
14. Getting Ready For Next Season And Obama Joins The Show
15. Best of Special 1 TV 2008–09

=== World Cup Series ===
1. Special 1 TV Returns.... in South Africa!
2. Tomorrow, Algeria
3. Algerian Aftermath
4. Next, the Germans
5. What Next?
6. Finally, The Final

==== Webisodes ====
- 1.1 Wayne vs Wayne
- 1.2 Sven Sting
- 1.3 Moments
- 1.4 Wayne's Anger Management
- 2.1 A Crime!
- 2.2 Wayne's Word: Vuvuzela
- 2.3 Sven on England
- 3.1 Another Side to Fabio
- 3.2 Callers, Hello?
- 3.3 Least Favourite TV Characters
- 4.1 Wayne's Africa
- 4.2 Fabio Goes Gaga
- 4.3 Thousands of Joses
- 4.4 Roy on England and Other Things
- 4.5 Ronnie & Rooney
- 5.1 New Manager for England?
- 5.2 A Special Appeal
- 5.3 Special Tears
- 5.4 World Cup Cooks
- 5.5 Baby Talk

=== Series 2 (Premier League Season 2010/2011) ===
1. The One About Liverpool
2. The Thing
3. Wayne's Radical Treatment
4. Under Pressure
5. The Future
6. The Truth
7. The Leaking
8. Christmas Special
9. Mid-table Madness
10. King Kenny Exclusive
11. Arry's Bargain Bin
12. Sven Sacked
13. The Deadline Day Aftermath
14. Just Like That
15. Act of God
16. Nine Special Years
17. Two Becomes Three
18. An Audience with Wenger
19. Champions League Special
20. Wenger in Wales
21. Sven FM
22. Wayne Banned
23. Through The Keyhole
24. Wayne's Redemption
25. Match of the Century
26. Conspiracy at the Nou Camp
27. Pariah
28. All in
