= Confessions on a Dance Floor =

2005 studio album by Madonna

Studio album by Madonna
- Released: November 9, 2005
- Recorded: November 2004 – June 2005
- Studios: Mayfair Studios, Stuart Price's home (London); Murlyn Studios (Stockholm)
- Genres: Dance-pop; nu-disco; EDM
- Length: 56:28
- Label: Warner Bros.
- Producers: Madonna; Stuart Price; Mirwais Ahmadzaï; Bloodshy & Avant

Madonna chronology
Remixed & Revisited (2003)	Confessions on a Dance Floor (2005)	I'm Going to Tell You a Secret (2006)

Singles from Confessions on a Dance Floor
- 1. "Hung Up" Released: October 17, 2005; 2. "Sorry" Released: February 6, 2006; 3. "Get Together" Released: May 30, 2006; 4. "Jump" Released: September 11, 2006

Confessions on a Dance Floor is the tenth studio album by American singer and songwriter Madonna. It was released on November 9, 2005, by Warner Bros. Records. A departure from her previous studio album American Life (2003), the album incorporates influences from 1970s disco, 1980s electropop, and 2000s club music. Madonna initially worked with Mirwais Ahmadzaï but later felt that their collaboration was not moving in the direction she wanted. She then began collaborating with Stuart Price, who was overseeing her documentary I'm Going to Tell You a Secret. The album was recorded mainly at Price's home studio, where Madonna spent much of the recording period.

Musically, the record is structured like a DJ set. The songs are sequenced and blended to play continuously without gaps. The title reflects the album's track listing, which begins with lighthearted, upbeat songs and progresses to darker melodies and lyrics about personal feelings and commitments. Songs on the album sample and reference music by other dance-oriented artists, including ABBA, Donna Summer, Pet Shop Boys, the Bee Gees, and Depeche Mode, as well as Madonna's own 1980s output. Madonna promoted the album through several live performances and a promotional tour. She embarked on the Confessions Tour in 2006, which became the highest-grossing tour ever for a female artist at that time.

Four singles were released from the album. "Hung Up", the lead single, topped the charts in a total of 41 countries. According to Billboard, it was the most successful dance song of the decade. It was followed by "Sorry", which became Madonna's twelfth number-one single in the United Kingdom. "Get Together" and "Jump" were also released as singles, both becoming top-ten hits in several countries. Commercially, Confessions on a Dance Floor peaked at number one in 40 countries, earning a place in the 2007 Guinness World Records for topping the record charts in the most countries. Selling more than 3.6 million copies worldwide in its first week, Confessions on a Dance Floor became one of the best-selling albums of the 21st century, with over 10 million copies sold globally.

The album received widespread acclaim, with critics calling it a return to form for Madonna and ranking it alongside her best albums. Madonna was honored with a Grammy Award for Best Electronic/Dance Album in 2007. The album has been described as a testament to Madonna's longevity and her ability to reinvent herself during the third decade of her career. In November 2025, Madonna released a Twenty Years Edition on digital retailers, including bonus tracks and contemporary remixes. A sequel album, Confessions II, was released to similar widespread critical acclaim on July 3, 2026.

== Background and development ==
Confessions on a Dance Floor merged elements from 1970s disco, 1980s electropop and 2000s club music. Madonna decided to incorporate disco-influenced elements into the songs while avoiding a remake of her earlier music, instead paying tribute to artists such as the Bee Gees and Giorgio Moroder. The songs reflected Madonna's thoughts on love, fame, and religion, which inspired the title Confessions on a Dance Floor. It took the opposite direction from her previous studio album American Life (2003). The songs on that album were a form of diatribe directed at American society. However, Madonna decided to take a different direction with this album. Regarding the development, Madonna commented:

"When I wrote American Life, I was very agitated by what was going on in the world around me, [...] I was angry. I had a lot to get off my chest. I made a lot of political statements. But now, I feel that I just want to have fun; I want to dance; I want to feel buoyant. And I want to give other people the same feeling. There's a lot of madness in the world around us, and I want people to be happy."

She started to work with Mirwais Ahmadzaï with whom she had previously developed her eighth album Music (2000). However, that collaboration did not suit Madonna's musical direction. According to Madonna, "[Producer] Mirwais is also very political, seriously cerebral and intellectual. All we did was sit around, talking politics all the time. So, that couldn't help but find its way into the music. I think there's an angry aspect to the music that directly reflects my feelings at the time." After recording tracks with Mirwais, Madonna decided to stop the project and start fresh. She then turned to Stuart Price, who had served as musical director on her two previous concert tours and co-wrote one song on American Life.

In 2004, after the release of American Life, Madonna began working on two different musicals: one tentatively called Hello Suckers and another with Luc Besson, who had previously directed the music video for her single "Love Profusion", that would portray her as a woman on her deathbed looking back on her life. Madonna collaborated with Patrick Leonard, Ahmadzaï and Price to write new songs, with Price assigned to write disco-influenced songs that sounded like "ABBA on drugs". However, Madonna found herself dissatisfied with the script written by Besson and scrapped it. Madonna and Price then decided to use the compositions for the album instead. According to Madonna, it was easy for her to move away from the sentiments of her previous album, since she included those political views in her documentary I'm Going to Tell You a Secret. She elaborated:

I was running back and forth, literally, from the editing room with [the documentary's director] Jonas Akerlund to working with Stuart, who was also mixing the music in the film. We were together, non-stop, all of us. Cutting 350 hours of film down to two hours. There are a lot of serious aspects to the movie. I needed a release. When I would go to Stuart's, and we'd go up to his loft, it was like, 'Honey, I want to dance.' I wanted to be happy, silly and buoyant. I wanted to lift myself and others up with this record. So, yes, the new album was a reaction to all the other stuff I was doing, which was very serious in nature. I hope that doesn't imply that I wanted to make a superficial record, because it's not. I want people to smile when they hear this record. I wanted it to put a smile on my face, too.

== Recording ==
"We spent five or six weeks in my apartment; the studio used to be upstairs in the loft. I would work on a track overnight, then she would come in and we'd start messing around. She would do vocal melodies and I would come up with a few ideas, and then she'd go, 'Okay, I'm gonna go home and think about it.' Then she'd come back the next day and have the hook for "Hung Up" or the chorus for "Sorry". Then I would carry on working on more tracks to keep us going. It was more of a really fluid and almost childlike environment than anything that seemed too serious."

— Stuart Price on collaborating with Madonna.

The first three songs written for the album were "Hung Up", "Sorry" and "Future Lovers". In an interview with Billboard, Madonna described the recording process as a give-and-take situation. According to her, Price used to stay up all night working on the songs. This was helped by his experience as a DJ, which made him accustomed to staying awake all night. This gave Madonna the chance to work on other aspects of the compositions. She noted that she and Price had opposite characteristics, which helped in their collaboration. The songs were mainly recorded at Price's home. Madonna said:

We did a lot of recording at his house. I'd come by in the morning and Stuart would answer the door in his stocking feet – as he'd been up all night. I'd bring him a cup of coffee and say, 'Stuart, your house is a mess, there's no food in the cupboard.' Then I'd call someone from my house to bring food over for him. And then we'd work all day. We're very much the odd couple.

She further explained that their camaraderie also came from having toured together for Madonna's Re-Invention World Tour. Madonna said her relationship with Price was more like that of siblings than the formal collaborations she was accustomed to during the recording process.

== Composition ==
"Can't I love New York the best? There's enough room in my heart for other cities, and there's also a bit of irony in the song, you know. I actually wrote that while I was on tour and in New York, and I was loving the energy of being here and just feeling like I stuck my finger in an electric socket. I can't wait to do it live — I'm going to throw my hair around!"

— Madonna on the song "I Love New York"

Confessions on a Dance Floor is primarily a dance-pop, nu-disco, and EDM album structured like a nightly DJ set. The music starts light and happy, and as it progresses, it becomes intense, with the lyrics dealing more with personal feelings, hence "Confessions". According to Madonna, the album's title speaks to her reverence for the genre and her dedication to her craft. According to Madonna, "[t]his is the direction of my record. That's what we intended, to make a record that you can play at a party or in your car, where you don't have to skip past a ballad. It's nonstop." Madonna used samples and references of music by other disco artists. In the album's first song, "Hung Up", she sampled ABBA's 1979 hit "Gimme! Gimme! Gimme! (A Man After Midnight)", for which she wrote a personal letter to songwriters Benny Andersson and Björn Ulvaeus, who permitted Madonna to use the track. References to other disco-influenced acts, including Pet Shop Boys, Depeche Mode, and Daft Punk, were also used on the album, as were the disco hits of Parisian DJ Cerrone. The album has a song called "Forbidden Love", which is different from the same-titled song from Madonna's sixth studio album Bedtime Stories. Regarding sampling herself and her own song names, Madonna commented:

"I did all of that on purpose, [...] I mean, if I'm going to plagiarize somebody, it might as well be me, right? I feel like I've earned the right to rip myself off. 'Talent borrows, genius steals,' [...] "Let's see how many other clichés I can throw in there".

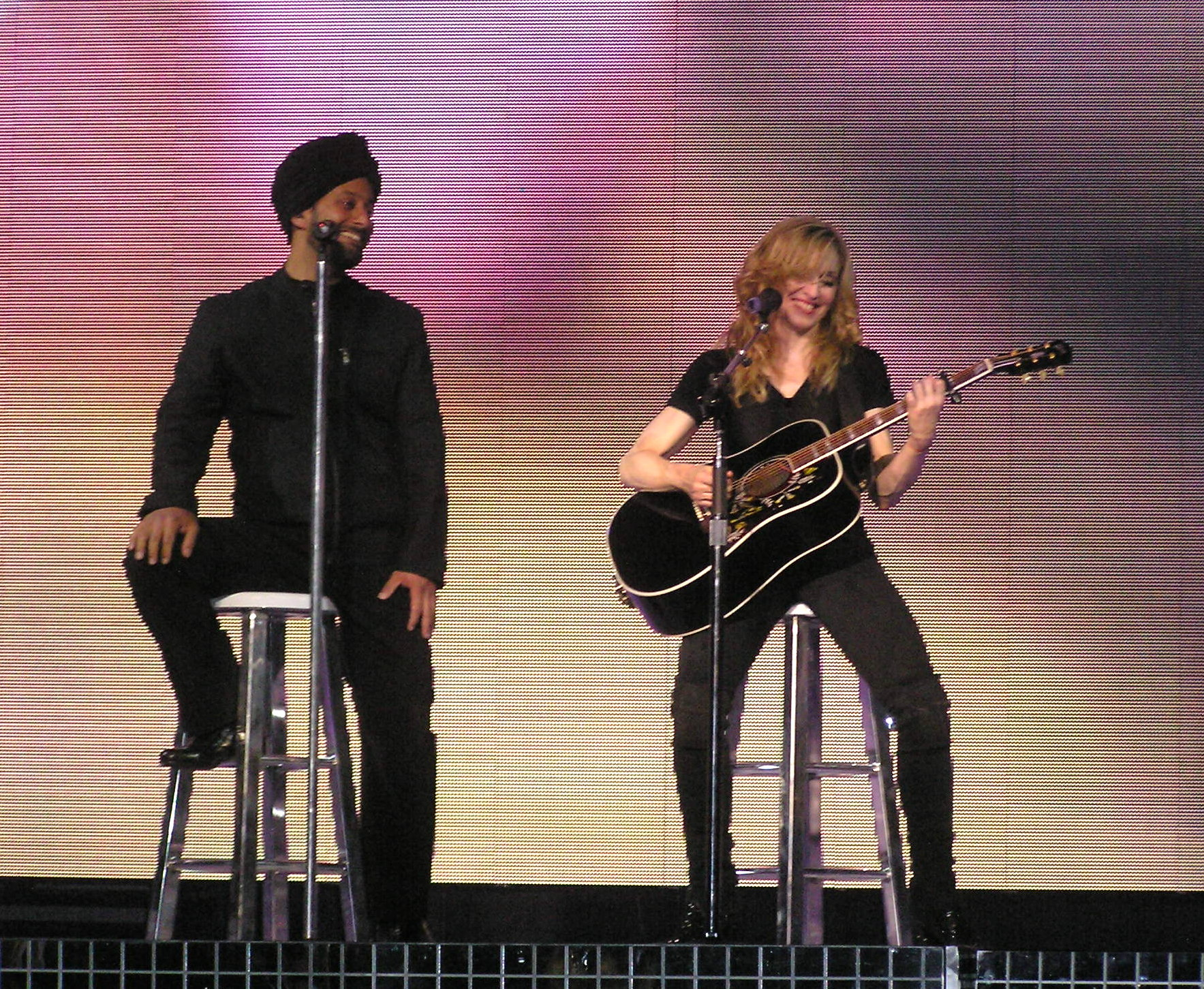
Singer Yitzhak Sinwani (left) contributed vocals to the song "Isaac". He also joined Madonna during some performances on the Confessions Tour.

A pulsating rhythm appears in "Isaac", which has been regarded as the album's only near-ballad. The song was heavily criticized by a group of Israeli rabbis who commented that Madonna was committing blasphemy against their religion. They said that the song was about 16th-century Kabbalah scholar Yitzhak Luria. In reality, the song was named after the featured vocalist Yitzhak Sinwani, who sang portions of the Yemenite Hebrew poem Im Nin'alu in the track, as well as references to the biblical story of Abraham and Isaac. Initially, Madonna considered the idea of calling the song "Fear of Flying", since the idea behind the composition was to let go. In the end, she decided to just call it "Isaac", after the English version of Sinwani's name. Regarding the song's development and the condemnation of the rabbis, Madonna said:

"You do appreciate the absurdity of a group of rabbis in Israel claiming that I'm being blasphemous about someone when they haven't heard the record, right? And then, everyone in the media runs with it as if it's the truth. And that's a little weird. But what's even weirder is that the song is not about Isaac Lurier [sic], as the rabbis claim. It's named after Yitzhak Sinwani, who's singing in Yemenite on the track. I couldn't think of a title for the song. So I called it "Isaac" [the English transliteration of "Yitzhak"]. It's interesting how their minds work, those naughty rabbis. [...] He's saying, "If all of the doors of all of the generous peoples' homes are closed to you, the gates of heaven will always be open." The words are about 1,000 years old. [...] [Yitzhak] is an old friend of mine. He's never made a record. He comes from generations of beautiful singers. Stuart and I asked him to come into the studio one day. We said, "We're just going to record you. We don't know what we're going to do with it." He's flawless. One take, no bad notes. He doesn't even need a microphone. We took one of the songs he did and I said to Stuart, "Let's sample these bits. We'll create a chorus and then I'll write lyrics around it." That's how we constructed it."

The lyrics of the songs on the album incorporate elements of Madonna's musical history and are written in the form of confessions. "Hung Up" contains lyrics from Madonna's 1989 duet with Prince called "Love Song", from the Like a Prayer album. "How High" continues the themes of two songs from Madonna's eighth studio album Music, namely "Nobody's Perfect" and "I Deserve It". The lyrics of "Push" thank the person who challenged her to push her limits and also incorporate elements of the Police's song "Every Breath You Take". Other tracks like "Sorry" include the title word in ten different languages (several of which are non-idiomatic). In "I Love New York" (written at the time of American Life), she praises the city where her career began and replies to negative comments made by then-president of the United States, George W. Bush. Elsewhere, Madonna sings about success and fame ("Let It Will Be") and the crossroads of past, present, and future ("Like It or Not").

== Promotion ==
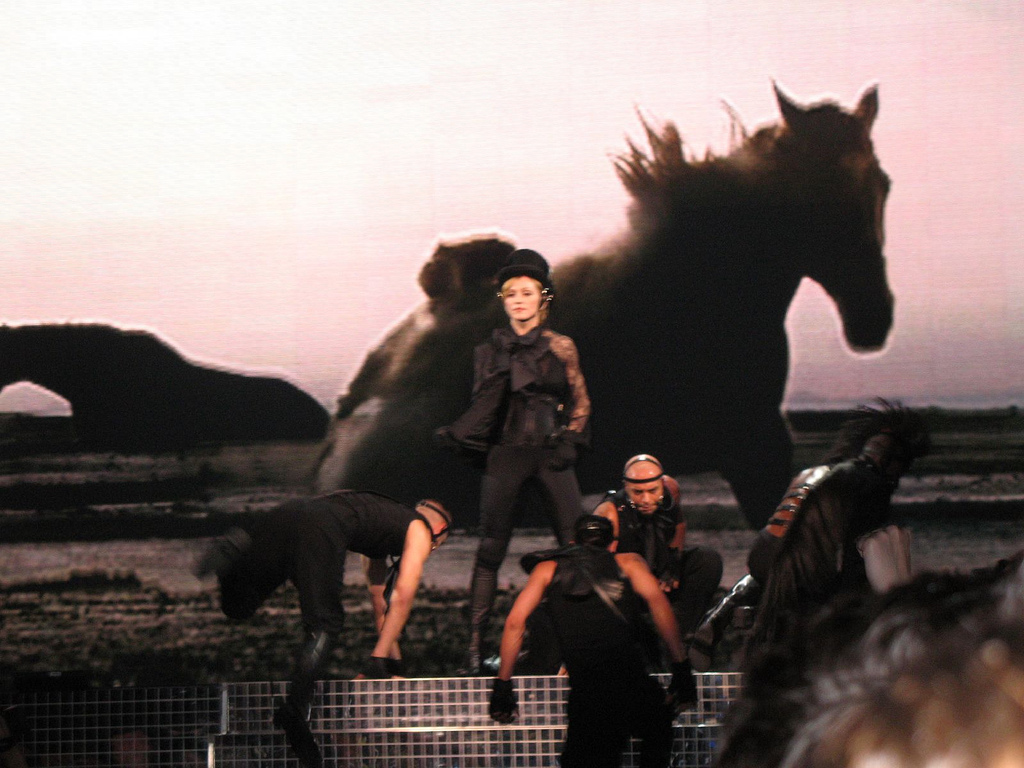
Madonna opening the Confessions Tour with a performance of "Future Lovers", the album's fourth track

On November 3, 2005, Madonna opened the 2005 MTV Europe Music Awards with her first performance of "Hung Up". She emerged from a glitter ball to perform the song, while wearing a purple leotard and matching leather boots. Over the next few days, Madonna performed "Hung Up" on TV shows such as Wetten, dass..? in Germany, and Star Academy in France, as well as on the Children in Need 2005 telethon in London. In order to promote the album's release, Madonna appeared on Parkinson. She played a number of songs from the album at London's Koko Club and G-A-Y as part of a promo tour to support the album.

In December, Madonna traveled to Japan, where "Hung Up" was performed on the TV show SMAP×SMAP and her concert at Studio Coast. On February 8, 2006, Madonna opened the 48th Grammy Awards, by pairing up with the fictional animated band Gorillaz. The band appeared onstage through a three-dimensional technique that projected their holograms. They performed their song "Feel Good Inc." while rappers De La Soul made a guest appearance. Madonna then appeared onstage and started performing the song while interchanging places with the hologram figures of the band. She was later joined by her own group of dancers and the performance ended on the main stage rather than the virtual screen. Another performance of "Hung Up" came on April 30, 2006 during the Coachella Valley Music and Arts Festival in Indio, California.

A remix-only album titled Confessions Remixed was also released in limited vinyl editions. In Japan, Confessions on a Dance Floor – Japan Tour Special Edition (CD+DVD) was released on August 23, 2006. It reached number 27 on the Oricon weekly albums chart and stayed on the chart for 12 weeks. The album received further promotion from the Confessions Tour which began in May 2006. The tour grossed over US$194.7 million, becoming the highest-grossing tour ever for a female artist, at that time. Additionally, the tour received the "Most Creative Stage Production" award at the Pollstar Concert Industry Awards, as well as "Top Boxscore" from the Billboard Touring Awards.

=== Singles ===
"Hung Up" was released as the album's lead single on October 17, 2005. The song received critical appreciation among reviewers, who suggested that the track would restore the singer's popularity, which had diminished following the release of her 2003 album American Life. Critics claimed that it was her best dance track to date and compared it to other Madonna tracks in the same genre. They also complimented the effective synchronization of the ABBA sample with Madonna's song. "Hung Up" became a worldwide commercial success, peaking atop the charts of 41 countries and earning a place in the Guinness Book of World Records along with the album. In the United States it became her 36th top-ten hit, tying her with Elvis Presley. The corresponding music video was a tribute to John Travolta, his movies and dancing in general. Directed by Johan Renck, the video featured Madonna dancing in a ballet studio in a pink leotard, which she left to go to a gaming parlor to dance with her backup dancers.

"Sorry" was released as the second single from the album on February 6, 2006. The song received positive reviews from contemporary critics who declared the track as the strongest song on Confessions on a Dance Floor. It achieved commercial success, topping the singles charts in Italy, Spain, Romania, and the United Kingdom, where it became Madonna's 12th number-one single. Elsewhere, the song was a top-ten hit in more than a dozen countries around the world. However, in the United States, the song was less commercially successful because of limited radio play, but managed to reach the top of Billboard's dance charts.

"Get Together" was released as the third single from the album by Warner Bros. Records on May 30, 2006. The decision was prompted by the fact that "Get Together" was the third most downloaded song from the album. It was also released to coincide with the start of Madonna's Confessions Tour. Critics complimented Madonna's ability to turn cliché comments into pop slogans with the song. The song became a success on the U.S. dance charts, but failed to enter the Hot 100. It reached the top ten in countries such as Australia, Canada, the United Kingdom, and Italy, and peaked at number one in Spain.

"Jump" was released as the fourth and final single from the album on September 11, 2006. The video had a modern Tokyo-inspired look and featured the physical discipline parkour. Critics complimented the song and its empowerment theme. The song peaked inside the top ten of the charts in some European countries, while reaching number one in Italy and Hungary. In the United States, "Jump" charted in several Billboard dance charts but failed to chart on the Hot 100.

== Critical reception ==
Professional ratings
Aggregate scores
Source	Rating
Metacritic	80/100
Review scores
Source	Rating
AllMusic	4/5 stars
Entertainment Weekly	B+
The Guardian	4/5 stars
Los Angeles Times	3/4 stars
NME	9/10
The Observer	5/5 stars
Pitchfork	6.2/10
Q	4/5 stars
Rolling Stone	3.5/5 stars
The Village Voice	B+

Confessions on a Dance Floor received critical acclaim. At Metacritic, which assigns a normalized rating out of 100 to reviews from mainstream critics, the album received a weighted average score of 80, based on 28 reviews. Keith Caulfield from Billboard commented that Confessions was a "welcome return to form for the Queen of Pop". Stephen Thomas Erlewine from AllMusic commented that Confessions was the first album where Madonna sounds like a veteran musician since she created the record for "the dance clubs or, in other words, Madonna's core audience." Alan Braidwood from the BBC called the album "magic" and named its tracks "Sorry", "Jump", "How High", "Push", and "Like it Or Not" as highlights. David Browne from Entertainment Weekly noted that, for "all its pretenses of being giddy and spontaneous, though, Confessions is rarely either."

Alexis Petridis from The Guardian said the album "may be a return to core values, but there's still a bravery about Confessions on a Dancefloor. It revels in the delights of wilfully plastic dance pop in an era when lesser dance-pop artists – from Rachel Stevens to Price's protege Juliet – are having a desperately thin time of it." Peter Robinson from Observer Music Monthly declared that the album ranks alongside Madonna's other albums like True Blue (1986) and Like a Prayer (1989). He credited producer Stuart Price for the album, noting that "Confessions clearly wouldn't exist without Madonna, but it's Price who steals the show." Stephen M. Deusner from Pitchfork noted that with the album "Madonna again reinvents herself, and it appears she's nearly lapped herself." According to Deusner, the music also makes her appear young. However, he felt that the first half of the album through "I Love New York" was strong, while the second half "loses its delicate balance between pop frivolity and spiritual gravity".

Thomas Inskeep from Stylus Magazine stated that the album is "Madonna's most purely beat-driven album since her self-titled 1983 debut" and "easily her finest effort since Ray of Light". Kelefa Sanneh from The New York Times called the album "exuberant". Christian John Wikane from PopMatters commented that the album "proved that Madonna, approaching 50 years-old, is a vital force in the ever-expansive landscape of popular music". Joan Morgan from The Village Voice noted that "[w]ith Confessions on a Dance Floor, Madonna at long last finds her musical footing. Easily dance record of the year, Confessions is an almost seamless tribute to the strobe-lit sensuality of the '80s New York club scene that gave Madge her roots, which she explores with compelling aplomb." Josh Tyrangiel from Time magazine commented that "In dance music, words exist to be repeated, twisted, obscured and resurrected. How they sound in the moment is far more important than what they mean, and Madonna knows that better than anyone. Confessions on a Dance Floor is 56 minutes of energetic moments. It will leave you feeling silly for all the right reasons."

Sal Cinquemani from Slant Magazine was impressed with the album and said "Madonna, with the help of Price, [...] has succeeded at creating a dance-pop odyssey with an emotional, if not necessarily narrative, arc — and one big continuously-mixed F you to the art-dismantling iPod Shuffle in the process." He compared the album to Kylie Minogue's album Light Years, saying "Comparisons to Light Years, Kylie Minogue's own discofied comeback album from 2000, are inevitable". Alan Light from Rolling Stone declared that the album showed that "Madonna has never lost her faith in the power of the beat." However, he opined that "Confessions on a Dance Floor won't stand the test of time like her glorious early club hits, but it proves its point. Like Rakim back in the day, Madonna can still move the crowd."

== Commercial performance ==
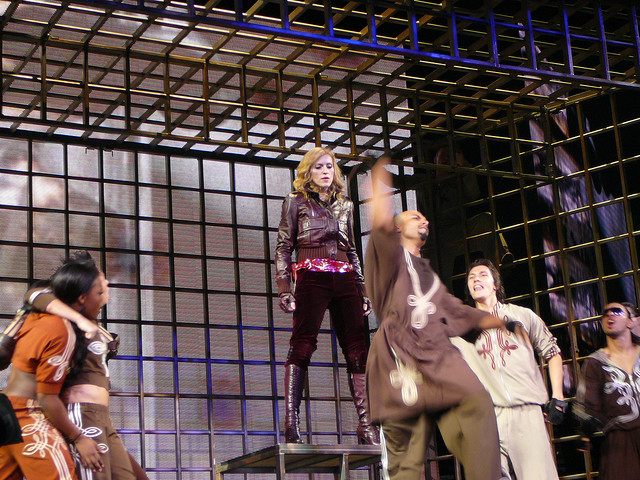
Madonna performing the album's second single, "Sorry", during the Confessions Tour. The song became Madonna's twelfth number-one single in the United Kingdom.

The album sold about 3.6 to 4 million copies worldwide during its first week of release. Despite being released late in the year, Confessions on a Dance Floor was ranked by the International Federation of the Phonographic Industry (IFPI) as the sixth biggest-selling album of 2005 worldwide, with sales of 6.3 million. Worldwide sales of the album stand at 10 million copies, and is considered to be one of the best-selling albums of the 21st century as well as one of the best-selling albums by women.

In the United States, the album debuted at number one on the Billboard 200, selling 350,000 copies in its first week. It became her sixth number-one album on the chart and the third consecutive studio album to debut at the top, following Music (2000) and American Life (2003). On December 14, 2005, the album was certified platinum by the Recording Industry Association of America (RIAA) for shipments of one million copies. As of December 2016, the album has sold over 1.734 million copies in America, according to Nielsen SoundScan. The album also debuted atop the charts in Canada, with first-week sales of 74,000. It was present on the chart for a total of 46 weeks and received a quintuple platinum certification from Music Canada (MC) for total shipment of 500,000 copies in the country. Confessions on a Dance Floor achieved commercial success in Latin American countries. It attained certifications in Chile, Brazil, Mexico, and became one of the highest-certified albums in Argentina by the Cámara Argentina de Productores de Fonogramas y Videogramas (CAPIF).

The album was also successful in Asia-Pacific countries. In Australia, Confessions on a Dance Floor debuted at the top of the ARIA Albums Chart for the issue dated November 21, 2005, and was present for a total of 33 weeks within the top 50 of the chart. It was certified two times platinum by the Australian Recording Industry Association (ARIA) denoting shipments of 140,000 copies. It debuted at number five on the New Zealand albums chart, and was certified platinum by Recorded Music NZ (RMNZ) for shipment of 15,000 copies. The same peak position was attained on the Oricon charts in Japan, where the album was certified double platinum for shipment of 500,000 copies by the Recording Industry Association of Japan (RIAJ). In Hong Kong, the album was awarded a Gold Disc Award by the IFPI for becoming one of ten biggest-selling international album for 2005.

The album found its biggest reception in Europe, where it topped the European Top 100 Albums chart for four weeks and was certified quadruple platinum by IFPI for shipping a total of four million copies across the continent. In the United Kingdom, Confessions on a Dance Floor debuted at the top of the UK Albums Chart with first-week sales of 217,610 units, her highest ever in the country. It became Madonna's ninth number-one album, and has sold 1,360,000 copies as of November 2020, according to the Official Charts Company, while being certified quadruple platinum by the British Phonographic Industry (BPI). That same week, the first single from the album, "Hung Up", topped the singles chart. The album became the fifth consecutive Madonna album to top the chart. Twenty years later, Madonna returned to the summit of the UK Dance Albums Chart, accumating a total of fourteen weeks at the top of the chart. In Ireland, the album debuted and peaked at number three. In France, the album debuted at position 113 on the albums chart, jumping to the top of the chart the next week. It was certified diamond by the Syndicat National de l'Édition Phonographique (SNEP), denoting shipments of 750,000 copies. Actual sales in France stand at between 800,000 and 900,000 units. In Italy, the album sold more than other international releases during the period of 2005–2006. Across Europe, the album peaked at number one in Austria, Belgium (Flanders and Wallonia), Denmark, Finland, France, Germany, Greece, Hungary, Norway, Poland, Spain, Sweden and Switzerland.

== Accolades ==
Madonna won the Best International Female Solo Artist at the 2006 BRIT Awards. She also won World's Best Selling Pop Artist and Best Selling U.S. Artist at the 2006 World Music Awards for the album. She was nominated for five awards at the 2006 MTV Video Music Awards for the music video of the album's first single, "Hung Up". Madonna was also nominated for Best Album of the Year, Best Pop Video, and Best Female Artist at the MTV Europe Music Awards 2006. She also won a Grammy Award in the category of "Best Dance/Electronic Album" at the 2007 ceremony. The album peaked at number one in 40 countries, earning a place in the Guinness World Records for topping the record charts in the most countries.

Rolling Stone ranked Confessions on a Dance Floor as the twenty-second top album of 2005. NME also placed it at number 29 on the magazine's list of the 50 best albums of 2005. Sal Cinquemani of Slant Magazine ranked the album in third place on his list of the top ten albums of 2005. The same magazine ranked the album as the 38th best from the 2000s. Three critics writing for Stylus Magazine also included Confessions on a Dance Floor in their year-end lists of the best albums of 2005. Q magazine named the record the 26th best album of 2005. In its ranking of the best albums of 2005, The Observer listed the album at number 26. By the end of the 2000s, Slant Magazine placed the album at number 38 on their list of "The 100 Best Albums of the Aughts". In 2015, Confessions on a Dance Floor was ranked third on "The 99 Greatest Dance Albums of All Time" by Vice magazine.

== Legacy ==
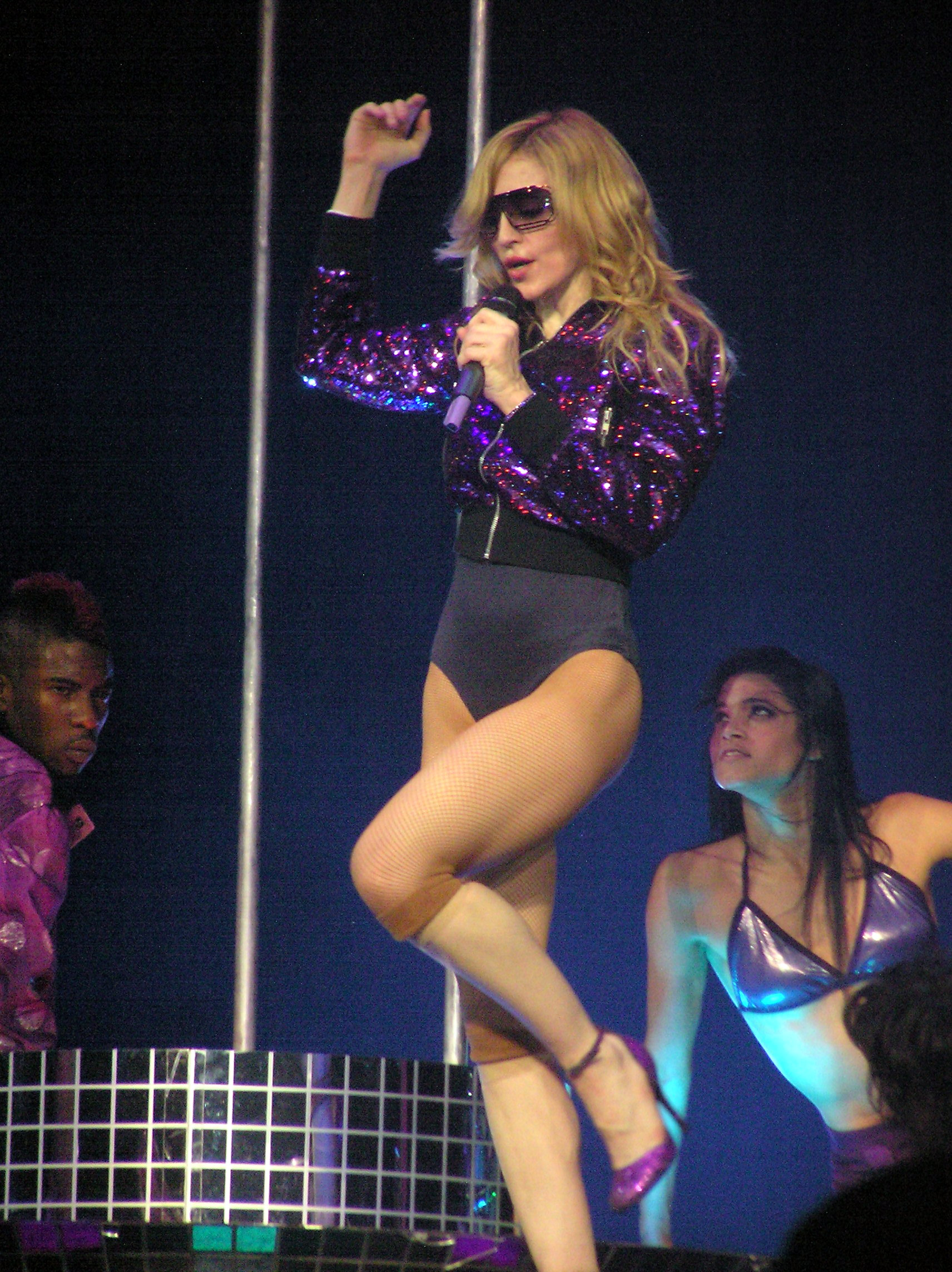
Madonna performing lead single "Hung Up" on the Confessions Tour. The song earned her a place in the Guinness Book of World Records.

Mike Nied from Idolator praised Confessions on a Dance Floor as one of the most influential pop albums of the decade and dubbed Madonna a "timeless trendsetter" and "creative genius". According to Michael Arceneaux from NBC News, it is "arguably her last great, impactful album; it's the last time she still felt truly forward-thinking, even if it looked back sonically." In 2015, David Hutchison of Attitude said Confessions on the Dancefloor was arguably the last time Madonna received near-universal acclaim for a body of work, believing her subsequent releases have gradually earned poorer reception from music critics. Christopher Rosa from VH1 called it her "best album to date" and explained that it is a "near-perfect pop record" and "her most natural reinvention". It was ranked as the third best dance album of all time by Vice magazine—the highest peak by a female performer. The magazine staff commented: "This is the album all her subsequent albums are compared to; for its enduring relevance and how it redefined Madonna as an artist, it should be". Author Sancho Xavi from El País noted that the album started the disco revival during the 21st century and popularized revival concepts in other musical genres during the first decade.

Justin Myers from the UK Official Charts Company commented: "An 'imperial phase' is when a pop star is at the pinnacle of their career, shifting stacks of records, having big hits, selling out arenas, owning the radio and being generally unavoidable and untouchable. Many pop acts barely manage one. Thanks to this album, Madonna claimed her third. How many popstars can honestly say that?" Calling her the "Mother of Reinvention", Jim Schembri from The Age wrote a detailed article of Madonna's impact with Confessions on a Dance Floor:

[The album] went straight to No. 1 everywhere except Mars. So too did the first single, "Hung Up", the video for which is on every time you turn on the TV. [Madonna] has reclaimed her place in the pop firmament with unrivaled ferocity. And she is a sterling example of pop survival. In a firmament that eats up artists like popcorn and where chart success is as fleeting as Jessica Simpson's attention span, Madonna remains an inspiring, intimidating beacon of permanence. Her longevity has thrived on her ability to continually reinvent herself by reading the winds of pop culture and taking her cue from there.

With the Confessions on a Dance Floor era, Madonna broke several world records and the album resuscitated her music sales and popularity, after the critical disappointment of American Life. At that time, Madonna became the best-selling female artist in the European market and the fifth best-selling artist overall with a quadruple platinum award by the IFPI, equivalent of 4 million copies sold across the continent. In the United Kingdom, Confessions on a Dance Floor became one of the fastest selling albums ever, with first week sales of 217,610 copies according to the Official Charts Company. Also, Madonna earned a place in the Guinness Book of World Records as the "oldest artist to simultaneously top the UK singles and album charts". The album's influence has been noted on other works, including Dua Lipa's 2020 album, Future Nostalgia, Kim Petras's 2022 EP, Slut Pop, and Romy's solo debut album Mid Air (2023).

In February 2025, Madonna revealed to be working on a sequel to the album, also to be produced by Stuart Price. The album, titled Confessions II, was released on July 3, 2026, via Warner. On November 9, 2026, the day of its 21st anniversary, Madonna announced a special boxset with both albums repackaged. Confessions on a Dance Floor Parts I & II is scheduled to be released in March 2027.

== Track listing ==
Standard edition
No.	Title	Writer(s)	Producer(s)	Length
1.	"Hung Up"	Madonna; Stuart Price; Benny Andersson; Björn Ulvaeus	Madonna; Price	5:37
2.	"Get Together"	Madonna; Anders Bagge; Peer Åström; Price	Madonna; Price	5:30
3.	"Sorry"	Madonna; Price	Madonna; Price	4:43
4.	"Future Lovers"	Madonna; Mirwais Ahmadzaï	Madonna; Ahmadzaï	4:51
5.	"I Love New York"	Madonna; Price	Madonna; Price	4:11
6.	"Let It Will Be"	Madonna; Ahmadzaï; Price	Madonna; Price	4:18
7.	"Forbidden Love"	Madonna; Price	Madonna; Price	4:22
8.	"Jump"	Madonna; Joe Henry; Price	Madonna; Price	3:46
9.	"How High"	Madonna; Christian Karlsson; Pontus Winnberg; Henrik Jonback	Madonna; Bloodshy & Avant; Price (co.)	4:40
10.	"Isaac"	Madonna; Price	Madonna; Price	6:03
11.	"Push"	Madonna; Price	Madonna; Price	3:57
12.	"Like It or Not"	Madonna; Karlsson; Winnberg; Jonback	Madonna; Bloodshy & Avant	4:31
Total length:				56:28

Twenty Years edition
No.	Title	Writer(s)	Producer(s)	Length
13.	"Fighting Spirit"	Madonna; Ahmadzaï	Madonna; Ahmadzaï	3:32
14.	"Super Pop"	Madonna; Ahmadzaï	Madonna; Ahmadzaï	3:42
15.	"History"	Madonna; Price	Madonna; Price	5:55
16.	"Hung Up" (Chus & Ceballos remix)	Madonna; Price; Andersson; Ulvaeus	Madonna; Price; Chus & Ceballos^{[a]}	10:23
17.	"Sorry" (PSB Max-mix)	Madonna; Price	Madonna; Price; Pet Shop Boys^{[a]}	8:35
18.	"Get Together" (Jacques Lu Cont mix)	Madonna; Bagge; Åström; Price	Madonna; Price^{[b]}	6:17
19.	"Jump" (Axwell remix)	Madonna; Henry; Price	Madonna; Price; Axwell^{[a]}	6:39
20.	"Hung Up" (Archigram remix)	Madonna; Price; Andersson; Ulvaeus	Madonna; Price; Archigram^{[a]}	6:57
Total length:				108:28

=== Notes ===
- ^{^[a]} signifies a remixer
- ^{^[b]} signifies a producer and remixer
- Tracks are mixed into one another. The unmixed edition has a total length of 55:57.
- Track 13 and 14 were initially available exclusively on the limited special and the Icon members edition.
- Japanese edition bonus DVD includes the music videos and behind the scenes of "Hung Up" and "Sorry".

=== Sample credits ===
- "Hung Up" samples "Gimme! Gimme! Gimme! (A Man After Midnight)", written by Benny Andersson and Björn Ulvaeus, and performed by ABBA.

== Personnel ==
Credits adapted from the album's liner notes.

- Madonna – lead vocals, backing vocals, producer
- Stuart Price – producer, keyboard, synthesizer, vocoder, programming, sequencing, sampling
- Roberta Carraro – keyboard, bass, drums, harmonica
- Yitzhak Sinwani – additional vocals on "Isaac"
- Monte Pittman – guitar
- Magnus "Mango" Wallbert – programming
- Steven Klein – photography
- Giovanni Bianco – art direction, graphic design
- Grubman Indursky – legal documents
- Guy Oseary – management
- Angela Becker – management
- Mark "Spike" Stent – mixing (Olympic Studios and Record Plant Studios, Los Angeles)
- Stuart Price – mixing ("Forbidden Love"); recording ("How High" and "Like It or Not") (at Murlyn Studios, Stockholm and Shirland Road); "Future Lovers" (at Mayfair Studios)
- Alex Dromgoole – assistant engineer
- David Emery – second assistant engineer
- Antony Kilhoffer – second assistant engineer (at Record Plant, Los Angeles)
- Brian "Big Bass" Gardner – mastering (at Bernie Grundman Mastering)

== Charts ==
=== Weekly charts ===
Weekly chart performance during 2005-2006
Chart (2005–2006)	Peak position
Argentine Albums (CAPIF)	2
Australian Albums (ARIA)	1
Australian Dance Albums (ARIA)	1
Austrian Albums (Ö3 Austria)	1
Belgian Albums (Ultratop Flanders)	1
Belgian Albums (Ultratop Wallonia)	1
Brazilian Albums (ABPD)	1
Canadian Albums (Billboard)	1
Chilean Albums (IFPI)	1
Croatian Albums (TOTS)	1
Czech Albums (ČNS IFPI)	2
Danish Albums (Hitlisten)	1
Dutch Albums (Album Top 100)	1
European Albums (Billboard)	1
Finnish Albums (Suomen virallinen lista)	1
French Albums (SNEP)	1
German Albums (Offizielle Top 100)	1
Greek Albums (IFPI)	1
Hong Kong Albums (IFPI)	1
Hungarian Albums (MAHASZ)	1
Irish Albums (IRMA)	3
Israeli Albums (Media Forest)	1
Italian Albums (FIMI)	1
Japanese Albums (Oricon)	5
Mexican Albums (Mexico Top 100)	3
New Zealand Albums (RMNZ)	5
Norwegian Albums (VG-lista)	1
Polish Albums (ZPAV)	1
Portuguese Albums (AFP)	1
Scottish Albums (Official Charts)	1
Singaporean Albums (IFPI)	1
Spanish Albums (Promusicae)	1
Swedish Albums (Sverigetopplistan)	1
Swiss Albums (Schweizer Hitparade)	1
Taiwanese Albums (IFPI Taiwan)	1
UK Albums (Official Charts)	1
UK Dance Albums (Official Charts)	1
US Billboard 200	1
US Top Dance Albums (Billboard)	1

2010 weekly chart performance
Chart (2010)	Peak position
Russian Vinyl Albums (Lenta)	24

Weekly chart performance
Chart (2026)	Peak position
Japanese Top Albums Sales (Billboard Japan)	100
UK Album Downloads (OCC)	16
UK Albums Sales (OCC)	26

Weekly chart performance of the Twenty Years edition
Chart (2025)	Peak position
UK Albums Downloads Chart (OCC)	2
UK Dance Albums (Official Charts)	1

=== Monthly charts ===
2005 monthly chart performance
Chart (2005)	Peak position
South Korean Albums (RIAK)	6
Japanese Albums (Oricon)	3

2006 monthly chart performance
Chart (2006)	Peak position
Czech Albums (ČNS IFPI)	9
Uruguayan International Albums (CUD)	3

=== Decade-end charts ===
2000-2009 decade chart performance
Chart (2000–2009)	Position
Dutch Albums (Album Top 100)	41
UK Albums (OCC)	82
US Dance/Electronic Albums (Billboard)	2

=== All-time charts ===
All-time chart performance
Chart	Position
Irish Women Albums (IRMA)	45
UK Women Albums (OCC) 2000–2020	32

=== Year-end charts ===
2005 year-end chart performance
Chart (2005)	Position
Australian Albums (ARIA)	44
Australian Dance Albums (ARIA)	4
Austrian Albums (Ö3 Austria)	12
Belgian Albums (Ultratop Flanders)	14
Belgian Albums (Ultratop Wallonia)	2
Danish Albums (Hitlisten)	12
Dutch Albums (Album Top 100)	10
Finnish Foreign Albums (Suomen virallinen lista)	5
French Albums (SNEP)	4
German Albums (Offizielle Top 100)	39
Hungarian Albums (MAHASZ)	13
Irish Albums (IRMA)	20
Italian Albums (FIMI)	10
Mexican Albums (Top 100 Mexico)	54
Mexican English Albums (Top 100 Mexico)	14
Spanish Albums (PROMUSICAE)	15
Swedish Albums (Sverigetopplistan)	2
Swedish Albums & Compilations (Sverigetopplistan)	3
Swiss Albums (Schweizer Hitparade)	9
UK Albums (OCC)	15
US Albums (SoundScan)	43
Worldwide Albums (IFPI)	6

2006 year-end chart performance
Chart (2006)	Position
Argentine Albums (CAPIF)	10
Australian Albums (ARIA)	28
Australian Dance Albums (ARIA)	3
Austrian Albums (Ö3 Austria)	13
Belgian Albums (Ultratop Flanders)	14
Belgian Albums (Ultratop Wallonia)	19
Danish Albums (Hitlisten)	16
Dutch Albums (Album Top 100)	22
European Top 100 Albums (Billboard)	2
Finnish Foreign Albums (Suomen virallinen lista)	10
French Albums (SNEP)	21
German Albums (Offizielle Top 100)	13
Greek Albums (IFPI)	50
Greek Foreign Albums (IFPI)	13
Hungarian Albums (MAHASZ)	16
Hungarian Albums & Compilations (MAHASZ)	5
Italian Albums (FIMI)	8
Japanese Albums (Oricon)	37
Mexican Albums (Top 100 Mexico)	21
Mexican English Albums (Top 100 Mexico)	6
Spanish Albums (PROMUSICAE)	20
Swedish Albums (Sverigetopplistan)	24
Swedish Albums & Compilations (Sverigetopplistan)	29
Swiss Albums (Schweizer Hitparade)	4
UK Albums (OCC)	46
US Billboard 200	22
US Dance/Electronic Albums (Billboard)	1

2007 year-end chart performance
Chart (2007)	Position
Australian Dance Albums (ARIA)	42
Belgian Midprice Albums (Ultratop Flanders)	17
Belgian Midprice Albums (Ultratop Wallonia)	3
French Combined Albums (SNEP/IFOP)	205
Hungarian Albums & Compilations (MAHASZ)	98
US Dance/Electronic Albums (Billboard)	7

2008 year-end chart performance
Chart (2008)	Position
French Catalog Albums (SNEP/IFOP)	22

== Certifications and sales ==
Certifications and sales
Region	Certification	Certified units/sales
Argentina (CAPIF)	5× Platinum	200,000^{^}
Australia (ARIA)	2× Platinum	200,000 (Note: Australian estimated sales as of 2015.)
Belgium (BRMA)	Platinum	50,000^{*}
Brazil (Pro-Música Brasil)	Gold	94,061
Canada (Music Canada)	5× Platinum	500,000^{^}
Chile	Gold	10,000
Czech Republic (ČNS IFPI)	Gold	5,000
Denmark (IFPI Danmark)	5× Platinum	100,000^{‡}
Finland (Musiikkituottajat)	Platinum	54,588
France (SNEP)	Diamond	900,000
Germany (BVMI)	3× Platinum	600,000^{^}
Greece (IFPI Greece)	2× Platinum	40,000^{^}
Hong Kong (IFPI Hong Kong)	Gold	10,000^{*}
Hungary (MAHASZ)	2× Platinum	20,000^{^}
Ireland (IRMA)	4× Platinum	60,000^{^}
Italy (FIMI) sales 2005-2006	4× Platinum	400,000 (Note: Italian sales as of 2006 according to Musica e dischi.)
Italy (FIMI) sales since 2009	Gold	25,000^{‡}
Japan (RIAJ)	2× Platinum	700,000
Mexico (AMPROFON)	Platinum	100,000^{^}
Netherlands (NVPI)	Platinum	120,000 (Note: Dutch estimated sales as of 2008 according to Dagblad De Pers.)
New Zealand (RMNZ)	Platinum	15,000^{^}
Norway	—	90,000 (Note: Norwegian estimated sales as of 2006.)
Poland (ZPAV)	Platinum	23,000 (Note: Polish estimated sales as of 2006.)
Portugal (AFP)	2× Platinum	40,000^{^}
Russia (NFPF)	5× Platinum	100,000^{*}
South Korea	—	5,248 (Note: South Korean sales as of November 2005 according to the Music Industry Association of Korea (MIAK).)
Spain (Promusicae)	2× Platinum	200,000^{^}
Sweden (GLF)	2× Platinum	120,000^{^}
Switzerland (IFPI Switzerland)	3× Platinum	120,000^{^}
Taiwan	—	29,000 (Note: Taiwanese estimated sales as of January 2006.)
United Kingdom (BPI)	4× Platinum	1,360,000
United States (RIAA)	Platinum	1,734,000 (Note: U.S sales as of 2016, according to Nielsen SoundScan.)
Summaries
Europe (IFPI)	4× Platinum	4,000,000^{*}
Worldwide	—	10,000,000
^{*} Sales figures based on certification alone.^{^} Shipments figures based on certification alone.^{‡} Sales+streaming figures based on certification alone.

== Release history ==
Release dates
Country	Date	Format	Label	Ref.
Italy	November 9, 2005	CD, Cassette (Cassette releases in certain regions)	Warner Bros.	
Germany	November 11, 2005	CD, Cassette (Cassette releases in certain regions)	Warner Bros.	
France	November 14, 2005	CD, Cassette (Cassette releases in certain regions)	Warner Bros.	
Spain	November 14, 2005	CD, Cassette (Cassette releases in certain regions)	Warner Bros.	
United Kingdom	November 14, 2005	CD, Cassette (Cassette releases in certain regions)	Warner Bros.	
Canada	November 15, 2005	CD, Cassette (Cassette releases in certain regions)	Warner Bros.	
United States	November 15, 2005	CD, Cassette (Cassette releases in certain regions)	Warner Bros.	
Japan	November 16, 2005	CD, Cassette (Cassette releases in certain regions)	Warner Bros.	
France	February 13, 2006	LP	Warner Bros.	
United Kingdom	March 6, 2006	LP	Warner Bros.	
Germany	March 24, 2006	LP	Warner Bros.	
Worldwide	November 7, 2025	Digital download, Streaming (Twenty Years Edition)	Warner Bros.	

== See also ==
- List of best-selling albums by women
- List of best-selling albums of the 21st century
- List of best-selling albums in Argentina
- List of best-selling albums in France
- List of best-selling albums of the 2000s in the United Kingdom
- List of European number-one hits of 2005
- List of European number-one hits of 2006
- List of number-one albums in Norway
- List of number-one albums of 2005 (Australia)
- List of number-one albums of 2005 (Canada)
- List of number-one albums of 2005 (Portugal)
- List of number-one albums of 2005 (Poland)
- List of number-one albums of 2005 (U.S.)
- List of number-one electronic albums of 2005 (U.S.)
- List of number-one electronic albums of 2006 (U.S.)
- List of number-one hits of 2005 (France)
- List of number-one hits of 2005 (Germany)
- List of number-one hits of 2005 (Italy)
- List of works by Stuart Price
- Top selling singles and albums in Ireland 2005
