= Gift Grub 6: The Special One =

Studio album by Mario Rosenstock
- Released: November 2005
- Recorded: Ireland
- Genre: Novelty
- Label: EMI

Mario Rosenstock chronology
Gift Grub: The Best of 2004 (2004)	Gift Grub 6: The Special One (2005)

Gift Grub 6: The Special One is the sixth annual collection of comedy sketches from Today FM's Gift Grub show. The album, released in November 2005, takes its name from the moniker of José Mourinho, then the manager of Chelsea. The album peaked at the number one position in the Irish Albums Chart.

== Track listing ==
1. Bertie's Nightmare - Taoiseach Bertie Ahern has a nightmare where nothing is the way he remembers it. Manchester United have plummeted to the Vauxhall Conference League, Hector Ó hEochagáin has become president of Ireland, his daughter has married Royston Brady instead of Nicky from Westlife, Liam Lawlor is an honest man, he can't find a pint of Bass anywhere, Fine Gael's Enda Kenny is now Taoiseach, with Gerry Adams as his Tánaiste, Bertie himself is a lowly backbencher in the Dáil.
2. Pope Idol - A takeoff on Pop Idol. Ant & Dec present a show to find the next pope. The contest is judged by Simon Cowell, Pete Waterman and Sharon Osbourne.
3. Newsflash 1 - Bryan Dobson (or "Dobbo") of the RTÉ News joins a panel of celebrities to discuss why the chicken crossed the road.
4. Hector v Hector - The real Hector Ó hEochagáin was in studio when he was joined by Gift Grub's impressionist and this led to some confusion as to who was the real Hector.
5. Newsflash 2 - RTÉ News' Jim Fahy reports on how popstar Chris de Burgh was found inside a glass bottle.
6. Team Manchester - After the Glazers' takeover of Manchester United, the players now speak with American accents and the team has now become more like an American sports franchise.
7. Where Are The Sausages? - An episode of the 5-part 'Villa' series. Mary Harney is unable to make breakfast as there are no sausages. She accuses Tom Cruise, Gerry Adams, Daniel O'Donnell and Hector Ó hEochagáin.
8. Radio Jay Meets The Thrills - Radio presenter, and brother of Roy Keane, Johnson (or Jay as he prefers to be known) meets Irish pop-rock outfit The Thrills.
9. A Flock Of Ronan - A selection of clips featuring Ronan Keating. Including Ronan replacing Eminem after he pulled out of the Slane Castle concert and an episode featuring Ronan and a golf cart.
10. Newsflash 3 - Plastic Sheeting gives us a report on the unknown whereabouts of Cork Culture.
11. Eddie Hobbs In Neverland - Financial adviser Eddie Hobbs visits Michael Jackson in his Neverland Ranch, showing him how to "tighten the belt".
12. José and his Amazing Technicolor Overcoat - The famous José Mourinho sketch.
13. Newsflash 4 - A report on the whereabouts of a discarded Brian McFadden hairstyle.
14. Naked Camera - Jay sets up Irish politician Michael D. Higgins candid camera style in Dublin Airport.
15. Bertie's Rhinos - Bertie attends the dedication of two new rhinos to Dublin Zoo. Guests include Roy Keane (who really wants to see a lion) and music by Ronan Keating.
16. The World Toilet Summit - Plastic Sheeting reports from 'The World Toilet Summit' in Belfast. Ronan Keating, Gerry Adams and The Thrills have all taken part.
17. Andy - A parody of Barry Manilow's "Mandy". Bertie Ahern struggles to get served by a bartender named Andy.
18. Taxi - After budget cuts within the RTÉ news correspondents are required to share a taxi to work together. There is also a bonus segment at the end of this track . It is a short clip from 'The Villa' in the pool. The characters discuss St. Patrick's Day.
