= Ian Dempsey =

Irish television and radio broadcaster

- Born: Ian D. Dempsey; 16 January 1961 (age 65); Dublin, Ireland
- Occupation: Broadcaster
- Employer(s): RTÉ (1980–1998); Today FM (1998–present)
- Known for: Children's television, breakfast radio show,
- Website: Official website

Ian Dempsey (born 16 January 1961) is an Irish presenter of television and breakfast radio. He is the long-running presenter of the breakfast show on Today FM, self-titled The Ian Dempsey Breakfast Show, which runs from 6-9 am each weekday. He has won several major awards for his programmes and was the Republic of Ireland's tenth most-listened-to broadcaster in 2007.

Dempsey co-hosted the opening ceremony of the 2011 Special Olympics World Summer Games Irish heats at Thomond Park with Des Cahill.

== Early life ==
Dempsey began his first experiments in radio in 1967 when at the age of six he made his first radio show in a friend's house. In 1978 he joined Dublin pirate station Capital Radio (Dublin), and later worked for Alternative Radio Dublin and Radio 257.

== Career ==
=== RTÉ ===
On 29 February 1980, he joined the national broadcaster, Raidió Teilifís Éireann (RTÉ), to present The Weekend Breakfast Show on RTÉ 2fm, and later, shows such as Poparama, The Hotline, Night Train and The Great Giveaway Show. Dempsey later hosted the lunchtime show before moving to the breakfast slot in the mid-1980s. He picked up where Marty Whelan had left off, engaging the audience with his natural personality, a world apart from the 'jocks' that stalked the Radio Centre in Montrose at the time. Apart from a brief time off breakfast following 2fm's 1989 relaunch, he has remained on early mornings since. Maxi was placed on the breakfast show at that time, but, after a few weeks, it was apparent to all that her style was not suited to the format; Dempsey was promptly reinstated.

1986 saw Dempsey's first major exposure to television, with the children's show Dempsey's Den, which also gave the alien twin puppets Zig and Zag their first break to the small screen. Noted for his choice of brightly coloured jumpers, Dempsey presented The Den until the summer of 1990 and later reflected on his time at the helm in a 2008 RTÉ documentary. He also worked on various TV shows including the pop music quiz show Number 1 and three seasons of The Beatbox, a two-hour music video show simulcast on Network 2 and RTÉ 2fm. He was also the first host of the Irish version of Talkabout.

Dempsey weathered the storm of the advent of independent radio in Ireland on RTÉ 2fm breakfast. His style was informal and relaxed. His rapport with Des Cahill was particularly strong. John Clarke, later head of RTÉ 2fm, produced the show and occasionally deputized.

=== Today FM ===
Dempsey shocked the Irish radio world in 1998 by announcing a move to the newly relaunched Today FM. He had been tempted by a sizable salary package to join the station that 12 months beforehand had languished with a minimal JNLR result. He left RTÉ for Today FM in July 1998 and since 21 September 1998 (when his breakfast show was launched) he has worked at the station with his Gift Grub team providing comedic value. 2fm has struggled to find a suitable replacement ever since. Attempts have included Hector Ó hEochagáin, Ryan Tubridy, Colm Hayes and Marty Whelan in recent years. When the move was announced he was refused entry to the Montrose campus and publicly complained that over 20,000 albums of his were not returned to him by RTÉ. In recent years it has been widely reported that 2fm has tried to tempt him back. In 2007 Dempsey started presenting an online radio show for Irish people abroad called The Craic.

Dempsey appeared on The Restaurant where he bamboozled the critics with his Mini Bloody Mary Burgers, JFK's Lidded Lobster Soup, Swedish Meatballs, Tagliatelle with Lightly Curried Prawns, Deeply Bitter Chocolate Mousse and a dish he called "The Bomb".

In late August 2015, Dempsey and Today FM colleague Louise Duffy presented The Seven O’Clock Show on TV3 filling in for usual hosts Martin King and Lucy Kennedy.

== Personal life ==
Dempsey lives in Sutton, Dublin. He is married to Ger and has three children. Evan is a member of the band The Kapitals who have played the Oxegen Festival twice while Shane works as an engineer for Today FM.

== Awards ==
Dempsey was nominated in the category of Best Radio DJ - National at the 2010 Meteor Awards.

On 16 September 2016, it was announced that Dempsey had been inducted into the PPI Radio Awards Hall of Fame along with RTE 2FM DJ Dave Fanning and South East Radio's Eamonn Buttle and Downtown Radio's Trevor Campbell.

Year	Nominee / work	Award	Result
2010	Ian Dempsey	Best Radio DJ - National	Nominated
