= Special Savings Incentive Account =

Savings account in Ireland

A Special Saving Incentive Account (SSIA) was a type of interest-bearing account in Ireland. These accounts were available to open between 1 May 2001 and 30 April 2002, and featured a state-provided top-up of 25% of the sum deposited.

== Scheme details ==
Introduced in the Finance Act 2001, the SSIA was structured so that the Government of Ireland contributed one euro for every four invested by the account holder. The maximum contribution was €254 (IR£200) per month. For deposit account SSIAs, banks paid interest on top of the government bonus and principal accumulated. Equity SSIAs were also available to investors seeking higher returns than the state-guaranteed minimum of 25%. The scheme, which was restricted to those over eighteen, was most popular among middle-income earners. All SSIAs matured five years from the date of opening.

== Intended effects ==
In 2006/7 the maturing SSIA funds were hoped to boost the slowing Irish economy. The funds amounted to €14 billion and were expected to increase the purchasing power of Irish consumers who would in turn help the Irish economy through increased spending. Due to poor external contribution and the weakening construction sector, consumer spending was expected to help sustain relatively high economic growth, with projections that SSIAs could contribute to a boost of up to 1.9%. This consumer expenditure was an important factor in increasing government's tax revenue for its ambitious capital expenditure plans.

== Criticisms ==
Opposition parties questioned the effectiveness of the scheme in dampening inflation (running at 7% at its peak) and also the timing of the maturities, which they claimed would benefit the government at the 2007 general election.
