= Eddie Hobbs =

Irish financial advisor, journalist, author and conspiracy theorist.

President of Renua
- In office 13 March 2015 – June 2016
- Leader: Lucinda Creighton
- Succeeded by: Mailo Power

Personal details
- Born: 10 November 1962 (age 63) Cork, Ireland
- Party: Renua (2015-2016)
- Occupation: Politician TV Presenter Financial Advisor

Eddie Hobbs (born 10 November 1962) is an Irish financial adviser, writer, campaigner, podcaster, and former television presenter and political figure.

Hobbs rose to prominence in the 1990s through consumer advocacy in the financial sector. In 1993, he published a report titled Endowment Mortgages: The Hometruth, which examined the sale of insurance-linked investment products used to repay home mortgages. As a director of the Consumers Association of Ireland, he submitted a complaint to the Competition Authority concerning fee transparency in the insurance industry. In 1998, the Competition Authority ruled that the industry had operated practices that obscured charges from consumers. Hobbs subsequently advised the Government on the Consumer Credit Act and contributed to the development of the Insurance Act 2000, which introduced disclosure requirements for the market.

Hobbs rose to further prominence in the 2000s as a consumer advocate on RTÉ, presenting programmes including Show Me The Money, The Give or Take Club, Rip-Off Republic, My Civil War, and 30 Things to Do with Your SSIA. During this period he developed a public profile through television, radio, print media, and book publishing, and was noted for commentary on the cost of living and government economic policy.

Hobbs is the director of Hobbs Financial Practice Ltd, a financial services firm. In 2007, he co-founded Brendan Investments, a property fund focused on overseas markets, serving as a non-executive director until early 2015. In 2017, media reports stated that the fund had lost approximately 90 per cent of its investors' capital.

In 2015, Hobbs co-founded the political party Renua and served as its president. He resigned in 2016 after the party failed to win Dáil representation. He stated that he had sought to move the party away from social conservatism towards a liberal democratic orientation.

From the late 2010s, Hobbs has commented on topics including COVID-19 policy, media regulation, immigration, gender-affirming healthcare, and international governance through organisations such as the WHO, UN, and WEF. During the COVID-19 pandemic, he expressed scepticism regarding lockdowns, mRNA vaccinations, and referenced organisations including the Rothschilds, Bilderberg Group, and Soros Foundation in discussions of international coordination.

Hobbs presents Counterpoint, a current affairs interview series, on YouTube and other platforms. Hobbs has interviewed figures including Steve Bannon, Malachy Steenson, Ben Gilroy, Derek Blighe, Francis Boyle, Judith Curry, Douglas Macgregor, Alan Shatter, Ken O'Flynn, and Linda de Courcy.

In January 2026, Hobbs organised the IRL Forum in Ashbourne, County Meath, a two-day event featuring twelve panels on Irish policy topics. The US Ambassador attended the event. The Irish Times published commentary critical of Hobbs on the opening day; Hobbs responded in a letter published by the newspaper.

== Television career ==
Hobbs presented the television show Show Me the Money on RTÉ, in which he helped people from various backgrounds to improve their finances. The programme won two IFTA TV awards.

In 2005, Hobbs presented Rip-Off Republic, a programme focused on artificially high development land prices, personal taxation, corporate margins, and cartels and monopolies in Ireland. (The term "Ripoff Republic" was first used in an article in The Irish Independent in 2003 by consumer affairs journalist Eddie Lennon.) In Rip-Off Republic, Hobbs advised consumers to post nappies to the Department of Enterprise, Trade and Employment to object to the Groceries Order 1987, on the basis that nappies were listed as a grocery and the Act made it an offence for retailers to pass through discounts from manufacturers. Thousands of nappies were subsequently posted, and the Groceries Order was repealed by the government in 2005.

In 2006, Hobbs presented 30 Things to Do with Your SSIA, a three-part programme offering ideas for spending money held in a Special Savings Incentive Account (SSIA). He advised viewers against investing their SSIAs, along with borrowed bank money, in Irish investment property (RIPS), and explained investment in property PLCs as an alternative. He outlined Minsky's bubble theory and suggested the Irish market was at the latter steps of it. In Show Me the Money he had advised since 2004 that property prices in Ireland were likely to fall, and advised against residential investment property purchase in Ireland. In 2007, Irish property prices started to reverse.

During the run-up to the 2007 Irish general election, Hobbs and Matt Cooper presented Polls Apart on TV3, in which they interviewed the main Irish political party leaders about their policy intentions.

He co-presented RTÉ's The Consumer Show from 2010 to 2012. He quit the show in 2012, citing concerns of being "stifled".

Hobbs presented My Civil War, a social history television programme on the Irish Civil War, with RTÉ's documentary unit.

In November 2013, he presented an hour-long pilot of The Give or Take Club, an experiment in social co-operation based in a rural town, in a joint venture between Endemol, RTÉ, Independent Pictures, and the presenter.

Hobbs presents Counterpoint, a current affairs interview series on YouTube and other platforms, in which he interviews public figures on Irish and international policy topics.

== Publications ==
In 2004, Hobbs released Short Hands Long Pockets, his first book, as a fundraiser for the Jack and Jill Children's Foundation, for which he has acted as patron since 2005.

His second book, LOOT!, was published in 2006. In it, he advised readers to reduce debt to under 50% of assets, move to AAA-rated banks, exit equities, buy bonds, and own some gold.

In March 2009, Hobbs released his third book, Debt Busters, published by Currach Press.

In 2022, Hobbs published The First Heresy, a historical fiction novel, through Liberties Press. The novel traces a secret smuggled out of Jerusalem after its fall in AD 70 to the philosopher Hypatia of Alexandria, then forward to medieval Ireland and France, where a Norman youth, a retired Templar Knight, and a Persian-descended scholar connected to the Templars become drawn into a pursuit by agents of the French crown. Hobbs began writing the book during the 2020 lockdown.

From 2007 to 2010, Hobbs was editorial director of the monthly magazine You & Your Money, owned and published by Ashville Publications. He also wrote weekly columns for the Daily Star, Sunday Independent, and Sunday Business Post.

== Financial career ==
=== Brendan Investments ===
Brendan Investments Plc was launched in 2007 as a ten-year collective investment in European property for smaller investors, after obtaining Central Bank approval as the first retail investment product to comply with the EU Prospectus Directive. The intake at under €13 million fell short of expectations. Although the fund entered the stable German commercial property market, it was set back by early losses when its anchor tenant, Arcandor, Germany's largest retail group, went into liquidation during the banking crisis, and by restricted bank credit. The company was subsequently liquidated after experiencing heavy losses in the Detroit housing refurbishing market following a valuation slump in 2016–2019 caused by a lead water crisis that erupted in Flint to the north.

Hobbs has acknowledged miscalculating post-2008 inflation expectations; having advised mortgage holders to fix rates in anticipation of inflation, the ECB instead cut rates to historic lows.

== Consumer and public advocacy ==
Hobbs was appointed by the Irish government as a director of the National Consumer Agency (NCA) in 2007, having served on its interim board since 2005. He was criticised in 2008 by the Irish Independent for poor attendance of NCA board meetings, which he acknowledged and attributed to poor scheduling. He resigned in 2009, citing his discomfort with a loan given to another board member and dissatisfaction with Minister for Enterprise Mary Coughlan, to whom the NCA reported.

Hobbs campaigned against a government levy on private pension savings, encouraging savers to instruct pension trustees to refuse Revenue Commissioners' demands. The Finance Act was subsequently amended to provide for a €380 daily fine for trustees who delayed payment. Hobbs also directed a letter campaign urging President McAleese to refer the Act to the Supreme Court; she signed it into law. The total taken in the pension levy to 2015 is estimated at €2 billion.

In a 2012 article in The Wall Street Journal, Hobbs described the Irish Government as "a Vichy government—captive externally to creditors [...] and internally to a tribe of insiders led by union godfathers in a deal that protects the government's own excessive pay and pensions while bankers lean over its shoulders to rewrite insolvency laws. This isn't just crony capitalism. It's crony democracy".

In 2013, Hobbs helped set up Own Our Oil, a citizens' advocacy group focused on overhauling Ireland's oil and gas licensing regime, and made a pre-Budget submission in July 2013 calling for the sale of licences to be treated like development land rezoning and subject to Capital Gains Tax of 66% to recover economic rents for the Irish people. In March 2014, Hobbs published Own Our Oil – the Fight for Ireland's Economic Freedom, a compilation of essays from a multi-discipline team of writers covering planning, environment, taxation, strategy, industry, geology, and history, and commenced a national public briefing campaign.

During the Irish Water controversy, Hobbs called for the redrafting of Article 10 of the Irish constitution to return ownership of all natural resources to the Irish people from ownership by the state (which, he argued, the state had taken in the 1937 Constitution), reducing the state's role to a trustee required to act in the common good but justiciable through the courts when in breach of its duties. This was intended to prevent the state from selling off natural resources, including water, to preserve itself during future crises.

== Political career ==
Ahead of the 2009 Irish local elections, Hobbs endorsed the Green Party, stating, "In the coming age of scarcity the prosperity or ruin of the Irish economy pivots on the speed that we can become energy independent. The Greens get it. So does Obama. That’s why, even though facing the huge challenge of living with Fianna Fáil, the Greens continue to get my support".

=== Renua ===
As part of Renua's formal launch on 13 March 2015, Hobbs appeared alongside Lucinda Creighton on The Late Late Show to explain the party's platform. On the day, there was initial confusion about whether Hobbs would stand as a Renua candidate in the forthcoming 2016 Irish general election, with Hobbs downplaying the prospect but Renua's official website listing him as a candidate. Hobbs did not stand for the party but served as its president from its launch until June 2016.

The party secured 2.5% of the vote in the 2016 general election and qualified for government funding, one of its key targets, but failed to get any of its candidates elected, including Creighton. Hobbs has stated that during his time as party president, he attempted to shift the party's positioning from social conservatism towards a Liberal Democratic orientation. However, he has said his efforts were hindered by the fact that the majority of members had joined on the expectation that Renua would be, either explicitly or implicitly, an anti-abortion party.

=== Social Progress Index ===
Hobbs has stated that he sought to make advocacy for a Social Progress Index a key policy plank of Renua. In 2019, Hobbs fundraised and sponsored a paper from Professor Cal Muckley of University College Dublin advocating for a Social Progress Index for Ireland. It was launched in February 2020 and adopted by the Irish Business and Employers Confederation (IBEC) and the Irish Small and Medium Enterprises Association (ISME) as key policies. The Social Progress Index later became the opening feature in the Programme for Government formed by the Fine Gael–Fianna Fáil–Green coalition.

In March 2022, Hobbs described his political orientation as that of a "radical centrist".

== Public commentary and controversies ==
=== Vaccination passport controversy ===
On 29 June 2021, Hobbs tweeted "badges so the terrified can identify the unvaccinated among us"; the tweet included a Star of David. The Auschwitz-Birkenau State Museum replied that comparing the Holocaust to COVID-19 vaccines "that saves human lives is a sad symptom of moral and intellectual decline". Hobbs deleted the initial tweet and in response tweeted "Vaccine Passports instead of antigen testing is morally the wrong move", describing it as a "slippery slope". He campaigned on Twitter on two issues: the use of vaccine passports and the vaccination of healthy children.

=== Media views ===
In a 2025 interview with Steve Bannon, Hobbs described the Irish mainstream media as "the North Korea of Europe". Hobbs has argued that Irish media engages in what he terms "agnogenesis", or the manufactured production of ignorance through propaganda, and has criticised what he describes as a diminution in critical thinking and the influence of stakeholder capitalism in Irish policymaking.
