= Mario Rosenstock =

Irish actor, comedian and musician

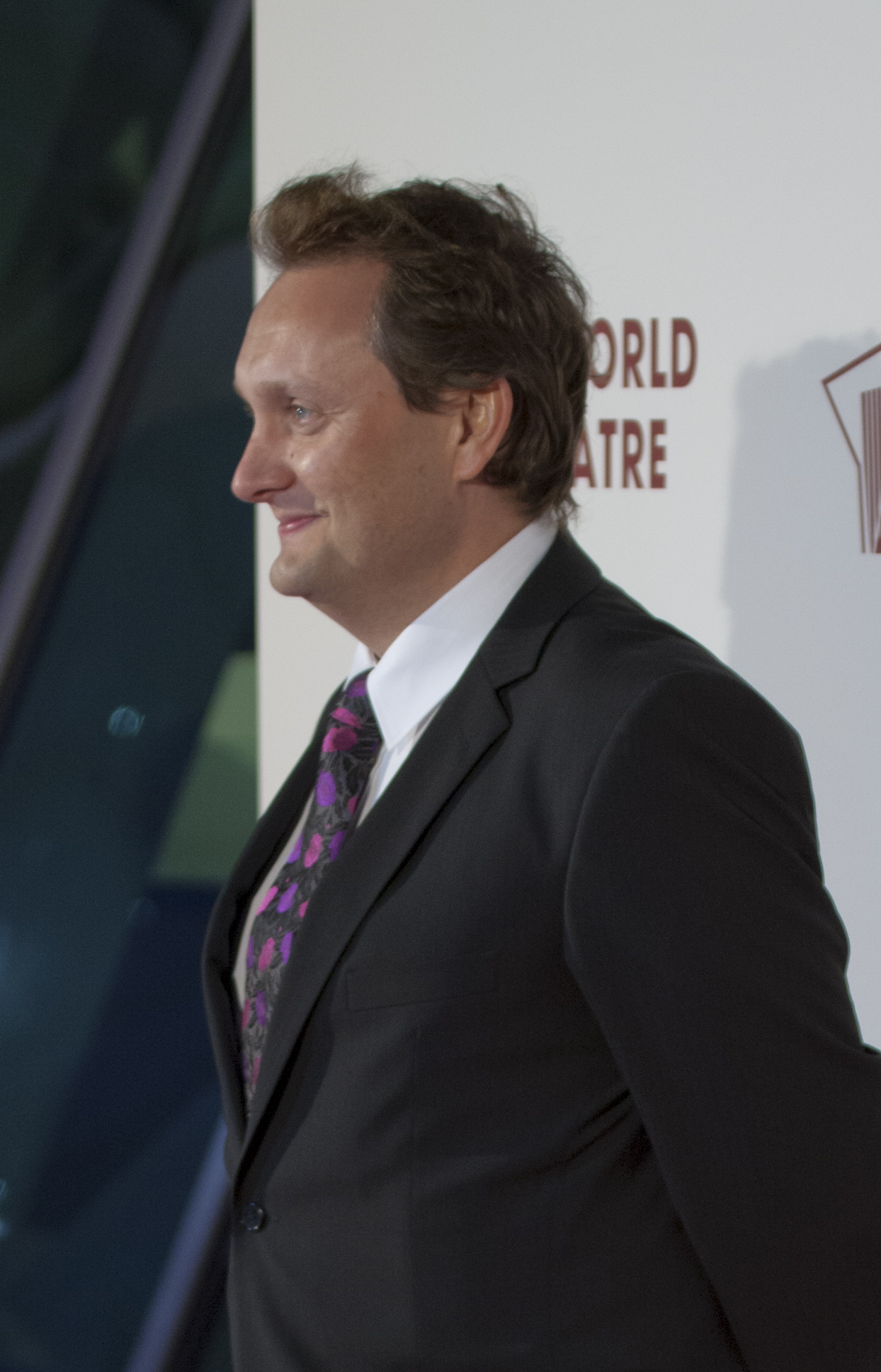
- Rosenstock at the opening of the Bord Gáis Energy Theatre in 2010
- Born: 31 August 1970 (age 56); London, United Kingdom
- Notable work: Gift Grub
- Spouse: Bláthnaid Rosenstock
- Children: 2

Mario Rosenstock (born 31 August 1970) is an Irish actor, comedian, impressionist and musician.

== Career ==
Rosenstock first came to the attention of the Irish public playing the role of Dr. David Hanlon in the soap Glenroe in the 1990s.

However, he is now best known for the popular Gift Grub segments which have featured on The Ian Dempsey Breakfast Show on Today FM since May 1999, which Rosenstock created alongside Paul McLoone, a radio presenter with Today FM and also frontman of the Northern Irish pop-punk/new-wave band The Undertones, which occurred in 1999 and when McLoone served as a producer for The Ian Dempsey Breakfast Show. Gift Grub is a series of comic sketches, impersonations and parodies that have featured Rosenstock assuming the personae of Bertie Ahern, Ronan Keating, Colin Farrell and Roy Keane amongst many others; he also provides the manic voice of Right Price Tiles radio spokesperson "Daft Dave".

Rosenstock performed an impersonation of José Mourinho in a parody of a song from the musical Joseph and the Amazing Technicolor Dreamcoat. This spread on Internet message boards and eventually it was played on a Sky Sports broadcast. Mourinho had heard the song and enjoyed the impersonation so much he asked Rosenstock to perform a private show for him and the Chelsea squad. Rosenstock later released, with Mourinho's blessing, a single version of "José and his Amazing Technicolor Overcoat". He also released another song ("I Sign a Little Player or Two") on the internet with a parody of Mourinho in an interview then breaking into song.

In 2005, he starred as Keano in the comedy musical play I, Keano, which concerns Keane storming out of the Republic of Ireland national football squad during preparations for the 2002 FIFA World Cup.

In 2005, Rosenstock achieved the Christmas number one single in the Irish music Charts, with a parody of Will Young's song Leave Right Now (which itself was a Christmas number-one in 2003). The parody concerned Roy Keane's controversial departure from Manchester United and his falling-out with Alex Ferguson.

Between December 2007 and May 2009, Rosenstock worked on a puppet comedy series entitled Special 1 TV (originally I'm on Setanta Sports), which was presented as a parody weekly football talk show hosted by "José Mourinho". Rosenstock voiced all the puppet characters on the sketch, with the exception of "Rafael Benitez", who was performed by Keith Burke, including the main character Mourinho, his studio co-hosts "Sven-Göran Eriksson" and "Wayne Rooney", and regular phone-in callers like "Alex Ferguson", "Arsène Wenger", "Roy Keane" and "Mick McCarthy", as well as the non-football-related characters, Nelson Mandela, Willie Nelson, Barack Obama and Tom Cruise.

He won the Outstanding Achievement Award at the 11th annual PPI (Phonographic Performance Ireland) Radio Awards.

In November 2012, his new show called The Mario Rosenstock Show started on RTÉ2. A second series of the show began to air in September 2013.

His autobiography Gift Grub and Me is published by Merrion Press in September 2026.

== Family ==
Rosenstock is married, with two children. His uncle, Gabriel Rosenstock, was one of Ireland's most notable Irish language poets and member of INNTI with Michael Davitt (poet), Nuala Ní Dhomhnaill and Liam Ó Muirthile. Rosenstock's grandfather George was a doctor and writer from Schleswig-Holstein, Germany. He never spoke German again after the war out of shame. His grandmother was a nurse from Athenry, County Galway.

== Filmography ==
- Miracle at Midnight (The Walt Disney Company)
