= Today FM =

National commercial radio network in Ireland

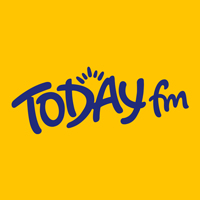
- Logo used since 2017
- Dublin; Ireland
- Broadcast area: Republic of Ireland; Leinster via DAB+
- Frequencies: DAB+: FáilteDAB; FM: 97.3–101.8, 105.5 MHz
- RDS: Today FM

Programming
- Format: Adult contemporary

Ownership
- Owner: Bauer Media Audio Ireland
- Sister stations: Newstalk; Dublin's 98FM; Spin 103.8; Spin South West; Cork's Red FM; iRadio

History
- First air date: 17 March 1997 as Radio Ireland. 1st January 1998 as Today FM.

Links
- Website: todayfm.com

Old logo

Today FM is an Irish commercial FM radio station, owned and operated by Bauer Media Audio Ireland Limited. Broadcasting since 17 March 1997, it broadcasts mostly music, with a daily news and current affairs programme. Today FM holds a licence from Coimisiún na Meán, with the current licence for the station running until 2027. The station recorded pretax profits of €7.4 million on a turnover of €19.4 million in early 2009, more than twice what it was two years previously.

Today FM broadcasts from studios in Marconi House, Digges Lane, Dublin 2. On 1 June 2021 Bauer Media Audio announced the completion of its acquisition of Communicorp Group in Ireland, including Today FM.

== Broadcast history ==
The station went on air, originally known as Radio Ireland, on St. Patrick's Day, 17 March 1997. At first, the station was a mixed network, airing much talk programming, including a farming show and various types of music, including traditional Irish, classical music, light opera. However, following six months of disastrous ratings, and with a listenership of just 1%, the station was revamped, and on 1 January 1998 became 100-102 Today FM. The station axed almost all of its programming and changed its music policy entirely. Eamon Dunphy's co-host (Anne-Marie Hourihan) was axed, with Dunphy being heavily promoted as a solo act and Ian Dempsey and Ray D'Arcy were poached from arch-rivals RTÉ. The IRTC went along with the schedule changes, though in a statement soon after the relaunch said it was not entirely satisfied with the new schedule. However, within three months, the station's listenership had almost doubled.

Today FM reshuffled its daytime schedule in 2004, reducing The Ian Dempsey Breakfast Show to add an extra hour to The Ray D'Arcy Show so that it could compete directly with rival, The Gerry Ryan Show. Phil Cawley's afternoon show was reduced and Tony Fenton was given a lunchtime show.

In April 2006, Ray D'Arcy conducted an interview with comedian Des Bishop. Bishop joked about being gay. D'Arcy asked Bishop to provide an "exclusive". Bishop said, "I'm gay... I'm not, but hey!" D'Arcy said, "You're very comfortable with your sexuality?" Bishop said, "Me and Derek Mooney are doing a show". The audience laughed. D'Arcy moved to a commercial break before, he said, Bishop "outs anyone else". The incident provoked much commentary in the media, with the Sunday Independent observing "Instantly, the Irish-American comedian was the villain of the piece and Derek was all over the front page", while Ray D'Arcy was also criticised for his choice of words.

On 29 February 2008, Matt Cooper's The Last Word was the final show to be presented from the old studios. The first show to be presented from the new Digges Lane studio was Friday Night 80s with Phil Cawley from 19:00. The first song played was "Welcome to the Pleasuredome" by Frankie Goes to Hollywood.

On 15 October 2011, Today FM confirmed Sam Smyth's Sunday radio show was being dropped. He had been presenting it for 14 years. Smyth had previously offended his bosses by commenting in a newspaper and on television about the Moriarty Tribunal, which criticised Today FM owner Denis O'Brien. Smyth said on air the next morning that he had been told not to talk about the end of his show and stopped one of his guests from talking about it too "before someone comes downstairs and pulls a wire we better move onto something else." The National Union of Journalists (NUJ) said it was concerned at the development. The Irish Independent, of which Denis O'Brien was a leading shareholder, reported that Anton Savage was being lined up to replace Sam Smyth. Eamon Dunphy subsequently resigned from Today FM's sister station Newstalk, in solidarity with Smyth and because, he said, the radio station's management wanted "dissenting voices" such as Constantin Gurdgiev off the airwaves.

Ray D'Arcy hosted the weekday mid-morning slot for 15 years but abruptly left Today FM to rejoin RTÉ with immediate effect in December 2014. Alison Curtis served as an interim host until the appointment of Anton Savage who began his show, The Anton Savage Show on 26 January 2015, which now airs every Monday to Friday from 9 am to midday. Savage's previous Sunday morning show, "Savage Sunday" which aired every Sunday from 11 am to 1 pm ended and the slot was taken over by comedian Neil Delamere who presented his own show titled "Neil Delamere's Sunday Best" which aired every Sunday from 11 am to 1 pm for a period of time.

On 17 August 2015, Colm O'Sullivan announced that his show The Mix-Up which had aired every Monday-Thursday 7-9 pm was ending after three years of being on-air and that O'Sullivan himself was retiring from the DJ business after nearly twenty years to take up a position as the new Programme Director of Today FM, O'Sullivan having joined Today FM in February 2013 with his show, "The Mix-Up" airing for the first time on Monday 4 February 2013.

Anton Savage left the radio station on 2 December 2016, and was replaced by Dermot Whelan and Dave Moore. On 25 January 2017, comedian Al Porter was announced, live on air, as the new host of the midday show, moving into Whelan and Moore's old slot. On 13 February 2017, Porter's show aired for the first time. However, in November 2017, after allegations of sexual misconduct made against Porter, he decided to resign from Today FM with immediate effect.

On Tuesday 1 June 2021, Bauer Media Audio announced the completion of its acquisition of Communicorp Group in Ireland, including Today FM.

On 30 October 2024, Ed Smith announced he was leaving the station, after 25 years.

Following the launch of FáilteDAB in 2025, TodayFM began broadcasting on DAB+ throughout Dublin and the wider Leinster area.

== See also ==
- Radio in the Republic of Ireland
