= The Live Album (Ham Sandwich album) =

Live album by Ham Sandwich
- Released: March 15, 2024
- Recorded: October 21, 2023
- Venue: Olympia Theatre
- Genre: Indie rock; Synth pop
- Label: Route 109A Records

Ham Sandwich chronology
Magnify (2022)	The Live Album (2024)

Professional ratings
Review scores
Source	Rating
Hot Press	9/10

The Live Album is the first live album from Irish rock band Ham Sandwich. It was recorded at the Olympia Theatre on 21 October 2023 at a concert to celebrate the band's 20th anniversary. It was released on 15 March 2024 via the band's own Route 109A Records label as a digital-only release. A planned vinyl release was cancelled after the manufacturing company went into liquidation a week before the planned release.

== Track listing ==
All tracks are written by Ham Sandwich

No.	Title	Original release	Length
1.	"St. Christopher"	Carry the Meek	2:29
2.	"Models"	White Fox	4:11
3.	"Keepsake"	Carry the Meek	3:48
4.	"Click...Click...Boom!"	Carry the Meek	4:06
5.	"Hold Me Up"	Stories from the Surface	4:32
6.	"White Fox"	White Fox	4:43
7.	"Electro-Wave"	Magnify	3:54
8.	"Apollo"	Stories from the Surface	4:33
9.	"In Perfect Rhymes"	Stories from the Surface	5:25
10.	"Fired Up"	Magnify	5:06
11.	"All Worthwhile"	Stories from the Surface	4:19
12.	"Ants"	White Fox	5:32
13.	"Never Talk"	Carry the Meek	5:17
14.	"Le Soleil"	Magnify	2:46
15.	"Illuminate"	Stories from the Surface	4:35
16.	"All My Blood"	Magnify	4:22
17.	"Bodies"	"Bodies"	6:12
18.	"The Naturist"	White Fox	6:05
Total length:			1:21:55

== Personnel ==
Ham Sandwich

- Niamh Farrell – lead vocals
- Podge McNamee – backing vocals, lead guitar
- Brian Darcy – backing vocals, lead guitar

Production

- Darren Clarke – engineer, mixing
- Danny Kalb – mastering
- Glen Bollard – photography
