= Marcata =

Studio album by The Minutes
- Released: 20 May 2011
- Recorded: Marcata Studios, Gardiner, New York
- Genre: Garage, Rock, Blues
- Length: 32:15
- Label: Model Citizen
- Producer: Kevin McMahon

The Minutes chronology
Marcata (2011)	Live Well, Change Often (2014)

Singles from Marcata
- 1. "Black Keys" Released: 2009; 2. "Secret History" Released: 2010; 3. "Fleetwood" Released: 2010; 4. "Black Keys" (re-release)" Released: 2011; 5. "Fleetwood" (re-release)" Released: 2011; 6. "Heartbreaker" Released: 2012

Marcata is an album by Irish rock band The Minutes. It was released on 20 May 2011 through Model Citizen Records.

In its first week of release, the album peaked at number 16 in the official Irish Albums Chart.

== Track listing ==
All songs written by The Minutes.

No.	Title	Length
1.	"Monster"	1:26
2.	"Black Keys"	3:40
3.	"Gold"	3:35
4.	"Fleetwood"	3:12
5.	"Believer"	3:02
6.	"Secret History"	1:45
7.	"Indian Wings"	0:30
8.	"Black and Blue"	4:19
9.	"Heartbreaker"	2:06
10.	"Guilt Quilt"	4:50
11.	"I.M.T.O.D."	4:39
12.	"Monsters"	1:11
Total length:		32:15

== Singles ==
Year	Title	Peak chart position	Album
Year	Title	IRL	Album
2009	"Black Keys"	—	Marcata
2010	"Secret History"	—	Marcata
2010	"Fleetwood"	—	Marcata
2011	"Black Keys" (re-release)	—	Marcata
2011	"Fleetwood" (re-release)	—	Marcata
2012	"Heartbreaker"	—	Marcata
"—" denotes a title that did not chart.

== Personnel ==
- Mark Austin - Lead vocals and rhythm guitar
- Tom Cosgrave - Bass and backing vocals
- Shane Kinsella - Drums and backing vocals
