= Christina Angelina =

American painter

Christina Angelina (Starfighter)
- Born: Santa Monica, California
- Known for: street art, muralism, collaborations
- Movement: street art, murals
- Website: www.christinaangelina.com

Christina Angelina also known as "Starfighter," is a Venice, Los Angeles-based visual artist, photographer and gallerist. Angelina is internationally renowned for her public art and large-scale figurative murals and was a featured artist in the Google Art Project's Street Art Collection launched in 2016. In 2016 Angelina was highlighted as among the most innovative artists to watch in Sleek Magazine. Angelina finished "Whitney Peak," a mural commissioned by the Whitney Peak Hotel in downtown Reno, Nevada.

== Early life ==
(Born in Santa Monica California but raised in Venice.) Angelina was surrounded by performers on the boardwalk, caricaturists creating sketches and muralists painting on walls in alleyways. Inspired by the creativity of the community, she began painting when she was a teenager, selling prints to friends and local art collectors. Angelina received a Bachelor of Fine Arts in art from UCLA in addition to studying animation at NYU's Tisch School of the Arts and photography at the Art Center College of Design. After graduating college, Angelina worked in a variety of media including drawing, painting and graphic design before homing in on street art and adopting the public persona "Starfighter".

== Murals ==
Deciding to be unconstrained by the rules and spatial limits of gallery, Angelina typically paints her figurative portraits on large-scale outdoor walls. The artist is known for her detailed, realistic murals that often depict female figures and explore the duality between strength and vulnerability and the power associated with both. In line with the site specific nature of street art, Angelina paints in settings and for communities that inspire her. In an effort to give back to these communities, Angelina conducts public lectures to discuss her work and the importance of establishing local connections.

Her murals are on walls throughout Los Angeles, ranging from neighborhoods such as South Central to Venice to the Downtown Arts District. Outside of Los Angeles, Angelina's work can be seen in cities that include: Berlin, Miami, Reno, New York City, Belfast and São Paulo.

In addition to urban cities, Angelina is inspired by abandoned locations that she can enliven with her work. For example, the artist collaborated with fellow muralist Ease One on an installation entitled "The Tank," located in an obscure desert setting called Slab City on the southern edge of the Salton Sea.

=== Collaborations ===
Angelina has collaborated with several muralists, street artists and graffiti writers including: Ease One, SEK, Hueman, Kevin Ledo, Spencer "Mar" Guilbert, Ana Marietta, and Fanakapan. She has also done some work on the project Branded Arts, working on enhancing working spaces.

=== Commercial installations ===
Angelina has received mural commissions from companies such as Nike, Nylon Magazine, Heineken and Microsoft, and did a live painting installation for the musician Kaskade to promote his album Fire & Ice. In 2012, Angelina completed several paintings and window dressings exclusively for Christian Louboutin at Neiman Marcus in Beverly Hills, which have since become part of the department store's permanent collection. Also in 2012, she designed the cover art for Rodrigo y Gabriela's album Area 52 and appeared in the music video "Eyes Like Pearls" by Van Hunt from the album What Were You Hoping For?.

=== Burning Man ===
The Burning Man annual gathering at Black Rock City, Nevada has played a significant role in Angelina's career and was where she got the name "Starfighter:" initially a reference to her outfit but also a commentary on her role as a strong female within the predominantly male-driven art world. Apart from being a Burning Man participant for over 14 years, Angelina has created large installations at the gathering starting in 2004.

=== Whitney Peak Mural ===
The Whitney Peak mural was completed in June 2015. It was commissioned by the Whitney Peak Hotel for display on the side of the hotel, and features a hooded woman modeled by with long dark hair, modeled by MaeMae Renfrow. The Whitney Peak mural was completed during the inaugural Sculpture Fest in Reno. Being in the center of the city and across from the Reno Arch, the mural is also known as the "Face of Reno." Standing at 80'x35', the mural took three days to install, and the installation process endured 30 mph winds. The commissioned work was done entirely in blue and silver spray paint, and is also Angelina's tallest solo work.
