= 11:11 (Rodrigo y Gabriela album) =

Studio album by Rodrigo y Gabriela
- Released: 2 September 2009
- Length: 45:39
- Label: Rubyworks
- Producers: Rodrigo Sánchez, except "11:11", produced by John Leckie and Rodrigo y Gabriela

Rodrigo y Gabriela chronology
Live in Japan (2008)	11:11 (2009)	Live in France (2011)

Professional ratings
Aggregate scores
Source	Rating
Metacritic	81/100
Review scores
Source	Rating
AllMusic	4.5/5 stars
Billboard	4/5 stars
The Guardian	4/5 stars
Mojo	4/5 stars
musicOMH	3.5/5 stars
NME	7/10
Paste	8.1/10
Q	4/5 stars
Spin	2.5/5 stars
Under the Radar	6/10

11:11 is the third studio album by Mexican guitar duo Rodrigo y Gabriela. It was released on independent label Rubyworks around the world from 2 to 8 September 2009. It guest stars Strunz & Farah on the song "Master Maqui" and Alex Skolnick on the song "Atman". The song "Buster Voodoo" was performed by the band on The Tonight Show hosted by Conan O'Brien on 1 October 2009 and on The Late Late Show with Craig Ferguson on 28 October 2009. Each song on the album is a tribute to an artist that inspired both Rodrigo and Gabriela.

The song "Santo Domingo" was chosen as the Starbucks iTunes Pick of the Week for 10 November 2009.

== Track listing ==
All music is composed by Rodrigo y Gabriela.

No.	Title	Dedicated to	Length
1.	"Hanuman"	Carlos Santana	3:43
2.	"Buster Voodoo"	Jimi Hendrix	4:24
3.	"Triveni"	Le Trio Joubran	3:55
4.	"Logos"	Al Di Meola	2:50
5.	"Santo Domingo"	Michel Camilo	4:02
6.	"Master Maqui" (featuring Strunz & Farah)	Paco de Lucía	5:05
7.	"Savitri"	Shakti	3:46
8.	"Hora Zero"	Ástor Piazzolla	5:24
9.	"Chac Mool"	Jorge Reyes	1:51
10.	"Atman" (featuring Alex Skolnick)	Dimebag Darrell	5:50
11.	"11:11"	Pink Floyd	4:49
Total length:			45:39

== Personnel ==
Rodrigo y Gabriela

- Rodrigo Sánchez – acoustic guitar, ukulele, oud, cajón
- Gabriela Quintero – acoustic guitar, ukulele, oud, darbuka

Additional performers

- Jorge Strunz – acoustic guitar solo (right channel) on "Master Maqui"
- Ardeshir Farah – acoustic guitar solo (left channel) on "Master Maqui"
- Alex Skolnick – electric guitar solo on "Atman"
- Edgardo Pineda Sanchez – piano on "11:11"

Production

- Produced by Rodrigo Sánchez, except "11:11", produced by John Leckie and Rodrigo y Gabriela
- Mixed by Colin Richardson
- Mix engineer – Matt Hyde
- Recording engineer and production assistant – Fermin Vazquez Llera
- Additional engineering by Brian Wilson at Musikbox, and Martyn "Ginge" Ford and Jeff Rose at Nott-In-Pill Studios, Newport, UK
- Mix coordination by Lora Richardson
- Mastered by Robyn Robins

== Charts ==
Chart performance for 11:11
Chart (2009)	Peak position
Australian Albums (ARIA)	80
Austrian Albums (Ö3 Austria)	70
Belgian Albums (Ultratop Flanders)	12
Belgian Albums (Ultratop Wallonia)	27
French Albums (SNEP)	20
Irish Albums (IRMA)	9
Swiss Albums (Schweizer Hitparade)	55
UK Albums (Official Charts)	46
