= The Ambience Affair =

Irish band

Background information
- Origin: Dublin, Ireland
- Years active: 2009–present
- Label: Bluestack Records
- Members: Jamie Clarke, Marc Gallagher, Yvonne Ryan
- Website: theambienceaffair.com

The Ambience Affair are an Irish band from Dublin who formed in 2009. The band consists of vocalist and lead guitarist Jamie Clarke, drummer Marc Gallagher, and bass player Yvonne Ryan.

== History ==
Jamie (vocals, guitar) and Marc (drums) first met while working in a music shop in Dublin. At the time, Jamie had started playing his one man-show in various clubs around town and one evening Marc came along to one of his shows. After a few initial practice sessions, their sound developed over the following two years which saw the release of Fragile Things (2009) and Patterns (2010) to much critical acclaim. The track "Parting Patterns" from their Patterns EP was used on US TV show, CSI: NY.

The Ambience Affair's signature sound comprises layered looped guitars, keyboards and driving bass rhythms. Bassist Yvonne Ryan joined the band in late 2010. Yvonne had first seen the band play at Hard Working Class Heroes and was soon joining them on stage as they supported the likes of Lower Dens, Field Music, Peter Broderick, Lisa Hannigan, Jape, Villagers and Bell X1.

The band signed to Bluestack Records in summer 2011 where they released their debut album Burials, in October 2011. Following a successful album launch tour that October, the band were invited to join Mercury Prize nominee Lisa Hannigan on her Irish Tour in December 2011.

The Ambience Affair made their Irish Television debut in 2012 on Other Voices.

== Awards ==
The Ambience Affair have collaborated with Dublin-based film production company Souljacker on a number of music videos. Their video for The Ambience Affair's track "Devil in the Detail", won both the 'Video of the Year' and 'Most Original Concept' Award at the 2010 Irish Music Television Awards.

== Discography ==
=== Albums ===
- Burials (14 October 2011)

=== EPs ===
- Patterns (2010)
- Fragile Things (2009)

=== Singles ===
- "The Fallen" (14 October 2011)
