= Mettavolution =

Studio album by Rodrigo y Gabriela
- Released: 26 April 2019
- Length: 41:11
- Label: Rubyworks; ATO
- Producer: Dave Sardy

Rodrigo y Gabriela chronology
| 9 Dead Alive (2014) | Mettavolution (2019) | In Between Thoughts...A New World (2023) |

Professional ratings
Aggregate scores
| Source | Rating |
|---|---|
| Metacritic | 73/100 |
Review scores
| Source | Rating |
| AllMusic | 4/5 stars |
| Pitchfork | 7.1/10 |

Mettavolution is the fifth studio album by Mexican duo Rodrigo y Gabriela. It was released on 26 April 2019 through Rubyworks and ATO Records.

== Critical reception ==
Mettavolution received generally favorable reviews from contemporary music critics. At Metacritic, which assigns a normalised rating out of 100 to reviews from mainstream critics, the album received an average score of 73, based on 6 reviews.

It won the award for Best Contemporary Instrumental Album at the 2020 Grammy Awards.

== Track listing ==
All tracks are written by Gabriela Quintero & Rodrigo Sánchez except where noted.

| No. | Title | Writer(s) | Length |
|---|---|---|---|
| 1. | "Mettavolution" | | 4:04 |
| 2. | "Terracentric" | | 3:33 |
| 3. | "Cumbé" | | 3:19 |
| 4. | "Electric Soul" | | 3:58 |
| 5. | "Krotona Days" | | 4:19 |
| 6. | "Witness Tree" | | 3:01 |
| 7. | "Echoes" | David Gilmour, Nick Mason, Roger Waters, Richard Wright | 18:57 |
| Total length: | | | 40:11 |

== Charts ==
| Chart (2019) | Peak position |
|---|---|
| Belgian Albums (Ultratop Flanders) | 199 |
| Belgian Albums (Ultratop Wallonia) | 157 |
| French Albums (SNEP) | 79 |
| German Albums (Offizielle Top 100) | 73 |
| Scottish Albums (OCC) | 19 |
| Swiss Albums (Schweizer Hitparade) | 95 |
| UK Albums (OCC) | 46 |
| UK Americana Albums (OCC) | 4 |
| UK Independent Albums (OCC) | 8 |
| US Billboard 200 | 71 |
| US Americana/Folk Albums (Billboard) | 3 |
| US Independent Albums (Billboard) | 4 |
| US Top Rock Albums (Billboard) | 7 |
| US World Albums (Billboard) | 2 |
