= Live in Japan (Rodrigo y Gabriela album) =

Live album by Rodrigo y Gabriela
- Released: 17 October 2008
- Label: Rubyworks
- Producer: Rodrigo y Gabriela

Rodrigo y Gabriela chronology
Rodrigo y Gabriela (2006)	Live in Japan (2008)	11:11 (2009)

Professional ratings
Review scores
Source	Rating
AllMusic	3.5/5 stars
Pinpoint Music	4.0/5

Live in Japan is the second live album by Mexican guitar duo Rodrigo y Gabriela. It was released on independent label Rubyworks Records on 17 October 2008 and 20 October in Ireland and the UK, respectively. The album captures Rodrigo & Gabriela making their live Japanese debut, at Tokyo's Duo club on 30 March 2008.

== Track listing ==
All music is composed by Rodrigo y Gabriela, except where noted.

No.	Title	Writer(s)	Length
1.	"OK Tokyo"		5:42
2.	"Juan Loco"		5:53
3.	"Orion"	James Hetfield, Lars Ulrich, Cliff Burton	2:58
4.	"Foc"		10:43
5.	"Satori"		5:31
6.	"Ixtapa"		5:43
7.	"Vikingman"		3:53
8.	"Take Five"	Paul Desmond	5:18
9.	"One"	Hetfield, Ulrich	5:04
10.	"Gabriela Solo"		4:19
11.	"Rodrigo Solo"		3:29
12.	"Stairway to Heaven"	Jimmy Page, Robert Plant	5:19
13.	"Tamacun"		6:18
14.	"Diablo Rojo"		5:34

== Personnel ==
Rodrigo y Gabriela

- Rodrigo Sánchez – acoustic guitar
- Gabriela Quintero – acoustic guitar

Production

- Produced by Rodrigo y Gabriela
- Engineered by Yujiro Saito
- Mixed by Naoto Tanemura
- Mastered by Mitsuyasu Abe
- Executive producers – Sach Tsuchiya and Masami Yamamoto
- Product manager – Koichi Kanematsu
- Front cover design by Jam Suzuki
- Front cover and booklet photo by Ryota Mori
- Back cover photo by Tina Korhonen
