= Ryan Sheridan (musician) =

Irish singer-songwriter

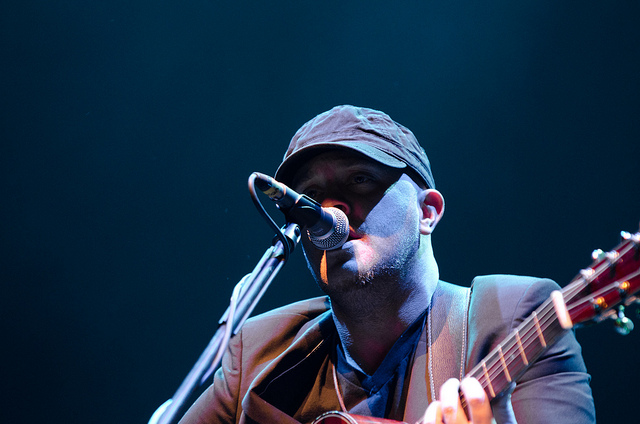
- Ryan Sheridan at The O2, Dublin in March 2011

Background information
- Genre: Rock/Pop
- Occupations: Singer; songwriter; musician
- Instruments: Vocals; guitar; piano
- Years active: 2010-present
- Label: Rubyworks • Universal
- Website: ryansheridan.com

Ryan Sheridan is an Irish singer, songwriter and musician.

== Early life ==
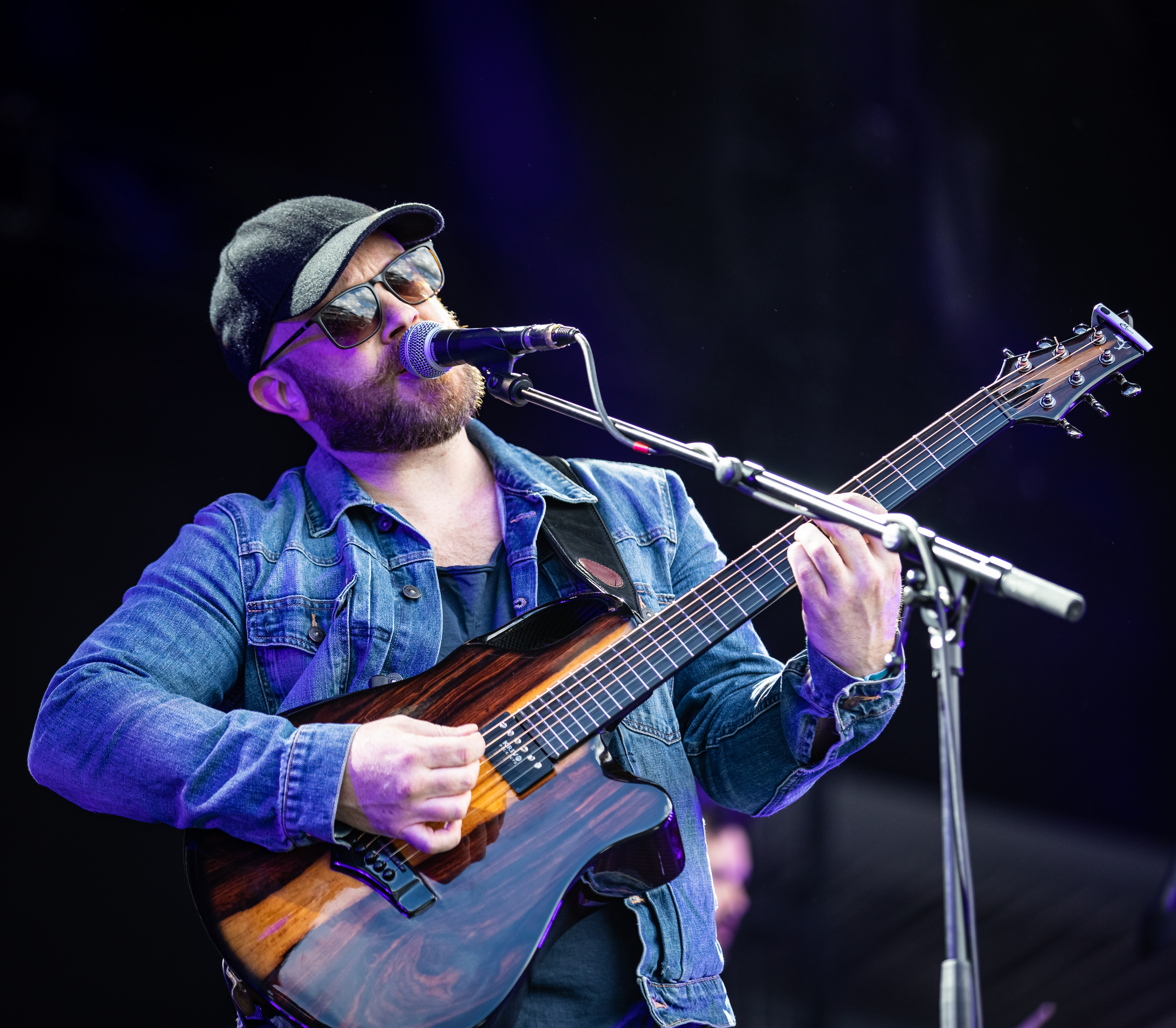
Ryan Sheridan live at Rock am Ring 2019.

Ryan Sheridan’s musical roots trace back to his childhood in Monaghan, where he began playing the fiddle at seven and performed traditional Irish music with Comhaltas. His sound evolved significantly after relocating to New York as a teenager, where he immersed himself in songwriting and developed a distinctive, percussive guitar style. Influenced by the energy of the city and his experiences touring with Riverdance, Sheridan began blending his Irish traditional roots with rhythmic guitar work and a melodic edge. This fusion laid the foundation for a solo career defined by dynamic live performances and a unique sound.

== Music career ==
In March 2010, while performing on Dublin’s Grafton Street alongside percussionist Artur Graczyk, Ryan Sheridan caught the attention of music manager Brian Whitehead, who stopped to listen and quietly placed his card in Sheridan’s guitar case. Soon after, Sheridan’s original track “Machine” was submitted to the SupaJam competition, which gave unsigned artists the chance to perform at the Festival Internacional de Benicàssim in Spain. Out of over 3,200 entries, Sheridan won first place and performed on the Eastpak FIB Club Stage on 17 July 2010, a milestone that marked the beginning of his professional recording career.

Following a successful showcase at The Academy in Dublin, Ryan Sheridan signed a record deal with Rubyworks Records. His debut single, “Jigsaw”, produced by Billy Farrell, was released in September 2010 and quickly gained momentum on Irish radio and iTunes, earning widespread attention. That same year, Sheridan embarked on his first headline tour across Ireland. He also featured on RTÉ Two’s acclaimed music series Other Voices, with two songs from his performance later released on the compilation album Other Voices: Series 9, Vol. 3 (Live) in August 2013.

=== 2011–2014 ===
2011 - Ryan Sheridan’s breakthrough year opened with a performance on The Late Late Show on 21 January. On 6 May, he released his debut album The Day You Live Forever through Rubyworks Records, later licensed to Universal Music Germany. Featuring the singles “Jigsaw,” “The Dreamer,” and “Stand Up Tall,” the album debuted at No. 2 on the Irish Albums Chart, reached gold status within five weeks, and was later certified platinum. Produced by Joe Chester and written entirely by Sheridan, the album's success led to his invitation as a special guest on Rea Garvey’s European tour.

Throughout 2011, Sheridan supported several major international acts. In early March, he performed as the opening act for The Script at Dublin’s O2 Arena, followed shortly after by a support slot for Taylor Swift on 27 March during her Speak Now tour, playing to a sold-out audience of 16,000. Later in the year, he also supported Bryan Adams at the same venue, further cementing his presence on arena stages.

In May, Sheridan performed at the College Green Concert for President Barack Obama, and on 17 September, became the first artist to play both Croke Park and the Aviva Stadium on the same day. He returned to Croke Park the following afternoon to perform during the 2011 All-Ireland Senior Football Championship Final. His largest Dublin headline show to date followed at The Academy on 5 November, featuring guest appearances from Crowded House bassist Nick Seymour and guitarist Tomas Cosinski.

Later that year, as an ambassador for Make-A-Wish Ireland, Sheridan released a four-track Christmas EP titled Walking in the Air on 25 November. The title track, a heartfelt cover of the classic song originally written by Howard Blake for the 1982 animated film The Snowman, became a seasonal favourite in Ireland. It reached the Irish Top 10 and hit No. 1 on iTunes on 23 December, the same day as Sheridan’s return to The Late Late Show. The single remains a staple on Irish radio during the Christmas season. That same month, the video for “Stand Up Tall,” directed by Simon Eustace, was nominated for Best Male Video at the 2011 IMTV Awards.

2012 - In early 2012, Ryan Sheridan’s profile continued to rise. His track “Take It All Back” from The Day You Live Forever was featured in the opening episode of Season 4 of RTÉ’s TV drama Raw, while another single, “The Dreamer,” was used as the soundtrack to a national Heineken commercial. Around this time, guitarist Nicky Brennan joined Sheridan’s live band, expanding the sound of his live performances.

In March, Sheridan appeared on Irish boxing champion, Bernard Dunne’s Bród Club on RTÉ, performing an Irish-language version of “The Day You Live Forever”. On 20 April, during a sold-out headline show at The Olympia Theatre in Dublin, he was presented with a platinum plaque in recognition of his debut album’s success. That summer, Sheridan played his first London show at the Hard Rock Calling festival in Hyde Park (15 July)

On 1 November 2012, Sheridan signed a major international deal with Universal Music Germany, expanding his reach across Europe. He closed out the year with headline appearances at Monroe’s in Galway on 22 November, followed by a performance at Monto Water Rats in London

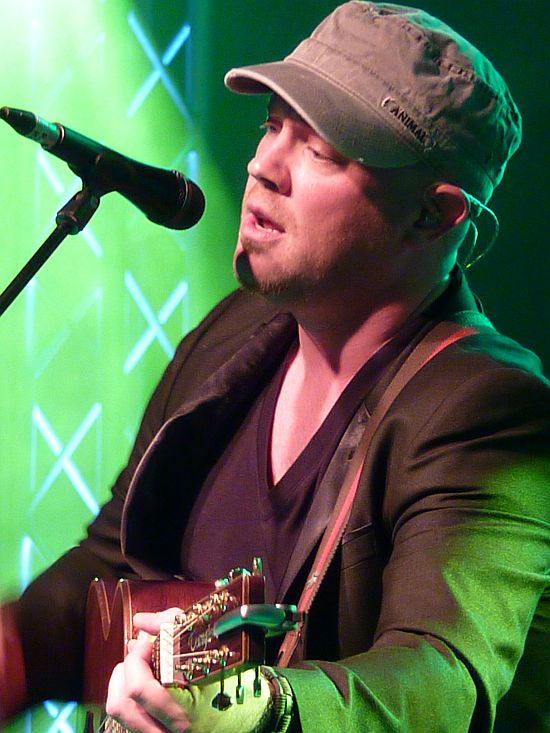
Ryan Sheridan (2013)

2013 - Ryan Sheridan kicked off the year with an intensive touring schedule in Germany, serving as a special guest to Rea Garvey in January and February, and later supporting the German rock band Silly in May, drawing a total audience of around 60,000 across Europe. His track “The Dreamer”, from The Day You Live Forever, was also featured on The Hardy Bucks Movie soundtrack, which debuted in Ireland on 22 February. In April, Sheridan refreshed his live ensemble, bringing Nicky Brennan (guitar), Jimmy Rainsford (drums), and Tanya O’Callaghan (bass) to the lineup. The group premiered Sheridan's new single “Upside Down” on The Late Late Show on 12 April. Shortly after, on 26 April, The Day You Live Forever was reissued in Germany via Universal Music Germany, featuring two bonus tracks: “Upside Down” and “Without You.” The re-release quickly soared to No. 1 on the German iTunes chart, becoming the highest charting debut album by an international artist on Germany’s official charts by mid‑2013. Sheridan’s live profile also expanded on television: he performed “Jigsaw” alongside winner Keith Hanley on The Voice of Ireland final on 28 April, and made his German television debut on Sat.1’s morning show on 3 May.

Personnel changes followed in May when longtime cajón player Artur Graczyk departed and was formally replaced by drummer Jimmy Rainsford; around the same time, Sean Brennan joined on bass. Sheridan then launched his first headlining German tour, running from 7 to 29 October, with a standout performance at The Capitol in Hanover.

The final months of his whirlwind year included a November 1 set at Rugby legend Brian O'Driscoll'stestimonial dinner in Dublin, and Sheridan’s song “Awake” was featured on the charity compilation Simple Things for Cycle Against Suicide, released on 15 November. He rounded off the year headlining Dublin’s New Year’s Eve Countdown Concert at College Green.

2014 - Ryan Sheridan continued to build momentum both at home and abroad. He began the year with the release of Ryan Sheridan Live in Cologne, a live EP showcasing his energetic performances for his growing fan base in Germany. His Day You Live Forever tour resumed in February, beginning at The Capitol in Mannheim and concluding at Berlin’s Postbahnhof in March. Following the tour, bassist Sean Brennan departed the band and was replaced by Darren Sweeney. In April, Sheridan and his band travelled to the Middle East to perform at the Bahrain Irish Festival, and later that month returned to Germany to take part in Pop Meets Classic in Braunschweig, performing for 6,000 attendees alongside a 75-piece orchestra. That summer, Sheridan wrote and recorded the track “Home” for Mrs Brown’s Boys D’Movie. The accompanying video featured a collection of Irish celebrities and expatriates, including Niall Horan, Robbie Keane, and Saoirse Ronan, sharing what they missed about Ireland. The single was released through Rubyworks on 8 August 2014 and received strong national radio support. Later that year, Sheridan followed up with the release of another original single, “2 Back to 1,” further establishing his reputation as a songwriter with both commercial appeal and emotional depth.

=== 2015–2019 ===
2015 - On 26 April 2015, Ryan Sheridan performed his new single “Here and Now”, the title track from his forthcoming second album, during the Voice of Ireland Season 4 final. Later that summer, he took to the stage at the Munster Senior Football Final between Kerry and Cork on 18 July. His follow-up single “Hearsay” gained strong radio traction and entered the Top 20 of the Irish Airplay Chart.

In August, Sheridan returned to Germany for live performances in Luhmühlen and Wolfsburg, before officially releasing his second studio album Here and Now in Ireland on 28 August through Rubyworks Records. The album debuted at No. 1 on the Irish Albums Chart, overtaking The Weeknd’s Beauty Behind the Madness in its release week.

To support the release, Sheridan launched the Here and Now Tour, beginning with a headline show at Whelan’s in Dublin on 28 August. The Irish leg was followed by a 16-date tour across Germany, kicking off in Hamburg on 12 November, further expanding his presence in Europe.

== Discography ==
=== Albums ===
- The Day You Live Forever (6 May 2011) No. 2
- Here And Now (28 August 2015) No. 1
- Americana (2022)
- Live At Rockpalast Crossroads Festival 2023 (2024)

=== EPs ===
- Walking in the Air (25 November 2011)
- Ryan Sheridan Live in Cologne (14 February 2014) Germany
- Ryan Sheridan (2018)
- Spark EP (2019)
- Undercover (2024)

=== Singles ===
- "Jigsaw" (10 September 2010) IRE No. 11
- "The Dreamer" (15 April 2011) IRE No. 25
- "Walking in the Air" (25 November 2011) IRE No. 7
- "Stand Up Tall" (UK Radio Edit, 1 June 2012)
- "Upside Down" (12 April 2013) IRE No. 22
- "Home" (2014)
- "2 Back To 1" (12 December 2014)
- "Here and Now" (29 May 2015)
- "All of It" (2017)
- "Frozen in Time" (2017)
- "Walk Away" (2019)
- "Call My Name" (2020)
- "Kick Me When I’m Down" (2020)
- "Rock Salt & Nails" (2020)
- "When The Leaves Come Falling Down" (2020)
- "Fine Wine" (2021)
- "Seven Nation Army" (2022)
- "Time" (20. Oktober 2023)

== Live band ==
=== Current members ===
- Ryan Sheridan - Vocals, Guitar, Piano (2010–Present)
- Colm Lyndsey – Electric guitar, backing Vocals (2024–Present)

=== Former Members ===
- Ronan Nolan – Drums, percussion (2015–2024)
- Nicky Brennan – Electric guitar, backing vocals (2012–2017)
- Darren Sweeney – Bass guitar, backing vocals, keys (2014–2017)
- Jimmy Rainsford – Drums, percussion, cajón (2013–2015)
- Sean Brennan – Bass guitar, backing vocals (2013–2014)
- Artur Graczyk – Percussion, cajón (2010–2013)

== Touring ==
Since the release of Jigsaw, Sheridan has been touring extensively across Ireland, Germany and the rest of Europe. In 2015 he also added Australia to his touring list.
