= Area 52 (album) =

Studio album by Rodrigo y Gabriela/C.U.B.A.
- Released: 23 January 2012
- Genres: Acoustic; folk
- Length: 53:57
- Labels: Rubyworks (Ireland); ATO (US)
- Producers: Rodrigo Sánchez and Peter Asher

Rodrigo y Gabriela chronology
Live in France (2009)	Area 52 (2012)	9 Dead Alive (2014)

Professional ratings
Aggregate scores
Source	Rating
Metacritic	73/100
Review scores
Source	Rating
AllMusic	4/5 stars
Consequence of Sound	3.5/5 stars
Drowned in Sound	6/10 stars
Sputnikmusic	2.5/5

Area 52 is a 2012 album by acoustic duo Rodrigo y Gabriela and the Cuban orchestra known as C.U.B.A. It is Rodrigo y Gabriela's fifth album overall, and their first collaboration with another group. Their aim was to "do our music with a Cuban orchestra that plays in a very traditional way, a fusion". All the songs on this album are re-recordings of songs previously released in their previous two studio albums. The duo spent 20 days recording in Cuba where "the pianist also made the arrangements for the orchestra. We'd play along with the musicians so they could hear our energy". Afterwards, the band overdubbed solo parts at their own studio.

== Track listing ==
All music is composed by Rodrigo y Gabriela.

No.	Title	Length
1.	"Santo Domingo" (with Samuel Folmell Alfonso)	6:31
2.	"Hanuman" (with John Tempesta)	5:33
3.	"Ixtapa" (with Anoushka Shankar)	8:11
4.	"11:11" (with Carles Benavent & Carlota Teresa Polledo Noriega)	7:30
5.	"Master Maqui" (with Le Trio Joubran)	5:13
6.	"Diablo Rojo"	5:09
7.	"Logos"	4:46
8.	"Juan Loco" (with Carles Benavent)	4:09
9.	"Tamacun" (with John Tempesta)	6:55

== Personnel ==
Rodrigo y Gabriela

- Rodrigo Sánchez – acoustic guitar
- Gabriela Quintero – acoustic guitar

C.U.B.A.

- Lazaro A. Oviedo Dilou – trumpet
- Edouardo J. Sandoval Ferrer – trombone
- Cesar Alejandro Lopez Martinez – saxophone
- Ariel Sarduy Mena – violin
- Anolan Gonzalez Morejon – viola
- Feliciano Arango Noa – bass
- Irving Roberto Frontelo Rico – violin
- Alex Wilson piano, musical director
- Otto Santana Selis – cajón, drums, percussion
- Jorge Leliebre Sorzano- flute
- Juan Kemell Barrera Toledo – trumpet
- Rene Suarez Zapata – percussion

Featured Artists

- Samuel Folmell Alfonso – drums
- John Tempesta – drums
- Anoushka Shankar – sitar
- Carles Benavent – bass
- Carlota Teresa Polledo Noriega – vocals
- Le Trio Joubran – oud

Production

- Rodrigo Sánchez – production
- Peter Asher – production
- Rafa Sardina – mixing
- Robyn Robins – mastering
- Jorge Gabriel "Benny" Benitez Herrera – engineering
- Nathaniel Kunkel – engineering
- Nicolas Rosemond – engineering
- Neil Williams – engineering
- Alex Wilson – arrangements
- Samantha Lopez – photography
- Niall Muckian – photography
- Christina Angelina – cover art
