= Lily of the Valley (disambiguation) =

Lily of the valley is a flowering plant.

Lily of the Valley or Lilies of the Valley may also refer to:

== Literature ==
- Lily of the Valley (novel), a French novel
- Lily of the Valley (play), a 1942 play by Ben Hecht

== Music ==
- Lily of da Valley, a 2001 album by Dragon Ash
- Lily of the Valley (album), a 2012 album by Funeral Suits
- "The Lily of the Valley", a Christian hymn, covered by Johnny Cash
- "Lily of the Valley" (song), a 1974 song by Queen
- "Lily of the Valley", a song by Marty Robbins from the B-side of "I Walk Alone"
- "Lily of the Valley", a song by Shenandoah from the B-side of "See If I Care"
- "Lily of the Valley", a song by George Jones from Old Brush Arbors 1965
- "Landyshi" (Ландыши/Lily of the Valley), a 1959 song by Gelena Velikanova
- "Lilies of the Valley" (Ландыши), a song by composer Oscar Feltsman
- "Lilies of the Valley", a song by David Byrne from David Byrne

== Other uses ==
- Lilies of the Valley (Fabergé egg), a jewelled Fabergé egg
- Lilies of the Valley, twin islands on Lake Windemere
- Lily of the Valley (horse), a racehorse
- Lily of the Valley (boat), a houseboat owned by Canadian pioneer John Moore Robinson

== See also ==
- Lily of the valley tree
- Lily of the valley vine, Salpichroa origanifolia
- Lily of the Alley, 1924 film
