= IMTV =

IMTV may refer to:

- Intermountain Television, branding of local programming aired over CBWST in Dauphin, Manitoba in the 1980s and 1990s
- Irish Music Television Awards
