= Pearse McGloughlin =

Irish singer-songwriter

Pearse McGloughlin is a songwriter and artist from Sligo, Ireland. He has released five studio albums; Busy Whisper (2009), In Movement (2012) and Idiot Songs (2013) which was a concept album based on Fyodor Dostoevsky's 'The Idiot' in collaboration with composer Justin Grounds. McGloughlin draws on literary and philosophical influences in his work. His aesthetic is described as atmospheric or ethereal. McGloughlin released 'The Soft Animal' in 2016 under the artist name of 'Nocturnes'. ‘The Rest’ was released in 2020.

== Albums ==
=== Busy Whisper ===
Busy Whisper was Pearse's debut album and was released in July 2009. It was recorded by Andy Knightley, Karl Odlum and Pearse McGloughlin. Busy Whisper was described by the Irish Times as "…soft-focused, mellow tunes delivered with quietly assured authority…" and received a 3 star review. Busy Whisper featured in session on RTÉ 2FM. Harry Guerin of RTÉ gave the album a 4 star rating. Cluas music website stated that "Busy Whisper is exactly the sort of album that should see the LP survive as a format a stunningly good debut album that showcases Pearse McGloughlin as one of Ireland's brightest musical prospects." Subba Cultcha UK wrote that Busy Whisper was "an awesome first outing from a very exciting and talented individual 4/5" Terrascope Online wrote that Busy Whisper was 'well crafted' and 'lyrically intelligent' AU Magazine wrote Busy Whisper is "an album that revels in an unabashed intimacy and raw tenderness - 8/10" 2UIBestow music blog also rated the album highly likening McGloughlin to Glen Hansard and Slowdive

=== In Movement ===
In Movement was engineered by producer Jimmy Eadie and saw McGloughlin working closely with his band Nocturnes (Enda Roche, Christophe Capewell, Seán Lynch and Sweeney Lee). It was released in June 2012. The song ‘Bright Star’ referenced Romantic poet John Keats while ‘Spherosphere’ makes reference to Carson McCullers ‘The Heart Is A Lonely Hunter’.

Music critic Jim Carroll of The Irish Times referred to the album as "...another album for the wee small hours, a place he seems comfortable (...) a set of songs that, confidently and astutely, carry McGloughlin further along an upwards trajectory’’.

The album was reviewed by RTÉ journalist Harry Guerin who wrote "While it would be hard for anything to make up for the damp and defeats of this summer, here's one guy who's really trying his best..." He awarded the album a four star review. The album was featured in session on national radio on RTÉ Radio One and on shows such as Dublin's 98FM Totally Irish.

Terrascope UK said In Movement was ‘a really good album showcasing the talent of this songwriter..."

Eamonn Carr of the Evening Herald wrote that "McGloughlin's accomplished schtick is quiet and whispery. Instead of sweeping you off your feet like a tidal wave, this music announces itself by lapping in around your ankles’.

2UIBestow gave a generally positive review of the album but stated that some songs 'struggle to shine'.

Irish music magazine, Hot Press said the album was ‘a quiet triumph’ and awarded In Movement a 7 out of 10 rating.

=== Idiot Songs ===
Idiot Songs was a collaboration with composer Justin Grounds. It was a concept album which was a reworking of Fyodor Dosteovsky’s 'The Idiot’. The album was released in August 2013. The duo dubbed the album ‘electronic chamber music’. The album was written in different studios in Canada, Cork and Dublin. Grounds and McGloughlin sent the files to one another over the internet. Tony Clayton Lea of The Irish Times awarded it a four star review; he stated that it was "a series of sonic gems (gifted with beats and beautifully spectral spoken-word inserts) that breathe life and art into electronic music’.

Irish music blogger Nialler9 also awarded it Album of the Week in August 2013. "Over 34 minutes, the pair, with help from Enda Roche, create what the best albums manage to do, an atmosphere exclusive to itself with its own identity. By indebting the project to Dostoevsky and partnering up, McGloughlin and Grounds have made an album greater than their two talents. No idiots here."

Blog Harmless Noise wrote that Idiot Songs was "a beautiful homage to the empathy and creativity of Dostoyevsky and without a doubt one of the best concept albums I’ve heard in my time…"

The song ‘Jung Trickster’ from the album was included in the Global Bloggers Mixtape as the Irish representative song for August 2013.

The Across the Line programme on BBC Radio Ulster wrote:“Taking from the duo’s new full-length, self-titled release – a concept album borne from a mutual love of the literary works of Dostoyevsky, composed and constructed via Dropbox – ‘Nastasya’s Tears’ is a beautifully executed, impressively constructed track instantly calling to mind the likes of Villagers, Death Cab For Cutie and – another Ben Gibbard project – The Postal Service.”

Jonathan Klein of Irish music website Goldenplec wrote of the album: “‘Idiot Songs’ is a powerful and expressive work of art, and at just over half an hour long, does not overstay its welcome. Combining electronic percussion with more traditional instruments, ‘electronic chamber music’ could not be a more accurate description of the unique and frankly bizarre use of instruments that features throughout ‘Idiot Songs’.

Idiot Songs appeared on End of Year Lists from Dan Hegarty and Nialler9. Idiot Songs featured on Irish national radio on arts programmes such as RTÉ Radio 1's Arena and on BBC Radio Ulster's The Arts Show.

The Thin Air placed 'Nastasya's Tears' by Idiot Songs at number 3 in its 'Top 100 Songs of 2013' list.

=== The Soft Animal by Nocturnes ===
'The Soft Animal' was released in 2016 on Bluestack Records. The record featured contributions from long time collaborator Enda Roche, Christophe Capewell and Adrian Crowley. The album was placed in Dan Hegarty's Top 20 Irish Albums of 2016.

=== Video ===
Pearse’s works often with his brother Kevin McGloughlin, visual artist and videographer. The video for ‘Ways to Kill a Werewolf’ from ‘Busy Whisper’ was directed by Kevin and was given an IMTV Award for Best Male Video in 2009. Kevin also directed ‘Villages of Ether’ for Idiot Songs (2013). This was awarded a Staff Pick on video sharing website Vimeo.

Pearse has also produced and directed videos for artists in Urchin Collective; Enda Reilly, Fia Rua, Vespertine Quintet. Pearse co-directed Idiot Songs video ‘Devils’ with his brother Kevin. Pearse’s short video ‘Though Small We Count Not For Less’ appeared at the Galway Film Festival in 2011.

=== Awards ===
Irish Music TV Award: Best Male Video (2009). Director: Kevin McGloughlin

=== Festivals ===
Pearse has performed at Other Voices TV Show Music Trail (with Idiot Songs ), HWCH, Body and Soul Festival, Another Love Story, Electric Picnic, Knockanstockan, Fading Light Festival, First Fortnight, Castlepalooza, Best of IMRO Showcase.

=== Discography ===
Busy Whisper (2009) LP (Urchin Music)
Twine (2010) EP (Urchin Music)
Bright Star (Single) 2012 In Movement (2012) LP (Urchin Music)
Idiot Songs (2013) LP (Urchin Collective)
Pearse McGloughlin & Nocturnes Live at St. Finian's (2015) (Urchin Collective)
The Soft Animal (2016) LP (Urchin Music)/Bluestack Records

The Rest (2020) LP (Bluestack Records)
