= Live in France =

Live in France may refer to:

- Live in France, album by Soft Machine
- Live in France (Rodrigo y Gabriela album)
- Live in France, by P.J. Harvey 2004
