= Rodrigo y Gabriela (album) =

Studio album by Rodrigo y Gabriela
- Released: 17 February 2006
- Recorded: October 2005
- Studios: Riverside Studios, Bath
- Genres: Acoustic; folk; rock
- Length: 42:49
- Label: Rubyworks
- Producers: John Leckie; Rodrigo y Gabriela

Rodrigo y Gabriela chronology
| Live: Manchester and Dublin (2004) | Rodrigo y Gabriela (2006) | Live in Japan (2008) |

Singles from Rodrigo y Gabriela
- 1. "Tamacun" Released: 6 February 2006; 2. "Stairway to Heaven" Released: 28 July 2006

Professional ratings
Review scores
| Source | Rating |
|---|---|
| AllMusic | 4/5 stars |

Rodrigo y Gabriela is the second studio album by Mexican musical duo Rodrigo y Gabriela. It was first released in Ireland on 17 February 2006, where it debuted at number one on the Irish Albums Chart. The album included covers of Led Zeppelin's "Stairway to Heaven" and Metallica's "Orion", two artists who the duo say influenced their music.

Their album was subsequently certified platinum in Ireland.

The Japanese version of the album has an extra track, named "Señorita Xxx".

== Track listing ==
All music is composed by Rodrigo y Gabriela, except where noted.

| No. | Title | Writer(s) | Length |
|---|---|---|---|
| 1. | "Tamacun" | | 3:25 |
| 2. | "Diablo Rojo" | | 4:56 |
| 3. | "Vikingman" | | 4:03 |
| 4. | "Satori" | | 5:04 |
| 5. | "Ixtapa" (violin solo played and improvised by Roby Lakatos) | | 5:13 |
| 6. | "Stairway to Heaven" | Jimmy Page, Robert Plant | 4:44 |
| 7. | "Orion" | James Hetfield, Lars Ulrich, Cliff Burton | 7:44 |
| 8. | "Juan Loco" | | 3:27 |
| 9. | "PPA (Pinche Personal Assistant)" | | 4:12 |

Note

- The producer, John Leckie, added radio static to "Vikingman".

== Personnel ==
Rodrigo y Gabriela

- Rodrigo Sánchez – acoustic guitar
- Gabriela Quintero – acoustic guitar

Additional performer

- Roby Lakatos – violin on "Ixtapa"

Production and design

- Produced by John Leckie and Rodrigo y Gabriela
- Mixed by John Leckie
- Assistant engineering by Tom Dalgety and Rick Levy
- Mastered by Robyn Robins
- Pre-production assistance by Graham Higgins and Negra Modelo
- Album Cover Photography Carlo Polli
- Photography – Kris Janis Berzins
- Additional photos – Colin Malakie, Carlo Polli, Rodrigo, Tina Korhonen, Roger Woolman, Alan Maguire
- Front cover image – Digital Vision/Getty Images
- Album design – Dara Ní Bheacháin

== Charts ==
Chart performance for Rodrigo y Gabriela
| Chart (2006) | Peak position |
|---|---|
| Australian Albums (ARIA) | 99 |
| French Albums (SNEP) | 70 |
| Irish Albums (IRMA) | 1 |
| Swiss Albums (Schweizer Hitparade) | 90 |
| UK Albums (Official Charts) | 53 |
