= Cruinniú na nÓg =

Youth activity day in Ireland

- Frequency: Annually in June
- Country: Ireland
- Years active: 8
- Inaugurated: 23 June 2018
- Previous event: 15 June 2024
- Major events: Art music; computer programming; dancing; DIY; graffiti art; stop motion animation
- Organiser: Creative Ireland, Department of Culture, Communications and Sport
- Sponsor: RTÉ and local authorities
- Website: cruinniu.gov.ie

Cruinniú na nÓg (Gathering of Youth) is an annual national day of free creative activities for children and young people under the age of 18 in Ireland.

== History ==
The Cruinniú na nÓg event has been held annually since 2018. Due to the COVID-19 pandemic, the 2020 and 2021 events were run as a series of primarily online and virtual activities. The 2022 program returned to in-person live events for the first time since 2019, with over 450 free creative events for young people in Ireland. In 2023, over 750 activities were offered.

"The Spark", a song originally made for Cruinniú na nÓg, became a viral hit in 2024.
