= 9 Dead Alive =

Studio album by Rodrigo y Gabriela
- Released: April 25, 2014
- Recorded: October 2013
- Studio: Lumbini Studios, Ixtapa, Mexico
- Length: 40:58
- Label: Rubyworks
- Producer: Rodrigo y Gabriela

Rodrigo y Gabriela chronology
Area 52 (2012)	9 Dead Alive (2014)	Mettavolution (2019)

Singles from 9 Dead Alive
- 1. "The Soundmaker" Released: 4 March 2014

Professional ratings
Aggregate scores
Source	Rating
Metacritic	65/100
Review scores
Source	Rating
Allmusic	4/5 stars
Consequence of Sound	B−
The Guardian	3/5 stars
musicOMH	3.5/5 stars
NME	5/10
Ultimate Guitar Archive	9.7/10

9 Dead Alive is the fourth studio album by Mexican guitar duo Rodrigo y Gabriela released on 25 April 2014 in Ireland and on 29 April 2014 internationally. According to their Twitter, "each track is a personal celebration of individuals who have passed on, but through their deeds and words still resonate in the 21st century", and is said to be a more rock-focused album compared to their Latin-focused material of the past. Its first single is "The Soundmaker", which is inspired by Spanish guitarist Antonio de Torres Jurado.

== Track listing ==
All music is composed by Rodrigo y Gabriela.

No.	Title	Dedicated to	Length
1.	"The Soundmaker"	Antonio de Torres Jurado	4:52
2.	"Torito"	Animals and Nature	5:03
3.	"Sunday Neurosis"	Viktor Frankl	5:16
4.	"Misty Moses"	Harriet Tubman	4:39
5.	"Somnium"	Sor Juana Inés de la Cruz	3:43
6.	"Fram"	Fridtjof Nansen	4:31
7.	"Megalopolis"	Gabriela Mistral	5:01
8.	"The Russian Messenger"	Fyodor Dostoyevsky	4:52
9.	"La salle des pas perdus"	Eleanor of Aquitaine	3:01
Total length:			40:58

== Charts ==
Chart (2014)	Peak position
Belgian Albums (Ultratop Flanders)	39
Belgian Albums (Ultratop Wallonia)	49
French Albums (SNEP)	42
Irish Albums (IRMA)	24
Swiss Albums (Schweizer Hitparade)	73
