= White Fox (album) =

Studio album by Ham Sandwich
- Released: 1 October 2010
- Recorded: 2010
- Studio: Sun Studios (County Dublin); May Lodge (County Meath)
- Genre: Indie rock
- Length: 33:21
- Label: Route 109A Records
- Producer: Karl Odlum

Ham Sandwich chronology
Carry the Meek (2008)	White Fox (2010)	Stories from the Surface (2015)

White Fox is the second album by Irish band Ham Sandwich. It was released on 1 October 2010 and has received generally favourable reviews. It is the band's first album without bassist and principal songwriter John Moore, who departed the band earlier in the year.

White Fox is dedicated to the band's manager, Derek Nally, who died shortly before the band were scheduled to begin recording of the album.

== Production and release ==
Having taken a break following the release of Carry the Meek and the resulting tour, Ham Sandwich released their first new material on 9 November 2009, in the form of the single "Out of the Darkness". On 12 April 2010 bassist and songwriter John Moore announced he was leaving the band. The band decided to continue on with work on their new album, with plans to begin recording in late-July. However, the band's manager, Derek Nally, died on 15 July 2010, just days before the band were due to begin recording. Deciding to continue on as planned, White Fox was recorded, mixed and mastered in just three months. Recording took place at Sun Studios in Temple Bar and at May Lodge in County Meath. The album was produced by Karl Odlum, who had previously produced the band's debut album. Odlum also played the bass parts on the album, filling in for the recently departed Moore. The album was mastered by Peter Mew at Abbey Road Studios in England.

White Fox was released on 1 October 2010. As with all previous releases, it was released independently on the band's own Route 109A Records label. Several singles were released from the album, the most successful of which was "Ants". Although it failed to chart, the song received considerable radio play and the accompanying video won the Best Concept award at the 2011 IMTV Awards.

== Reception ==
Professional ratings
Review scores
Source	Rating
Hot Press	4/5 stars
State	4/5 stars
entertainment.ie	3/5 stars
Pop Culture Monster	4.5/5 stars

== Track listing ==
All tracks are written by Ham Sandwich.

No.	Title	Length
1.	"The Naturist"	3:23
2.	"White Fox"	3:49
3.	"Ants"	3:59
4.	"OH-OH"	3:26
5.	"Models"	3:05
6.	"The Fog"	3:00
7.	"Long Distance"	3:08
8.	"In December"	3:03
9.	"Animals"	3:44
10.	"Floors"	2:44
Total length:		33:21

== Personnel ==
=== Ham Sandwich ===
- Niamh Farrell - lead vocals
- Podge McNamee - lead vocals, guitar
- Brian Darcy - guitar
- Ollie Murphy - drums

=== Production ===
- Karl Odlum - production, bass
- Peter Mew - mastering

== Charts ==
Chart (2010)	Peak position
Irish Album Chart	25
