= Lily of the Valley (album) =

Studio album by Funeral Suits
- Released: 2 July 2012
- Length: 43:33
- Label: Model Citizen
- Producer: Stephen Street

Funeral Suits chronology
Lily of the Valley (2012)	Islands Apart (2016)

Professional ratings
Review scores
Source	Rating
The 405	7/10
DIY	3.5/5 stars
The Irish Times	4/5 stars

Lily of the Valley is the debut studio album by Irish alternative rock band Funeral Suits. It was released on 4 June 2012, by Model Citizen Records.

== Singles ==
The first track from album, "Machines" was released as a music video on 5 February 2009.

On 14 April 2011, Funeral Suits released the second music video "Colour Fade".

== Critical reception ==
In a review for DIY, El Hunt wrote: "On the ominously named Lily Of The Valley - with all its symbolic associations with death and mourning — the listener happily gobbles it up for breakfast lunch and tea. This is in part due to the band's impressive command of their craft, and also the album's place in the almost foolproof hands of Stephen Street." At The 405, critic reviewer Alex Walker noted: "Although the record is not revolutionary, nor would it have been even if had been released a year and a half ago. It is however a very solid debut release; heartfelt and sincere, brimming with a variety of well conceived ideas. The band have a genuine knack for crafting big, epic, extravagant guitar moments complimented throughout by intelligent electronic arrangements."

== Track listing ==
Lily of the Valley track listing
No.	Title	Length
1.	"Mary's Revenge"	4:22
2.	"Colour Fade"	3:47
3.	"Health"	4:00
4.	"Hands Down by Your Side"	5:14
5.	"All Those Friendly People"	4:38
6.	"We Only Attack Ourselves"	3:21
7.	"Adventures Misadventures"	4:04
8.	"Stars Are Spaceships"	4:32
9.	"Florida"	3:30
10.	"Machines Too"	3:15
11.	"I Still Love the High"	2:50
