= Live in France (Rodrigo y Gabriela album) =

Live album by Rodrigo y Gabriela
- Released: 19 July 2011
- Length: 54:10
- Label: Rubyworks
- Producer: Rodrigo y Gabriela

Rodrigo y Gabriela chronology
| 11:11 (2009) | Live in France (2011) | Area 52 (2012) |

Professional ratings
Review scores
| Source | Rating |
|---|---|
| AllMusic | 3.5/5 stars |

Live in France is the third live album by Mexican guitar duo Rodrigo y Gabriela. It was recorded at various dates in France on their 11:11 world tour. It was released on 19 July 2011 in the United States and 25 July in the rest of the world.

== Track listing ==
All music is composed by Rodrigo y Gabriela.

| No. | Title | Length |
|---|---|---|
| 1. | "Hanuman" | 4:47 |
| 2. | "Triveni" | 4:28 |
| 3. | "Chac Mool" | 1:10 |
| 4. | "Hora Zero" | 5:51 |
| 5. | "Santo Domingo" | 6:27 |
| 6. | "Gabriela Solo" | 4:11 |
| 7. | "Buster Voodoo" | 5:26 |
| 8. | "11:11" | 5:16 |
| 9. | "Rodrigo Solo" | 6:32 |
| 10. | "Savitri" | 4:01 |
| 11. | "Tamacun" | 6:01 |

== Personnel ==
Rodrigo y Gabriela

- Rodrigo Sánchez – acoustic guitar
- Gabriela Quintero – acoustic guitar

Production

- Rodrigo y Gabriela – production
- Naoto Tanemura – mixing
- Ray Staff – mastering
- Arno Paul – photography
- Rod Maurice – front cover photo
- Kmeron – back cover photo
