= Rhythms del Mundo Classics =

Classics

Compilation album by Rhythms del Mundo
- Released: July 15, 2009
- Recorded: 2007–2008
- Genre: Salsa, mambo, son, bolero, Latin, tropical
- Label: Universal Music

Rhythms del Mundo chronology
Rhythms del Mundo (2006)	Classics (2009)

Rhythms del Mundo: Classics is the follow-up album to the internationally successful album Rhythms del Mundo, released in 2009, with the Buena Vista Social Club appearing with artists including the Killers, Amy Winehouse, Keane, Jack Johnson, the Rolling Stones, KT Tunstall and Rodrigo y Gabriela.

== Charity ==
Proceeds from the album benefited the environmental non-profit organization Artists Project Earth, which raises awareness and funds for climate change projects and for disaster relief efforts.

== Track listing ==
All tracks by RDM, featured performers listed below.

1. "Hotel California" – The Killers
2. "Cupid" – Amy Winehouse
3. "Imagine" – Jack Johnson
4. "Under Pressure" – Keane
5. "Walk on the Wild Side" – Editors
6. "I Heard It Through The Grapevine" – Kaiser Chiefs
7. "(I Can't Get No) Satisfaction" – Cat Power
8. "Under the Boardwalk" – The Rolling Stones
9. "Runaway" – The Zutons
10. "Because the Night" – KT Tunstall
11. "Bohemian Rhapsody" – Augusto Enriquez
12. "For What It's Worth" – OneRepublic
13. "Big Yellow Taxi" – Aquila Rose and Idana Valdes
14. "Beat It" – Fall Out Boy and John Mayer
15. "Purple Haze" – RDM
16. "Smells Like Teen Spirit" – Shanade
17. "Are You Ready for Love" – The Kooks
18. "Mi Cherie Amour" – Eros Ramazzotti
19. "Stairway to Heaven" – Rodrigo y Gabriela

== Charts ==
Chart performance for Rhythms del Mundo Classics
Chart (2009)	Peak position
Australian Albums (ARIA)	89
Austrian Albums Chart	30
Belgium (Flanders) Albums Chart	58
French Albums Chart	124
Mexican Albums Chart	4
Swiss Albums Chart	25
US Top Heatseekers (Billboard)	30
