= Re-Foc =

re-Foc

Studio album by Rodrigo y Gabriela
- Released: 2002
- Length: 40:15
- Label: Rubyworks
- Producer: Rodrigo y Gabriela

Rodrigo y Gabriela chronology
re-Foc (2002)	Live: Manchester and Dublin (2004)

Professional ratings
Review scores
Source	Rating
AllMusic	3/5 stars

re-Foc is the first widely available album by Mexican guitar duo Rodrigo y Gabriela, released in 2002. Some songs are re-recorded versions of those that appeared on Foc, a 9-track demo put together by the band in April/May 2001. The demo was "recorded at home, without microphones - everything was played through the guitar pick-ups. This meant that some of the percussion on the strings sounded very quiet". Others were written for the album, which features contributions from the violinist Zoë Conway and bodhrán player and percussionist Robbie Harris.

== Track listing ==
All tracks are written by Rodrigo Sánchez and Gabriela Quintero, except where noted.

No.	Title	Writer(s)	Length
1.	"Diem" (dedicated to Dave Mustaine)		4:50
2.	"New One"		6:09
3.	"Foc"		5:39
4.	"Georges Street" / "The Tartar Frigate"	Sánchez, Quintero / Matt Seattle	4:21
5.	"30 de Marzo"		4:14
6.	"Paris"		3:52
7.	"Take Five" / "One (foc-ing version 9)"	Paul Desmond / James Hetfield, Lars Ulrich	6:44
8.	"Temple Bar"		4:27

Some editions list the last track as "Sangre y Ritmo" instead of "Temple Bar".

Track 6 contains an excerpt of "Blitzkrieg" (Blitzkrieg).

== Personnel ==
Rodrigo y Gabriela

- Rodrigo Sánchez – acoustic guitar, cymbals, hi-hats, shakers
- Gabriela Quintero – acoustic guitar

Additional performers

- Zoë Conway – violin, vocals
- Robbie Harris – percussion, bongos, shakers, cymbals, bodhrán
- Johnny Daly – double bass
- Claudia Chambers – cajón
- Aran O'Malley – cymbals

Production

- Produced by Rodrigo y Gabriela
- Mixed by Alberto Pinto, except "Temple Bar", mixed by Fionan De Barra
- Mastered by Robyn Robins
- Art direction, design, and fire photography by Marcus Byrne
- Photography by Cormac Scully
