= The Spark (Kabin Crew and Lisdoonvarna Crew song) =

Single by Kabin Crew and Lisdoonvarna Crew
- Released: June 13, 2024
- Genre: Drum and bass; Irish hip hop
- Length: 2:26
- Label: Rubyworks
- Songwriters: Ahmed Mohamed Osman Addelgadir; Alex Brady; Dylan McCarthy; Dylan Murphy; Elene Kurtanidze; Garry McCarthy; Heidi White; Jackie Rea; Kada Rrudhani; Mercy Areghe Imoniaro; Nonhlanhla Ruth Sibanda; Piotr Ostrowski; Rosaleen Brady; Róisín Cullinane; Sophia McNamara; Treasure Onyinyechukwu Kanikwu; Trinity Chisom Kanikwu; Tuana Rrudhani
- Producers: Garry McCarthy; PapaPedro

"The Spark" is a song by the Irish children's hip hop groups Kabin Crew and Lisdoonvarna Crew. It was first released as a music video on 16 May 2024 by Creative Ireland—an Irish government organization that organizes Cruinniú na nÓg, an annual day dedicated to children's creativity—and later released as a single onto streaming platforms by Rubyworks Records on 13 June 2024.

The unofficial Cruinniú na nÓg anthem was produced by GMCBeats, director of the Cork-based nonprofit the Kabin Studio, where the Kabin Crew was formed during an Easter workshop. "The Spark" features both them and the Lisdoonvarna Crew, which consists of asylum seeker children from a direct provision centre in Lisdoonvarna, rapping about their creativity over a drum and bass beat. It went viral online after its music video was posted by RTÉ and saw further virality on TikTok, also receiving critical and social media praise.

== Background ==
"The Spark" was made by the youth rap project Rhyme Island, part of the Knocknaheeny, Cork-based art not-for-profit organization the Kabin Studio, a youth music space created in 2012 and based in a repurposed metal container. It had what Rory Carroll of The Guardian described as a "shoestring budget". It was produced by Kabin Studio's creative director and founder Garry McCarthy, also known as GMCBeats, and features about 15 children from ages nine to 12, from either a Kabin Studio workshop (Kabin Crew) or from a direct provision centre in Lisdoonvarna in County Clare (Lisdoonvarna Crew). The chorus and first verse were written by the Kabin Crew during an Easter workshop at Kabin Studio and the Lisdoonvarna Crew finished writing the song separately.

McCarthy first met the Lisdoonvarna Crew in April 2023 through an outreach workshop with the Kabin Studio and was inspired to invite them to perform on the song because of their confidence, describing them as "legends". Treasure Onyinyechukwu Kanikwu, Elene Kurtanidze, Kada Rrudhani of Kosovo, Mercy Imoniaro, and Tuana Rrudhani are members of the Lisdoonvarna Crew, while Heidi White, Sophia Natasha McNamara—known as Lil' Sophia—and MC Tiny are members of Kabin Crew. At the time of the song's recording, Lil' Sophia was a youth ambassador for Rhyme Island and helped the other children write their lyrics. Before releasing "The Spark", Kabin Crew released the 2020 song "Ya Boy", which was used in the short film Christy, while the Lisdoonvarna Crew released the viral song "Let Me Do My Thing" and were invited to the Irish television special The Late Late Toy Show at the end of 2023.

== Composition ==
"The Spark" is an upbeat and motivational Irish hip hop song with a "bouncy" drum and bass beat produced by PapaPedro (released separately as an instrumental under the title Titan), on which both groups rap about expressing their creativity. The first verse begins with a rap from Lil' Sophia. The song's lyrics were based on positive themes the children decided to write about, such as encouragement and independence. It is dedicated to Cruinniú na nÓg, a national Irish day featuring hundreds of creative events for children—including, as of 2024, some hosted by Rhyme Island—that was started in 2018 and is funded by the Irish government initiative Creative Ireland. The song's title is taken from its chorus, in which both crews rap, "Think you can stop what we do? I doubt it/We got the energy, I'll tell you all about it/I searched for my spark and I found it/Everybody in the crowd start bouncing".

== Music video, release, and commercial performance ==
The song's music video was filmed and edited by tutor and videographer SwanIGuess and was filmed in one day at various locations, including central Cork, on top of a 202 double-decker bus, at the Pavilion Music Venue, and at Kabin Studio. In the video, both groups appear in colorful clothing with glow sticks, face paint, bucket hats, and sunglasses. Clara O’Riordan-Cummins (aka Hoops), who sings in the chorus appears hula-hooping on the song’s cover image. The video was posted online by Creative Ireland and by RTÉ on 16 May 2024 and received tens of thousands of views within a week of its being posted.

"The Spark" soon went viral on TikTok after its music video was reposted by a popular account on the platform, receiving over seven million views by June 2024. A video of the Kabin Crew rapping the song on Cork's Red FM and another of the Kabin Crew rapping it on their TikTok account gained six million and four million views, respectively, and commenters on the platform largely praised the song. TikTok users also created dances set to the song and it was used in more than 22 thousand videos on the platform by June 2024. On YouTube, its music video had more than one million views by that same point. It was also discussed on NPR, on the American TV series After Midnight, and in NME, and used in videos by social media accounts for Teletubbies and McLaren. On June 7, 2025, the video game Fortnite added a dance emote titled "The Spark" to its online shop, which featured a looping clip of the song's chorus.

"The Spark" was officially released onto streaming platforms through Rubyworks Records on 13 June 2024. Following its official release, "The Spark" peaked at number 38 on the UK's Official Singles Sales Chart, at number 33 on the Official Singles Downloads Chart, and at number nine on the Official Independent Singles Breakers Chart. It was included in several electronic dance music sets performed at Glastonbury Festival 2024 in June 2024. Also that month, Kabin Crew and Lisdoonvarna Crew performed the song live at a Becky Hill concert in Cork. They were scheduled to perform the song during Kabin Crew's collaborative one-night performance with the Irish National Opera, The Sound of the Northside, at the Everyman in July 2024.

== Reception ==
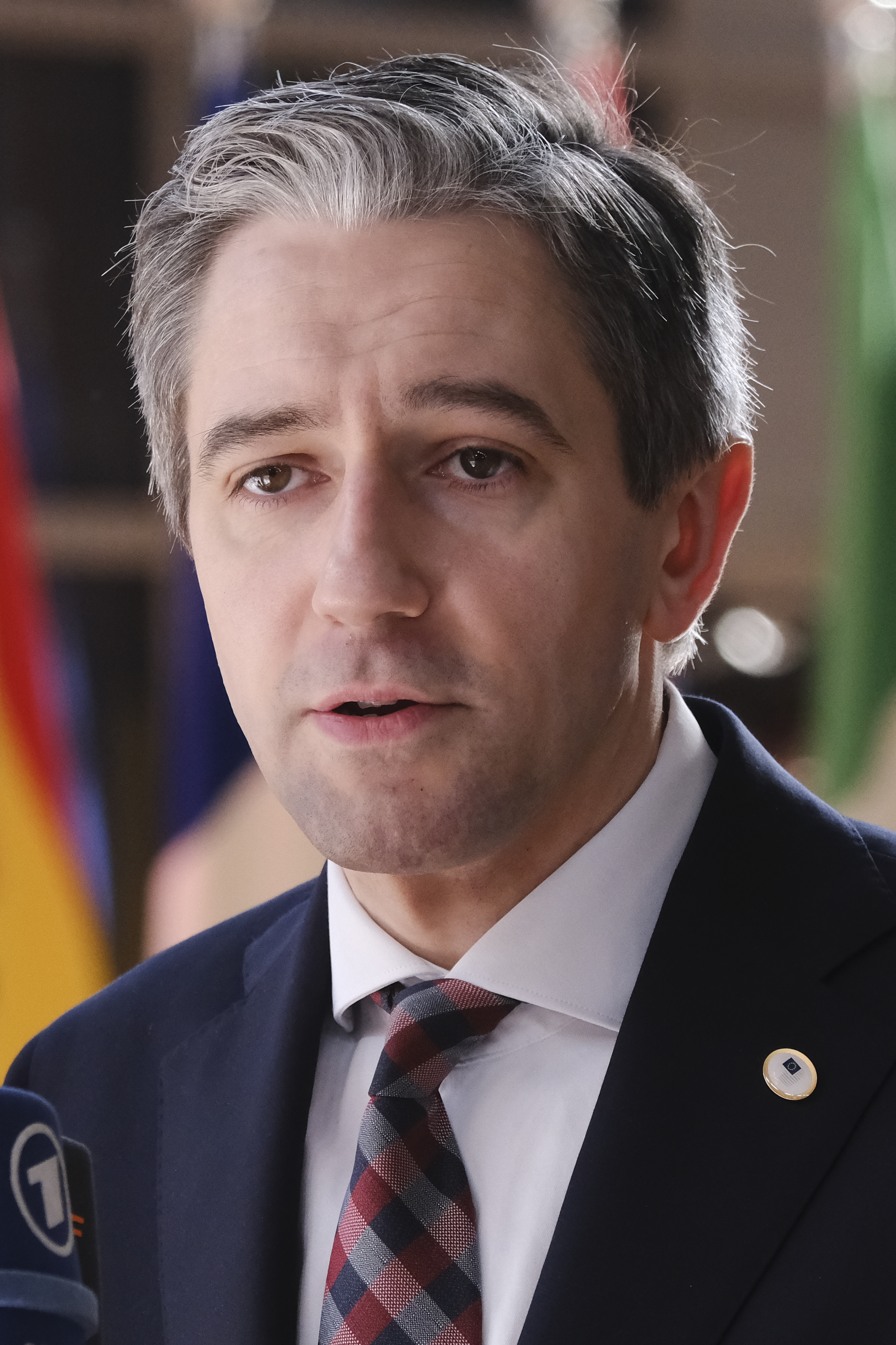
Taoiseach Simon Harris (pictured) faced controversy for using "The Spark" in a promotional video for his party Fine Gael without crediting Kabin Crew or being given their permission.

Madison Malone Kircher of The New York Times wrote that "The Spark" "could have easily sounded grating to adult ears", but was "instead unrelentingly catchy". Moises Mendez II of Time praised "The Spark" as "the catchiest—and most inspiring—tune of the summer" and wrote that its enthusiasm and energy were "infectious". Nick Reilly of Rolling Stone UK called "The Spark" an "almighty DnB banger". Tione Zylstra of The Music called it a "an upbeat drum'n'bass masterpiece" with "a sassy yet encouraging vibe". It was described, including in the Irish Independent and by Reilly of Rolling Stone UK, as the "song of the summer". NPR's Anastasia Tsioulcas praised the song as a "totally infectious bop" that was "cheery and wholesome". Mike Hadge jokingly wrote for The Daily Dot that "The Spark" was good enough that there was "just no point anymore" for any other musicians to continue working.

In early June 2024, a video by Taoiseach Simon Harris for his centre-right political party, Fine Gael, encouraged people to vote for the party's candidates in the Limerick mayoral, European Parliament, and Irish local elections, with "The Spark" playing in the background and a reference to the song in its caption. The video did not credit Kabin Crew, which prompted them to tweet, "Ah Jaysus, lads, at least credit the kids who performed the track." They added that they were "not comfortable with ['The Spark'] being used for political means" and asked Fine Gael to "cease all usage with immediate effect". Fine Gael later issued an apology for using the song without Kabin Crew's permission and a spokesperson stated that the party would be making a donation to Kabin Crew Studio. Far-right social media users responded to Fine Gael's usage of the song by criticizing the Irish government's policy on immigration.

== Charts ==
=== Weekly charts ===
Weekly chart performance for "The Spark"
| Chart (2024) | Peak position |
|---|---|
| Czech Republic Singles Digital (ČNS IFPI) | 63 |
| UK Independent Singles Breakers Chart (OCC) | 9 |
| UK Singles Downloads (OCC) | 33 |
| UK Singles Sales (OCC) | 38 |
| US Hot Dance/Electronic Songs (Billboard) | 33 |
