= Live: Manchester and Dublin =

Live in Manchester and Dublin

Live album by Rodrigo y Gabriela
- Released: 2004
- Label: Rubyworks
- Producer: Rodrigo y Gabriela

Rodrigo y Gabriela chronology
re-Foc (2003)	Live in Manchester and Dublin (2004)	Rodrigo y Gabriela (2006)

Professional ratings
Review scores
Source	Rating
Allmusic	4/5 stars

Live: Manchester and Dublin is the first live album by Mexican guitar duo Rodrigo y Gabriela, released in 2004 through Rubyworks Records.

== Critical reception ==
The album was given a positive review by The Guardian, saying "There's a wild streak to these recordings I've not heard in previous performances by Rodrigo y Gabriela, and it's very welcome. This is a World Music album that swings." It was also included in their list of 1,000 albums to hear before you die.

== Track listing ==
All music is composed by Rodrigo y Gabriela, except where noted.

No.	Title	Writer(s)	Length
1.	"Foc"		6:50
2.	"Hola"		0:53
3.	"One/Take Five"	James Hetfield, Lars Ulrich / Paul Desmond	6:48
4.	"Mr Tang"		3:39
5.	"Paris"		3:52
6.	"Libertango"	Ástor Piazzolla	3:14
7.	"Capitan Casanova"		4:00
8.	"One"	Hetfield, Ulrich	7:58

Track 1 ends with a reference to the ending of "Fight Fire with Fire". Track 4 contains an excerpt of "Seven Nation Army". Track 5 contains an excerpt of "Master of Puppets". Track 5 contains an excerpt of "Mediterranean Sundance/Rio Ancho" (Al Di Meola/Paco De Lucia). Track 7 begins with an excerpt of "Dirty Window" and ends with references to "Of Wolf and Man" and live renditions of "Battery". Track 8 has a 1-minute silence starting at 5:05; The reasoning behind this is unknown.

Tracks 1–4 recorded in Manchester, UK, at Manchester Academy 2 on 12 February 2004. Tracks 5–8 recorded in Dublin, Ireland, at Christ Church Cathedral on 2 December 2003.

== Personnel ==
Rodrigo y Gabriela

- Rodrigo Sánchez – acoustic guitar
- Gabriela Quintero – acoustic guitar

Additional performers

- Zoë Conway – violin on tracks 5–8, vocals on track 8.
- Ruth O'Leary – violin on tracks 7–8.

Production

- Produced by Rodrigo y Gabriela
- Live engineering by Graham Higgins
- Mixed by Neil Causier and Colin Sullivan
- Mastered by Robyn Robins
- Video directed and edited by David O'Rourke
- Video shot by O'Rourke, Mark Rubbathan, Craig Rubbathan, Dean Lochner, Conn Holohan
- Cover concept by Rodrigo y Gabriela
- Design and photography by Marcus Byrne
- Live agent – Paul Wilson at CAA
- Accountant – Anthony Casey
- Management – Niall Muckian
