= Ham Sandwich (band) =

Irish indie rock band

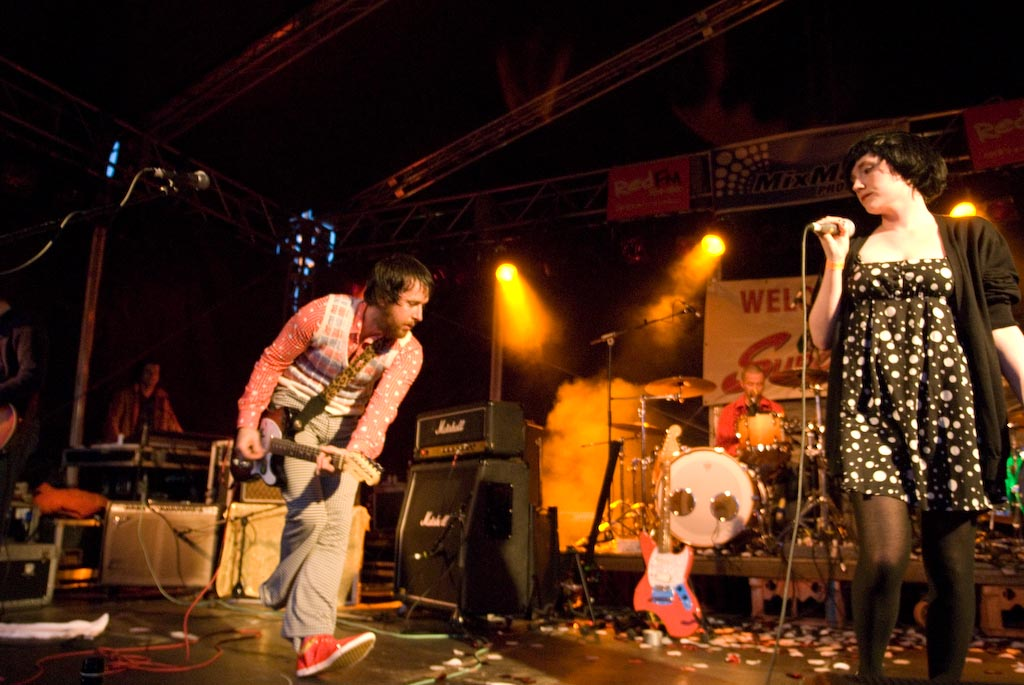
- Ham Sandwich at Mitchelstown Indie Pendence Festival 2007

Background information
- Origin: Kells, Ireland
- Genres: Indie pop
- Years active: 2003–present
- Label: Route 109A records
- Members: Niamh Farrell; Podge McNamee; Brian Darcy
- Past members: John Moore; Ollie Murphy; David McEnroe
- Website: Official

Ham Sandwich (stylized as HamsandwicH) are an Irish indie rock band from Kells, County Meath.

The band originally consisted of Niamh Farrell (vocals), Podge McNamee (vocals and guitar), Brian Darcy (guitar and piano), John Moore (bass guitar) and Ollie Murphy (drums). On 12 April 2010, Moore announced he was leaving the band, and was later replaced by David McEnroe who played bass up until late 2017. By the end of 2018 Murphy had left the band also, with the remaining members continuing as a trio. Comedian, Fred Cooke has also played with the band.

To date, the band have released four studio albums: Carry the Meek (2008), White Fox (2010), Stories from the Surface (2015) and Magnify (2022).

== History ==
=== Formation and early years (2003-06) ===
Ham Sandwich was formed by John Moore, Podge McNamee and Niamh Farrell at a crucifixion party on Good Friday 2003, initially with Moore as guitarist and McNamee and Farrell as vocalists. McNamee and Moore had been friends since childhood, growing up in Kells, County Meath, and Farrell had befriended McNamee upon her recent return to Ireland after spending several years in Scotland. Brian Darcy, who McNamee had known from school, was recruited as a guitarist and Ollie Murphy joined soon after as the group's drummer. Moore suggested the band's name at an early rehearsal session, initially as a joke, before it was officially adopted by the band. The band initially faced much criticism for their unusual name, most notably by U2 frontman Bono, but Farrell has defended the choice to keep the name stating: "I suppose we were a bit stubborn at first and then I think it got so far that we couldn't change it because then we would have been known as 'so-and-so, formerly known as 'Ham Sandwich' and there's nothing worse than having to put that on a poster, but people have started warming to it."

The band spent the next year writing and rehearsing songs, with Moore as their primary songwriter, before giving their first live performance in their home town of Kells. They released their debut single, "Sad Songs", in August 2005. Rather than seeking a record label contract, the band published the single on their own independent label, Route 109A Records, named for the bus route between Kells and Dublin. The decision to release their first single independently, rather than seek a major record label deal, came from a desire to work and develop at their own pace, as well as to retain control over their own music. All of the band's subsequent releases have been on their own label. The band continued to tour around Ireland throughout 2006, releasing two further singles, "St. Christopher" on 20 February and "Words" on 19 September.

=== Carry the Meek and White Fox (2007-13) ===
On 16 February 2007, Ham Sandwich released their fourth single, "click..click...BOOM!!!" This was followed by a short tour of Ireland in support of the release. The band made their Irish television debut in February, performing the single on The Late Late Show. Later that year, the band began work on their first album, Carry the Meek, having enlisted Irish musician Karl Odlum as producer. The album was recorded in a home-made studio at Headfort House in Kells. The album was released on 15 February 2008 and received generally favourable reviews in the Irish media. On the same day the band won the Hope for 2008 Award at the Meteor Music Awards. The band released three more singles from the album 2008, "Keepsake", "Never Talk" and "Broken Glass", and embarked on tours of Ireland and the UK, including spots at Glastonbury and Electric Picnic.

In April of 2009 Farrell was convicted of the theft of €14, 000 from her former employer, BT2, receiving a suspended sentence of four months for her actions. On 6 November 2009, the band released "Out of the Darkness", the first single from their planned sophomore album, although it did not appear on the album when it was eventually released. On 12 April 2010, Moore left the band, citing a "typographical error". On 15 July 2010 the band's manager, Derek Nally, died after suffering a heart attack. Despite the personal turmoil, the band re-entered the studio to start work on their second album afresh, with Karl Odlum returning as producer as well as filling in on bass guitar duties for the departed Moore. On 7 May 2010, the band released their next single, "The Naturist". Their second album, White Fox, was released on 1 October 2010 and was dedicated to Nally. The band continued to tour, with David McEnroe filling in on bass, and released the next single from the album, "OH-OH", on 18 October 2010.

On 4 February 2011, "Ants" was released as the third single from the album. Although the song failed to chart, the video became a viral hit and won the Best Concept award at the 2011 IMTV Awards. The band's next single, "Models", was released on 15 June 2011 and was later used extensively in the Discover Ireland TV and radio campaign in support of The Gathering initiative in 2013. In December, the band finished off the year with performances on the Irish television show Other Voices, as part of its 10-year anniversary celebrations, and at the New Year's celebrations at The Village. The band continued to tour throughout 2012 and 2013, playing their first headline show at Dublin's Academy on 18 February 2012. The final single from White Fox, "Long Distance", was released in June 2012. Other notable performances included playing at the President of Ireland's Garden Party at Áras an Uachtaráin and supporting Bon Jovi at Slane Castle, both in June 2013.

=== Stories from the Surface and singles (2014–2019) ===
Having toured extensively in support of White Fox, Ham Sandwich began recording their third album at Westland Row Studios in 2014, with Karl Odlum once again producing. On 30 March 2014 the band debuted "Illuminate", the first single from the new album, prior to their first headlining gig at the Olympia Theatre. That year saw Niamh Farrell present televised coverage of the Choice Music Prize. Following support gigs over the summer for Arcade Fire and Mumford and Sons, the band released the second single, "Apollo" on 31 October 2014 as a free download on their website. On 9 February 2015, the band announced that their third album, Stories from the Surface, would be released on 17 April 2015. It was released to generally positive reviews, becoming the band's first album to top the Irish album charts, and would go on to be nominated for Choice Music Prize's best album of 2015. A third single, "Fandango", was released prior to the album on 13 March 2015.

On 23 November 2017, the band released "Bodies", their first new recording for a potential fourth album. The song represented a shift in musical styles, incorporating more synth-pop influences into the band's sound, and was well received. Another single, "Reaction", was released the following year on 3 December 2018. This track continued with the more electronic sound that the band had adopted with "Bodies". Neither song ended up being included on their subsequent album.

At some point prior to the recording of their next album, both McEnroe and Murphy left the band, with the remaining members continuing to tour and record as a trio. Murphy was subsequently convicted of rape in 2024, and sentenced to 5 years imprisonment for the crime

=== Magnify (2020–present) ===
Now a three-piece band, Ham Sandwich began writing for their fourth album while the band's members were under lockdown restrictions at home in Ireland during the COVID-19 pandemic in 2020. They collaborated remotely during this time, recording demos individually and sharing them with each other. The band initially planned to record the whole album remotely, but this soon proved too impractical, and recording was postponed until lockdown restrictions were eased enough for the band's members to enter a studio together in 2021. On 5 November 2021, the band released the first song from these recording sessions, "Electro-Wave". Their new album, Magnify, was released the following year on 30 September. The band continued to tour around Ireland in support of the album's release, culminating in a show at the Olympia Theatre to celebrate the band's 20th anniversary on 21 October 2023. This concert was recorded and later released as The Live Album on 15 March 2024.

== Personnel ==
Current members

- Niamh Farrell - lead vocals (2003–present), bass (2021–present)
- Podge McNamee - lead vocals, guitar (2003–present)
- Brian Darcy - guitar (2003–present)

Former members

- John Moore - bass (2003–2010)
- David McEnroe - bass (2010–2017)
- Ollie Murphy - drums (2003–2019)

== Discography ==
=== Studio albums ===
Title	Album details	Peak chart positions
Title	Album details	IRL
Carry the Meek	Released: 15 February 2008; Label: Route 109A Records; Formats: CD, Download	23
White Fox	Released: 1 October 2010; Label: Route 109A Records; Formats: CD, Download, Vinyl	25
Stories from the Surface	Released: 17 April 2015; Label: Route 109A Records; Formats: CD, Download	1
Magnify	Released: 30 September 2022; Label: Route 109A Records; Formats: CD, Download	11
"—" denotes a recording that did not chart or was not released in that territory.

=== Live Albums ===
Title	Album details	Peak chart positions
Title	Album details	IRL
The Live Album	Released: 15 March 2024; Label: Route 109A Records; Formats: Vinyl	—
"—" denotes a recording that did not chart or was not released in that territory.

=== Singles ===
Title	Year	Peak chart positions	Album
Title	Year	IRL	Album
"Sad Songs"	2005	—	Carry the Meek
"St. Christopher"	2006	—	Carry the Meek
"Words"	2006	—	Carry the Meek
"click...click...BOOM!!!"	2007	—	Carry the Meek
"Keepsake"	2008	—	Carry the Meek
"Never Talk"	2008	—	Carry the Meek
"Broken Glass"	2008	—	Carry the Meek
"Out of the Darkness"	2009	—	non-album single
"The Naturist"	2010	—	White Fox
"OH-OH"	2010	—	White Fox
"Ants"	2011	—	White Fox
"Models"	2011	—	White Fox
"Long Distance"	2012	—	White Fox
"Illuminate"	2014	43	Stories from the Surface
"Apollo"	2014	—	Stories from the Surface
"Fandango"	2015	—	Stories from the Surface
"Bodies"	2017	—	non-album singles
"Reactions"	2018	—	non-album singles
"Electro-Wave"	2021	—	Magnify
"Le Soleil"	2022	—	Magnify
"All My Blood"	2022	—	Magnify
"—" denotes a recording that did not chart or was not released in that territory.

== Awards ==
Organization	Year	Award	Result	Ref.
Meteor Music Awards	2008	Hope for 2008	Won	
Choice Music Prize	2015	Irish Album of the Year	Nominated	
