= Juno Falls =

- Origin: Dublin, Ireland
- Genres: folk pop
- Years active: 2003–present
- Labels: V2 Records, Unsigned
- Members: Myles O'Reilly (musician)
- Website: Junofalls.net

Juno Falls are a folk pop band from Dublin, Ireland.

== History ==
After forming in 2003, the group signed a publishing deal with Sony Music Publishing. A year later, they released their debut album Starlight Drive. The group then signed with V2 Records and released their sophomore album Weightless in 2007. Writing for AllMusic, Stewart Mason wrote "Unfortunately, just as Weightless was released in the U.K., Juno Falls' label, V2 Records, underwent a complete restructuring, meaning this fine, likable, and potentially commercially successful record largely disappeared upon its release."

== Discography ==
=== Albums ===
- Starlight Drive (2004) SN8 CD/LP
- Weightless (2007) V2 Records CD/LP
