= Magnify (album) =

Studio album by Ham Sandwich
- Released: September 30, 2022
- Recorded: 2021–2022
- Studio: Black Mountain Studios; Sun Studios
- Genre: Indie rock; Synth pop
- Label: Route 109A Records
- Producer: Michael Heffernan

Ham Sandwich chronology
Stories from the Surface (2015)	Magnify (2022)	The Live Album (2024)

Magnify is the fourth album from Irish rock band Ham Sandwich. It was released on 30 September 2022 and is the first album recorded by the band as a trio. The album received generally positive reviews and reached No. 11 on the Irish Album Chart.

== Production ==
Writing for the album began in 2020 during the COVID-19 pandemic, while the band's members were under lockdown restrictions, forcing them to collaborate remotely. The band initially planned to also record the album remotely, beginning with what would be the first single, "Electro-Wave". However, the delays that resulted from having to co-ordinate from different locations led the band to postpone recording until it was possible for the band to enter the studio together. This extra break before recording meant that the band spent more time refining the demo tracks than they typically would have done on previous albums.

The track "Good Friday" was released as a single to celebrate the band's 20th anniversary, with the title referencing the band's origins at a Good Friday party. As a tribute to the band's late manager, Derek Nally, the track also includes snippets of recordings of Nally speaking.

Magnified, an EP consisting of stripped down versions of 4 songs from the album, was released on May 21, 2023. It featured cellist Ailbhe McDonagh on all tracks.

== Reception ==
Professional ratings
Review scores
Source	Rating
Hot Press	7.5/10
Irish Examiner	4/5 stars
The Spill Magazine	4/5 stars
Fortitude Magazine	8/10 stars

On its release, Magnify peaked at 11 on the Irish album charts. It has received generally positive reviews in Ireland and the UK.

Kate Brayden, in a positive review for Hot Press, noted the new electronic influences in the band sound, as well as praising the band's signature dual vocals of Niamh Farrell and Podge MacNamee. Brayden singled out "Julian" and "Good Friday" as standout tracks, particularly the later for its poignant tribute to the band's late manager, Derek Nally. Farrell and MacNamee's vocals were also singled out by Ljubinko Zivkovic in a review for The Spill Magazine, who was also impressed by Brian Darcy's guitar work. Ed Power, writing for Irish Examiner, stated that the album was worth the wait after a seven-year gap since the band's previous album, and praised Farrell's vocals in particular on opening track "Electro-Wave".

== Track listing ==
All tracks are written by Ham Sandwich.

No.	Title	Length
1.	"Electro-Wave"	3:52
2.	"Julian"	3:34
3.	"Run Run"	3:37
4.	"Next Contender"	4:13
5.	"Le Soleil"	2:12
6.	"Fired Up"	3:44
7.	"Work of Art"	3:55
8.	"A Pact"	2:58
9.	"All My Blood"	3:12
10.	"Good Friday"	4:23
Total length:		35:44

== Personnel ==
Ham Sandwich

- Niamh Farrell – lead vocals, bass
- Podge McNamee – vocals, guitar, keyboards
- Brian Darcy – vocals, guitar, percussion, keyboards

Additional musicians

- Alex Borwick – banjo, mandolin, trombone
- Graham Heaney – bass
- Paul Kenny – drums
- Pat Daly – strings, harmonium

Production

- Michael Heffernan – production
- Justin Gerrish – mixing
- Emily Lazar – mastering
- Chris Allgood – mastering

== Charts ==
Chart (2022)	Peak position
Irish Album Chart	11
