= In Between Thoughts...A New World =

Studio album by Rodrigo y Gabriela
- Released: 21 April 2023
- Length: 32:51
- Label: ATO
- Producer: Rodrigo y Gabriela

Rodrigo y Gabriela chronology
Mettavolution (2019)	In Between Thoughts...A New World (2023)

Professional ratings
Aggregate scores
Source	Rating
Metacritic	86/100
Review scores
Source	Rating
AllMusic	4.5/5 stars

In Between Thoughts...A New World is the sixth studio album by Mexican duo Rodrigo y Gabriela. It was released on 21 April 2023 through ATO Records. The album includes electric guitar elements as well as influences from jazz and classical music, in addition to the duo's established all-acoustic guitar sound. There are also contributions from the Bulgarian Symphony Orchestra, with string arrangements by Austrian composer Adam Ilyas Kuruc. The album was inspired by Rodrigo Sánchez's studies of the philosophy of nondualism as he recovered from COVID-19 in 2020, and the duo's interest in the Hindu philosophy of Advaita Vedanta. It was produced at the duo's home studio in Ixtapa, Mexico.

== Critical reception ==
The album received mostly positive reviews from music critics. According to Thom Jurek of AllMusic, "The creative vision behind In Between Thoughts...A New World is at once ambitious and mercurial." Chris Conaton of PopMatters called the album "compact and entertaining", and noted that Rodrigo Sánchez's experiments with electric guitar added some new elements to the duo's sound, while Gabriela Quintero's continuing acoustic guitar work grounds the album in their established repertoire. Aimee Ferrier of Far Out called the album "a virtuosic display of Rodrigo y Gabriela's impeccable guitar playing" and noted the duo's ability to craft instrumental songs that "tell intricate stories without saying a word."

Ryan Dillon of Glide Magazine offered a somewhat mixed review, claiming that the album's arrangements are cluttered "like a star-studded action film" but concluding that Rodrigo y Gabriela "provide us with a soundtrack that brings us along on their spiritual journey with the perfect balance of god-like musicianship and humanizing experiences." Jacob Lenz-Avila of Mxdwn mostly praised the album, but added that "the record's production evokes a free music library that comes with video editing software."

== Track listing ==
All tracks are written by Gabriela Quintero & Rodrigo Sánchez.

No.	Title	Length
1.	"True Nature"	3:22
2.	"The Eye that Catches the Dream"	4:14
3.	"Egoland"	3:36
4.	"Descending to Nowhere"	3:29
5.	"Seeking Unreality"	3:12
6.	"The Ride of the Mind"	3:20
7.	"Broken Rage"	3:13
8.	"Finding Myself Leads Me to You"	4:10
9.	"In Between Thoughts...A New World"	4:15
Total length:		32:51
