= The Minutes (band) =

Irish musical group

- Origin: Dublin, Ireland
- Genres: Garage; Rock; Blues
- Years active: 2006–present
- Label: Model Citizen Records
- Members: Mark Austin; Tom Cosgrave; Shane Kinsella
- Website: theminutesmusic.com

The Minutes are a three-piece rock band from Dublin, Ireland consisting of Mark Austin, Tom Cosgrave and Shane Kinsella. Début album Marcata was released on 20 May 2011 in Ireland.

== History (2006 - present) ==
The Minutes were formed in 2006 in Dublin, Ireland. Some of the band members previously played together under the name Stars of the City. Songs like Armour, The Summer That Went Too Soon and Sing Me to My Sleep showed us a much gentlier and perhaps more vulnerable side to the band before they grew to find their more stoic and selfassured sound as The Minutes. After several years of performing live in Dublin, the band recorded their debut album in October 2009 at Marcata Recordings in Upstate New York. Together with producer Kevin McMahon, the band recorded a ten-track album that replicated the highlights of their live performances, including "Secret History", "Believer" and "In my Time of Dying".

On 3 March 2011, The Minutes appeared on Other Voices on RTÉ Two television in Ireland performing two of their songs off their debut album.

On Saturday 19 March 2011 they appeared on The Saturday Night Show, performing their single "Black Keys".

Their debut album Marcata was released on 20 May 2011 in Ireland.

The Minutes performed at the Eurosonic Festival in 2012 when Ireland was the "Spotlight Country".

Irish musician and DJ Rob Smith said that the band were "one of, if not then the finest rock & roll band to have ever come out of Ireland" in a 2013 interview.

Paul McLoone, a radio presenter with the Irish national and independent radio station, Today FM and also the frontman for the Northern Irish band, The Undertones who is also friends with the Minutes appeared in the video for the Minutes's single, "Cherry Bomb", playing an unnamed Elvis Impersonator with the video itself being released in March 2014.

== Touring ==
The band have toured extensively in Ireland and the UK with Albert Hammond Jnr The Strokes, The Pigeon Detectives, The Von Bondies, Supergrass and Flogging Molly. Soon after a year long residency at Dublin's live music staple, Whelans in 2009 The Minutes headed off to Marcata Recordings in upstate New York to record their debut album with producer Kevin McMahon. This was followed by a critically acclaimed performance at SXSW in Texas in March 2010. In November 2010, they supported The Parlotones in the O2 Shepherd's Bush Empire, London and, in December 2010, they supported Black Rebel Motorcycle Club in Belfast.

=== Touring 2011 ===
- 19 January Supported The Phantom Band in Whelans, Dublin.
- 17 February Supported Mona in Whelans.
- 20 March Supported The Wombats in The Academy, Dublin.
- 9–24 April Supported Fight Like Apes on their tour of Ireland.
- May Great Escape Festival Brighton, England
- June Supported The Cult on both Dublin shows
- June Irish Tour
- 8–10 July played Oxegen.
- 30 July played Castlepalooza, Tullamore.
- August Reading & Leeds Festivals UK
- 23–24 August Supporting Flogging Molly in Dublin & Belfast.
- September Electric Picnic Festival Ireland
- 15 October played Whelans, Dublin T
- October Irish Tour
- CMJ Festival NYC
- 22–23 October Supporting Noel Gallagher's High Flying Birds Dublin, Olympia
- November - Extensive European tour supporting Flogging Molly
- December Headline German tour
- First official UK headline show, London

== Band members ==
- Mark Austin - Lead Vocals & Rhythm Guitar
- Tom Cosgrave - Bass & Backing vocals
- Shane Kinsella - Drums & Backing vocals

== Discography ==
The Minutes discography
- Studio albums: 2
- Extended plays: 1
- Singles: 7
- Music videos: 5

Year	Album details	Peak chart positions
Year	Album details	IRL
2011	Marcata: Released: 20 May 2011; Label: Model Citizen Records; Formats: CD, Download	16
2014	Live Well, Change Often: Released: 9 May 2014; Label: Model Citizen Records; Formats: CD, Download	12
"—" denotes a title that did not chart.

=== Singles ===
Year	Title	Peak chart position	Album
Year	Title	IRL	Album
2008	"Harmonic"	36	Non-album Singles
2009	"Black Keys"	—	Marcata
2010	"Secret History"	—	Marcata
2010	"Fleetwood"	—	Marcata
2011	"Black Keys" (re-release)	—	Marcata
2011	"Fleetwood" (re-release)	—	Marcata
2012	"Heartbreaker"	—	Marcata
2014	"Cherry Bomb"	—	Live Well, Change Often
2014	"Supernatural"	—	Live Well, Change Often
"—" denotes a title that did not chart.

== Awards and nominations ==
Year	Nominee / work	Award	Result
2010	IMTV Awards	Best Group Video	Won
2011	Tunebreaker Awards	Best Newcomer	Nominated
2011	IMTV Awards	Best Live Video	Won
2011	IMTV Awards	Best Group Video	Won
