= Stories from the Surface =

Studio album by Ham Sandwich
- Released: April 17, 2015
- Recorded: 2014
- Studio: Windmill Lane Studios
- Genre: Indie rock
- Length: 39:31
- Label: Route 109A Records
- Producer: Karl Odlum

Ham Sandwich chronology
White Fox (2010)	Stories from the Surface (2015)	Magnify (2022)

Professional ratings
Review scores
Source	Rating
Hot Press	4.5/5 stars
The Irish Times	3/5 stars
State	4/5 stars

Stories from the Surface is the third album from Irish rock band Ham Sandwich. It was released in Ireland on 17 April 2015, and was produced by the band's long-time collaborator Karl Odlum. "Illuminate" was the band's first single to chart in Ireland, reaching 43 in the Irish music charts. The album has received mostly positive reviews in the band's native Ireland and went straight to first place in the Irish charts on its first week of release, becoming the band's first album to reach the top 20.

== Track listing ==
=== Standard edition ===
All tracks are written by Ham Sandwich.

No.	Title	Length
1.	"Hold Me Up"	4:26
2.	"Apollo"	3:25
3.	"Square 3"	4:55
4.	"Illuminate"	3:40
5.	"Fandango"	4:02
6.	"In Perfect Rhymes"	4:12
7.	"To Replicate"	4:01
8.	"Broken (Start Over)"	3:45
9.	"Satellite"	4:03
10.	"All Worthwhile"	3:01
Total length:		39:31

=== Deluxe edition ===
No.	Title	Length
11.	"Ants" (live at Christchurch)	5:00
12.	"Apollo" (live at Christchurch)	4:41
13.	"Broken (Start Over)" (live at Christchurch)	4:14
14.	"Illuminate" (live at Christchurch)	4:47
15.	"All Worthwhile" (single version)	2:57
Total length:		1:01:10

== Personnel ==
Ham Sandwich

- Podge McNamee - lead vocals, guitar
- Niamh Farrell - lead vocals
- Brian Darcy - guitar
- David McEnroe - bass
- Ollie Murphy - drums

Additional musicians

- Sarah Lynch, Pat Daly, Kim Porcelli - strings
- Donagh Molloy - brass

Production

- Karl Odlum - production
- Greg Calbi - mastering
- Danny Kalb - mixing
- Alan Clarke, Steve Averill - album artwork

== Charts ==
Chart (2015)	Peak position
Irish Album Chart	1

== Accolades ==
Organization	Year	Award	Result	Ref.
Choice Music Prize	2015	Irish Album of the Year	Nominated	
