= Myles O'Reilly (musician) =

Irish musician and filmmaker

- Occupations: Musician, filmmaker
- Years active: 2003-present
- Website: arbutusyarns.net

Myles O'Reilly is an Irish musician and film-maker.

== Career ==
O'Reilly began performing in the group Juno Falls in 2003. The group were signed to V2 Records and released two albums, Starlight Drive (2004) and Weightless (2007).

From 2009 onward, O'Reilly directed music videos and documentary films featuring Irish folk and traditional musicians.

Since 2021, O'Reilly has collaborated with Rónán Ó Snodaigh, co-producing the albums Tá Go Maith (2021) and The Beautiful Road (2023).

In 2025, O'Reilly collaborated with President of Ireland Michael D. Higgins on Against All Certainty, a spoken-word ambient album combining Higgins' poetry with ambient musical arrangements.

== Discography ==
=== Albums ===
- Cocooning Heart (2022)
- Midland Loops for Sleepy Hedgerows (2024)
- Asleep in the Waiting Room (2024)
- Music from the Threshold (2024)
- The Parapet of Sita's Longing (2025)

=== Collaborations ===
- Tá Go Maith (with Rónán Ó Snodaigh) (2021)
- The Beautiful Road (with Rónán Ó Snodaigh) (2023)
- Against All Certainty (with Michael D. Higgins) (2025)

=== With Juno Falls ===
- Starlight Drive (2004)
- Weightless (2007)

== Documentary films ==
- Backwards to Go Forwards (2019)
- Come On Up to the House (2019)
- This Ain't No Disco EP IV (2018)
- Sister India (2018)
- This Ain't No Disco EP III (2018)
- This Ain't No Disco EP II (2017)
- This Little Light of Mine (2017)
- My Ireland (2017)
- This Ain't No Disco EP I (2016)
- Glen Hansard Didn't He Ramble (2015)
- The Sound of a Country (2015)
- The Greatest Busk on Grafton Street (2017)
