= Carry the Meek =

Studio album by Ham Sandwich
- Released: 15 February 2008
- Recorded: 2006–07
- Studio: JAM Studios (Kells, County Meath) and Headfort House (Kells, County Meath)
- Genre: Indie rock
- Length: 41:29
- Label: Route 109A Records
- Producer: Karl Odlum

Ham Sandwich chronology
Carry the Meek (2008)	White Fox (2010)

Carry the Meek is the debut album by Irish band Ham Sandwich. It was released on 18 February 2008 and has received average to favourable reviews. It didn't initially appear on streaming platforms, being released across them on 18th April 2023 for the band's 20th anniversary

== Production ==
Ham Sandwich had been performing live for several years and had already released several singles before beginning work on their first album in 2006. Carry the Meek was recorded starting at JAM Studios, Kells with Producer Martin Quinn and also in a home-made studio at Headfort House in their home-town of Kells, produced by Karl Odlum and mastered by Fred Kevorkian. The album was released on 15 February 2008 on the band's own label, Route 109A Records. On the day that the album was released the band won the Hope for 2008 Award at the Meteor Music Awards.

The artwork for the album was designed with the help of the band's fans, who were encouraged to send the band their photographs on the theme of heartbreak.

== Reception ==
Professional ratings
Review scores
Source	Rating
Hot Press	4/5 stars
RTÉ.ie	4/5 stars
entertainment.ie	2/5 stars
Irish Independent	4/5 stars

Upon its release the album peaked at 23 on the Irish album charts. Reviews from the Irish media were generally positive.

Patrick Freyne of Hot Press gave the album 4 out of 5 stars, saying "Generally the tracks have a real heart tugging quality to them, with rising melodies and great musical diversions as middle eighths – the band really know how to build a song to an epic climax", singling out the vocal interplay between McNamee and Farrell as the band's "secret weapon". Harry Guerin writing for RTÉ Entertainment gave an equally positive review, declaring that "Ham Sandwich turn in as assured and alluring a debut as you'll get".

A less positive review by Lauren Murphy of entertainment.ie gave the album 2 out of 5 stars, saying that "Carry the Meek is a disappointing, characterless album that offers little or no sense of individuality. Like a ham sandwich, it fills a void and will do for the time being - but sometimes, you need to sink your teeth into something a bit more nutritious".

== Track listing ==
All tracks are written by Ham Sandwich.

No.	Title	Length
1.	"St. Christopher"	4:43
2.	"Keepsake"	3:21
3.	"Click...Click...Boom!"	3:20
4.	"Never Talk"	4:29
5.	"Words"	3:48
6.	"Broken Glass"	3:41
7.	"Sad Songs"	4:40
8.	"Sleep"	4:37
9.	"Ashes"	3:36
10.	"Thru the Grass"	5:14
Total length:		41:29

== Personnel ==
Ham Sandwich

- Niamh Farrell - lead vocals
- Podge McNamee - lead vocals, guitar
- Brian Darcy - guitar
- John Moore - bass
- Ollie Murphy - drums

Production

- Karl Odlum - production
- Martin Quinn - engineering

== Charts ==
Chart (2008)	Peak position
Irish Album Chart	23
