= Rodrigo y Gabriela =

Mexican guitar duo

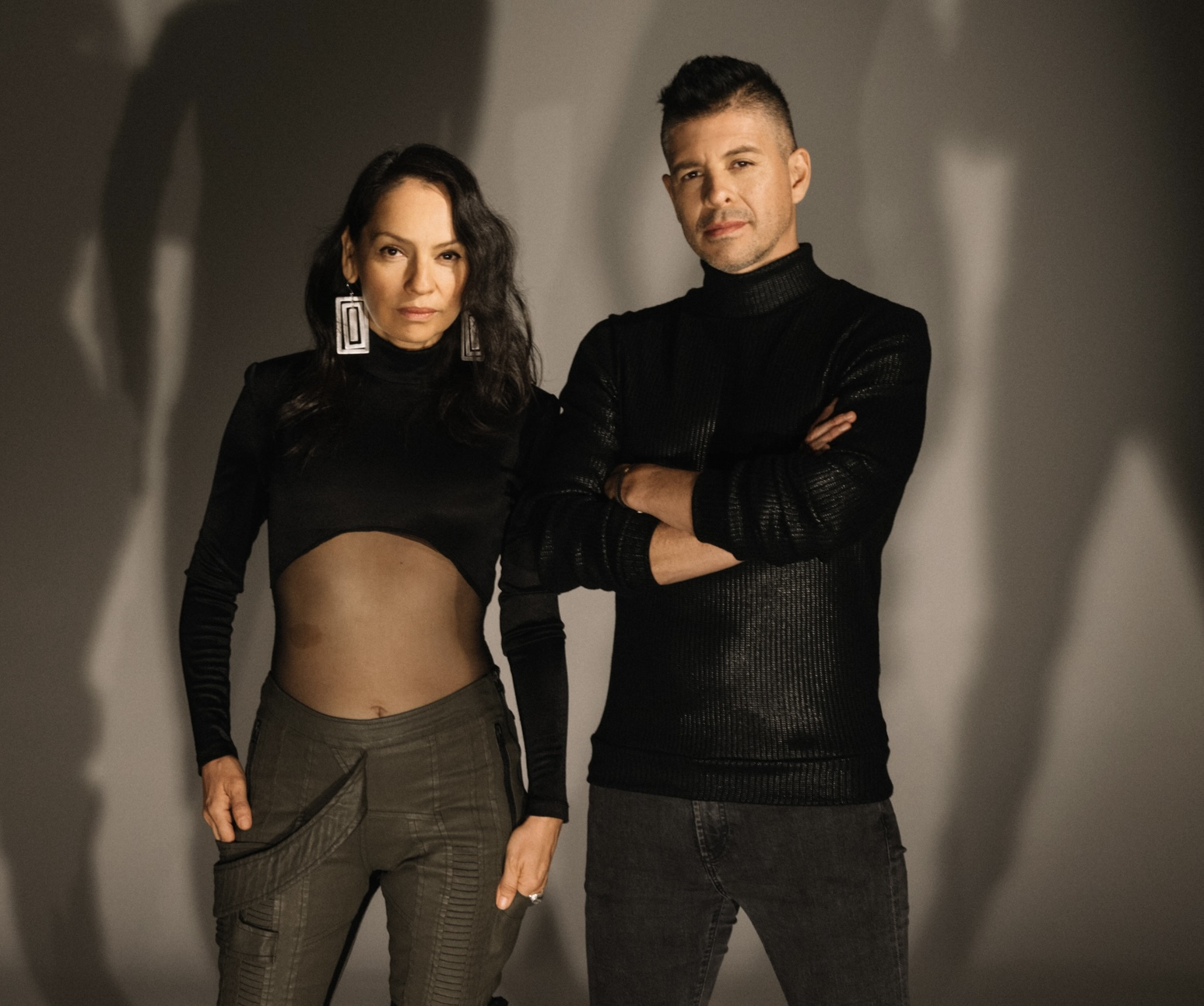
- Rodrigo y Gabriela in 2025

Background information
- Origin: Mexico City, Mexico
- Genres: Acoustic, instrumental rock
- Years active: 2000–present
- Labels: Rubyworks, ATO
- Members: Rodrigo Sánchez; Gabriela Quintero
- Website: rodgab.com

Rodrigo y Gabriela ([roˈð̞ɾi.ɣ̞o i ɡaˈβ̞ɾje.la], "Rodrigo and Gabriela") are a Mexican acoustic guitar duo featuring musicians Rodrigo Sánchez and Gabriela Quintero. Residing in Mexico City, they began their career in Dublin, Ireland, where they played for the first eight years of their career as a duo. Their music consists largely of instrumental duets on the flamenco guitar, with a musical style influenced by a number of genres including nuevo flamenco, rock, and heavy metal.

They have released numerous studio albums, including Mettavolution in 2020 which won a Grammy Award for the Best Contemporary Instrumental Album at the 62nd Annual Grammy Awards. Their most recent album, In Between Thoughts…A New World, was released in April 2023. They have toured internationally and performed at venues that include Red Rocks Amphitheatre and for President Barack Obama at The White House.

== Career ==
=== Origins ===
Rodrigo Sánchez (born 9 January 1974) and Gabriela Quintero (born 11 June 1973) grew up in middle-class families in Mexico City. Their parents listened to flamenco, jazz, and rock music, and they both enjoyed heavy metal bands like Metallica, which later proved influential to Rodrigo and Gabriela.

Sánchez and Quintero met at the age of 15, at 'la casa de la cultura' (house of culture) in Mexico City, where Sánchez's brother was the director. Quintero was in a drama class and at the suggestion of Sánchez brother, he met up with her. She remembers "this 15-year-old boy there, dressed in all black ... with messy hair. Yet he was different to the other metal-heads his age: he seemed very serious and didn't drink or smoke". The two bonded over their interest in music and they soon became a couple.

=== 1993–2001; Tierra Ácida ===
In the early 1990s, Sánchez formed a heavy metal band called Tierra Ácida (Acid Earth) with his brother. Quintero joined them in 1993 "as they couldn't get a guitarist who would please Rodrigo". When a record deal for the band fell through in 1997, Sánchez and Quintero left Mexico City for the resort town of Ixtapa on the Pacific coast of Mexico. They played in beach-side bars and hotels for nine months where "we wanted to play a different kind of music, something we could make as our own".

Sánchez and Quintero dated for many years before ending their relationship (but not their musical partnership) in 2012. "We're now better friends by far," said Quintero. "We no longer behave like 15-year-olds and it's allowed us to grow up."

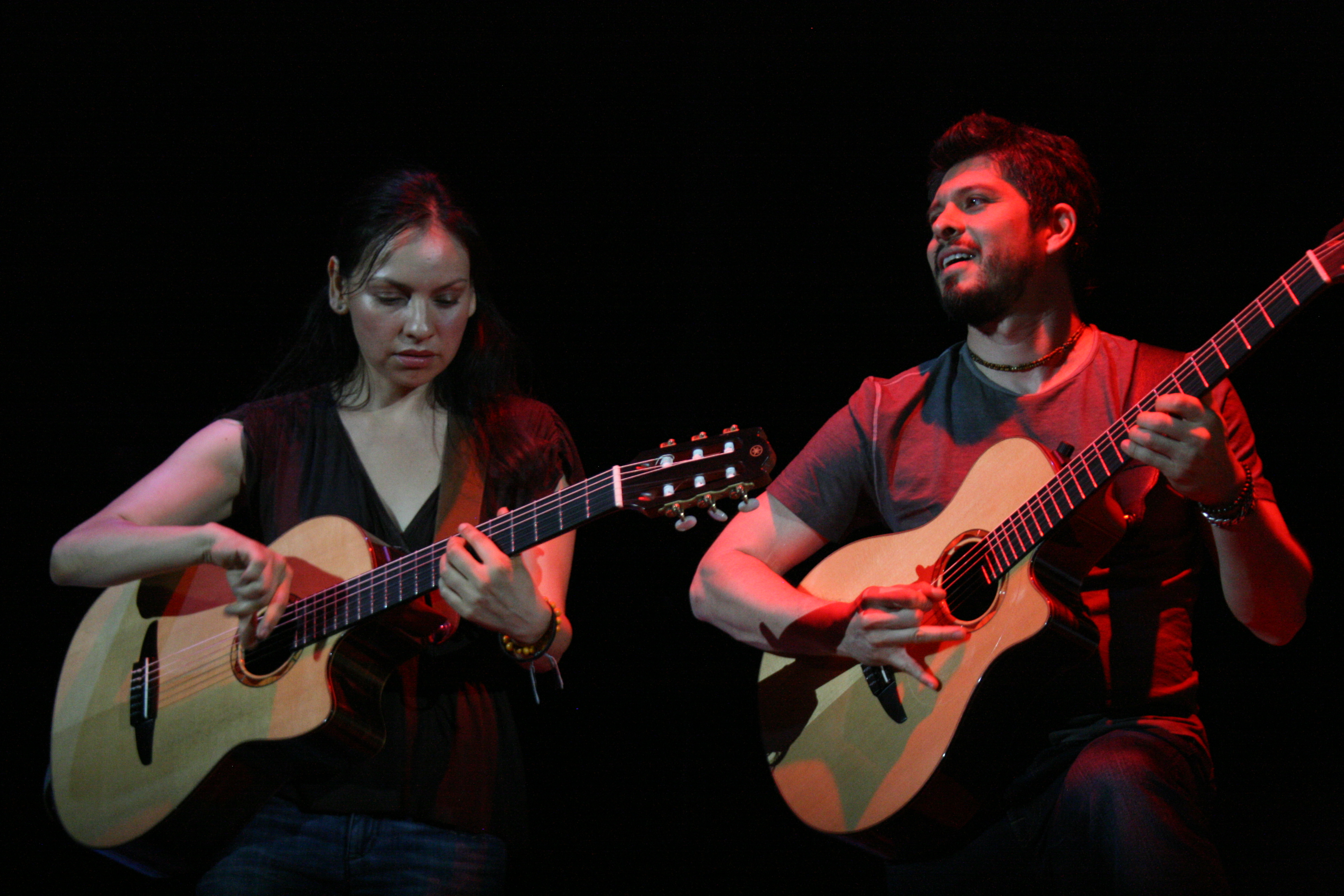
Rodrigo y Gabriela in concert at Red Rocks Amphitheatre

Growing frustrated with the limited scope of the domestic Mexican rock scene, the duo moved to Europe. After travelling around, they took up residence in Dublin, Ireland, in 1999, despite not speaking any English. Playing live gigs in various pubs and busking on Grafton Street where they began to play "many cover songs, which we enjoyed. Then we began to put in our own songs, and we've built up our repertoire from there". They became friends with fellow musician Damien Rice who invited them to open for several of his shows. He also introduced the duo to Niall Muckian, who became their manager. In the first half of 2001 they recorded a 9-track demo called Foc of their own material supplemented by some covers, also featuring an appearance by Zoe Conway.

=== 2002–2008; re-Foc and Rodrigo y Gabriela ===
As interest in the band grew, it was decided to re-record the songs on the demo as re-Foc in 2002 with a number of friends, including Lisa Hannigan who provided vocal stylings and Conway, who by now also was a feature of the live set-up of the duo. The album appeared on Muckian's own Rubyworks Records as he found that "because it is all instrumental, we found it hard to get major-label interest or any radio-play, so I put it out myself". As interest grew, the duo were offered further support-slots, which resulted in an eight-track live-album recorded in Dublin and Manchester, released in 2004. They toured with David Gray on his 2005 European tour, leading to a record deal with ATO Records the same year.

The album, Rodrigo y Gabriela, entered the Irish Albums Chart at #1 beating Arctic Monkeys and Johnny Cash to the top spot. It was released internationally on March 13, 2006, having been given an earlier Irish release. Rodrigo y Gabriela, which was produced by John Leckie, includes covers of Led Zeppelin's "Stairway to Heaven" and Metallica's "Orion". The duo lists Metallica as being among their key influences, alongside other heavy metal bands such as Megadeth, Slayer, Testament and Overkill. The other tracks are original works inspired by the places they have been and the people they have met.

The duo had their national American TV debut on Late Show with David Letterman on December 18, 2006, performing "Diablo Rojo". Their song "Tamacun" featured in the pilot episode of AMC's Breaking Bad in January 2008. Live in Japan was released on October 20, 2008, in the United Kingdom, and includes 14 tracks, and a bonus DVD containing five videos. The Led Zeppelin cover can be found on the album Rhythms del Mundo Classics. Their feature on MTV gave them a huge boost in popularity in the United States. This led to a feature on Nightmare Revisited, a tribute album to Danny Elfman's music from Tim Burton's The Nightmare Before Christmas. The duo performed an instrumental version of "Oogie Boogie's Song".

=== 2009–2013; 11:11 and Area52 ===
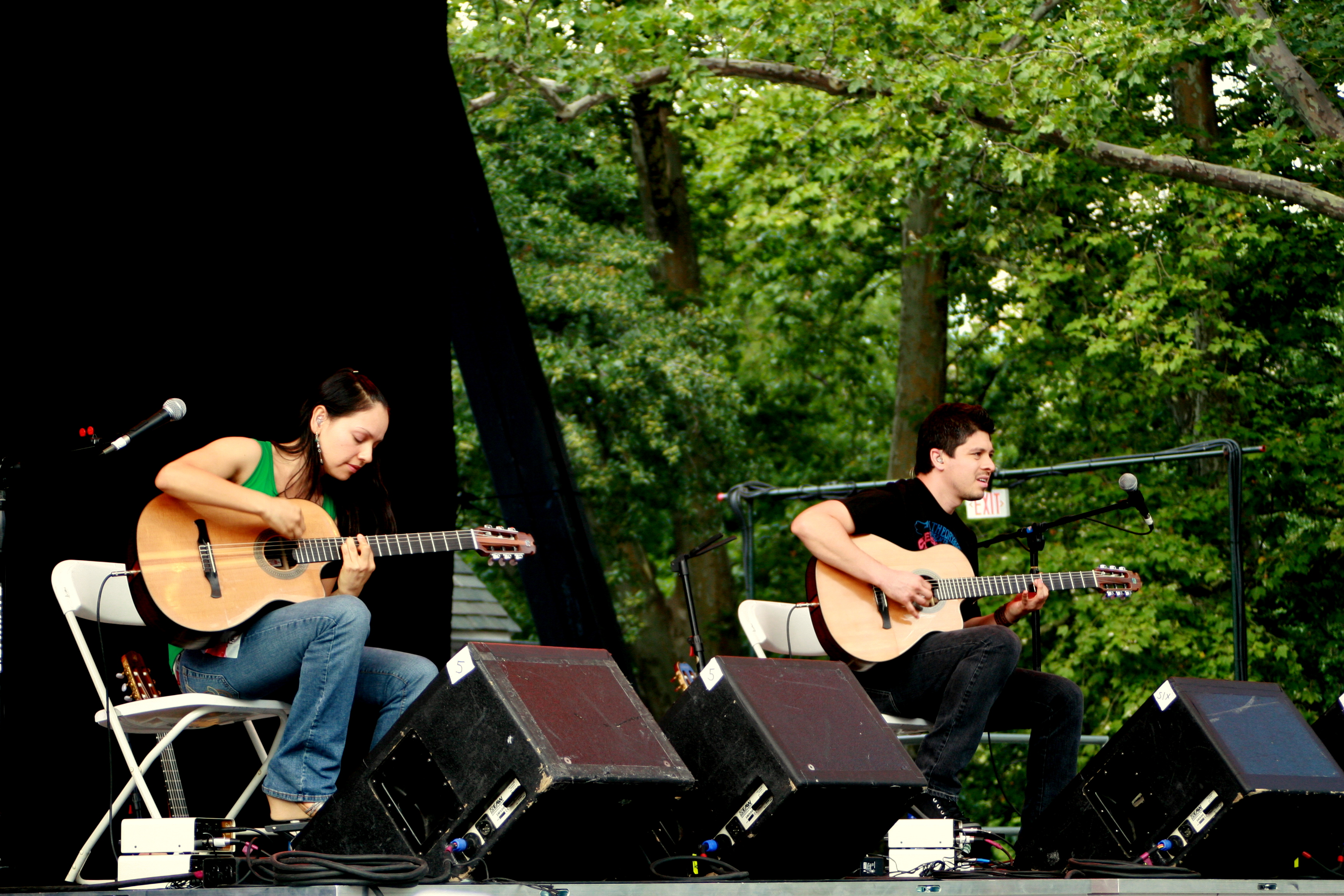
Rodrigo y Gabriela performing in concert at Central Park SummerStage in Central Park, New York on July 1, 2007

They released a new album, 11:11, in September, 2009. Alex Skolnick of Testament guests on the album, as do Strunz & Farah. Upon the release of the new album, they received much mainstream American popularity and were the featured music on Monday Night Football on October 12, 2009, as they celebrated Latino Heritage Month.

Their song "Santo Domingo" was chosen as the Starbucks iTunes Pick of the Week for November 10, 2009. The duo was the musical guest on The Late Late Show with Craig Ferguson that aired on CBS-TV on October 28, 2009, and was re-run on December 29, 2009. They performed "Buster Voodoo". They performed on Jools Holland's Annual Hootenanny on December 31, 2009.

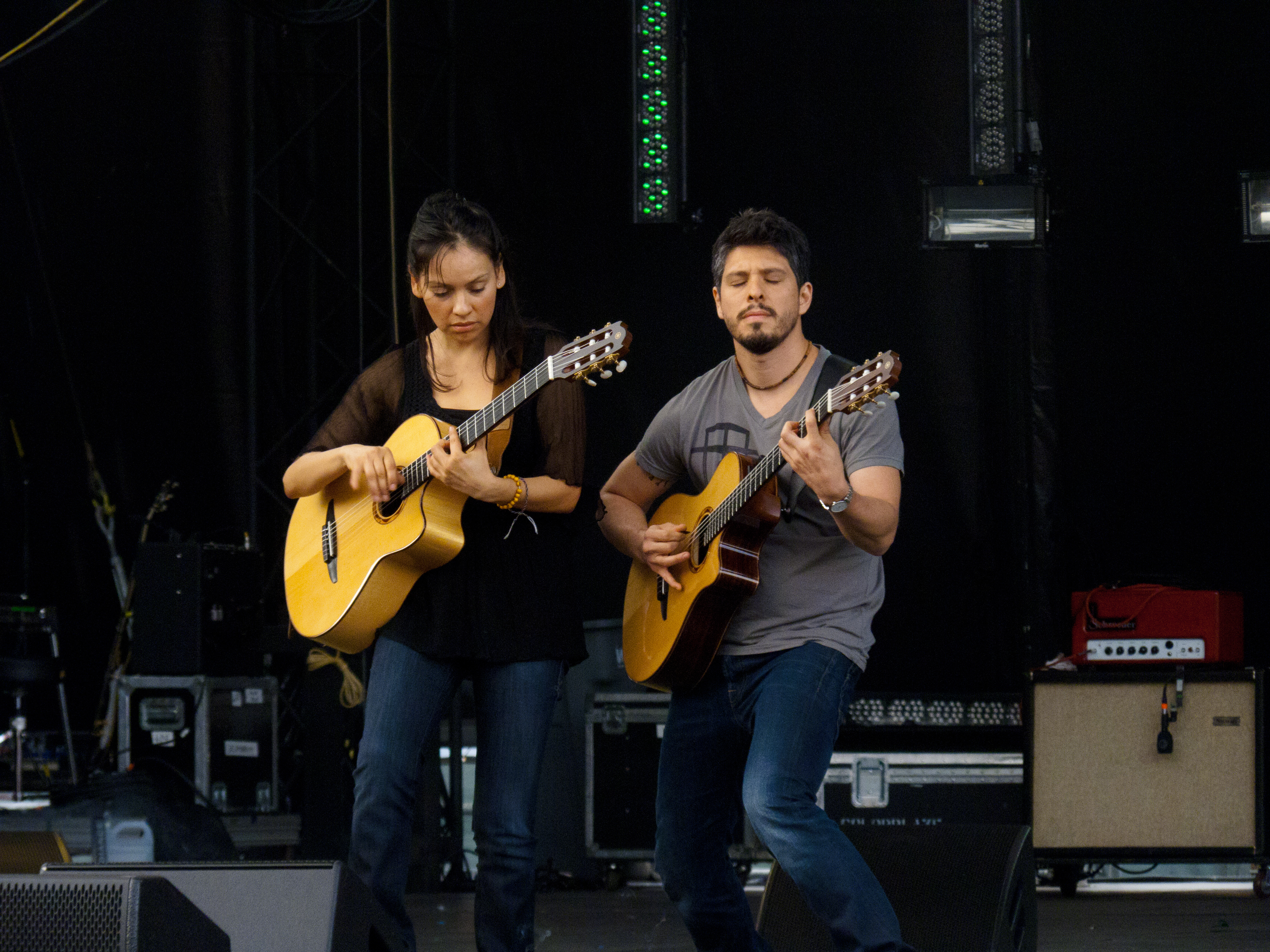
Rodrigo y Gabriela performing at the Sasquatch! Music Festival in Washington State, on May 30, 2011

The duo was the musical guest on The Tonight Show with Jay Leno that aired on NBC on March 23, 2010, to promote their album 11:11 and on Lopez Tonight which aired on TBS March 25, 2010. They headlined the West Holts stage on the Sunday night at Glastonbury 2010 and played the King Tuts Tent at T In The Park on 10 July 2010. They also had a spot on the main stage at Latitude festival that same July and they managed to draw in a huge crowd. They also performed at The White House for President Barack Obama in 2010.

In 2010, Rodrigo y Gabriela contributed a live version of their song "Hora Zero" to the Enough Project and Downtown Records' Raise Hope for Congo compilation. Proceeds from the compilation fund efforts to make the protection and empowerment of Congo's women a priority, as well as inspire individuals around the world to raise their voice for peace in the Congo.

They played the Nice Jazz Festival on 23 July 2010, and the McMenamin's Edgefield outdoor concert in Portland, Oregon on August 14, 2010, as well as the Ravinia Festival on August 28, 2010, and The Tonight Show with Jay Leno on September 30, 2010. In September, 2010, the duo announced a hiatus from touring due to stress injuries caused by Gabriela's heavily percussive style of playing. However, they did manage to play five sold-out nights at Shepherd's Bush in London.

On January 20, 2011, Rodrigo y Gabriela entered the studio with Hans Zimmer to write and record sessions of the score from Pirates of the Caribbean: On Stranger Tides. The soundtrack was released on May 17, 2011, three days before the film's general release. On July 9, 2011, Rodrigo Y Gabriela performed a live set for Guitar Center Sessions on DirecTV. The episode included an interview with program host, Nic Harcourt. On July 25, 2011, Rodrigo y Gabriela released another live album entitled Live in France. Rodrigo y Gabriela were featured in the 2011 DreamWorks film Puss in Boots, scored by Henry Jackman. During 2011, Rodrigo y Gabriela recorded in Havana, Cuba, with C.U.B.A., a 13-piece Cuban orchestra, and special guest musicians (Anoushka Shankar on sitar and Le Trio Joubran on oud).

In January 2012, they released Area 52, their first album backed by other musicians. The tracks on the album are mostly re-worked versions of songs that have appeared on their duo albums, Rodrigo y Gabriela and 11:11. Reviews were mixed, with some tracks criticised for the backing band drowning out the guitar work that fans love but others praised where the guitar workouts "are allowed space to breathe by lighter salsa-style backing".

In January 2013, the duo appeared on an episode of the hour-long PBS music program Austin City Limits, which showed them in performance at the Moody Theater in Austin, Texas.

=== 2014–present ===
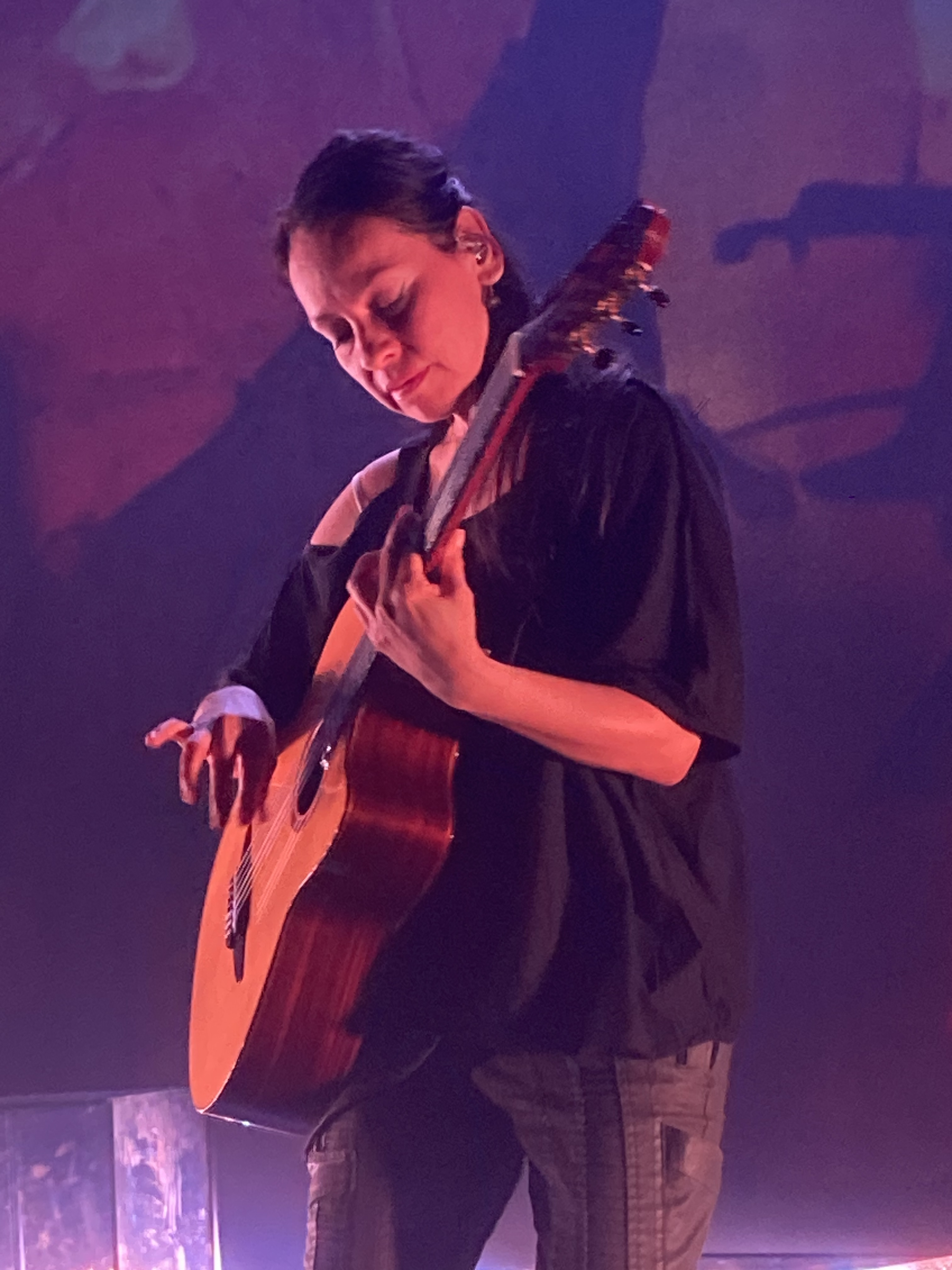
Gabriela playing at Radiant-Bellevue, near Lyon, France, in 2023

In April 2014, Rodrigo y Gabriela released their fourth studio album, entitled 9 Dead Alive, their first original studio album since 2009. They also toured internationally playing at venues such as Royal Albert Hall, Glastonbury Festival 2014, and the Montreux Jazz Festival. They played at the Sydney Opera House in 2015 and marked their first performance in India at the 2015 Bacardi NH7 Weekender Festival. Rodrigo y Gabriela toured with John Mayer in 2017, opening for his The Search for Everything World Tour in South America.

Their fifth studio album Mettavolution was released by ATO Records on April 26, 2019 and includes a cover of the Pink Floyd song "Echoes". They also performed the song on Jimmy Kimmel Live! the same year. In January 2020, Mettavolution won a Grammy Award for 'Best Contemporary Instrumental Album' 62nd Annual Grammy Awards. The song peaked at No. 2 on the Billboard's Rock Albums chart and No. 10 on the Top Albums chart.

In 2021, the duo contributed a cover of the Metallica song "The Struggle Within" to the charity tribute album The Metallica Blacklist. The cover earned them a Grammy nomination for "Best Arrangement, Instrumental Or A Cappella." They also signed with Shelter Music Group for management in 2021.

In 2023, Rodrigo y Gabriela played Austin City Limits with the Austin City Orchestra. This was the first time Austin City Limits featured the orchestra. They performed with Jools Holland's Rhythm and Blues Orchestra the same year.

Rodrigo y Gabriela released their sixth studio album, In Between Thoughts…A New World, on April 21, 2023. They had a world tour the same year to promote the album, playing in venues such as Red Rocks Amphitheatre, Auditorium Parco della Musica, and at the 2023 Montreal International Jazz Festival.

In June 2026, the duo released "Monster" as the lead single for their album OurHome; the accompanying music video features art by Naoki Urasawa, author and illustrator of the manga series of the same name. The album was released on September 18, 2026. The album was self-produced at NK Sound in Tokyo and features multiple guest musicians, including former Megadeth lead guitarist Marty Friedman and Japanese jazz pianist Hiromi.

== Awards and nominations ==
Year	Ceremony	Category	Nominated work	Result
2010	NAACP Image Awards	Outstanding World Music Album	Self	Nominated
2020	Grammy Awards	Best Contemporary Instrumental Album	Mettavolution	Won
2022	Grammy Awards	Best Arrangement, Instrumental or A Cappella	"The Struggle Within"	Nominated

== Discography ==
=== Self-released albums ===
- Foc (April 2001)

=== Studio albums ===
Year	Album	Peak positions								
Year	Album	AUS	BEL (Fl)	BEL (Wa)	FRA	IRE	NED	SWI	UK	US
2002	re-Foc	—	—	—	—	—	—	—	—	—
2006	Rodrigo y Gabriela	99	—	—	70	1	—	90	53	98
2009	11:11	80	12	27	20	9	—	55	46	34
2012	Area 52 (Rodrigo y Gabriela & C.U.B.A.)	—	29	86	59	26	72	74	50	63
2014	9 Dead Alive	—	39	49	42	24	—	73	39	22
2019	Mettavolution	—	—	—	79	—	—	95	46	71
2023	In Between Thoughts… A New World	—	—	—	—	—	—	—	—	—
2026	OurHome									
"—" denotes a recording that did not chart or was not released in that territory.

=== Live albums ===
Year	Album	Peak positions			
Year	Album	IRE	FRA	NED	SWI
2004	Live: Manchester and Dublin	11	—	—	—
2008	Live in Japan	48	99	—	—
2011	Live in France	16	70	96	65
"—" denotes a recording that did not chart or was not released in that territory.

=== Extended plays ===
Title	Details	Notes
Live Session	Released: 31 July 2007; Label: ATO Records; Formats: streaming	
Mettal	Released: 29 November 2020; Label: ATO Records; Formats: Vinyl	
Jazz	Released: 7 May 2021; Label: ATO Records; Formats: CD, Vinyl	

== Select tours ==
- 11:11 Tour (2009)
- Rodrigo y Gabriela and C.U.B.A. (2012)
- Rodrigo y Gabriela World Tour (2016)
- Tenth Anniversary Tour (2017)
- Mettavolution Tour (2019)
- By Request (2021)
- In Between Thoughts...A New World, The 2023 Tour (2023)
- Rodrigo y Gabriela Live in Concert (2024)
