= Irish Music Television Awards =

An Irish Music Television (or IMTV) Video Music Award is an accolade bestowed upon the Irish video makers, directors and artists involved in producing the best music videos from Northern Ireland and the Republic of Ireland during the previous year. The awards have been given annually at a ceremony in Dublin since 2009, organised by the website IrishMusic.TV (IMTV) with sponsorship from the Irish Music Rights Organisation (IMRO).

== Recipients ==
Year	Award	Artist(s)	Video	Director(s)
2009	Most Original Concept	Fight Like Apes	"Something Global"	Eoghan Kidney
2009	Best Solo Male Video	Pearse McGloughlin	"Ways To Kill A Werewolf"	Kevin McGloughlin
2009	Best Solo Female Video	Wallis Bird	"To My Bones"	Philipp Kaessbohrer
2009	Best Live Video	And So I Watch You From Afar	"Set Guitars To Kill"	Will McConnell
2009	Best Dance Video	Le Galaxie	"You Feel The Fire"	Killian Broderick, Le Galaxie
2009	Best Styled Video	Julie Feeney	"Impossibly Beautiful"	Vittoria Colonna
2009	Best Production Effects	Cap Pas Cap	"We Are Men"	Sam Boyd
2009	Best Video By A Newcomer	Bowlegged	"Red Lights"	Peter J. McCarthy
2009	Best Director	–	–	Eoghan Kidney
2009	Video Of The Year	Valerie Francis	"Punches"	Eoghan Kidney
2010	Best Group Video	The Minutes	"Fleetwood"	Philip Kelly
2010	Most Original Concept	The Ambience Affair	"Devil In The Detail"	Souljacker
2010	Best Male	The Mighty Stef	"Thank Christ for the Kids"	Jessie Ward, Susie Morrell
2010	Best Female	Cathy Davey	"Little Red"	Lorcan Finnegan
2010	Best Live Video	Primordial	"Empire Falls"	
2010	Best Styled Video	The Coronas	"Far From here"	Simon Eustace
2010	Sexiest Video	The Rubberbandits	"Bag Of Glue"	
2010	Best Production Effects	Shit Robot	"Take 'Em Up"	Eoghan Kidney
2010	Best Director	–	–	Myles O'Reilly (musician)
2010	Viewers Choice	The Gorgeous Colours	"The Creatures Down Below"	Stevie Russell
2010	Video of the Year	The Ambience Affair	"Devil In The Detail"	Souljacker
2011	Best Group	The Minutes	"Black Keys"	Biba Logan
2011	Most Original Concept	Ham Sandwich	"ANTS"	Marc Corrigan
2011	Best Male Video	James Vincent McMorrow	"Sparrow and the Wolf"	John Phillipson, Elton Mullally, Rob Davis
2011	Best Female Video	Lisa Hannigan	"Knots"	Myles O'Reilly (musician)
2011	Best Live Video	The Minutes	"IMTOD"	Simon Eustace
2011	Best Styled Video	I Draw Slow	"Goldmine"	Rory Bresnihan
2011	Sexiest Video	Echogram	"Conspiracy"	Shaun O’Connor
2011	Best Production Effects	Funeral Suits	"Florida"	Jonathan Irwin
2011	Best Director	–	–	Vincent Gallagher
2011	Viewers' Choice	King Kong Company	"Acetate"	John Loftus
2011	Video of the Year	Lisa Hannigan	"Little Bird"	Myles O'Reilly (musician)
