= Live Well, Change Often =

Studio album by The Minutes
- Released: May 9, 2014
- Recorded: Fader Sound Studios, Vancouver, British Columbia, Canada
- Genre: Garage, Rock, Blues
- Length: 38.10
- Label: Model Citizen
- Producer: Garth "GGGarth" Richardson

The Minutes chronology
Marcata (2011)	Live Well, Change Often (2014)

Singles from Live Well, Change Often
- 1. "Cherry Bomb" Released: April 2014; 2. "Hold Your Hand" Released: July 2014

Live Well, Change Often is the second album by Irish rock band The Minutes. It was released on 9 May 2014, through Model Citizen Records. The band claim that the album deals with "the reality of being in a rock 'n' roll band in the 21st Century, the hopes and the dreams, tempered with the shadows and illusions."

In its first week of release, the album peaked at number 12 in the official Irish Albums Chart.

== Track listing ==
All songs written by The Minutes.

No.	Title	Length
1.	"Hold Your Hand"	3.28
2.	"7 Seas"	3:19
3.	"Cherry Bomb"	3.20
4.	"Hey Hey"	3.34
5.	"Supernatural"	5.30
6.	"Outlaws"	4.40
7.	"Holy Roman Empire"	3.32
8.	"Lo and Behold"	4.07
9.	"1,2,3,4"	2.50
10.	"Mystery of Om"	5.10
Total length:		38.10

== Singles ==
Year	Title
2014	"Cherry Bomb"
2014	"Hold Your Hand"

== Personnel ==
- Mark Austin – Lead vocals, rhythm guitar
- Tom Cosgrave – Bass, backing vocals
- Shane Kinsella – Drums, backing vocals
