= Funeral Suits =

Former Irish rock group

Funeral Suits were an Irish alternative rock band from Dublin.

== History ==
Funeral Suits began in 2007. All of the band members lived in the same area in Dublin, and were introduced to each other either online or through mutual friends. They released numerous EPs before releasing their debut full-length album in 2012 titled Lily of the Valley. Four years later, Funeral Suits released their second and final full-length album titled Islands Apart. In April 2011, Funeral Suits were featured as The Guardian's "New Band of the Week".

== Band members ==
- Brian James – vocal, guitar, synth (2008–2016)
- Mik McKeogh – guitar, bass, synth (2007–2016)
- Greg McCarthy – drums (2008–2016)
- Darragh Grant – bass, synth, guitar (2011–2016)

== Discography ==
Albums

- Lily of the Valley (2012)
- Islands Apart (2016)
