= Ireland Music Week =

Irish emerging bands music festival

- Dates: 1 – 5 October
- Locations: Dublin, Ireland
- Years active: 2003–2018 (as HWCH); 2019–present (as Ireland Music Week)
- Website: irelandmusicweek.com

Ireland Music Week, previously known as Hard Working Class Heroes (or HWCH), is an Irish music festival for emerging bands. It has taken place in Dublin on an annual basis in and around September of each year since 2003. The Irish Times has referred to the event as "an essential must-see/do on Ireland's music calendar".

Organised by First Music Contact and Wrong Tape Speed, Hard Working Class Heroes has taken place since 2003. On 25 April 2019, it was announced that Hard Working Class Heroes would re-brand as Ireland Music Week.
