= Rubyworks Records =

Irish independent record label

- Founded: 2001
- Founder: Niall Muckian
- Genre: Various
- Country of origin: Ireland
- Official website: rubyworks.com

Rubyworks Records is an independent record label and music management company created in 2001 by Niall Muckian and based in Dublin, Ireland.

Rubyworks owns two subsidiary labels, Gotta Run Records and Model Citizen Records. The second subsidiary label Model Citizen Records creates rearrangements of their artists songs to be used for PD (Public Domain) In May 2012 Rubyworks merged with UK independent record label Ark Recordings.

== History ==
=== Formation ===
Rubyworks was formed by Niall Muckian in Dublin in 2001. Muckian was initially working with Damien Rice, helping him with the formation of his solo career when he saw Rodrigo y Gabriela supporting him at Vicar Street in Dublin. He decided he wanted to work with them. Rubyworks released re-Foc in September 2002, and continues to manage Rodrigo y Gabrela to this day.

Over the course of the last fourteen years, Rubyworks has released albums with Irish artists like Hothouse Flowers, Sinéad O'Connor, Mary Coughlan and Moving Hearts. In more recent times the label, which also includes offshoot imprints Model Citizen, Ark Recordings and Gotta Run, has developed a new generation of Irish talent including Hozier, in partnership with Columbia Records in North America and Australia and Island / Universal for the rest of the world, Ryan Sheridan (in partnership by Universal Music Germany), O.R.B. (The Original Rudeboys), The Minutes and Funeral Suits.

=== 2004–2006 ===
Rubyworks took its next step by releasing a new Hothouse Flowers album (Into Your Heart) in early 2004. Developing an international presence, the label helped established Irish acts like Aslan and Jerry Fish & The Mudbug Club release their music outside Ireland. The next major break through came later in 2004, when the second Rodrigo y Gabriela album, Live: Manchester and Dublin, became the first wholly instrumental album to debut in the Irish album chart Top 10. Rodrigo y Gabriela's and Rubyworks' local and international profile started to increase from this juncture.

In 2005, Roger Quail joined Rubyworks from the UK, having previously had long spells at 3mv (Oasis, Suede, Ministry of Sound) and Sony's SINE independent label development wing with a view to developing Rubyworks' international profile. The label enjoyed further critical success with Dublin rock group The Devlins. In early 2006 the label enjoyed its greatest success to date with the third Rodrigo y Gabriela album, which charted at # 1 in the Irish album charts in February 2006. The label also released new albums from Leya and Koufax in the same year

=== 2007–2008 ===
In 2007 and 2008, Rubyworks released: a new album from Sinéad O'Connor in June; a live CD/DVD package from the re-formed Moving Hearts; the debut album from County Down singer/songwriter Foy Vance; and an album from Mary Coughlan. Due to international licensing deals in North America, Australia, Europe, Japan and South Africa, global sales of the Rodrigo y Gabriela rose to over 500,000.

=== 2009–2012 ===
In May 2012 Rubyworks merged with UK independent record label Ark Recordings. In August 2012 Rubyworks celebrated its first decade in existence with three Dublin concerts featuring performances from bands like Rodrigo y Gabriela and Fight Like Apes.

Dublin band Funeral Suits released their debut album, Lily of the Valley, in June 2012. One of the songs released from the album, "All Those Friendly People", has since collected over 17 million views on YouTube. Junior label manager Eoin Aherne joined the label during this period.

=== 2013 to present ===
In 2013, with the aid of Denis Desmond & Caroline Downey, Rubyworks introduced Hozier to a more mainstream audience. He released his debut music video track, "Take Me To Church", in September 2013, when it peaked at number 2 on the Irish Singles Chart. The music video, recorded by Brendan Canty & Conal Thomson of Feel Good Lost, has collected over 530 million views on YouTube across two versions. Hozier then went on to release his debut EP, Take Me To Church, which included the track of the same name and "Angel of Small Death & the Codeine Scene".

American Musician John Murry released his album, The Graceless Age, with Rubyworks.

In 2014, Rubyworks released albums from: The Minutes (Live Well, Change Often), O.R.B. (All We Are) and Rodrigo y Gabriela (9 Dead Alive), and also Hozier's eponymous debut album, which was released in Ireland in September 2014 and globally in October 2014. Prior to this, Hozier released his second EP, From Eden, which included the single "From Eden". On 5 December 2014, it was announced that "Take Me to Church" was nominated at the 57th Annual Grammy Awards for Song of the Year in 2015, losing this award to Sam Smith.

2015 saw the release of Ryan Sheridan's follow-up album, Here and Now, on 28 August 2015 in Ireland, and topped the Irish Album Charts on 4 September 2015. The album was released in Germany on 11 September 2015 in conjunction with Universal Music Group, Germany. This year also saw the signing of two new bands to the label, Wyvern Lingo and Otherkin.

== Artists ==
=== Current ===
- Hozier
- Ryan Sheridan
- Josephine
- Vladimir
- Rodrigo y Gabriela
- Hudson Taylor
- Funeral Suits
- O.R.B.
- The Minutes
- Wyvern Lingo
- Otherkin
- Lyra
- David Keenan
- Kabin Crew

=== Alumni ===
- Leya
- The Devlins
- Mary Coughlan
- Sinéad O'Connor
- Foy Vance
- Wallis Bird
- Fight Like Apes
- Moving Hearts
- Tychonaut (formally "The Tycho Brahe")
- Gavin Friday
- Nigel Mooney
- Alberta Cross
- Little Roy
- John Murry
- Koufax
- Hothouse Flowers
- Deap Vally
