= Forfey Festival =

Annual music festival in Northern Ireland

- Genre: Folk, rock, pop
- Dates: Vary
- Locations: Forfey Farm; Lisnaskea; County Fermanagh; Northern Ireland
- Years active: 2006–2014
- Founders: Matt Minford
- Website: forfeyfestival.co.uk

Forfey Festival was an annual music festival held on Forfey Farm near Lisnaskea, County Fermanagh, Northern Ireland. The festival was last held in 2014. Each year's memorabilia (posters, flyers, social media and merchandise) featured a different animal as its theme, predominantly drawn by Neil Gillespie. 2014 was subtitled "Anno Rex", in memory of the farm's sole permanent resident, Rex.

== History ==
Forfey Festival was founded in 2006 by Matt Minford, bassist and vocalist of SixStarHotel. His family (still) own Forfey Farm, and for a number of years it had lain largely unused. For the first two years of the festival's existence, Minford was unable to obtain an entertainments licence for the farm, and so musical performances were held at other locations in Fermanagh, while the farm hosted arts exhibitions and camping. From 2008, the whole festival was held on Forfey Farm.

== Location ==
Forfey was held on a small family farm. While the festival was in progress, one field hosted camping and one field, car parking. Music venues included three sheds (known as the Hayshed, Lie-To, and The Pit) and a cottage attic (known as "The 1951"). Various outbuildings hosted mixed-media visual art exhibitions and film screenings.

== Lineups ==
Forfey Festival featured artists/bands
Year	Dates	Location	Artists / Bands		
2006	24–26 August	Enniskillen	Foy Vance; Sixstarhotel	Mojo Fury	We Are Knives; Heeltap
2007	2–5 August	Enniskillen			
2008	8–10 August	Forfey Farm	And So I Watch You From Afar; The Benjamins; Andrew Briggs; Checquerboard; Elliott from the West; Kowalski	Kyron and the Strangels; LaFaro; Lowly Knights; Lee Mitchell; Panama Kings; The Rumplestiltskins	SixStarHotel; Strait Laces; Sully; Micah Vincent
2009	7–9 August	Forfey Farm	Adebesi Shank; And So I Watch You From Afar; Bad Operator (DJ); Cardigan Drive; The Continuous Battle of Order; Filaria; The Good Fight (acoustic); Grand Pocket Orchestra	Kinnego Flux; Kowalski (DJ); Lowly Knights; Maguire and I; David McNair; Mojo Fury; Napoleon; Not Squares	Panama Kings; Push Borders (acoustic); SixStarHotel; Sully (DJ); Mel Wiggins; Jamie Woon
2010	6–8 August	Forfey Farm	Adebesi Shank; Axis Of; Iain Archer; Bad Operator; Captain Cameron; Clown Parlour; Gareth Dunlop; Feet for Wings	Laura Hunter; Katie and the Carnival; LaFaro; Lowly Knights; Maguire & I; More than Conquerors; Napoleon; Not Squares	Rams' Pocket Radio; Silhouette; SixStarHotel; Skibunny; Strait Laces; Sully; Tea Party; Urban Tramper
2011	5–7 August	Forfey Farm	Amidships; Before Machines; Captain Kennedy; Duke Special; Event Horses; Farriers	Feldberg; Kasper Rosa; Kowalski; Master and Dog; Mojo Fury; More than Conquerors	Daithi O'Dronai; A Plastic Rose; Phoenix Fire; Rams' Pocket Radio; Silhouette; The Wonder Villains
2012	3-5 August	Forfey Farm	Axis Of; Bad Operator; Before Machines; David C. Clements; Clown Parlour; Colly Strings; Farriers; Feet for Wings; Fred	Go Wolf; Havana House Party; In Case of Fire; The Jepettos; Katie and the Carnival; The Lowly Knights; Master & Dog; More Than Conquerors; Morning Claws	Not Squares; Katharine Philippa; Runaway Go; Sons of Caliber; Strait Laces; Sullivan and Gold; Window Seats; Wonder Villains
2013	9-11 August	Forfey Farm	Alana Henderson; Amidships; Arborist; Axis Of; BeeMickSee; Beulah Kim; Craig McConkey; Daithi O'Dronai; Ed Zealous; Enemies	Feet For Wings; Go Wolf; Hannah McPhillimy; Hologram; Jamie Neish; Joshua Burnside; Kasper Rosa; Katharine Philippa; Katie & The Carnival; Little Rivers	Mojo Fury; Patrick Gardiner; PigsAsPeople; Seven Summits; Skeletons; Sons of Burlap; Sons of Caliber; The 1930s; The Emerald Armada; The King Said
2014	1-3 August	Forfey Farm			
