= All for Nothing =

All for Nothing may refer to:

== Music ==
- All for Nothing (band), a Dutch band
- All for Nothing / Nothing for All, a 1997 two-disc compilation album by the Replacements

=== Songs ===
- "All for Nothing" (song), by Linkin Park, 2014
- "All for Nothing", by Against from Loyalty and Betrayal, 2007
- "All for Nothing", by Brand New Unit, 1995
- "All for Nothing", by Fighting with Wire from Man vs Monster, 2008
- "All for Nothing", by Late Night Alumni from Empty Streets, 2005
- "All for Nothing", by Matt Cardle from Letters, 2011
- "All for Nothing", from the soundtrack of the video game God of War III, 2010
- "All for Nothing", by Meredith Brooks from Deconstruction, 1999

== Other uses ==
- All for Nothing?, a Canadian real estate and design television series
- "All for Nothing" (Arrow), a 2018 episode of Arrow
- All for Nothing, a 1928 film directed by James Parrott
- "All for Nothing", a 1964 short story by David R. Bunch
- All for Nothing, a 2006 novel by postwar German author Walter Kempowski
