= Rock music in Ireland =

Irish appreciation of and contributions to the rock music genre

- Other names: Irish rock
- Stylistic origins: Rock music Rock and roll music
- Cultural origins: In the 1960s and the 1970s in Ireland

Rock music in Ireland, also known as Irish rock, has been a part of the music of Ireland since the 1960s, when the British Invasion brought British blues, psychedelic rock and other styles to the island. The Irish music scene in the 1960s and much of the 1970s was dominated by the unique Irish phenomenon of the 'Showbands' which were groups of professional performers who played at dancehalls and clubs across the country. They were putting on a professional 'show' and playing all the American and British hits of the era. From the mid-1970s onwards rock music in Ireland has followed a similar path to rock music in Britain.

== 1960s ==
In the 1960s being part of a 'Showband' was essentially the only way a professional musician in Ireland could make a living. Van Morrison, Henry McCullough and Rory Gallagher started working in Irish showbands, but went on to put Ireland on the rock music map. Van Morrison, growing up on Hyndford Street, was inspired by fellow resident George Cassidy, a jazz musician. Cassidy taught Morrison how to play tenor saxophone and music notation lessons, which made them bond and become friends. Van Morrison achieved international success in the 1960s with the beat group Them before launching a very successful solo career. Rory Gallagher formed the blues rock trio Taste and went on to achieve critical acclaim in his solo career which lasted until his death in 1995. He is considered by many music critics to be among the greatest rock guitarists of all time. The Strangers from Balbriggan were also very popular and had a unique sound. Their record "Strangers" made # 6 in the Irish charts.

Eire Apparent, a rock band from Belfast who formed in 1967 is noted for launching the careers of Henry McCullough and Ernie Graham, and for having Jimi Hendrix play on, and produce, their only album.

== 1970s ==
The early 1970s saw a growth of Irish rock music. One band that rose to international prominence was the hard rocking Thin Lizzy, led by Phil Lynott. Another Irish band, Horslips, broke new ground by mixing hard rock with traditional Irish music to create a new genre – Celtic rock. They challenged the idea that an Irish band had to leave the country to be successful. They stayed in Ireland instead of moving abroad to chase success. They were successful in Ireland but never achieved much international success. The early 1970s paved the way for another band that would remain based in Ireland but would go on to dominate the music world – U2. U2 began their musical career in 1976 and went on to become internationally known. Irish success in this period on a more commercial basis was led by Waterford born pop singer/songwriter Gilbert O'Sullivan, whose achievements included two UK No. 1 singles ("Clair" and "Get Down") and one United States No. 1 ("Alone Again (Naturally)")

In the mid-70s, with a roots revival of traditional music burgeoning, folk rock fusion groups such as Planxty and Moving Hearts as well as singer-songwriters like Christy Moore and Paul Brady rose to prominence.

The late 1970s saw the height of the punk rock movement. Irish bands such as Northern Ireland's Stiff Little Fingers and The Undertones as well as Dublin's The Radiators from Space, The Boomtown Rats, Berlin, The Blades, The Vipers and the avant-garde The Virgin Prunes were in the midst of the new genre.

== 1980s ==
The 1980s saw the rise to stardom of the most successful Irish rock band, U2. Since the release of their album Boy in 1980, U2 has grown to become one of the biggest rock bands in the world. In fact, Rolling Stone claims this band to be "the biggest band in the world." Band members Bono (Paul Hewson), The Edge (David Evans), Adam Clayton, and Larry Mullen Jr have brought international attention to this unique genre. Within four years of starting the band, they were signed onto Island Records. Their 1987 album, Joshua Tree sent them over the top. Now, in the third decade of their career, they continue to achieve enormous commercial and critical success. Throughout their career U2 have kept their base firmly planted in their home town, Dublin. The band, especially frontman Bono, are also well known for their social conscience and their involvement in various international causes. Along with the 1980s came County Donegal group Clannad who were, at the time, innovators in bridging the gap between pop rock music and traditional Irish music.

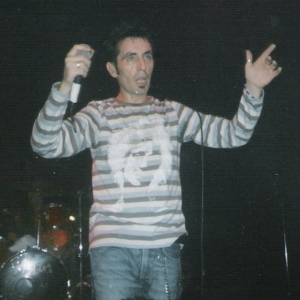
Aslan lead singer Christy Dignam.

Following the disbandment of The Undertones in 1983, lead vocalist Feargal Sharkey pursued a solo career while the other band members formed That Petrol Emotion along with an American vocalist, Steve Mack.

In 1986 The Saw Doctors from Tuam in County Galway formed however the band would have to wait until the nineties and noughties for major success. Likewise, The Stunning were formed in Gaillimh in 1987 but enjoyed early chart topping success from 1988 until their break-up in 1994. Orchestral pop band The Divine Comedy from Enniskillen also formed in the eighties.

In the 1980s The Pogues became very successful with their radical new take on the fusion of traditional Irish music with punk rock attitude. This style of 'punked-up traditional Irish music' has also taken off outside Ireland and the UK, especially in the United States. Other Irish artists to gain fame in the 1980s were Sinéad O'Connor and the heavy metal group Mama's Boys. Former Thin Lizzy guitarist Gary Moore achieved success in his 1980s solo career but returned to his blues rock roots in the 1990s. The 1980s witnessed a lot of interest from foreign shores Cactus World News were one of the bands which managed to garner success outside Ireland (United States, UK Germany) without become hugely successful they charted continually internationally.

The 1980s also saw the birth of rock band Aslan from Finglas and Ballymun in North Dublin, the third biggest selling Irish act in Ireland.

In 1981 the Slane Concert at Slane Castle in County Meath began which is still held most years.

== 1990s ==
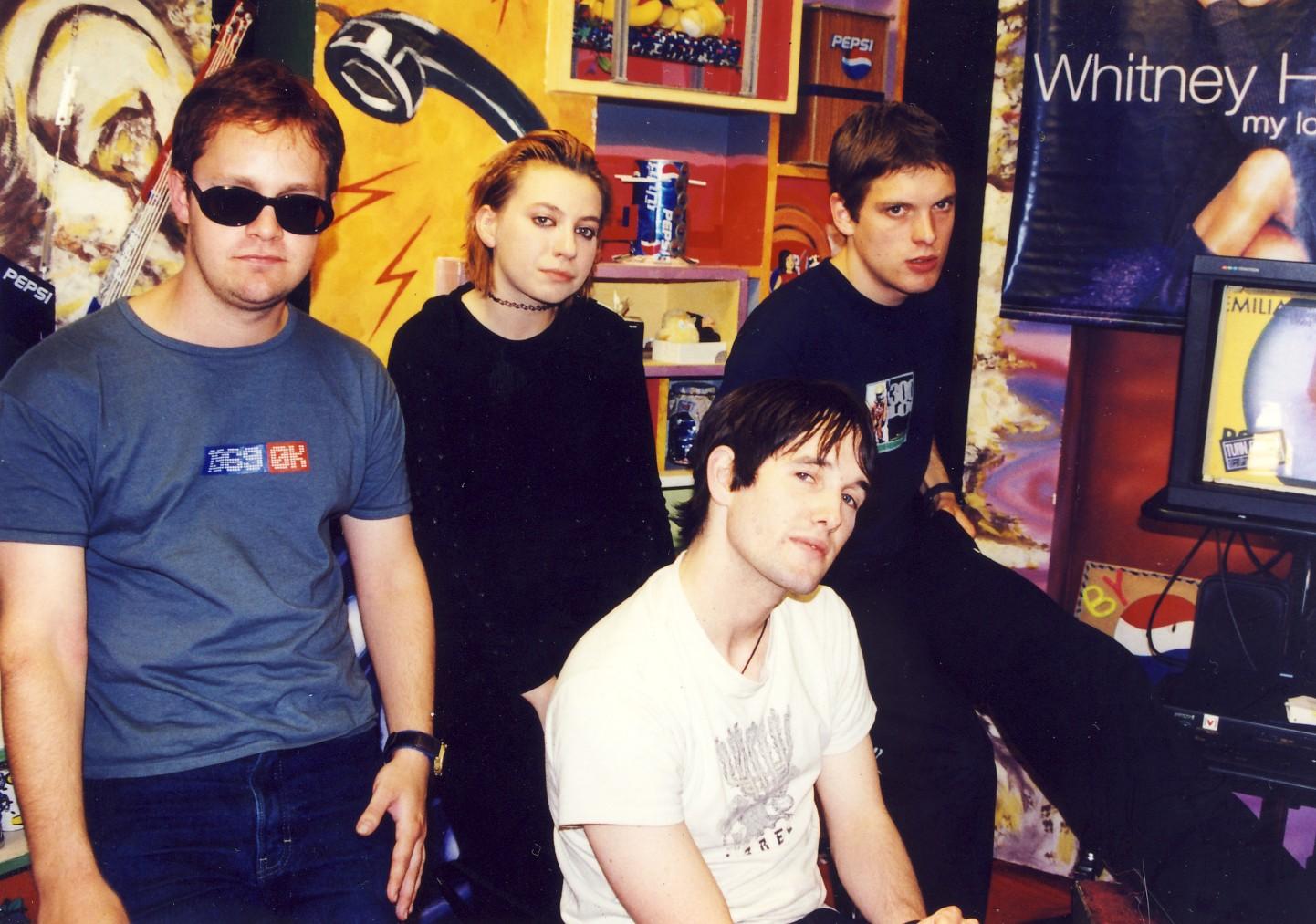
Rock Group 'Ash' from County Down in 1999.

In the late 1980s and early 1990s, Dublin based group My Bloody Valentine pioneered a new style of rock, Shoegazing, and received much critical acclaim. A new crop of Irish rockers claimed success in the 1990s including The Cranberries from Limerick, The Golden Horde, Indie rock bands Blink, The Frames and the critically acclaimed but commercially unsuccessful Whipping Boy and The Revenants – all from Dublin, Alternative metal band from County Antrim 'Therapy?', folk rock group The Corrs of Dundalk and Alternative rock band Ash from Downpatrick, County Down.

From 1990 to 1997 the Féile Festival was an annual rock music festival held in Semple Stadium in Thurles, Páirc Uí Chaoimh in Cork, and the Point Theatre in Dublin.

At the very end of the decade The Undertones, a popular band in the 1970s and 1980s, reformed without vocalist Feargal Sharkey.

== 2000s ==
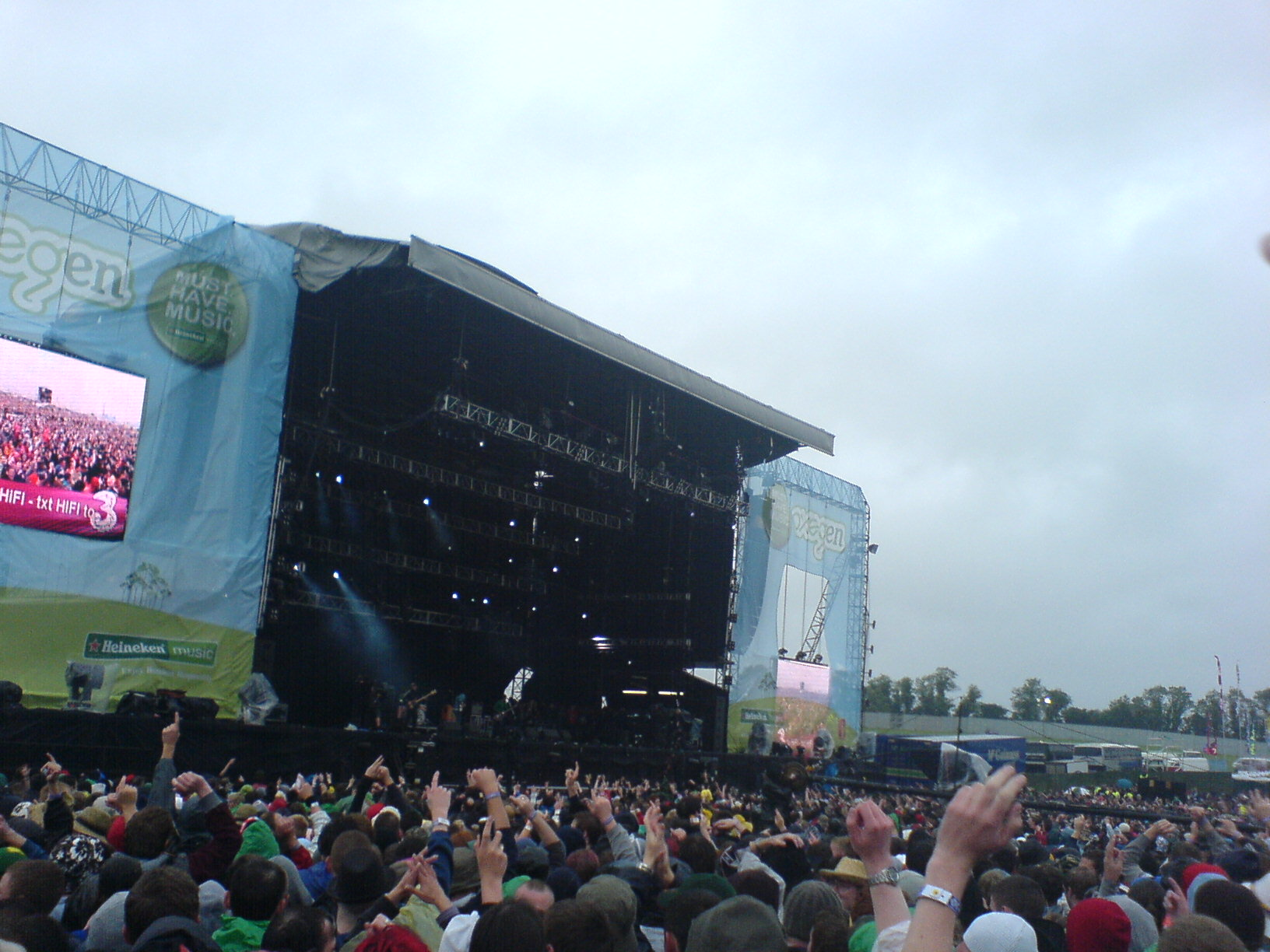
The Main Stage at Oxegen 2006 held at Punchestown Racecourse in County Kildare.

The 2000s have continued the theme in Ireland, revealing such great musical artists as singer/songwriter Damien Rice who has achieved international critical acclaim. Groups such as Snow Patrol, Nine Lies, The Thrills and The Script have also had significant international success. This decade has also produced a number of acclaimed solo singer/songwriters such as Paddy Casey, Duke Special, Damien Dempsey, Bressie, Declan O'Rourke, Chris Singleton, Cathy Davey, Gemma Hayes, David Kitt, Mundy, Jinx Lennon and Simple Kid.

Other bands from Ireland that formed in the 2000s include Nine Lies, The Coronas, The Blizzards, Royseven, Two Door Cinema Club, Director, Delorentos, Hamsandwich, The Answer, Codes, The Chakras, Fred, Hybrasil, Heathers and Adebisi Shank.

There are many rock concerts and festivals annually in Ireland which began in the 2000s, and continue to run today. Most notably Oxegen, Electric Picnic, Indiependence and Belsonic.

== 2010s ==
In the late 2000s and 2010s many unsigned bands emerged from both north and south of the border, such as, Hozier, Fontaines D.C., Axis Of, Jody Has A Hitlist, Girl Band, LaFaro, Fighting with Wire.
