= More Than Conquerors (band) =

Alternative rock band

- Origin: Belfast, Northern Ireland
- Genre: Alternative rock
- Years active: 2009–2019
- Label: Smalltown America
- Past members: Kris Platt; Danny Ball; Danny Morton; Jamie Neish

More Than Conquerors were an alternative rock band from Belfast, Northern Ireland.

== History ==
Formed in 2009, Kris Platt united with Danny Ball on guitar, Danny Morton on bass, and Jamie Neish on drums to form the band "More Than Conquerors". Signing to Northern Irish independent record label Smalltown America (And So I Watch You From Afar, LaFaro, Jetplane Landing) in early 2010, the band released their debut EP More Than Conquerors. Gaining recognition within the BBC Introducing platform and on BBC Radio Ulster’s "Across The Line" radio show lead to a main-stage appearance at Northern Irish festival Glasgowbury in the summer of 2011.

More Than Conquerors' latest EP Boots & Bones was released by Smalltown America Records on 7 November 2011.

== Discography ==
=== Studio albums ===
- Everything I've Learnt (Smalltown America 2013)
- They'll Make Art From The Things That I've Seen (Oiltape Records 2015)

=== EPs ===
- More Than Conquerors EP (Smalltown America 2010)
- Boots & Bones (Smalltown America 2011)

=== Singles ===
- A Lion, A Man (Smalltown America 2011)
- "When The Well Runs Dry" (Smalltown America 2013)
- "Pits Of Old" (Smalltown America 2013)
- "NETYME" (Oiltape Records 2019)

=== Various artist compilations ===
- Oh Yeah Contenders 2010 (Oh Yeah Music Centre, Belfast)

== Videography ==
- "Go On, Go On Get Out" (from More Than Conquerors EP)
- "A Lion, A Man" (from Boots & Bones EP)
- "Bear Knuckle Fight" (from "Boots & Bones" EP)
- "Oh My Son" (from "Boots & Bones" EP)
- "When The Well Runs Dry" (from "Everything I've Learnt")
- "Pits of Old" (from Everything I've Learnt)

== Former members ==
- Kris Platt - Lead vocals, rhythm guitar
- Danny Ball - Lead guitar
- Danny Morton - Bass
- Jamie Neish - Drums
