= Glasgowbury Music Festival =

Glasgowbury
- Genre: Rock
- Dates: Vary
- Locations: Draperstown; County Londonderry; Northern Ireland
- Years active: 2000–2013
- Founders: Paddy Glasgow
- Website: www.glasgowbury.com

The Glasgowbury Music Festival was an annual music festival held in Draperstown, County Londonderry, Northern Ireland running from 2000 - 2013.

== History ==
The Glasgowbury Music Festival made its first appearance in the summer of 2000 as a gathering of local bands, acts and showcases to raise awareness for the local charity, the Ulster Cancer Foundation. The event was co-ordinated by singer/songwriter Paddy Glasgow and the event is named after him. The name is a play on Glastonbury Festival. Since its foundation in 2000, the festival has grown in popularity, and with each year, the event draws a significantly larger crowd than the previous year. By 2008, the festival had expanded to four separate stages with several areas allocated to traders, small businesses, and entertainment. In recent years the event has enjoyed media coverage, with BBC Radio Foyle and RTÉ 2FM having broadcast live throughout the day. Music journalists from various magazines such as Alternative Ulster and Hot Press have also been in attendance. Fans are invited to camp at the festival, with ground set aside to accommodate those who wish to do so.

Glasgowbury has since become a registered charity and made the move to the Cornstore in 2014, with the aim of providing entertainment and accessible tuition to the rural community at an affordable and accessible price. Since the move to the cornstore, Glasgowbury has gone on to become a registered OCN teaching centre and still hold many gigs such as the Sunday Unplugged and even continuing the ever popular G-Sessions.

== Lineups ==
Glasgowbury Music Festival featured artists/bands
Year	Location	Artists / Bands		
2003	High Ridge, Drumard	Corrigan; Dirty Stevie; Element; Indigo Fury; Leon	Little Hooks; Onya; Paul Casey; Savasana; Screaming Gypsies	Triggerman; Troy Campbell; The Undertones; Urban Circus
2004	Draperstown Playing Fields	Alphastates; Ann Scott; The Answer; Ben Reel Band; DeXtra; Elation; The Evangelists; Fast Emperors	Fisto; Fighting with Wire; Fractured; The Humbleweeds; Innuendo; Invinyl; John D'Arcy; Kyle	Lovechild; Mojo Fury; Nice'n'Sleezy; Mantic; Onya; Paul Casey; The Rags; über
2005	Cellar Bar, Draperstown	Angelfall; Dutch Schultz; The Delawares; Ego; Fighting with Wire; FISTO; The Flaws	The Gags Beasley; John D'Arcy; Leya; Little Hooks; Mojo Fury; Paul Casey; The Rags	Swanee River; Trip Fontane; The Velvet Scooters; Vesta Varro; The Zoo
2006	Eagle's Rock	Spurs of Rock Stage		
2006	Eagle's Rock	Bronagh Gallagher; Dutch Schultz; Ego; Neil Fallon; Ignition	The Immediate; In Case of Fire; J.A.W.; Jaded Sun; Mojo Fury	The Rags; Red Organ Serpent Sound; Red Sirus; Ann Scott
2006	Eagle's Rock	Eagle's Rock Acoustic Stage		
2006	Eagle's Rock	Angelfall; Chadsko; Civilian; The Delawares; Grainne & Liam; The Henry Girls	Iain Archer; Little Hooks; Mantic; Nina Armstrong; Oonagh Clarke; Paddy Nash	Paul Casey; Pictures of Buddy; The Tides; Tracey & Dee
2007	Eagle's Rock	Spurs of Rock Stage		
2007	Eagle's Rock	Mantic; Susan Bluechild; Furlo; CODA; Farago	Freerider; King Coma; Superjimenez; Swanee River; Skruff	And So I Watch You from Afar; Black Tokens; Henry McCullough; The Delawares; Desert Hearts
2007	Eagle's Rock	Eagle's Rock Acoustic Stage		
2007	Eagle's Rock	Junior Johnson; Ard Ri; Barefoot; John D'Arcy	Oonagh Clarke; Scary Biscuits; Joe Echo; Paddy Nash	Cat Malojian; Paul Casey; Robyn G Shiels
2007	Eagle's Rock	Small but Massive Main Stage		
2007	Eagle's Rock	Duke Special; Oppenheimer; In Case of Fire; Mojo Fury; The Beat Poets	Triggerman; Inishowen Gospel Choir; The Q; Delorentos; The Jane Bradfords	Superfreakz; Fighting with Wire; General Fiasco; Nice'n'Sleezy
2008	Eagle's Rock	G Sessions Stage		
2008	Eagle's Rock	Black Horse; Cashier No. 9; Colenso Parade; Cutaways	The Dagger Lee's; Deep Fried Funk DJ's; The Delawares; Grainne Duffy	Hybrasil; Pat McManus; SuperFreakz
2008	Eagle's Rock	Spurs of Rock Stage		
2008	Eagle's Rock	The Beat Poets; Dutch Schultz; Ed Zealous; Freerider	Here Comes The Landed Gentry; Interrogate; LaFaro; Lotion	Mojo Fury; Swanee River; Sword Chant; Triggerman
2008	Eagle's Rock	Eagle's Rock Acoustic Stage		
2008	Eagle's Rock	Ard Ri; Roisin Atcheson; Rachel Austin; Boathouse; Paul Casey	Cat Malojian; Oonagh Clarke; Dolbro Dan; Joe Echo; Ben Glover	John Gribbin; Keith Harkin; Junior Johnson; Self Healer
2008	Eagle's Rock	Small but Massive Main Stage		
2008	Eagle's Rock	And So I Watch You from Afar; Ash; Fighting with Wire; Furlo	General Fiasco; Ham Sandwich; Inishowen Gospel Choir; Mantic	The Q; Panama Kings; Skruff; 9Lies
2009	Eagle's Rock	G Sessions Stage		
2009	Eagle's Rock	The Beat Poets; Colenso Parade; Cutaways; Deep Fried Funk DJ's	Ed Zealous; Grainne O; Inishowen Gospel Choir; Kowalski	The Q; Pocket Promise; The Stetz
2009	Eagle's Rock	Spurs of Rock Stage		
2009	Eagle's Rock	Black Bear Saloon; Dirty Stevie; Dutch Schultz; Furlo	Henry McCullough; Here Comes The Landed Gentry; Interrogate; Jaded Sun	The Mighty Stef; A Plastic Rose; Pretty Child Backfire; Swanee River
2009	Eagle's Rock	Eagle's Rock Acoustic Stage		
2009	Eagle's Rock	Balkan Alien Sound; Building Pictures; Paul Casey; Clown Parlour	Joe Echo; Junior Johnson; Keith Harkin; Little Hooks	Paddy Nash + The Happy Enchiladas; Silhouette; Ten Gallon Hat + The Big Salute
2009	Eagle's Rock	Small but Massive Main Stage		
2009	Eagle's Rock	And So I Watch You from Afar; Cashier No. 9; General Fiasco; The Good Fight	In Case of Fire; The Jane Bradfords; The Kinetiks; LaFaro	Mojo Fury; Skruff; We Are Resistance; Yes Cadets
2010	Eagle's Rock	G Spot Stage		
2010	Eagle's Rock	Building Pictures; Bronagh Gallagher	Paul Casey; Chipzel	Little Hooks; Junior Johnson; Paul Shevlin
2010	Eagle's Rock	G Sessions Stage		
2010	Eagle's Rock	Futurechaser; Key of Atlas; Gascan Ruckus; Colenso Parade	The Q; And So I Watch You From Afar; Furlo; Panama Kings	Not Squares; A Plastic Rose; In Case Of Fire; General Fiasco
2010	Eagle's Rock	Spurs of Rock Stage		
2010	Eagle's Rock	Adebisi Shank; Deep Fried Funk DJs; Fingersmith; Here Come The Landed Gentry	The Last Tycoons; Pocket Billiards; The Riptide Movement; The Rupture Dogs	Stand Up Guy; Swanee River; Team Fresh; Triggerman
2010	Eagle's Rock	Eagle's Rock Stage		
2010	Eagle's Rock	Captain Kennedy; Jackson Cage; Henrietta Game; Silhouette	Paddy Nash + The Happy Enchiladas; John Edgar Voe; The Vals; John, Shelly & The Creatures	Keith Harkin; Lowly Knights; Joe Echo; Duke Special
2010	Eagle's Rock	Small but Massive Main Stage		
2010	Eagle's Rock	Axis Of; Wonder Villains; More Than Conquerors; The Jane Bradfords	Strait Laces; Rams' Pocket Radio; Mojo Fury; Yes Cadets	Cashier No. 9; Fight Like Apes; LaFaro; Fighting with Wire
2011	Eagle's Rock	G Spot Stage		
2011	Eagle's Rock	Allie Bradley; Jason Clarke	John D'Arcy; Dolbro Dan	Paddy Nash; G Spot Comedy Club
2011	Eagle's Rock	G Sessions Stage		
2011	Eagle's Rock	Colly Strings; Wonder Villains; Intermission; Gascan Ruckus	Team Fresh; Sweet Jane; Furlo; Fred	Swanee River; LaFaro; The Answer
2011	Eagle's Rock	Spurs of Rock Stage		
2011	Eagle's Rock	Dead Til Friday; Kasper Rosa; Preacher's Son; The Rupture Dogs	We Are Knuckle Dragger; Darkest Era; The Bonnevilles; Le Galaxie	Pocket Billiards; Boxcutter; Deep Fried Funk DJs; Phil Kieran
2011	Eagle's Rock	Eagle's Rock Acoustic Stage		
2011	Eagle's Rock	Rachel Austin; Phoenix Fire; Elspeth; The 1930s	Aaron Shanley; Rainy Boy Sleep; Pat Dam Smyth; Paul Shevlin	Katie + The Carnival; Paul Casey; Foy Vance
2011	Eagle's Rock	Small but Massive Main Stage		
2011	Eagle's Rock	Event Horses; Seven Summits; Silhouette; More Than Conquerors	Kowalski; Girls Names; A Plastic Rose; The Plea	Axis Of; Rams' Pocket Radio; Mojo Fury; Cashier No. 9
2012	Eagle's Rock	G Spot Comedy Stage		
2012	Eagle's Rock	Micky Bartlett; Danny Dowling; Colin Geddis; Ryan Hand	Ronan Linskey; Magic George; Niamh Marron; Philip McEwan	Rural Key Collective; Scorpion Jack; Soak; VerseChorusVerse
2012	Eagle's Rock	G Sessions Stage		
2012	Eagle's Rock	Amidships; The Dead Presidents; Empty Lungs; Enemies; Icon On Fire	Kowalski; LaFaro; Mojo Fury; Our Krypton Son	Psychatron; Rams' Pocket Radio; Runaway Go; Wonder Villains
2012	Eagle's Rock	Spurs of Rock Stage		
2012	Eagle's Rock	Boxcutter; Deep Fried Funk; Droids; Fox Jaw Bounty Hunters	HumanShield; The Red Velvetines; Space Dimension Controller	Swanee River; Triggerman; Ryan Vail
2012	Eagle's Rock	Eagle's Rock Acoustic Stage		
2012	Eagle's Rock	The 1930s; 4 Conors; Ard Ri; Best Boy Grip	John Deery; Farriers; The Jepettos; The Man Whom	Paddy Nash; Marc O'Reilly; Sons of Caliber; Tucan
2012	Eagle's Rock	Small but Massive Main Stage		
2012	Eagle's Rock	Axis Of; Fighting with Wire; Japanese Popstars; Katie and the Carnival	Master and Dog; Mojo Gogo; Pocket Billiards; Pretty Child Backfire	Silhouette; Therapy?; Tied to Machines

== Awards ==
Year	Awards Body / Institute	Nomination(s)	Award(s)
2008	Irish Festival Awards	Best Lineup; Best New Festival; Best Service; Best Toilets; Family Festival Award; Social Responsibility Award	Best Service; Family Festival Award
2009	Irish Festival Awards	Best Lineup; Best Service; Best Small Festival; Best Toilets; Family Festival Award; Social Responsibility Award	Best Lineup; Best Service; Best Small Festival; Family Festival Award
2009	Carnegie UK Trust		Rural Spark (Northern Ireland)
2010	UK Festival Awards	Best Small Festival; Grassroots Festival Award	Runner Up - Best Small Festival
2010	Irish Festival Awards	Best Lineup; Best Service; Best Small Festival; Best Toilets; Family Festival Award; Social Responsibility Award	Best Service; Family Festival Award
2011	Northern Ireland Music Awards	Best Festival	Best Festival
2011	UK Festival Awards	Best Small Festival	
2011	Irish Festival Awards	Best Lineup; Best Service; Best Small Festival; Best Toilets; Family Festival Award; Social Responsibility Award	
2012	Titanic GO Awards	Festival/Event of the Year	
