= Helsinki Seven =

English alternative rock band

- Origin: Northwich, Cheshire, England
- Genres: Rock; alternative rock; punk rock
- Years active: 2006–present
- Labels: Dapsone Records (UK); Yr Letter (France)
- Members: Joe Penny; Nick Cowling; Rudy Land
- Past members: Sat Nav Sam; Elliot Stimpson
- Website: helsinkiseven.tk

Helsinki Seven are an English alternative rock band from Northwich, Cheshire, England.

== History ==
Helsinki Seven are a three piece band who have toured with Fighting With Wire, Future of the Left, LaFaro, Atomic Garden and Palehorse.

The band have received national airplay on the XFM Rock Show and Clint Boon's Music: Response Show.

In February 2008, the band released the limited edition EP, The Trap Is Set, recorded and mastered by Neal Calderwood (Fighting With Wire, General Fiasco) at Manorpark Studios, Northern Ireland. The release was well received, garnering positive reviews from Sandman magazine, and Fungalpunk.

In early 2009, drummer Elliot Stimpson left the band and was later replaced by Nick Cowling. The band had to re-record their debut album Helsinki Seven in June 2009. The album was recorded, mixed and mastered by Joe Penny in two weeks and was released on 21 September 2009 on the independent record label, Dapsone Records.

The first single released from the album was "Waiting for a Hero" which received its first national airplay on the XFM Rock Show on 11 July 2009.

In October 2010, the band released their new EP Divisions and supported the release with a three-week tour of Europe and the UK. Divisions was self recorded and mastered by Mike Major (At the drive-in, Sparta). The record received glowing reviews in The Skinny (4/5) and RoomThirteen (11/13)

In September 2011, the band announced another European tour including slots at festivals in Belgium and France.

== Discography ==
=== Albums ===
- Helsinki Seven (21 September 2009)

=== EPs ===
- Introductions and Exits (2006) Tour Ep
- Calm After the Storm (2007) Tour Ep
- The Trap Is Set (2008)
- Divisions (2010)

=== Singles ===
- "Waiting for a Hero" (2009)
- "Divisions" (2011)
