= Atomic Garden =

Atomic Garden or atomic garden may refer to:

- Atomic gardening, a type of plant research
- Atomic Garden (band), an indie rock band from France
- Atomic Garden (song), a song by the band Bad Religion
- The Atomic Garden, a recording studio owned by Jack Shirley
