= More Than Conquerors =

More Than Conquerors may refer to:

- a reference to Romans 8:37 in the Bible
- More Than Conquerors (album), a 1999 album by Dogwood
- More Than Conquerors (novel), a 1959 novel by Edilberto K. Tiempo
- More Than Conquerors (band), an alternative rock band from Belfast, Northern Ireland
