= Colonel Blood (disambiguation) =

Colonel Blood may refer to:

- Colonel James Blood (1833–1885), former Commander of the 6th Missouri and the second husband of Victoria Woodhull
- Colonel James Clinton Blood (1819–1894), first mayor of Lawrence, Kansas
- Thomas Blood (1618–1680), Irish officer, self-styled colonel, and rogue in both England and Ireland. Noted for having tried to steal Britain's Crown Jewels.
- Colonel Blood (film), a 1934 film depicting the life of Thomas Blood, directed by W. P. Lipscomb
- Colonel Blood (album), a 2012 album by Fighting with Wire

== See also ==
- Captain Blood
