= Geppetto (disambiguation) =

Geppetto is the creator of Pinocchio in the 1883 novel The Adventures of Pinocchio, and subsequent adaptations.

Geppetto may also refer to:

== Characters ==
- Geppetto (Fables), a fictional character in the comic Fables
- Geppetto (Once Upon a Time) (also known as Marco), a fictional character in the ABC television series Once Upon a Time
- Gepetto, a playable character in Shadow Hearts: Covenant
- Dr. Geppetto Bosconovich, a character in the Tekken video games

== Films ==
- Geppetto (film), a 2000 television film on The Wonderful World of Disney starring Drew Carey in the title role and Julia Louis-Dreyfus as the Blue Fairy

== Songs ==
- "Gepetto", a song by the alternative rock band Belly from the 1993 album Star
- "Gepetto", a song by the Italian metal band Novembre from the 2006 album Materia

== See also ==
- Jepetto, an alternative rock band from Maryland, USA
- The Jepettos, an alternative folk band from Northern Ireland
