= Pocket billiards (disambiguation) =

Pocket billiards is another name for the cue sport of pool. It may also refer to:

- "Pocket Billiards (band)", a nine-piece ska/punk band from Belfast, Northern Ireland
- "Pocket Billiards", a song by British folk-rock group Stackridge from the 1974 album Extravaganza
