= SixStarHotel =

UK musical group

Sixstarhotel
- Origin: Lisburn, Northern Ireland
- Genres: Alternative rock
- Labels: We Collect Records
- Members: David Clements - Guitar/Vocals; Matt Minford - Bass/Vocals; Timothy Anderson - Guitar; Neil Gillespie - Drums
- Website: www.myspace.com/sixstarhotel

Sixstarhotel, is an alternative rock band from Belfast, Northern Ireland. After forming in 2001, the band released three self-financed EPs—Circus Music 2002, Everyone's a Critic 2004 and These Rosewood Theories 2005 —before moving on to full-length albums. Their debut album A Kind of Crusade was released in January 2007 and their second album Tides and Tides in December 2009.

== History ==
The band began with founding members David Clements and Neil Gillespie, who spent their early days writing and recording music together in the attic of Neil’s parents’ house. They were soon joined by Timothy Anderson—David’s classmate from Wallace High School — and bassist Matt Minford, a childhood friend. From the outset, the group focused on creating original material, recording DIY demos and performing live throughout their teenage years.

In 2003, while still in school, Sixstarhotel landed a spot on the main stage at Flevo Festival in the Netherlands after another act withdrew.

The band went on to tour extensively across Northern Ireland, building a loyal following and receiving positive local press for their EPs. In October 2004, they relocated to Glasgow, Scotland, committing to the band full-time and funding their rent and rehearsal space through DIY shows alongside Scottish acts such as Twin Atlantic and Jocasta Sleeps. Months of continuous touring across the UK followed, leading to recording sessions with acclaimed producers Richard Flack (Queens of the Stone Age, Foo Fighters) and Mark Aubrey (Bloc Party). They also completed a month-long tour of Denmark and shared stages in the UK with You Say Party! We Say Die!, The Young Knives, and And So I Watch You From Afar, culminating in a headlining show at Belfast’s Limelight December 2006.

In 2007, the band self-released their debut album, A Kind Of Crusade, under their label We Collect Records. Recorded and mixed in Belfast with Rocky O’Reilly of Oppenheimer and mastered at Abbey Road Studios, the album launch was followed by extensive touring. Their return to Denmark for another month-long run and a second appearance at the Flevo Festival coincided with growing UK attention, including student radio airplay from Edinburgh to Leeds.

Early 2008 saw another UK tour—this time co-headlining with Panama Kings—before activity slowed due to Matt and then David getting married, and Tim and Neil relocating to London later that year. Despite being split between cities, the band continued writing and tracking material for a second full-length album.

Sixstarhotel’s self-produced second album, Tides And Tides, was released digitally on 7 December 2009 and physically on 10 December. The first single, Kid Go Get It, was made available as a free download on 9 November, accompanied by a music video. The album marked a stylistic shift away from their earlier math-rock-influenced sound and featured a broad range of new material. It was mixed in Los Angeles by Brad Wood (mewithoutYou), who became a fan after hearing their recordings. To preview the album, the band played three pre-release shows in Belfast, Glasgow, and London from 4–6 December.

In February 2010, Sixstarhotel sold out Belfast’s Empire Music Hall, launching a UK tour in support of Tides And Tides.

== Other projects ==
Outside of Sixstarhotel, the band members have pursued a wide range of artistic projects. In late 2006 and early 2007, they founded their own record label, We Collect Records, which released the band’s own music as well as EPs by The Lowly Knights and David Clements’s solo work under the moniker Captain Cameron. All four members were actively involved in running the label.

David Clements currently performs as David C. Clements and has released two full-length albums met with critical acclaim - The Longest Day in History (2016) and The Garden (2024). In 2022, Clements temporarily took over vocal duties for Two Door Cinema Club, performing in place of frontman Alex Trimble at three concerts in Brazil.

In 2006, Matt Minford established the grassroots Forfey Festival on his family farm in Lisnaskea. The festival showcased leading Irish acts—and guests from abroad—from 2006 to 2014. Minford later founded the Belfast-based audio engineering company Forfey, which shares the festival’s name.

Alongside his work with Sixstarhotel, Neil Gillespie has performed with The Lowly Knights and David McNair (producer of the band’s These Rosewood Theories EP). He was also a founding member of Grand Forever and BearFoot. In 2010, Gillespie joined the London art-rock band Cymbals with Panama Kings’ Luke Carson, remaining with the group until after the release of their second album, Age of Fracture, in 2014. Gillespie obtained an endorsement deal with C&C Drums.

Tim Anderson has been involved in numerous side projects, including You Will Live Disco, Our Singapore Friends, and The Motion Union, though his most notable collaboration has been Grand Forever alongside Gillespie on drums. Anderson continues to release music under the name Forever with Luke Carson under the moniker Grand.

== Discography ==
EPs

- Circus Music (2002)
- Everyone's a Critic (2004)
- These Rosewood Theories (2005)

Albums

- A Kind of Crusade (2007)
- Tides And Tides (2009)

== Influences ==
The following have all been cited as strong influences in Sixstarhotel's music.

- Les Savy Fav
- Mewithoutyou
- At the Drive-In
- Mew
- Biffy Clyro
