= Window seat =

Window seat may refer to:

- Window seat (type of sofa), a miniature sofa without a back, intended to fill the recess of a window
- In vehicles, especially aircraft or train, a seat nearest the window – see airline seat or train seat

Other:

- Window Seat (film), 2022 Indian film
- "Window Seat" (song), a song by Erykah Badu
- Window Seat, a song on Curve (Our Lady Peace album)
- Window Seats, a Northern Ireland rock band
