= Megafauna (disambiguation) =

Megafauna refers to living or extinct large or giant animals.

Megafauna may also refer to:

- Megafauna (album), an album by And So I Watch You from Afar
- Megafauna (mythology), giant animals in mythological contexts
- Macrobenthos, naked-eye visible bottom-dwelling animals

== See also ==
- Megafaun, an American psychedelic folk band
