= Oppenheimer (album) =

Studio album by Oppenheimer
- Released: June 6, 2006
- Genre: Indie pop electronica
- Length: 35:00
- Label: Bar/None, Smalltown America

Oppenheimer chronology
Oppenheimer (2006)	Take the Whole Midrange and Boost It (2008)

Oppenheimer is the debut album by Belfast indie-pop duo Oppenheimer. It was released in the United States and Canada in June 2006 through Bar/None Records and in the UK in March 2007 through Smalltown America.

== Background and recording ==
Shaun Robinson and Rocky O'Reilly composed the songs from Oppenheimer between 2004 and 2006. They were signed to Bar/None Records in 2005, after sending an unsolicited demo to the label via email. Several tracks from the album, including "Breakfast in NYC" and "Allen Died April 5", were recorded in O'Reilly's home in Belfast. O'Reilly describes their gear setup at the time as comprising "two guitars, some cheap keyboards and a cheap microphone". Belfast DJ David Holmes loaned the band some additional recording equipment. The band was also joined by Tim Wheeler of the Northern Irish alternative group Ash. Wheeler, a childhood friend of Robinson, provided lead vocals on "Orchid".

== Reception ==
Professional ratings
Review scores
Source	Rating
AllMusic	3/5 stars
Drowned in Sound	8/10

Oppenheimer received generally positive reviews from critics. In a review for Drowned in Sound, Francis Jones called the album "pithy and precise", and observed that the "honeyed vocals and saccharine-slathered synth" belie the lyrical themes of heartache. However, Jones cited "Okay, Let's Take This Outside" and "Orchid" as low points for the album.

== Track listing ==
All songs written by Oppenheimer, except where noted.

1. "This Is Not a Test"
2. "This Is a Test"
3. "Breakfast in NYC"
4. "Okay, Let's Take This Outside"
5. "My Son, the Astronaut"
6. "When I Close My Eyes I Fall in Love"
7. "Allen Died, April Five"
8. "Nine Words"
9. "M.O."
10. "Don't Call Me" (Tom McShane)
11. "Time Loss/Gain"
12. "Orchid"
13. "Saturday Looks Bad to Me"
14. "This Kiss When"

== Personnel ==
Oppenheimer

- Shaun Robinson
- Rocky O'Reilly

Additional musicians

- Anna Fitzsimmons – additional vocals
- Tim Wheeler – vocals on "Orchid"

Production

- John Marshall Smith – mastering
