= Eberg =

Icelandic musician

Einar Tönsberg, also known as Eberg, is an Icelandic musician.

== Musical career ==
Eberg released his first album, Plastic Lions in August 2003, creating 50 hand-made copies, and selling them at £15. Plastic Lions was also mass-produced and distributed by Bad Taste in Iceland, and in July 2004 by Rotator in the UK. The album received rave reviews in the press in 2004. The song "Plastic Lions", his debut single, received airplay on BBC Radio 1.

Eberg's second album Voff Voff has a more organized arrangement of acoustics and electronics that made most of the songs on the album hits in the UK and Iceland. Eberg explains, "Voff Voff is how Icelandic dogs bark, I’ve always tended to be a bit of a barker. I like barking in public and I do way too much of it when I get drunk, and that’s how Icelandic dog barks, hence the name of the album, Voff Voff." The song "Inside Your Head" was used on the television series, The O.C., in the episode "The Summer Bummer", and in the episode "Weevils Wobble But They Don't Go Down" of the series Veronica Mars. The same song was also featured in an Apple iPhone advertisement displayed during the 79th Academy Awards. Voff Voff was released on Dharma Records.

Eberg has a side project called Feldberg who won Song of the year at the 2010 Iceland music awards. The same song is also featured on the Parisian label kitsunes latest compilation nine.

Ebergs latest album, 'Antidote' was released in December 2009 by the QE Company.

== Eharp ==
Made from violin parts and a coat hanger, the "Eharp" is a musical instrument invented by Eberg.
