= Oppenheimer (band) =

Northern Irish indie pop band

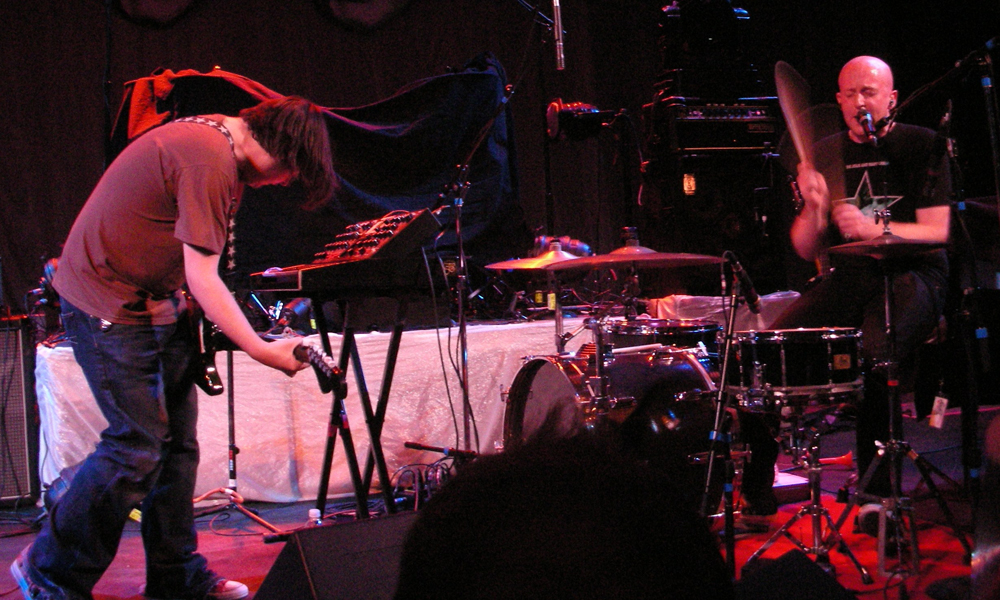
- Oppenheimer onstage in Madison, Wisconsin

Background information
- Origin: Belfast, Northern Ireland
- Genres: Indie pop, alternative
- Years active: 2004–2009
- Labels: Smalltown America (UK); Bar/None Records (US); Fantastic Plastic Records (EU)
- Past members: Shaun Robinson; Rocky O'Reilly

Oppenheimer was an indie pop band from Belfast, Northern Ireland. The band was made up of musicians Shaun Robinson and Rocky O'Reilly. Robinson and O'Reilly were previously members of the now disbanded Belfast group, Torgas Valley Reds. They met in 2003, in Belfast. O'Reilly had been mixing sound and recording Torgas Valley Reds, whom Robinson drummed for. Inspired by their mutual love for Moog synthesizers, vocoders, and airhorns, O'Reilly and Robinson formed Oppenheimer in late 2004, using O'Reilly's spare room to record three songs, which they sent to their favourite labels.

Oppenheimer's music has been used in various North American television shows, including How I Met Your Mother, in the episode "Lucky Penny", Ugly Betty, and Gossip Girl.

== History ==
=== Origins ===
Robinson and O'Reilly began recording music together in 2004 in Belfast. They claim that Oppenheimer is not actually named for physicist Robert Oppenheimer. Instead, the name was selected because the duo found it to be aurally and visually aesthetic. Their record label, Little Ruddiger Records, comes from Bart's Inner Child, a fifth-season episode of The Simpsons in which self-help guru Brad Goodman believes Bart Simpson's name to be "Ruddiger".

=== Oppenheimer (2006–2007) ===
Oppenheimer released their eponymous debut album through Bar/None Records in the United States in July 2006, and through Shock Records in Australia and Fabtone in Japan. Oppenheimer was later issued in the UK via Smalltown America with the initial pressing selling out. The album includes a cover of "Don't Call Me" by Belfast songwriter Tom McShane.

The first single from the album was double A-side 7", with "Breakfast in NYC" and "Truth Or Dare" along with B-side "Getting By". The vinyl single was released in the UK through Smalltown America in April 2006. A video for "Breakfast in NYC", directed by Brian Philip Davis was also produced to coincide with the single release. The music video was made available on the Oppenheimer MySpace page. In support of the album, Oppenheimer toured with Regina Spektor, They Might Be Giants, and Architecture in Helsinki. They also played numerous festivals in North America, as well as the Forfey Festival in August 2006 and the Glasgowbury Festival on 21 July 2007.

=== Take The Whole Midrange and Boost It and dissolution (2008–2012) ===
Oppenheimer's second album, titled Take The Whole Midrange and Boost It was released 3 June 2008 on Bar/None in North America and Fantastic Plastic in Europe. The title of the album is apparently a piece of advice from a Dutch sound manager on one of the band's tours.

To support their second album, the duo opened for OK Go with Longwave in March 2009 on their Spring Tour, followed by The Presidents of the United States of America in their Nor'easter Tour.

The band started recording material for their third album on 19 August 2009. However, on 12 December, Robinson and O'Reilly announced they would be playing for the last time on 19 December. They also scheduled a final EP for early 2010, which was to contain the unfinished material from their previously forthcoming third album. Although it was delayed till 2012, the band's final release, This Racket Takes Its Toll, collects 14 tracks that had not appeared on the duo's first two albums.

=== Post-breakup (2013–present) ===
O'Reilly formed a new band Malibu Shark Attack with rapper Tribe One, from Atlanta, GA featuring guests and collaborators like MC Lars, Dizzy Dustin, Tim Wheeler, Adam WarRock, Rory Friers, Jesse Dangerously, Linley Hamilton and Bee Mick See. They released their debut album in May 2014 on No Dancing Records.

O'Reilly is also a producer and mixer, working out of Start Together Studio in Belfast, N. Ireland. He has worked with artists including And So I Watch You From Afar, Wheatus, In Case of Fire, Gallery Circus, Cashier No. 9 and Math The Band.

== Discography ==
=== Albums ===
- Oppenheimer (2006)
- Take the Whole Midrange and Boost It (2008)
- This Racket Takes Its Toll (2012)

=== Singles ===
- "Breakfast in NYC" / "Truth or Dare" (B-side: "Getting By") (2007)
- "Look Up" (B-side: "The Never Never") (2008)
