= Colonel Blood (album) =

Studio album by Fighting with Wire
- Released: 24 September 2012
- Recorded: 2008 at Dark Horse Studios & Blackbird Studios, Nashville, Tennessee
- Genre: Alternative rock Punk rock
- Length: 38:20
- Label: Xtra Mile
- Producer: Nick Raskulinecz

Fighting with Wire chronology
Man vs Monster (2008)	Colonel Blood (2012)

Singles from Fighting with Wire
- 1. "Waiting On A Way to Believe" Released: 9 July 2012; 2. "Didn't Wanna Come Back Home" Released: 30 August 2012

Colonel Blood is the second album from Northern Ireland band Fighting with Wire, released on 21 September in Ireland and 24 September 2012 in the UK.

== Background & Recording ==
After the band released Man vs Monster, the album appeared on music website, 'Shadowglobe'. Atlantic Records had heard the album through the site and invited them to New York to do a showcase for them. They were offered a record deal and then offered to record their second album in Nashville, Tennessee with producer Nick Raskulinecz, who had previously worked with bands such as the Foo Fighters. The band completed work on their album in late 2008. The album's release date was uncertain for 4 years and by 2012 it still had not been given a release date. In March 2012, the band announced they had departed from Atlantic Records due to the label's failure to release their album for over 2 years. The band intended to release the album independently for free as a gift to their fans who had continued to support them. 'Colonel Blood' was intended to be the first single and was played on Across The Line on 12 March 2012. On 4 March 2012, the band announced on their Facebook page that the album would be released on 2 May 2012. 2 months after the announcement the band then made public they had signed a deal with Xtra Mile Recordings and that the album would now instead be released through them.

== Track listing ==
All tracks are written by Fighting With Wire

Colonel Blood
No.	Title	Length
1.	"Waiting On A Way to Believe"	2:51
2.	"I Won't Let You Down"	3:19
3.	"Colonel Blood"	2:56
4.	"Erase You"	2:58
5.	"Didn't Wanna Come Back Home"	3:34
6.	"Graduate"	4:18
7.	"Dead Memory"	3:40
8.	"Plug Me In"	2:57
9.	"The Great Escape"	2:51
10.	"Blackout"	3:24
11.	"Run for Cover"	5:27
Total length:		38:20
