= And So I Watch You from Afar (album) =

And So I Watch You From Afar

Studio album by And So I Watch You From Afar
- Released: 13 April 2009
- Recorded: 2008–2009
- Genre: Post-rock, instrumental rock, math rock
- Length: 64:36
- Label: Smalltown America

ASIWYFA Albums chronology
And So I Watch You From Afar (2009)	Gangs (2011)

Singles from And So I Watch You from Afar
- 1. "Set Guitars to Kill" Released: 2009

And So I Watch You From Afar is the self-titled, first studio album from the Northern Irish instrumental band And So I Watch You From Afar, released in April 2009. It was re-released in 2013 as a special edition and included four tracks from the Letters EP. The band celebrated the ten year anniversary of the album by performing it in full during a tour in 2019.

== Track listing ==
No.	Title	Length
1.	"Set Guitars to Kill"	5:29
2.	"A Little Bit of Solidarity goes a Long Way"	3:25
3.	"Clench Fists, Grit Teeth...Go!"	6:19
4.	"I Capture Castles"	7:17
5.	"Start a Band"	4:53
6.	"Tip of the Hat, Punch in the Face"	4:21
7.	"If It Ain't Broke...Break It"	6:21
8.	"These Riots Are Just the Beginning"	4:48
9.	"Don't Waste Time Doing Things You Hate"	7:31
10.	"The Voiceless"	6:27
11.	"Eat the City, Eat It Whole"	7:45
Total length:		64:36

Special edition bonus tracks
No.	Title	Length
12.	"S Is For Salamander"	3:59
13.	"D Is For Django The Bastard"	2:32
14.	"B Is For B-Side"	2:49
15.	"K Is For Killing Spree (An Ode To)"	6:43
Total length:		80:39

== Personnel ==
- Rory Friers – guitar
- Tony Wright – guitar
- Jonathan Adger – bass guitar
- Chris Wee – drums, percussion
