= Captain Blood =

Captain Blood may refer to:

- Captain Blood (novel), by Rafael Sabatini
  - Captain Blood (1924 film), based on the Sabatini novel
  - Captain Blood (1935 film), based on the Sabatini novel
  - Fortunes of Captain Blood, a 1950 film based on the Sabatini novel
  - Captain Blood (2025 video game), based on the Sabatini novel
- Captain Blood (1960 film), a French-Italian film based on a novel by a different author
- Captain Blood (1988 video game), unrelated to the Sabatini novel
- Jack Dyer (1913–2003), Australian rules footballer nicknamed Captain Blood

== See also ==
- Colonel Blood (disambiguation)
