= Window Seats =

Musical group from Northern Ireland

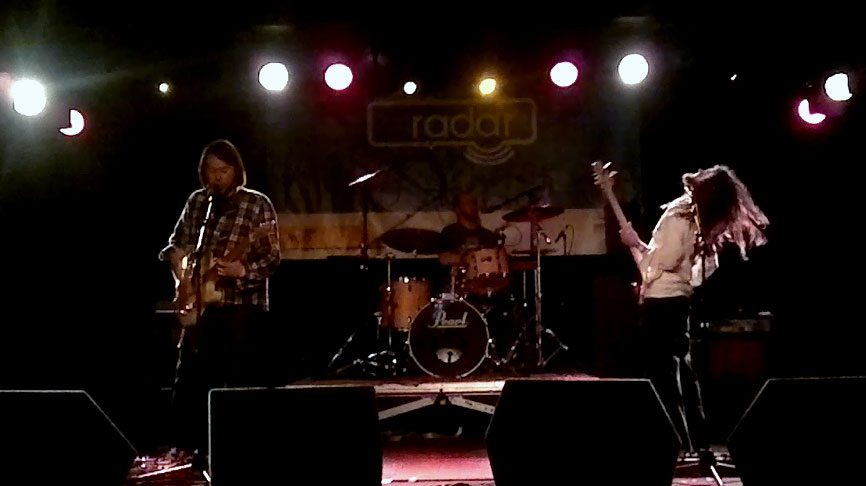
- Live at Queen's University Belfast Students' Union, 2012

Background information
- Origin: Belfast, Northern Ireland
- Genre: Alternative rock
- Years active: 2007–present
- Label: Unsigned
- Members: Jude McCaffrey; Ruth McCavery; Elliot Russell; Tony Furnell
- Past members: Ryan Bradley; Ryan Lilley
- Website: windowseatsofficial.com

Window Seats are an alternative rock band from Belfast, Northern Ireland. They are the first unsigned Northern Ireland artists to be featured on MTV Rocks. The band has self-produced seven music videos, single single releases and an EP under its own record label, Get Out Records. The band was formed in 2007 and currently consists of members Jude McCaffrey (lead vocal, guitar), Ruth McCavery (keyboards, samplers, backing vocal), Elliot Russell (bass guitar) and Tony Furnell (drums, backing vocal).

== History ==
=== 2007–2008: Formation ===
Jude McCaffrey, Tony Furnell and bassist Ryan Lilley formed Window Seats in 2007. Writing and performing together, the band also recorded their music themselves. In 2008 this culminated in the release of a 3-track demo named "Local Superhero". The title track received support from UK radio stations during 2008 and 2009, including BBC Radio 1 and BBC Radio Ulster.

Lilley left the band in 2009 and was replaced by Ryan 'Didsy' Bradley, whom McCaffrey and Furnell had initially met while attending college together in the early 2000s.

2010 single "No Show"

=== 2009–2010: Early singles and videos ===
After Bradley's addition to the lineup, Window Seats began self-producing new single releases and a number of music videos.

In 2010, CD singles "No Show" and "Miss Midnight / Awake" received critical acclaim from the Irish press. As music journalist Jackie Hayden described in Hot Press, "No Show bursts from the traps and runs riot all over your hi-fi before going into stop-start mode driven by demented, rasping drums." AU Magazine described the first track of double A-side "Miss Midnight / Awake" as "featuring some lovely, atmospheric production, a strident vocal performance from Jude McCaffrey." The band produced two music videos for "No Show" (both directed by Bryan Stewart) and one for "Miss Midnight" (directed by Jonathan Beer).

=== 2011–2013: Frozen Bones EP ===
In May 2011 Window Seats made their back catalogue available to download for free, alongside a new song, "Rat" and an accompanying video. In a live review BBC producer Steven Rainey described the song as "head and shoulders above the rest of the set, possessing an effervescent guitar and bass melody that really causes the audience to pay attention, perhaps pointing the way forward for this band of indie-rock adventurers." In August the group performed a live session on BBC Radio, which they filmed and made available online.

2011 single "Local Superhero"

==== "Local Superhero" video ====
In October 2011, after ten months of preparation, Window Seats released their next video and single, a reworking of "Local Superhero". The video production was a collaboration between the band and more than 30 other contributors, notably director Marty Stalker and prop builder Ciaran Larkin, and featured actor Denis Halligan, who had appeared in Game of Thrones and the film Killing Bono. The video was filmed in a set entirely built by the band and their team of volunteers, in the style of a comic book store with props and references from sci-fi and fantasy films and comic book series including Iron Man, Star Wars, Spider-Man and X-Men. Many of the props and costumes (including arc reactors, light sabres, a proton pack and an Inception totem) were created by Ciaran Larkin. Filming took place during summer 2011 and included pyrotechnics on the set, with visual effects added to the footage later.

The music video for "Local Superhero" was nominated for Best Production Effects at the Irish Music Television Awards. BBC Radio 1 presenter Rory McConnell described the video as "the most awesome video ever". Like the band's previous singles, "Local Superhero" was released as a free download via their website.

==== EP release ====
Debut EP Frozen Bones

In December 2011 the group released their debut EP Frozen Bones, which featured both "Local Superhero" and "Rat". The EP was mixed and mastered by Neal Calderwood (General Fiasco, Fighting with Wire). Songs from the EP received comparisons with Joyrider and west coast American rock bands Tad and Far.

Window Seats launched Frozen Bones with a tour across Ireland.

==== Television coverage ====
In January 2012, the "Local Superhero" video was picked up for broadcast on international music television channels MTV Rocks and Kerrang! TV. This made Window Seats the first ever unsigned band from Northern Ireland to have a video shown on MTV Rocks. The video was also named BBC Big Screens 'National Film of the Week' and playlisted on all 22 BBC Big Screens in cities across the UK. It received further support from national television, including in Ireland on TG4's magazine show PONC XL in February 2012. In March 2013, it was showcased on Channel 4's short film programme The Shooting Gallery.

==== "Juliette's Letter" video ====
By February 2012, Window Seats had begun working on their sixth music video. This time the crew was much smaller, with the band taking on full responsibility as writers, directors, editors and producers. Throughout the year the band worked on the video, in between live appearances across Ireland including Forfey Festival in County Fermanagh, Belly Bang festival in County Tipperary and Belfast support slots with Duke Special and Delorentos. The "Juliette's Letter" video and single were launched in November 2012 with a 16-date tour across the UK and Ireland, concluding with a showcase at the 100 Club in London.

== Band members ==
- Jude McCaffrey – lead vocals, guitar (2007–present)
- Ruth McCavery – keyboards, samplers, backing vocals (2024–present)
- Elliot Russell – bass (2015–present)
- Tony Furnell – drums, percussion, backing vocals (2007–present)

Former members

- Ryan Lilley – bass, backing vocals (2007–2009)
- Ryan Bradley – bass, backing vocals (2009–2013)

== Discography ==
Window Seats discography
- Extended plays: 1
- Singles: 6
- Music videos: 7
- Demo: 1

=== Extended plays ===
| Year | EP details | Peak chart positions |
| Year | EP details | UK |
|---|---|---|
| 2011 | Frozen Bones: Released: December 2011; Label: Get Out Records (GETOUT004); Format: CD, Download | — |

=== Singles ===
| Year | Title | Chart Positions | | | | Album |
| Year | Title | UK | IRL | UK Rock | UK Indie | Album |
|---|---|---|---|---|---|---|
| 2008 | "Local Superhero (demo)" | — | — | — | — | Non-album singles |
| 2010 | "No Show" | — | — | — | — | Non-album singles |
| 2010 | "Miss Midnight / Awake" | — | — | — | — | Non-album singles |
| 2011 | "Rat"^{[A]} | — | — | — | — | Frozen Bones EP |
| 2011 | "Local Superhero"^{[A]} | — | — | — | — | Frozen Bones EP |
| 2012 | "Juliette's Letter" | — | — | — | — | Frozen Bones EP |
| 2015 | "Stickle Bricks" | — | — | — | — | Non-album single |
"—" denotes a title that did not chart.

Notes

- A ^ ^{a b} Issued as a free download single from the band's official website.

=== Music videos ===
| Year | Title | Director |
|---|---|---|
| 2010 | "No Show" | Bryan Stewart |
| 2010 | "No Show" | Bryan Stewart |
| 2010 | "Miss Midnight" | Jonathan Beer |
| 2011 | "Rat" | Sean Duncan |
| 2011 | "Local Superhero" | Marty Stalker |
| 2012 | "Juliette's Letter" | Window Seats |
| 2015 | "Stickle Bricks" | Alan Stewart |

== Awards ==
=== IMTV Awards ===
"Local Superhero" was nominated for Best Production Effects at the 2011 Irish Music Television Awards. The video was directed by Marty Stalker.

| Year | Nominee / work | Award | Result |
|---|---|---|---|
| 2011 | "Local Superhero" | Best Production Effects | Nominated |

=== IOV Awards ===
"Local Superhero" was awarded second place in the Best Music Video category at the 2012 Institute of Videography Awards. The video was directed by Marty Stalker.

| Year | Nominee / work | Award | Result |
|---|---|---|---|
| 2012 | "Local Superhero" | Best Music Video | 2nd |
