= Heirs (album) =

Studio album by And So I Watch You From Afar
- Released: 4 May 2015
- Genre: Post-rock; Instrumental rock Math rock
- Length: 43:18
- Label: Sargent House

And So I Watch You From Afar chronology
All Hail Bright Futures (2013)	Heirs (2015)	The Endless Shimmering (2017)

Professional ratings
Aggregate scores
Source	Rating
Metacritic	63/100
Review scores
Source	Rating
The Line of Best Fit	(7/10)
AllMusic	3.5/5 stars
Drowned in Sound	(6/10)

Heirs is the fourth studio album by And So I Watch You From Afar. Released on 4 May 2015, the album was made available to stream through the online music publication The Fader a week before its release, which revealed the track listing of the album.

== Track listing ==
No.	Title	Length
1.	"Run Home"	04:33
2.	"These Secret Kings I Know"	02:39
3.	"Wasps"	02:40
4.	"Redesigned a Million Times"	04:41
5.	"People Not Sleeping"	03:51
6.	"Fucking Lifer"	02:40
7.	"A Beacon, a Compass, an Anchor"	06:17
8.	"Animal Ghosts"	02:48
9.	"Heirs"	07:29
10.	"Tryer, You"	05:45
Total length:		43:23

== Personnel ==
- Rory Friers – guitar, vocals
- Niall Kennedy – guitar, vocals
- Jonathan Adger – bass guitar, vocals
- Chris Wee – drums, percussion, vocals
- Rock O'Reilly – production, mixing, engineering
- Niall Doran – engineering
- Robin Schmidt – mastering
- Sonny Kay – art and layout
