= All Hail Bright Futures =

Studio album by And So I Watch You From Afar
- Released: 15 March 2013
- Recorded: 2011–2012, Start Together Studios; Belfast, Northern Ireland
- Genre: Experimental rock, math rock, instrumental rock
- Length: 42:58
- Label: Sargent House
- Producer: Rocky O'Reilly

And So I Watch You From Afar chronology
Gangs (2011)	All Hail Bright Futures (2013)	Heirs (2015)

Professional ratings
Review scores
Source	Rating
BBC	(Positive)
Sputnikmusic	(2.8/5)

All Hail Bright Futures is the third album from Northern Irish band And So I Watch You From Afar, released on 15 March 2013. It was produced and mixed by Rocky O'Reilly.

Record label Sargent House uploaded a track from the album entitled "Like a Mouse" on 7 December 2012.

And So I Watch You From Afar revealed the track listings on its Bandcamp page on 17 December 2012.

== Track listing ==
All songs are written and composed by And So I Watch You From Afar.

No.	Title	Length
1.	"Eunoia"	2:13
2.	"Big Thinks Do Remarkable"	3:51
3.	"Like A Mouse"	2:39
4.	"Ambulance!"	4:27
5.	"The Stay Golden Pt. 1"	3:25
6.	"The Stay Golden Pt. 2 (Rats on a Rock)"	2:58
7.	"The Stay Golden Pt. 3 (Trails...)"	1:59
8.	"Mend And Make Safe"	4:22
9.	"Ka Ba Ta Bo Da Ka"	4:00
10.	"Things Amazing"	1:31
11.	"All Hail Bright Futures"	4:11
12.	"Young Brave Minds"	7:22
Total length:		42:58

== Digital bonus tracks ==
No.	Title	Length
13.	"Gum"	2:13
14.	"Spiderbox"	3:16
Total length:		48:27

== Personnel ==
- Rory Friers – guitar
- Niall Kennedy – guitar
- Jonathan Adger – bass guitar
- Chris Wee – drums, percussion
- Rocky O'Reilly– production, mixing
- Lee McMahon – engineering
- Robin Schmidt – mastering
