= Gangs (album) =

Studio album by And So I Watch You from Afar
- Released: 29 April 2011
- Recorded: 2010–2011 at Start Together Studio in Belfast, Northern Ireland
- Genre: Post-rock, math rock
- Length: 44:44
- Label: Richter Collective
- Producer: And So I Watch You from Afar, Rocky O'Reilly

And So I Watch You from Afar chronology
And So I Watch You from Afar (2009)	Gangs (2011)	All Hail Bright Futures (2013)

Singles from Gangs
- 1. "Search:Party:Animal" Released: 28 February 2011; 2. "BEAUTIFULUNIVERSE– MASTERCHAMPION" Released: 25 November 2011

Gangs is the second studio album by the Northern Irish post-rock band And So I Watch You from Afar, released on 29 April 2011 on Richter Collective.

== Reception ==
Professional ratings
Aggregate scores
Source	Rating
Metacritic	68/100
Review scores
Source	Rating
Allmusic	3.5/5 stars
Austin Chronicle	2/5 stars
BBC Music	Favourable
Drowned in Sound	9/10
Entertainment.ie	4/5 stars
Kerrang!	3/5 stars
Q	3/5 stars
PopMatters	7/10
Rock Sound	9/10

Gangs was released to positive critical acclaim. At Metacritic, which assigns a normalised rating out of 100 to reviews from mainstream critics, the album received an average score of 68, based on 9 reviews, indicating "generally favorable reviews". Allmusic reviewer Dave Donnelly referred to the album's sound as "weightier and more abrasive than its predecessor" but criticised that it was "tailored for the stage" which "sacrificed some of the beautiful flow and elegant dynamic." He awarded the album three and a half out of five stars. Writing for the Austin Chronicle, Adam Schragin said that Gangs "spins an enormously wrought piece of work that finally matches the band's inflated aspirations with production values" but called the songs "oddly unmemorable" in his two out of five star review. BBC Music writer Brad Barrett praised the album, summarising it as "an album strewn with the debris of a war march, albeit one laced with smirks and triumphant songs" and noted how it "starts to feel textural as opposed to bludgeoning." Simon Jay Catling of Drowned in Sound rated the album nine out of ten and described its music as "maelstrom of dexterity [that] gives way to great waves of squalled sound."

In her four-star review for Entertainment.ie of Gangs, Jenny Mulligan said "its eight tracks come together harmoniously, frequently self-referencing with repeated patterns and sequences, and moving with ease from the band's characteristic ferocious vigour." Kerrang! awarded the album three out of five stars and wrote "while this is as trying and testing as it is unique, it's certainly not without its charms", and Q called Gangs "monstrously heavy [and] full of tense, nervous energy", awarding the album three stars. Writing for PopMatters, Brice Ezell said "particularly distinctive are the guitar lines that, while never at the level of Steve Vai-like shred, are quite tricky and at times groovy" and praised the album's mixture of post-rock and math rock style, in his seven out of ten review. Rock Sound writer Pete Withers rated Gangs nine out of ten and said "Seamlessly flowing from repetitive, hypnotic guitar patterns to delectable swathes of effortless grace, the record builds and burns, stacking surprise upon surprise before breaking it all back down to delicately strummed moments of reflective reprieve."

Gangs was nominated for the Choice Music Prize in January 2012, though lost out to Oceans of Frequency by Jape.

== Track listing ==
All tracks are written by And So I Watch You from Afar.

No.	Title	Length
1.	"BEAUTIFULUNIVERSEMASTERCHAMPION"	5:52
2.	"Gang (starting never stopping)"	5:26
3.	"Search:Party:Animal"	5:18
4.	"7 Billion People All Alive at Once"	5:44
5.	"Think:Breathe:Destroy"	4:43
6.	"Homes – Ghost Parlor KA -6 To..."	2:46
7.	"Homes – ...Samara to Belfast"	9:50
8.	"Lifeproof"	5:05
Total length:		44:44

== Personnel ==
All personnel credits adapted from the Gangs' online release notes.

And So I Watch You from Afar

- Rory Friers – guitar
- Tony Wright – guitar
- Jonathan Adger – bass
- Chris Wee – drums, percussion

Technical personnel

- And So I Watch You from Afar – production
- Rocky O'Reilly – production, engineering, mixing
- Lee McMahon – engineering assistant
- Robin Schmidt – mastering

== Chart positions ==
Chart (2011)	Peak position
Irish Albums Chart	28
Irish Independent Albums Chart	10
UK Indie Chart	35
