= The Endless Shimmering =

Studio album by And So I Watch You from Afar
- Released: 20 October 2017
- Genre: Post-rock; Instrumental rock Math rock
- Length: 43:56
- Label: Sargent House

And So I Watch You from Afar chronology
Heirs (2015)	The Endless Shimmering (2017)	Jettison (2022)

The Endless Shimmering is the fifth full-length studio album by And So I Watch You from Afar, released on 20 October 2017. The album's cover is a photograph taken by drummer Chris Wee's friend of his daughter with their dog.

== Reception ==
Professional ratings
Aggregate scores
Source	Rating
Metacritic	77/100
Review scores
Source	Rating
AllMusic	3.5/5 stars
DIY	4/5 stars
PopMatters	8/10
The Skinny	3/5 stars

The Endless Shimmering received positive reviews from critics. On Metacritic, the album holds a score of 77/100 based on 5 reviews, indicating "generally favorable reviews".

== Track listing ==
The Endless Shimmering
No.	Title	Length
1.	"Three Triangles"	4:57
2.	"A Slow Unfolding of Wings"	4:16
3.	"Terrors of Pleasure"	5:19
4.	"Dying Giants"	7:26
5.	"All I Need is Space"	4:14
6.	"The Endless Shimmering"	4:10
7.	"Mullally"	3:53
8.	"I'll Share A Life"	6:23
9.	"Chrysalism"	3:18
Total length:		43:56
