= VerseChorusVerse =

- Born: Michael Anthony Wright; Ballymoney, Northern Ireland
- Genres: Alternative rock; folk
- Occupations: Musician; Singer-songwriter; Writer; Actor
- Instruments: Vocals; Guitar; Piano; Harmonica; Drums
- Years active: 2004–present
- Formerly of: And So I Watch You From Afar

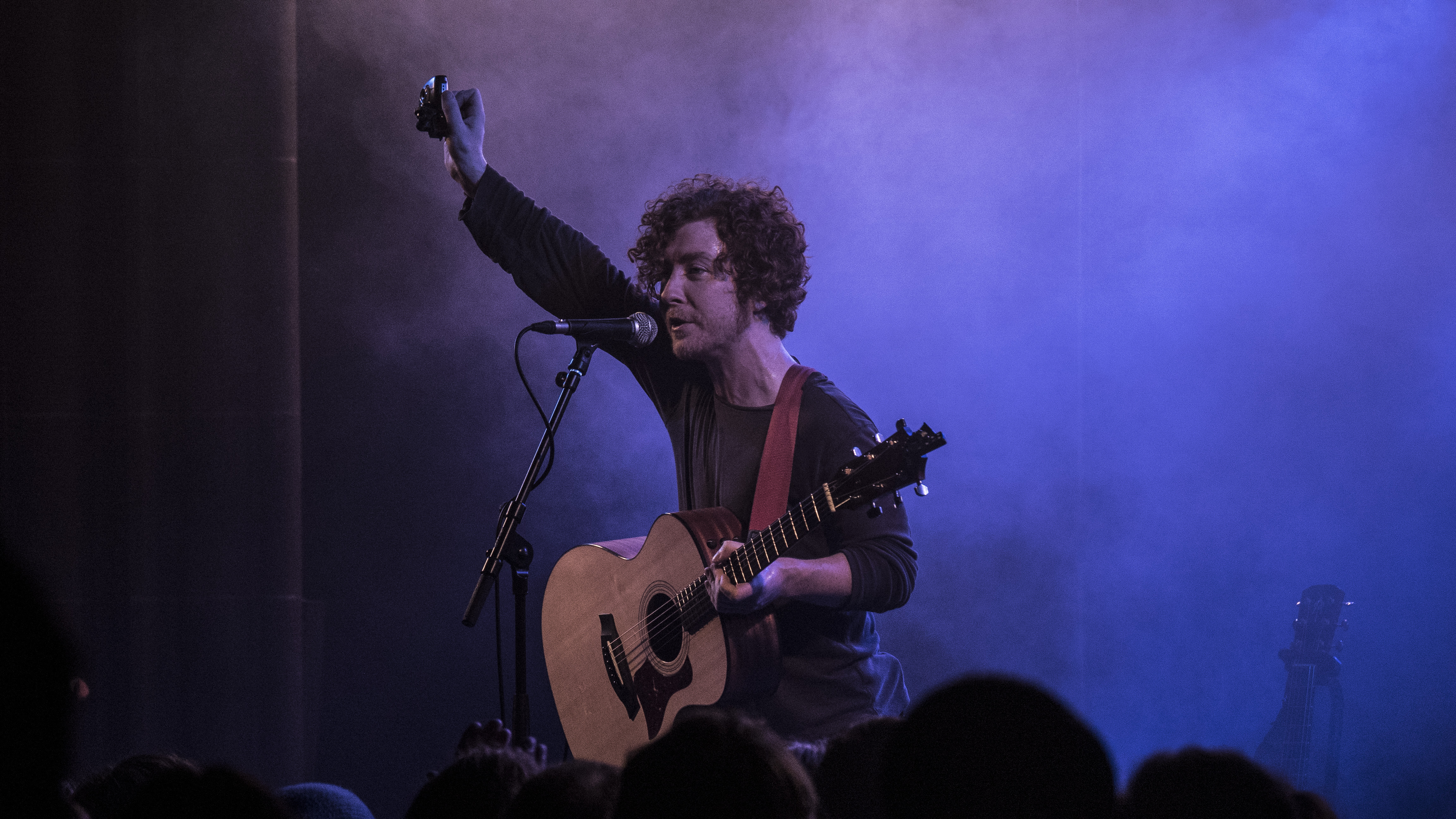
VerseChorusVerse - Tony Wright

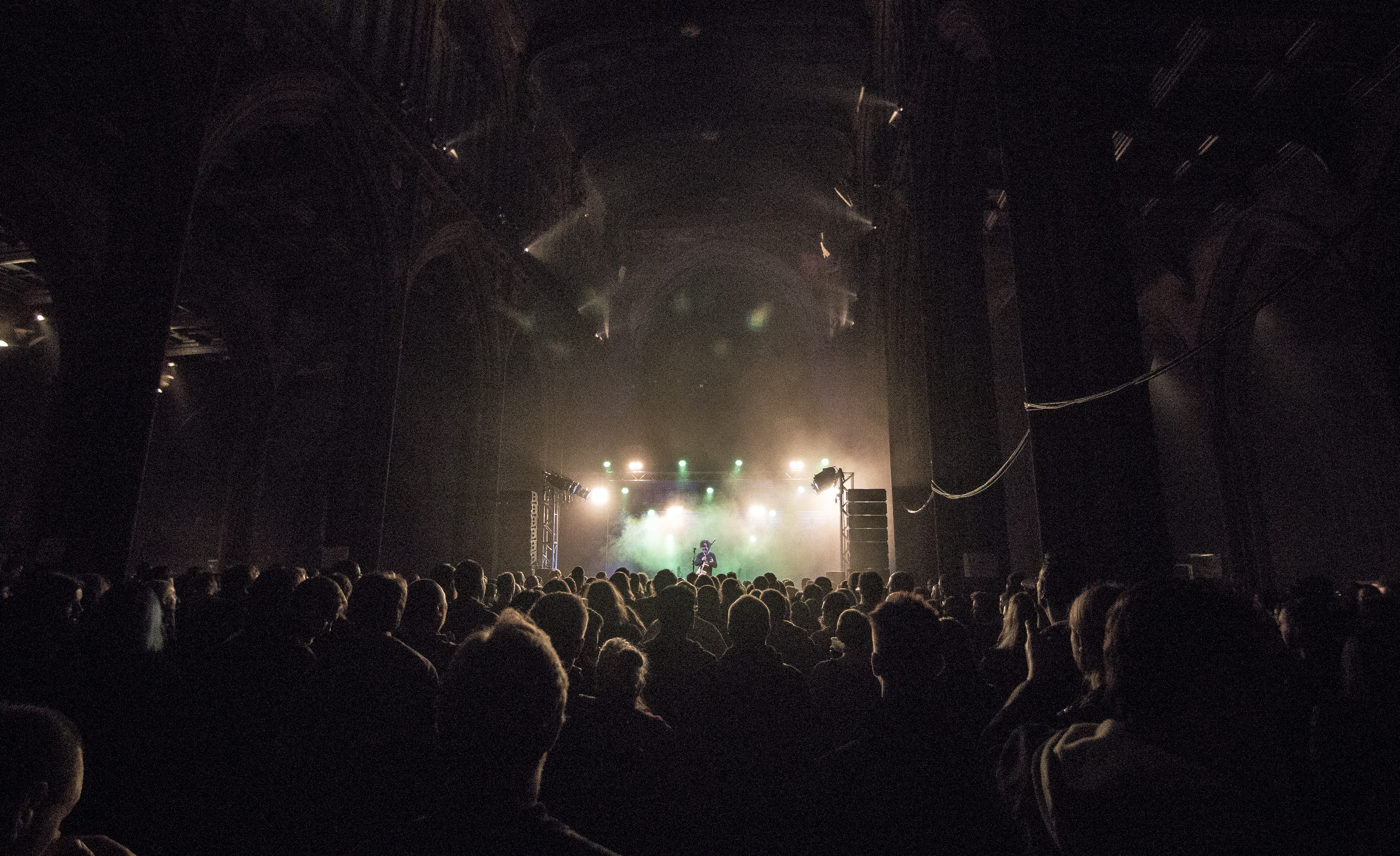
VerseChorusVerse - Manchester Cathedral, 13 October 2015

VerseChorusVerse is the musical moniker of the Irish musician, writer and actor Tony Wright. He is the founding member of And So I Watch You From Afar.

== Background ==
Born Michael Anthony Wright, he began learning the guitar at age eight, taught by his mother, and at age thirteen he started performing in public. He formed And So I Watch You From Afar in 2004 with members of his previous band. Wright left the band in unclear circumstances late 2011 after releasing two albums and three EPs.

== Solo career ==
Wright has released several albums post-ASIWYFA, VerseChorusVerse (2014), Say & Do (2015), Fawkes Ache as The Tragedy of Dr Hannigan (2017), outro (2018), and what if we won (2021) as well as three EPs and two singles.

To accompany his third EP, "The Inches EP", Wright moved into the moving visual art medium for the first time, releasing a video for each track. The first eponymous album was produced by Iain Archer and was nominated for the 2014 NI Music Prize. In 2015 he released Say & Do, a collaborative album of his original songs produced by and featuring David Lyttle. It charted at number 21 on the UK iTunes album charts and number 1 on the Amazon Blues Charts.

Wright released an album, Fawkes Ache, with his side project, The Tragedy of Dr Hannigan, in 2017.

On 25 June 2018 Wright released his third album, "outro". The Thin Air saw the album as "a return to the edge & dynamic he brought ASIWYFA". The Irish Times stated the album, "...touches on a dazzling array of styles and sees Wright at the peak of his powers, writing, performing and releasing the best material he’s done since the first two, classic ASIWYFA albums" and "his VerseChorusVerse creative vehicle has grown into a fully fledged musical entity, effortlessly creating songs that can uplift and comfort – which is ultimately what great music, and art, should be all about".

In 2017, he finished filming for his debut motion picture, a small role in the biopic of Bert Trautmann, The Keeper, which was released in early 2019. He also contributed writing and co-starred in the popular web-series, "The Also-Rans".

His contribution to Arts from Northern Ireland was recognised and rewarded by becoming Artist in Residence at The MAC Belfast for July through to December 2018. During this time he published his first book, Chapter & Verse(ChorusVerse) - Another Dickhead on the Road. The book was named as one of the Irish Times music books of the year.

In 2019, Wright released a double A side single, "Hold On (A Subtle Act of Rebellion)/There Will Come Soft Rains", with all proceeds going to the Northern Ireland division of the charity, Help Musicians UK.

In 2024 Wright collaborated with Bill Drummond and Tracey Moberly in the production of a feature film called "STAY" shot at Drummond's Curfew Tower in County Antrim. Wright was the only actor in the film in which he voiced a Puppet appropriation of Elvis Presley as well as performing as an unnamed artist. The film accompanied an album of the same name involving several other Irish songwriters including Duke Special. It premiered at the "25 Comeback Special" in Cushendall in August 2025.

== Discography ==
- VCV EP (Hunter Records, 2011)
- Six Songs - Charity Covers EP - Now Deleted (Hunter Records, 2012)
- The Inches EP (Third Bar, 2013)
- VerseChorusVerse (Third Bar, 2014)
- Say & Do (with David Lyttle) (Lyte Records, 2015)
- The New Paranoia - Single (Kobalt Music, 2016)
- Fawkes Ache (as "The Tragedy of Dr Hannigan") (Kobalt Music, 2017)
- outro (Kobalt Music, 2018)
- "Hold On (A Subtle Act of Rebellion)" / "There Will Come Soft Rains" - Charity Single (Kobalt Music, 2019)
- what if we won (Hunter Records, 2021)
