= Take the Whole Midrange and Boost It =

Studio album by Oppenheimer
- Released: 3 June 2008
- Recorded: March – October 2007
- Studio: Jazzy City Studios (US); Mississippi Studios (US); Start Together Studios (UK)
- Genre: indie pop electronica
- Length: 30:05
- Label: Bar/None, Fantastic Plastic

Oppenheimer chronology
| Oppenheimer (2006) | Take the Whole Midrange and Boost It (2008) | This Racket Takes Its Toll (2012) |

Take the Whole Midrange and Boost It is the second studio album by the Belfast indie-pop duo Oppenheimer, released on 3 June 2008 through Fantastic Plastic in the UK and Bar/None Records in the US. The album was nominated for the 2008 Choice Music Prize.

== Recording and production ==
Rocky O'Reilly and Shaun Robinson recorded Take the Whole Midrange and Boost It between March and October 2007. According to O'Reilly, the income from commercial usage of tracks from their previous album, Oppenheimer, was crucial in funding the recording of Take the Whole Midrange and Boost It.

The band used multi-tracked elements such as layers of distorted guitars to lend a more live sound to the album. They also experimented with recording in different spaces to create distinct reverb effects. Recorded in summer 2007, the track "Support Our Truths" was the first recording produced at O'Reilly's Belfast studio Start Together. The drums were played inside the building's freight elevator. The band reached out to Matt Caughthran of the hardcore punk band The Bronx to record guest vocals for the track "The Never Never".

== Themes ==
Lyrically, the album is rife with pop culture references, especially to American pop culture, due to the band's interest in American film and literature. However, the title of "Stephen McCauley for President" refers not to the American author but instead to the BBC Radio Foyle host.

== Reception ==
Professional ratings
Review scores
| Source | Rating |
|---|---|
| AllMusic | 3.5/5 stars |
| Drowned in Sound | (7/10) |
| Alarm | (favorable) |

Take the Whole Midrange and Boost It received generally positive reviews from critics. Tim Sendra, in a review for Allmusic, called the album a "self-contained bubble of weird pop giddiness". However, Sendra also noted that the album's lack of a "clearly defined" genre or style might deter wider commercial success. Drowned in Sound reviewer Dom Gourlay wrote that the band was "embracing all genres from shoegaze to metal and hip-hop". Gourlay concluded that the album was "as near to twisted pop perfection as you'll find anywhere", though both reviewers expressed a similar sentiment that the album could be sonically cloying, with Gourlay describing it as "saccharine" and Sendra writing that the music "makes no sense but sounds the way cotton candy tastes". In a review for Alarm, Mike Hilleary noted the influence of Brian Eno, Kraftwerk, and My Bloody Valentine, among others.

The album was nominated for Raidió Teilifís Éireann's Choice Music Prize, which is awarded annually to one album by an artist residing in the Republic of Ireland or Northern Ireland.

== Track listing ==
1. "Major Television Events"
2. "Look Up"
3. "Cate Blanchett"
4. "Only Goal & Winner"
5. "Take the Whole Midrange and Boost It"
6. "Stephen McCauley for President"
7. "Support Our Truths"
8. "The Blue Rose"
9. "Before and After the Quake"
10. "Fireworks Are Illegal in the State of New Jersey"
11. "The Never Never"
12. "I Don't Care What Anyone Says About You, I Think You're Alright"

== Personnel ==
Oppenheimer

- Rocky O'Reilly
- Shaun Robinson

Additional musicians

- Matt Caughthran – vocals on "The Never Never"
- Hornby – guitar on "Before and After the Quake"
- Angie McCrisken – violin, vocals

Production

- Jon Marshall Smith – engineer, mastering
- Rocky O'Reilly – engineer
