= LaFaro =

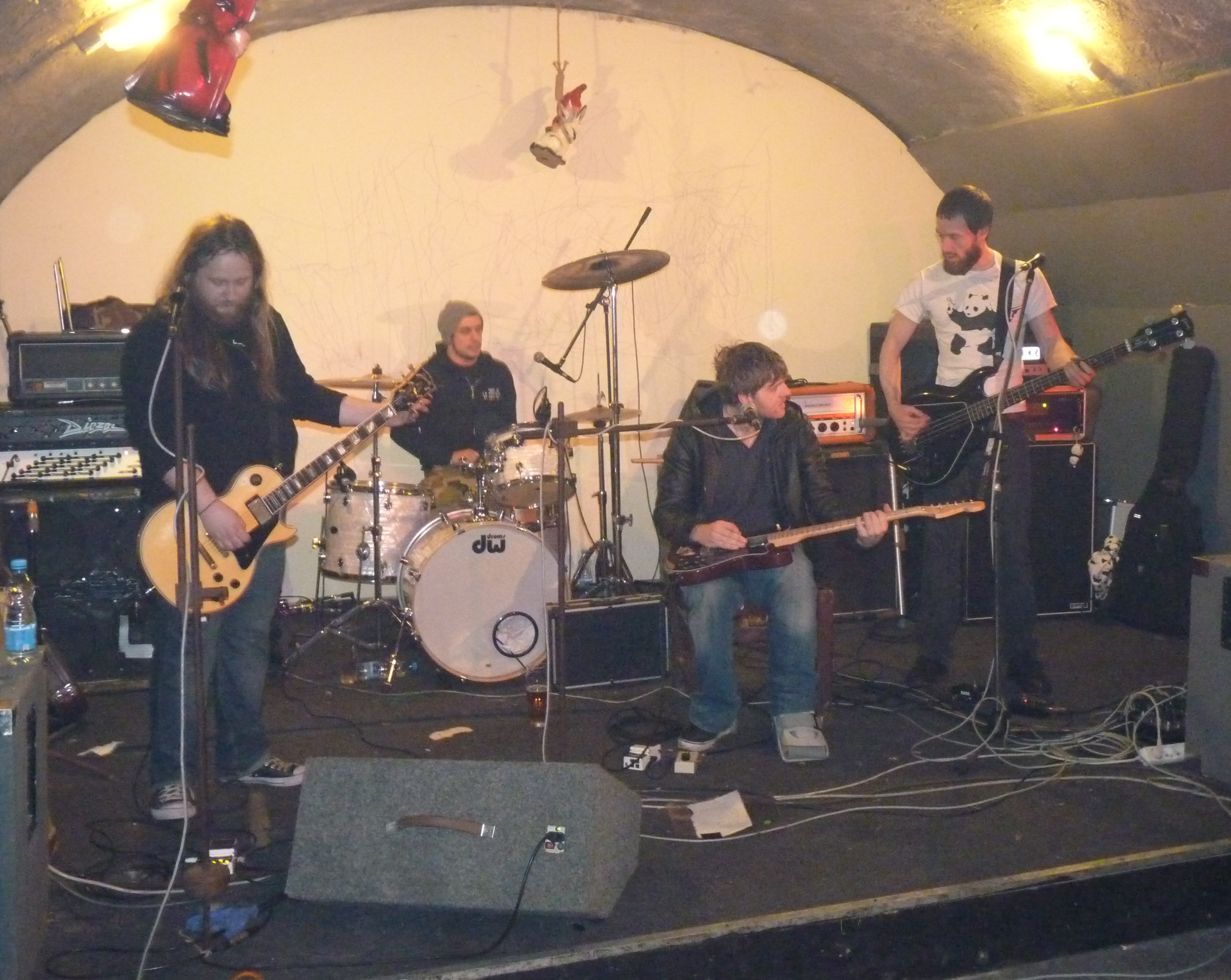

Background information
- Origin: Belfast, Northern Ireland
- Genres: Alternative rock Punk rock Post-hardcore; Noise rock
- Years active: 2004 – 2014
- Label: Smalltown America Records (UK)
- Members: Jonny Black; Dave Magee; Alan Lynn; Herb Magee
- Past members: Anna Fitzsimons; Oisin O'Doherty; Cahir O'Doherty
- Website: Official

LaFaro were a four-piece alternative rock band from Belfast, Northern Ireland. They consisted of Jonny Black (guitar/vocals), Dave Magee (guitar), Herb Magee (Bass) and Alan Lynn (drums).

== History ==
Formed in 2004 LaFaro have been described as: "old school post hardcore sounds with just drums, guitars and big chunky distorted bass...they are one of the finest Irish Alt-Rock bands you are likely to hear in quite a while".

Once signed to Field Records, and while with the label released the well received "LaFaro EP" in 2006 containing the lead track "Tupenny Nudger". The band had been voted BBC Northern Ireland Across the Line Local Act of the Year for 2 years running and had features in Hot Press and Alternative Ulster magazines. They had also played support slots for Ash, The Pogues, Oppenheimer and Fighting With Wire, as well as shows at the SXSW Festival 2007 in Texas.

They also contributed the track "Mr Heskey", to the "Oh Yeah Sessions '08" album a showcase for local Northern Irish music recorded at Belfast's Oh Yeah music centre which was released in April of that year. The band released the 5 track "EP2" towards the end of 2008.

"Tupenny Nudger" was awarded the title of 'Best Northern Irish song of the past 5 years' in a poll conducted by AU magazine, the results of which were published in October 2008, beating Snow Patrol and Ash.

After a successful UK tour in February/March 2009 supporting Fighting With Wire and And So I Watch You From Afar, the band came home to play one of their biggest shows to date at the re-opening of Belfast's Ulster Hall as part of the BBC's 'Do You Remember The First Time' show. They then went straight into the studio to record their debut album. LaFaro spent the following months writing and gigging around Ireland including a performance on the main stage at Glasgowbury 2009, being handpicked to support The Pogues by the band, and their second show in the Ulster Hall in 2009.

The band toured constantly in 2010 starting in the UK in January through to the end of February. Their debut album LaFaro was released on Smalltown America Records on May 10, 2010 to universal acclaim both at home and on the mainland. Both "Tupenny Nudger" and "Leningrad" were under heavy rotation on Zane Lowe's BBC Radio One Evening show.

Tours at home and across Europe in support of Helmet rounded out the band's most successful year to date.

Herb Magee, bassist and twin brother of guitarist Dave Magee, announced his initial departure from the band while on stage at the Pigstock festival in 2011.

Fellow Northern Ireland musician Cahir O'Doherty from Fighting With Wire filled in on bass duties for the release of "Easy Meat" Cahir returned to Fighting With Wire in December 2011. At this point, Cahir's brother, Oisin O'Doherty took over on bass.

The band's last album Easy Meat was released on 3 October 2011 to excellent reviews. The title track was released in the summer of 2011, with a second single, "Meat Wagon" released on 3 September.

Herb Magee returned on bass guitar in mid-2012. LaFaro headlined a stage at Eurosonic 2012 and completed an extensive European tour in the winter of 2012 visiting 10 countries in their 32 date tour.

They also accompanied Therapy? on the Irish leg of their 2013 tour.

More recently Dave Magee has been playing guitar with Little Matador whilst Dave, Herb Magee and Alan Lynn briefly worked with Cahir O'Doherty under the name GOONS. Herb continues to release electronic music under the name Arvo Party and was nominated for the NI Music Prize in 2019. Alan Lynn now performs as EXHALERS and has released three well-received albums.

== Members ==
- Jonny Black - Vocals / rhythm guitar
- Dave Magee - Lead guitar / BV
- Alan Lynn - Drums / BV
- Herb Magee - Bass / BV

== Former members ==
- Anna Fitzsimons Bass / BV
- Oisin O'Doherty Bass / BV
- Cahir O'Doherty Bass / BV

== Discography ==
=== EPs and singles ===
- "Scott" (2006) - split single with Public Relations Exercise
- LaFaro EP (2007)
- EP2 (2008)
- "Tupenny Nudger" (2010) Single
- "Ballad of Burnt Dave" (2010) Single
- "Easy Meat" (2011) Single
- "Meat Wagon" (2011) Single

=== Albums ===
Year	Album details	Peak chart positions
Year	Album details	IRL
2010	LaFaro: Released: 2010; Label: Smalltown America; Formats: CD Download	—
2011	Easy Meat: Released: 2011; Label: Smalltown America; Formats: CD, Download	—
"—" denotes a title that did not chart.
