= Man vs Monster =

Studio album by Fighting with Wire
- Released: 10 March 2008
- Recorded: 2007 at Manor Park Studios
- Genre: Alternative rock Punk rock
- Length: 46:59
- Label: Smalltown America

Singles from Fighting with Wire
- 1. "Everyone Needs a Nemesis" Released: June 23rd 2008; 2. "All For Nothing" Released: October 20th 2008; 3. "Sugar" Released: March 2nd 2009

Man vs Monster is the debut album from Northern Ireland trio Fighting with Wire, which was released on 10 March 2008. The band launched their album tour at the Nerve Centre in their home town, Derry on 1 December 2007.

Rock Sound placed the album at No. 71 on their Top 75 Albums of 2008 list.

== Critical reception ==
Professional ratings
Review scores
Source	Rating
AbsolutePunk.net	(86/100) link
AU Magazine	(9/10) link
BBC	(Favourable) link
Drowned in Sound	(8/10) link
Rock Sound	(8/10)
Kerrang!	4/5 stars
Ultimate-Guitar	link

"Everyone Needs a Nemesis" was labelled as The Hottest Record in the World Today by BBC Radio 1 DJ, Zane Lowe on January 28, 2008. When announcing the band, to amusement of fans, Lowe actually called the Irish Alt-Rock trio Fighting with Wires. The DJ has stated that having "listened and listened and listened", the album is "pretty much flawless". The band also received largely positive reviews from Rock Sound (8/10) and Kerrang! magazine.

== Track listing ==
All tracks are written by Fighting With Wire.

Man vs Monster
No.	Title	Length
1.	"Cut the Transmission"	2:49
2.	"Everyone Needs a Nemesis"	3:31
3.	"All for Nothing"	3:01
4.	"Long Distance"	3:24
5.	"Strength in Numbers"	3:04
6.	"Into the Ground"	3:16
7.	"Sugar"	3:04
8.	"Make a Fist"	3:00
9.	"My Armoury"	3:01
10.	"The Quiet"	4:38
11.	"This Body Is in Danger"	14:11
Total length:		46:59

== Single releases ==
- "Everyone Needs a Nemesis" (2008)
- "All For Nothing" (2008)
- "Sugar" (2009)
