= Pocket Billiards (band) =

- Origin: Belfast, Northern Ireland
- Genres: Ska/punk
- Years active: 2001–present
- Members: Chris Savage; Chuck Neely; Tim Rooney; Anto Ashe; Steeky Keys; Matt Rooney; Matthew McC; Elaine Sax; Dee Mullholland
- Website: www.pocketbilliards.co.uk

Pocket Billiards are a Belfast-based 9-piece ska/punk/rock band who originally formed in 2001. The band fuse ska, reggae and dub with punk rock and heavy riffs, creating an energetic and powerful sound.

== History ==
=== 2001 - 2004 ===
The band was formed in early 2001 by Chris Savage and Chuck Neely. Initially they got together to explore the sounds of ska with the goal of merging it with more modern styles of music to create a new sound. Within months of forming they had recruited a brass section, keyboard, drums and bass. The band's first ever gig was with Californian Ska Punk band Mad Caddies in The Limelight (Belfast). By the end of 2002 the band had released their first 4 track demo "Skandalous".

=== 2005 - 2009 ===
The next few years saw several line-up changes and a steady climb in the band's popularity. They continued to get support slots performing with many of their idols including The Selecter, Bad Manners and Neville Staples (The Specials). In 2006 they made a DIY album using home recording equipment called "Outlook Not So Good", an homage to the Magic 8 Ball prediction.

=== 2009 - 2011 ===
In October 2009 Pocket Billiards released their first full-length Studio Album (self-titled) at a sell-out show in the Black Box (Cathedral Quarter, Belfast). They subsequently performed at several 2010 Festivals in Northern Ireland including Pigstock, Sunflower Festival and Glasgowbury. In summer 2011 Pocket Billiards were invited to support The Specials at Belfast's iconic Belsonic Festival, a performance they were "pretty much born to play". In Autumn 2011 Pocket Billiards were nominated for "Best Live Act" in the first-ever Northern Ireland Music Awards that took place at Ulster Hall, Belfast on 2 November.

=== 2012 ===
Pocket Billiards released their second studio album "Last Chance to Dance" at Belfast's Mandela Hall on May 12, 2012. In July 2012 they toured Luxembourg, France, Basque Country and Catalonia. The summer of 2012 also saw the band return to some of Northern Ireland's biggest festivals, playing main stage slots at Pigstock, Sunflower Fest and Glasgowbury.

== Discography ==
Pocket Billiards discography at MusicBrainz

- 2001 "Skandalous" - 4 Track Demo recorded at Einstein Studios in Co. Antrim
- 2005 "Outlook Not So Good" - A collection of tracks recorded and mixed at home
- 2009 "Pocket Billiards" - First full-length studio album, self-titled, 10 Tracks, recorded at Start Together Studios in Belfast
- 2011 "Pocket Billiards (Limited edition white vinyl)" - A re-release of the self-titled album featuring 5 new bonus tracks. Vinyl production by Gary Fahy (Punkerama Records). Only 300 of these were produced.
- 2012 "Last Chance To Dance" - Second Studio Album, 11 Tracks, recorded at Start Together Studios in Belfast

== Band members ==
- Chris Savage (Lead vocal, Guitar)
- Chuck Neely (Backing Vocal, Guitar)
- Tim Rooney (Drums)
- Anto Ashe (Bass)
- Steeky Keys (Keyboard, Trombone)
- Matt Rooney (Trumpet)
- Matthew McCormac (Tenor Saxophone)
- Elaine Sax (Alto Saxophone)
- Dee Mullholland (Trumpet)
