= Megafauna (album) =

Studio album by And So I Watch You from Afar
- Released: 9 August 2024
- Recorded: September 2022
- Studio: Attica Audio (Donegal, Ireland)
- Length: 43:24
- Label: Velocity
- Producer: And So I Watch You from Afar; Tommy McLaughlin

And So I Watch You from Afar chronology
Jettison (2022)	Megafauna (2024)

Singles from Megafauna
- 1. "Do Mór" Released: 17 May 2024

Professional ratings
Review scores
Source	Rating
AllMusic	3.5/5 stars
Clash	8/10
Hot Press	8/10
The Irish Times	4/5 stars

Megafauna is the seventh studio album by Northern Irish band And So I Watch You from Afar. It was released on 9 August 2024. The album was preceded by the release of the single, "Do Mór", released on 17 May 2024.

== Track listing ==
All tracks are written by Rory Friers, Niall Kennedy, Chris Wee, and Ewen Friers.

Megafauna track listing
No.	Title	Length
1.	"North Coast Megafauna"	6:27
2.	"Do Mór"	4:14
3.	"Gallery of Honour"	5:32
4.	"Mother Belfast (Part 1)"	5:51
5.	"Mother Belfast (Part 2)"	3:46
6.	"Years Ago"	5:14
7.	"Any Joy"	3:09
8.	"Button Days"	3:19
9.	"Me and Dunbar"	5:52
Total length:		43:24

== Personnel ==
And So I Watch You from Afar

- Rory Friers – guitar, production, mixing, string arrangements, piano arrangements, photography
- Niall Kennedy – guitar, production
- Chris Wee – drums, production
- Ewen Friers – bass, production

Additional personnel

- Tommy McLaughlin – production, mixing, engineering
- Katie Tavini – mastering
- Michael Keeney – piano, string arrangements, piano arrangements
- Arco String Quartet – strings
- Ciara McMillan – cover photography
- Nicholas Sayers – band photography
- Glenn Kennedy – design

== Charts ==
Chart performance for Megafauna
Chart (2024)	Peak position
UK Album Downloads (OCC)	34
