= Feldberg (band) =

- Origin: Reykjavík, Iceland
- Genres: Folk, pop, electro
- Years active: 2009–present
- Labels: Smalltown America Records, Rallye Label, Cod Music, Kitsune; DO IT Records 2012
- Website: www.feldbergmusic.com

Feldberg is an Icelandic musical duo formed by Eberg (Einar Tönsberg) and Rósa Birgitta Ísfeld from Reykjavík. Their debut album, Don't Be a Stranger, was first released in Iceland in 2009 on Cod Music. At the Icelandic Music Awards (IMA) in 2010, they were nominated for three awards and won for Best Song for their track "Dreamin'", which was subsequently featured on the Kitsune Compilation 9. Their music has been extensively used for advertising in Iceland; the airline Icelandair use "Dreamin'" as their in-flight music choice. The new Feldberg album will be released in 2012 and the band have featured some of the new songs at their latest concerts in Tokyo supporting Casio Kids and Le Corps Mince De Francois.

== History ==
The pair released their debut album, Don't Be a Stranger, in Iceland in 2009 via Cod Music. The album was subsequently released by Rallye Label in Japan in 2010, and by Smalltown America Records in the United Kingdom and Ireland in 2011. They released their first digital single, "I'm Not Thinking of You", via Smalltown America Records on 13 December 2010. That same month, they played a series of concerts in New York City in small venues such as The Living Room and Union Hall with Leaves drummer Nói Steinn Einarsson playing alongside them.

They were nominated for three awards at the 2010 Icelandic Music Awards: Song of the Year, Album of the Year, and Composer of the Year. They won the award for Best Song for their track "Dreamin'". It was also featured on the Kitsuné Maison Compilation 9: Petit Bateau Edition, and Icelandair has used it as an in-flight music choice when passengers board the plane.

In January 2012 Feldberg signed a rest of the world record deal with DO IT Records.

They are currently writing and recording their second album due Spring 2013, followed by a 2013 tour.

== Discography ==
=== Albums ===
Studio

- 2009: Don't Be a Stranger (2009)

=== Singles ===
- 2009: "You and Me"
- 2010: "I'm Not Thinking of You"
- 2015: "Ó, þú"

== Awards ==
=== Icelandic Music Awards nominations ===
The Icelandic Music Awards were presented on 13 March at the Reykjavík Opera House. Feldberg received three nominations.

- IMA 2010 Song of the Year Award [2010] - Won
- IMA 2010 Album of the Year Award [2010] - Nominated
- IMA 2010 Composer of the Year Award [2010] - Nominated
