= All for Nothing (band) =

- Origin: Rotterdam
- Genres: punk rock, hardcore punk
- Years active: 2002-2015
- Website: www.allfornothing.nl

All for Nothing is a Rotterdam band consisting of five members. The music consists of punk rock, metal and hardcore influences.

== History ==
The debut album Start At Zero was released in July 2004 by Tocado Records. Start At Zero was written as a four-man formation. The recording took place under the direction of Patrick DeLabie in Studio 195.

After positive reactions to their debut, the band performed with bands from the United States, the Netherlands and Germany, Bane, Comeback Kid, and Parkway Drive.

In the autumn of 2005 frontwoman Cindy van der Heijden joined the ranks and took the lead vocals for her account. On 26 September 2006 bassist Normen Sam-Sin left the band after 6 years. Badr van der Meijden took over his role.

At the end of 2006, the recordings of the Can't Kill What's Inside album took place at the Waterfront Studio in Rotterdam. Mixing took place in 'de Studio' in Belgium and mastering was done in the United States by Alan Douches.

In August 2007 both guitarist Melvin Sam-Sin and bass player Badr van der Meijden stopped for personal reasons with All for Nothing. Shortly after their departure they were replaced by Abdulla Al-tamimi (former Throwing Bricks) as bassist, and Sebastiaan Buijsman (former Samaritan) as guitarist.

In March 2014 they started a tour through China, where they performed with other bands. The tour ended on April 21.

== Members ==
Current band members

- Roel van der Sluis - drummer (2015–present)
- Ernst-Jan Smits - guitarist (2002–present)
- Cindy van der Heijden - vocalist (2005–present)
- Joost van Laake - bassist (2013–present)
- Tim van Tilburg - guitarist (2015–present)

Former band members

- Richard van Liessum - drummer (2002 - 2011)
- Marcel Helder - guitarist (2002 - 2004)
- Leon van Dongen - vocalist (2004 - 2005)
- Normen Sam-Sin - bassist (2002 - 2006)
- Badr van der Meijden - bassist (2006 - 2007)
- Melvin Sam-Sin - guitarist (2004 - 2007)
- Sebastiaan Buijsman - guitarist (2007 - 2012)
- Abdulla Al-tamimi - bassist (2007 - 2012)
- Jim van de Kerkhof - drummer (2011 - 2015)
- Arjan Boertje - guitarist (2013 - 2015)

== Discography ==
- Untitled demo with Ernst-Jan on vocals 2003
- Start at Zero (debut album) 2004
- Untitled demo with Cindy on vocals 2005
- Can't Kill What's Inside (album, vinyl and cd) 2007
- Solitary (ep) 2008
- Miles & Memories (album, cd) 2009
- To Live And Die For (album, cd) 2012
- What Lies Within Us (album, cd) 2014
- Minds Awake / Hearts Alive (album, cd) 2017
