= List of short stories by David R. Bunch =

This list combines material found in several bibliographies of science fiction writer David R. Bunch. It should not be considered exhaustive, because no definitive Bunch bibliography is known to exist.

Title	Date	Collected in	First magazine publication	Second magazine publication
2064, or Thereabouts	September 1964	Moderan	Fantastic	none
A Complete Father	January 1960	Moderan	Fantastic	none
A Glance at the Past	April 1959	Moderan	Diversion	Fantastic (Oct 1970)
A Husband's Share	October 1960	Moderan	Fantastic	none
A Little At All Times	Summer 1969	(uncollected)	Perihelion #7	none
A Little Girl's Spring Day in Moderan	September–October 1979	(uncollected)	Galaxy	none
A Little Girl's Xmas in Moderan	May 1971	Moderan	Coastlines	F&SF (January 1960)
A Saint George Pens a Note to His Dragons	September 1997	(uncollected)	F&SF	none
A Scare in Time	September 1968	(uncollected)	F&SF	none
A Small Miracle of Fishhooks and Straight Pins	June 1962	Bunch	Fantastic	none
A Vision of the King	September 1964	Bunch	Fantastic	none
Alien	January 1974	(uncollected)	Fantastic	none
All for Nothing	May 1964	(uncollected)	Fantastic	none
Among the Metal-and-People People	1974	New Dimensions IV	unknown	none
And So White Witch Valley	May 1971	Moderan	none	none
Animals Were So Kind	January 1956	(uncollected)	Inside #13	none
Any Heads at Home	February 1969	Bunch	Fantastic	none
At Bugs Complete	July 1974	(uncollected)	Fantastic	none
Awareness Plan	November 1962	Bunch	Fantastic	none
Battle Won	May 1971	Moderan	none	none
Breakout in Ecol 2	1973	Bunch, Nova 3	none	none
Bubble-Dome Homes	May 1971	Moderan	none	none
Control	1993	Bunch	none	none
Conversations with Women	June 1969	(uncollected)	Crawdaddy	none
December for Stronghold 9	June 1982	(uncollected)	Amazing	none
Doll for the End of the Day	October 1971	(uncollected)	Fantastic	none
Educational	May 1971	Moderan	none	none
End of a Singer	April 1975	(uncollected)	Fantastic	none
Ended	June 1962	(uncollected)	Fantastic	none
First Day, First Job, Girl	1983	Bunch	unknown	none
For Tomorrow, Daphalene	1990	(uncollected)	Pulphouse #7	none
From the Fishbowl	1984	Bunch	Last Wave #4	none
Getting Regular	August 1960	Moderan	Amazing	none
Has Anyone Seen This Horseman?	Winter 1961	Moderan	Shenandoah	none
Head Thumping the Troops	May 1971	Moderan	none	none
Helping Put The Rough Works To Jesse	1974	(uncollected)	Eternity #3	none
Holdholtzer's Box	1971	Protostars	none	none
Home to Zero	October 1964	(uncollected)	Fantastic	none
How Can a Man Be Himself	November 1954	(uncollected)	Inside #6	none
How It Ended	January 1969	Moderan	Amazing	none
How They Did The Doggie At The Curbside	March 1957	(uncollected)	Inside #17	none
How They Took Care of Soul in a Last Day for a Non-Beginning	1962	Moderan	Renaissance	none
How Xmas Ghosts are Made	1974	Alternities	none	none
I Reckon	September 1970	(uncollected)	Zane Grey's Western Magazine	none
In a Saucer Down for B-Day	April 1969	Bunch	Fantastic	none
In the Ball of Frosted Glass (With the Big Pink-Lavender Load)	March 1981	(uncollected)	Amazing Stories	none
In the Complaints Service	February 1960	Bunch	Fantastic	none
In the Empire	1961	Bunch	Shenandoah	none
In The Globe Of Changing Glass	1952	(uncollected)	Orb v3 #1	none
In the Innermost Room of Authority	May 1971	Moderan	none	none
In the Jag-Whiffling Service	February 1959	Bunch	Worlds of If	none
In the Land of the Not-Unhappies	June 1970	(uncollected)	Fantastic	none
In the Land That Aimed At Forever	May 1974	(uncollected)	Fantastic	none
In the Time of the Disposal of Infants	January 1956	Bunch	Inside #13	Amazing (March 1969)
In The Time of Peace Baskets, Phflug! Phflug!	Spring 1961	(uncollected)	Ball State University Forum	none
Incident in Moderan	1967	Moderan, Dangerous Visions	none	none
Interruption in Carnage	May 1971	Moderan	none	none
Investigating the Bidwell Endeavors	1965	Bunch	Oneota Review	none
It was in Black Cat Weather	February 1963	Moderan	Fantastic	none
Keeping It Simple	1964	Bunch	The Smith #3	none
Kicked Straight At Last	Spring 1981	(uncollected)	Pulpsmith	none
Last Zero	March 1961	(uncollected)	Fantastic	none
Learning It at Miss Rejoyy's	February 1970	(uncollected)	Fantastic Stories	none
Lecture	1968	(uncollected)	Chelsea	none
Let Me Call Her Sweetcore	December 1964	Bunch	Galaxy	none
Little Son's Party	1963	(uncollected)	Genesis West	none
Make Mine Trees	January 1965	(uncollected)	Fantastic	none
Moment of Truth in Suburb Junction	September 1973	Bunch	Fantastic	none
Mr. Who?	April 1978	(uncollected)	Fantastic	none
New Kings are Not for Laughing	May 1971	Moderan	none	none
New Member	July 1980	(uncollected)	Fantastic Science Fiction	none
New-Metal	May 1971	Moderan	none	none
New-Metal Mistress Time	May 1971	Moderan	none	none
No Cracks or Sagging	Spring 1970	Moderan	The Little Magazine	none
Of Hammers and Men	May 1971	Moderan	none	none
On the Sunniest Day of Spring	1962	Bunch	Ball State University Forum	none
One Did Not Suspect The Little Doors	June 1965	(uncollected)	Inside #13	Fantastic (June 1965) (as The Little Doors)
One False Step	May 1963	Moderan	Fantastic	none
One Time, a Red Carpet...	May 1971	Moderan	none	none
Our House	1961	Bunch	Southwest Review	none
Outside Paverts and Up to Zero Large	1952	(uncollected)	Orb v3 #2	none
Penance Day in Moderan	July 1960	Moderan	Amazing	none
Playmate	May 1965	Moderan	Fantastic	none
Please Help! Save Our Bugs and Pile Our Birds	1981	Bunch	Story Quarterly	none
Preparation	1991	(uncollected)	Pulphouse #11	none
Price of Leisure	May 1971	(uncollected)	Galaxy	none
Pridey Goeth	October 1978	(uncollected)	Fantastic Stories	none
Remembering	April 1960	Moderan	Amazing	none
Report from the Colony	Fall 1973	(uncollected)	Edge	none
Reunion	February 1965	Moderan	Amazing	none
Riders of Thunder	1960	Bunch	San Francisco Review	none
Routine Emergency	December 1957	Bunch	Worlds of If	none
Seeing Stingy Ed	June 1973	(uncollected)	Haunt of Horror	none
Send Us A Planet!	July 1978	(uncollected)	Fantastic Stories	none
Short Time at the Pearly Gates	March 1974	(uncollected)	Fantastic	none
Somebody Up There Hates Us	1963	Bunch	Amazing	none
Sometimes I Get So Happy	August 1963	Moderan	Fantastic	none
Stilled Are The Guns	March–April 1971	(uncollected)	Zane Grey's Western Magazine	none
Strange Shape in the Stronghold	March 1960	Moderan	Fantastic	none
Survival Packages	April 1963	Moderan	Fantastic	none
Taking Leave	November 1968	(uncollected)	The Smith #10	none
Thanks! Anyway	January 1956	(uncollected)	Inside #13	none
That High-up Blue Day that Saw the Back Sky-Train Come Spinning	March 1968	Bunch	F&SF	none
The Bird Man of Moderan	May 1971	Moderan	none	none
The Butterflies Were Eagle-Big That Day	May 1971	Moderan	none	none
The College of Acceptable Death	July 1964	Bunch	Fantastic	none
The Dirty War	1977	Future Pastimes	Eternity #2	none
The Escaping	1967	Dangerous Visons (Harlan Ellison)	none	none
The Fable of the Moonshooter and the Indifferent Undergraduate	October 1967	(uncollected)	Dare	none
The Failure	August 1964	(uncollected)	Fantastic	none
The Final Decision	February 1961	Moderan	Amazing	none
The Flesh-Man from Far Wide	November 1959	Moderan	Amazing	none
The Good War	December 1972	(uncollected)	Fantastic	none
The Hall of CD	June 1963	(uncollected)	Fantastic Stories of Imagination	none
The Joke	August 1971	(uncollected)	Fantastic	none
The Lady was for Kroinking	1977	Generation, Future Pastimes	none	none
The Mad Man from Machinery Row	Fall 1953	(uncollected)	Fantastic Worlds #5	none
The Man Who Licked The Condition	1953	(uncollected)	New Mexico Quarterly #23	none
The Man who Prepared for No Thinking	1959	(uncollected)	Coastlines	none
The Miracle of the Flowers	October 1966	Moderan	The Smith	none
The Monsters	November 1968	(uncollected)	Amazing	none
The One from Camelot Moderan	Winter 1962	Moderan	Descant	none
The Pink Umbrella	1951	(uncollected)	The Nekromantikon #5	none
The Problem	May 1971	Moderan	none	none
The Problem was Lubrication	January 1956	(uncollected)	Inside #13	Fantastic (January 1956)
The Reluctant Immortals	November 1962	(uncollected)	If	none
The Soul Shortchangers	Winter 1993	(uncollected)	Crank #2	none
The Strange Case of the Birds	December 1975	(uncollected)	Fantastic	none
The Strange Rider of the Good Year	November 1980	(uncollected)	Amazing Stories	none
The Stronghold	May 1971	Moderan	none	none
The Survey Trip	May 1962	Bunch	Fantastic	none
The Time Battler	1992	(uncollected)	Strange Plasma #5	none
The Time Saviour	1961	Bunch	New Frontiers	none
The Walking, Talking I-Don't-Care Man	June 1965	Moderan	Amazing	none
The Warning	November 1960	Moderan	Amazing	none
They Never Came Back from WHOOSH	February 1964	Bunch	Fantastic	none
Thinking Back (Our God is a Helpful God!)	May 1971	Moderan	none	none
This From-Far-Up-There Missile Worry	Autumn 1994	(uncollected)	Crank #4	none
Through a Wall and Back	1979	(uncollected)	Eternity #1	none
Through Crisis with the Gonedaidins	Summer 1953	(uncollected)	Fantastic Worlds #4	none
To Face Eternity	May 1971	Moderan	none	none
Tough Rocks and Hard Stones	September 1970	(uncollected)	F&SF	none
Training Talk	March 1964	Bunch	Fantastic	none
Training Talk No. 12	January 1972	Bunch, Christmas Magic	F&SF	none
Two Pessimists and a Pigeon	April 1968	(uncollected)	Aspects	none
Two Suns for the King	March/April 1972	(uncollected)	Worlds of If	none
Unwarranted Departure	1972	Bunch	The Smith	none
Up to the Edge of Heaven	April 1972	Bunch	Fantastic	none
Warning #1	January 1956	(uncollected)	Inside #13	none
Was She Horrid?	December 1959	Moderan	Fantastic	none
We Hardly Ever Waked Phene	1972	(uncollected)	unknown	Pulphouse #9
We Regret...	February 1961	(uncollected)	Fantastic	none
When The Metal Eaters Came	June–July 1979	(uncollected)	Galaxy	none
Will-Hung and Waiting	May 1971	Moderan	none	none
Writer's Workshop Stories	September 1982	(uncollected)	Amazing/Fantastic	none
Yet Another View of Hell	1972	(uncollected)	Weirdbook #5	none
