= Swanee River (band) =

Northern Irish blues rock band

- Origin: Derry, Northern Ireland
- Genres: Hard rock, blues rock, Southern rock
- Years active: 2004–present
- Label: Rocksector Records
- Members: Steven Horner; Graham Baldrick; Michael McCafferty; Fionnbharr Ó HÁgain
- Website: Official Website

Swanee River is a blues rock band from Northern Ireland. Swanee River was formed in 2004. Their musical style is a mixture of rock, soul, funk and metal.

== History ==
To date Swanee River has released three EPs and completed countless gigs and tours throughout Ireland and the United Kingdom.

In 2008, they supported Irish rock bands such as Taste on a string of dates. In 2009 they were asked back to support Taste on a Northern Irish tour. In 2009 they also supported UFO in Belfast, a UK support tour with The Answer and served as main support to the Answer again on their homecoming gig in The Ulster Hall to a sold-out audience of 1700 people.

From 2009 onwards, the band frequently featured in such publications as Classic Rock magazine (UK and US) where they had songs featured on the free cover mount CD of 75,000 copies and the US cover mount CD which sells in the region of 40,000 copies each month. They were also featured in Hotpress (also included on the cover mount CD), Derry Journal, Dublin Evening Herald, Mid Ulster Mail, and Alternative Ulster.

In radio and television the band have been featured on such broadcasts as BBC ATL TV, BBC Radio 1 Introducing, Electric Mainline (BBC), The Mark Patterson Show (BBC), Drive 105, Balcony TV, Maiden City FM, Rte Radio 2 and Downtown radio.

In 2010, Swanee River has been mainly writing and recording their debut album which is due for release in early 2011, however the band still managed to squeeze in a string of headline shows around the country and played a total of eight festivals from the summer onwards including Glasgowbury, Sunflowerfest, Macfest, Pigstock, Gasyard Feila 'wan big weekend', August Mini Mayhem (Belfast, Swanee headline), Beers for Speirs (Kelly's Portrush) and Winterfest, Ahoghil.

2011 has seen Swanee River release their debut album, Smoking Jacket, write and record the sound track for Irish Film Board film The Birth of Rock, secure a headline slot for the biggest Indian college rock festival 'Synchronicity' in October at IIT KANPUR, featured in local and national press and publications, secure main support slot on seven dates across Ireland with The Answer and eight Northern Ireland festival appearances, including a couple as headliners.

== Band members ==
- Steven Horner (Vocals)
- Graham Baldrick (Guitar)
- Michael McCafferty (Bass)
- Fionnbharr Ó HÁgain (Drums)

== Discography ==
=== Albums ===
- Smoking Jacket (7 May 2011)

=== EPs ===
- Back to the Handlebars EP
- Baby Better Lady EP
- Kick Off yer Cloggs EP
