= Atomic Garden (band) =

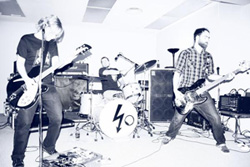

Background information
- Origin: France
- Genres: Indie rock
- Years active: 2000–present
- Label: Dumb inc. records
- Members: Arnaud Mailler; Rauf Jordan; Lawrence Arnold; Paul Mcdonald
- Website: atomicgarden.co.uk

Atomic Garden are an indie rock band from France. Formed in 2000, the band have had several line ups: they currently comprise Arnaud Mailler (guitar/vocals), Rauf Jordan (bass/vocals) Paul Mcdonald(guitar)and Lawrence Arnold (drums). Their sound is a mix of rock with punk rock and post-hardcore influences.

They have released four albums: Hellheaven (2004), Reversing the Curse (2006) Little Stories about Potential Events (2009) and "Arco Iris" (2011 on their own label, Dumb inc. Records. They have also contributed songs to other albums, including splits with Ipanema in the UK and G.a.s. Drummers in Spain.

The band have toured several times and played in France, England (with Helsinki Seven), Scotland, Wales, Spain, Switzerland, Germany and the United States.

== Discography ==
- 2003 split with Me Myself and I (CD)
- 2004 Radio Activity (CD)
- 2004 Hellheaven (CD)
- 2005 split with Aside, G.a.s. Drummers and Ravi (7")
- 2005 split with Clumsy, Powell and Down to Earth (CD)
- 2006 Reversing the Curse (CD / LP / digital)
- 2007 split with Ipanema (CD / 7")
- 2009 Little Stories about Potential Events (CD / 2xLPs / digital)
- 2011 "Arco Iris" (CD / LP / digital)
