= The Jepettos =

Alternative folk band from Northern Ireland

- Origin: Belfast and Derry, Northern Ireland
- Genres: Alternative folk
- Years active: 2011–present
- Labels: Unsigned
- Members: Michael Aicken; Ruth Aicken; Emma Flanagan; Colm Hinds; Daniel Kerr; Michael Andrews; Jonny Ashe; Laura-Jane Hughes; Sarah Williamson; Scott Jamison

The Jepettos are an alternative folk band from Belfast and Derry, Northern Ireland. The band was formed in February 2011 and consists of writer members Michael Aicken (vocals, guitars) and Ruth Aicken (vocals, various instruments) alongside an alternating line-up of musicians. Highlights in the band's career have included supporting rapper Tinie Tempah and sharing the bill with Foo Fighters and The Black Keys at Tennent's Vital in 2012.

== History ==
After performing together with Northern Ireland folk act The Lowly Knights, Michael and Ruth Aicken initially formed The Jepettos with Derry trio Emma Flanagan (clarinet, glockenspiel), Colm Hinds (bass) and Daniel Kerr (drums, glockenspiel). Since formation the group has also variously contained additional musicians Michael Andrews (bass), Scott Jamison (drums, glockenspiel), Jonny Ashe (electric guitar), Laura-Jane Hughes (trumpet) and Sarah Williamson (oboe). The band is named after Geppetto, the father of fictional character Pinocchio.

The group released their debut EP Start a New People in January 2012. Single "Goldrush" was released initially as a free download, and featured Duke Special on piano. The single garnered positive reviews from Hot Press magazine and the Daily Mirror, and a music video, directed by Marty Stalker, was produced to accompany the release.

The Jepettos made a number of showcase performances during the summer and autumn of 2012. They performed in July at Glasgowbury Festival, and then in August the band was selected to play the new second stage at the annual Tennent's Vital festival, sharing the bill with The Black Keys and Foo Fighters. At Arthur's Day 2012 the group supported English rapper Tinie Tempah live in Belfast.

In 2013 The Jepettos released "Water", a single featuring cellist and singer Alana Henderson. Henderson has since joined the backing group for Irish singer-songwriter Hozier, performing across the world and on national US television. The song was chosen as BBC Radio 1 DJ Huw Stephens' "Introducing Discovery" in September 2013.

== Discography ==
The Jepettos discography
- EPs: 3
- Singles: 7
- Music videos: 7

=== Extended plays ===
Year	EP details	Peak chart positions
Year	EP details	UK
2012	Start a New People: Released: 6 January 2012; Label: N/A; Format: CD, Download	—
2013	Troubles: Released: 15 December 2013; Label: N/A; Format: CD, Download	—
2014	Closer: Released: 1 November 2014; Label: N/A; Format: Download	—

=== Singles ===
Year	Title	Chart Positions			Album
Year	Title	UK	IRL	UK Indie	Album
2012	"Goldrush"	—	—	—	Start a New People
2013	"Chemicals"	—	—	—	Troubles
2013	"Water" (featuring Alana Henderson and Scott Jamison)	—	—	—	Troubles
2014	"Even Though"	—	—	—	Troubles
2014	"What You Said"	—	—	—	—
2014	"Orchard" (featuring Tabitha Agnew)	—	—	—	—
2015	"Møving Ūndergrøūnd" (with Cup O' Joe)	—	—	—	—
"—" denotes that a title did not chart.

=== Music videos ===
Year	Title	Director
2012	"Goldrush"	Marty Stalker
2013	"Chemicals"	Darren Lee
2013	"Water" (featuring Alana Henderson and Scott Jamison)	Matt Rutherfoord-Jones and Paul Elliot
2014	"What You Said"	Matt Rutherfoord-Jones and Paul Elliot
2014	"Even Though"	Wolfhound Media
2014	"Orchard" (featuring Tabitha Agnew)	Matt Rutherfoord-Jones and Paul Elliot
2015	"Møving Ūndergrøūnd"	Jørn Ranum and Inge Wegge ed. Paul Elliot
