= Smalltown America Records =

Smalltown America
- Status: Defunct
- Genre: Various
- Country of origin: UK
- Location: Derry, Northern Ireland
- Official website: www.smalltownamerica.co.uk

Smalltown America (STA) was a UK-based independent record label formed in 2001. Staff are currently based in London and Derry, and the label has a stated aim of "cultivating a productive staff of music lovers and a self-sustainable business model, through which artists can release the best records they can possibly produce."

Originally set up by Jetplane Landing as the platform for their releases, the label released numerous albums by other acts, as well as nine Public Service Broadcast compilation CDs.

The closure of the label was announced by founder Andrew Ferris on 24 November 2020.

== Roster ==
=== Former ===
- Alan MX
- Axis Of
- Blacklisters
- Burning Alms
- Feldberg
- Illness
- Jetplane Landing
- LaFaro
- More Than Conquerors
- Skibunny
- Sullivan & Gold
- The Light Sleepers
- The Young Playthings
- This Town Needs Guns
- We Versus the Shark
- And So I Watch You From Afar
- Oppenheimer
- Fickle Public
- Fighting With Wire
- An Emergency
- USA Nails

As well as this, around 150 artists saw their music released on the Public Service Broadcast compilation CD series and showcased on the offshoot Public Service Blogcast weekly audioblog.

== See also ==
- List of record labels
- List of independent UK record labels
