= Axis Of =

Musical group from Northern Ireland

- Origin: Portstewart, Northern Ireland
- Genres: Alternative rock, punk rock, hardcore punk
- Years active: 2007–2016, 2022–present
- Label: Smalltown America
- Members: Niall Lawlor; Ewen Friers
- Past members: Ethan Harman; Gybb Harrison
- Website: Facebook

Axis Of are a three-piece alternative rock band from Portstewart, Northern Ireland. The band is composed of Niall Lawlor (guitar, vocals) and Ewen Friers (bass, vocals).

== History ==
Axis Of formed in 2007, and after various line up changes they released their debut single "Brobdingnagian" in late 2009, launching in Belfast in January 2010. Since early 2010 the band have enjoyed a rise in popularity, partly due to the release of their second single "Port Na Spaniagh", which was released along with a music video, available on YouTube.

Following one of the band's UK tours in early 2010, Rock Sound magazine dubbed them "the most exciting band to come out of Northern Ireland, possibly ever" and gave them a 9/10 rating for their live performance at a show in Newcastle. As a result of this coverage the band were subsequently asked to take part in a Maida Vale Studios session in January 2011.

On 10 October 2012 they announced that they signed with Derry based label Smalltown America Records. Their début album was released in Autumn 2012 and titled Finding St Kilda.

== Touring ==
Axis Of have supported Therapy?, The King Blues, Deaf Havana, Twin Atlantic, The Joy Formidable, Lower Than Atlantis, The Bronx and frnkiero andthe cellabration.

== Members ==
- Niall Lawlor – Guitar, vocals
- Ewen Friers – Bass, vocals

=== Former members ===
- Ethan Harman – Drums, percussion, vocals (2010–2015)
- Gybb Harrison – Drums, percussion(2007–2010)

=== Touring musicians ===
- Andrew Coles – drums (2013–present)

== Discography ==
Axis Of discography
- Studio albums: 2
- Singles: 6
- Music videos: 4

=== Studio albums ===
Year	Album details	Peak chart positions	
Year	Album details	IRL	UK
2013	Finding St Kilda: Released: 15 March 2013; Label: Smalltown America; Formats: CD, Download	—	—
2015	The Mid Brae Inn: Released: 23 February 2015; Label: Smalltown America; Formats: CD, Download	—	—
2022	Bella Pacifica: Released: 2022; Label: Smalltown America; Formats: CD, Download	—	—
"—" denotes a title that did not chart.

=== Singles ===
Year	Title	Peak chart positions		Album
Year	Title	IRL	UK	Album
2009	"Brobdingnagian"	—	—	
2010	"Port Na Spaniagh"	—	—	
2013	"Lifehammer"	—	—	Finding St Kilda
2014	"Wetsuit"	—	—	The Mid Brae Inn
2015	"The Harsh Winds Of Rathlin"	—	—	The Mid Brae Inn
2022	"Beach Light"	—	—	Bella Pacifica
"—" denotes a title that did not chart.
