= Fighting with Wire =

Northern Irish rock/punk band

- Origin: Derry, Northern Ireland
- Genres: Alternative Rock; Rock; Punk
- Years active: 2003 – 2013
- Labels: Smalltown America (2004-2012); Atlantic Records (2008-2012); Xtra Mile Recordings (2012-2013)
- Past members: Cahir O'Doherty; Craig McKean; Jamie King
- Website: fightingwithwire.co.uk

Fighting with Wire (or FWW) were an alternative heavy rock and punk band hailing from Derry, Northern Ireland. They have toured with Biffy Clyro, Million Dead, Reuben, Twin Atlantic, yourcodenameis:milo, Kerbdog, Helmet, You Me At Six, Nomeansno, InMe, Brigade, Against Me!, Seafood, and Coheed and Cambria. They have also played at the Glasgowbury Festival and Belsonic.

== History ==
Formed in late 2003, the band has gone through considerable changes, notably going through 5 different bassists. The band is influenced by such bands as At the Drive-In, Nirvana, Weezer and Fugazi. Machine Parts was their first single and a video was made for its promotion. Fighting with Wire have appeared on numerous Public Service Broadcast editions from Smalltown America. They are considered by many locals as a healthy influence on Derry's music scene and have, on numerous occasions agreed to help out with youth projects. They work in close collaboration with the Nerve Centre, band members Cahir and Jamie mentored over 30 teenagers at the Music Hothouse. The band also maintain a strong link with other Derry bands, including Triggerman and Red Organ Serpent Sound. They launched their album "Man vs Monster" on 1 December 2007 at the Nerve Centre in Derry and subsequently toured the United Kingdom and Ireland. The band have also appeared on stage at Glasgowbury on numerous occasions.

=== 2008 ===
Having toured extensively and released their first album with Smalltown America, Fighting With Wire gained international recognition through not only national radio station, BBC Radio One, but also online with Shadowglobe an online Radio project founded by UK programming guru Andy Ashton (Xfm) which as a result led the band to signing a deal with Atlantic Records. Fighting with Wire also played a number of festivals including Reading and Leeds, Oxegen, T in the Park, BBC Radio One Big Weekend, Download Festival at Donington Park. They played at Belfast City Hall on New Year's Eve with Supergrass and The Pigeon Detectives

At a 2008 concert in Spring and Airbrake, Belfast, they stated that if you get anything from this concert, it will be that we are the 'whoohoo' band. This is a reference to the song Cut the Transmission. A show at the Camden Barfly, London, on 9 February 2009, almost ended halfway through due to the over-enthusiastic crowd pushing forward on to the stage, repeatedly knocking O'Doherty's microphone stand over and bashing him in the face. The band played Sonisphere with Metallica and Linkin Park among others.

=== 2009-2013 ===
FWW were confirmed by Stephen McAuley on Rory McConnell's BBC Radio One Introducing Show at midnight on Wednesday 26 May to headline the Glasgowbury Festival on the anniversary of its 10th year on 24 July 2010. They played at Belsonic in Belfast on 28 August 2010 alongside Twin Atlantic, Lostprophets, and Biffy Clyro . FWW released an EP on 11/01/10 called 'I Am Ursus' due to the frustration of not being able to release their second album. FWW announced that they would be supporting Helmet in early 2012. FWW recorded their second album under the working title of "Bones Of The Twilight" at Dark Horse Studios and Blackbird Studios in Nashville with producer Nick Raskulinecz. The album's release date was uncertain and for two years it still had not been given a release date. In March 2012, the band announced they had departed from Atlantic Records due to the label's failure to release their album for over 2 years. The first single from their new album, 'Colonel Blood', was played on Across The Line on 12 March 2012. On 4 March 2012, the band announced on their Facebook page that the single would be released on 2 May and the album, of the same name, will be released for free download independently without their record labels. 2 months after the announcement the band then made public they had signed a deal with Xtra Mile Recordings and that the album would now instead be released through them. On 28 February 2013, the band announced via their Facebook page that they were to split at the end of the year after a final show in Derry City on 28 September.

== Discography ==
Fighting With Wire discography
- Studio albums: 2
- Extended plays: 4
- Singles: 6

=== Studio albums ===
Year	Album details	Peak chart positions	
Year	Album details	IRL	UK
2008	Man vs Monster: Released: 2008; Label: Smalltown America; Formats: CD, Download	—	—
2012	Colonel Blood: Released: 21 September 2012; Label: Xtra Mile; Formats: CD, Download	—	—
"—" denotes a title that did not chart.

=== EPs ===
Year	Album details
2004	EP1: Released: 2004
2005	EP2: Released: 2005
2008	Fighting with Wire: Released: 2008
2010	I Am Ursus: Released: 2010

=== Singles ===
Year	Title	Peak chart positions		Album
Year	Title	IRL	UK	Album
2005	"Machine Parts"	—	—	non-album single
2008	"Everyone Needs a Nemesis"	—	—	Man vs Monster
2008	"All for Nothing"	—	—	Man vs Monster
2009	"Sugar"	—	—	Man vs Monster
2012	"Waiting On A Way to Believe"	—	—	Colonel Blood
2012	"Didn't Wanna Come Back Home"	—	—	Colonel Blood
"—" denotes a title that did not chart.

=== Compilation appearances ===
- Various Artists - Public Service Broadcast No. 3 (2004)
- Various Artists - Public Service Broadcast No. 4 (2004)
- Various Artists - Public Service Broadcast No. 6 (2005)
- Various Artistis - Kerrang! The Album '08 (2008)
