= And So I Watch You from Afar =

Northern Irish band

- ASIWYFA

Background information
- Origin: Belfast, Northern Ireland, UK
- Genres: Post-rock; experimental rock; progressive rock; math rock; art rock
- Years active: 2005–present
- Labels: Smalltown America, Richter Collective, Sargent House, Big Scary Monsters. Equal Vision, Velocity
- Members: Rory Friers; Niall Kennedy; Ewen Friers; Chris Wee
- Past members: Tony Wright; Johnny Adger
- Website: asiwyfa.com

And So I Watch You from Afar is a Northern Irish instrumental rock band from Belfast, composed of guitarists Rory Friers and Niall Kennedy, bassist Ewen Friers and drummer Chris Wee.

The band released two albums with former member Tony Wright, who was replaced by Niall Kennedy in 2011. The band signed with Richter Collective, and in October 2011 announced a deal in North America with management and record label Sargent House.

They released their self-titled debut studio album on 13 April 2009. Their second studio album, Gangs (2011), was met with favourable reviews. The band released their third studio album, All Hail Bright Futures, on 15 March 2013 on Sargent House. Their fourth studio album, Heirs, was released in 2015. Their fifth studio album, The Endless Shimmering, was released on 20 October 2017. On 18 February 2022, the band released their sixth album, Jettison, an ambitious "multimedia long form ensemble piece" with spoken word features throughout from Emma Ruth Rundle and Neil Fallon. The band released their seventh studio album, Megafauna on 9 August 2024.

== Discography ==
=== Studio albums ===
List of studio albums, with selected details and peak chart positions
Title	Album details	Peak chart positions	
Title	Album details	IRL	UK
And So I Watch You from Afar	Released: April 13, 2009; Label: Smalltown America; Formats: CD, download, LP	—	—
Gangs	Released: 29 April 2011; Label: Richter Collective; Formats: CD, download, LP	28	—
All Hail Bright Futures	Released: 15 March 2013; Label: Sargent House; Formats: CD, download, LP	81	—
Heirs	Released: 4 May 2015; Label: Sargent House; Formats: CD, download, LP	97	—
The Endless Shimmering	Released: 20 October 2017; Label: Sargent House; Formats: CD, download, LP	—	—
Jettison	Released: 18 February 2022; Label: Equal Vision, Velocity; Formats: CD, download, LP	—	—
Megafauna	Released: 9 August 2024; Label: Velocity; Formats: CD, download, LP	—	—
"—" denotes a title that did not chart.

=== Singles ===
List of singles
Year	Title	Album
"Set Guitars to Kill"	2009	And So I Watch You from Afar
"S Is for Salamander"	2009	The Letters (EP)
"Straight Through the Sun Without a Scratch"	2010	Non-album single
"Search:Party:Animal"	2011	Gangs
"BeautifulUniverseMasterChampion"	2011	Gangs

== Band members ==
Current

- Rory Friers – guitar (2005–present)
- Chris Wee – drums, percussion (2005–present)
- Niall Kennedy – guitar (2011–present; touring member 2011–2013)
- Ewen Friers – bass (c. 2023–present)

Former

- Tony Wright – guitar (2005–2011)
- Johnny Adger – bass (2005–c. 2023)
