= 2008 in Irish music =

This is a summary of the year 2008 in the Irish music industry.

== Summary ==
=== January ===
- On Wednesday January 9 the nominations for Irish Album of the Year 2007 were announced. The winner received the Choice Music Prize on Wednesday February 27.
- On January 11–12, Cathy Davey, Republic of Loose, Si Schroeder and Halves will be amongst the acts representing Ireland at the Eurosonic Festival in Groningen in the Netherlands.
- On Saturday January 19 Primordial recorded their performance at The Button Factory (formerly Temple Bar Music Centre) for inclusion in a possible concert DVD
- On Tuesday January 22 it was announced that the low budget Irish movie Once had been nominated in the Best Original Song category at this year's Oscars. The song nominated was "Falling Slowly", written by the film's stars Markéta Irglová and Glen Hansard. On January 28, doubt was expressed as to the song's eligibility for the award but the matter was later resolved.
- On January 27, Dolores O'Riordan received an EBBA Award in Cannes for her debut solo album, Are You Listening?.

=== February ===
- On Monday February 4, tickets for Eric Clapton's performance at Malahide Castle in June went on sale at €76.25.
- On Tuesday February 5 at 9 a.m. tickets for The Kooks and Radio Soulwax performances at the Heineken Green Energy festival at Dublin Castle in May went on sale.
- On Saturday February 9, whilst playing a free gig in Dublin, Frank Black was bundled away in a squad car. He had planned to play a short set at the bandstand on St Stephen's Green before his Vicar Street headliner but instead was bundled into a Garda car and whisked away.
- Smashing Pumpkins returned to Ireland for the first time since their 2007 reformation. On Saturday February 9, they played the RDS Simmonscourt in Dublin and on Sunday February 10, they played the King's Hall in Belfast. They were supported on both occasions by Concerto For Constantine.
- Also on Sunday February 10 the 50th Grammy Awards took place at the Staples Center in Los Angeles, California in the United States. Glen Hansard and Markéta Irglová, his co-star in Once, were up for two nominations; "Best Compilation Soundtrack Album" and "Best Song Written for Motion Picture, Television or Other Visual Media" for the track "Falling Slowly" from Once. However they won neither.
- On Friday February 15, R.E.M. were confirmed to headline Oxegen 2008, the second act to be announced following Kings of Leon in November 2007.
- Also on Friday February 15, The Chalets announced their split via blog on their MySpace, whilst Hooray For Humans announced they had parted company with lead singer, Aine Mangaoang. February 29 saw Hooray for Humans's new members Jen and Matt being confirmed via a MySpace post, although this didn't prevent a cancellation of a series of Irish appearances (apart from a March 13 appearance in Dolan's of Limerick) as their new lineup got up to speed.
- Later on Friday February 15, the 2008 Meteor Awards took place in the RDS Simmonscourt. Duke Special won the Best Irish Male award and Cathy Davey won the Best Irish Female award. Aslan won Best Irish Band and Paddy Casey's Addicted to Company won Best Irish Album. Other winners included Ham Sandwich, The Blizzards, Damien Dempsey, Mundy and Sharon Shannon, Westlife and Ray Foley.
- On February 19, Kaiser Chiefs, The Raconteurs and Ian Brown were officially announced for Oxegen 2008. This announcement was followed by three more on the following days; The Fratellis, Interpol and Counting Crows (February 20), Hot Chip, Justice, The Chemical Brothers, Aphex Twin and Alabama 3 (February 21), and Sunday night headliners Rage Against the Machine (February 22). Also announced for Oxegen in late February were The Verve (February 24), Stereophonics, Seasick Steve, The Courteeners and Future Kings of Spain (February 25) as well as The Prodigy, The Feeling and Panic! at the Disco (February 26).
- On February 22, U2 released their much-anticipated 3D concert film, U2 3D. The film was the first digital 3D, multi-camera, real-time production, with nine digital 3D cameras being used to capture over 100 hours of 3D footage. Directed by Catherine Owens and Mark Pellington, the film was shot in Buenos Aires during the South American leg of the band's Vertigo Tour in 2006.
- On February 24, the 80th Academy Awards took place in the Kodak Theatre in Hollywood, California, with "Falling Slowly", from the low budget Irish movie Once and written by Markéta Irglová and Glen Hansard, winning the Academy Award for Best Original Song. The song was performed by the duo on the night.
- The Choice Music Prize for Irish Album of the Year 2007 was awarded at Vicar Street to Super Extra Bonus Party for their album Super Extra Bonus Party LP on Wednesday February 27.

=== March ===
- On Monday March 3, Editors, The Hoosiers, Lightspeed Champion, Róisín Murphy, Battles, Richard Hawley, Kate Nash, Scouting for Girls, The Zutons, Newton Faulkner, Pendulum and Bowling for Soup were announced for Oxegen 2008.
- On Wednesday March 5 at 8 a.m., tickets went on sale for Prince's performance at Croke Park on June 16, priced at €66.50.
- On Thursday March 6, the first issue of State appeared on Irish shelves. By October it was being given away for free.
- Also on Thursday March 6, Oxegen 2008 was officially launched with official confirmation of appearances by Amy Winehouse, The Pogues, The Charlatans and The Swell Season, featuring Oscar winners Glen Hansard and Markéta Irglová. A breakdown of the acts was also revealed for the first time. This was in preparation for Friday March 7, when tickets for the festival went on general sale at 8 a.m.
- On Monday March 10 at 9 a.m., tickets for Neil Young's Malahide Castle show on Sunday June 29 and his performance at the Marquee in Cork on June 30, priced at €81.25 standing, went on sale.
- On Wednesday March 12 at 9 a.m., tickets for Lou Reed's performance at the Marquee in Cork on Monday June 23 went on sale, priced between €54.80 and €65.70.
- On March 12, a new website offered free festival tickets in exchange for sperm donations.
- On Thursday March 13, there was "uproar" and "bewilderment" as it was revealed that R.E.M.'s new album Accelerate would be accepted as "Irish music" by the Broadcasting Commission of Ireland. As the album was recorded in Grouse Lodge Studios in County Westmeath it qualifies as "Irish". BCI chief executive Michael O'Keeffe confirmed this was to be the case. "It's supporting the Irish music industry," he said. Kylie Minogue, who recorded a number of tracks for her album Fever in Dublin's Windmill Lane Studios, including the title track and the hit single "Love at First Sight", would also be considered "Irish". Irish musicians openly condemned the position. Steve Wall said that it was "the first time I heard that". "It sounds ridiculous. Shame on them", was the view of Concerto For Constantine bassist, Gavin Fox, calling it "just another excuse for stations not to get behind Irish music". Kíla's Colm Ó Snodaigh referred to how "we used to have Def Leppard and Lisa Stansfield living here as tax exiles, does that mean they'd count as Irish too?" and stating that R.E.M. "certainly don't need the extra airplay". Julie Feeney called for "a bit of imagination and persistence from a DJ who's willing to take the jump and play Irish artists." Louis Walsh called it "crazy" and criticised Irish stations constantly playing United States acts such as Timbaland, Nelly Furtado, Justin Timberlake, Rihanna, making the point that Snow Patrol's success came largely out of their music appearing on a US TV show and emphasising the difficulties faced by potential future U2s. Music directors at local radio stations Red FM (Cork) and Phantom 105.2 (Dublin) said that they would not include international artists who had recorded in Ireland as part of their required "Irish music" output.
- On Friday March 14, the Apple iPhone was launched in Ireland, available on the O_{2} network only. Churchtown student Philip Cosgrave (21), was the first person in the country to purchase the phone. The iPhone was made available in eight and 16GB models, but these were criticised for their price, retailing in Ireland for €399 and €499 respectively.
- Also on Friday March 14, tickets for Leonard Cohen's June 14 and 15 dates at the Royal Hospital, Kilmainham went on sale, priced from €88.50 to €115. The shows were Cohen's first Irish dates in twenty years. Tickets for a third date (June 13) went on sale on Wednesday March 26 at 9 a.m.
- On Sunday March 16 at approximately 01:15, the Dublin nightclub and music venue, The Village on Wexford Street caught fire. Over 800 people inside at the time were evacuated safely within seven minutes. The fire affected mainly the front of the premises and the damage to the building was not extensive. The fire was blamed on an electrical fault. Meanwhile, Bell X1's tour bus caught fire outside the hotel where they were staying in Medford, Massachusetts. Paul Noonan and David Geraghty were on board the vehicle at the time and raised the alarm after smelling smoke. Fire fighters were called to the scene shortly after 3.30 a.m. and took 90 minutes to put out the blaze, which started in the bus' ventilation/air-conditioning unit and caused an estimated $50,000 worth of damage. On Saint Patrick's Day they appeared on the Late Show with David Letterman, a move that led to their Chicago show selling out.
- On Wednesday March 26 at 6 p.m., the line-up for Electric Picnic 2008 was announced.
- On Thursday March 27, promoters MCD revealed to the Herald that The Killers would be playing Marlay Park in August, adding that tickets for the event would go on sale on April 4 at 8 a.m.
- On Friday March 28 at 9 p.m., tickets for Electric Picnic 2008 went on sale. Weekend tickets – there were no individual day ones – cost €240 including camping, with the various sites opening at 9 a.m. on Friday August 29. Camper van access cost €60.

=== April ===
- On Friday April 4, tickets for The Killers and Bloc Party at Marlay Park on August 21 went on sale, whilst at 9 a.m. tickets for Paul Simon's July 3 show at the Marquee in Cork also went on sale.
- On Saturday April 12, Bud Rising Street Party took place outdoors at George's Dock on Custom House Quay in Dublin, with Mix Master Mike, DJ Morgan and live graffiti man Maser as well as headliners, The Streets.
- On Tuesday April 15, Down played the Ambassador.
- On Friday April 18, tickets for Metallica and Tenacious D's August 20 date at Marlay Park went on sale, priced at €74.50.
- On Saturday April 19 at 9 a.m., tickets for Muse and Kasabian at Marlay Park on August 13 went on sale, priced at €69.50.
- On Friday April 25, tickets for the August 19 appearance of Lenny Kravitz, Alanis Morissette and OneRepublic at Marlay Park went on sale.

=== May ===
- Heineken Green Energy took place at Dublin Castle from Saturday May 3 until Monday May 5, marking the beginning of the festival season in Ireland. Nick Cave and the Bad Seeds opened the 2008 event with a sold-out show on May 3, supported by David Graney; Radio Soulwax and 2manydjs headlined on Sunday May 4, with Riton DJ Set and Das Pop; The Kooks headlined on Monday May 5, supported by The Coronas. All support acts began at 6 p.m. with headliners taking to the stage at 9 p.m. Phantom FM transformed Thomas Reads on Parliament Street into the Heineken Green Energy Festival HQ for the weekend. Win tickets
- On Wednesday May 7, it was announced that all tickets for Oxegen 2008 had sold out, as 40 new acts joined the bill. These included Manic Street Preachers, The Kooks, The Stranglers, Feeder, Echo & the Bunnymen, Bell X1, Groove Armada, Vampire Weekend, The Ting Tings, Black Kids, MGMT, The Coronas, Concerto For Constantine and Delorentos.
- On Tuesday May 13, illness put paid to two gigs due to take place in Dublin that night. The Pigeon Detectives cancelled their Academy show after frontman Matt Bowman suffered a serious leg injury during the band's set at Radio 1's Big Weekend in Kent, after which he was brought to hospital where it was initially feared he might need emergency surgery. Their performance in Belfast's Mandela Hall on May 14 was also affected by the injury. However, on Friday May 16, it was announced that they would be appearing at Oxegen alongside The National, The Go! Team, The Enemy, Tricky and One Night Only. On June 3, The Pigeon Detectives announced rescheduled dates in Dublin's Academy on July 22 and Belfast's Mandela Hall on July 23. Meanwhile, Canadian group, Black Mountain also cancelled their gig in the Button Factory on the same night due to an unspecified illness. On May 14, Skinny Wolves Club gig was cancelled "due to a mess up with EX MODELS flights, leaving them stranded in London, unable to fly to Dublin for the gig." On May 19, Animal Collective cancelled their Tripod show due to missing a ferry, "the third no show in a week" as dramatically (and inaccurately) described by Hot Press. Arch-rivals State bit back with news that a new show, with support from Atlas Sound, had been put together on the same date at Whelan's, causing uproar amongst fans who had been let down by Hot Press and Phantom news bulletins.
- On Friday May 16, another 2fm reschedule was announced, with Dave Fanning returning to his midnight slot (where he started) on Sundays, a new slot for Jenny Huston's The Annex 7 p.m. on Sundays and the arrival of brand new dance programme, Electric Disco to be broadcast at 6 p.m. on Saturday evenings and presented by 2fm's newest DJ, Jenny Green.
- On Sunday May 18, Alison Curtis's 8 p.m. The Last Splash indie show on Today FM celebrated its fifth year on the air. She aired the best bits of interviews from New Order, PJ Harvey, Radiohead, The Killers, Gossip and many more, as well as sessions that have been recorded for the show over the past 5 years. On June 13, it was announced that Curtis would be getting a new show, imaginatively titled The Show, airing from Mondays to Thursdays between 10 p.m. and midnight. The Show – a "music based pop culture" programme – will act as a complement to Tom Dunne's Pet Sounds before it.
- On Thursday May 22, Bruce Springsteen "rocked" the RDS Arena in Dublin in the first of three shows. He returned to rock the RDS again on Saturday May 24 and Sunday May 25. His setlist included "Promised Land", "Radio Nowhere", "Prove It All Night", "The River", "Thunder Road", "Badlands", "Because the Night", "Born to Run" and about 20 other classics. Explaining why the missus wasn't with him, Springsteen said: "Patti's at home. The cookies have been taken out of the oven. The Guinness is being poured. My favourite clothes are being sold on eBay. No, we've got three teenagers, one of whom is graduating." Photos
- Soundtrack '08 took place in Tripod and Crawdaddy from Sunday May 25 until Monday June 2. Spiritualized, Public Enemy and Tapes 'n Tapes all performed over the week-long festival, whilst The Maccabees played their first ever headline Irish show on Thursday May 29 at the indoor festival, promoted by POD. Santigold and Mystery Jets were forced to cancel their Soundtrack shows. Mystery Jets cited "unforeseen circumstances" as the reason behind the cancellation of their show on Saturday May 31, whilst Santogold cancelled her AAA co-headliner scheduled for Sunday June 1 in the PoD Complex due to "illness". Mystery Jets rescheduled for August 16, with tickets for the original date still valid.
- On Tuesday May 27 at 9 a.m., tickets for Tom Waits's three Phoenix Park shows in July and August went on sale. Waits will perform at The RatCellar Marquee on July 30 – August 1, three of fifteen dates on the European leg of his Glitter and Doom Tour. Tickets were priced from €116.25 to €131.25, were limited to two per person and will be subject to scanning at the gate on the day. All tickets for the three dates sold out within three hours, the ticket-selling process only taking longer than usual due to the anti-scalping measures in place.
- The Rory Gallagher International Tribute Festival took place in Ballyshannon, County Donegal from Thursday May 29 until Sunday June 1.
- On Friday May 30, Celine Dion played Croke Park, Dublin on her fortieth birthday with support from Il Divo.
- Also on Friday May 30 at 9 a.m., tickets for Morrissey's June 28 show at the Royal Hospital, Kilmainham went on sale.
- Humanitarian rock stars Bono and Bob Geldof guest edited the Friday May 31 edition of the Asahi, Japan's second largest newspaper. Bono defended the pair's temporary career change by saying: "Lots of people are closet rock stars – they stand up in the mirror and play air guitar, well, myself and Bob, we're closet journalists." The main aims of the pair were to change Africa's negative coverage in the Japanese media and to encourage Japan to increase its African aid and investment. The eight-page Africa section focused on Africa's culture, economy and politics rather than poverty and war. Bono said: "Really we're trying to reframe the stories about Africa, most of which historically are tragic. We would like to turn this around a bit and make the stories about opportunity and the adventure of the African continent, not the burden and the obligation."

=== June ===
- Heineken Green Spheres took place in June, with Dirty Pretty Things playing as the headline attraction on June 2 in Dolan's Warehouse in Limerick. Tickets were free, but had to be applied for in advance from www.heinekengreenspheres.ie.
- On Friday June 6 and Saturday June 7, Radiohead played two outdoor concerts at Malahide Castle in Dublin. They were supported by Bat for Lashes. Thom Yorke urged Irish fans travelling to and from their Malahide Castle shows to be more carbon conscious this summer, by travelling by public transport, by foot or in a car pool. A section of the car park was turned into a bicycle-only zone so fans could cut down on their carbon emissions. The park had a capacity for a huge number of bicycles and was well guarded by security so that fans could leave their cars at home for Radiohead's shows. Photos
- On Saturday June 7, Bon Jovi played Punchestown. They were supported by Razorlight and Kid Rock. Bon Jovi last performed in Ireland when they played Croke Park in 2006. They played for two-and-a-half hours, with the show featuring state-of-the-art giant video screens and special effects. Gates opened at 3 p.m. and the show began at 7 p.m.
- On Monday June 9 at 11 a.m., forty new acts as well as the full stage line-up of Oxegen 2008 was announced. New acts confirmed included Mundy, Aslan, Captain and Sugababes for the Friday and Eddy Grant, Flogging Molly and Fight Like Apes for the Sunday.
- On June 12, reports of the demise of the concert business in Ireland have been greatly exaggerated with the business never having been healthier, says leading concert promoter, Peter Aiken.
- On June 14 and 15, Leonard Cohen played two dates at the Royal Hospital, Kilmainham. The shows, brought to Ireland by Pod Concerts and AEG Live, were his first Irish dates in twenty years. A third date, Friday June 13, was added later. Support on all three dates came from Damien Rice who serenaded Cohen in March 2008 when he was inducted into the Rock and Roll Hall of Fame in New York City. Gates opened at 5:30 p.m. and the shows will begin at 7:30 p.m.
- Also on Saturday June 14, Neil Diamond returned to Ireland after an absence of nearly four years to play Croke Park, Dublin. Tickets cost €69.50.
- On Monday June 16, Iggy and the Stooges played the Royal Hospital, Kilmainham. Gates opened at 6 p.m. with support coming from The Kills and Stiff Little Fingers who took to the stage at 7 p.m. Iggy took to the stage at 9 p.m. Tickets cost €55 with more information to be found on pod.ie. Fans were urged to travel by public transport.
- Prince was scheduled to play Croke Park on June 16. He had previously played in Páirc Uí Chaoimh on July 7, 1990. On June 10, MCD confirmed the show had been cancelled for what are described as "reasons beyond the control" of both the artist and MCD. The 55,161 ticket holders were able to obtain a full ticket refund including booking fee from their Ticketmaster point of purchase from 9 a.m. on Friday June 13. The six days notice was too much for some, with Today FM's Ray Foley expressing his disappointment and shock live on radio having just heard the news as he came on air.
- On Friday June 20, The Police returned to Ireland following their performance at Croke Park on October 6, 2007. On this occasion they played at Stormont. KT Tunstall supported.
- Also on Friday June 20, Eric Clapton played the Marquee in Cork. On Saturday June 21, Clapton played Malahide Castle in Dublin, his first Dublin appearance since the Point in 2004. He was supported by special guests Robert Randolph and the Family Band. The show was notable for being amongst the victims of heavy weather that hit Ireland that weekend which also saw a number of children struck down with hypothermia at a Westlife show in Galway.
- On Sunday June 22, an, as yet, unannounced act played Malahide Castle in Dublin, with details to be announced in coming months.
- On Monday June 23, Lou Reed played the Marquee in Cork.
- Morrissey played two Irish dates in June. The first, on Thursday June 26, took place at the Marquee in Cork and is an Aiken Promotions event, whilst the second, on Saturday June 28, took place at the Royal Hospital, Kilmainham and was promoted by Pod Concerts as a successor to their Iggy Pop and Leonard Cohen shows at the same venue earlier in the month.
- Glastonbury 2008 took place from Friday June 27 until Sunday June 29. Amongst the Irish acts performing were Fight Like Apes, who started a UK tour on May 22. They took to the Late 'n' Live Stage on Friday, June 27 at 8 p.m. and also won a second slot on the BBC Introducing Stage on Saturday, June 28 at 8 p.m. Jape shared a stage with CSS, Battles and MGMT on the Saturday whilst Róisín Murphy played support to Fatboy Slim in the Dance Village. Dublin bluegrass outfit Prison Love meanwhile opened the Avalon stage on the Sunday. Also appearing were Eleanor McEvoy, Sinéad O'Connor (both Friday on Acoustic Stage), Academy Award winner Glen Hansard (Saturday on Acoustic Stage), Ilya K, The Inishowen Gospel Choir, The Flaws and Ham Sandwich were scheduled to appear despite frontwoman, Niamh Farrell giving birth less than a month before the event.
- On Saturday June 28 or Sunday June 29, Malahide Castle hosted another outdoor event, details of which were confirmed at a later date. On March 5, this was confirmed to be Neil Young (Sunday June 29), who also played the Marquee in Cork the following night.

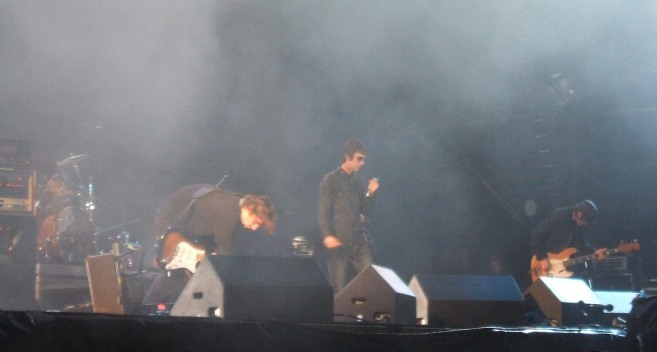
Reformed band The Verve appeared at Oxegen 2008.

=== July ===
- Beck is coming to Ireland in July "for a live date or two".
- On July 3, Paul Simon played the Marquee in Cork. Comedian Tommy Tiernan was originally to perform on July 3, but agreed to put his gig back a day to accommodate Simon who was only available to perform on the 3rd.
- Oxegen 2008 took place from Friday July 11 until Sunday July 13 at Punchestown Racecourse in Naas, County Kildare. It was a three-day affair for the first time ever. Headliners R.E.M., The Verve, Rage Against the Machine, Kings of Leon and Kaiser Chiefs were amongst the performing bands and musicians. Other artists to feature included Amy Winehouse, Interpol, Editors, Ian Brown, Stereophonics, The Fratellis, The Kooks, The Raconteurs, The Prodigy, The Chemical Brothers, Manic Street Preachers and Republic of Loose.
- On Tuesday July 15, Meat Loaf was forced to postpone an appearance at Bundoran Live until the following day over stage safety fears. "We just had real security issues inside, like the tent falling down on the audience and the stage falling down, and lights falling down, so yeah, real security issues", he told Ocean FM. Chris de Burgh, Des Bishop and Shayne Ward were also due to perform in the marquee in the following week. Meat Loaf was later threatened with legal action after yelling at the audience: "You can thank me for saving your fucking lives. This fucking tent would have fallen down all around you." Sean McEniff was outraged and, showing how backwards Bundoran really is, had this to say: "....the language is unrepeatable what he called me....it's with my legal people at the moment...if I was in the audience I wouldn't be very happy about it either, he called them a name too...I can assure you he won't be welcome back in Bundoran, he's burned his bridges".
- On July 22, the nominees for the 2008 Mercury Prize were announced, with Irish artists being overlooked for the award given on September 9. Fionn Regan was the last Irish nominee in 2007.
- On Friday July 25 at 9 a.m., tickets for Coldplay's O_{2} show on December 21 went on sale limited to four per person/transaction. Despite an extra show being added (December 22), all tickets for both shows still sold out within minutes of going on sale, with promoters saying the extra tickets did not satisfy demand.
- On July 30 and July 31, Tom Waits played two critically acclaimed shows in Dublin's Phoenix Park at The RatCellar Marquee as part of his Glitter and Doom Tour. Tickets, priced from €116.25 to €131.25, went on sale on Tuesday May 27 at 9 a.m. A third date was later added, August 1. The shows, promoted by Aiken Promotions, were Waits's first Irish shows in 21 years. He last played Dublin in 1987, when he performed at the Olympia Theatre. Tickets for Waits's summer shows were limited to two per person but, in an effort to beat touts, a valid I.D. (passport or driving licence) matching the name on the ticket were required to gain entry. Gates opened at 6:30 and the show kicked off at 8 p.m.

=== August ===
- Indie-pendence 2008 took place at New Square in Mitchelstown, County Cork from August 1 to 3. Amongst the performers were The Blizzards, Cathy Davey, Ham Sandwich, Dispatches, The Flaws, Fight Like Apes, The Chapters, Dirty Epics, Dispatches, Alphastates and Travega.
- On Saturday August 2 and Sunday August 3, Castlepalooza 2008 took place at Charleville Castle in Tullamore, County Offaly. There were appearances from The Parlotones, Mystery Jets, Republic of Loose, Fight Like Apes and The Flaws.
- From Monday August 11 until Friday August 15, a new series of one-day gigs will take place in Belfast. On Monday August 11, The Flaming Lips played Belfast's Custom House Square, supported by Mogwai, Oppenheimer and Jape, whilst The Zutons will play on the final day, Friday August 15, with support from The Go! Team, Skibunny, Mystery Jets, Dan le sac vs Scroobius Pip and Delorentos. Tickets priced £35 and £30 respectively went on sale at 9 a.m. on Monday May 12, 2008. The Enemy, supported by Reverend and The Makers, Fighting with Wire, Future of the Left and General Fiasco, played on August 14. Tickets for this show went on sale on Friday June 13 and were priced £13.75-£27.50. Information for shows scheduled to take place on the Tuesday and Wednesday has not yet been released. The shows are part of a new series of one-day gigs, which will run in the city this summer under the Belsonic banner.
- On Wednesday August 13, Muse played Marlay Park in Dublin, following their Meteor Award-winning show at Oxegen last summer. They took to the stage at 21:15 and were supported by Kasabian and Glasvegas.
- On Tuesday August 19, Lenny Kravitz, Alanis Morissette and OneRepublic played Marlay Park in Dublin, with support from The Script.
- On Wednesday August 20, Metallica played Marlay Park in Dublin, with support from Tenacious D.
- On Thursday August 21, The Killers played Marlay Park in Dublin, in what was supposed to be one of just three dates they were to perform during the summer. They were supported by Bloc Party and Louis XIV. The Killers also played a more intimate show in The Academy the night before with organisers issuing no physical tickets: in order to combat touts, valid ID was needed and tickets had to be collected on the evening and exchanged for a wristband. Tickets went on sale on Friday August 1, priced €44.20.
- On Saturday August 23, Lovebox Dublin took place in Marlay Park. Maxïmo Park, N.E.R.D, Paolo Nutini, Sam Sparro, Gorillaz, Kid Creole and the Coconuts and Plain White T's performed on the day. Early Bird tickets priced €49.20 went on sale on Friday June 27 at 9.00 a.m.
- Electric Picnic 2008 took place from August 29–31. Sex Pistols headlined the Sunday, George Clinton and Franz Ferdinand headlined the Saturday whilst Sigur Rós headlined the Friday. The reformed My Bloody Valentine headlined the Electric Arena on the Sunday night. Sinéad O'Connor played the Saturday and That Petrol Emotion reformed to play the festival. Other female artists included Goldfrapp, Santigold, CSS, New Young Pony Club, Duffy, Cathy Davey and The Breeders.

=== September ===
Ash performed their 1977 album in London in September 2008.

- Cois Fharraige took place from September 5–7 in Kilkee, County Clare. It was headlined by Travis, Supergrass and The Zutons and will also feature The Futureheads, Seasick Steve, Ocean Colour Scene's Simon and Oscar, Starsailor, Kíla, The Coronas, Cathy Davey and 28 Costumes. Win tickets
- Ash performed their classic 1977 album at a sold-out show in London's The Roundhouse on September 5. They also played B-sides and other tracks from that era of their career.
- On September 8, new Dublin station Radio Nova 100 was granted a Classic Rock licence by the Broadcasting Commission of Ireland. The station had been considered for the licence alongside Dublin Rock Radio Limited and East Coast Digital Media Limited, the people behind Phantom 105.2 and East Coast Radio respectively. According to Radio Nova 100's application, listeners could expect music from artists such as Queen, U2, Thin Lizzy, Red Hot Chili Peppers, The Police, Bob Seger, Nirvana, Bruce Springsteen, The Clash, Elvis Costello and Tom Petty.
- The 6th Hard Working Class Heroes took place on the streets of Temple Bar from September 12–14. Following the success of 2007's "Scandinavian Invasion", Sons and Daughters curated the 2008 "Scottish Invasion", bringing with them fifteen emerging bands from Scotland.
- On September 13, Kraftwerk played a tented 4,999-capacity show originally scheduled for Luggala, County Wicklow (later moved to the Royal Hospital Kilmainham due to adverse flooding conditions). Tickets priced €89.50 went on sale on Friday July 18. Running under the A Day In The Life banner, the event kicked off at 3 p.m. and also featured Los Angeles' Lucent Dossier Vaudeville Cirque, Comtron, The Jimmy Cake, Dark Room Notes, Boxcutter and D1 DJs . The two-hour concert is Kraftwerk's only show in western Europe this year. News of the event, to take place two weeks after Electric Picnic was expected to close the festival season, was described as "music to the ears of fans who would otherwise be suffering the horrors of post-festival cold turkey". There was, however, "an air of farce" when a curtain refused to close for the appearance of four robots for the song, "The Robots".
- On September 29, it was announced that Autamata and Jape had both been shortlisted for 'Best Budget Video' at the UK Music Video Awards, which take place in London's Odeon West End on October 14. Their respective 'Need You Sunshine' and 'Floating' clips were nominated alongside Example's 'Me And Mandy', Lise Westzynthius 'Childlike Curves' and These New Puritans' 'Elvis'. Also representing Ireland in the 'Best Styling In A Video' category was Róisín Murphy, nominated alongside Gnarls Barkley, Klaxons, Late of the Pier, Sonny J and The Hoosiers and D.A.D.D.Y. in the 'Best New Director' category.

=== October ===
- U2 plan to release their twelfth studio album, the follow-up to 2004's How to Dismantle an Atomic Bomb. It will be followed by a twelve-month world tour. Following a stint in Dublin's Windmill Lane Studios earlier in the year, the band moved to France in May 2008 to continue recording No Line on the Horizon. In August there was much unconcern when a Dutch fan uploaded poor quality recordings of four songs from the album ("Moment Of Surrender", "For Your Love", "Sexy Boots" and "No Line On The Horizon") onto YouTube, after recording them on his mobile phone as they blared out a window of Bono's French Riviera retreat in Eze-sur-Mere.
- From October 4–5, The Music Show took place in the RDS in Dublin. Ireland's only music exhibition, it displayed an array of musical instruments, technology and live music and be a gathering of musicians, industry professionals and music fans. Daily tickets were €5 for children, €10 for adults and €25 for families (2 adults plus up to 4 children). Amongst the artists performing on the Live Stage were Republic of Loose, The Blizzards, The Coronas, Ham Sandwich, Damien Dempsey, Cathy Davey, Fionn Regan and Declan O'Rourke.
- On October 13, it was announced that The Answer would open for AC/DC on the North American leg of their Black Ice World Tour. The tour runs from October 28 to January 31 and includes two sell-out Madison Square Garden shows on November 12–13. The following day, an April 18, 2009 date at the O_{2}, Dublin was announced with tickets, going on sale on October 17, selling out in two minutes flat.
- On October 15, Oasis confirmed themselves as Slane 2009 headliners. Noel Gallagher and guitarist Gem Archer flew by helicopter into the County Meath venue for a photoshoot and press conference. The show will take place on Saturday June 20, 2009. Promoter MCD had planned to keep the announcement secret but news was leaked on online bulletin boards and blogs with media reports beginning to leak the evening before. Tickets sell out within two hours.
- On October 31, Motörhead played the Ambassador Theatre, Dublin.

=== November ===
- On November 28, Live at the Marquee 2009 was launched, with the announcement that The Prodigy, Gilbert O'Sullivan, Kasabian, Christy Moore, Josh Ritter and Rod Stewart would be taking apart.

=== December ===
- On December 1, RTÉ's digital radio revolution began, with the official launch of five new digital radio and broadband services which have been on trial for twenty months. They are Choice, a sister speech station to RTÉ Radio 1; easy listening and ambient service Chill; Junior, which is aimed at two to ten-year-olds; the dance-minded Pulse; and 2XM, a sister station to the rock and indie components of RTÉ 2fm.
- On December 8, TV3 Ireland announced it was to axe the Channel 6 late night music video show Night Shift. The last show was due to air on December 31. The move meant there were no national outlets on television for Irish bands to get their videos shown.
- By December 11, Enya's seventh full-length studio album And Winter Came... had reached the Top 20 in twenty-one countries, three weeks after release.
- On December 19, U2 announced that their twelfth studio album No Line on the Horizon would be released on 2 March 2009.
- Dublin's O_{2} opened on December 16, with the annual ChildLine Concert the first event to be held there. A few days prior to this, U2 members Bono and The Edge struck the first musical note by playing guitars and singing "Van Diemen's Land" and "Desire" to an O_{2} empty but for Harry Crosbie, Gerry Ryan and a handful of other people. Kings of Leon with support from M83 performed the venue's first rock concert on December 19 and Coldplay's PR company encountered a hostile reaction from State for its strict rules which saw the magazine provide one of only two press photographers to shoot one of their 21–22 December Viva la Vida Tour shows. They were ushered into an area "no more than 10 foot by three foot, about 100 metres from the centre of the stage", allowed to photograph the second, third and fourth songs only and forced to sign contracts by the company to hand over all copyright of their pictures to make use of as they wished.
- On December 29, U2 drummer Larry Mullen, Jr. was reported to have criticised his band colleague Bono in an interview with Q. Mullen said he "cringes" when he sees Bono with former British Prime Minister Tony Blair and outgoing United States President George W. Bush, stating that Blair was "a war criminal" even more so than Bush because he was "intelligent".

== Bands disbanded ==
- The Chalets (Friday February 15)
- Aine Mangaoang leaves Hooray for Humans (Friday February 15)
- Le Bien (Friday February 29)
- Mainline undergo name change – now known as The Brothers Movement (Tuesday March 4)
- Graham Hopkins leaves Boss Volenti (Friday September 5)
- Brian Crosby leaves Bell X1 (Thursday October 2)

== Albums & EPs ==
Over 180 Irish albums were released in 2008.

Below is a list of notable albums & EPs released by Irish artists in Ireland in 2008.

Issue date	Album title	Artist	Source	Sales	Notes
January 28	Weightless	Juno Falls			
February 15	Carry the Meek	Ham Sandwich			^{* Review * UK release in late May/early June}
February	???	The Infomatics			
March 21	Eleven Modern Antiquities	Pugwash			
March 28	Gypsy Trip	Jaded Sun			
Spring 2008	Let the Truth Be Told	Laura Izibor			
April 4	White Wonder	Crayonsmith			^{Released by Out On A Limb Records.}
April 18	Welcome to the Cusp	Giveamanakick			
April 18	Spectre & Crown	The Jimmy Cake			
April 25	Friendlier Up Here	The Aftermath			
April 27	I'm Siding With My Captors	So Cow			
May 19	Love Must Be Tough	Eleanor McEvoy			
May 2	The Hollow of Morning	Gemma Hayes			
May 2	Vol IV: Johnny Pyro and the Dance of Evil	Republic of Loose			Review
May 9	Pleasant Square	Robotnik			
May 10	Wizards Of The Coast	Sea Dog			
May 16	Haunt Me When I'm Drowsy	Halves			7-Track Album
May 23	Go God Go	Fred			^{Played a live set in their local HMV in Cork on Tuesday June 3.}
May 30	Windows to the Soul	Dave Browne			^{First Irish album to be made available in USB format, exclusively from HMV stores}
May 31	Rocky VI Reckyrd	The Vinny Club			
June 3	Take the Whole Midrange and Boost It	Oppenheimer			
June 4	Ritual	Jape			
June 6	The Rocky Road	Damien Dempsey			Went to #1 in the Irish Albums Chart
June 13	Sanctuary	Various			
June 27	Sweeter than Bourbon	Seneca			^{Preceded by the Top 20 Irish Singles Chart success of their "Clarity" single.}
July 21	Boy / October / War	U2	Review		^{Deluxe edition rereleases}^{* Each will include a 32-page booklet featuring unseen photos, lyrics and liner notes by The Edge and band associates like Paul Morley, Neil McCormick and Hot Press editor Niall Stokes plus a bonus disc of rare collectibles.}
August 8	Rocket Ship	Red Kid			^{* The album launch will take place in Crawdaddy, Dublin on August 8, with support from The Hot Sprockets. * Named after the 2006 single of the same name.}
August 15	God Bless The Big Bang	Rory Gallagher			^{Debut solo album}
August 15	The Swell Season: Live From The Artists Den (DVD)	The Swell Season			^{Recorded in Seattle's Good Shepherd Center Chapel shortly before Glen and Marketa won their Oscar, the 14-song set includes 'Say It To Me Now', 'Lay Me Down', 'All The Way Down', 'This Low', 'When Your Mind's Made Up', 'Lies', 'Drown Out', 'Falling Slowly', 'Golden', 'Pavement Tune', 'Once', 'If You Want Me', 'Concentric' and 'Star Star'.}
September	Lines & Space	Niall Colfer			
September	Good Vibrations (EP)	The Undertones			^{Limited-edition vinyl reproduction of four-tracker released to celebrate the 30th anniversary of "Teenage Kicks" Also features "Smarter Than U", "True Confessions" and "Emergency Cases". Also released is The Undertones: An Anthology, a 2-CD package featuring 29 of their best-known songs plus 27 previously unreleased demos, alternative takes, session and live tracks. Further album reissues, special compilations and a deluxe box-set to follow in 2009.}
September 5	The Hare's Corner	Colm Mac Con Iomaire	Review		^{Debut solo album}
September 5	Happy the Man	The Guggenheim Grotto	Guggenheim Grotto » home		
September 5	UK Tour '75	Thin Lizzy			^{Features the band's much-bootlegged November 1975 visit to Derby College. Noticeable for being the first tour to feature the twin-guitar attack of Scott Gorham and Brian Robertson, the track-listing is: "Fighting My Way Back", "It's Only The Money", "Wild One", "For Those Who Love To Live", "Still In Love With You", "Showdown", "Suicide", "Rosalie", "The Rocker", "Sha La La", "Baby Drives Me Crazy", "Me And The Boys", "Cowboy Song", "Little Darling" and "Sound Check Jam". A digitally enhanced version of the original master tape, the album comes complete with a 20-page booklet featuring dozens of previously unseen photos and extensive Brian Downey liner notes. Being so new that it didn't have a title yet, Phil Lynott jokingly refers to "Cowboy Song" as "Derby Blues".}
September 12	Domino Effect	The Blizzards			^{Recorded in 2008}
September 12	Sea Sew	Lisa Hannigan			
September 12	Changes	Liu Fang and Michael O'Toole			10 tracks including pieces from Chinese tradition, Philip Glass, Astor Piazzolla, Antonio Vivaldi, Toshiyuki Hiraoka, Ian Wilson, and Béla Bartók
September 20	Under a Blood Red Sky	U2			^{Available in three different formats – DVD + CD Deluxe, single CD and single vinyl – which will all have expanded artwork and sleeve notes.}
September 26	Fight Like Apes and the Mystery of the Golden Medallion	Fight Like Apes			^{Recorded in Seattle with producer John Goodmanson (Blonde Redhead, Blood Brothers) Artwork}
Late September	1977	Ash			^{4CD deluxe edition includes the Trailer mini-album, Live at the Wireless, Live At Reading 1996, plus rarities and B-sides.}
October	Never Leave Anywhere	The Hedge Schools			
October 3	Make Happy War (EP)	Grand Pocket Orchestra			^{The tracklist features live favourite "Ballet Shoes" along with "Using The Body", "Down With The Label Man" and "Bite The Head Off Italy".}
October 3	Lir Live	Lir			^{A posthumous live album released through the independent label, 1969}
October 13	Appetite For Reconstruction (remix album)	Super Extra Bonus Party			
October 17	I Never Thought This Day Would Come	Duke Special			^{Artwork Review}
October 17	From The Word Go	Messiah J and the Expert			^{Assembled between 2006 and 2008 in their own Labbey Road studio and includes collaborations with singers Leda Egri, Joanne Daly and Ro and Kieran from Delorentos.}
October 31	Straight In No Kissing	Dirty Epics			^{The band signed a distribution deal with Universal for the record.}
November 7	And Winter Came...	Enya			
Early November	Post Romantic	Pony Club			
November 18	Friday Night	The Brilliant Trees			^{The band's debut album was reissued over a decade after original release. Also re-released were singles "Talent" and "Home".}
November 21	Time to Tell the Parents (EP)	Green Lights			^{The follow-up to their debut EP, Small Curious Things (2007), available in Tower and Road Records in Dublin, or by download from the Green Lights MySpace. Lead single is "Cut To The Chase".}

Summer +

- After a Long Silence – Travega (Summer 2008)
- ??? – Nicole Maguire (October 2008)
- Slacky Tidy – David Kitt (2008)
- A Hundred Million Suns – Snow Patrol (October 24, 2008)
  (Before Christmas) ^{According to Tony Fenton, Today FM, April 29, 2008.}
  (October) ^{According to Jonny Quinn in a Belfast Telegraph interview, July 31, 2008.} Music Lessons Artwork
- No Line on the Horizon – U2 (November 14, 2008) ^{Expected title, according to THE STAR – THE GOSS, August 16, 2008, page 16}

Date unknown

- ??? – The Answer (2008)
- ??? – Bell X1 (2008)
- ??? – The Chalets (2008)
- ??? – Concerto For Constantine (2008)
- ??? – Dark Room Notes (2008) ^{Recording set for London's Flood Studios in July}
- ??? – Director (2008)
- ??? – The Frames (2008)
- ??? – Hal (2008)
- ??? – Humanzi (2008)
- ??? – Listen... Tanks! (2008)
- Changes – Liu Fang and Michael O'Toole (2008)
- ??? – The Rags (2008)
- ??? – Red Organ Serpent Sound (2008)
- ??? – Therapy? (2008)
- ??? – The Walls (2008)

== Singles ==
Below is a list of notable singles released by Irish artists in Ireland in 2008.

Issue date	Song title	Artist	Source	Sales	Notes
January 25	"KeepsaKe"	Ham Sandwich			(Download only)
February	"Bullrun"	Travega			Released to radio on February 5.
February 8	"Sing for Your Supper"	Cathy Davey			
February 10	"We People Who Are Darker Than Blue"	Republic of Loose & Sinéad O'Connor			(iTunes Download)
February 15	"Ragdoll"	David Geraghty			
February 22	"Take Me Away"	Pugwash			
February 29	"Bite the Bullet"	The Kinetiks			(Download only)
March	"Already Sleeping"	Hooray For Humans			
March	"Bruised from Kisses"	The Radio			
March 7	"The Cure"	Dirty Epics			
April 4	"I Like Music"	Republic of Loose	Video		iTunes and all other download platforms in Ireland
April 4	"Maybe This is not Love"	Joe Chester			Free Download
End of April	"Moving"	Cathy Davey			
May	"Footprints"	Supermodel Twins			Reached #2 in the Download Chart
May 2	"After All That's Happened"	Niall Colfer			Available from iTunes on May 9
May 2	"Out of Our Hands"	Gemma Hayes			Digital release
May 2	"The Bodies Start to Move"	Joe Chester			Free Download
May 2	"Waking Up in America"	The Guggenheim Grotto	Guggenheim Grotto » home		Available from iTunes
May 2	"Shed a Little Light"	Foy Vance			Available for download
May 9	"Harmonic"	The Minutes			Digital release date
May 15	"Skyscrapers"	Fred			Available to download from 7Digital (www.7digitalmedia.com)
May 16	"Out Tonight"	The Flaws	Video		Download only
May 30	"Rainy Night in Soho"	Damien Dempsey			Pogues cover
End of May	"Congratulations"	Kanyu Tree			
June 16	"Breakaway"	Joe Echo			
June 20	"The Steady Song"	Republic of Loose			
July 1	"Chocolate Factory"	The Pale			Paired with "Lady Gregory" on CD and also available for free digital download on iTunes
July 11	"Something Global"	Fight Like Apes			Taken from forthcoming debut album
July 15	"Atom Bomb"	Juno Falls			* From the album Weightless
August 1	"I'm Gonna Be"	Nicole Maguire			
August 1	"This Time Next Summer"	Supermodel Twins			
August 8	"Running"	Fred			
August 15	"Japanese Toy"	Cowboy X			
August 15	"Back to Front"	The Infomatics			^{Second single by the hip hop act}
August 25	"Lille"	Lisa Hannigan			
August 29	"Trust Me I'm a Doctor"	The Blizzards			
September 5	"Tin Tin"	Peakin' Trippers			^{Reached #45 in the Irish Singles Chart}
September 19	"Easy As It Flows"	Carosel			^{Taken from their forthcoming album Kaleidoscope and available in both digital and CD formats.}
September 19	"Jake Summers"	Fight Like Apes			^{* Originally on the How Am I Supposed To Kill You If You Have All The Guns EP. * "Snore Bore Whore" (Spherical mix) features as the b-side to the CD version, while the 7" is accompanied by "Corey Pop" and a matching hand-stamped bag.}
September 19	"Enough Is Enough"	Myp et Jeep			^{Taken from their debut album Blood is Not Enough, due in January 2009 on Reekus Records.}
October 3	"Megaphone Man"	Messiah J and the Expert	Video		^{Released on Inaudible Records (Cavallerro) (RMG Digital)}
October 10	"Guided by Ghosts"	Codes			^{Recorded with producer Greg Haver and released on both hard copy (HMV) and download (via iTunes and downloadmusic.ie)}
October 10	"Coming Back Around"	DC Tempest			^{Winners of the Hot Press/Sennheiser competition to play the Live Stage at The Music Show}
October 10	"Way Too Pretty"	Dirty Epics			
October 13	"Take Back the City"	Snow Patrol			
October 17	"Sweet Sweet Kisses"	Duke Special			
October	"About You Now"	The Saw Doctors			^{Cover of Sugababes hit as performed on The Podge and Rodge Show. Reached #1 in the Irish Singles Chart – week ending 17 October 2008. Proceeds – €10,000 on that date – given to Galway's Salerno Cystic Fibrosis Fund.}
October	"Broken Glass"	Fight Like Apes			^{Seventh single by the band. Hot Press proclaim them veterans.}
October 31	"You Feel the Fire!"	Le Galaxie			
November	"The Reason"	The Blizzards			
November 7	"From My Heart to Yours"	Laura Izibor			^{Taken from her debut album Let The Truth Be Told, due for international release by Atlantic Records in January 2009.}
November 10	"The Things""	The Things			^{Taken from the album Some Kind of a Kick.}
November 14	"The Lights"	Fred			
November 28	"The Reason"	The Blizzards			
December 12	"Crack the Shutters"	Snow Patrol			
December 19	"Phil Lynott"	Jape			^{Taken from the album Ritual}

Unknown

- "Idolise" – The Flaws
- "I Was a Man" – Jape
- "Minsk" – Concerto For Constantine (offered as free download by Phantom FM)
- "Bring It on Home" – John Strong
- "We Bleed the Blood of Androids" – Le Galaxie (Summer 2008)

== Festivals ==
=== Oxegen 2008 ===
- Oxegen 2008 was a three-day affair for the first time ever. It took place from Friday July 11 until Sunday July 13 at Punchestown Racecourse in Naas, County Kildare. Amongst the headliners were R.E.M., Rage Against the Machine, The Verve and Kaiser Chiefs whilst Kings of Leon, Interpol and The Fratellis returned after their performances at Oxegen 2007. Also making an appearance were The Raconteurs, Ian Brown, Counting Crows, Stereophonics, The Prodigy, The Feeling, Panic! at the Disco, Amy Winehouse, Manic Street Preachers, The Kooks, Echo & the Bunnymen, Feeder, Bell X1, MGMT, The Ting Tings and Black Kids. So too did Oscar winners Glen Hansard and Markéta Irglová. Editors made their fourth consecutive appearance, performing on the Main Stage for the first time.

=== Electric Picnic 2008 ===
- Electric Picnic 2008 took place over the weekend of August 29–31. It was headlined by Sigur Rós, George Clinton and Sex Pistols. Other bands to perform included My Bloody Valentine, Faust, Tindersticks, Franz Ferdinand, Sigur Rós, The Breeders, Grinderman and Carbon/Silicon. Irish acts to appear included Kíla, The Stunning, Sinéad O'Connor, Christy Moore, Liam Ó Maonlaí, Boss Volenti, The Waterboys, The Flaws, Le Galaxie, Ham Sandwich, Fred, Super Extra Bonus Party, Jape, Lisa Hannigan, Cathy Davey, Gemma Hayes and Mark Geary.

=== Heineken Green Energy ===
- Heineken Green Energy Festival took place for the 13th year in May 2008. Nick Cave and the Bad Seeds headlined the Dublin Castle event on May 3, Radio Soulwax headlined on Sunday May 4 and The Kooks headlined on Monday May 5.

=== Garden Party 2008 ===
- Garden Party was due to be held at Ballinlough Castle in Athboy, County Meath in June. However, it was shelved.

=== Bud Rising ===
- Bud Rising Spring: The lineup for Dublin's Bud Rising April weekend (April 9–13) featured The Streets, Hard-Fi, The Raveonettes, The Ting Tings, Maps, Erol Alkan, Future of the Left, Fight Like Apes and Hadouken!, amongst others.
  - April 9 – Channel One played support to Hard-Fi at The Olympia.
  - April 10 – Boom Jackson played support to The Raveonettes at The Village.
  - April 12 – Choice Music Prize winners Super Extra Bonus Party performed at Whelan's and Cap Pas Cap played support to The Ting Tings at The Village.
  - Bud Rising Street Party took place on Saturday, April 12 outdoors at George's Dock on Custom House Quay in Dublin, with Mix Master Mike, DJ Morgan and live graffiti man Maser as well as headliners, The Streets.

=== Slane 2008 ===
- Slane 2008 was cancelled for the second time in three years. Lord Henry Mountcharles said he couldn't find the right act to play Slane Castle this year. There will instead be a smaller concert at the estate in August, possibly for up and coming Irish bands. Mountcharles resisted pressure to book two major acts for Slane in 2008. With pals desperately trying to persuade him to sign up one of the rock bands, he stood firm saying they were not up to scratch.

== Music awards ==
=== 2008 Meteor Awards ===
The 2008 Meteor Awards took place in the RDS Simmonscourt on Friday February 15, 2008. Below are the winners:

Award	Winner(s)
Best Irish Male	Duke Special
Best Irish Female	Cathy Davey
Best Irish Band	Aslan
Best Irish Album	Addicted to Company (Paddy Casey)
Best Irish Pop Act	Westlife
Best Irish Live Performance	The Blizzards (Oxegen 2007)
Best National DJ	Ray Foley
Best Regional DJ	Keith Cunningham
Hope for 2008	Ham Sandwich
Most Downloaded Irish Song	"Galway Girl" (Mundy & Sharon Shannon)
Best International Male	Bruce Springsteen
Best International Female	Amy Winehouse
Best International Band	Radiohead
Best International Album	Neon Bible (Arcade Fire)
Best Live International Performance	Muse (Oxegen 2007)
Industry Award	Jim Aiken
Humanitarian Award	Mary Donohoe, Founder and Chairperson of The Rose Project
Lifetime Achievement Award	The Saw Doctors

=== Choice Music Prize ===
The Choice Music Prize for Irish Album of the Year 2007 was awarded at Vicar Street to Super Extra Bonus Party for the album Super Extra Bonus Party LP on February 27, 2008.
