= Electric Picnic 2008 =

2008 arts and music festival

- Genre: Rock
- Dates: 29–31 August 2008
- Locations: Stradbally, County Laois, Ireland
- Website: www.electricpicnic.ie

Electric Picnic 2008 was the fifth Electric Picnic festival to take place. The three-day event took place on the weekend of Friday–Sunday, 29–31 August at Stradbally in County Laois, Ireland. The festival was headlined by Sigur Rós on the Friday, George Clinton and Franz Ferdinand on the Saturday, and My Bloody Valentine and Sex Pistols on the Sunday.

Florence and the Machine performed for the first time in Ireland at Electric Picnic 2008.

== Build-up ==
=== Tickets ===
The 2008 festival was confirmed when the official Electric Picnic website announced the usual pre-sale was to happen again. These tickets went on sale on 9 November 2007 and full price tickets went on sale on Friday 28 March at 9 p.m. Weekend tickets—there are no individual day ones—cost €240 including camping, with the various sites opening at 9 a.m. on Friday 29 August. Camper van access cost €60. Also available were family tickets permitting entrance for two adults plus four children aged 12 and under. Otherwise it was strictly over 18s with photo ID required. Tickets had sold out by 17 June.

In the buildup to the festival the main page of the official website was replaced by a sequence of brightly coloured boxes (originally smaller in number and toward the centre of the screen but subsequently expanded). For a period this would reveal a 'secret' message concerning the line-up followed by the caption, "Electric Picnic, August 2008, Stradbally Estate, County Laois". The boxes then became more erratic and the message evolved to reveal a particular date and time referring to the release of the line-up.

=== Jeopardy threats ===
The 2008 festival was thrown into jeopardy in June when the Irish Music Rights Organisation said Pod Concerts had no right to run the festival again. IMRO is seeking more than €432,000 from the promoter because of royalties allegedly not paid from a series of music festivals, including Lovebox and Garden Party, over the past four years. The organisers had to make reassurances that the festival was in no doubt or jeopardy. They also had to deny rumours that the site was flooded in the build-up to the festival.

== The festival ==
The 2008 festival was attended by more than 32,000 people.

Main Stage at Electric Picnic in 2008

=== Music ===
Sigur Rós, George Clinton and Sex Pistols headlined. Other musicians appearing included My Bloody Valentine, Franz Ferdinand, German rockers Faust, Tindersticks, The Breeders, Grinderman, Goldfrapp, Gomez, Gossip, CSS, Duffy, Foals, Hadouken!, Wilco, The Roots, Turin Brakes, Carbon/Silicon, Conor Oberst and New Young Pony Club. Irish acts to appear included Kíla, The Stunning, Sinéad O'Connor, Christy Moore, Liam Ó Maonlaí, Boss Volenti, The Waterboys, The Flaws, Ham Sandwich, Fred, Super Extra Bonus Party, Jape, Lisa Hannigan, Cathy Davey, Gemma Hayes and Mark Geary.

The initial line-up was officially announced on Wednesday 26 March at 18:00.

The Bodytonic tent line-up for 2008 included Ben Klock, Ashley Beedle, Linkwood, Calibre, Spillywalker (live), Siphon and Syntheastwood. Plans for their Twisted Pepper stage continue, with a Digitonic AV/VJ showcase assisted by Vince Watson, Eddie Brennan of POGO, Barry Donavan from Lunar Disko, 091, Shed and Redshape.

=== Hot Press Chatroom ===
The Hot Press Chatroom returned for a fourth consecutive year, hosting exclusive public interviews with some of the weekend's big names, including Carbon/Silicon, Elbow, The Flaws, That Petrol Emotion, The Stunning, Mark Geary, Cathy Davey, Kíla, Josh Ritter, James Yorkston, The Roots, Gemma Hayes and Michael Franti, Oppenheimer, Jinx Lennon, Joe Rooney and his very special comedy guests, Foals and David Holmes. On the Friday, Kíla's Hogan brothers talked of their Main Stage show that day, which featured a custom-made backdrop, Brazilian dancers and an acrobat show. On the Saturday, Elbow frontman Guy Garvey talked about his band's celebrity fans John Cale and the Coen brothers and explained how he ended up appearing on record with Cathy Davey, Oppenheimer told how they went from relative obscurity to having tracks appear on hit US TV show Ugly Betty, Cathy Davey appeared with her dog, Rex to discuss the success of her latest album, her forthcoming show at the Dublin Fringe, her version of the events that led up to the Elbow collaboration, and how she got on supporting R.E.M. at the Olympia whilst That Petrol Emotion members Steve Mack and Raymond Gorman telling of their decision to play Electric Picnic after turning down several high-profile support slots for the likes of U2 and David Bowie, and discussed the possibility of recording together again. On the Sunday, Foals spoke of the incident at Summercase in Barcelona the previous month where themselves and Kaiser Chiefs broke up a fight when Bloc Party frontman Kele Okereke was assaulted and racially abused by members of John Lydon's entourage.

Friday
Time	Artist/Group
17:00	Jinx Lennon
18:00	Kíla
19:00	Carbon/Silicon
21:00	The Stunning

Saturday
Time	Artist/Group
14:00	Josh Ritter
15:00	Elbow
15:45	Oppenheimer
16:45	Cathy Davey
17:30	That Petrol Emotion
18:30	James Yorkston
?	David Holmes

Sunday
Time	Artist/Group
15:00	The Flaws
15:45	Mark Geary
16:30	Foals
17:00	Joe Rooney and comedy guests
17:30	Gemma Hayes
18:00	The Roots
20:00	Michael Franti

=== Amnesty International ===
Amnesty International were present at the 2008 festival, hosting a series of events to mark the 60th anniversary of the Universal Declaration of Human Rights. The Amnesty marquee was located beside the Leviathan tent, and hosted half-hourly bingo games with big prizes and celebrity announcers Brendan Courtney, (Off the Rails), Karl Spain (The Panel) and George McMahon (Mondo from Fair City). The Freedom Café also made a reappearance this year. The Sunday night of the festival featured a singalong of "Happy Birthday" before the Sex Pistols's Main Stage set, which was followed by a party in the Amnesty tent. Roddy Doyle and Anne Enright were amongst the writers at Leviathan who read their contributions to The Irish Times/Amnesty International series on the Declaration, followed by a panel discussion chaired by Hugh Linehan. Also on site were thirty distinctive yellow and black numbered boxes scattered throughout, to serve as meeting points for punters.

The Eileens returned to help Amnesty International promote their special bingo session. "Murf and Mac", grandmother Eileen Murphy and great-grandmother Eileen McGillycuddy from Killorglin, County Kerry were filmed for an RTÉ documentary attending the 2007 festival.

=== Art ===
==== Burning Man Temple ====
The 55-foot wooden Temple of Truth by acclaimed American artist David Best resembled a cross between the Eiffel Tower and a Buddhist temple. The construction was carried out on site and took four months to prepare. At the end of the weekend it was set on fire by the family of a young male who took his own life.

==== Elephants ====
Also on site, there was a herd of 13 life-size Asian elephants, constructed in Clonakilty, County Cork. They had been touring Ireland and Britain to raise awareness of the fate of elephants in India. The charity Elephant Family built the sculptures; it was founded by twin sisters Ruth and Mary Powys.

=== Comedy ===
Comedian David O'Doherty staged his first gig in Ireland since winning the comedy world's most prestigious award at the Edinburgh Fringe Festival.

=== Cookery ===
Five celebrity Michelin Star chefs staged "cook-offs" at the festival. Food critic Tom Doorley judged the event.

== Camping ==
=== Myhabs ===
For 2008, Electric Picnic introduced the Myhab eco-friendly alternative to camping. Ticket holders could book a two-person Myhab, which was located in the yellow campsite. When they arrived at the site, the Myhabs were waiting for them. Myhab users also had access to toilets, hot showers, a safe box for valuables, and it was easy to find as it could be personalised when booked online. Myhabs were waterproof, spacious, and made from reusable, recyclable materials.

=== Poisoning incident ===
On the Sunday at around 7 am, a privately hired specially converted double-decker bus containing twelve sleeping people was reported as having a faulty generator and had apparently begun leaking carbon monoxide. One person was taken to the intensive care unit in Portlaoise General Hospital and was said to be in a stable condition. A second person was sent to hospital as a precaution.

== Aftermath ==
Hundreds of cars became stuck in the mud in the aftermath of Electric Picnic. Heavy rain on the Sunday night left the fields soggy and partly flooded on the Monday morning, following the wettest August in over 170 years. Heavy rain overnight left the fields where cars were parked very wet. Tractors were called in to tow out some vehicles. This led to heavy traffic around Stradbally, particularly the Abbeyleix road. Gardaí cracking down on drink driving arrested a number of people on the Monday morning following on from six other arrests over the weekend.

== 2008 Line-up ==
Friday 29 August	Saturday 30 August	Sunday 31 August
Main Stage: Sigur Rós; Goldfrapp; Tinariwen; Kíla; Yard Dogs	Main Stage: George Clinton; Franz Ferdinand; Wilco; Duffy; The Herbaliser; Antibulas; Liam Ó Maonlaí; Kormac feat. BS Quartet	Main Stage: Sex Pistols; Gossip; The Roots; Michael Franti & Spearhead; The Congos; Candi Staton; Hayseed Dixie; Dublin Gospel Choir

Friday 29 August	Saturday 30 August	Sunday 31 August
Electric Arena: Digitalism; The Stunning; New Young Pony Club; Le Galaxie	Electric Arena: Underworld; Grace Jones; Elbow; The Breeders; Midnight Juggernauts; Ulrich Schnauss; Super Extra Bonus Party	Electric Arena: My Bloody Valentine; Grinderman; CSS; Sinéad O'Connor; Hercules and Love Affair; Wolfgang Haffner; Cowboy X

Friday 29 August	Saturday 30 August	Sunday 31 August
Crawdaddy Stage: Gomez; The Gutter Twins; Christy Moore; Jape; Wallis Bird; Giveamanakick	Crawdaddy Stage: Tindersticks; Josh Ritter; Lisa Hannigan; That Petrol Emotion; The Kills; Cathy Davey; Laura Izibor; Boss Volenti; The Flaws	Crawdaddy Stage: Conor Oberst; Hadouken!; Stephen Malkmus; Foals; Turin Brakes; Gemma Hayes; Florence and the Machine; Ham Sandwich

- Crystal Castles
- Dan Deacon
- Grace Jones
- Joan As Policewoman
- Tartit
- Micah P. Hinson
- Juana Molina
- Large Mound
- One Day International
- Faust
- Tobias Froberg
- Cut Copy
- Blitzen Trapper
- Emmy The Great
- Adrian Crowley
- Henry Rollins
- The Noisettes
- The Waterboys
- The Lionheart Brothers
- Dawn Landes
- Lou Rhodes
- Constantines
- Absentee
- Balanescu Quartet
- Carbon/Silicon
- Pustra/Vile-een's Vaudeville

Preceded by Electric Picnic 2007	Electric Picnic; 2008	Succeeded by Electric Picnic 2009
