= Ain't Them Bodies Saints (soundtrack) =

Ain't Them Bodies Saints (Original Motion Picture Soundtrack)

Film score by Daniel Hart
- Released: August 13, 2013
- Recorded: 2012–2013
- Genre: Film score
- Length: 53:49
- Label: Lakeshore
- Producer: Daniel Hart

Daniel Hart chronology
Pioneer (2011)	Ain't Them Bodies Sants (2013)	Comet (2015)

Ain't Them Bodies Saints (Original Motion Picture Soundtrack) is the soundtrack to the 2013 film Ain't Them Bodies Saints directed by David Lowery. Featuring musical score composed by Daniel Hart, the soundtrack was released through Lakeshore Records on August 13, 2013.

== Development ==
Daniel Hart was announced as the film's composer in December 2012, in his maiden film scoring assignment; he had collaborated with Lowery on his short films St. Nick (2009) and Pioneer (2011). Lowery gave the script to Hart during the summer of 2012. They discussed the potential soundscape and instrumentation Lowery had in mind for the film, and in principle decided on the logistics for composing the film. For the sound, Hart had in mind a small string ensemble, low brass and atmospheric drones. He laid the foundation for the sound of the film when scoring the montage in which Bob goes to prison and Ruth gives birth to their baby. The piece he wrote for that scene ended up including all the instrumentation heard throughout the film: strings, brass, mandolin, cimbalom, droning banjo, and percussion.

Hart found the film to be a delicate balance between "the softness of love and the hardness of desperation" which in turn takes a violent tone, both overtly and softly. Hence, he eventually treated the score in the same way to represent the qualities in David's vision. He utilized country-western and percussive sounds to modernize the film and balance it in between the past and present by clapping and using folk instruments to provide both western and non-western sound. After watching few sequences from the footage that Lowery had shot, he sent him a piece featuring hand claps that worked well in that scene.

The banjo sound heard throughout the film was intentional. Hart claimed its sole purpose is to ring and drone continuously in an attempt to create a slightly unsettling feeling. 60% of the score was scored at Hart's home studio, where most of the banjo, mandolin, handclaps, guitar, and solo violins were recorded. The string sections, brass, and drum kit were recorded at songwriter Curtis Heath's home studio. Heath also wrote some the original songs for the score. The score was mixed at Public Hi-Fi in Austin, Texas.

== Reception ==
A. O. Scott of The New York Times wrote: "The musical score, by Daniel Hart, is too often busy and insistent when the film needs it to be plaintive and spare." Mark Kermode of The Guardian wrote: "composer Daniel Hart tips his hat toward the work of Warren Ellis and Nick Cave. The rhythmic hand-claps that accompany key pieces are particularly evocative, reminiscent of Jonny Greenwood's percussive violin-picking in There Will Be Blood – edgy, insistent and unsettling." Adam Woodward, in his review for Little White Lies, wrote: "Daniel Hart’s ubiquitous score of nervy, tiptoeing strings and soft handclaps gives the film a dream-like quality." Christy Lemire of RogerEbert.com called the score as "highly inventive" and opined that it "enhances the rapturous experience". Todd McCarthy of The Hollywood Reporter described it as "an emphatically original score [...] that employs an enormous variety of unusual motifs that impressively coalesce into a memorable whole that doesn't use typical country or Southern music as a crutch." Eric Kohn of IndieWire wrote: "Daniel Hart’s uplifting score heightens the emotional weight at hand". Critic based at Movie Music Mania wrote: "Daniel Hart’s brilliant, inventive little score is perfectly in tune with the pulse of Ain’t Them Bodies Saints." The score had been listed as one of the best film scores of 2013 by MTV, Den of Geek, and PopMatters. The album was ranked at number 9 on the Best Original Score or Soundtrack according to a survey from IndieWire Critic's Poll.

== Track listing ==
Ain't Them Bodies Saints (Original Motion Picture Soundtrack) track listing
No.	Title	Artist(s)	Length
1.	"Atbs Theme"		2:10
2.	"Ruth and Sylvie"		2:58
3.	"Freddy's Dead/Sylvie's Born"		3:14
4.	"Fixer Upper"		2:34
5.	"Bob Escapes"		2:56
6.	"Ruth Tries to Write"		2:51
7.	"Skerritt Reads the Letter"		2:53
8.	"Do You Remember That Day?"		2:07
9.	"Sweet Talk"		2:25
10.	"The Last Shootout"		4:09
11.	"Inside the Farmhouse"		2:18
12.	"The Lights"	Keith Carradine	3:27
13.	"Blue Jay"	Curtis Heath	1:15
14.	"Ain't Long Enough"	Andrew Tinker	3:23
15.	"Here We Are"	Greg Schroeder; Mara Lee Miller	2:34
16.	"He Never Told Me"	Annell Brodeur	2:57
17.	"Been Waiting"	Heath; John Graney	2:13
18.	"Appalachian Abduction"	Heath	2:09
19.	"Siren Call"	Aaron Kyle	5:16
Total length:			53:49
