= Ten Past Seven =

Irish instrumental rock band

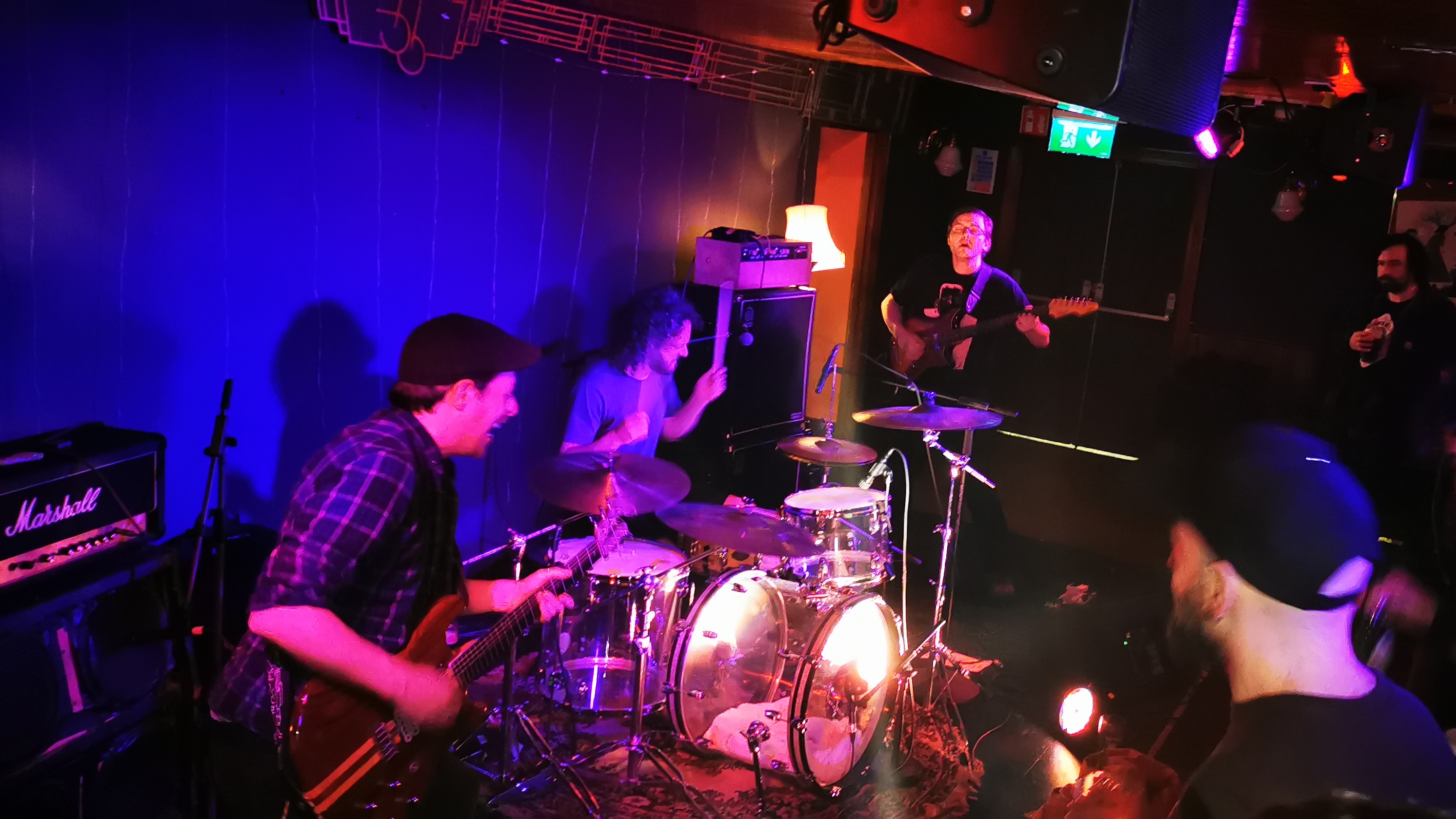
- Ten Past Seven performing at Bello Bar, Dublin, in March 2022.

Background information
- Origin: County Kerry, Ireland
- Genres: Instrumental rock; math rock
- Years active: 2002-present
- Labels: Out On A Limb Records, Art For Blind
- Members: Matt Shallow (bass); Ger Mangan (drums); Rory O’Brien (guitar)

Ten Past Seven are an instrumental rock band from County Kerry, Ireland. Formed in 2002, the group have released two full-length albums, two EPS and one single. Their debut album Shut Up Your Face was released in 2006 by the independent record label Out On A Limb Records.

== History ==
Ten Past Seven formed in 2002 while studying at Coláiste Stiofáin Naofa. They self-released their debut EP “onehundredandfiftydegrees” in September 2002. Their debut album Shut Up Your Face was released in 2006 on the Irish independent label Out On A Limb Records. In a four star review for The Irish Times, music journalist Jim Carrol wrote: "Ten Past Seven succeed in kicking out more exhilarating jams than the vast majority of their peers." RTÉ wrote; “when they opt for all-out fury they're a fearsome proposition that should fear no-one they have to share a stage with.” In 2010 they released the EP Bother Bui, which featured collaborations with Irish musicians Katie Kim and Laura Sheeran. In July 2011 the group raised money through crowdfunding to record the EP Black Box Recordings at the Block Box studio in France. Their sophomore album, Long Live the Bogwalrus, was released in November 2020 by the independent record label Art for Blind. The Quietus wrote; "Coarse riffs, writhing bass grooves and galloping drum frenzies invoke the gravelly golden era of Ireland’s mid-00s math rock scene."

== Releases ==
=== Albums ===
- Shut Up Your Face (2006)
- Long Live The Bogwalrus (2020)

=== Extended plays ===
- onehundredandfiftydegrees (2002)
- Bothar Buí (2010)
- Black Box Recordings (2011)

=== Singles ===
- Anifeiliaid (2011)
