= Soundtrack '08 =

Soundtrack 08
- Soundtrack 08 logo
- Genre: Indie rock, folk, hip hop
- Dates: 25 May – 2 June
- Locations: Dublin, Ireland
- Years active: 2008
- Website: Official POD site

Soundtrack '08 was a series of indoor nightly music events that took place in the POD Complex in Dublin, Ireland. The event was composed of forty-five acts, performing over nine days from 25 May – 2 June 2008. Promoted by POD Concerts, it was billed as the presenter of "past, present and future soundtracks" combining a series of early shows in the Tripod and Crawdaddy venues in Dublin's Harcourt Street as well as DJ sets taking place in late night clubs. Various music styles including indie rock, hip hop and folk were featured, bringing the newest acts of note emerging in the international music scene to Dublin.

== Tag-line ==
- Soundtrack 08 – 45 acts – 9 Days – 1 Venue

== Shows by date ==
=== 25 May ===
The opening night of Soundtrack 08 saw Midnight Juggernauts and Late of the Pier feature in a double bill in Crawdaddy. Hip Hop luminaries, Public Enemy performed their seminal album, It Takes a Nation of Millions to Hold Us Back (which celebrates its 20th anniversary this year) at Tripod. The producers of this genre defining release, The Bomb Squad played support as did Cadence Weapon who is at the forefront of the next generation of hip hop greats. In a club show, Sydney collective Bang Gang DJs played Crawdaddy.

=== 26 May ===
The following night saw The Mae Shi, Crayonsmith and Noah and the Whale feature in a triple headliner at Crawdaddy.

=== 27 May ===
On Tuesday 27 May, Tapes 'n Tapes played a double headliner with Sons and Daughters at Tripod. Port O'Brien was also on the bill.

=== 28 May ===
Indie pop duo Joy Zipper played their first Dublin show in three years in Crawdaddy on Wednesday 28 May. They showcased material from their forthcoming album. Support was provided on the night by Gavin Glass and the Holy Shakers. Spiritualized, supported by London instrumentalists, Sian Alice Group played Tripod. Grovesnor, one time Hot Chip drummer, brought his own brand of electro soul to centre stage in a club show, with support from Antics DJs.

=== 29 May ===
On Thursday 28 May, Beth Rowley ("fusing a vintage sound and sensibility with a joyous, contemporary edge") and Peter von Poehl (who performed his debut offering on the renowned Bella Union label, Going to Where the Tea Trees Are) played Crawdaddy. Brighton hotshots, The Maccabees played their first ever headline Irish show at Tripod. Wildbeasts and Eastern Conference Champions provided support. French Euro beat doctors Radioclit played a club show with support from Mr. Jones DJs. On the same night, Turzi played Crawdaddy with support from Maximum Joy DJs.

=== 30 May ===
On Friday 30 May, three-piece psych-pop combo The Ruby Suns brought their Polynesian rhythms and djembe drums to the Crawdaddy stage. Brooklyn experimentalists Telepathe played their first ever Dublin show, their debut album Dance Mother is due for release in the summer. Boston three-piece, Buffalo Tom and David Kitt played a joint headliner at Tripod, David Kitt's only Dublin gig this year. Later, Simbad & Zed Bias played POD with support from Dublin's Stereotonic DJs. In Crawdaddy, DJ Marky was on the decks. Seminal DJ Sasha played in Tripod.

=== 31 May ===
On Saturday 31 May, the debut headline Dublin show at Crawdaddy by Mystery Jets was cancelled due to "unforeseen circumstances". Dubliners Autumn Owls were due to play support. Grammy Award-winning De La Soul brought their colourful innovative sampling and clever rhymes to Tripod. Later, We Smoke Fags played a live set in Crawdaddy with support from Pogo DJs. Lawrence aka Sten Live played POD, with support from Barry Redsetta.

=== 1 June ===
On Sunday 1 June, an AAA event with Booka Shade, Santogold, Evil Nine, Alex Metric, El Guincho, Boy 8-Bit, Splitloop and Stu Breakology took place. However Santogold cancelled due to illness. Tickets for this event were €25 and allowed access to Tripod/ POD/CrawDaddy & Lobby Bar.

=== 2 June ===
On Monday 2 June, South By SouthWest festival performers, Bon Iver came to Ireland for their debut show at Crawdaddy. Top 10 iTunes success, Get Well Soon supported alongside James McMorrow.

== Shows by venue ==
=== Early shows ===
==== Crawdaddy ====
- 25 May – Double Headliner: Midnight Juggernauts and Late of the Pier – Crawdaddy-Doors- Tix
- 26 May – The Mae Shi, Crayonsmith, Noah and the Whale – Crawdaddy- Doors- Tix
- 28 May – Joy Zipper. Support: Gavin Glass – Crawdaddy – Doors- Tix
- 29 May – Double Headliner: Beth Rowley and Peter Von Poehl – Crawdaddy – Doors – Tix
- 30 May – Ruby Suns. Support: Telepathe and Robotnick – Crawdaddy – Doors – Tix
- 31 May – Mystery Jets (cancelled). Support: Autumn Owls – Crawdaddy- Doors – Tix
- 2 June – Bon Iver. Support: Get Well Soon and James McMorrow – Crawdaddy – Doors – Tix

==== Tripod ====
- 25 May – Public Enemy. Support: Cadence Weapon and The Bomb Squad – TRIPOD – Doors – Tix
- 27 May – Double Headliner: Tapes ‘n’ Tapes and Sons and Daughters. Support: Port O’Brien – TRIPOD – Doors – Tix
- 28 May – Spiritualized. Support: Sian Alice Group – TRIPOD – Doors – TIX
- 29 May – The Maccabees. Support: Wildbeasts and East Coast Conference – TRIPOD – DOORS – TIX
- 30 May – Double Headliner: David Kitt and Buffalo Tom

=== Later shows ===
- 25 May – Bang Gang DJs – Crawdaddy – Doors 11pm (running late after LOTP and MJ) – Tix TBC
- 28 May – Shit Disco, Grovesnor, Support: Antics DJs – Crawdaddy – Doors 11pm – Tix 5 EURO
- 29 May – Radioclit, Support: Mr Jones DJs – POD – Doors 11pm – Tix 8/6 EURO
- 29 May – Turzi, Support: Maximum Joy DJs – Crawdaddy – Doors 11pm – Tix 10 EURO
- 30 May – Simbad & Zed Bias, Support: Stereotonic DJs – POD – Doors 11pm – Tix 18/14 EURO
- 30 May – DJ Marky, Support: Stereotonic DJs – Crawdaddy – Doors 11pm – Tix 18/14 EURO
- 30 May – Sasha – Tripod – Doors 11pm – Tix 33.50 EURO
- 31 May – We Smoke Fags (live), Support: POGO DJs – Crawdaddy – Doors 11pm – Tix 14/10 EURO
- 31 May – Lawrence aka Sten Live, Support: Barry Redsetta – POD – Doors 11pm – Tix 14/10 EURO
