= Plugd Records =

Independent record store and coffee shop

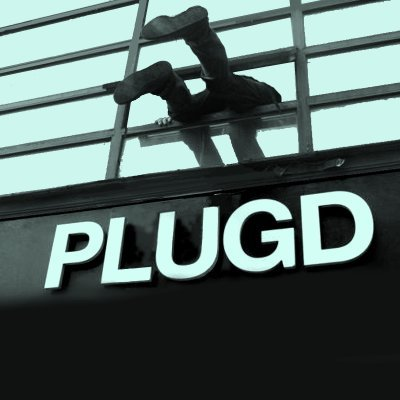
- Current logo of Plugd Records, depicting proprietor Jim Horgan entering its former Washington Street location in Cork, Ireland via an upstairs window.
- Company type: Music retailer, café, live music venue
- Industry: Retail, food service, live events, culture
- Founded: 2001 (as physical retailer); 2020 (as online retailer)
- Headquarters: Cornmarket Street, Cork City, Ireland
- Products: Records, CDs, cassettes, books, zines, accessories; coffee, snacks, wine; live music events
- Website: plugdrecords.com

Plugd Records (sometimes stylised as PLUGD Records; and referred to locally as Plugd) is an independent record shop, café and concert venue in Cork City, Ireland.

Founded in 2001 by Jim Horgan, and co-run until 2018 alongside Out on a Limb Records co-founder Albert Twomey; the shop sells records, CDs, cassettes and printed matter like zines, functioning from its infancy as an important social hub for Cork's independent music community.

At its current premises on the city's quayside Cornmarket Street, it also functions as a local coffee shop and an intimate events venue, continuing an operations model utilised successfully at its previous locations.

In a 2023 article on Cork's music scene for Bandcamp Daily, journalist Mariana Timony referred to the shop as "nothing less than Cork DIY’s spiritual home", and to Horgan as "a Cork underground institution".

In addition to its ongoing activities, the Plugd Records name was briefly used for a label operating from the shop, credited with co-releasing a 2013 double-vinyl pressing of local band Rest's second album, I Hold the Wolf.

== History ==
Founded by Horgan in 2001, the shop was originally based on Cork's Washington Street as a two-floor premises, also selling live event tickets and exhibiting local visual art, until the location's closure in 2009.

Plugd subsequently sold records from a weekly stall at the now-defunct Réalt Dearg pub among other locations, before relocating to the former ESB substation on Caroline Street on a temporary basis.

In 2011, the shop found a new home, on the first floor of the Triskel Arts Centre, Tobin Street, with its sister café and music venue, Gulpd Café, located on the ground floor.

In 2017, the shop relocated to the top floor of The Roundy bar in the Queen's Old Castle area of the city, where it continued to function as a venue in the evenings.

Upon the onset of the Covid-19 pandemic, the shop's operations at the Roundy ceased; with Horgan opening an official online store in mid-2020, and retailing on select weekends and occasions at anarchist bookshop and community space Rebel Reads, in the city's docklands Marina Business Park.

In 2022, Plugd opened a new physical record shop and café on the city's Cornmarket Street (colloquially known as the Coal Quay), which also continues to function as an intimate venue. Plugd also collaborates on live events with nearby outdoor venue TEST SITE, as well as with numerous local collectives and initiatives.

== Performances ==
Notable artists and DJs to have performed at Plugd Records' locations, related venues and live events banner include:

- Anna Mieke
- Bantum
- Benoit Pioulard
- Boa Morte
- Brian MacGloinn
- Brigid Mae Power
- Cian Nugent
- David Kitt
- Denise Chaila
- Goodiepal
- Hilary Woods
- Huerco S.
- JyellowL
- Katie Kim
- Lori Goldston
- Maija Sofia
- MMOTHS
- Nadja
- O Emperor
- Paddy Shine
- Richard Dawson
- Ryley Walker
- Sam Amidon
- Seamus Fogarty
- September Girls
- Xylouris White
