= Leaving My Empire =

Studio album by Fred
- Released: April 15, 2011
- Recorded: Hotel2Tango, Montreal, Quebec, Canada
- Genre: Alternative
- Length: 48:42
- Label: RCM
- Producers: Fred, Howard Bilerman

Fred chronology
Go God Go	Leaving My Empire

Singles from Leaving My Empire
- 1. "Trial By Fire" Released: November 26, 2010; 2. "If Not Now When" Released: March 30, 2011

Leaving My Empire is the fourth studio album from Irish alternative band Fred. The album was recorded in Montreal, Quebec, Canada by Howard Bilerman (who also worked with Arcade Fire). Additional recording for the album was done at Lovetap Studios in the band's native Cork. Mixing was done by Ben Hillier and the album was mastered by Andy Vandette at Masterdisk, New York. Additional recording instrumentation on the album was provided by Larissa O'Grady (strings) and Eamon Nolan (trumpet).

== Reception ==
Leaving My Empire received favourable reviews from several Irish music blogs and websites. State.ie called it "a record that will appeal as much to your whistling dairy deliverer as your cooler than cool younger brother.", while Swearimnotpaul.com said "This album is a lot of things, but mostly it’s fun."

Professional ratings
Review scores
Source	Rating
Entertainment.ie	4/5 stars
Swearimnotpaul.com	4/5 stars
Heinekenmusic.ie	4.5/5 stars
Independent.ie	4/5 stars

== Track listing ==
All tracks are written by Fred.

No.	Title	Length
1.	"If Not Now When"	04:28
2.	"The Life Behind"	04:42
3.	"Somewhere Else"	03:48
4.	"Eleven"	04:43
5.	"Stereoscope"	04:39
6.	"As You See"	05:03
7.	"Villains"	04:05
8.	"Fears And Remedies"	04:29
9.	"Trial By Fire"	04:01
10.	"Everything"	04:52
11.	"We Are The City Now"	03:55
