= Liu Fang =

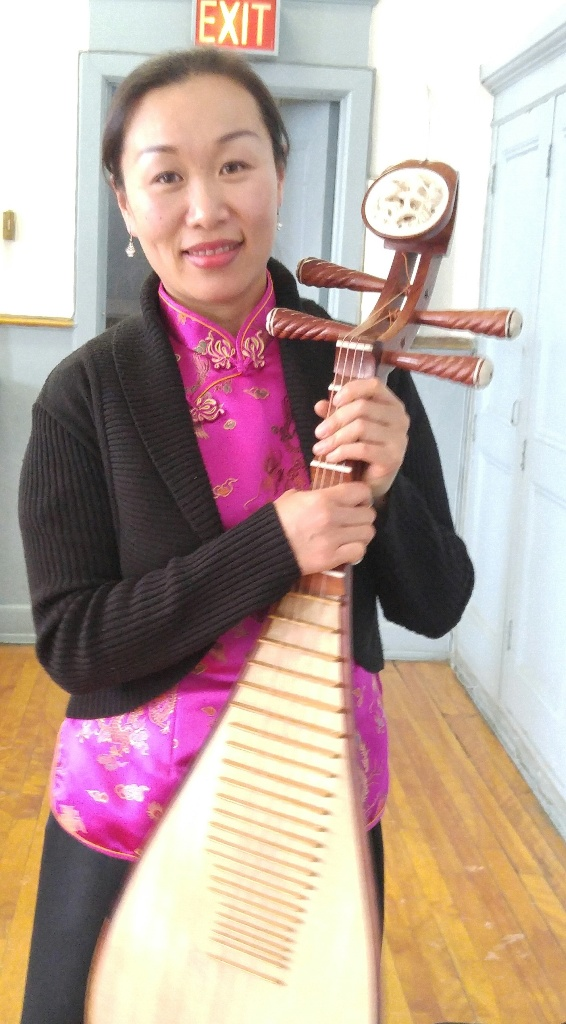
- Liu Fang

Background information
- Born: May 10, 1974 (age 51); Kunming, Yunnan, China
- Genres: Chinese music from the classical tradition / Contemporary classical music / World Music
- Occupation: Soloist
- Instruments: pipa and guzheng
- Years active: 1985-present
- Website: www.philmultic.com

Liu Fang (Chinese: t 劉芳, s 刘芳, p Liú Fāng; b. 1974) is a Chinese–Canadian musician who is one of the most prominent pipa players in the world. Described in the media as the "empress of pipa" (L'actualité), "divine mediator" (World), "the greatest ambassadress of the art of the pipa", Liu Fang is known as "possessing virtuoso technique, grace and a unique empathy toward the music she plays – whether it is a traditional and folk tune or a modern Western composition" (All Music Guide). "She has an extraordinary focused, poised presence in her manner and her playing. In a lesser player this is just a trained formality; the body of material and techniques for her instruments is extremely highly developed, passed down through centuries. But Liu Fang’s total devotion to her playing has moved her beyond perfect execution to the creativity and flexibility that marks a true musician."(in the fRoots Magazine, 06.2006).

== Biography ==
Born in Kunming in the Chinese province of Yunnan, she began playing the pipa at the age of 6. Her first solo public performance was at the age of 9. In 1986, at age 11, she played for Queen Elizabeth II. Her studies at the Shanghai Conservatory of Music broadened her musical range and allowed her to study the guzheng. At the age of 22, Liu Fang immigrated to Canada and is now a Canadian citizen, currently residing in Montreal. The decision to move to Quebec allowed her virtuosic playing to reach a wider international audience. Since 1999, she has performed hundreds of solo concerts featuring Chinese traditional and classical music on her two solo instruments - pipa and guzheng. Her profile has risen due to her rich and deeply spiritual performances as well as a wide-ranging repertoire that features music from Chinese classical and folk traditions (including pieces rarely heard) as well as contemporary works from both east and west.

== Side projects ==
Apart from her numerous solo concerts, Liu Fang has also many intercultural collaborations in terms of "Silk and Steel Projects", where "Silk" represents the traditional culture of China whereas "steel" is a metaphor for modernity and western culture. Her last album entitled "Silk Sound" (Le son de soie) featured musical dialogues with artists from three different continents and was awarded the grand prize of L'Académie Charles Cros, the French equivalent of the US Recording Academy.

== Awards ==
Back in 2001, Liu Fang was the only musician to receive the prestigious "Future Generation Millennium Prize" awarded by the Canada Council for the Arts to three artists of different disciplines under 30 years of age. The words of the jury summed up her achievements rather succinctly: "Liu Fang's mastery of the pipa and the guzheng has established her international reputation as a highly talented young interpreter of traditional Chinese music. She aspires to combine her knowledge and practice of eastern traditions with western classical music, contemporary music and improvisation, thereby creating new musical forms, uniting different cultures and discovering new audiences."

== Live performances ==
Liu Fang has made a number of national and international radio and TV appearances, produced several CDs. Liu Fang was invited as one of the featured artists by BBC World Service for the concert on November 7, 2003, dedicated to World AIDS Day. She performed at the 60th anniversary of UNESCO in Paris on November 16, 2005, and has also been honored by the government of Canada. She has performed with orchestras, string quartets and various instruments the works of many contemporary composers, including R. Murray Schafer, Tan Dun, Philip Glass, Janet Maguire, Ian Wilson, José Evangelista, Zhou Long, Melissa Hui, Diego Luzuriaga, Chen Yi, Toshiyuki Hiraoka, Yoshiharu Takahashi, David Loeb, Hugue Leclair, Simon Bertrand and Chantale Laplante, to mention a few, and has performed frequently with guitarist Michael O'Toole and the violinist Malcolm Goldstein.

== Movie Soundtracks ==
- 2012: Summer in Provence, Directed by Christian Lara
- 2011: We Need to Talk About Kevin (film), directed by Lynne Ramsay
- 2007: Up the Yangtze, directed by Yung Chang.
- 1998: The sun rises over Tian-An-Men Square, directed by Shui-Bo Wang.

== Discography ==
Albums solo :

- The soul of pipa, vol. 3 : Pipa Music from Chinese folk traditions, Philmultic, 2006
- Emerging Lotus : Chinese traditional guzheng music, Philmultic, 2005
- The soul of pipa, vol. 2 : Chinese classical Pipa Music: from the ancient to the recent, Philmultic, 2003
- The soul of pipa, vol. 1 : Chinese Pipa Music from the classical tradition, Philmultic, Canada, 2001
- Chinese Traditional Pipa Music : Oliver Sudden Productions Inc, Canada/USA, 1997

Collaborations :

- Along the Way - Duo pipa & violin : Philmultic, 2010
- Changes - Duo pipa & Guitar : Philmultic, 2008
- Le son de soie : Accords-Croisés/Harmonia Mundi, Paris, 2006
- Mei Hua - Fleur de prunier : ATMA Classique, Canada, 2004
- Arabic and Chinese music : Liu Fang et Farhan Sabbagh, Philmultic, 2000
- Musique chinoise : Solo, duo, et avec orchestre de chambre, Philmultic, 1999
