= The Universe Is Laughing =

Studio album by The Guggenheim Grotto
- Released: June 15, 2010
- Genre: Folk; Alternative rock
- Length: 36:40
- Label: United for Opportunity

The Guggenheim Grotto chronology
Happy the Man (2008)	The Universe Is Laughing (2010)

The Universe Is Laughing is the third full-length album from County Mayo/Wexford, Ireland folk-pop band The Guggenheim Grotto. It was originally released on June 15, 2010, by the New York-based indie label United For Opportunity.

== Track listing ==
1. "Trust Me I'm a Thief" - 3:56
2. "Map of the Human Heart" - 3:54
3. "Wings and Feathers" - 3:53
4. "Never Before" - 2:54
5. "Concentrate" - 5:09
6. "Wisdom" - 3:35
7. "Ruby Heart" - 3:33
8. "Spiegel Song" - 3:25
9. "The Universe Is Laughing" - 3:07
10. "Diamond" - 3:00
