= ...Waltzing Alone =

Studio album by The Guggenheim Grotto
- Released: September 9, 2005
- Genre: Folk; Alternative rock
- Length: 46:20
- Label: Rykodisc; UFO Music

The Guggenheim Grotto chronology
A Lifetime in Heat (2004)	...Waltzing Alone (2005)	Told You So (2007)

Professional ratings
Review scores
Source	Rating
Marin Independent Journal	link

...Waltzing Alone is the first full-length album from the Dublin, Ireland folk-pop band The Guggenheim Grotto. It was originally released in Ireland on September 9, 2005 by Rykodisc, and then on September 26, 2006 in the US and Canada by United For Opportunity.

The song "Philosophia" was featured as the iTunes free download for the week of April 16, 2007.

== Track listing ==
No.	Title	Length
1.	"Philosophia"	3:11
2.	"Portmarnock Beach Boy Blue"	3:42
3.	"Told You So"	4:08
4.	"Wonderful Wizard"	3:38
5.	"Rosanna"	3:57
6.	"I Think I Love You"	3:33
7.	"Ozymandias"	3:40
8.	"A Lifetime In Heat"	4:56
9.	"Koan"	4:41
10.	"Vertigo"	4:46
11.	"Cold Truth"	4:35
12.	"Tromboner"	1:32
