= Making Music So You Don't Have To =

Studio album by Fred
- Released: 2005
- Label: RCM

Fred chronology
Can't Stop, I'm Being Timed (2002)	Making Music So You Don't Have To (2005)	Go God Go (2008)

Making Music So You Don't Have To is the second studio album of Fred.

Hot Press described the album as "a ticklish, impulsive body of work, but its happy, functional marriage of strings, piano and guitars hints that the band have played nice, taken their hyperactivity medication and developed the album into a gratifyingly mature, ambitious and reflective work".

== Track listing ==
All tracks are written by Fred

No.	Title	Length
1.	"October"	4:02
2.	"Djin Djin"	4:29
3.	"Summer's Coming"	3:57
4.	"Wouldn't It Be Gold"	3:39
5.	"Let's Get It Wrong"	2:55
6.	"Here Before"	4:19
7.	"St. Helena"	4:43
8.	"Four Chords and the Truth"	4:44
9.	"Boring"	3:41
10.	"Topography"	3:52
11.	"The Capital Song"	6:28
