= Giveamanakick =

Irish rock music duo from Limerick

- Origin: Castletroy, Limerick, Ireland
- Genres: Noise rock, pop, punk rock
- Years active: 2001–2009, 2015
- Label: Out On A Limb Records / Monkeyheart Recordings
- Members: Stephen Ryan (Steveamanakick); Keith Lawler (Giveamanakeith)

Giveamanakick—typeset as giveamanakick and abbreviated as GAMAK— were an Irish rock music duo from Limerick. The two band members were Stephen Ryan (Steveamanakick), the vocalist and guitarist, and Keith Lawler (Giveamanakeith), the drummer.

Giveamanakick performed regularly in Ireland, toured the United Kingdom with The Undertones and also performed in Germany during their existence. The duo featured at festivals such as Electric Picnic, Indie-pendence and Hard Working Class Heroes and also took part in the 2fm 2moro 2our. They released three albums; Is it ok to be loud, Jesus? (2003), We Are the Way Forward (2005) and Welcome to the Cusp (2008) before the end was announced in August 2009.

Remaining in Limerick throughout the existence of Giveamanakick, the duo were declared "the best hard-rock band in the country" by rock critic Eamon Sweeney and received the approval of Hot Press, No Disco's Leagues O'Toole and Fight Like Apes.

== History ==
Giveamanakick formed in 2001 following the demise of Tooth. Left with several songs, Ryan performed as a solo artist with an electric guitar. One night, he encountered Keith Lawler, who played guitar in another band at the time, and Lawler began drumming with Ryan. In 2002, the duo released a split single with Mr. Creosote titled "Darko Filopovic", a song which would later feature as the final track on their debut album. By 2003, they had supported several more established acts, including Yeah Yeah Yeahs and Rocket from the Crypt. In 2003, there were reports that the duo's debut album, titled Is it ok to be loud, Jesus?, would be released on a label called Larry Gogan Records but this later emerged to be a joke published by a fledgling Foggy Notions. The duo's debut album was in fact published on 3 July 2003 with that same title by the independent label Out On A Limb Records as the label's first release, with Giveamanakick having finished recording it in January that year. It received two out of five stars in a review by RTÉ's Tom Grealis who wrote, "this is what happens when rawness comes without any real sense of purpose". The Hot Press reviewer said listening to the album was "something akin to being battered round the head with a plank of wood for half an hour" but, nonetheless, "bloody fantastic".

A second album, We Are the Way Forward, was recorded over an eight-day period and released by Out On a Limb in 2005. It received three from five stars in a review by RTÉ's Harry Guerin who said: "you'll get what you paid for from their stomp and swing". Phil Udell's Hot Press review gave the album 4.5 out of five stars, saying it "gives you that much sought after visceral thrill" and that the duo "wrote it, recorded it, fucked off. A classic". Their live performances also came in for increasing critical acclaim. When Eamon Sweeney of the Irish Independent attended a show by The Presidents of the United States of America in May 2006, his review stated that they "were well and truly blown off the stage by the support band" who were Giveamanakick. Stephen Ryan has said in several interviews that their early Sunday morning performance at Electric Picnic in 2006 was "one to remember" with so many festival-goers coming to view them. He described the performance as a" bit of a blur" as they "pretty dumbfounded by the reaction" and the idea of "playing with some of our musical heroes such as Dinosaur Jr. and Deftones was a dream come through [sic]".

In 2007, Giveamanakick toured Germany before beginning to record their follow-up album. They did the 2fm 2moro 2our with The Flaws and Messiah J & The Expert. In October that year, rock critic Eamon Sweeney, bemoaning the lack of original Irish music that year, singled out Giveamanakick as " the best hard-rock band in the country" and said they "could teach all those Dublin chancers with stupid haircuts and no ideas a thing or two".

Giveamanakick were described as a "promising act" for 2008 by Eamon Sweeney of the Irish Independent in January of that year. They performed several Irish dates in January that year. Their third album, Welcome to the Cusp, was recorded over a ten-day period in Letterkenny, County Donegal and released on 2 May 2008 on the duo's own label, Monkeyheart Recordings. It received three from five stars in a review by RTÉ's Harry Guerin who described the music as "immediate and memorable". Other publications called it "the best Irish record of 2008". The track "Brittle Bones", released as the second single from the album, marked the first use of an acoustic guitar by the duo. Ryan claimed that Welcome to the Cusp was the album which "most accurately represents what the Giveamanakick sound actually is" and described the songs as "possibly the most structurally challenging ones so far".

Giveamanakick performed a nationwide tour following the release of Welcome to the Cusp, including a date at Indie-pendence in August 2008. Prior to their Friday night performance at Electric Picnic in 2008, Tony Clayton-Lea, writing in The Irish Times, recommended festival-goers to see them, remarking that "despite keeping a profile lower than a Dachshund's belly, Giveamanakick have managed to keep things grooving along by virtue of their innate boisterousness and musical flash-bang-wallop".

In September 2008, Giveamanakick played Hard Working Class Heroes, at which the organisers selected them alongside acts such as The Blizzards and Heathers to play the CMJ Festival in New York City the following month. On 3 April 2009, the duo appeared on Phantom FM alongside Royseven to perform cover versions of Nirvana songs. Giveamanakick's end came with an announcement on 17 August 2009. The final shows are scheduled to take place in Cork, Dublin, Galway and Limerick in November and December 2009.\\ In June 2013, it was announced that giveamanakick were to reform for one night only to celebrate their label's 10th birthday.

== Style ==
The duo were described as "noise rock's version of The Odd Couple" by RTÉ. Ryan once described himself as a "Beastie Boys fanatic" and the duo were compared to acts such as Pixies. His lyrics regularly featured references to popular culture. However, the opening track on their debut album, titled "Ger Canning", was not a reference to the broadcaster of the same name. They wrote self-described pop songs, where "Keith hits his drums really hard and I [Steve Ryan] like my guitars turned up very loud but we do this with a pop sensibility", and employed techniques such as using gas masks to distort their vocals when playing live, performing with streamers and encouraging their audience to disorientate themselves by clapping their own ears. They lived in Limerick throughout their existence, citing a positive music scene, the humour and the hurling as being some of their reasons for liking their home city.

== Members ==
Stephen Ryan was the guitarist and vocalist. He is originally from Castletroy. He grew up in a background of traditional music, listened to The Beatles on his father's record player, learned how to play the keyboard at the age of ten, the guitar at the age of fifteen and joined a band called Tooth in his early twenties. He has also performed as Windings.

Keith Lawler was the drummer. He is from Parteen, County Clare. He liked Nirvana when he was fourteen years of age, and learned how to play the guitar when he was a teenager but began to learn the drums at the age of sixteen when he realised that there was a surplus of guitarists in his area. Tooth used to rehearse near his house and he often listened to them from outside. Two of his cousins were already drummers, having performed with The Charming and The Cranberries.

== Discography ==
Giveamanakick released three albums.

- Is it ok to be loud, Jesus? (2003)
- We Are the Way Forward (2005)
- Welcome to the Cusp (2008)
