= Pustra/Vile-een's Vaudeville =

Background information
- Genres: Cabaret, Music Hall, Comedy
- Years active: 2006–2009
- Members: Performers: Le Pustra,

Pustra/Vile-een's Vaudeville was a comedy duo that performed on the Alternative Cabaret and Neo-Burlesque scene in London, England and abroad from 2006 till 2009. The two were known for their strange stage acts. The duo was a product of the MySpace era and they created their act online, inspired by Silent films and slapstick comedy of the early 1900s – 1930s and continued to use Social Media to reach more and more fans. They were featured in Time Out Magazine's Creatures of The Night article and a press shoot at the Hackney Empire alongside other established and emerging acts. Noted appearances include Electric Picnic 2008 and the show Telling Tales (Too Terrible To Tell).

The pair has been linked to The Tiger Lillies. They also worked with David Mitchell, from Channel 4's Peep Show TV series and performed for Musician, Peaches at the Royal Festival Hall in London.

== Le Pustra ==
Le Pustra is best known as the creative director of the Weimar Cabaret inspired show Kabarett der Namenlosen in Berlin. In 2020 Le Pustra made his television debut in Season 3 of German Crime drama Babylon Berlin. Le Pustra will reprise his role in Season 4.
