= Boa Morte (band) =

Irish alternative folk band

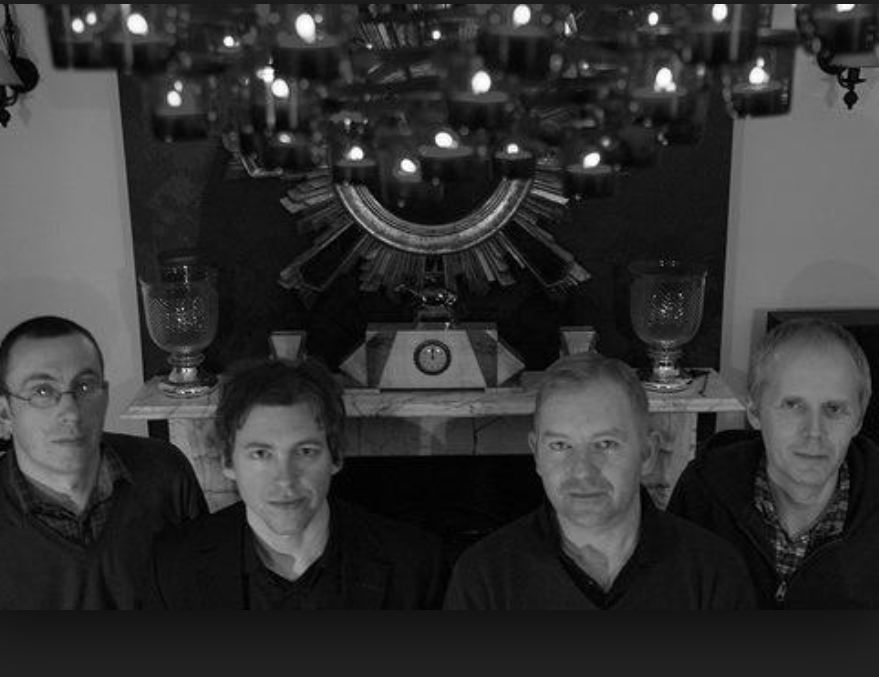

Background information
- Origin: Cork, Ireland
- Genres: alternative folk, contemporary folk, indie rock, slowcore
- Years active: 1998–present
- Labels: Moodfood Records; Shoeshine Records; Kicking A Can Records; Gare Du Nord Records
- Members: Paul Ruxton; Cormac Gahan; Bill Twomey; Maurice Hallissey
- Website: Official website

Boa Morte are an Irish alternative folk and slowcore band formed in Cork in 1998. The line-up consists of Paul Ruxton (vocals, guitar, bass), Cormac Gahan (vocals, guitar, bass, keyboard), Bill Twomey (guitar) and Maurice Hallissey (drums).

They have released five critically acclaimed albums, including 2019's "Before There Was Air". Their fourth album "The Total Space" is due for release in March 2023.

== History ==
Boa Morte formed in Cork, Ireland in 1998. That year, their self-released EP "Passenger, Measure Your Time" generated record company interest, leading to a recording deal with American label Moodfood Records in 1999.

Recording of their debut album was completed in late 2000 with producer Daniel Presley, who had previously worked with The Breeders, however complications with the American deal delayed its release. They were signed by Shoeshine Records in Glasgow, and their July 2002 debut album Soon It Will Come Time to Face the World Outside was released to critical acclaim, including 4-Star reviews in Uncut, Mojo, Q Magazine and The Irish Times. The album was selected for the 2009 Hot Press magazine "250 Greatest Irish Albums Of All Time" list.

During this period, the band played live extensively, including supporting acts such as Teenage Fanclub, Calexico and Howe Gelb, as well as headline shows around Ireland and a UK tour with label-mates The Beauty Shop and Major Matt Mason USA. Boa Morte released their second album The Dial Waltz in 2009 on their Kicking a Can label.

Boa Morte began recording their third album, "Before There Was Air", in September 2018 for the London-based Gare Du Nord label. However it was not released until September 2019. The tracks encompasses ambient and modern composition while maintaining their core sound.

Their fourth album "The Total Space" was released in March 2023, having been preceded by the single Hard To Know.

== Discography ==
=== Albums ===
- "Soon It Will Come Time To Face The World Outside", Shoeshine Records, 2002
- "The Dial Waltz", Kicking A Can Records, 2010
- "Before There Was Air", Gare Du Nord, 2019
- " The Total Space", Gare Du Nord, March 2023
- "Signal:Lost", October 2026

=== Singles ===
- Hard To Know, January 2023
