= The Steady Song =

Single by Republic of Loose featuring Isabel Reyes-Feeney

from the album Vol IV: Johnny Pyro and the Dance of Evil
- Released: 20 June 2008
- Length: 3.13
- Label: Loaded Dice Records
- Producer: Gareth Mannix

"The Steady Song" (2008)
Sample of "The Steady Song"—taken from the 2008 album Vol IV: Johnny Pyro and the Dance of Evil, this is the band's most successful and highest impacting release in the Irish Singles Chart to date.

"The Steady Song" is a 2008 single by the Irish musical ensemble Republic of Loose featuring Isabel Reyes-Feeney. It features on the album Vol IV: Johnny Pyro and the Dance of Evil. When released as a single on 20 June. it spent a total of thirteen weeks in the Irish Singles Chart, climbing as far as number 12 (the band's highest placed entry on the Irish Singles Chart thus far) and receiving steady airplay throughout the summer. amongst the song's live performances have been an appearance on The View and also at Oxegen 2008.

== Chart performance ==
Chart (2008)	Peak position
Irish Singles Chart	12
