= Jinx Lennon =

Irish punk and urban poet (born 1964)

- Born: David Lennon; 20 August 1964 (age 62); Dundalk, County Louth, Ireland
- Genre: Rock music
- Instrument: Vocals

David "Jinx" Lennon (born 20 August 1964 in Dundalk, County Louth, Ireland) is an Irish punk and urban poet. As of Sep 2022, he has released 12 albums with songs on a broad range of themes. He uses a rap-like vocal style, in a heavy Dundalk accent. In October 2016, he released two new albums: Magic Bullets of Madness to Uplift the Grief Magnets and Past Pupil Stay Sane. Lennon says he found himself in a "bind" because he hated the characters he wrote about on a previous album, Trauma Themes, Idiot Times, and that it was too pessimistic.He has no known relation to former Beatle John Lennon.

== Music ==
Lennon's work has been compared to Mark E. Smith and John Cooper Clarke for the "off-beat genius of his lyrics". Themes which have been explored in his music include childhood, poverty inequality, the Celtic Tiger, domestic violence, mental health, loneliness, the importance of self-love, recession, emigration, anti-Irish sentiment, environmentalism, racism, the 2014 Garda whistleblower scandal, the Lisa Smith case as well as wider societal issues affecting the border region, Dundalk and Ireland at large. In 2014, Lennon collaborated with Liverpool punk band Clinic. A year later he contributed to Glór na hAoise - Songs of Solidarity and Resistance, a compilation album of music and poetry celebrating over 15 years of struggle against Shell at the Shell to Sea protest in north County Mayo. Lennon performed at Rock Against Racism in Dundalk on 10 February 2018; an event organised by local artist and activist Sarah Jane Hopkins and supported by the Immigrant Council of Ireland.

== Discography ==
Year	Title
2000	Live at the Spirit Store
2002	Thirty Beacons of Light for a Land Full of Spite Thugs Drug Slugs and Energy Vampires
2006	Know Your Station Gouger Nation!!!
2009	Trauma Themes Idiot Times
2010	National Cancer Strategy
2011	Hungry Bastard Hibernia
2016	Past Pupil Stay Sane
2016	Magic Bullets of Madness to Uplift Grief Magnets
2018	Grow a Pair!!!
2020	Border Schizo Fffolk Songs for the Fuc**d
2021	Liferafts For Latchicos
2022	Pet Rent
2023	Walk Lightly When The Jug Is Full
2025	The Hate Agents Leer At The Last Isle Of Hope
