= The Button Factory =

Music venue in Dublin, Ireland

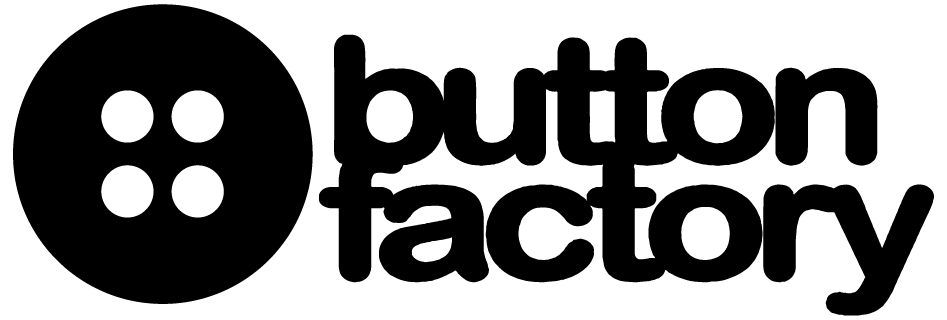
- Interactive map of The Button Factory
- Address: Dublin; Ireland
- Coordinates: 53°20′41.72″N 6°15′52.51″W
- Owner: Nottub Limited
- Capacity: 550
- Event: Music venue

Construction
- Opened: 1996
- Renovated: 2007

Website
- buttonfactory.ie

The Button Factory is a music and arts venue located in Temple Bar, Dublin, Ireland.

== History ==
=== 1990s ===
The venue first opened in 1996 as the Temple Bar Music Centre, founded with the ambition of creating a vibrant cultural home for Irish music as part of Dublin’s Temple Bar district.

=== 2000s ===
Following a major refurbishment by The Design Farm (including a new PA system and increased capacity to 750) the Temple Bar Music Centre was renamed The Button Factory in 2007, its new title referencing the building’s original function as a button‐making factory.

=== 2010s ===
On 5 February 2011, the Button Factory’s operating company, Temple Lane Management Limited, went into examinership with debts driven largely by excessive rents, rates and a dramatic rise in licensing fees from €500 to €500,000 per annum. Despite an interim examiner being appointed, management assured patrons that “business as usual” would continue.

In 2018, the Button Factory, co-owned by Paraic Dunning and Paul Clinton, recorded a profit of €70,000. Clinton had joined the venture in 2017 after loaning €4 million to Nottub Ltd, which purchased the venue from the Temple Bar Cultural Trust. Dunning, who also owns Temple Lane and Grouse Lodge studios, saw retained profits of €100,000 from his recording business.

=== 2020s ===
In January 2020, the owners of the Button Factory, Paraic Dunning and Paul Clinton of Nottub Limited, applied to subdivide the main auditorium to create a smaller, 127.4-square-metre venue upstairs. They argued this would meet growing demand from promoters following closures of venues such as the Tivoli Theatre and Andrews Lane Theatre, and would allow two events to run concurrently, including space for emerging Irish artists. The application warned the venue could face closure if it could not adapt to market conditions, while denying any intent to convert the space into a 'super pub'.

In October 2021, a new club night called Centre Point launched at the Button Factory, coinciding with the easing of COVID-19 restrictions that allowed nightclubs to reopen at full capacity. The organisers described the venture as a revitalisation of one of the city's long-standing music venues, aiming to restore Dublin’s clubbing culture after nearly two years of closures. The opening night featured George FitzGerald and marked the start of a dedicated club space at the venue.

As of the 2020s, the Button Factory comprises three performance spaces: The Main Room (550 capacity), Centrepoint Club and Curveball. It won IMRO’s Dublin Venue of the Year award in 2025.
