= Channel One (band) =

Irish electronic rock band

Channel One are an Irish electronic rock band.

== Formation and history ==
The band formed in 2002 and launched on the live circuit in 2004.

Channel One followed on from their two previous vinyl-only releases of "Not for the Last Time" and "Accelerate:Brake/Fun Radio" with their debut EP, Permissions in February 2007. The self-financed release was written, recorded and produced by the band in the Autumn 2006. It was due to be distributed through Sound Foundation Recordings.

Channel One played support to Hard-Fi at The Olympia on 9 April 2008 as part of the Bud Rising series of concerts in Dublin.

== Discography ==
| Year | Album | Label |
|---|---|---|
| 2009 | Sound to Light | SFR |
| 2007 | Permissions EP | SFR |
| 2006 | "Accelerate; Brake (single)" | SFR |
| 2006 | Violation EP | SFR |
