= Pod Concerts =

Pod Concerts is a music promoter operating in Ireland. It co-operates with Festival Republic in organising Electric Picnic. It has been behind numerous events and festivals on the island, including Lovebox, Garden Party and Midlands Music Festival. In 2008, Pod have been behind the Soundtrack '08 event in their Pod Complex on Dublin's Harcourt Street, as well as promoting a number of concerts involving Leonard Cohen, Iggy & The Stooges and Morrissey at the Royal Hospital, Kilmainham in June.

== 2008 IMRO legal proceedings ==
A disagreement between the Irish Music Rights Organisation and POD Concerts reached the High Court on June 16, 2008. IMRO began proceedings against POD Concerts seeking €432,000 in fees, which are alleged to be outstanding on a series of music festivals, including Electric Picnic, Lovebox and Garden Party. POD concerts intend to dispute the basis on which the tariffs are calculated and how they are distributed.

On Friday 13 June, IMRO issued a statement confirming that it had issued proceedings against POD Concerts Ltd. The proceedings were "in relation to a dispute in respect of the Electric Picnic music element". "IMRO will be in court on Monday 16 June 2008 seeking entry into the Commercial List," the statement added, before clarifying the background to the organisation's decision to go to court. "It is IMRO's policy to rigorously pursue all outstanding royalties due to the songwriters, composers and music publishers that it represents from the commercial exploitation of their music."

Following the 17 June hearing, in which lawyers on behalf of IMRO made their opening statement, POD Concerts responded to media coverage of the dispute, setting out their version of events in robust terms – and directly answering what POD dismisses as totally misleading statements about Electric Picnic. The statement, issued on 18 June and signed by POD MD, John Reynolds, asserted the following:

"The Electric Picnic 2008 is not in doubt or in jeopardy contrary to press and media reports over the last number of days. POD Concerts is in dispute with IMRO over certain issues relating to the high fees charged by IMRO to it for 'public performance' of music which are in addition to the fees paid to the artists to perform. IMRO is seeking to charge POD Concerts for performances from non-music artists involved in the Electric Picnic."

The case may have to go to a full hearing in early July when it is due in the High Court again.
