= Telepathe =

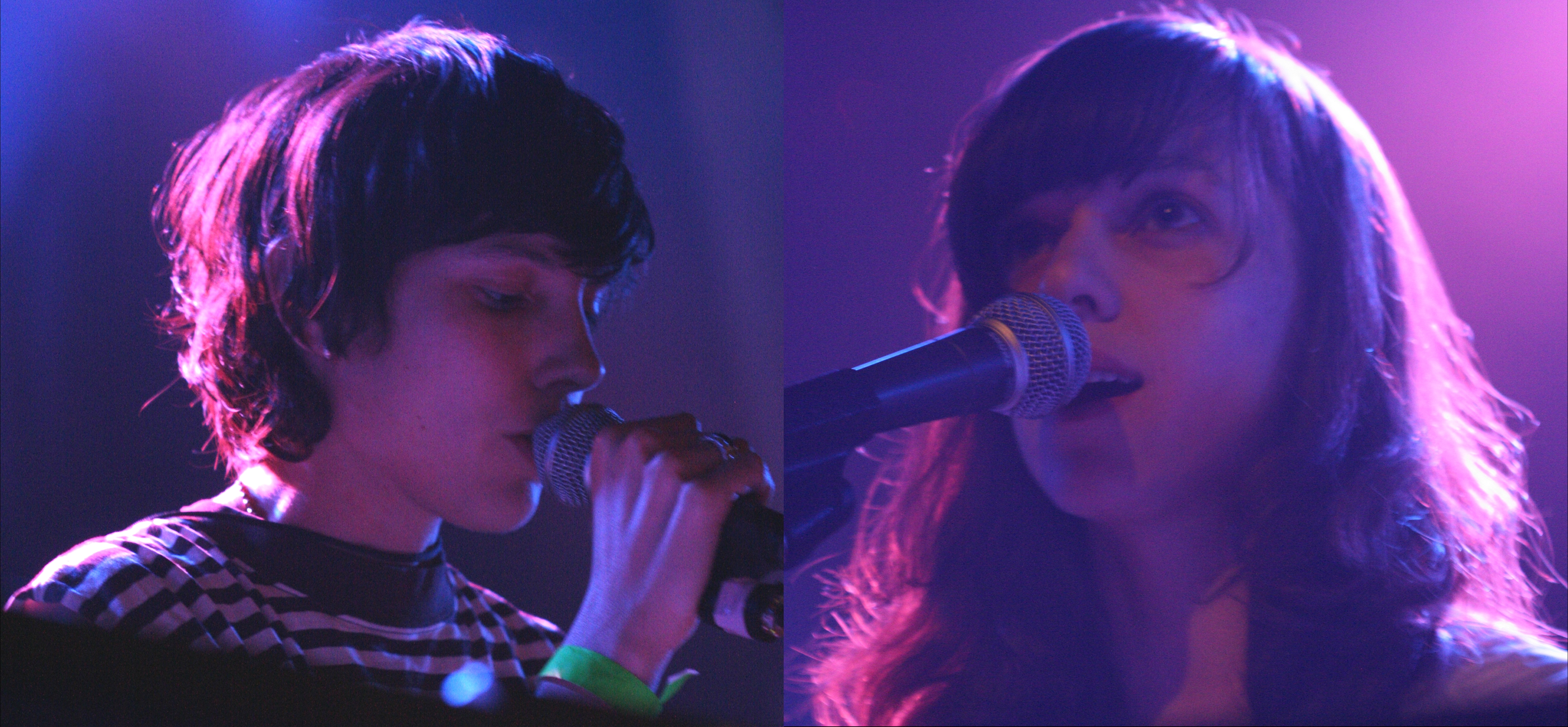
- Photomontage of Telepathe's Melissa Livaudais and Busy Gangnes at Metro Chicago in 2009

Background information
- Origin: Brooklyn, New York, U.S.
- Genres: Experimental rock, synthpop, electronic
- Years active: 2009–present
- Labels: Federal Prism, The Social Registry, IAMSOUND
- Members: Busy Gangnes; Melissa Livaudais
- Website: myspace.com/telepathe

Telepathe (pronounced telepathy and meant with some literal meaning) are an electronic pop duo from Brooklyn consisting of core members Busy Gangnes and Melissa Livaudais. The band also includes other occasional musicians, such as Ryan Lucero.

Telepathe has toured with the Strokes' frontman Julian Casablancas, in addition to friend DJ Diplo, Ladytron and The Faint. Their 2009 debut album, Dance Mother, was produced by TV on the Radio's David Sitek.

== Discography ==
Studio albums

- Dance Mother (2009)
- Destroyer (2015)

EPs

- Farewell Forest EP (2006)
- Sinister Militia EP (2007)
- Chrome's On It EP (2008)

Singles

- "Throw Away This / Destroyer" (2011)

Remixes

- TV on the Radio - "Crying" (2008)
- Dan le sac vs Scroobius Pip - "Cauliflower" (2010)
- Scott Hardkiss - "You & I" (2010)
- Planningtorock - "The Breaks" (2011)
