= Big September =

Five-piece Irish band

Big September (previously Peakin' Trippers) were a five-piece band from Bray, County Wicklow in Ireland. As of 2007, the band was made up of Scott O'Neill on vocals, Cillian Duane on guitar, Shay Fogarty on bass, Dan Smith on drums and Dave Butler on vocals and guitar. The group disbanded in late 2014.

== History ==
=== Formation ===
Formed as "Peakin' Trippers" while the members of the group were still in secondary school, they released a single in September 2008. The single, "Tin Tin", reached number 45 in the Irish singles charts in early September 2008.

As of 2009, the band were reportedly working on an album with Gareth Manix which was due to be titled "6 Pieces of Gold". In 2010, they won two heats in the Hot Press "Tiger Untamed" competition, before losing to Annebrook in the final.

The Peakin' Trippers played at events in their home town of Bray, including at Bray's "Summerfest" in 2010 and Presentation Bray's rugby festival in 2011.

=== Name change ===
The band changed their name to "Big September" and made some changes to their line-up, before performing on The Late Late Show in 2013. A new single, Moneyman, reached number 24 in the Irish singles charts for one week in September 2013.

An album, Ballroom Addicts, was released in 2014 and reached number one on Ireland's Independent Album Charts and number six in the Official Album Charts. They played a charity concert in September 2014, before disbanding after a farewell gig in early December 2014.
