= Happy the Man (Guggenheim Grotto album) =

Studio album by The Guggenheim Grotto
- Released: October 21, 2008
- Genre: Folk; Alternative rock
- Length: 36:21
- Label: UFO Music

The Guggenheim Grotto chronology
Tigers (2008)	Happy the Man (2008)	The Universe Is Laughing (2010)

Happy the Man is the second full-length album from the Dublin, Ireland folk-pop band The Guggenheim Grotto. It was originally released on October 21, 2008 by the New York-based indie label United For Opportunity.

== Track listing ==
1. "Intro" - 0:58
2. "Fee Da Da Dee" - 3:37
3. "Her Beautiful Ideas" - 4:17
4. "Everyman" - 3:22
5. "Sunshine Makes Me High" - 4:14
6. "The Girl With the Cards" - 3:42
7. "Just Not Just" - 4:02
8. "Nikita" - 3:54
9. "From the Attic" - 1:07
10. "Lost Forever And" - 2:50
11. "The Dragon" - 2:59
12. "Heaven Has a Heart" - 3:59
