= The Brilliant Trees =

Irish rock band

The Brilliant Trees are an Irish rock band from Dublin. Formed in 1989 the band consists of Alan Hoey (lead vocals guitar), Tony Barrett (guitar), Sid Barrett (bass) and Dave Farrell (drums). In 1998 the band were joined by keyboard player Dave Morrissey. Dave Farrell quit the band in 2002.

== Information ==
Their first single "Home" was released in 1993. In 1996 their second single "Don't waste your Talent" received huge radio play and allowed the band to play to a much bigger audience. Their debut LP Friday Night was also released in 1996. The band toured the United States from 1997 to 2000 and recorded their second album, Wake up and Dream at Triclops Studios in Atlanta, Georgia in 1998. The EP Let it all go was recorded in New Jersey in 1999 and released in 2000. The band toured Germany in 2002 and released the LP Like you A lot Love you a Little in 2002. They took a break for five years but got back together for a reunion gig in April 2007.

The band continued to write together in the intervening years. In 2016 they released "I Know I Know", and played two sold out shows at the Grand Social Dublin.

Also in 2016 the band's complete back catalogue became available on iTunes. A new LP is planned for early 2017, as well as a support slot to Aslan in the Iveagh Gardens.

== Discography ==
=== Albums ===
- "Friday Night" (1996)
- Wake Up and Dream (1998)
- Like You A Lot, Love You A Little (2002)

=== Singles/EP's ===
- "Home (1993)
- "Talent (1996)
- Heartstrings (1997) EP
- "Dance To Your Persuasion" (1998)
- Let It all Go (2000) EP
- "Heartstrings" (2002)"
- "I Know I Know " (2016)
- " Summer Song " (2017)
