= Fred (band) =

Irish alternative band

- Origin: Cork, Ireland
- Genres: Indie, Pop
- Years active: 1998–2013
- Labels: RCM Music, United For Opportunity, Faction Records, Sparks Music
- Members: Joseph O'Leary; Jamie Hanrahan; Jamin O'Donovan; Justin O'Mahony
- Past members: Eibhlín O'Gorman; Emmett Christie; Carolyn Goodwin; Liam O'Connor

Fred were a five-piece Irish Indie band from Cork. They released four albums, the last of which, Leaving My Empire, was released in 2011.

== Career ==
The Fred EP was released in 2000. A debut album, Can't Stop, I'm Being Timed, was released in 2002. The single "October", released in 2004, was taken from their second album. Two follow-up singles taken from the album were released in 2005: "Summer's Coming" and "Four Chords and the Truth".

Their self-financed third album, Go God Go, was released on 30 May 2008 and via United For Opportunity in the U.S. in 2009. The album was recorded in Love Tap Studios in Ireland and mixed by Mark Wallis in London. It spent a total of two weeks on the Ireland Albums Top 75, climbing as far as No. 30 in the Irish Albums Chart. The singles, "Skyscrapers" (released 16 May 2008) and "Running" (released 8 August 2008) received a significant amount of airplay on national radio during the summer of 2008. A third single from the album, "The Lights", was released in Ireland on 14 November 2008. Fred performed at a number of Irish festivals including Electric Picnic 2008 and Hard Working Class Heroes. They played their debut show in Canada at NXNE in June 2008 and played at Pop Montreal and the Halifax Pop Explosion to support their Go God Go album's release in Canada in October.

On 20 January 2009, thousands of euro worth of equipment owned by the band was stolen from their van parked across from Anglesea Garda Station in Cork, just as the band were to begin a North American tour. The missing gear was recovered within 48 hours. The following week, Fred appeared on The Cafe on 30 January 2009, where reference was made to the incident and it was explained that the "amateur" thieves had attempted to pawn the instruments only to be foiled by leaving their addresses in the shop. The band played their single "Good One" on Tubridy Tonight on 21 March 2009.

On 11 April 2011 the band streamed their new album Leaving My Empire on SoundCloud. The album, released in Ireland on Friday, 15 April 2011, went straight into the Irish Album charts at No. 23, and The Indie charts at No. 10. The Irish press received the record with high praise, with State Magazine calling it "A burst of Technicolor glory", Irish Independent describing it as "Sprawling, ambitious and intoxicating", Heineken Music calling it "A joy to behold", and Hot press stating the album "has seen them ascend to a new level of brilliance". In August 2011, "We Are The City Now" was used in a national Canadian commercial for TBooth Wireless.

== Members ==
- Joseph O'Leary - Vocals
- Jamie Hanrahan - Guitar
- Jamin O'Donovan - Bass
- Justin O'Mahony - Drums

== Discography ==
=== Studio albums ===
Year	Album details	Peak chart positions	
Year	Album details	IRL	UK
2002	Can't Stop, I'm Being Timed: Released: 2002; Label: Formats: CD	—	—
2005	Making Music So You Don't Have To: Released: 2005; Label: Formats: CD	70	—
2008	Go God Go: Released: May, 2008; Label: RCM, United For Opportunity, Sparks Music; Formats: CD	30	—
2011	Leaving My Empire: Released: 15 April 2011; Label: RCM; Formats: CD, Download	23	
"—" denotes releases that did not chart or were not released in that territory.

=== Singles ===
Year	Title	Chart positions	Album
Year	Title	IRL	Album
2004	"October"	–	Making Music So You Don't Have To
2005	"Four Chords And The Truth"	–	Making Music So You Don't Have To
2005	"Summer's Coming"	–	Making Music So You Don't Have To
2008	"Skyscraper"	–	Go God Go
2008	"Running"	–	Go God Go
2008	"The Lights"	–	Go God Go
2009	"Good One"	–	Go God Go
2010	"Trial By Fire"	–	Leaving My Empire
2011	"If Not Now When"	–	Leaving My Empire
"—" denotes a title that did not chart, or was not released in that territory.

=== Extended plays ===
Year	Album details
2000	FRED: Released: 2000; Label: None; Format: CD

== Awards ==
In January 2009, the band were nominated in the Hope for 2009 category at the Meteor Music Awards. They lost to Wallis Bird at the ceremony on 17 March 2009.

Year	Nominee / work	Award	Result
2009	Fred	Meteor Music Award – Hope for 2009	Nominated
