= The Guggenheim Grotto =

Musical band

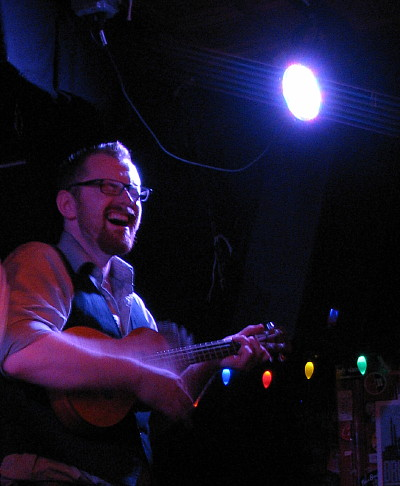
- Mick Lynch of Guggenheim Grotto

Background information
- Origin: County Mayo, Ireland
- Genres: Folk-pop
- Years active: 2003–2013
- Labels: United For Opportunity
- Members: Kevin May, Mick Lynch
- Past members: Shane Power

The Guggenheim Grotto is a folk-pop band from, County Mayo, Ireland. The members of The Guggenheim Grotto are Kevin May from Ballinrobe, and Mick Lynch from Dublin. Guggenheim Grotto has a unique sound, characterized by an emphasis on piano instrumentals supporting their harmonies. Partridge of the Hartford Courant described their style as "folk-influenced indie-pop" and said it fit well with other music popular on college and public radio, such as Rufus Wainwright, Crowded House, and Kings of Convenience. The music varies from rock, to pop, folk, and even soul. Their influences include Leonard Cohen and Tom Waits, although that is not immediately apparent from their sound.

== History ==
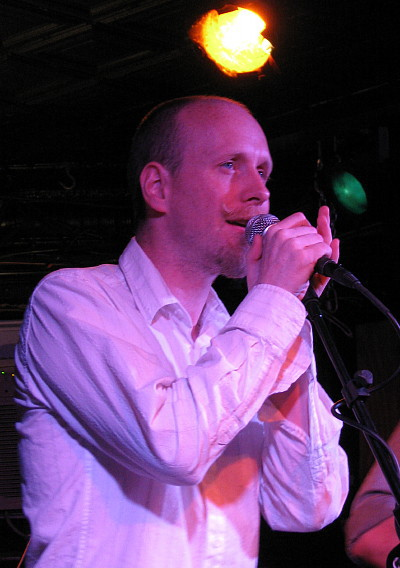
Kevin May of Guggenheim Grotto performing at The Saint in Asbury Park, NJ, US on 6 July 2012.

Kevin May, Shane Power and Mick Lynch all participated in the Dublin music scene that produced musicians like Glen Hansard. May and Lynch have been playing as a duo since 2003. In 2004 they approached Power, a musician and producer with a successful studio, about editing their self-recorded A Lifetime in Heat EP. Power was impressed with their work, and later joined the group as their drummer and also produced their next album. All three play multiple instruments.

The Guggenheim Grotto was well received when they came to the United States in 2006. In 2006, and again in 2009, the band performed at SXSW. The band's debut album ...Waltzing Alone was self-released to immediate critical acclaim in Ireland on 9 September 2005, and their first promotional single Told You So rapidly climbed to No. 12 on the Irish National Airplay Chart. They released ...Waltzing Alone in the U.S. on New York-based new model indie label United For Opportunity on 26 September 2006, and in November of that year embarked on their first U.S. national tour. The band has since completed four U.S. tours.

Early in 2007, The Guggenheim Grotto's A Lifetime in Heat won The 6th Annual Independent Music Award for Best Folk/Singer-Songwriter Song. Songs from their first album have been used in major network prime-time TV shows like One Tree Hill and Brothers And Sisters, and the album received positive reviews from U.S. national publications like Paste Magazine, as well as regional press like The Boston Globe and The Washington Post.

The band's second album, Happy the Man, was released digitally for a limited time in the U.S. and Ireland on 7 October 2008. Former member Shane Power's studio experience has been credited with giving the album its more expansive, experimental sound. On Happy The Guggenheim Grotto's sound is more akin to Simon & Garfunkel, The Beatles, and Leonard Cohen. Intricate acoustic guitar work is the centerpiece for most tracks. The sound is more like Crowded House than Jack Johnson, with electronic influences reminiscent of Radiohead. The album reached No. 1 on the U.S. iTunes Folk Chart. The CD was released to stores 27 January 2009, and the band toured nationally to support it.

The Universe Is Laughing, which Lynch and May recorded themselves, was released in 2010. As of early 2012, the duo was working on a new album that will have a bigger, more band-oriented sound than Universe, with money they raised from fans through the website PledgeMusic.com.

In September 2013, the band announced that they had signed to Ingrid Michaelson's record label Cabin 24 and Secret Road Music Services and changed their name to Storyman.

== Line-up ==
- Kevin May – vocals, guitar, keyboards
- Mick Lynch – vocals, guitar, bass
- Shane Power – Drums, Percussion, keyboards

== Discography ==
- A Lifetime in Heat (EP) (2004)
- ...Waltzing Alone
  - 9 September 2005 – Ireland release
  - 26 September 2006 – U.S./Canada release (United For Opportunity)
- Told You So (EP) (January 2007)
- Tigers (EP) (September 2008)
- Happy the Man
  - 5 September 2008 – Ireland release
  - 27 January 2009 – U.S./Canada release (United For Opportunity)
- The Universe Is Laughing (15 June 2010) (United For Opportunity)
