= Dance Mother =

Studio album by Telepathe
- Released: January 26, 2009
- Length: 42:10
- Label: IAMSOUND, Cooperative (UK)
- Producer: Dave Sitek, Dan Hurron

Telepathe chronology
Chrome's On It EP (2008)	Dance Mother (2009)

Dance Mother is the debut album of the synthpop duo Telepathe. It was released on January 26, 2009 via IAMSOUND Records and Cooperative Records. The album was produced by Dave Sitek of TV on the Radio.

The US releases of the album contain 3 extra tracks: So Fine (Chairlift remix), Devil's Trident (The Big Pink Specialization Reality) and Michael (Atticus Ross remix).

Music videos for "So Fine" and "Chrome's On It" were produced.

Professional ratings
Aggregate scores
Source	Rating
Metacritic	(70/100)
Review scores
Source	Rating
Allmusic	3.5/5 stars
Drowned in Sound	(8/10)
The Guardian	3/5 stars
NME	(7/10)
Pitchfork	(6.7/10)

== Track listing ==
All tracks are written by Telepathe.

No.	Title	Length
1.	"So Fine"	3:29
2.	"Chrome’s On It"	4:12
3.	"Devil’s Trident"	4:24
4.	"In Your Line"	4:29
5.	"Lights Go Down"	4:48
6.	"Can’t Stand It"	6:12
7.	"Michael"	4:10
8.	"Trilogy: Breath Of Life, Crimes And Killings, Threads And Knives"	6:59
9.	"Drugged"	3:03
Total length:		48:10

Bonus tracks for US releases
No.	Title	Length
14.	"So Fine (Chairlift remix)"	5:09
15.	"Devil's Trident (The Big Pink Specialization Reality)"	6:36
16.	"Michael (Atticus Ross remix)"	5:30
Total length:		59:27

== Personnel ==
Credits for Dance Mother adapted from Discogs:

- Telepathe - writing, performances and arranging
- Dave Sitek - bass synth (6), bass guitar (7), production (2–8)
- Chris Coady - engineering (2–8), mixing (2–8)
- Matthew Denny - mastering
- Dan Hurron - production (1, 9), engineering (1, 9), mixing (1,9), backing vocals (1)
- Ryan Lucero - bass guitar (6), guitar (7, 8)
- Eric Emm - guitar (2), drums (2), additional recording (3, 8)
- Stuart Bogie - saxophone (3, 8)
- Aaron Johnston - trombone (3, 8)
- Jessie Gold - backing vocals (4, 7)
- Judith Townsend - backing vocals (3)
- Shannon Funchess - backing vocals (4)
- Kyp Malone - backing vocals (8)
- April Christine Chalpara - styling
- Lauren Wilder Dillard - styling
- Saam Farahmand - cover artwork
- Claire Lin - design
- Andreas Lazslo Konrath - photography
