= Le Galaxie =

- Origin: Dublin, Ireland,
- Genres: electropop., Synthpop
- Years active: 2008–2019
- Labels: Universal Music Ireland, The Delphi Label, Red River

Le Galaxie were an electronic music band based in Dublin, Ireland. Their debut album Laserdisc Nights II was released in 2011, followed in 2012 by Fade to Forever EP and the single "Love System", which was nominated for the Choice Music Prize 'Song of the Year' They announced the end of the band via Twitter in December 2019.

Le Galaxie signed to Universal Music Ireland in January 2015, releasing their second album Le Club (mixed in Los Angeles by former DFA Records house engineer Eric Broucek) on 24 April 2015.

Since 2015, the publishing interest of Le Galaxie’s catalog has been represented by Reservoir Media Management.

== In popular culture ==
Le Galaxie were referenced in the Blindboy Boatclub short story "The Batter" in which they were described as playing a secret show in the Grand Social venue, banging pots and pans and doing Fleetwood Mac covers.

== Background and history ==
The band was formed in Dublin by Michael Pope, David McGloughlin, Anthony Hyland and Alastair Higgins, all four having previously played in guitar-based alternative rock band 66e.

They played their first show as Le Galaxie in The Boom Boom Room in 2008, followed by regular sets in Whelan's, Crawdaddy and the Button Factory. As the band's audience grew, Le Galaxie's reputation as a live act has seen them headline Irish festivals such as Sea Sessions, Body & Soul Music Festival and Castlepalooza, and have performed at Secret Garden Party, The Great Escape Festival, Midem, Electric Picnic, SXSW, CMJ, Europavox and Longitude Festival.

In 2016, they announced a string of European dates at festivals such as Lovebox and Fiberfib-Benicassim. They were also announced as tour support for Faithless.

In August 2017, MayKay, formerly of the band Fight Like Apes, joined the band Dave McGloughlin left the band in July 2019 and released his debut solo recording in October 2019 under the moniker "Fakenamé".

The band announced their indefinite hiatus in December 2019 on Instagram at which time a series of national news articles celebrated their career as "Ireland’s premier partystarters of the last 10 years".

== Personnel ==
- Michael Pope - lead vocals, keyboards, drums
- Anthony Hyland - keyboards, guitar
- Alastair Higgins - drums

Former Members:

- David McGloughlin - bass, keyboards

== Discography ==
=== Studio albums ===
Title	Album details	Peak chart positions
Title	Album details	IRL
Laserdisc Nights II	Released: 10 June 2011; Label: Battlepulse Records; Formats: Digital download	-
Le Club	Released: 1 May 2015; Label: Universal Music Ireland; Formats: CD, Vinyl, Digital download	8
Pleasure	Released: 6 April 2018; Label: Red River; Formats: CD, Vinyl, Digital download	-
"—" denotes a recording that did not chart or was not released in that territory.

=== Extended plays ===
- Transworld - (2009) - Self Release
- Fade 2 Forever - (2012) - Delphi Label

=== Singles ===
- "We Bleed The Blood Of Androids" - (2008) - Self-released
- "You Feel The Fire!" - (2009) - Self-released
- "Love System (feat Elaine Mai)" - (2012) - Delphi Label
- "The Nightcaller (feat. Laura Smyth)" - (2012) - Delphi Label
- "Le Club" - (2015) - Universal Music Ireland
- "Pleasure" - (2017) - Red River
