= The Lights =

- Origin: Seattle, WA
- Genres: Alternative rock
- Years active: 1998–present
- Label: Wantage USA
- Members: Craig Chambers; PJ Rogalski; Jeff Albertson

The Lights are an independent rock band from Seattle, WA formed in 1998. They mainly tour in the Pacific Northwest, especially in and around Seattle. Their last national tour was their West Coast tour in the fall of 2006. They made KEXP's Top 90.3 of 2006 and were the winners of The Stranger's 2004 "Best Band in Seattle" contest. Guitarist and vocalist Craig Chambers also plays guitar for Love Tan. Drummer PJ Rogalski also plays for Unnatural Helpers. Local Seattle newspaper The Stranger called them "one of this city's top eclectic-sounding talents."

== Members ==
- Craig Chambers – vocals, guitar
- PJ Rogalski – drums
- Jeff Albertson – bass, vocals

== Discography ==
- The Lights (EP) (Spring 2003)
- Beautiful Bird (CD) (Summer 2003) Bop Tart Records
- Wood and Wire (EP) (2004) Childstar Records
- Suge Knight Sweetheart (7" Single) (2005) Childstar Records
- Diamonds and Dirt (2006) CD Wantage USA and LP [the Swingline]
- Failed Graves (2010) LP Wantage USA
