= Michael O'Toole =

Irish musician

Michael O'Toole is an Irish classical guitarist.

== Education ==
O'Toole studied for many years with John Feeley at the Dublin Institute of Technology (DIT) Conservatory of Music and Drama, Dublin and also spent two years studying with the renowned Cuban virtuoso Ricardo Iznaola in Denver, Colorado.

He holds a master's degree in performance from University College Cork and a PhD from the DIT Conservatory.

== Career ==
O'Toole has performed extensively throughout Ireland, America and the United Kingdom, and has performed several times on national radio and television.

He has worked with Irish composers Eric Sweeney, Jerome de Bromhead, David Fennessy and Ian Wilson, and has performed in ensemble with the Opera Theatre Company, the RTÉ Concert Orchestra, the Dublin Guitar Quartet and RTÉ National Symphony Orchestra.

He is/was artistic director of The Waltons International Guitar Festival and the "Chord" Ennis International Music Festival, and was also on the board of directors of the prestigious Kilkenny Arts Festival. O'Toole was on the faculty of The Royal Irish Academy of Music and the Music Department at Waterford Institute of Technology.
