= Go God Go (album) =

Studio album by Fred
- Released: May 2008
- Label: Sparks Music (Canada)

Fred chronology
Making Music So You Don't Have To (2005)	Go God Go (2008)

Singles from Go God Go
- 1. "Skyscrapers" Released: 2008; 2. "Running" Released: 2008; 3. "The Lights" Released: 14 November 2008; 4. "Good One" Released: 2009

Go God Go is the third studio album of Fred. The singles "Skyscrapers" and "Running" were played across Irish radio, and "Good One" was performed on Tubridy Tonight on 21 March 2009. "Skyscrapers" was named iTunes Canada's "Single of the Week" in October 2008.

== Track listing ==
All tracks are written by Fred.

No.	Title	Length
1.	"Skyscrapers"
2.	"Running"
3.	"The Lights"
4.	"Keep Me Clear"
5.	"Good One"
6.	"Death Song"
7.	"Damn You Hollywood"
8.	"Evergreen"
9.	"We Should Keep On"
10.	"The Lights Are with Us"
11.	"Fear"
12.	"Just Because We Can"

== Release history ==
Country	Date
Ireland	May 2008
Canada	February 2009
