= Out on a Limb Records =

Out On A Limb
- Founded: 2003
- Founder: Albert Twomey; Richard Bourke
- Genre: Alternative
- Country of origin: Ireland
- Location: Limerick
- Official website: outonalimbrecords.com

Out On A Limb Records is an independent record label, based in Limerick, Ireland. It is one of the longest running independent labels in Ireland. The label was set up in the summer of 2003 with the release of Is it OK to be loud, Jesus?, the debut album from local band giveamanakick. It was set up by Albert Twomey (also see Plugd Records) and Richard Bourke, both of whom were involved in the Aspersion Music Collective, a non-profit gig promoter in Limerick. They were joined by Ciarán Ryan a couple of months after that, and the three have worked on the label ever since. In November 2009 it was announced that Twomey would no long be involved in the label. Ryan has admitted that himself and Bourke considered ending the label on a few occasions. In 2013 the Windings album 'I am not the Crow' was nominated for the Choice Music Prize, becoming the first release from the label to receive this nomination.
