= Katie Kim (Irish musician) =

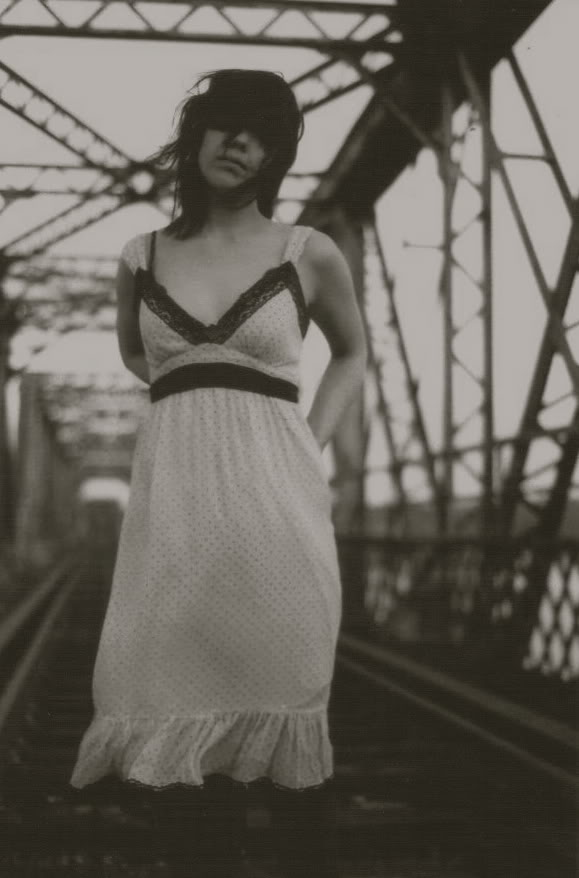
- Kim in Waterford, Ireland in 2008

Background information
- Birth name: Katie Sullivan
- Born: 16 March 1983 (age 42); London, England
- Origin: Dublin, Ireland
- Genres: Indie folk, lo-fi, ambient, alternative rock
- Occupation(s): Musician, singer-songwriter, composer
- Instrument(s): Vocals, guitar, bass piano, keyboards
- Years active: 2008–present
- Labels: Flaming June

Katie Sullivan (born 16 March 1983), also known as Katie Kim, is an Irish musician, singer-songwriter, multi instrumentalist and composer.

== Early life and Dae Kim ==
Born in London to Irish parents, Katie's family, including her two older sisters, moved back to Ireland in 1986 to a southern Irish town called Waterford. Finding school uninspiring, she moved out of home at age 16 and started playing solo shows with her guitar in between jobs. In 2005 she then met Terry Cullen, former drummer with Irish Band Ten Speed Racer and the two started the band Dae Kim. Their debut album 'Matador' was released in November 2005. Their music has been described as "a collection of sounds falling somewhere between the lush dramatics of low, galaxy 500 and the layered guitar genius of slowdive and my bloody valentine, mellow slow building walls of noise interspersed with some very sultry vocals and acoustic tracks". Dae Kim broke up in 2007. She now lives in Dublin.

== Music releases / Katie Kim 2008-2022 ==
After a computer mishap, where over 50 of her songs were wiped from existence, she decided to start again and started recording her debut album Twelve in her then home in Waterford. Twelve was released in 2008 and received high praise upon its release. Donal Dineen, a much loved Irish radio presenter, filmmaker and champion of alternative music, played the first single 'Radio' on his late night Small Hours show, which in turn, garnered many new fans of Katie Kim's music. "Gloomy, sad, dark and beautiful. Katie Kim's first album is an atmospheric tour de force. It is a mix of ambient instrumentals, dark lo fi tracks and a few monochrome anthems. A huge strength of the album is that it doesn't sound like too many other records and as a result leaves a lasting impression."

She then released Vaults digitally through her bandcamp page and on limited cassette in 2010. An album consisting of home made demos with a lo-fi approach.

Over the next two years, she would record Cover & Flood in a small studio in Waterford with John Haggis, her then boyfriend and co-producer. This became a double vinyl release and cemented her name in the Irish music catalogue. An Irish Times article writes, "Her position in the commercial scheme of things might be close to nowhere but musically she's in a league of her own. Cover & Flood is filled with the kind of incandescent light that can make your world a brighter place. All 20 songs are beguiling hymns of ghostly provenance. There's a consistency of temperature and tone that only the very best records possess. It's an emotional landscape with a unique atmosphere."

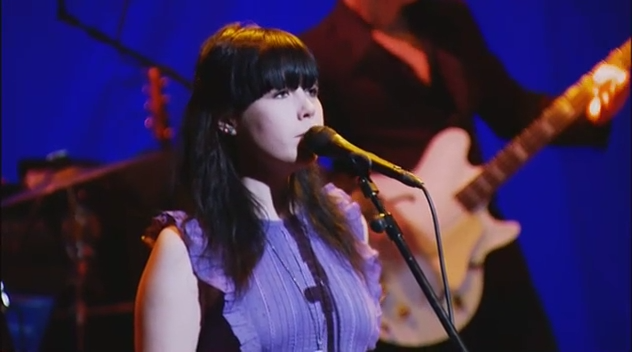
Kim performing with The Waterboys in 2010

Salt was recorded with long time friend, band mate and well known Irish producer John 'Spud' Murphy after she moved to Dublin in Guerrilla Studios, a recording / practice space for bands set up by Murphy with the help of Kim and friends. She says, "It was definitely more organic than contrived. I wanted to veer away from the more lo fidelity approaches I had taken previously and try my hand at something a little more sophisticated, but it was really a case of seeing how it progressed as we (myself and John Murphy) went along.I always have grandiose arrangements playing in my head when recording but it’s difficult to achieve when I’m recording alone with the software I have and in my particular surroundings. I knew I couldn’t afford an orchestra! But I sort of fell in love with the synthetic sound I was getting from the strings that I was playing on various synths or keyboards. They took on their own life and charm the more time I spent with them so I was almost happy that we didn’t have the luxury of real strings in the end. With vocals, it’s always difficult to tell myself when to stop because it’s the most enjoyable element of the recording process for me so I tend to overboard and then have to strip back. Or not in most cases." A reviewer writes "If Kim’s debut Twelve was a lo-fi warning of what was to come, and her sophomore outing Cover & Flood was a sprawling epic, than Salt is unflinching precision. From the opening distorted pounding textures of ‘Ghosts’ to the slow-motion suspended repose of ‘Body Breaks’ Katie Kim has honed her sound down to an exact art. The music lingers, but never outstays its welcome while the atmospheres around it build into a dreamlike stasis that Kim maintains from beginning to end." A live version of the album, rearranged and reworked with Crash Ensemble was then released in 2018. They performed this in its entirety to sold-out audiences around Ireland between 2016 and 2018.

She moved to New York in 2019. But when the pandemic hit globally, she was forced to return to Ireland. She released Charles / VVII in 2020. A collection, she describes as "soundscapes, forgotten demos, field recordings and experiments collected from 2012 - 2020. Arranged as one 29 minute piece, these are not shiny nor pristine but raw form, thoughts and ideas I didn't want to leave behind."

Kim released her seventh album Hour of the Ox in September 2022. This album was again recorded with long time collaborator and friend John Spud Murphy over a period of 2 years in Guerrilla Studios with Kim recording all her vocals at home first. Mostly recorded before she left for New York, this album was much more ambitious sonically with live strings and synthesiser orchestras. When asked for her influences in an interview, she cites, "When asked for specifics, it doesn’t take much to get Kim’s currents of knowledge flowing. She names Harmony Korine, David Lynch and John Carpenter as her “all-time favorite” directors that helped inform her latest album, Hour of the Ox, released last September. When I acknowledge my familiarity with Korine’s Kids, she shows that her undercurrents run deeper, pronouncing “Gummo and Julian Donkey Boy” her primary influences from Korine.Regarding the soundtrack composition, Kim cites Lynne Ramsay’s You Were Never Really Here, Jonathan Glazer’s Under the Skin and pronounces herself a “huge fan” of Mica Levy, specifically the Jackie soundtrack. In terms of the former: “I took the string element from the Under the Skin soundtrack where there were a lot of bending strings. They sound like [it’s] raining, and I got into the bending of strings.”

She directed both Music Videos for the singles from Hour of the Ox, Mona and Eraser.

She has also composed a film score, an original soundtrack for The Seashell and the Clergyman. Commissioned by the Cork French Film Festival, Kim performed the score at the Pavilion, Cork in front of a live audience, where renowned director Agnès Varda attended.

She has worked with various musicians and bands, including Lankum, Halves, Mike Scott and The Waterboys, David Kitt, Ed Harcourt.

== ØXN ==
In 2018 Radie Peat, a member of Lankum and Katie Kim collaborated on a one night only live show of songs about murder, revenge and lust. These were mostly traditional songs, reworked and rearranged. This show was then recorded in the studio along with John 'Spud' Murphy and Eleanor Myler during the global lockdown, in Hellfire Studios in the Wicklow Mountains and ØXN was formed. They were signed by Claddagh Records and the album CYRM was released in 2023.

== Sound ==
Katie Kim performs atmospheric alternative folk rock music as a solo project, using a loop station to layer voices and atmospherics and plays both classical and electric guitar, keyboards and bass guitar. Present band members are John 'Spud' Murphy on synthesisers, bass and vocals and Eleanor Myler on vocals and drums.

== Discography ==
=== Albums ===
- Twelve (2008)
- Vaults (2010)
- Cover & Flood (2012)
- Salt (2016)
- Salt Interventions (2018)
- Charles / VVII (2020)
- Hour of the Ox (2022)

=== Singles ===
- "Radio" (2008)
- "Heavy Lighting" (2012)
- "The Feast" (2013)
- "Foreign Fleas" (2015)
- Ghosts (2016)
- Mona (2022)
- Eraser (2022)

=== Film scores ===
- The Seashell and the Clergyman (La coquille et le clergyman) (2011)

=== Appears on ===
- The Nightsaver – David Kitt (2009)
- It Goes, It Goes (Forever & Ever) – Halves (2010)
- An Appointment with Mr Yeats – The Waterboys (2011)
- Songs to Save a Life – Various artists (2012)
- Final Witness (Episode 6: "A Mother's Revenge"/ Episode 7 – "What the Boy Saw")
- Beekeeper – Steve Wickham (2017)
- Wild Wild country - The award winning netflix series in 2018 featured the song 'Day is coming' in the first episode of season 1
- CYRM – The 2023 debut album from the irish folk group ØXN (Katie Kim, Eleanor Myler, Radie Peat and John “Spud” Murphy).
