= Susan O'Neill =

Susan O'Neill may refer to:

- Susie O'Neill (born 1973), Australian swimmer
- Susan O'Neill (academic), professor of education
- Susan O'Neill (singer), (fl. 2006 - ) Irish singer-songwriter
