= Cosmosphere (album) =

Studio album by Jape
- Released: 2003
- Genre: Electronica, hip hop, pop
- Length: 33:00
- Label: Volta Sounds

Jape chronology
| Cosmosphere (2003) | The Monkeys in the Zoo Have More Fun Than Me (2004) |

Professional ratings
Review scores
| Source | Rating |
|---|---|
| RTÉ | 2/5 stars |

Cosmosphere is the debut studio album of Jape released on the Volta Sounds label in 2003. The album received airplay on national radio on shows such as Donal Dineen's Here Comes the Night on Today FM. Like its successor, The Monkeys in the Zoo Have More Fun Than Me, which was released the following year, it contains eight tracks. The album is thirty-three minutes in length. Jape frontman Richie Egan was inspired to write the album in 2003 after he had developed Jape following a week's stay at the family home of Niall Byrne in Avoca, County Wicklow. Byrne is a member of the band The Redneck Manifesto, a band which Egan was and remains part of.

== Track listing ==
The track listing of Cosmosphere contains eight tracks and is thirty-three minutes in length.

| No. | Title | Length |
|---|---|---|
| 1. | "Cosmosphere" |
| 2. | "Into Lines" |
| 3. | "Wishful Thinking" |
| 4. | "Haunt Me" |
| 5. | "Nilsson" |
| 6. | "I Don't Know" |
| 7. | "All Your Friends" |
| 8. | "When You've Lost All Your Looks" |
| Total length: | | 33:00 |
