= Jape (band) =

Irish electronic–rock band

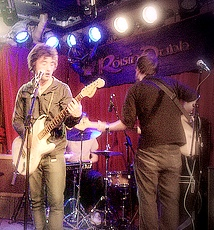
- Jape performing at Róisín Dubh, Galway in 2008

Background information
- Origin: Dublin, Ireland
- Genres: Electronic rock, electronica, folktronica, hip hop, pop
- Years active: 2003–present
- Labels: Faction Records LTD., Volta Sounds, Trust Me I'm A Thief, V2, co-op
- Members: Richie Egan; Glenn Keating; Matthew Bolger; Neil O'Connor
- Past members: Ronan Jackson

Jape are an Irish electronic–rock band from Dublin. Formed as a side project by Richie Egan whilst part of The Redneck Manifesto, they have released eight albums to date; Cosmosphere (2003), The Monkeys in the Zoo Have More Fun Than Me (2004), Ritual (2008), Ocean of Frequency (2011), This Chemical Sea (2015), Sentinel (2019), 9K HI Vol. 1 (2022), and Endless Thread (2023). Jape's wider discography includes the EP, Jape is Grape (2007), as well as a number of singles, including "Floating" and "Phil Lynott". The band have performed at festivals and events such as Glastonbury, Electric Picnic, Lovebox and Hard Working Class Heroes and provided support for The Flaming Lips at Belsonic in Belfast in August 2008.

The first and second albums received airplay on alternative national radio in Ireland. The Monkeys in the Zoo Have More Fun Than Me's opening track, "Floating", became a popular single on late night alternative music radio shows and attracted the attention of Brendan Benson during a visit to Dublin. Benson now covers the track whilst performing live with his band The Raconteurs, as do the Belgian bastard pop duo Soulwax during their DJ sets.

Jape's third album, Ritual, was released in June 2008, later winning the Choice Music Prize for Irish Album of the Year 2008. The album features the singles "I Was a Man", "Strike Me Down" and "Phil Lynott", the latter of which was subject to an unsuccessful petition by fans to have it named Ireland's Christmas number one single in December 2008.

The album Ocean of Frequency was released in 2011 and won Jape their second Choice Music Prize in March 2012.

== Background ==
Richie Egan is the principal songwriter but refers to the overall band as Jape. This came about following his first few solo performances when he realised he did not wish people to consider him a singer-songwriter but as part of a band. Egan has been part of many bands from a young age, and spent his youth experimenting with four-track tape recorders and sounds. He was previously a member of the bands Black Belt Jones and Sir Killalot. After leaving Black Belt Jones he went on to become the bassist in the instrumental rock band The Redneck Manifesto of which he is still a member. He has occasionally toured as part of David Kitt’s live band, as well as in Conor J. O'Brien's band Villagers as a bass player and with his bandmates in The Redneck Manifesto. By 2003 Egan had developed Jape after spending a week at the family home of fellow Redneck, Niall Byrne, in Avoca, County Wicklow.

== Style ==
Egan has said that he started listening to music during puberty. He was initially influenced by 1960s melodic pop such as Simon & Garfunkel, later listened to American hardcore punk such as the Dead Kennedys, Minor Threat, Black Flag but listens to many styles of music overall. The single "Strike Me Down" has been compared to MSTRKRFT and the French synthpop quartet Phoenix. Memories of a childhood show by heavy metal band Mastodon led him to write the song "Phil Lynott". He also enjoys newer Irish acts such as Villagers.

== Career ==
Jape's debut album, Cosmosphere, was released on the Volta Sounds label in 2003. National broadcaster RTÉ suggested in its review that Jape was not a "convincing electronic producer" and that Egan did not have the voice of a singer-songwriter, indicating its desire to see him remain with The Redneck Manifesto and refrain from any further activities under the pseudonym Jape. However, the album received airplay on national radio on shows such as Donal Dineen's Here Comes the Night on Today FM.

Jape's second album, The Monkeys in the Zoo Have More Fun Than Me was released by Trust Me I'm A Thief Records in 2004. It enjoyed much more success than its predecessor and contains the well-known single "Floating" which was given much airplay on late night alternative radio shows. The lead single "Floating" was famously overheard being played in Whelan's in Dublin by the musician Brendan Benson. Benson immediately requested a copy of the album and then praised Jape in The Guardian – however, the newspaper spelt it "Jabe". He also rang Egan personally to inform him he would be covering "Floating" with his band The Raconteurs. However, Egan has stated that he did not give Benson personal permission to cover the song. He did witness the cover live at the Olympia Theatre and was later to describe it as "a great moment". The single is also covered by Soulwax during their DJ sets. Jape participated in two nationwide tours with both David Kitt and The Redneck Manifesto to promote the album's release. Kitt was co-producer of "Floating". The band went on to perform at prominent Irish festivals such as Electric Picnic and Hard Working Class Heroes.

A collection of remixes of the "Floating" single were released in June 2007. A performance at the Lovebox festival in Dublin followed on 21 July that year. Jape recorded the EP Jape is Grape, due for release by V2 Records on 19 November 2007. Despite V2 folding in October 2007, the EP release went ahead and a nationwide tour of Ireland followed to promote what was the band's major label debut. The band re-signed to The Co-Op.

Ritual, Jape's first album in four years, was released under the Co-op label on 4 June 2008. It entered the Irish album charts at number fifteen, while the Irish Independent's John Meagher named it his twentieth best Irish album of the 2000s. Ritual featured ten tracks, including "Streetwise", "Graveyard" and "Strike Me Down", all of which had previously been performed live. The album was preceded by the single "I Was a Man", whilst a video for the song "Graveyard", which was filmed in an actual graveyard in Dublin, was also released. There was a host of Irish and European dates and festival appearances to promote the album in June 2008, including performances at the Róisín Dubh in Galway and Vicar Street and the Road Records music store in Dublin. Appearances alongside CSS, Battles and MGMT on the Park Stage and Dance Stage at Glastonbury in England on 28–29 June and an appearance at the Ola Festival in Spain followed. Jape then opened for The Flaming Lips at Belsonic in Belfast on 11 August 2008 and performed a free show as part of Heineken Green Spheres in Cork alongside Donal Dineen on 19 November 2008. Supporting Friendly Fires led to the English band remixing Jape's "Strike Me Down" single. There was also an appearance at Electric Picnic 2008 to follow the appearance Electric Picnic 2006. Tony Clayton-Lea, writing in The Irish Times beforehand, said: "Suffice to say that if this whippet-thin geezer isn't one of the highlights of this year's Picnic then that's it—we give up". In December 2008, Jape fans were behind an unsuccessful petition to have the single "Phil Lynott" become the Christmas number one single in Ireland.

As of March 2009, Jape had six songs written for a fourth album. An appearance at Electric Picnic 2009 occurred, however, a performance at Pohoda in Slovakia did not occur, with Jape narrowly escaping a stage collapse which killed one person and injured more than 90 others. On 19 March 2010 Jape were announced as one of the first acts expected to perform at that year's Indie-pendence.

Jape released the album Ocean of Frequency in 2011. Jape performed at the Eurosonic Festival in 2012 when Ireland was the "Spotlight Country". Richie Egan has since left Ireland and moved to Sweden.

In January 2015 Jape returned with their fifth studio album This Chemical Sea. The record was preceded by the single 'The Heart's Desire' and reached number 8 in Irish album charts. Following the album's release Jape toured Europe, playing live shows across the continent.

== Discography ==
=== Studio albums ===
Year	Album details	Peak chart positions
Year	Album details	IRL
2003	Cosmosphere: Released: 2003; Label: Volta Sounds; Formats: CD, download	—
2004	The Monkeys in the Zoo Have More Fun Than Me: Released: 7 September 2004; Label: Trust Me I'm a Thief; Formats: CD, download	—
2008	Ritual: Released: 4 June 2008; Label: Co-op Records; Formats: CD, download	16
2011	Ocean of Frequency: Released: 30 September 2011; Label: music/is/for/losers; Formats: CD, download	29
2015	This Chemical Sea: Released: 26 January 2015; Label: Faction Records; Formats: CD, download, vinyl lp	8
"—" denotes a title that did not chart.

=== Extended plays ===
Year	Album details	Peak chart positions
Year	Album details	IRL
2007	Jape Is Grape: Released: 2007; Label: Self Released; Formats: CD	—
"—" denotes a title that did not chart.

== Awards ==
=== Choice Music Prize ===
The nomination of Jape's third album, Ritual, for Ireland's Choice Music Prize was announced on 14 January 2009.

Ritual's victory was announced at a live ceremony held at Vicar Street, Dublin on 4 March 2009. The prize included a cheque for €10,000, jointly provided by the Irish Music Rights Organisation (IMRO) and the Irish Recorded Music Association (IRMA), and a specially commissioned award. Frontman Richie Egan joked about a rival nominee by saying: "They all deserve the award – sure my mother even told me that Mick Flannery (nominated for his album White Lies) was going to win, she said you're good, Richie, but he's gorgeous". The award was decided by a secret ballot after the twelve judges, who included Today FM presenter Ian Dempsey, decided that the decision was proving difficult due to a closeness in voting. Jape was amongst six of the nominees who performed at the event, with a three-song set featuring earlier in proceedings.

When Lisa Hannigan was nominated for the Mercury Prize, Ed Power, writing in the Irish Independent, wondered how close Jape had come to receiving a Mercury nomination—"Or, for that matter, how many of the judges had even heard of him".

Ocean of Frequency was nominated for the Choice Music Prize in January 2012 and was announced as winner on 8 March 2012, making Jape the first act to have won the award more than once.

Year	Nominee / work	Award	Result
2009	Ritual	Irish Album of the Year 2008	Won
2012	Ocean of Frequency	Irish Album of the Year 2011	Won

=== Meteor Music Awards ===
Richie Egan received one nomination at the 2009 Meteor Awards for his band Jape. He lost to Mick Flannery in the Best Irish Male category at the awards ceremony held on 17 March 2009.

Year	Nominee / work	Award	Result
2009	Jape/Richie Egan	Best Irish Male	Nominated

=== UK Music Video Awards ===
"Floating" was nominated for Best Budget Video at the UK Music Video Awards in 2008. Autamata, another Irish band, were also nominated for their video "Need You Sunshine" as were Example’s video for "Me and Mandy", Lise Westzynthius's video for "Childlike Curves" and These New Puritans's video for "Elvis". The awards ceremony took place on 14 October 2008 in the Odeon West End in Leicester Square, London.

Year	Nominee / work	Award	Result
2008	"Floating"	Best Budget Video	Nominated
