= Ritual (Jape album) =

Studio album by Jape
- Released: 4 June 2008
- Genres: Experimental pop, experimental rock
- Length: 41:00
- Label: Co-op Records

Jape chronology
The Monkeys in the Zoo Have More Fun Than Me (2004)	Ritual (2008)

Professional ratings
Review scores
Source	Rating
Cluas	link
Drop-D	link
RTÉ	link

Ritual is the third studio album from electronic rock band Jape, released on Co-op Records in 2008. It won the Choice Music Prize for the 2008 Irish Album of the Year in March 2009.

A video for the song "Graveyard", which was filmed in an actual graveyard in Dublin, was released in May 2008 prior to the release of the album. The album features the singles "I Was a Man", "Strike Me Down" and "Phil Lynott", which was subject to an unsuccessful petition by fans to have it named the Christmas number one in Ireland in December 2008. When squinted at, the cover album art reveals a skull.

The Irish Independent's John Meagher named Ritual his twentieth best Irish album of the 2000s.

== Track listing ==
Ritual featured ten tracks, including "Streetwise", "Graveyard" and "Strike Me Down", all of which had previously been performed live. The album was preceded by the single "I Was a Man". "Strike Me Down" was later released as a single.

No.	Title	Length
1.	"Christopher and Anthony"
2.	"I Was a Man"
3.	"Replays"
4.	"Graveyard"
5.	"Phil Lynott"
6.	"Streetwise"
7.	"At the Heart of All This Strangeness"
8.	"Apple in an Orchard"
9.	"Strike Me Down"
10.	"Nothing Lasts Forever"
Total length:		41:00

== Awards ==
The nomination of Ritual for the Choice Music Prize was announced on 14 January 2009. Ritual's victory was announced at a live ceremony held at Vicar Street, Dublin on 4 March 2009. The prize included a cheque for €10,000, jointly provided by the Irish Music Rights Organisation (IMRO) and the Irish Recorded Music Association (IRMA), and a specially commissioned award. Frontman Richie Egan joked about a rival nominee by saying: "They all deserve the award -- sure my mother even told me that Mick Flannery (nominated for his album White Lies) was going to win, she said you're good, Richie, but he's gorgeous". The award was decided by a secret ballot after the twelve judges, who included Today FM presenter Ian Dempsey, decided that the decision was proving difficult due to a closeness in voting. Jape was amongst six of the nominees who performed at the event, with a three-song set featuring earlier in proceedings. Upon the victory, Egan posted a message of thanks via Twitter: "Hah I won. Ten g's in the bank.. Big love and thanks for all good will x".

Year	Nominee / work	Award	Result
2009	Ritual	Irish Album of the Year 2008	Won
