= It Goes, It Goes (Forever & Ever) =

Studio album by Halves
- Released: 30 October 2010
- Recorded: August 2009
- Genre: Post-rock, ambient, dream pop, experimental rock
- Length: 55:40
- Label: HATEISTHEENEMY {Self-released}
- Producer: Brian Cash, Elis Czerniak & Tim Czerniak

Halves chronology
It Goes, It Goes (Forever & Ever) (2010)	Boa Howl (2013)

It Goes, It Goes (Forever & Ever) is the debut album by Dublin band Halves. It was released late 2010 in Ireland (and June 2011 in UK/Europe) through the band's own record label Hateistheenemy.

== Recording ==
Recorded in the Hotel2Tango studios in Montreal (housed in a former alarm factory beside a freight railroad) and tracked over two weeks in August 2009, It Goes, It Goes (Forever & Ever) was created with the use of the studio's vast collection of instruments, amps, organs, and effects (most of which dated from the 1930s to the 1980s). Eleven songs were recorded live, in one large room on 2″ reel-to-reel tape by Efrim Menuck (Godspeed You! Black Emperor), Howard Bilerman and Radwan Moumneh.

On returning to Ireland additional recording resumed with Richard McCullough in the band's own studio 'The Windfarm' and in various locations nationwide. Guest performers on the record include Amy Millan (Stars/Broken Social Scene), Katie Kim, Phil Boughton (Subplots), Canadian harpist Elaine Kelly-Canning, Irish Chamber brass and string players and twenty-seven members of the Kilkenny choir.

The album's title It Goes, It Goes refers to a signal the band were given by their engineer one day that the tape machine was rolling, making them laugh and ruin the take.

== Release ==
The album was released on CD, mp3 and deluxe vinyl on 30 October 2010 on their own Hateisthenemy label. The vinyl edition is gatefold 180-gram vinyl with the album's lyrics etched on the D side. Reviews from Ireland and the UK were unanimously positive and praised it for its bold ambition: "a debut that works from its first moment to its last...music that belongs to the witching hour" (The Irish Times Album of the Week). In January 2011 it was announced that the album had been nominated for the 2010 Choice Music Prize. The band performed two tracks at the ceremony in March that year but the award went to Two Door Cinema Club. In April 2012 the band released Live at The Unitarian Church on vinyl for Record Store Day, which features updated versions of songs from It Goes, It Goes plus songs from their first EP releases.

At the beginning of 2011, brothers Donal and Colum Mangan produced a music video for the song 'Darling, You'll Meet Your Maker' from the album. The video combines the fields of model making, stop-motion animation and computer animation. It depicts a small mouse's efforts to survive following the loss of his partner and his eventual survival and revenge against the perpetrator. The video can be seen at the following link:

Halves – Darling, You'll Meet Your Maker

== Track listing ==
All tracks written by Halves.

1. "Land/Sea/People" – 5:01
2. "Blood Branches" – 3:36
3. "Darling, You'll Meet Your Maker" – 5:19
4. "Growing & Glow" – 4:41
5. "The Little Octoberist – 5:53
6. "Haunt Me When I'm Drowsy – 4:53
7. "The Wellwisher" – 4:45
8. "I Raise Bears" – 5:52
9. "Don't Send Your Kids to the Lakes" – 2:47
10. "Mountain Bell" – 7:23
