= Lovebox =

Lovebox or Love Box may refer to:

- Lovebox Festival, an annual electronic music festival in London
- Lovebox Dublin, a Dublin music festival in 2007 and 2008
- Lovebox (Beni album), 2010
- Lovebox (Groove Armada album), 2002
- The Love Box (or (The) Lovebox), a 1972 British film

== See also ==
- "Love in a Box", a 1984 song by Sunnyboys
