= Uaneen Fitzsimons =

Irish music critic, television presenter and DJ

- Born: Uaneen Fitzsimons; 11 April 1971; Ardglass, County Down
- Died: 22 November 2000 (aged 29); Ballaghmore, County Laois
- Presenting career
- Show: No Disco
- Station: RTÉ2
- Style: Television presenter
- Country: Ireland
- Previous show: Jo Maxi

Uaneen Fitzsimons (11 April 1971 – 22 November 2000) was an Irish music critic, television presenter and DJ. She presented alternative music programmes on RTÉ television and radio during the 1990s and became an influential music critic and popular media personality in Ireland.

Fitzsimons was born in the village of Ardglass, County Down on 11 April 1971. She worked in the newsroom of BBC Northern Ireland before moving to Dublin to study. She received a bachelor’s degree in communications from the Dublin City University in 1994. While living in Dublin she reviewed bands for the teen television programme Jo Maxi and worked at the Ormond Multi-Media Centre. In 1997, she began working for RTÉ Cork as the presenter and researcher for No Disco, an alternative music television programme created by Donal Dineen. In 1999 she also started hosting a late-night radio show on RTÉ 2fm. Presenting on both television and radio for national broadcaster gave her a large influence on the Irish music scene. In her obituary in Hot Press, the news magazine described her as "a remarkable young woman whose passion for music made her one of the most widely respected and genuinely loved people in the history of Irish music".

Fitzsimons died on 22 November 2000 in Ballaghmore, near Borris-in-Ossory, County Laois when the car she was travelling in collided with a lorry which was travelling on the wrong side of the road. Dublin City University created the Uaneen Fitzsimons Award, given to students who have contributed significantly to the social and academic life of the university through extra curricular activity.
