= Floating (Jape song) =

Single by Jape

from the album The Monkeys in the Zoo Have More Fun Than Me
- Released: 2004
- Length: 3:14
- Label: Trust Me I'm a Thief/V2
- Songwriter(s): Richie Egan
- Producer(s): David Kitt/Richie Egan

Cover of the 2007 remixes of "Floating".

The award-nominated video for "Floating" sees Richie Egan attacked by fruit and vegetables as he attempts to paint a garden fence.

"Floating" is a 2004 single by the Irish band Jape, taken from the second studio album, The Monkeys in the Zoo Have More Fun Than Me and described as "Jape's trademark song". Co-produced by David Kitt, the single was the first release from the album and was generally viewed by critics as the standout track on the album. In 2007, it featured on the EP, Jape is Grape, for which a video was made. Brendan Benson of The Raconteurs is a known admirer of the song and has performed a cover version during live shows.

== Reception ==
"Floating" was a popular single on late night alternative music radio shows in Ireland. The national broadcaster RTÉ described the song as "part drugs story and part love song" and noted its "quirky instrumentation and Gregorian chanting". It described the lyrics as having "a definite feel of amateur philosophy at 5am" but it said that that was "not necessarily a bad thing".

== Cover versions ==
The song was famously overheard being played in Whelan's in Dublin by the musician Brendan Benson who immediately requested a copy of the album. A friend at the venue informed the band of this development following a show at The Bloom Festival during The Rose of Tralee festival in County Kerry. Benson then praised Jape in The Guardian (however, the newspaper spelt it "Jabe") and rang the song's writer to inform him he would be covering "Floating" with his band The Raconteurs. Benson did not actually receive permission to cover the track although it has been said that he would have been allowed to had he asked. Jape witnessed the cover live at the Olympia Theatre and was later to describe it as "a great moment". "Floating" is also covered by the Belgian bastard pop duo Soulwax during their DJ sets.

== 2007 remixes ==
A remix collection of "Floating" was released as a single on 4 June 2007 through the Marine Parade label of Adam Freeland. There were contributions from Prins Thomas, Alex Metric and Son Green over three formats. The 12" featured an eleven-minute "Prins Thomas Diskomiks" and an "Alex Metric Mix". The original version of "Floating" and a "Son Green Mix" featured on the 7", whilst the download version featured bonus tracks of "Prins Thomas Dub" and "Prins Thomas 0.75 Miks".

== Video ==
"Floating" went on to feature on the EP, Jape is Grape, released on 19 November 2007 on V2 Records. The video was recorded on 2 October 2007 and was directed by M&E and D.A.D.D.Y. The video's storyline involves Richie Egan walking onscreen to finish painting a garden fence. As he completes this task he is hit with a piece of fruit by an unknown assailant. He is then hit with more fruit before gently lifting off the ground as a water melon is hurled in his direction. Despite this an apple hits him in the face and this is followed by a stream of fruit and vegetables including broccoli, pears, a tomato which splashes across his forehead and a shower of grapes which cascade onto him from above as he attempts to defend himself. A coconut hits a bottle and glass of milk which are positioned on a stepladder, sending the contents flying through the air. As the fruit piles up Egan slips and falls exhaustedly onto the ground, with more food landing on top of him and apparently burying him. The fruit and vegetables then rise up to form an anthropomorphistic figure, with Egan's facial features visible beneath. An apple is then hurled at Egan beneath the fruit but it freezes mid-air and Egan rises above it out of the picture as the apple falls to the ground. The video ends with a fruitless Egan walking into shot clutching his paintbrush; he then picks up the fallen apple and takes a bite before returning to complete his painting of the garden fence.

== Awards ==
=== UK Music Video Awards ===
"Floating" was nominated for Best Budget Video at the UK Music Video Awards in 2008. Autamata, another Irish band, were also nominated for their video "Need You Sunshine" as were Example’s video for "Me and Mandy", Lise Westzynthius's video for "Childlike Curves" and These New Puritans's video for "Elvis". The awards ceremony took place on 14 October 2008 in the Odeon West End in Leicester Square, London.

Year	Nominee / work	Award	Result
2008	"Floating"	Best Budget Video	Nominated
