= Road Records =

Road Records was an independent record store in Dublin, Ireland. Extensive media coverage followed its closure in January 2009 but it had relaunched by April with the support of the Irish music community. It was often used by people outside Ireland to purchase Irish music, such as The Cake Sale's charity album for Oxfam.

On 16 July 2010, it was announced that Road Records would close for a second time, because of unsuccessful sales. Business stopped on 24 July.

== Closure ==
Hailed as part of the cultural identity of the city and lauded as being one of the city's best known independent music stores, its closure after eleven years of existence due to the 2008 financial crisis and Great Recession came to the attention of the national media when its owner, Dave Kennedy, highlighted the difficulties facing his store and the music industry in general on the store's website, difficulties which included being priced out of the market, the rise of illegal file sharing on the internet, the changing leisure pursuits of modern teenagers, the spiralling costs of running a business in Ireland and the rapid decrease in the number of people visiting Dublin. Kennedy stated:

We don't see any young people in the shop any more; so as we lose older customers, we don't gain any new ones.

The store was a popular topic amongst the Irish blogging community and its closure was greeted with posts expressing much disappointment. ThrillPier's blog had the post: "Road was the place to go for decent indie stuff. I especially loved the photos from local gigs that were up on the walls. Everyone from the White Horse generation of punk/indie fans will lament the passing of this great shop. Where will I get my Burning Love Jumpsuit CDs now?".

Hot Press praised Road's willingness to sell the sort of music "not readily available" in other stores, describing it as "a much-loved fixture" in the Dublin music scene. The Irish Times described Road Records as "to Irish independent music what Richard and Judy are to new authors", referencing the British television presenters' renowned bookclub and pointing out that, even after having won an Academy Award, Glen Hansard regularly visited the store when he was at home in Dublin.

== Relaunch ==
Road Records relaunched on 18 April 2009 following assistance from the Irish music community. Irish musicians, Paul Noonan, Lisa Hannigan, Conor O'Brien of Villagers, Neil Hannon and Jape, played acoustic sets at the reopening of the store.

== Second Closure ==
On 16 July 2010, it was announced that Road Records would close again, this time for good. Despite the support received, business was still failing. All records were sold at 25% off and other store items such as cash registers and turntables were put up for sale. The shop closed its doors on 24 July 2010.
