= This Chemical Sea =

Studio album by Jape
- Released: January 23, 2015
- Genres: Electronic, electropop, indie
- Length: 44:36
- Label: Faction Records
- Producers: Richie Egan & Glenn Keating

Jape chronology
Ocean of Frequency (2011)	This Chemical Sea (2015)

Professional ratings
Review scores
Source	Rating
Hot Press	4/5 stars
The Irish Times	4/5 stars
Drowned In Sound	8/10 stars
The Last Mixed Tape	9/10 stars
State	3/5 stars
Nialler9	4/5 stars

This Chemical Sea is the fifth studio album from Irish recording artist Jape. The album was released on January 23, 2015 via Faction Records and reached number 8 in the Irish charts.

== Recording and Release ==
The album was written and recorded primarily at Richie Egan's studio in Malmo in Sweden, with fellow Jape member Glenn Keating also working on the album. Villagers front-man Conor O'Brein also features on the record, lending his vocals to the track 'Ribbon Ribbon Ribbon.

'The Heart's Desire' was the first single to be taken from This Chemical Sea and was streamed in October 2014. The album itself was released in January 2015 through Faction Records, reaching the number 8 spot in the Irish album charts.

== Track listing ==
No.	Title	Length
1.	"Seance of Light"	3:56
2.	"The Heart's Desire"	4:06
3.	"Absolutely Animals"	3:32
4.	"Without Life in a Way"	4:07
5.	"Metamorphosis"	5:36
6.	"Breathe of Life"	5:21
7.	"I Go"	4:14
8.	"Love on the Crest of a Wave"	3:50
9.	"Ribbon Ribbon Ribbon"	6:09
10.	"This Chemical Sea"	3:45

== Critical reception ==
This Chemical Sea was received well by critics upon its release, garnering generally positive reviews. Irish Times music critic Tony Clayton-Lea wrote that the album was "As vivid and vital an electro-pop record as you’ll surely hear this year.". While The Last Mixed Tape said "Jape’s latest album feels like a mantra built on hypnotic rhythm, in the moment lyricism and atmospheric openness" Drowned In Sound were also positive about the album and referred to it as "smart electro-pop expertly realised". The record also featured as Nialler9's 'Album of the Week'.

Not all reviews were completely positive, with State.ie commenting "Vocals are buried under the instruments and reverb, making you wish for the heart achingly humble ‘Phil Lynott’."

== Personnel ==
=== Performers ===
- Richie Egan – Composer and primary musician
- Conor O'Brien - Vocals on 'Ribbon Ribbon Ribbon'

=== Technical Personnel ===
- Recorded by Richie Egan & Glenn Keating
- Mixed by David Wrench
- Mastered by Matt Colton
