= Jay Ahern =

Irish radio presenter

- Occupation: Radio presenter

Jay Ahern was an Irish radio presenter with RTÉ 2fm. He left the station in 2003 and was replaced by Dan Hegarty. He was amongst the industry professionals who were outspoken about the loss of the music television programme, No Disco, just before his own departure from the radio in 2003.
