= The Monkeys in the Zoo Have More Fun Than Me =

Studio album by Jape
- Released: 7 September 2004
- Length: 37:00
- Label: Trust Me I'm a Thief Records

Jape chronology
Cosmosphere (2003)	The Monkeys in the Zoo Have More Fun Than Me (2004)	Ritual (2008)

Professional ratings
Review scores
Source	Rating
RTÉ	3/5 stars

The Monkeys in the Zoo Have More Fun Than Me is the second studio album of Jape released by Trust Me I'm a Thief Records in 2004. The album was launched in Dublin's Crawdaddy venue. Like its predecessor, Cosmosphere, which was released the previous year, it contains eight tracks. The album included the single "Floating", a song later covered by Brendan Benson of The Raconteurs and the Belgian bastard pop duo Soulwax during their DJ sets. The Monkeys in the Zoo Have More Fun Than Me was followed by the ten-track Choice Music Prize-winning album Ritual which was released in 2008.

== Success of "Floating" ==
The album was preceded by the well-known single "Floating", which was produced by David Kitt. The song was given much airplay on late night alternative radio shows. "Floating" was famously overheard being played in Whelan's in Dublin by the musician Brendan Benson who immediately requested a copy of the album. Benson then praised Jape in The Guardian (however, the newspaper spelt it "Jabe") and rang the song's writer to inform him he would be covering "Floating" with his band The Raconteurs. Benson did not actually receive permission to cover the track although it has been said that he would have been allowed to had he asked. Jape witnessed the cover live at the Olympia Theatre and was later to describe it as "a great moment". Soulwax have also covered "Floating" during their DJ sets.

A remix collection of "Floating" was released as a single on 4 June 2007 through the Marine Parade label of Adam Freeland. It later went on to feature on the EP, Jape is Grape, released on 19 November 2007 on V2 Records. A video for the song was recorded on 2 October 2007 and was directed by M&E and D.A.D.D.Y. The "Floating" video was later nominated for Best Budget Video at the UK Music Video Awards in 2008.

== Track listing ==
The Monkeys in the Zoo Have More Fun Than Me features eight tracks and is thirty-seven minutes in length.

No.	Title	Length
1.	"Floating"
2.	"Reminding Me"
3.	"How Much Light"
4.	"The Hardest Thing To Do"
5.	"To the Sea"
6.	"A Journey is Just a Memory"
7.	"Autumn Summer"
8.	"Always Knew"
Total length:		37:00
