= Dan Hegarty =

Irish broadcaster

- Born: Daniel Hegarty
- Presenting career
- Show: The Alternative
- Station: RTÉ 2fm
- Time slot: Monday - Thursday, 23:00 – 00:00
- Style: Disc jockey
- Country: Ireland
- Website: www.rte.ie/radio/2fm/dan-hegarty-the-alternative/

Dan Hegarty is an Irish radio presenter employed by RTÉ. He presents his show The Alternative on RTÉ 2fm Monday to Thursday from 11pm–12am (the show is broadcast live each morning on RTÉ 2XM from 11am to 12pm). He is regularly dispatched to important musical events such as the Eurosonic Festival in The Netherlands, Electric Picnic and Oxegen for live broadcasting purposes, as well as being sent around the country to present the 2fm 2moro 2our. In 2008 Hegarty featured on the panel of judges for the Choice Music Prize and was sent to The Music Show to distribute advice.

== Early life ==
Hegarty is originally from Sandymount, Dublin. He graduated from the radio broadcasting course at Dún Laoghaire College of Art and Design.

== Career ==
Hegarty was one of a number of RTÉ 2fm's newer recruits who were seized from Phantom FM in 2003 - also snatched were Cormac Battle and Jenny Huston. Programme producer John McMahon revealed he had been aware of the presenter for some time before signing him. Hegarty was drafted in to replace Jay Ahern, on the Sunday night/Monday morning album show, airing from 12 midnight to 02:00. He was later given the same time slot from Tuesday - Thursday before progressing to his current four nights per week show.

In August 2010 Dan returned to presenting "The Alternative To Sleep" Mondays to Thursdays (11pm to 1am), after briefly presenting "There Is No Alternative" since January.

Over the years, Dan championed acts such as Buck 65, Super Delta Three a.k.a. Ziggi Baker, God Is An Astronaut, And So I Watch You From Afar, and countless others. In addition to this the show broadcasts weekly live music from acts like The Prodigy, Gogol Bordello, Muse, and Santigold.

Another aspect of the show is the 2FM Sessions, which have since their inception featured everyone from U2 to Scary Eire, and Power of Dreams - it gave The Thrills their first radio coverage.

As well as being a deejay, Dan has also released two books in his career. Buried Treasure, Overlooked Forgotten and Uncrowned Albums, features albums from all decades and genres that did not receive the full credit they deserve. The books features ebullient descriptions of albums alongside images of album artwork, with comments from the band on the process of creating the album.

== Personal life ==
Hegarty lives in Dublin.

== Awards ==
Hegarty was nominated in the category of Best National Radio DJ - National at the 2009 and 2010 Meteor Awards.

With the exception of people like Dan Hegarty, it is next to impossible to get your music played on 2fm. — Choice Music Prize nominee.

Year	Nominee / work	Award	Result
2009	Dan Hegarty	Best Radio DJ - National at the Meteor Awards	Nominated
2010	Dan Hegarty	Best Radio DJ - National at the Meteor Awards	Nominated
