= Phil Lynott (song) =

Single by Jape

from the album Ritual
- Released: 19 December 2008
- Songwriter: Richie Egan

"Phil Lynott" is a 2008 single by the Irish band Jape, taken from their third studio album, Ritual. Released on 19 December 2008, Jape fans were behind an unsuccessful online petition to establish the song as the Christmas number one in the Irish Singles Chart. "Phil Lynott" was well-received, with critics generally regarding it as one of the finer songs on the Ritual album and the Irish Independent naming it the best Irish song of the year.

== Song information ==
"Phil Lynott" has been described as "a children’s fairy tale type of song". It is a simple song with three chords which describes the events of one night when the writer attended a live performance by the heavy metal band Mastodon in Dublin. Mastodon performed a cover of a Thin Lizzy song – the band fronted by the musician of the title. Following the show's completion, the writer and his friends witnessed a lunar eclipse. The lyrics "One day I will be a dead man who plays the bass from Crumlin/Like Phil Lynott" were praised in a review by the national broadcaster RTÉ for their mixture of "humour and seriousness through raw, emotional thoughts". Jape's founder Richie Egan, like Lynott, has connections to the Dublin suburb of Crumlin.

== Criticism ==
Egan was reported as being "a bit annoyed at the “internet trolls”" who gave him much criticism over the song. He was criticised in some quarters by people who claimed the song's lyrics were childish and who pointed out that it was a simple song with three chords. Egan describes "Phil Lynott" as "a totally honest song about the things that happened... ...one night. It’s just written the way it happened on the night, and I don’t see anything wrong with that".

== Reaction ==
The Irish Independent described the song as "a real aw-shucks moment for Irish pop" in 2008, with the same publication later calling it the best Irish song of that year. Jape fans launched an online petition to establish the song as the Christmas number one in the Irish Singles Chart. However, it lost out to a cover of the Leonard Cohen song "Hallelujah", performed by Alexandra Burke, that year's winner of British television talent show The X Factor. The song is often covered by Irish indie musician Rob Smith.
