= Hour of the Ox =

Studio album by Katie Kim
- Released: 9 September 2022
- Studios: Guerrilla Studios, Dublin; Field recordings from New York, NY and Faithlegg, County Waterford
- Genres: Indie folk, alternative rock, lo-fi, experimental
- Label: I Actually Like Music
- Producers: Katie Kim, John ‘Spud’ Murphy

Katie Kim chronology
Salt (2016)	Hour of the Ox (2022)

Professional ratings
Review scores
Source	Rating
Clunk	4/5 stars
Hot Press	9/10
The Irish Times	4/5 stars
New Noise Magazine	4/5 stars
No Transmission	4.5/5 stars

Hour of the Ox is the fourth studio album by Irish singer and musician Katie Kim. It was released on 9 September 2022 on her own label, I Actually Like Music. Hour of the Ox was partially recorded at the artist's home and in Guerrilla Studios, Dublin with John ‘Spud’ Murphy. Additional field recordings were made in New York and Faithlegg, County Waterford. Hour of the Ox was released self-released on vinyl and via digital download.

== Track listing ==
All songs written by Katie Kim. All songs were arranged by Katie Kim & John ‘Spud’ Murphy, except 'Into Which the Worm Falls' arranged by John 'Spud' Murphy.

Side one

1. "Mona" – 5.02
2. "Eraser" – 4.56
3. "Feeding on the Metals" – 4.25
4. "Helen (Carry the Load)" – 1.16

Side two

1. "Gentle Little Bird" – 7.00
2. "Into Which the Worm Falls" – 3.13
3. "Golden Circles" – 4.50
4. "I See Old Joy" – 2.02
5. "Really Far" – 4.16

== Personnel ==
- Katie Kim – vocals, guitar, piano, drums, bass
- John 'Spud' Murphy – vocals, synthesizers, bass, supersonics
- Kate Ellis – cello
- Shane O Brien – violin
- Sarah Grimes – drums
- Eleanor Myler – drums
- Radie Peat – vocals, bayan
- John 'Spud' Murphy and Katie Kim – mixing
- Harvey Birrell – mastering

== Reception ==
Hour of the Ox received a positive reception. Amanda Farrah of The Quietus wrote "Katie Kim’s Hour of the Ox is filled with wild vacillations in the densities of the songs, sometimes within the songs." Georgia Howlett of The Upcoming, who gave it four out of five stars and described it as "haunted yet decadent". Siobhán Kane of The Irish Times also gave it four out of five stars, describing it as "resonant, evocative, and atmospheric". Writing for Hot Press, Will Russell called the album "an exquisite album that demands exploration". Malvika Paddin of Earmilk called the album "a luscious collection of music built upon an expansive and orchestral bed of strings, synths and minimalistic drum beats." Stephen White of The Last Mixed Tape opined that "Much like Cage’s arctic sonic explorations, Kim’s journeys far from the crowd in Hour Of The Ox yields the same fascination, and are essential to the diverse tapestry of Irish music."
