= Cover & Flood =

Studio album by Katie Kim
- Released: 1 March 2012
- Recorded: 2010–2011
- Genres: Indie folk, alternative rock, lo-fi, experimental
- Label: Flaming June Records
- Producers: Katie Kim, John Haggis

Cover & Flood is the second album by Dublin singer and musician, Katie Kim. It was released on 1 March 2012 via Bandcamp, in April 2012 in Ireland, and in April 2013 in UK/Europe through Flaming June Records.

Cover & Flood was partially recorded at the artist's home and partially recorded in Granny Studios, a former residential home that Kim, John Haggis and other musicians based in Waterford helped to build and turn into a still-functioning recording studio in Waterford City, Ireland.

Cover & Flood was released on double vinyl, CD and via digital download.

== Track listing ==
All songs written by Katie Kim, except where noted.

Side A

1. "Birds Fly low" – 1.40
2. "Charlie" – 3.12
3. "The Feast" – 2.24
4. "Sugar" – 0.51 Katie Kim, Ray Kehoe
5. "Pause" – 3.55

Side B

1. "All Living Things" – 1.34
2. "Heavy Lighting" – 3.51
3. "Caught in a Sling" – 1.20
4. "Blood Bean" – 3.39
5. "Dimmer" – 3.09
6. "Fake Your Death" – 2.21

Side C

1. "Jennifer Mache" – 0.56
2. "Your Mountains" – 4.06
3. "Rabbit Paw" – 0.56 Katie Kim, Ray Kehoe
4. "Science of Sleep" – 1.35

Side D

1. "Last Waltz" – 1.34
2. "Little Dragon" – 3.10 Katie Kim, John Murphy
3. "Wires" – 1.18
4. "Red Flags" – 3.20
5. "Habits" – 3.06

== Personnel ==
- Katie Kim – vocals, guitar, piano, drums, bass
- Aisling Browne – voice
- Jess Maderson – cello
- John "Spud" Murphy – bass manipulation, chimes
- "Deaf" Joe Harney – clarinet voice
- Ray Kehoe – guitar, mellotron, bass
- John Haggis – drums, co-producer, recording
- Alex Lennon – mastering
