= No Disco =

Irish music television programme, 1993-2003

- Genre: Music
- Presented by: Donal Dineen; Uaneen Fitzsimons(1997 - 2000); Leagues O'Toole (2001–03)
- Country of origin: Ireland
- Original language: English

Original release
- Network: Network 2
- Release: 1993 – 2003

No Disco is RTÉ's former flagship music television programme, broadcast on Irish television channel, Network 2, from 1993 – 2003. It was presented by Donal Dineen, Uaneen Fitzsimons and, following the death of Fitzsimons, Lawrence "Leagues" O'Toole. When Fitzsimons died in a car crash in November 2000, there was a gap in programming for some months afterwards, until the series returned with O'Toole as presenter on 28 February 2001. Musicians and bands such as David Gray, The Frames, David Kitt and The Divine Comedy attribute a large portion of their success to exposure on No Disco, and these were among the thousands who lent their support to a campaign to have the show retained by RTÉ. However, the show was cancelled in 2003, in a move that caused much controversy among its viewers – at the time it was the only RTÉ show showcasing alternative music and there was no replacement show lined up to take its place. There was a repeat of this situation in December 2008 when TV 3 purchased Channel 6 and dropped Night Shift. In recent years The Last Broadcast, Other Voices, and (When) Under Ether have acted as some form of replacements for the gap that has emerged but none with the same success.

== Cancellation ==
No Disco was suddenly cancelled by Network 2 in 2003. Thousands of people signed an online petition demanding the show be reinstated - the petition had 2,000 signatures within a week and 4,000 signatures by April of that year. Many of the signatures of support were from industry professionals, radio stations, record companies, record shops and promotion companies. Music experts within the national media, such as Tom Dunne (of Today FM at the time), Dave Fanning (2FM), Tony Clayton-Lea (The Irish Times), Jay Ahern (2FM, Vital Distribution) and Kim Porcelli (Hot Press) spoke about the central role No Disco had in bringing about significant improvements to the Irish music industry.
