= White Lies (Mick Flannery album) =

Studio album by Mick Flannery
- Released: September 12, 2008
- Recorded: Ireland
- Genre: Rock, Folk
- Length: 39 minutes
- Label: EMI Ireland

Mick Flannery chronology
| Evening Train (2005) | White Lies (2008) | 'Red to Blue (2012) |

White Lies is the second studio album released by Irish singer-songwriter Mick Flannery. The album was released on September 12, 2008. It achieved a top ten position on the Irish Albums Chart and featured prominently on the country's national radio stations.

White Lies went platinum in Ireland. It also received a nomination for the Choice Music Prize. When The Irish Times placed Flannery at number forty-six in a list of "The 50 Best Irish Acts Right Now" it published in April 2009 it referenced the album White Lies in its comments.

== Promotion ==
Earlier in 2008, Flannery made an appearance on RTÉ Two's music television programme Other Voices. The reaction he received was positive, and Flannery was later described by one reviewer as the "where's he been hiding?" act of that series. There were calls for him to receive his own episode of the show.

On the day of the album's release Flannery performed the track "Tomorrow's Papers" on The Late Late Show.

He commenced a nationwide tour of Ireland after the release of White Lies.

== Reception ==
Professional ratings
Review scores
| Source | Rating |
|---|---|
| entertainment.ie | (3.5/5) |
| RTÉ Entertainment | (4/5) |

As with his previous album, Flannery's age was noted: he was twenty-four years old at the time White Lies was released. When he released his debut album, Evening Train, in 2005, his age of twenty-one years was also noted. At this stage two of his songs had already won an award each at the International Songwriting Competition, an achievement which has received much attention as he was the first Irish musician to win in this competition.

entertainment.ie reviewer Lauren Murphy said of the album: "White Lies may not be a perfect album, but it's certainly a promising step forward for a real talent". Public service broadcaster Raidió Teilifís Éireann's reviewer Harry Guerin commented on White Lies: "If you're adamant that Ireland may sink with another singer-songwriter on tour, then this is a record to seek out; you won't notice the time passing and the nation will remain afloat". There was praise for the faster songs such as "Tomorrow's Paper" and "What Do You See".

The Irish Times placed Flannery at number forty-six in a list of "The 50 Best Irish Acts Right Now" published in April 2009, commenting on the White Lies album as having "changed everything" and "With this stunning exhibition of the gravel-voiced musician’s abilities, Flannery turned his hand to mournful piano ballads and catchy guitar tunes with a flair that far surpasses his 25 years".

== Track listing ==
All tracks are written by Mick Flannery.

| No. | Title | Length |
|---|---|---|
| 1. | "Safety Rope" |
| 2. | "California" |
| 3. | "Tomorrow's Paper" |
| 4. | "Wish You Well" |
| 5. | "Goodbye" |
| 6. | "Near or Far" |
| 7. | "Wait Here" |
| 8. | "What Do You See" |
| 9. | "Smiling Girl" |
| 10. | "Arise Now" |
| 11. | "Do Me Right" |
| Total length: | | 39 minutes |

== Awards ==
In 2009, White Lies was nominated for the Choice Music Prize's Irish Album of the Year 2008. Flannery was one of seven of the ten nominated acts to perform at the award ceremony in Vicar Street on March 4.

White Lies lost to Ritual by Jape. However, Flannery was mentioned in the acceptance speech, as frontman Richie Egan mentioned what his mother had told him before the award: “They all deserve the award -- sure my mother even told me that Mick Flannery was going to win, she said you're good, Ritchie [sic], but he's gorgeous”.

| Year | Nominee / work | Award | Result |
|---|---|---|---|
| 2009 | White Lies | Irish Album of the Year 2008 | Nominated |
