= Here Comes the Night (radio show) =

Here Comes the Night was a late night radio show hosted by Donal Dineen on Today FM in Ireland. It commenced broadcasting on 17 March 1997, lasting for a seven-year period before being replaced by Dineen's show Small Hours. It was Dineen's first radio show on Today FM, airing from the station's opening day. Dineen is largely credited with breaking David Gray in Ireland during this show's tenure. Other artists whose music featured on this show included Jape, who went on to win the Choice Music Prize in 2009.

Preceded by incumbent	Donal Dineen on Today FM (1997 - present)	Succeeded by Small Hours
