= Small Hours =

Small Hours was the late night radio show hosted by Donal Dineen on Today FM. It commenced broadcasting in 2004, following the seven-year tenure of Here Comes the Night. It is Dineen's second radio show on Today FM, airing Monday – Thursday, 00:00 – 02:00.

On 30 December 2007, The Small Hours had a two-hour radio special broadcast from the living room of David Gray's London home, where Gray and Liam Ó Maonlaí traded songs and stories on the piano and acoustic guitar, "intermittently picking their Desert Island discs for Dineen to spin". Dineen is largely credited with breaking Gray in Ireland.

In recent years, the Small Hours has ended and been replaced by the Midnight Chill, an hour devoted to playing a mixture of chill-out songs that have been released in recent years.

Preceded by Here Comes the Night	Donal Dineen on Today FM (1997 – present)	Succeeded by The Midnight Chill
