= Halves (band) =

Irish ambient band based in Dublin

- Origin: Dublin, Ireland
- Genres: Ambient, electronic rock, alternative rock
- Years active: 2006–present
- Labels: Hate is the Enemy
- Members: Brian Cash; Tim Czerniak; Elis Czerniak
- Past members: David Scanlon
- Website: ahomeforhalves.com

Halves are an Irish ambient band based in Dublin. It is composed of Brian Cash and brothers Tim and Elis Czerniak, with additional live members.

== Formation ==
Halves was formed when Dave, Brian and Tim sat down together and listed bands and composers they admired. They decided on the band's image, including their website and artwork and the visuals of their live shows and had “a very clear manifesto about the kind of sound we wanted and the kind of thing we wanted to do, which not many bands in this country Ireland were doing”. Elis joined soon after and work began on their debut release.

== Recordings ==
The band has released two EPs: the self-titled Halves and 2008's seven-track Haunt Me When I'm Drowsy. These were followed by the single "Blood Branches" in March 2009 on a split 7-inch with fellow Dublin band Subplots.

In 2010, their debut album, It Goes, It Goes (Forever & Ever), was released to critical acclaim. The album was released in the UK and mainland Europe on 4 July 2011. Recorded in the Hotel2Tango studios in Montreal (housed in a former alarm factory beside a freight railroad) and tracked over two weeks in August 2009, the record was created with the use of the studio's vast collection of antique instruments, amps, organs, and effects (most of which date from the 1930s). Eleven songs were recorded live, in one large room on 2″ reel-to-reel tape by Efrim Menuck (Godspeed You! Black Emperor), Howard Bilerman, and Radwan Moumneh. Guest performers on the record include Amy Millan (Stars/Broken Social Scene), Katie Kim, Phil Boughton (Subplots), Canadian harpist Elaine Kelly-Canning (Carnival Moon), Irish Chamber brass and string players and twenty-seven members of the Kilkenny Ladies' choir. It Goes, It Goes (Forever & Ever) was shortlisted for the Choice Music Prize for Irish Album of the Year 2010.

The band released their second studio album, Boa Howl, in July 2013 to critical acclaim.

== Live ==
Halves has played Oxegen 2008 and Electric Picnic 2008 as well as Hard Working Class Heroes, IMRO Showcase Tour and the London Calling showcase in London, England. In 2009 Halves made their debut TV performance, topping the viewers choice poll on RTÉ's 'Other Voices' series. They have supported British Sea Power, 65daysofstatic, Low, Amiina, This Will Destroy You, The Middle East & Mercury Rev. Their 2008 appearance at Eurosonic Festival in Holland was their first outside Ireland and they have since travelled twice to Toronto to play at Canadian Music Week and Texas for SXSW. Other festival outings include Kilkenny Arts Festival Kilkenny in 2010 and The Great Escape Brighton, England in 2011

The band is known for switching between a wide range of instruments while performing – including electric guitars, dulcimer, drum kit, piano, vocoder, synth, laptop, accordion, clarinet, flugelhorn, trombone and various effects. Pre-programmed and live visuals at their live shows are performed by the group Slipdraft, whose members are Sam Boles, Daniel Staines and Cormac Murray. The band's live sound engineer is Ciaran Mangan, who also recorded their live album.

In April 2012, the band released a live album (Live at the Unitarian Church) to celebrate Record Store Day 2012.

== Discography ==
=== Studio albums ===
Year	Album details	Peak chart positions		Certifications
Year	Album details	IRL	UK	Certifications
2010	It Goes, It Goes (Forever & Ever): Released: 29 October 2010; Label: hateistheenemy; Formats: CD, digital download, vinyl	42	—	
2013	Boa Howl: Released: 5 July 2013; Label: hateistheenemy; Formats: CD, digital download, vinyl	79	—	
"—" denotes a title that did not chart.

=== Singles ===
Year	Single	Peak chart positions		Album
Year	Single	IRL	UK	Album
2009	"Blood Branches"	—	—	Blood Branches EP
2011	"I Raise Bears"	—	—	It Goes, It Goes (Forever & Ever)
2011	"Growing & Glow"	—	—	It Goes, It Goes (Forever & Ever)
2011	"Darling You'll Meet Your Maker"	—	—	It Goes, It Goes (Forever & Ever)
"—" denotes releases that did not chart

=== Extended plays ===
Year	Title
2007	Halves EP
2008	Haunt Me When I'm Drowsy EP
2009	Blood Branches Split 7-inch
2012	Live at the Unitarian Church live album – Clear 12-inch vinyl released to celebrate Record Store Day 2012: Formats: vinyl, digital download

== Awards ==
=== Choice Music Prize ===
It Goes, It Goes (Forever & Ever) was nominated for the Choice Music Prize in 2011 and the band performed two songs live at the awards in Dublin's Vicar Street.

Year	Nominee / work	Award	Result
2011	It Goes, It Goes (Forever & Ever)	Irish Album of the Year 2010	Nominated
