= Boa Howl =

Studio album by Halves
- Released: 5 July 2013
- Recorded: August 2012
- Genre: Post-rock, ambient, dream pop, experimental rock
- Length: 52:21
- Label: HATEISTHEENEMY
- Producer: Brian Cash, Elis Czerniak & Tim Czerniak

Halves chronology
Live at the Unitarian Church (2012)	Boa Howl (2013)

Boa Howl is the second studio album by Dublin band Halves. It was released July 2013 through the band's own record label Hateistheenemy.

== Recording ==
The album was recorded over two weeks at Svenska Grammofon Studion in Gothenburg. Guest vocals appear courtesy of Gemma Hayes, a fan of the band for some time. Canadian musician Elaine Kelly-Canning features on harp, and added string performances come courtesy of local Swedish players. 'Boa Howl' refers to a summit on a mountain in China dubbed 'White Boa Howl', which the band felt captured the surreal nature of the songs.

== Track listing ==
All tracks written by Halves.

1. "Drumhunter" – 4:29
2. "The Glass Wreckage" – 4:05
3. "Drip Pools" – 4:09
4. "Tanager Peak" – 4:24
5. "Best Summer" – 5:02
6. "White Boa Howl" – 3:43
7. "Bring Your Bad Luck" – 4:42
8. "Hug the Blood" – 5:48
9. "Slow Drawl Moon (For David)" – 4:03
10. "Polynia" – 5:53
11. "Let Them Come" – 6:05
