= Susan O'Neill (singer) =

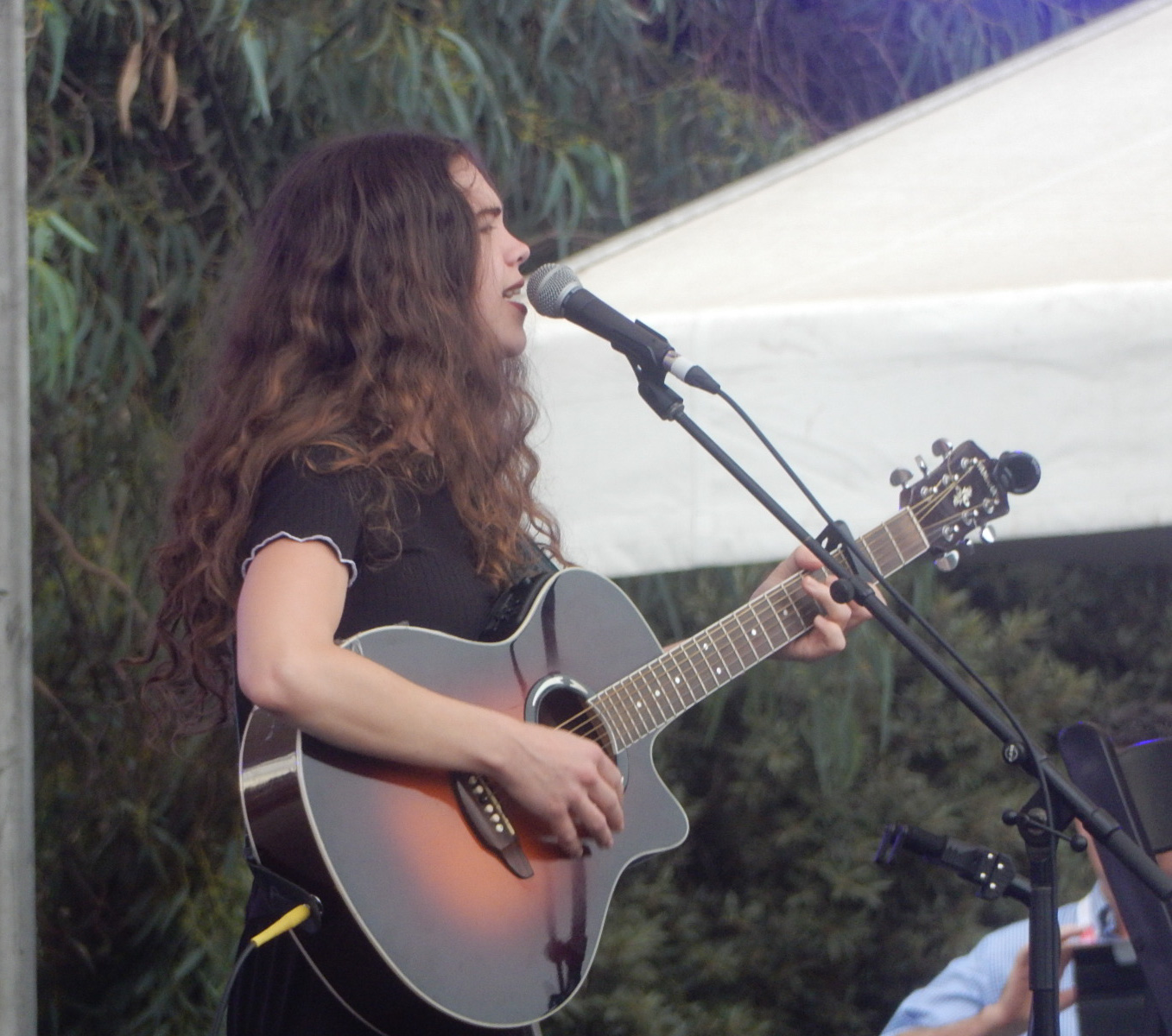
- O'Neill at the WOMADelaide (2019)

Background information
- Born: 21 April 1990 (age 36); Ennis, County Clare
- Instruments: singer guitar trumpet
- Website: SusanONeill.ie

Susan O'Neill, also known professionally as SON, is an Irish singer-songwriter and filmmaker, from Ennis, County Clare. She is known for In the Game, an album she made with Mick Flannery.

== Early years ==
Susan O’Neill is from County Clare, Ireland. She was the youngest member of the Ennis Brass Band and the Really Truly Joyful Gospel Choir. After leaving school, she went to Waterford to do a BA in Music at WIT and began performing with popular local acts King Kong Company and Propeller Palms.

== Career ==
=== Found Myself Lost ===
SON's 2018 debut album Found Myself Lost saw her being favourably compared with the likes of Janis Joplin, Amy Winehouse, Adele and Florence Welch. It was one of Hot Press magazine's 'Albums of the Year' and garnered her a number of heavyweight fans – most notably U2's Bono and Irish trad superstar Sharon Shannon (who invited SON to support her sold out tour of Australia and New Zealand).

When the 30th anniversary of The Joshua Tree came about in March 2017, she was invited to cover one of U2's songs. SON opted for that album's edgy penultimate track ‘Exit’.

The U2 singer Bono told her that her version of his song "took me aback in its simplicity and power... stark and still until it wasn't... He signed his email off with, "Your fan, Bono."

Although she plays the guitar, harmonica, and trumpet, she focuses on singing. Under her own guise Susan has supported Mundy, Paddy Casey, Mick Flannery, Wyvern Lingo, and Sharon Shannon on her 2018 Irish tour.

In 2019, SON toured Australia, Europe, Canada and North America.

==== Baby Talk ====
In 2020, SON teamed up with singer-songwriter Mick Flannery for a duet track "Baby Talk". The song was produced by Tony Buchen and Christian Best.

SON said that: "When I first read the lyrics, I felt that Mick managed to capture a theme and an essence that I have not yet fully explored within my own writing. This song brought me into new territory. What a pleasure to work with Mick."

=== In the Game ===
A collaboration album with artist Mick Flannery, and following the success of their song Baby Talk, the pair released this full album of duets. Recorded during the lockdowns of 2020 remotely with producer Tony Buchen, it reached No. 2 on the official album chart in Ireland. After a closely fought battle for the top spot with Drake, the pair knocked Metallica out of the No. 2 spot and charted ahead of Kanye West's Donda and Olivia Rodrigo's Sour. In the Game received numerous accolades from the press on both sides of the pond with American Songwriter calling it, 'A sorrowful Masterpiece', Irish Times proclaiming, 'Two Stars are Reborn', and UK Publication The Line of Best Fit saying, 'Every song on in the Game takes you on a journey, each player has their moment, each instrument sharing the weight of the record's gloriously heavy sentiment'. The pair toured the record in the U.S. directly after it was released sharing dates with Kathleen Edwards, appearing at the Americana Festival in Nashville, and were also invited to open for Phoebe Bridgers at her Philadelphia show at the Mann Center. Although only releasing towards the latter part of 2021, In the Game achieved the most sales for an independent Irish record in Ireland for 2021.

In the Game saw Susan receive nominations for the Choice Music Prize and the RTÉ Radio 1 Folk Awards for 'Album of the Year', 'Female Folk Artist' of the Year, and take home the Best Original Folk Track award for the collaborative song "Chain Reaction". Susan was also shortlisted for the 'Vanda and Young' Award for her song "These Are the Days". The collaboration album ended up being the biggest-selling Irish independent record of 2021.

=== Now You See It ===
Recorded between Los Angeles, Maine, County Clare and Wexford Ireland during the spring of this year, the EP sees Susan working once again with Tony Buchen (the producer of ‘In The Game’ the 2021 collaboration record with Mick Flannery), Sam Kassirer (Josh Ritter, Lake Street Dive) and her bandmates, brothers Cillian and Lorcan Byrne.

Previously released tracks including the EP's namesake, "Now You See It" and "Truth Can Be Kind", which see Susan reunite with Mick Flannery, which reached No. 1 and No. 3 on the Radio 1 airplay charts, respectively.

Susan's recently finished a two-month tour, which saw her performing on the main stages of beautiful Canadian festivals, debut shows in Los Angeles, headline shows in New York City, opening for Valerie June in the UK and Phoebe Bridgers in Scotland before closing down August on the main stage of Tønder Festival in Denmark.

=== Now in a Minute ===
O'Neill released her third album Now in a Minute on 20 September 2024. She hoped the record would help her "break through to a wider audience".

== Style ==
O'Neill fuses traditional Irish folk with rock, soul, gospel and blues. She has a large range of vocals combined with her guitar technique, her loop pedals and trumpet.

== Discography ==
=== Studio albums ===
Year	Album details	Peak chart positions
Year	Album details	IRL
2018	Found Myself Lost	—
2021	In the Game	2
2022	Now You See It (EP)	—
2024	Now in a Minute	4
"—" denotes releases that did not chart or were not released in that territory.

== Awards ==
- In the Game was shortlisted for the Choice Music Prize in 2021.
- The duo won the "Best Original Folk Track" at the RTÉ Radio 1 Folk Awards twice, for Baby Talk in 2020, and Chain Reaction in 2021.

=== RTÉ Radio 1 Folk Awards ===
Susan has won the Best Original Folk Track three times award at the RTÉ Radio 1 Folk Awards, duetting with Mick Flannery on two occasions.

Year	Nominee / work	Award	Result
2020	"Baby Talk"	Best Original Folk Track	Won
2021	"Chain Reaction"	Best Original Folk Track	Won
2021	In the Game	Best Folk Album	Nominated
2022	"Now You See It"	Best Original Folk Track	Won

=== Choice Music Prize ===
In the Game, Flannery's album with Susan O'Neill was nominated for the Choice Music Prize Album of the Year.

Year	Nominee / work	Award	Result
2021	In the Game	Irish Album of the Year Shortlist 2021	Nominated
