= Susan O'Neill (academic) =

Music educator and scholar

Academic background
- Education: PhD, Keele University
- Thesis: (1996)

Academic work
- Institutions: Simon Fraser University

Susan A. O'Neill is a Professor in Music Education and Equity Studies and Dean in the Faculty of Education at Simon Fraser University (SFU).

== Career ==
O'Neill joined the faculty at Simon Fraser University (SFU) in 2011, after holding academic appointments at universities in Canada and the UK. That year, she received the Miegunyah Distinguished Visiting Fellowship from the University of Melbourne. O'Neill was part of a research project at SFU called RYME (Research for Youth, Music and Education), to encourage youth's involvement with music. In 2012, O'Neill was elected the International Society for Music Education (ISME) Research Commissioner and appointed to the ISME Advocacy Standing Committee. The next year, she became an adjunct professor in the Faculty of Music at Laval University.

Due to her involvement with RYME, O'Neill received the 2015 BCRTA Gold Star Award. In 2016, O'Neill was elected the president of the ISME. Two years later, she was appointed Associate Dean in the Faculty of Education at SFU.
