= Mick Flannery =

Irish singer and songwriter

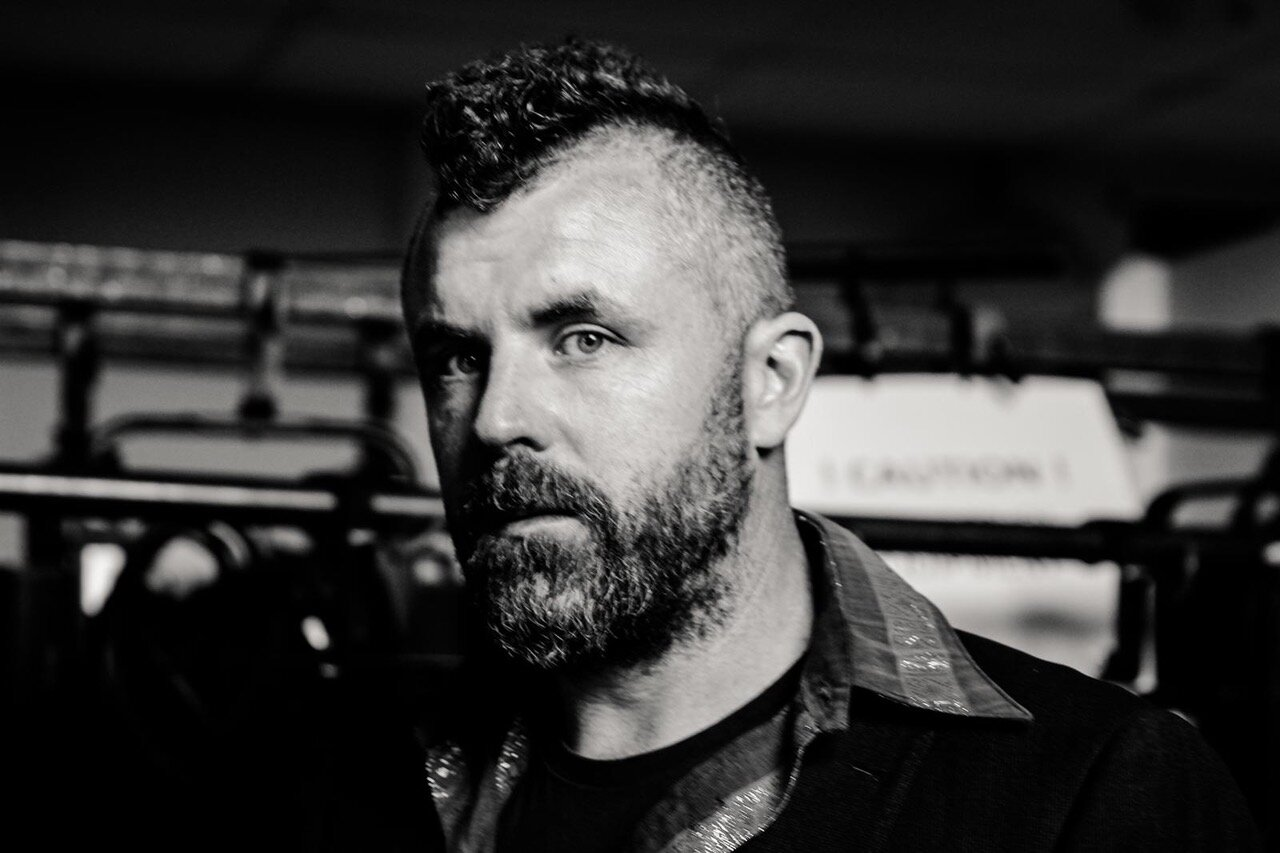
- Image of Mick Flannery

Background information
- Born: 28 November 1983 (age 42)
- Origin: Blarney, County Cork, Ireland
- Occupations: Singer–songwriter, stonemason
- Instruments: Vocals, guitar, piano
- Labels: EMI Records, Universal Records, Warner Music Ireland, Starhouse Collective
- Website: mickflannery.com

Mick Flannery (born 28 November 1983) is an Irish singer and songwriter.

His debut album Evening Train resulted from his time spent studying music and management at Coláiste Stiofáin Naofa in Cork. It featured tracks which had previously won Flannery two categories at the International Songwriting Competition in Nashville, Tennessee. He was the first Irish musician to win in this event. In 2019 this album premiered as a musical by the same name.

Flannery's second studio album White Lies was released on 12 September 2008, achieving a top ten position on the Irish Albums Chart. It later went platinum and was nominated for the Choice Music Prize.

The Irish Times placed him at number forty-six in a list of "The 50 Best Irish Acts Right Now" published in April 2009. Also that year Flannery won Best Irish Male at the 2009 Meteor Awards. Influences include Kurt Cobain, Leonard Cohen and Bob Dylan.

== Early years ==
Flannery grew up outside Blarney, County Cork.

Coming from a family with a keen musical interest, Flannery was introduced to folk and blues music at a young age.

My mother's side were big into music, more than my dad's side. My mother is a singer and she plays the guitar. She recorded an album of her own actually two years ago. And it was her brothers and sisters that kind of got me into music. [...] At those family nights there was a good bit of Tom Waits, a bit of Dylan. Most of the singers would be female, my aunts, and they would sing Tracy Chapman and Joni Mitchell.

Flannery cites an encounter with the music of Kurt Cobain and Nirvana as a direct influence on his desire to become a musician. Seeing Cobain perform "The Man Who Sold the World" on MTV Unplugged he promptly purchased a copy of MTV Unplugged in New York. He soon bought the album Blonde on Blonde as well. Flannery claims to have written his first song at the age of fifteen. His first completed song was called "Mad Man's Road", a tale of a murder which took place on the road in which he lived. He has been dismissive of his earlier material, referring to it as "tripe".

However, he is keen to express his fondness for stonemasonry and its position alongside his music: "I wasn't going to sit in a room and write songs seven days a week and live on bread and beans. I liked doing stonemasonry as well". He still does it on an occasional basis: "We wouldn’t be carving gravestones or anything. We’d do the fronts of houses, entrance walls, stuff like that".

== Career ==
=== Evening Train ===
While undergoing a music and management course at Coláiste Stiofáin Naofa in Cork, Flannery commenced writing the album that would become Evening Train, an eleven-track concept album about the exploits of two brothers. His original intention had been to write a musical but this endeavour proved unsuccessful.

Before its release Flannery and a friend who worked alongside him in the stonemasonry business embarked on a three-month trip to the United States, living in Williamsburg, Brooklyn. Flannery spent his time performing in New York. His sister was present for one of the months and assisted him with organising his performances.

Evening Train was received positively by critics in Ireland and the United States. Reviewers noted its "astute and sophisticated lyrics", its "strong, imaginative melodies", its Tom Waits sound. The RTÉ Guide later said, "His voice was like Tom Waits meets the howling of a grizzled freight train hobo". entertainment.ie reviewer Lauren Murphy described it as "an album dripping with maturity, poise and potential" and that "the most astounding thing" was his age of 21 years.

Flannery signed with EMI Records in 2007. That same year he was the subject of a programme called Mytunes, broadcast on RTÉ Radio 1 on 29 November. He performed on RTÉ Two's Other Voices television programme in 2008. This appearance led to increased interest in Flannery's music in Ireland.

==== Evening Train Musical ====
In June 2019, as part of the Cork Midsummer Festival, The Everyman and Rosa Productions presented the world premiere of Evening Train, a new musical inspired by Mick Flannery's acclaimed concept album of the same name. Flannery’s album, written from different character perspectives, suggests the main figures: two divided brothers, Frank and Luther, and a spirited, forlorn young woman, Grace, all dreaming of some form of escape from dusty realities and unpromising futures in a small town of gamblers and strivers. Playwright Rani Sarma developed this theme into a love triangle saddled with questions of debt and fate, where parents are either haunting absences or demanding presences, and a younger generation stews in fragile promises and ruinous addiction. Gambling being a focus of the musical, the game of bluffs and tells, requires working out characters within a strict economy of expression. The cast of Irish actors consisted of Charlie Bonner, Brian Doherty, Deirdre Donnelly, Ger Kelly, Ian Lloyd Anderson, John McCarthy, Kate Stanley Brennan, with a live band accompanying them consisting of Mick himself.

===== The House Must Win =====
In 2026, Flannery returned to the material from Evening Train with The House Must Win, a revised musical drama directed by Julie Kelleher. The production premiered at the Pavilion Theatre in Dún Laoghaire in April 2026 before transferring to the Everyman Theatre in Cork. The production drew on songs from the original album while adding new material. In advance of the stage premiere, Flannery released a companion double album, The House Must Win, which included reworked songs from Evening Train alongside new compositions arranged by Liam Robinson, who previously worked on Hadestown. The cast included Tommy Tiernan, Tabitha Smyth, Ferdia Walsh-Peelo, Niall McNamee and Damien Kearney. Reviews discussed the production's western-style setting and the score's movement across folk, jazz, blues, country and rock.

=== White Lies ===
Flannery's second studio album White Lies was released on 12 September 2008, achieving a top ten position on the Irish Albums Chart and later going platinum in Ireland. On the day of the album's release Flannery performed "Tomorrow's Papers" on The Late Late Show. The song contributed to the increasing popularity of the singer-songwriter. entertainment.ie's Lauren Murphy said: "White Lies may not be a perfect album, but it's certainly a promising step forward for a real talent". RTÉ reviewer Harry Guerin commented: "If you're adamant that Ireland may sink with another singer-songwriter on tour, then this is a record to seek out; you won't notice the time passing and the nation will remain afloat".

Flannery began a tour of Ireland after the release of White Lies. He performed a duet of "Christmas Past" with Lisa Hannigan in December 2008 after Today FM's Tony Fenton paired them together for a radio show broadcast from a rooftop. He joined Hannigan at a show in Vicar Street to perform the same duet that month. "Tomorrow's Paper" was translated into the Irish language for a CD titled Ceol '09, an annual compilation released by Seachtain na Gaeilge. The Irish version was recorded in forty minutes at a studio in Dublin's Merrion Square. Flannery performed a cover version of "The River" on The Ray D'Arcy Show's Discover Ireland Feel Good Tour stopover in Carlingford and Cooley Peninsula in March 2009. A deluxe edition of White Lies, which featured a duet of the song "Christmas Past" with Kate Walsh, was released in 2009.

Flannery's largest headlining performance in Dublin at this stage occurred at Vicar Street on 25 May 2009. He performed alongside John Spillane at Live at the Marquee in Cork on 9 July 2009. Flannery said being asked to perform there was "daunting [...] In many ways I have drifted into this career and still have to pinch myself regularly to make sure I am not imagining it all". He also performed at the Bloom Festival as part of the 50th anniversary celebrations of The Rose of Tralee in 2009. He made an appearance on the Crawdaddy Stage at Electric Picnic 2009. On 31 December 2009, he performed a date at the Cork Opera House as part of celebrations marking the end of the decade. He has sold out several other venues around Ireland and has also toured the UK.

=== Red to Blue ===
Flannery released his third studio album, Red to Blue, on 30 March 2012. It spent three weeks at number one in the Irish Albums Chart and singles "Gone Forever" and "No Way To Live" enjoyed a lot of airplay. His song Up The Hill was covered by Shawn Colvin and Emmylou Harris.

The Red to Blue tour was a major success for Flannery, featuring sold-out shows all over Ireland, most notably the Olympia Theatre in Dublin, one of Flannery's biggest venues to date. The tour finished with two sold-out shows at the Róisín Dubh in Galway.

By The Rule

Flannery's fourth album reached number one in the Irish Album Charts.

=== I Own You ===
The fifth instalment from Mick Flannery was released on 14 October 2016. The album is described as having '50% more social awareness' than his previous album.

The title track "I Own You" was featured in "Tin Star" featuring Tim Roth in season 2 episode 1 Prairie Gothic.

Game of Thrones' Aidan Gillen starred in the music video of Mick Flannery's song Cameo.

=== Rosaleen ===
In 2018 Mick Flannery released a charity single for a women's support agency. All proceeds from the single 'Rosaleen' went to the National Women’s Council of Ireland. 'Rosaleen' was premiered in May when Flannery performed the track live on RTE Radio One’s 'Ray D'Arcy Show'. He was accompanied by his Aunt Yvonne for this performance.

=== Mickmas Volume 1 ===
Mickmas Volume 1 was a four track EP that was Flannery's first independently released album. All songs on this EP were written by Mick Flannery, Except 'I have a darkness' written by Casey Black. All songs recorded and mixed by Christian Best at Monique Studios. 150 copies were made available to purchase online, with the remainder only available at live shows throughout December 2018.

A donation from the sale of this EP was made to Pieta House.

=== Mick Flannery ===
On 5 July 2019, Mick Flannery's self titled album was released. Mick touches on loose themes of ambition and the search for a meaningful life in the context of a musician’s sometimes feckless and dysfunctional lifestyle. This self titled album was mainly recorded in LA with Australian producer Tony Buchen between July and November 2018. This featured two co-writes with ESCQ of his songs Come Find Me and Fool. This record has debuted at No. 1 on the Irish Charts. This made him the first independent Irish artist to reach the top since January 2018, and the third homegrown Irish act to hit the helm of the Top 50 this year, following Picture This' MDRN LV and Hozier's Wasteland, Baby!.

=== Mickmas Volume 2 ===
December 2019 saw the second addition to Flannery's four track Christmas EP. Mickmas Volume 2 included the titles Somebody else, Just like me, Rising tide and Lisadell.

A donation from the sale of this EP was made to Cool Earth.

=== Run a Mile ===
In May 2020, Mick Flannery teamed up with New York-based director Samantha Scaffidi to collaborate on Run a Mile, a new song and video to raise funds Women’s Aid, a national frontline organisation helping victims of domestic abuse. By re-contextualising Scaffidi's short film 'BOUND' accompanied by Flannery's song, they made effort to raise awareness of domestic abuse during the COVID-19 lockdown. Flannery says ""This song was written as an attempt to empathise with a woman who has lived with disappointing men all her life, from her own father to the father of her child, to subsequent relationships."

=== Alive - Cork Opera House ===
Mick Flannery's seventh album, 'Alive - Cork Opera House', was released on 24 July 2020. This project, a lot less premeditated than normal, is a reaction to the Covid-19 pandemic’s decimation of the live music sector. This fully independent release sees all proceeds shared among Flannery's band and crew. Capturing the magic combination of raw talent, nervous energy, and deadpan, self-deprecating humour that makes his gigs so special, the album serves not only as a celebration of the joy of live music, as well as support in the fallout of lockdown. The album is a compilation of 17 tracks ranging from his earliest work in Evening Train to his most recent self titled album. This album joined many of his past ones in going straight to No. 1 in the Irish Independent Charts.

=== Mickmas Volume 3 ===
December 2020 saw the addition to Flannery's Christmas EP, Mickmas Volume 3. The single "Minnesota" on this album saw a collaboration between Mick and Anaïs Mitchell. All proceeds from this went to Fair Fight in aid of voting rights. Anaïs describes Mick Flannery as one of her "very favourite writers in the world."

=== In the Game ===
In 2021, Flannery released In the Game, a collaborative album with Irish singer-songwriter Susan O'Neill. The album followed their earlier duet "Baby Talk" and was recorded remotely during the COVID-19 lockdowns with producer Tony Buchen. In the Game reached number two on the Irish Albums Chart and was shortlisted for the 2021 Choice Music Prize. The album was also nominated for Best Folk Album at the RTÉ Radio 1 Folk Awards, where its single "Chain Reaction" won Best Original Folk Track. The album received positive reviews from several publications. American Songwriter described it as "a sorrowful masterpiece", while The Line of Best Fit praised the record's duet structure and arrangements. Flannery and O'Neill toured the album internationally, including dates in the United States and an appearance at AmericanaFest in Nashville. In 2025, the pair announced In The Game - Live 2021–2025, a live album documenting performances from the project, alongside a new run of tour dates in Ireland and the United Kingdom.

=== Night at the Opera ===
In February 2022 Mick released A Night at the Opera, an album depicting some of history's most famous chess games. The songs on the album are structured by following the moves of these games, each piece having a corresponding musical chord. The lyrics of the songs deal primarily with the often complex lives of the grandmasters. 20% of all profits go to effective altruism. This album was accompanied by an NFT minted on 22 February. These consisted of videos illustrating how these chess matches formed the songs.

== Personal life ==
Mick interviewed on, Sunday with Miriam, RTE radio 1 show July 2025, said has 3 children daughters aged 16 & 3 year old and a 9 month old baby boy.

Flannery's sister Sarah Flannery is a past winner of the Esat Young Scientist Exhibition. His mother's family live in Coolroe near Killarney.

Flannery is left-handed.

== Band members ==
=== Current ===
- Mick Flannery – Vocals, piano, guitar
- Karen O'Doherty – Violin, keys, vocals
- Yvonne Daly – Vocals
- Alan Comerford – Electric guitar, vocals
- Phil Christie - Piano, keyboards, vocals
- Mike O'Connell – Bass guitar
- Christian Best – Drums

=== Collaborators ===
- Susan O'Neill
- Christy Skulls
- Anais Mitchell

=== Former ===
- Aaron Dillon – Harmonica (notably "In the Gutter" from the album Evening Train)
- Brian Hassett – Bass guitar, Double bass

== Discography ==
=== Studio albums ===
Year	Album details	Peak chart positions
Year	Album details	IRL
2007	Evening Train: Released: 22 March 2007; Label: EMI; Formats: LP, CD, download	84
2008	White Lies: Released: 18 September 2008; Label: EMI; Formats: CD, download	6
2012	Red to Blue: Released: 30 March 2012; Label: EMI; Formats: CD, download	1
2014	By the Rule: Released: 9 May 2014; Label: EMI; Formats: CD, download	1
2016	I Own You: Released: 14 October 2016; Label: EMI; Formats: CD, download	3
2019	Mick Flannery: Released: 5 July 2019; Label: Warner Music, Rosa Productions, Star House Collective; Formats: CD, download, streaming	1
2020	Alive – Cork Opera House: Released: 24 July 2020; Formats: CD, download, streaming	3
2021	In the Game (with Susan O'Neill): Released: 10 September 2021; Formats: CD, download, streaming	2
2022	Night at the Opera: Released: 22 February 2022; Formats: Streaming	—
2023	Goodtime Charlie: Released: 15 September 2023; Formats: Streaming	2
2026	The House Must Win: Released: 15 September 2023; Formats: Streaming	13
"—" denotes releases that did not chart or were not released in that territory.

=== Extended plays ===
- Mick Flannery EP (2002)

== Awards ==
The Irish Times placed him at number forty-six in a list of "The 50 Best Irish Acts Right Now" published in April 2009, commenting on his album White Lies: "With this stunning exhibition of the gravel-voiced musician's abilities, Flannery turned his hand to mournful piano ballads and catchy guitar tunes with a flair that far surpasses his 25 years".

=== International Songwriting competition ===
Flannery won in two categories in the International Songwriting Competition in Nashville, Tennessee: "In the Gutter" in the category of Folk Singer-Songwriter and "The Tender" in the category of Lyrics Only. This came from a panel of judges which featured several renowned songwriters, including Flannery's idol, Tom Waits. He was the first Irish musician to win in this competition. The two songs featured on the album Evening Train.

Year	Nominee / work	Award	Result
2004	"In the Gutter"	Folk Singer-Songwriter	Won
2004	"The Tender"	Lyrics Only	Won

=== Hot Press Reader's Poll ===
Flannery was Hot Press's Most Promising Act in its 2009 Reader's Poll.

Year	Nominee / work	Award	Result
2009	Mick Flannery	Most Promising Act	Won

=== Meteor Music Awards ===
Flannery won Best Irish Male at the 2009 Meteor Awards. The result was unexpected as beforehand the winner was anticipated to be Duke Special or Jape.

Year	Nominee / work	Award	Result
2009	Mick Flannery	Best Irish Male	Won

=== Choice Music Prize ===
In 2009, Flannery was nominated for the Choice Music Prize. He was one of seven of the ten nominated acts to perform at the award ceremony in Vicar Street on 4 March.

Flannery lost to Jape, though he was mentioned in the acceptance speech, as frontman Richie Egan mentioned what his mother had told him before the award: "They all deserve the award – sure my mother even told me that Mick Flannery was going to win, she said you're good, Ritchie [sic], but he's gorgeous".

In The Game, Flannery's album with Susan O'Neill was nominated for the Choice Music Prize Album of the Year.

Year	Nominee / work	Award	Result
2009	White Lies	Irish Album of the Year 2008	Nominated
2020	Mick Flannery	Irish Album of the Year 2019	Nominated
2021	In The Game	Irish Album of the Year Shortlist 2021	Nominated

=== RTÉ Radio 1 Folk Awards ===
Flannery has twice won the Best Original Folk Track award at the RTÉ Radio 1 Folk Awards, duetting with Susan O'Neill on both occasions.

Year	Nominee / work	Award	Result
2018	"Rosaleen"	Best Original Folk Track	Nominated
2020	"Baby Talk"	Best Original Folk Track	Won
2020	Mick Flannery	Best Folk Singer	Nominated
2021	"Chain Reaction"	Best Original Folk Track	Won
2021	"In the Game"	Best Folk Album	Nominated
