= Lovebox Dublin =

- Lovebox Dublin 2008 promotional poster
- Genre: Rock, dance, soul
- Dates: 23 August
- Locations: Malahide Castle, Dublin, Ireland; Marlay Park, Dublin, Ireland
- Years active: 2007 - 2008
- Website: www.lovebox.net/dublin

Lovebox Dublin was a one-day music festival that took place in Dublin, Ireland in 2007 and 2008. The 2007 event took place in Malahide Castle on Saturday 21 July with the 2008 event taking place in Marlay Park on Saturday 23 August . Bacardi sponsored the festival and MCD promoted it. In 2007, it had four stages, but in 2008 it had seven stages.

== 2007 festival ==
Tickets for the 2007 event were priced €79.50 and the event began at 1 p.m. at Malahide Castle on Saturday 21 July.

== 2008 festival ==
The 2008 event took place on 23 August, relocating to Marlay Park in Dublin. The bill included Maxïmo Park, N*E*R*D, Paolo Nutini, Sam Sparro, Kid Creole and the Coconuts, Plain White T's and the Gorillaz Sound System (performing a ‘DVJ Set’ on a specially constructed stage). Early bird tickets went on sale at 9 a.m. on Friday 27 June, priced €49.20. In addition to the musical fare on offer, there was also a traditional organic farmers market, fun fair, kids area, fortress style rotunda in the woods and other extracurricular fun.

Gates opened at 2 pm.
