= Donal Dineen =

Irish broadcaster (born 1969)

- Born: Donal Dineen; 5 May 1969 (age 57); County Kerry, Ireland
- Presenting career
- Show: Small Hours
- Station: Today FM
- Time slot: Weekdays, 00:00 - 02:00
- Style: Disc jockey
- Country: Ireland
- Previous show: Here Comes the Night
- Website: web.archive.org/web/20080916080218/http://www.todayfm.com/sectional.asp?id=905

Donal Dineen (born 5 May 1969) is an Irish radio presenter, photographer, film maker and former television presenter from County Kerry. Until recently he presented an assortment of loud ' noise/ electronica and world music on his Small Hours (formerly Here Comes the Night) late-night radio show on Today FM. This show has now been cancelled for commercial reasons. He is also known for presenting the now defunct No Disco TV series on Network 2.

== Career ==
Dineen studied communications in Dublin City University. It was here that he first picked up a camera as it was part of his course. From this point onwards he developed a fascination with the visual image. His first exhibition, This Storm is an Angel, for Galway Arts Festival in 1993, was a series of photographs taken around his home in Kerry, which focused on family, place and identity. 2009 exhibitions include an installation for the Dublin Electronic Arts Festival (DEAF) entitled Words Are Something Else, and solo photographic shows for Kilkenny Arts Festival and The Joinery Gallery, Dublin.

Musically, Dineen is credited with breaking David Gray amongst other artists in Ireland. His programme, Here Comes The Night, was first aired on the opening day of Radio Ireland (now Today FM)'s existence, 17 March 1997. He later moved to the Small Hours show, which broadcast between Monday and Thursday in the midnight - 2AM slot.

On 30 December 2007, The Small Hours had a two-hour radio special broadcast from the living room of David Gray's London home, where Gray and Liam Ó Maonlaí traded songs and stories on the piano and acoustic guitar, "intermittently picking their Desert Island discs for Dineen to spin". Dineen also had a line-up in the Body & Soul area of Electric Picnic 2008.

As a curator, Dineen has worked on several musical series, most significantly A Month of Sundays which was devised with The Model Arts and Niland Gallery Sligo in 2006 and evolved into a touring series in 2007.

In November 2009 he curated a mini festival called Fresh Air which profiled "his selection of the most exciting and experimental sound makers working today. The aim is to bring to light the sheer diversity and calibre of music being made on these shores, and to bring new music, live or recorded, to air".

In addition to presenting a show on Today FM, Dineen has also presented programs on TXFM, a regional station that broadcasts to Dublin and the surrounding areas and which is also a sister station to Today FM. Dineen is also a lecturer at Dundalk Institute of Technology, where he lectures on Photography and Radio.

Aside from his musical career, Dineen played Gaelic football with Rathmore GAA.
