= 2009 in Irish music =

This is a summary of the year 2009 in the Irish music industry.

== Summary ==
=== January ===
- On 6 January, it was revealed that a track from Enya's album And Winter Came... was to feature in a Japanese television drama. "Dreams Are More Precious" is the theme tune for Arifureta Kiseki, the first episode of which aired on Fuji Television on 8 January.
- On 14 January, the nominations for the Choice Music Prize were announced.
- From January 15–17, The Coronas and Fight Like Apes represented Ireland in the Eurosonic Festival in Groningen, Netherlands. Former Clann Zú member Declan de Barra also performed, having received an invitation directly from the organisers.
- On 16 January, State, launched in March 2008, announced it was to cease publication of its print edition due to difficulties in attracting advertising revenue. It said it would continue as an online entity.
- On 18 January, U2 were amongst the performers at the concert preceding Barack Obama's inauguration as the 44th President of the United States. They played "Pride (In the Name of Love)", a song which references the assassination of Martin Luther King Jr., and "City of Blinding Lights".
- On 19 January, Dave Fanning conducted the worldwide premiere of the U2 single "Get on Your Boots" on The Colm & Jim-Jim Breakfast Show on RTÉ 2fm.
- On 20 January, it was reported that thousands of euro worth of equipment owned by the band Fred had been stolen from their van parked across from Anglesea Garda Station in Cork, just as the band were to begin a North American tour. The missing gear was recovered within 48 hours.
- On 28 January, the 2009 Meteor Music Awards was launched and the nominations announced.
- Also on 28 January, Kings of Leon became the first act scheduled to appear at Oxegen 2009 to be announced. It was the second consecutive year in which this occurred.
- On 30 January, four more acts were announced for Oxegen 2009. These were Snow Patrol, Katy Perry, Bloc Party and The Script.

=== February ===
- On 1 February, the Irish Music Rights Organisation (IMRO) took over the administration of the rights of the Irish mechanical rights society, MCPSI.
- On 5 February, the reformed Blur were announced as one of Oxegen 2009's headliners in what will be their only Irish appearance of the year and their first in Ireland since three shows in the Olympia Theatre, Dublin in 2003.
- The Priest Feast Tour featuring Judas Priest, Megadeth and Testament played two Irish shows in February 2009, prior to the start of its seven-concert UK run. The dates were February 10 at the O_{2} in Dublin and February 11 at the Odyssey Arena in Belfast.
- On 12 February, RTÉ 2XM featured the world premiere of the title track from U2's No Line on the Horizon album.
- On Friday, 13 February, the Irish-owned music channel Bubble Hits burst.
- Also on 13 February, ten more acts were announced for Oxegen 2009: Pete Doherty, Razorlight, Nick Cave and the Bad Seeds, Elbow, Yeah Yeah Yeahs, The Ting Tings, White Lies, Fight Like Apes, Pendulum and Jason Mraz.
- On 15 February, the Irish Film and Television Awards took place in the Burlington Hotel in Dublin. David Holmes won an IFTA for his Hunger score, whilst Maria Doyle Kennedy won in the Best Supporting Actress category for her part in The Tudors.
- On 16 February, the 20-store Irish music retail chain, Golden Discs, entered examinership with debts of €9.5 million.
- On 19 February, a new batch of acts, including Blondie, Simple Minds, Crosby, Stills & Nash, Bell X1, Des Bishop and Mick Flannery/John Spillane, were announced for Live at the Marquee in Cork.
- Kaiser Chiefs did the O_{2} on 19 February, with support from Black Kids.
- The Killers played the O_{2}, Dublin on February 20, 2009, as part of a UK and Ireland arena tour. Tickets for the entire tour sold out within hours after going on sale on 10 October 2008. The band opened the show with their single "Spaceman", with the encore including "When You Were Young".
- U2 brought London to a standstill on 27 February, the same day of the Irish release of their album No Line on the Horizon. The band performed a surprise rooftop show in front of 5,000 fans during the evening rush hour on top of the Broadcasting House in Regent Street, consisting of the songs "Get on Your Boots", "Magnificent", "Vertigo" and "Beautiful Day".
- Snow Patrol did the O_{2} on 28 February.

=== March ===
- U2 released their twelfth studio album No Line on the Horizon internationally on 2 March 2009. It was released in five editions – standard CD, double vinyl and three limited editions. The band then embarked on a world tour following the release of what was the follow-up to their 2004 album, How to Dismantle an Atomic Bomb. It was claimed that the band would play three shows in Croke Park, Dublin in front of 240,000 people. In January the band warned fans against buying fake concert tickets from bogus websites. From 2 – 6 March, the band partake in a week-long residency on the Late Show with David Letterman, a television talk show in the United States.
- On 3 March, eleven new acts were added to the line-up for Oxegen 2009. These were Lady Gaga, Manic Street Preachers, Florence and the Machine, TV on the Radio, The Game, Ladyhawke, James, Foals, Of Montreal, Friendly Fires and Squeeze.
- On 4 March, the Choice Music Prize for Irish Album of the Year 2008 was awarded to Jape for the album, Ritual, during a live ceremony at Vicar Street, Dublin.
- On 5 March, Oxegen 2009 was officially launched, with an initial stage breakdown unveiled and a number of new acts announced. These included Nine Inch Nails, Jane's Addiction, Pet Shop Boys, Glasvegas, The Saturdays, Doves, Eagles of Death Metal and God Is an Astronaut.
- On 9 March, U2 announced details of their World Stadium Tour with approximately 25 shows in Europe and 25 in North America before Christmas. European ticket sales commenced on 14 – 15 March with the Irish leg due to consist of a three-night run in Croke Park, Dublin on 24, 25, 27 July. The band said they would play surrounded by their audience.
- From 13 to 22 March, nearly twenty Irish acts performed at South by Southwest in Austin, Texas, United States.
- On 17 March, the 2009 Meteor Awards took place at the RDS in Dublin. The Script won two awards, Best Irish Band and Best Irish Band for their self-titled debut album.
- Also on 17 March, "In the Name of the Grandfather", an episode of The Simpsons guest starring Glen Hansard premiered in Ireland ahead of its U.S. broadcast, the first time that this had ever happened. The episode sees the Simpsons travelling to Ireland where a drunken Homer and Grandpa buy a pub.
- On 20 March, tickets for U2's first two Croke Park shows on 24 and 25 July sold out within forty minutes of going on sale, with a third show announced within five days.
- According to the Daily Mirror, Tina Turner would perform two shows at the newly refurbished Point Theatre, Dublin in 2009. A third concert was added at a later date. Tickets were expected to go on sale in August 2008 and might have cost up to €150. Hot Press concluded that Turner would be in Dublin for a theatre show in March 2009 but was less certain of the venue, stating that it was likely to take place at the refurbished Point. Turner, who officially retired from live performance eight years ago, decided to tour again after performing at the Grammys with Beyoncé. “The response was overwhelming,” she said. “Everywhere I went people were asking me when I was going back on tour again. So after a lot of thought and planning we announced an American tour. Now Europe beckons!” On 28 August 2008, after three months of uncertainty, a 26 March date was announced, with tickets (priced between €91.25 and €156.25) going on sale on Thursday 4 September 2008.

=== April ===
- On 15 April, Electric Picnic 2009 was launched, with acts announced including Orbital, The Flaming Lips, Basement Jaxx, Madness, Klaxons, Bell X1, Fleet Foxes and MGMT.
- On 17 April, tickets for Electric Picnic 2009 went on sale.
- On 18 April, AC/DC played the O_{2}, Dublin as part of their Black Ice World Tour. When tickets, priced €67.70, went on sale on 17 October 2008 – the same day that their first studio album in eight years, Black Ice, was released in Ireland – they sold out within two minutes flat.
- On 22 April, the line-up for Castlepalooza 2009 was announced, including David Kitt, Dark Room Notes, Project Jenny, Project Jan, R.S.A.G., Channel One, Robotnik, The Lost Brothers, Noise Control, 8 Ball, Glint and Le Galaxie.
- On 28 April, Calvin Harris, Noisettes, The Saw Doctors, The Coronas, The Blizzards, The Answer, The Horrors, Iglu & Hartly, Starsailor and Spinnerette were added to the Oxegen 2009 line-up. La Roux cancelled citing "touring commitments.

=== May ===
- On 5 May, the full line-up for 2009's Slane Concert was announced. It included The Prodigy, Kasabian and The Blizzards being announced as support acts for headliner, Oasis.
- On 5–6 May, Bob Dylan played two shows at the O_{2}, Dublin.
- On 7 May, more dance acts, including Felix da Housecat and The Japanese Popstars, were announced for Oxegen 2009.
- On 13 May, Brian Wilson, Röyksopp, Amadou & Mariam, The Wailers, Fionn Regan, Mundy, James Murphy and Pat Mahoney of LCD Soundsystem, A Flock of Seagulls, Bell Orchestre, The Field, Jeffrey Lewis, Marina and the Diamonds and Richmond Fontaine were announced for Electric Picnic 2009.
- On 14 May, the 2009 Indie-pendence was launched, with headliners Super Furry Animals and Ocean Colour Scene amongst the initial acts announced. Admission fees were charged for the first time as the festival lost its free status.
- Also on 14 May, Therapy?, Tinchy Stryder, Boys Noize and Fever Ray (Karin Dreijer Andersson of The Knife) were all announced for Oxegen 2009.
- From 14 to 17 May, The Great Escape took place in Brighton, England. Irish acts to perform included Bell X1, Villagers, And So I Watch You from Afar, Fight Like Apes, Valerie Francis, Panama Kings, Angel Pier, Iain Archer and General Fiasco.
- On 29 May, the line-up for the 2009 Le Chéile was announced, featuring Lisa Hannigan, Delorentos, Fight Like Apes, Mundy, Declan O'Rourke and Jason Byrne.

=== June ===
- Ex Revs front man Rory Gallagher won the award of Best Album of 2009 from Lanzarote's English language radio station UKawayFM for his solo album God Bless the Big Bang.
- On 6 June, Elton John played Thomond Park in Limerick.
- On June 12, Def Leppard and Whitesnake played the O2 Arena with support from Journey and Tesla.
- On June 13, Take That played Croke Park with support from The Script.
- Slane 2009 took place on 20 June. It was headlined by Oasis with support from The Prodigy. Kasabian, Glasvegas and The Blizzards also performed.
- Live at the Marquee took place in Cork in June and July.
- On 22 June, the full line-up for Indie-pendence was announced. Panama Kings, Pocket Promise, SetMaker, Nicole Maguire and Gillian Verrechia were added on 26 June 2009.
- The death of Michael Jackson on 25 June 2009 led to reactions from Ireland. Hot Press made its three Jackson covers (from 1984, 1987 and 1988) available for download and promised to upload the interviews to its site. Louis Walsh, a fan, told Hot Press that he "purposely avoided the media in the immediate aftermath of Jackson's death, as he didn't want to be quoted as an expert on the life of a man he'd only met once". Mick Pyro dubbed Jackson "the best singer who ever sang on record". The Edge spoke of meeting him.
- From 26 to 28 June, several Irish musical acts performed at Glastonbury Festival, including Fight Like Apes (Queen's Head Stage on 28 June), General Fiasco (John Peel Stage on 26 June), Lisa Hannigan, Two Door Cinema Club, Imelda May, Sharon Corr, In Case of Fire and The Script.
- AC/DC played Punchestown Racecourse, County Kildare on 28 June, their biggest Irish show to date and their first in the country since 1996. It was described beforehand as "one of the biggest outdoor concerts of the summer". They were supported by Thin Lizzy and The Answer. Thin Lizzy later cancelled after drummer Tommy Aldridge broke his collarbone in a cycling accident, with The Blizzards taking their place at short notice.
- On 30 June, U2 began their U2 360° Tour, their first world tour for three years, with a show at the Camp Nou in Barcelona. They played under a fifty metre tall "claw" covered in lasers in front of 90,000 people. Dave Fanning described it as "perfect, you couldn't ask for more [...] fantastic [...] an amazing show".

=== July ===
- On 4 July, Rod Stewart played Thomond Park in Limerick.
- Oxegen 2009 took place from July 10–12 at Punchestown Racecourse in Naas, County Kildare.
- On 12 July, Bruce Springsteen played the RDS in Dublin. The show began at 20:05 and lasted for three hours, with thirty songs being played.
- U2 360° Tour at Croke Park
  - U2 played Croke Park, Dublin on 24, 25 and 27 July, supported by Glasvegas and Damien Dempsey, Kaiser Chiefs and Republic of Loose, Bell X1 and The Script respectively. RTÉ 2fm played archived interviews with Dave Fanning from 1979 to 2009 before the shows began.
  - Gates opened at 18:00 for the first show on the 24th, with 23 songs being performed, including "The Unforgettable Fire" (rarely played live), and references to Brendan Behan, The Beatles, The Clash, The Corrs, The Rolling Stones and a speech by Archbishop Desmond Tutu included on the night. Those in attendance wore a mask bearing the image of Aung San Suu Kyi when U2 played their song "Walk On", whilst there was a tribute to Ronnie Drew as well. Bono referred to Hill 16 as the "rubble of revolution". The last songs of the night were "With or Without You" and "Moment of Surrender".
  - The final show on the 26th coincided with heavy traffic as a result of the rush hour, the opening of an IKEA store in Ballymun and a new bus gate operating for the first time in College Green.
  - There were protests afterwards by disgruntled residents who objected to the quick dismantling of the stage in preparation for several football matches scheduled to take place at the venue the following weekend. There were fears that the next show on the tour in Gothenburg would have to be cancelled due to the delay.
  - Fourteen U2 albums occupied the Irish Albums Chart following their Croke Park shows, whilst The Script, one of the acts who supported U2, reached 52 consecutive weeks in the same chart on 7 August.
- On 21 July, Lisa Hannigan's Sea Sew album was nominated for the Mercury Prize. It lost to Speech Debelle's Speech Therapy album on 8 September 2009.
- Le Chéile took place in Oldcastle, County Meath from 28 July until 3 August, featuring artists such as Lisa Hannigan, Mundy, Declan O'Rourke, Delorentos and Fight Like Apes.
- On 30 July, Hot Press.com and RTÉ.ie hosted a live web transmission by Arctic Monkeys which featured tracks from their third album, Humbug. RTÉ.ie also webcast the animated video for Coldplay single "Strawberry Swing".
- On 30 July, Noel Hogan revealed in a Hot Press interview that he had been sending "a few little bits" to fellow member of The Cranberries, Dolores O'Riordan, and indicated that the band may reform.

=== August ===
- Metallica played Marlay Park, Dublin on 1 August in a show originally intended for Fairyhouse. Support was provided by Avenged Sevenfold, Alice in Chains, and Mastodon. The performance by Alice in Chains was named as the Ticket Gig of the Week by The Irish Times.
- Fatboy Slim played Marlay Park, Dublin on 2 August, with support from David Guetta, Dizzee Rascal and Calvin Harris. Zane Lowe was also due to appear but pulled out due to illness and was replaced with Bitches with Wolves. Fatboy Slim's first song at Marlay Park was "Praise You".
- On 6 August, the line-up for Cois Fharraige was announced, with tickets going on sale on 11 August. It featured acts such as Doves, The Zutons, Newton Faulkner, Noah and the Whale, The Hold Steady, Stereo MCs, The Lightning Seeds and Jerry Fish & The Mudbug Club. The Blizzards and Laura Izibor were later added on 21 August.
- On 8 August, U2 topped the Billboard Hot Tours list after five shows in the Amsterdam ArenA and Croke Park which grossed $41.3 million, more than twice as much as Madonna in second place.
- On 14 August, it was thought that U2 had set a new attendance record for a Wembley Stadium concert during the first UK show of their U2 360° Tour. The previous figure was 5,000 less and was set in 1995 by Rod Stewart then equalled by Foo Fighters in 2008.
- On 23 August, Snow Patrol headlined V Festival in Hylands Park, UK, after Oasis cancelled with viral laryngitis.

=== September ===
- On 3 September, Peter Crawley of The Irish Times wrote a negative review of a Chris de Burgh concert in the Gaiety Theatre, Dublin in that newspaper. De Burgh later circulated a letter attacking the review and reviewer.
- Electric Picnic 2009 took place from September 4–6.
- Cois Fharraige took place from 11 – 13 September.
- On 14 September, Coldplay played the Phoenix Park in Dublin. Elbow and White Lies supported.
- On 23 September 2009, a report from the UK's Music Week revealed that The Corrs album Talk on Corners was the twentieth best selling album in that country's chart history and the top selling Irish album there. Albums by Snow Patrol and U2 also featured in the top fifty.
- 24 September—Arthur's Day: The 250th anniversary of the signing of a lease by Arthur Guinness for a brewery at St James's Gate in Dublin. Events organised by Diageo get underway in Dublin, Kuala Lumpur, Lagos, New York and Yaoundé. International performers who came to Dublin for the occasion included Tom Jones, Ronnie Wood, The Kooks, Paolo Nutini and The Enemy. The British music magazine NME referred to it as a "piss-up in a brewery".
- On 24 September, U2 set a new all-time attendance record of 84,472 at their second concert at New York City's Giants Stadium during the American leg of their U2 360° Tour. They beat a previous record set by Pope John Paul II in 1995, announcing their achievement from the stage. They also announced their first ever appearances in Russia and Turkey for 2010. British fans, upon noticing a lack of any further dates in their country, began to speculate about the possibility of U2 "hitting the festival circuit" as the music weekly NME termed it.

=== October ===
- On 3–4 October, The Music Show took place at the RDS, Dublin.
- On 5 October, The Cranberries announced their first live shows since their reformation, a 19-date tour across several cities in Canada and the United States.
- On 10 October, Boyzone singer Stephen Gately dies while on holiday with partner Andrew Cowles in Majorca. He was 33.
- On 13 October, the reformed Spandau Ballet played the O_{2}, Dublin in the first date of their planned world tour.
- On 16 October, Dublin to Gaza – "One concert, two cities", a benefit concert being held in aid of the Gaza Strip's latest bombardment by Israel, took place in Dublin and be broadcast live in Gaza City. It was organised by documentary maker Dearbhla Glynn and featured performances from artists such as Kíla, Liam Ó Maonlaí and Shadia Mansour.
- From 16 to 18 October, Hard Working Class Heroes took place.
- On 25 October, U2 had their U2 360° Tour show from the Rose Bowl in Pasadena, California, U.S., streamed live on YouTube in sixteen countries, including Ireland.
- On 31 October, a statue was erected in Tralee and an album, A Friend of Mine, was released in memory of Christie Hennessy as the second anniversary in December 2007 approaches.

=== November ===
- On 5 November, U2 performed a mini-concert comprising four songs at the Brandenburg Gate in Germany to celebrate the twentieth anniversary of the fall of the Berlin Wall as part of the MTV Europe Music Awards. A special wall was built to keep any unwanted people out for the occasion.
- On 6 November, The Killers released Live from the Royal Albert Hall. The live DVD features footage from their headlining performance at Oxegen 2009.
- On 15 November, Yusuf Islam opened his first world tour in 33 years at The O2, giving his debut Irish concert. The show was controversial, with many audience members walking out in protest at the performance. Yusuf returned to discuss the controversy on The Late Late Show the following month.

=== December ===
- On 1 December, Vicar Street and Cyprus Avenue were the main winners at the Live Music Venue of The Year Awards.
- On 3 and 5 December, Horslips played their first live shows since 1980, at the Odyssey Arena, Belfast and the O_{2}, Dublin.
- On 4 December, early bird tickets for the 2010 Electric Picnic and Oxegen music festivals went on sale. Oxegen tickets went on sale at 2007 prices as the organisers attempted to generate interest.
- On 8 December, Sinéad O'Connor, in a letter to Hot Press, asked for the resignations of Pope Benedict XVI and Taoiseach Brian Cowen and for the Papal Nuncio to be expelled by the Government of Ireland, saying Church officials were "not fit to call themselves representatives of Christ. They represent nothing but evil anymore" and that Cowen had "no testicles in the matter" of clerical sexual abuse of children.
- On 10 December, Depeche Mode played the O_{2}, Dublin. Tickets went on sale on 27 March, with 6,000 being sold within forty minutes.
- On 12 December, The Blizzards played the Olympia Theatre, Dublin, in their biggest headline show to date. The show sold out several months in advance. They were supported by Ever27.
- On 20 December, Paul McCartney played the O_{2}, Dublin, in his first Irish concert since his May 2003 concert which was his first Irish show since he played with The Beatles in the 1960s. The concert was part of an eight-date tour called Good Evening Europe. The show was attended by industry professionals such as Ian Dempsey, Dave Fanning, Ryan Tubridy and Louis Walsh who flew in especially from the UK. Evening Herald reviewer Chris Wasser described the show as "an astonishing performance, and a late – but by all means, welcome – contender for gig of the year, if not the decade". Eamon Sweeney of the Irish Independent called it "one of the finest live performances of recent memory [...] It really doesn't get any better than this". Tony Clayton-Lea of The Irish Times said: "If there was one member of the audience who went home in a grumpy mood, then truly they were the Christmas Grinch".
- On 24 December, Bono, Glen Hansard, Mundy and Damien Rice participated in a busking session on Grafton Street, Dublin alongside volunteers who were raising money for the Simon Community.

== Bands disbanded ==
- Delorentos (announced on 17 February)
- The Dagger Lees (announced on 17 February)
- Giveamanakick (announced 17 August)
- Oppenheimer (announced on 12 December)

== Bands reformed ==
- 3/4 of The Cranberries
- Little Palace
- Delorentos (announced 22 April)
- Bob Geldof and The Boomtown Rats (temporary)
- The Lookalikes (temporary)
- All quarters of The Cranberries (announced 26 August)

== Albums & EPs ==
Below is a list of notable albums & EPs released by Irish artists in Ireland in 2009.

Issue date	Album title	Artist	Source	Sales	Notes
__ January	A Fire to Scare the Sun	Declan de Barra			His second album, featuring Cora Venus Lunny, the RTÉ Symphony Orchestra’s James Dunne, Kíla’s Brian Hogan and Mary Barneccutt from the Vyvienne Long Band.
26 January	Some Kind of Kick	The Things			Released on Nicotine Records.
5 February	Dolls and Jigsaws	Aoife Moriarty			
6 February	100 Midnights	The Mighty Stef			Released on Firstborn Recordings.
13 February	Everyday Demons	The Answer			Released by Albert Productions.
20 February	Blue Lights on the Runway	Bell X1			
20 February	Coffee Houses	Television Room			Released on Faction Records.
23 February	Untitled	Estel			
27 February	No Line on the Horizon	U2		484,000 copies in its first week	Artwork Debuted at the top of the US charts, the band's seventh number one album in that country. Debuted at #1 in the UK. #1 in thirty countries internationally.
6 March	Hands	Emmet Scanlon and What the Good Thought			
6 March	Aye Aye Aye Aye	The Kinetiks			Recorded with Gareth Mannix and featuring the lead track "Lightbulb" and bonus cuts of previous singles "Bite the Bullet" and "Shuffle Your Feet".
7 March	Beware of the God	Paranoid Visions			Eleven-track third album released three years after the band's official reformation, including the single "Missing in Action", which was one of the winners of the Hot Press/Tisch competition, the prize of which was a chance to have a professional quality music video made for them.
9 March	Let the Truth Be Told	Laura Izibor			Released on Atlantic Records.
20 March	And So I Watch You From Afar	And So I Watch You From Afar			Released on Smalltown America Records.
20 March	To The Pine Roots	Iain Archer			Full release to the nine-track album sold the previous year on the internet. Released on Black Records.
20 March	Trauma Themes Idiot Times	Jinx Lennon			
20 March	Crooked Timber	Therapy?			
27 March	The Nightsaver	David Kitt			Artwork and tracklisting. Kitt's sixth studio album.
__ April	TBA	The Brothers Movement			Debut album by the band formerly known as Mainline.
10 April	We Love You Dark Matter	Dark Room Notes			Released on Gonzo Records. Recorded over a fortnight in July 2008 in a London studio, it features reworked versions of old songs such as "Love Like Nicotine" and "Shake Shake My Ceiling", and lead single "Let's Light Fires". Artwork.
17 April	Human Nature	Alphastates			Second studio album. Due for a U.S. release in late 2009.
17 April	Listen	Christy Moore			First studio album since 2005's Burning Times.
17 April	Strawberry Blood	Mundy			Fourth studio album. Artwork
24 April	The Beautiful Untrue	Jerry Fish and the Mudbug Club			
8 May	I'll Wait for Sound	Director			Completed in LA in late 2008.
__ May	U2: Medium, Rare & Remastered	U2			2 CD package described as “a limited-edition collection of rare tracks and lost cuts spanning three decades in the studio”, containing songs such as "Love You Like Mad", "Smile", "Beautiful Ghost", "Xanax And Wine" and "Jesus Christ", previously only available as part of the digital The Complete U2 box set. Released on U2.com.
15 May	Transworld	Le Galaxie			Debut EP.
29 May	Pages	Julie Feeney			Artwork Launch details
29 May	Aliquot Strings	TUCAN			Debut album from the instrumental duo.
30 May	Fragile Things (EP)	The Ambiance Affair			
5 June	Grenade	The Chapman Society			Debut five-track EP.
5 June	Perfect Stranger	The Chapters			Debut studio album.
6 July	Jiggery Pokery	The Duckworth Lewis Method			Neil Hannon/Thomas Walsh collaboration set to be the first Irish concept album about cricket. To be released on 1969 Records. Artwork
24 July	New Boots	Wallis Bird			Released on Rubyworks Records.
2 August	No Baggage	Dolores O'Riordan			Second solo album, released on Cooking Vinyl.
28 August	The Victory Dance	David Geraghty			Second solo album.
Unknown	Democracy of One	Colin Devlin			
Autumn	TBA	The Aftermath			Worked on with Noel Hogan.
Autumn	TBA	D. C. Tempest			Debut album.
11 September	No Bird Sang	Ger Wolfe			Fifth album, produced by Peadar O'Riada, released on Raggedy Records, launched at Cork's Corner House Bar at 6 pm on Friday, September 11.
18 September	Trees Dream in Algebra	Codes			
18 September	Colours	Reemo			Debut album, launched in The Village on Wexford Street, Dublin, on 26 September.
18 September	After the Wedding	Sanskrit			Artwork. Featuring banjos, accordions, trumpets and samples of the Pope's voice.
25 September	Tony Was an Ex-Con	The Coronas			Revealed at Oxegen 2009.
28 September	Singled Out	Eleanor McEvoy			Compilation album of 15 singles from McEvoy's four albums and her new single "Oh Uganda".
__ September	Proceeds	Neosupervital			
__ September	TBA	Royseven			Completed in the band's own Dublin studio and released on Roadrunner Records.
9 October	You Can Make Sound	Delorentos			Artwork. Released on DeloRecords label through ADA Global distribution.
10 October	Analogue Droids (EP)	Cowboy X			Four-track EP, featuring the songs "Analogue Droids", "Squirrel Chase Ball", "Ed White's Glove" and "Villain In Disguise".
23 October	Strict Joy	The Swell Season			Featuring members of The Frames and recorded with producer Peter Katis in his Connecticut studio. US release due on 29 September 2009. General release date later pushed back from 25 September until 23 October 2009.
26 October	Yes Cadets (EP)	Yes Cadets			Follow-up to the quartet's debut single "Canada" which was released at the beginning of September 2009.
__ November	Live, Love, Lost It — NYC	Mark Geary			Live album recorded during the summer in New York City and released through Independent Records.
9 November	Up to Now	Snow Patrol			
13 November	Sidney Maxwell Williamson (EP)	Heritage Centre			
11 December	Little Revelations (rarities album); "Lucky Me", "My Villain Heart" and "Your Vandal" (box set of EPs)	Duke Special			
12 December	Ceol Cheann Dubhrann	Various			

- TBA – Sharon Corr (Spring 2009)
- TBA – The Dagger Lees (Summer 2009) ^{To be recorded early 2009 with Detroit producer Jim Diamond (The White Stripes, The Von Bondies and Electric Six).}
- TBA – Hooray For Humans (Spring 2009)
- TBA – The Minutes
- TBA – Vyvienne Long
- Blood Is Not Enough – Myp et Jeep
- TBA – Supermodel Twins (2009)
- Still Dangerous: Live at the Tower Theatre, Philadelphia – Thin Lizzy (2009)

== Singles ==
Below is a list of notable singles released by Irish artists in Ireland in 2009.

Issue date	Song title	Artist	Source	Sales	Notes
5 February 2009	"Alphabet Soup"	Aoife Moriarty			
6 February	"There's a Darkness"	The Aftermath			
6 February	"Under the Weather"	Emmet Scanlon and What the Good Thought			
15 February 2009	"Get on Your Boots"	U2			Date of official digital release, but released on iTunes on 19 January. Originally titled "Sexy Boots", it had reached #1 in Irish Airplay Charts within a week. The video given an online debut on the website of the Irish Independent. #1 in Ireland, #12 in the UK – first time in 12 years a U2 single was not in the UK Top 10.
30 January 2009	"The Great Defector"	Bell X1			Internationally released on 3 February 2009.
27 February 2009	"Postcards"	The Blizzards			
5 March 2009	"Sometimes"	Reemo			Produced by Marc Carolan and available on Reekus Records.
13 March	"Awful Cold"	Republic of Loose			
25 March	"Champagne Glass"	Alphastates			Mastered by Nilesh Patel, includes two Arveene & Misk remixes and taken from the trio's second studio album Human Nature
27 March	"Forgotten Man"	Peakin' Trippers			
23 April	"Bits & Bobs"	The Focus Group			
1 May	"Magnificent"	U2			Released in CD, 7" and download formats, b-sides include "Breathe" (live from Sommerville Theatre, Boston) on the 7" and a live cut of "Vertigo" and a Justice remix of first single "Get on Your Boots" on the CD release.
1 May	"Sing It Without a Tune"	Director			Taken from the album I'll Wait for Sound and released through the band's own Crapshoot Economics label
8 May	"I Will Protect You"	Heritage Centre			Taken from their debut EP The City, The Tree and The Fox released in February 2009.
22 May	"Love Is a Tricky Thing"	Julie Feeney			Lead single from the Pages LP.
22 May	"Trouble with a Capital T"	The Troublemakers			Downloadable charity cover single recorded at Windmill Lane Studios for The Raw Sessions. The track was released in aid of the Irish Youth Foundation, with a performance on The Late Late Show on the day of its release. The group includes members of The Blizzards, Republic of Loose, Brian Hogan, Kevin Godley and some former members of Horslips, who are the original performers of the song.
28 May	"I'm Every Woman"	Róisín Murphy/Sinéad O'Connor			Chaka Khan cover version released for ActionAid charity.
29 May	"Imagination"	D. C. Tempest			
12 June	"The Dry Law"	The Last Tycoons			
29 June	"The Age of Revolution"	The Duckworth Lewis Method			Digital release.
2 July	"To My Bones"	Wallis Bird			Video link
10 July	"This is Goodbye"	Codes			
10 July	"Dance with You"	Neosupervital			
__ August 2009	"Scream"	Jester			
__ August	"It's Not a Dream"	Sharon Corr			Featured on the BBC Radio 2 A-list in its first week of release above other Irish artists such as Dolores O'Riordan (C-List), Reamonn (C-List), The Duckworth Lewis Method (C-List) and U2 (B-List). Manager John Hughes said: "Normally you expect to debut on the C-list and maybe progress to the B-list—but going straight to the A-list with a debut release is really special. It is a statement of how highly they rate the record". The song later entered the UK Airplay Top 50, climbing from #315 to #41 in one week.
__ August/September 2009	"Oh Uganda/Hands Off Him"	Eleanor McEvoy			
__ September	"Listen Dear"	The Coronas			Video directed by Simon Eustace. Lead single from the album Tony Was an Ex-Con.
11 September	"A Song from Earth"	Ger Wolfe			Lead single from the album No Bird Sang.
18 September	"City Lights"	Sleep Thieves			The electronic trio's first proper single.
28 September	"Higher"	Jaded Sun			Taken from the album Gypsy Trip.
__ October	"Into the Trees"	Miracle Bell			Free download from band website.
__ October	"Rose"	Theme Tune Boy			49 second single available in several formats including download. Released by Niall Quinn, formerly of The Hitchers and Pennywhores, under the name Theme Tune Boy.
2 October	"Secret"	Delorentos			From the album You Can Make Sound.
9 October	"And Another Thing..."	The Blizzards			Inspired by Eoin Colfer's And Another Thing... novel from The Hitchhiker's Guide to the Galaxy series. Also released in the United Kingdom.
12 October	"True Love1980"	Ash			Part one of the A-Z Series of fortnightly releases.
19 October	"Howl On"	Bap Kennedy			Taken from the album Howl On.
24 October	"Closer" "Wake Up"	Ever27			Two singles released on the same day.
30 October	"Just Say Yes"	Snow Patrol			
__ November	"You Talked I Can Tell"	Alphastates			Third single taken from the band's second album Human Nature. Released on Magi records with their two previous singles, "Human Nature" and "Champagne Glass".
6 November	"Out of the Darkness"	Ham Sandwich			
19 November	"Vinegar Joe"	Sounds of System Breakdown			Available as a free download from the band's MySpace page.
23 November	"Comfort Zone"	The Answer			
__ December	"Wrong So Wrong"	Eleanor McEvoy			
2 December	"This Is to Mother You"	Sinéad O'Connor			Re-recorded version of her 1997 song released in aid of Girls Education & Mentoring Services (GEMS) as an anti-child prostitution single. Produced by Doc McKinney and Ali Shaheed Muhammad from A Tribe Called Quest, extra vocals provided by Mary J. Blige and Santigold.
11 December	"Sing to Me"	The Mighty Stef			
2009	"Raise the Dead"	Colin Devlin			
2009	"Let's Light Fires"	Dark Room Notes			
2009	"Shine"	Laura Izibor			
2009	"Big Bad Handsome Man"	Imelda May			
2009	"Time"	Michele Ann Kelly			Dedicated to marriage equality.

== Festivals ==
=== Oxegen 2009 ===
- Oxegen 2009 took place from 10 to 12 July. Tickets went on sale on 15 August 2008 and 6 March 2009. Snow Patrol, Blur, Kings of Leon and The Killers headlined a line-up which also featured Bloc Party, The Specials, Nine Inch Nails, Jane's Addiction, Pet Shop Boys, The Script, Katy Perry, Lily Allen, Elbow, Razorlight, Squeeze, Manic Street Preachers, Eagles of Death Metal, Nick Cave and the Bad Seeds, TV on the Radio, James, Keane, Doves, Pete Doherty, The Ting Tings, Lady Gaga, Pendulum, Glasvegas, Foals, Yeah Yeah Yeahs, White Lies, Fight Like Apes and God Is an Astronaut.

=== Electric Picnic 2009 ===
- Electric Picnic 2009 took place at Stradbally, County Laois from 4 – 6 September. On Friday 10 October 2008, a limited number of ‘Early Bird’ tickets went on sale at the 2008 price of €199, which included camping. Orbital, The Flaming Lips, Basement Jaxx, Madness, Klaxons, Bell X1, Fleet Foxes and MGMT were amongst the artists who performed.

=== Slane 2009 ===
- Lord Henry Mountcharles is understood to be in "serious negotiations" with potential acts for Slane in 2009. At the time the concert was due to take place AC/DC would have been in the middle of an 18-month world tour, their first in eight years, making the band one of the favourites to be the headline act. However, on October 14, 2008, the band confirmed a date at the O_{2}, Dublin which cast doubt on such a likelihood. Then, the following day, Oasis confirmed themselves as Slane 2009 headliners. Noel Gallagher and guitarist Gem Archer flew by helicopter into the County Meath venue for a photoshoot and press conference. The show will take place on Saturday June 20, 2009. Promoter MCD had planned to keep the announcement secret but news was leaked on online bulletin boards and blogs with media reports beginning to leak the evening before.

== Music awards ==
=== 2009 Meteor Awards ===
The 2009 Meteor Awards took place at the RDS in Dublin on 17 March 2009. Below are the winners:

Award	Winner(s)
Best Irish Male	Mick Flannery
Best Irish Female	Celine Hopkins
Best Irish Band	The Script
Best Irish Album	The Script – The Script
Best Irish Pop Act	Westlife
Best Irish Live Performance	The Blizzards – Oxegen
Best National DJ	Ray Foley – Today FM
Best Regional DJ	Dermot, Dave & Siobhan – Dublin's 98
Hope for 2009	Wallis Bird
Most Downloaded Irish Song	Galway Girl – Mundy and Sharon Shannon
Best International Male	James Morrison
Best International Female	Duffy
Best International Band	Elbow
Best International Album	Only by the Night – Kings of Leon
Best Live International Performance	
Industry Award	Niall Stokes
Humanitarian Award	Father Shay Cullen's PREDA Foundation
Lifetime Achievement Award	Sharon Shannon

=== Choice Music Prize ===
The Choice Music Prize for Irish Album of the Year 2008 was awarded to Jape for the album, Ritual, at Vicar Street on 4 March 2009.

== See also ==
- 2009 in Ireland
