= Arthur's Day =

Annual music events

- To Arthur!
- Dates: 24 September 2009; 23 September 2010; 22 September 2011; 27 September 2012; 26 September 2013
- Locations: Dublin, Ireland; Kuala Lumpur, Malaysia; Lagos, Nigeria; New York, United States; Yaoundé, Cameroon
- Years active: 5
- Website: http://www.guinness.com/en-ie/arthursday/

Arthur's Day was an annual series of music events worldwide, originally organised by Diageo in 2009 to promote the 250th anniversary of its Guinness brewing company. It was named after the founder of Guinness brewing, Arthur Guinness.

== Background ==
As early as the start of the 20th century, Irish satirist George A. Birmingham (the pseudonym of clergyman James Owen Hannay) (1865–1950) sarcastically advocated for a public holiday on J. Arthur Guinness's birthday in an effort to emphasise "the benefits of industry".

== History ==
The 2009 Arthur's Day events took place, internationally, in the cities of Dublin, Kuala Lumpur, Lagos, New York and Yaoundé on 24 September 2009. The event was broadcast internationally on Sky TV, ITV2 and DirecTV. €6 million was pledged to the Arthur Guinness Fund at the time. The festival was endorsed by several high-profile names, such as rock star-turned political activist Bob Geldof, director and screenwriter Guy Ritchie, footballer and Guinness football ambassador for Africa Michael Essien and British celebrities such as Peter Crouch and Sophie Dahl.

Notable high-profile names who later spoke out against Arthur's Day include: director Lenny Abrahamson, singer-songwriter Christy Moore, musician Mike Scott of The Waterboys, and actor Gabriel Byrne who criticised the marketing strategy employed by Guinness as "a cynical piece of exercise in a country which has a huge drinking problem". The event was also dubbed "Diageo Day" by The Huffington Post to promote a boycott of the event. The Royal College of Physicians Ireland highlighted a 30% increase in ambulance call-outs on each successive Arthur's Day and a doubling in alcohol-related liver disease over the previous decade, associated with drink promotion and the relative cheapness of alcohol.

Guinness drinkers were asked by the brewing company to raise a glass to the memory of Arthur Guinness at 17:59 (5:59 pm), a reference to 1759, the year the Guinness Brewery was established. An 82c stamp of an Arthur Guinness portrait was also released by An Post to commemorate the anniversary.

The last Arthur's Day was held in 2013 with Guinness cancelling the event in 2014. A new music programme to help emerging artists in Ireland called Guinness Amplify was launched to replace the event

== Marketing ==
The event was criticised as a marketing ploy to increase sales of Guinness with Arthur's day, without understanding or appreciation for the sense of nostalgia and meaning behind the "Black Stuff" that the event promoted according to Diageo. Diageo also claimed that Arthur's Day was held on a Thursday, rather than an accurate yearly basis on the original date. Thursday was chosen according to Diageo as Thursdays were the traditional "student night" in Dublin and many towns in Ireland.

The Irish Times has described Arthur's Day as "a masterclass in how to fabricate a national holiday" with its "à la carte attitude to traditional holidays" – noting its countdown to one minute before six (recalling New Year's Eve), "the faux-patriotism that comes with a celebration of a "national" drink" and the "hagiographic treatment" of Arthur Guinness as some kind of saint. The paper warned, "If St Patrick's Day, Christmas, and Hallowe'en are festivals that offer an excuse for a drink, Diageo has flipped the concept on its head and made the drink an excuse for a festival".

== By year ==
=== 2009 ===
Dublin

The Dublin shows occurred in four major venues (The Academy, Tripod, Vicar Street and Whelan's), 28 public houses and a specially established venue called Hop Store 13 at St. James's Gate Brewery. The events saw several high-profile acts performing in smaller locations than usual, with the likes of Tom Jones playing in a small Dublin pub. Admission prices referenced the well-known Guinness numbers, €9.99 and €17.59. The line-ups were confirmed on 24 July 2009. The events at Hop Store 13 would be hosted by Cat Deeley and Ronan Keating, whilst Colin Murray, Michelle Doherty and Michelle de Swarte would present from the other four major venues in the city.

The Academy	Tripod	Vicar Street	Whelan's
Richard Hawley; The Kooks; Imelda May; Paolo Nutini; Fionn Regan	Calvin Harris; Jamie Cullum; Mongrel featuring Rob Kelly and Rawsoul (rapper); Republic of Loose; Roots Manuva; Soul II Soul	Black Swan Effect; The Blizzards; The Magic Numbers; Ok Go; Razorlight; Reverend and The Makers; Sugababes	The Enemy; David Gray; Lisa Hannigan; The Hot Rats; Noah and the Whale; The Undertones; The Wombats

The Dublin events was headlined by Estelle, Tom Jones, Kasabian and Sugababes. Tom Jones was one of the acts to play Hop Store 13 before being taken to a secret location elsewhere in the city to perform again. Other acts include The Blizzards, The Chakras, The Chapters, Concerto For Constantine, The Coronas, Jamie Cullum, Dirty Epics, The Enemy, Mick Flannery, General Fiasco, David Gray, Calvin Harris, Richard Hawley, The High Kings, Hoarsebox, David Holmes, The Infomatics, Jerry Fish & The Mudbug Club, David Kitt, The Kooks, The Magic Numbers, Roots Manuva, Imelda May, Fiona Melady, Mystery Jets, Noah and the Whale, Noise Control, Paolo Nutini, OK Go, Oppenheimer, Razorlight, Fionn Regan, Republic of Loose, Reverend and The Makers, Sharon Shannon, Soul II Soul, The Undertones, White Belt Yellow Tag and The Wombats.

Belfast

Celebrations were led in Belfast by Paul and Michael at Cutter's, The Botanic Inn and The House.

Kuala Lumpur

The Black Eyed Peas headlined the Arthur's Day events in Sunway Lagoon in Kuala Lumpur. The Malaysian government had initially forbidden Muslims to attend as it contradicts sharia law due to the organiser promoting alcohol, a beverage which Muslims are not allowed to drink. Non-Muslims in Malaysia were allowed to attend if they wish. Contrary to previous regulations, anyone above the age of 18 years can now participate.

Galway

In 2010, an outdoor Arthur's Day gig took place at Folan Quay, Galway Harbour. Acts that performed on the day included Imelda May, Newton Faulkner, Empire Saints, Sharon Shannon, The Magic Numbers, David Gray.

Lagos

Sean Paul headlined the Arthur's Day events in Lagos.

=== 2010 ===
On 3 June 2010, Arthur's Day 2010 was confirmed and the following acts were announced: Snow Patrol, Paolo Nutini, José González, Royseven, The View, We Have Band, MILK, Broken Records, Mick Flannery, The Rags, John Spillane, Jay Sean, The Hoosiers, Slow Club, The Maccabees, The Magic Numbers, Sharon Shannon, The High Kings, The Chapters, The Dirty 9s, Heathers and Dirty Epics. Applications from musical acts were requested. For 2010, events occurred in Cork, Dublin and Galway on 23 September. On 28 July it was confirmed via The Victims Official website that Brandon Flowers would also be playing in support of his solo album, Flamingo.

St. James's Gate	Vicar Street	Olympia Theatre	The Academy	The Village
Snow Patrol; Westlife; Manic Street Preachers; Biffy Clyro; Maud in Cahoots	The Courteeners; The Script; The Maccabees; The Hoosiers; Eliza Doolittle	Cathy Davey; Carbon/Silicon; Paolo Nutini; The Chapters	Brandon Flowers; Plan B; Tim Robbins & The Rogues Gallery Band; José González; Slow Club	Kelis; Tinie Tempah; Ty; Example; We Have Band

- The Savoy – Cork: Paolo Nutini, Sharon Corr, The View, Fortune, O Emperor, Reko.
- Folan Quay – Galway: David Gray, Imelda May, Newton Faulkner, The Magic Numbers, Sharon Shannon, Empire Saints.

Kuala Lumpur

The Guinness Arthur's Day 2010 was held on 24 September 2010 (GMT/UTC +8) at Surf Beach @ Sunway Lagoon and featured performances by Flo Rida, Sean Kingston, Colby O'Donis, Mizz Nina, Pop Shuvit, Thaitanium, Melissa Indot and DJ Fuzz.

Indonesia

Arthur's Day in Indonesia was celebrated for the first time on 4 December 2010 at the Oval Plaza Epicentrum Walk, Jakarta. Lifehouse, the American alternative rock band which came to prominence in 2001 with their hit single 'Hanging by a moment', performed in front of more than 4,000 fans. They were supported on the day by Rivermaya, a popular band from the Philippines and two hit Indonesian bands; Superman Is Dead and Pure Saturday. Winners of the Guinness Bold Chemistry took center stage along with these international talents.

The large-scale music concert also featured several attractions, including a Guinness timeline, photo booths and a Guinness Ice Bar. Another feature of the event was Wooz.in, which allowed fans to check in at the venue on Foursquare and upload photos to Facebook or Twitter using an RFID-enabled wristband. The event brought fans together to celebrate the occasion and raise a toast to Arthur.

=== 2011 ===
St. James's Gate	Olympia Theatre	Vicar Street	The Academy	Ulster Hall	Big Top, Limerick	The Savoy, Cork
Stereophonics; Paolo Nutini; Yasmin; The Saturdays; Leaders of Men	Scissor Sisters; Aloe Blacc; Ed Sheeran; Wolf Gang; Florrie	The Charlatans; Bell X1; Labrinth; James Walsh; Sunday Girl; Maverick Sabre	Paloma Faith; Big Talk; Bitches With Wolves; Joshua Radin; Miles Kane; Ryan Sheridan	The Enemy; Horslips; Kelis; Ash; DJ Fresh; Cashier No.9	Calvin Harris; The Feeling; Fight Like Apes; Sharon Shannon; Jamie Woon; Royseven	Seasick Steve; Neil Hannon; Wretch 32; Bressie; Carl Barât

- Baggot Inn, Dublin: Yngve & The Innocent, Bitches with Wolves
- Palace Bar, Dublin: Yngve & The Innocent, Fox Avenue
- Flannery's Pub, Dublin: Fox Avenue, Carley Connor

Kuala Lumpur

The Arthur's Day celebrations in Kuala Lumpur, Malaysia kicked off on 23 September 2011 (GMT/UTC +8). The event held at Speed City @ Selangor Turf Club was attended by an estimated crowd of 10,000 and featured performances by Taio Cruz, Mizz Nina, Soler, Dragon Red, Prema Yin, Joe Flizzow, Take-T (Japan) and Dandee (Thailand).

Indonesia

Like the global celebration, Guinness Indonesia has also expanded its festivities into a larger audience to grow the footprint of Arthur's Day by bringing even more unforgettable experience through a remarkable concert in 4 cities across Indonesia in Jakarta, Medan, Surabaya and Makassar.

Internationally renowned artist The Script performed at the Pullman Hotel Ballroom in Jakarta on 12 November in front of more than 5000 fans who joined to toast the great Arthur Guinness. They were supported on the night by local bands Gugun Blues Shelter and Mike's X GroovyL@nd. On 12 November, Guinness Arthur's Day in Jakarta was positioned as the 2nd most trending topic in Twitter media worldwide.

The Guinness Arthur's Day Indonesia road show continued; with the American Rock group Mr. Big performing in Medan, Surabaya and Makassar. Mr. Big hit Medan on 3 December at Pardede Hall with collaboration from Indonesian rock band /rif, and performed in front of 4000 people who joined the celebration. Next up for Mr. Big was a performance in Surabaya on 7 December at Grand City where the concert was opened by local superstar Netral. Finally, Mr. Big visited Makassar on 10 December and performed the final Arthur's Day 2011 celebrations at Trans Studio. As was fitting for the final celebration of the year, Makassar had the largest attendance with a crowd of over 9000 people. Across the four cities, the Guinness Arthur's Day Indonesia celebration was experienced by over 22,000 people at the four venues. An additional element was that Guinness provided live streaming in 34 outlets all over Indonesia during the concerts.

=== 2012 ===
The 2012 promotion of Arthur's day on 27 September included television and billboard advertising under the slogan "Paint the town black".

Example, Tinie Tempah, Ellie Goulding, Mika, Professor Green, Fatboy Slim, Texas and Amy Macdonald have been confirmed as headline acts for Arthur's Day 2012. Also on the bill were Picturehouse, Mundy, Walking on Cars, Dove, The Vals, The Rapparee, The Bonnevilles, Lilygreen & Maguire, The Heads of State, Ard Rí, Midnight Graffiti, Fiddler's Green, Ruaile Buaile, Willie Byrne, Gentry Morris, Shane Butler, Jaker and Brush Shiels. Arthur's Day 2012 took place on 27 September.

=== 2013 ===
Arthur's Day 2013 was celebrated on Thursday 26 September 2013. On 12 August 2013, the line-up for the 2013 Arthur's day was announced, with The Script, Emeli Sande, Bobby Womack and Manic Street Preachers, among others, headlining the acts that will be playing. The slogan used on advertisements for 2013 was "Showcasing Ireland's Talent & Creativity", which highlighted the 500+ musical events taking place on the day.

Kuala Lumpur, Malaysia will be celebrating Arthur's Day 2013 on 27 September 2013 with Five For Fighting, The All American Rejects & The Wanted at Sepang International Center.

In September 2013, a Social Media campaign entitled 'Boycott Arthur's Day' began claiming national and international attention. Irish & International Artists and Musicians have given their support to the campaign which calls on Irish Citizens to 'Say NO to Diageo's boozefest. On 24 September, a live studio debate which included Guinness executive Peter O'Brien was held on Prime Time on RTÉ One discussing the pros and cons of Arthur's day. Singer Christy Moore released a single to mark the occasion which he performed on Prime Time. There has been significant criticism of the event this year due to a 30% increase in ambulance callouts in Dublin on the night in 2012. People have criticised Diageo for inventing a "pseudo-national holiday" to market its products.

== Legacy ==
Since its cancellation, there have been several reported celebrations of Arthur's Day. In September 2015, the DailyEdge.ie reported that a bar in Jundaí, Brazil was hosting an event for Arthur's Day despite it being abandoned. The same website reported, also in September 2015, that a pub in Ballaghaderreen, County Roscommon in Ireland was celebrating "The Day Formerly Known As Arthur's Day".
