= The Dirty 9s =

Irish band

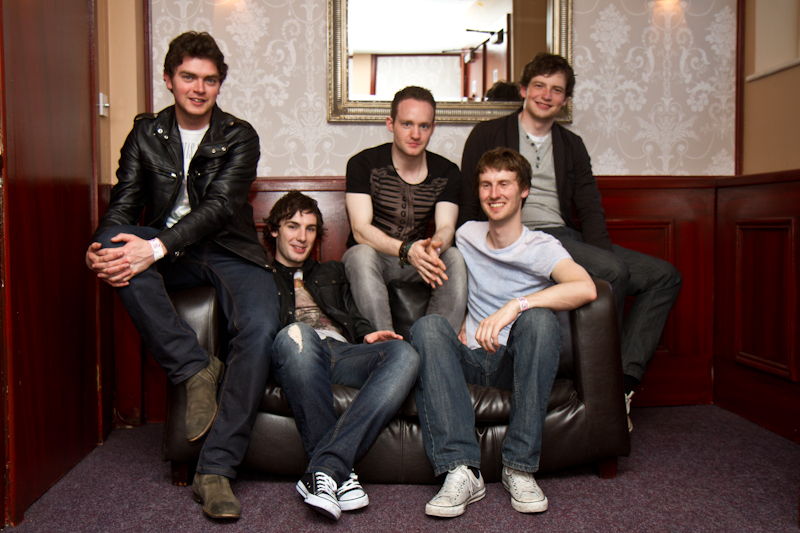
- The Dirty 9s back stage before the Phantom First Friday gig

Background information
- Origin: Dublin, Ireland
- Genres: Indie rock pop rock
- Years active: 2008–present
- Label: Sci-Fi Girl Records
- Members: Fergal Moloney; Cian McCarthy; Keith Brett; Paul Rice
- Past members: Stephen Dunne
- Website: www.thedirty9s.net

The Dirty 9s are a band from Dublin, Ireland, who have been writing and recording music together since 2008.

The band released their debut album, Stop Screaming Start Dreaming in 2010 which features the highly rated single, "Lucy Opus" which State.ie described as "..the best song the band have composed to date, 'Lucy Opus' is an impressive snapshot of the Dirty 9s potential and the direction they hopefully continue moving in..."

While the majority of the band's music is in English, they do occasionally perform in Irish. In 2010, they recorded and released their song "Trouble" in Irish. In 2012, the band were asked to translate their single "Hey!" into Irish for Albam RíRá, a special compilation with well-known bands singing their songs in Irish. The album also featured tracks from Delorentos and The Coronas and was released in March 2012 during Seachtain na Gaeilge.

The band's second album, produced with record producer Karl Odlum, released in early 2013.

== Members ==
=== Current ===
- Fergal Moloney
- Cian McCarthy
- Paul Rice
- Keith Brett

=== Previous ===
- Stephen Dunne (2008–2011)

== History ==
=== Formation ===
The band formed in 2008. Fergal Moloney, Keith Brett, Cian McCarthy, and Stephen Dunne had known each other while attending school in Blanchardstown, McCarthy met Paul Rice while the two were working for Buy & Sell magazine. All members immediately clicked musically despite having very different influences which include the likes of Blur, Otis Redding, The Beatles, Echo & the Bunnymen, Foo Fighters, At the Drive-In, Oasis, Jeff Buckley, Ryan Adams, Radiohead and Death Cab for Cutie. The band first came to the public's attention when they came first on Irish television Show, Deis Roc and with that received €10,000 in prize money. The show which aired on TG4 was a music competition for unsigned bands in which band had to write and perform their own music in Irish. Judges on the programme included Jim Lockhart from the Irish band, "Horslips".

The band used the prize money received from the competition to make their debut album, Stop Screaming Start Dreaming.

=== Stop Screaming Start Dreaming ===
The Dirty 9s commissioned experienced record producer Greg Haver to produce their debut album. Producer, Greg Haver has worked with bands and musicians such as Super Furry Animals, Manic Street Preachers, Catatonia and Lost Prophets. The album was recorded in two weeks at the Nutshed Studio in Clara, County Offaly in late September 2008.

Stop Screaming Start Dreaming was released on 12 March 2010.

== "Hey!" : music video and single ==
A live favourite for a number of years, "Hey" was finally recorded by the band in the summer of 2011 in Windmill Lane with engineer Alan Kelly. The track was mixed by Karl Odlum and released as a single on 16 March. The song received extensive radio play on Radio Nova 100, SPIN 1038 and iRadio. Director Cathal O Cuaig made a music video for the song which was filmed in Barcelona and Dublin.

Raidió RíRá asked the band to translate the song into Irish for Albam RíRá, a special compilation with well-known bands singing they're songs in Irish. The album also featured tracks from Delorentos and The Coronas and was released in March 2012 during Seachtain na Gaeilge. Students from Colaiste na bhFiann Irish College selected the song as one of the tracks that students would learn and perform while attending the Summer 2012 courses.

== Second album ==
Most of 2011 and early 2012 was spent writing and rehearsing in Camelot Studios in West Dublin as the band prepared for their second album.

They began recording of their as yet untitled second album in July 2012 in Sun Studios in Dublin. The album is being produced by Karl Odlum (Gemma Hayes/Ham Sandwich/David Kitt) and is expected to be released in early 2013.

== Music career ==
In 2008, the Dirty 9s song Corridors was included on the Oxjam CD, the album was made available for free with Hot Press magazine.

In 2009, the band were selected by the Tisch School of Arts to have a music video made for their debut single Lucy Opus. The video was directed by PJ Yurcak.

In 2010, The Dirty 9s recorded a World cup song supporting Argentina called, "The Ballad of El Diego". The song featured an operatic vocal performance by David Scott. The song was released by Indiecator records as part of their World cup album. The Guardian described the song as a "ludicrously catchy, horn-soaked Argentine anthem.."

The Dirty 9s have appeared the Electric Picnic music festival in 2010 and 2011 playing the Puball Gaeilge Tent in the Mindfield Rocks section.

The band played Arthur's Day in Dublin in 2010.

In 2011, the Dirty 9s were invited to play at Canadian Music Week in Toronto. The band played their showcase gig at the legendary Horseshoe Tavern and were featured on respected DJ Alan Cross's Explore Music blog.

For St. Patricks Day 2012, the band performed an outdoor concert in Dame Court in Dublin.

Music producer Dave "Skip" Christophers invited the band to record two tracks for the Hotpress sponsored compilation Genre Free. The band contributed two new songs "Next to You" and "Stranded" to the album. The Genre Free album was launched in the Button Factory in Dublin on 17 May 2012.

The band performed at Indiependence 2012 in Michelstown, County Cork.

Recently the band have been working closely with new a startup called 'Homebeat' which saw them play in unusual venues such as apartments, bookshops and organic tea shops around Dublin. The band performed at a special Homebeat concert for the 10 Days of Dublin festival.

== Film and television ==
Music from the band's first album was used throughout the fourth series of the RTÉ show, Raw.

The Dirty 9s provided the soundtrack for the short-film An Cluiche directed by Cathal O Cuaig. The film premiered at the Dingle Film Festival in 2012 and was also featured at the Galway Film Fleadh; the screening of the film was attended by Fionnula Flanagan.

== In media ==
In 2008, the band were invited to record a live TV session for BBC Alba by broadcaster Niall Iain MacDonald the session aired in 2009 on the music show Rapal.

The band have made numerous appearances on Irish television. In 2010, while promoting their debut album "Stop Screaming, Start Dreaming" the band appeared on the 11th Hour with Dave Fanning on RTÉ Two while they also recorded live sessions for Ceol ar an Imeall on TG4 and Imeall Geal on BBC Northern Ireland.

They appeared on the cover of Nós Mag in the May 2012 edition.

It has been confirmed that the band will perform on the new BBC Northern Ireland series "Cuisle" in 2013. The series is being filmed in Cultúrlann McAdam Ó Fiaich on the Falls Road in Belfast.

== Name ==
The band were named after the nickname given to their local bus service, the 39.

== Discography ==
The Dirty 9s discography
- Studio albums: 1
- Singles: 4

=== Studio albums ===
Year	Album details	Peak chart positions	
Year	Album details	IRL	UK
2010	Stop Screaming Start Dreaming: Released: 12 March 2010; Label: Self Released; Formats: CD, Download	—	—
"—" denotes a title that did not chart.

=== Singles ===
Year	Title	Peak chart positions		Album
Year	Title	IRL	UK	Album
2009	"Lucy Opus"	—	—	Stop Screaming Start Dreaming
2010	"Corridors"	—	—	Stop Screaming Start Dreaming
2010	"Trouble"	—	—	Stop Screaming Start Dreaming
2012	"Hey"	—	—	non-album singles
"—" denotes a title that did not chart.
