= The Raw Sessions =

Irish interactive music television programme

- Also known as: The Raw Sessions with Sony Ericsson
- Genre: Music/reality television
- Developed by: Lotus Media
- Starring: Dirty Epics; Hoarsebox; The Infomatics; Majella Murphy; Noise Control; R.S.A.G. Sickboy; Sweet Jane
- Country of origin: Ireland
- Original language: English
- No. of series: 1
- No. of episodes: 8

Original release
- Network: RTÉ Two
- Release: 12 May – 4 July 2009

The Raw Sessions (also known as The Raw Sessions with Sony Ericsson) is an Irish interactive music television programme broadcast on RTÉ Two in 2009. The country's first ever rockumentary series, it was presented by Dez Ryan and followed the attempts of eight musical acts to write and record an original composition in the space of twelve hours. It was produced by Lotus Media.

The Raw Sessions commenced broadcast on 12 May 2009. Episodes were broadcast late on Tuesday nights and repeated late on Saturday nights.

Each week the two recorded tracks were made available for download, with downloads counting towards the Irish Singles Chart. Tracks were recorded in destinations such as Sun Studios in Temple Bar, Dublin; Windmill Lane Studios on Ringsend Road, Dublin; and Grouse Lodge in County Westmeath. There was also a celebrity episode which featured more established musicians recording a cover version for charity.

Eight acts took part in the show. These were Dirty Epics, Hoarsebox, The Infomatics, Majella Murphy, Noise Control, R.S.A.G., Sickboy and Sweet Jane. The four acts which made it to the semi-finals recorded a track at Grouse Lodge. The top three from that vote progressed to the final at the Button Factory in Dublin.

The winning artist was awarded the title Sony Ericsson Artist of the Year.

== Format ==
Two acts per episode were given one day each to write and record an original musical piece. A public vote was used to decide who progressed to the semi-final. Four acts competed in the semi-final and performed at a live show in the Button Factory venue. The three acts with the most votes featured in the final broadcast and the one with the most won the title of Sony Ericsson Artist of the Year.

== Episodes ==
=== Heats ===
The first episode was broadcast on 12 May 2009 and featured Sweet Jane and R.S.A.G. who recorded the tracks "Black Eyes" and "All Along That Road" respectively at Sun Studios. Commentary was provided by Sunday Tribune journalist Una Mullally, Phantom FM presenter Sinister Pete and Hot Press editor Niall Stokes. R.S.A.G. won the first heat and a prize of recording an original track at Grouse Lodge.

The second episode was broadcast on 19 May 2009 and featured Dirty Epics and Sickboy. Dirty Epics won with their track "All Time Favourite" which beat Sickboy's "Yellow Moon".

The third episode was broadcast on 26 May 2009 and featured The Infomatics and Noise Control. The Infomatics progressed to the semi-final at Grouse Lodge.

The fourth episode was broadcast on 2 June 2009 and featured Hoarsebox and Majella Murphy. Majella Murphy progressed to the semi-final at Grouse Lodge.

=== Celebrity episode ===
A celebrity episode which aired as the fifth episode of The Raw Sessions on 9 June 2009 saw several more established musicians record a cover version of "Trouble with a Capital T" by Horslips at Windmill Lane Studios. The song was released on 22 May 2009 in aid of the Irish Youth Foundation and was performed on The Late Late Show later that day. Calling themselves The Troublemakers, they featured Kevin Godley, Brian Hogan and members of bands such as 10cc, Horslips, The Blizzards and Republic of Loose. The track was produced by Lance Hogan of Kíla.

=== Semi-final ===
The sixth episode was broadcast on 16 June 2009 and featured Dirty Epics and R.S.A.G. They recorded "White Out" and "Movement" respectively with producers Leo Pearson and Ken McHugh at Grouse Lodge. They had eighteen hours to record an original song.

The seventh episode was broadcast on 23 June 2009 and featured The Infomatics and Majella Murphy. They recorded "Let Me Fly" and "From the Sun" respectively with producers Lance Hogan and Michael Keeney and producer duo Arveene and Misk at Grouse Lodge.

The three acts with the most votes (and downloads) progressed to the final.

=== Final ===
The final was recorded live at the Button Factory on 26 June 2009, with tickets made available the week before. It was broadcast on 30 June 2009. It featured performances from the top three artists: Dirty Epics, The Infomatics and R.S.A.G. The winner was announced on 4 July 2009, with the voting lines having shut at midnight the previous night. The winner was The Infomatics. They were awarded the title Sony Ericsson Artist of the Year and received a prize of one week of recording at Grouse Lodge, a package from Sony Ericsson and a feature on a flip-cover of 16 July 2009 issue of Hot Press.

== Reception ==
State said beforehand that "the launch of any new music series on Irish television is something to be applauded" and the show seemed "particularly interesting".

Jim Carroll of The Irish Times praised the idea behind the show but was critical of its execution which he called a "hames" and the interactive part of the show which he said would induce a "collective groan around the nation". He was dissatisfied at the length of time—half the show—it took to introduce the bands and criticised the amount of time spent on "capturing the "personality" of the acts". Carroll was also critical of Ryan for his lack of presentational clue and his ignorance of the acts involved. Furthermore, he disagreed with the concept of RTÉ owning the rights to all the recorded tracks for one year.

Competing artist R.S.A.G. said The Raw Sessions was "a great thing".
