= The Infomatics =

- Origin: Dublin, Ireland
- Genres: Electronica, hip hop, jazz, reggae
- Label: Unsigned
- Members: Bugs; BOC; Konchus Lingo; Mr. Dero

The Infomatics is an Irish hip hop musical ensemble from Dublin. They consist of Bugs, BOC, Steo (aka Konchus Lingo), and Mr. Dero. Steo's brother, Damien Gunn, was lead vocalist and saxman with Tokyo Olympics and previously DC Nien, a 1970s band who once feuded with U2.

The Infomatics has released one album titled Kill or Create. They participated in the interactive music television series The Raw Sessions in 2009, winning the overall series. Since winning, they have been dubbed "the loudest voice in Irish hip hop". They have been awarded the title Sony Ericsson Artist of the Year.

== Style ==
The Infomatics perform with a jazz flute, guitar, bass, keyboard, drums, and two MCs. They use organic instruments and loops, and their lyrics aim to describe their experience of Dublin life.

== Career ==
The Infomatics performed their debut live show in the Red Box (since renamed the Pod).

In 2008 The Infomatics released their debut album titled Kill or Create . It featured a variety of genres such as reggae, jazz and electronica.

In 2009 they created two original songs as part of The Raw Sessions with Sony Ericsson eight-part television series, for which they received The Raw Sessions Sony Ericsson Artist of the Year award.

They have also performed live with other notable hip-hop artists, including Nas, Soul II Soul, Ice-T, The Cool Kids, De La Soul, EDAN, Lupe Fiasco, and Immortal Technique.

=== The Raw Sessions ===
The Infomatics participated in the music programme The Raw Sessions which was broadcast on RTÉ Two in 2009. They debuted in the third episode broadcast on 26 May 2009 and received a higher proportion of public votes than Noise Control to reach the semi-final to record a track at Grouse Lodge. Their recording at Grouse Lodge was featured in the seventh episode of the programme which was broadcast on 23 June 2009. The Infomatics recorded "Let Me Fly", whilst Murphy recorded "From the Sun" with producers Lance Hogan and Michael Keeney and producer duo Arveene and Misk at Grouse Lodge.

The Infomatics then participated in the live final at the Button Factory music venue alongside fellow finalists Dirty Epics and R.S.A.G. and won the series and the title Sony Ericsson Artist of the Year. They also received a prize of one week of recording at Grouse Lodge, a package from Sony Ericsson and a feature on a flip-cover of 16 July 2009 issue of Hot Press.

=== Arthur's Day ===
The Infomatics performed at the Arthur's Day international events in Dublin on 24 September 2009.

== Awards ==
| Year | Nominee / work | Award | Result |
|---|---|---|---|
| 2009 | The Infomatics | Sony Ericsson Artist of the Year | Won |
