= IMRO Live Music Venue of the Year Awards =

Irish award

- Awarded for: Best venues from the Republic of Ireland
- Presented by: Irish Music Rights Organisation (IMRO)
- First award: 2008

The IMRO Live Music Venue of the Year Awards are annual awards which are presented by the Irish Music Rights Organisation (IMRO) in conjunction with Hot Press and MUZU TV. The awards were first given in 2008.

== Format ==
IMRO's members select their three favourite music venues in Ireland. 400 venues are said to be eligible for the awards and included are theatres and public houses. The winning venues are then shortlisted for the IMRO Live Music Venue of the Year Awards. The Hot Press Readers Award for Best Live Music Venue is voted on by the public on the magazine's website. Several factors determine the winners: these include "ambience, staging, sound and lighting, programming, staff and promotion".:

== History ==
=== 2008 ===
The winning venues were announced during The Music Show at the RDS in Dublin.

==== Shortlist ====
The nominations by region with the winners in bold:

| Dublin | Rest of Leinster | Munster | Connacht | Ulster (Donegal, Cavan and Monaghan) |
|---|---|---|---|---|
| Olympia Theatre; Tripod; **Vicar Street**; Whelan's; The Button Factory | The Stables, Mullingar; Birr Theatre and Arts Centre; **Spirit Store, Dundalk**; McHugh's of Drogheda; The Mermaid Theatre, Bray | INEC, Killarney; The Forum, Waterford; **Cyprus Avenue, Cork**; Cork Opera House; Glór Theatre, Ennis | The Hawk's Well Theatre, Sligo; McGarrigle's, Sligo; **Róisín Dubh, Galway**; The Dock, Carrick-on-Shannon; The Station House Theatre, Galway | The Iontas Theatre, Castleblayney; An Grianán Theatre, Letterkenny; **Chasin' Bull, Bundoran**; McGrory's, Culdaff; The Brewery (McKenna's), Monaghan |

Hot Press awards went to Cyprus Avenue, Cork, The Stables, Mullingar and Vicar Street, Dublin. Vicar Street received an award for Overall National Winner.

=== 2009 ===
The 2009 IMRO Live Music Venue of the Year Awards were launched by Danny O'Reilly of The Coronas and Julie Feeney on 21 October. The awards ceremony occurred on 1 December, at IMRO HQ in Dublin.

==== Shortlist ====
The nominations by region with the winners in bold:

| Dublin | Rest of Leinster | Munster | Connacht | Ulster (Donegal, Cavan and Monaghan) |
|---|---|---|---|---|
| Crawdaddy; Olympia Theatre; The O2; **Vicar Street**; Whelan's | The Backroom, Navan; The Late Lounge, Kill; **Set Theatre, Kilkenny**; Spirit Store, Dundalk; The Watergate Theatre, Kilkenny | Cyprus Avenue, Cork; **Dolan's Warehouse, Limerick**; The Everyman Theatre, Cork; INEC, Killarney; The Pavilion, Cork | Campbell's Tavern, Headford; Crane Bar, Galway; **Róisín Dubh, Galway**; Royal Theatre & Event Centre, Castlebar; Town Hall Theatre, Galway | Balor Arts Centre; An Grianan, Letterkenny; Iontas, Castleblayney; **McGrory's, Culdaff**; Ramor Theatre, Cavan |

The Hot Press award went to Cyprus Avenue in Cork.

=== 2010 ===
The 2010 IMRO Live Music Venue of the Year Awards were launched on 3 October.
