= The Ramisco Maki Maki Rocking Horse =

- Also known as: Ramisco, The Horse
- Born: Ray McCartney; Paisley, Scotland
- Origin: Strathcarron, Scotland
- Genres: Indie folk, Americana, indie rock, alternative country
- Instruments: Singing, guitar, Banjo, Ukulele, Pedal steel guitar, Synthesizer, Banjolele
- Label: Planet Groucho Records
- Website: www.ramiscomakimaki.com

The Ramisco Maki Maki Rocking Horse is an indie folk artist from the Scottish Highlands (born Ray McCartney on 1 February 1981 in Paisley, Scotland).

== History ==
Ray McCartney started writing music under the moniker, The Ramisco Maki Maki Rocking Horse, towards the end of 2009 while recovering from brain surgery. He had previously performed as Little Beard in The Kazoo Funk Orchestra from 2005–2008 and as Sir Fred in El Jugador from 2002–2005.

The Ramisco Maki Maki Rocking Horse cites his influences as the Violent Femmes, Beck, Hank Williams and O'Death.

While mostly a solo artist, The Ramisco Maki Maki Rocking Horse occasionally performs with a backing band. Caliente Mellonhawk (Cailean Macleod) plays drums and Keef (Keith Pearce) plays bass.

=== One Zero One Zero One Zero ===
Ramisco released his debut album, One Zero One Zero One Zero, on 10 October 2010. The ten track album was recorded in Ayrshire, Scotland. Papel Y Creyonnes, which was written in Spanish, was included on episode 223 of the Three From Leith podcast. About a month after the release of One Zero One Zero One Zero, Ramisco was interviewed for the Kowalskiy Scottish Music Blog.

=== Fajita's Basement ===
On 28 March 2011, Ramisco released, Fajita's Basement, a four track EP recorded in Mississauga, Canada. The Waiting Room Radio Show broadcast the opening track "Blame You, Blame You" on Houndstooth Radio, Radio Phoenix, Xpress Radio and ErrorFM. Fajita's Basement received a review on the Kowalskiy Scottish Music Blog. Last Years Girl blog included "Won't You Sleep" in a mix and provided a short review.

=== Mr Asterisk + Fajita's Basement ===
Ramisco also released a compilation on CD and cassette tape entitled, Mr Asterisk + Fajita's Basement. The compilation featured "Never Stop", "The Shrinkin' Railroad Shtomp", "Eatin' On My Memories" and "My 'Orns" from One Zero One Zero One Zero in addition to the four tracks from Fajita's Basement. This was Ramisco's first release on CD and/or cassette tape, as earlier releases were only available as digital downloads. The Curious Joe blog posted a review of the compilation.

=== The Acoustoblaster Tour ===
On 2 April 2011 Ramisco went on a one-day tour of Glasgow, Scotland with fellow artist Tragic O'Hara. The tour moved across the city as the day progressed with short sets performed at nine venues including King Tut's Wah Wah Hut. Each performance was recorded onto cassette tape and handed to a member of the audience at the end of the show. The tour also included a live flip chart art show by Harvey GreenDog.

=== The Roadside Attraction Tour ===
The Roadside Attraction Tour took place in August 2011. The tour included stops at various roadside attractions in Ohio, Tennessee, Kentucky, West Virginia and Pennsylvania. Most notably, a giant rocking chair in Austinburg, Ohio, a field of giant corn cobs in Dublin, Ohio and Abraham Lincoln Birthplace National Historical Park in Hodgenville, Kentucky. Ramisco performed a short set at each stop.

=== BBC Session ===
On 10 November 2012, Ramisco recorded a session for BBC Television with his backing band The Wat Wat Kings at BBC Scotland in Glasgow, Scotland. The session featured three tracks and is due to air as part of series 6 of Rapal on BBC Alba. The Ramisco Maki Maki Rocking Horse and The Wat Wat Kings performed "Seas Air Do Chorra-bhiod" on episode 3 which aired on 7 March 2013. "Danger Danger" and "Blame You Blame You" on episode 10 which aired on 25 April 2013.

=== Squawk! ===
The Ramisco Maki Maki Rocking Horse released Squawk! on 4 March 2013. The EP features eight tracks including "Danger Danger", which made its radio debut on BBC Radio Nan Gaidheal during the Rapal show on 31 January 2013. Squawk! also features "Seas Air Do Chorra-bhiod" which is Ramisco's first and only Gaelic track to date. "Seas Air Do Chorra-bhiod" was named Gaelic Song of the Year 2012 by BBC Alba's Rapal.

"Danger Danger" was picked as a Fresh Fav on Tom Robinson’s website Fresh On The Net (1 April 2013) and was play-listed on the BBC Introducing Mixtape on BBC Radio 6 Music; "The Shrinkin' Railroad Shtomp" was played by Baylen Leonard on his show, The Front Porch (9 November 2013); Following that, Ramisco performed an acoustic version of "Under the Sky" for Traxx Radio's Top 50 of 2013 (2 February 2014). Tom Robinson later play-listed "Under the Sky" on the BBC Introducing Mixtape (15 September 2014), played it on The Tom Robinson Show (20 September 2014) and featured it in the BBC Introducing Best of 2014 Mixtape (28 December 2014).

=== Living Indie TV ===
Ramisco was shortlisted and performed at The 100 Club in London as part of the Living Indie TV Road to Santa Maria final, the show was broadcast live on Living Indie TV and archived on their website.

=== Hoofography ===
On 30 September 2015, Radio Kaos Caribou broadcast an exclusive 2-hour audio biography of The Ramisco Maki Maki Rocking Horse, which was otherwise known as the Hoofography. The Hoofography featured the majority of songs recorded by Ramisco as well as tracks by The Kazoo Funk Orchestra, El Jugador, Weapon Of Choice, Lindsay Llewellyn and Oak Hero, all of which have been associated with Ramisco at some point in time. During the show, Ramisco also spoke of his brain surgery, his time with The Kazoo Funk Orchestra and his more recent production work for Lindsay Llewellyn and Oak Hero. The broadcast was accompanied by an interview facilitated by the independent music blog, Ralph's Life. The interview received over 3000 hits during the initial broadcast of the Hoofography, which sent it straight to No. 1 in Ralph's Top Ten Blogged Band Chart.

=== Possessed by the Gods of Cowbell Oblongata ===
Possessed by the Gods of Cowbell Oblongata is a 4-track EP, recorded by Ramisco between 29 July and 5 August 2015. On 23 August 2015, the lead track, "And We Will Dance", was debuted on Jim Gellatly’s Amazing Radio show and was played again on 6 September 2015. "And We Will Dance" was also featured on Radio Kaos Caribou; playlisted for The First 45 on Sine FM; playlisted on The Roddy Hart Show on BBC Radio Scotland (14 September 2015) and included in Tom Robinson's BBC Introducing Mixtape on BBC Radio 6 Music on 21 September 2015. "Holy Barnacles" was debuted on Baylen Leonard’s Amazing Radio show, The Front Porch on 5 September 2015.

== Discography ==
- One Zero One Zero One Zero – Planet Groucho Records (2010)
- Mr Asterisk + Fajita's Basement – Planet Groucho Records (2011)
- Fajita's Basement – Planet Groucho Records (2011)
- Squawk! – Planet Groucho Records (2013)
- Possessed by the Gods of Cowbell Oblongata – Planet Groucho Records (2015)
