= Ger Wolfe =

Irish musician (born 1969)

- Born: 1969; Cork city, Ireland
- Genres: Irish folk; singer-songwriter
- Occupations: Musician; songwriter
- Instruments: Vocals; guitar; keyboards; fiddle; accordion
- Years active: 1998–present
- Label: Raggedy Records
- Website: gerwolfe.com

Ger Wolfe is an Irish singer-songwriter, poet, and multi-instrumentalist. Born in Cork city and raised in Mayfield, he has released a series of albums through his independent label, Raggedy Records, beginning with Word and Rhyme in 1998. His songs have been recorded by performers including John Spillane, Karan Casey, and Sharon Shannon.

Wolfe’s work combines contemporary songwriting with influences from Irish folk and traditional music. Wolfe was the subject of the 2010 RTÉ radio documentary Gentle Genius, Forgotten Poet.

== Early life ==
Wolfe grew up in Mayfield on the north side of Cork city. He grew up listening to English ska and reggae, including the music of Bob Marley and the Wailers. He learned to play music informally with friends by listening to records and attempting to identify their lyrics and guitar chords by ear.

At approximately 14, Wolfe began busking with friends on Prince's Street in Cork. He later claimed that busking helped him develop confidence as a performer. His early musical influences included Bob Dylan, the Grateful Dead, Neil Young, Django Reinhardt, and Stéphane Grappelli. He also became interested in the fingerstyle guitar playing of Bert Jansch, whom he saw perform at the Drogheda Folk Club.

== Career ==
During the early 1990s, Wolfe took part in folk and traditional music sessions at the Lobby Bar in Cork, where he also attended concerts and met other musicians. He released his debut album, Word and Rhyme, through his independent label Raggedy Records in 1998. It was followed by Ragged Ground in 2002, Heaven Paints Her Holy Mantle Blue in 2004, and The Velvet Earth in 2006.

Wolfe performed with the New Skylarks, a changing group of backing musicians who accompanied him in concert and on recordings. John Spillane and Annette Buckley contributed vocals to The Velvet Earth. Wolfe's songs were also recorded by other Irish folk musicians, including Karan Casey, John Spillane, Sharon Shannon, and North Cregg. Casey recorded "The Curra Road", while North Cregg made "Summer at My Feet" the title track of one of their albums.

His fifth album, No Bird Sang, was released in 2009. Produced by Peadar Ó Riada at his studio in Cúil Aodha, the album was centered on Wolfe's vocals and acoustic guitar.

In spring 2009, Wolfe was an artist-in-residence in the Muskerry Gaeltacht, where he gathered stories and recollections from older residents for use in new compositions. The project resulted in Fréamh: Root, an album consisting primarily of Irish-language songs, together with instrumental pieces and three songs in English. During this period, Wolfe also taught traditional music in local primary schools and taught a songwriting module at University College Cork.

In 2010, RTE Radio produced a documentary about Wolfe entitled Gentle Genius, Forgotten Poet.

In 2011, he toured with the Ger Wolfe Quartet, comprising Wolfe, bassist Paul Frost, fiddler Edel Sullivan, and accordionist Richard Lucey. The tour received support through a Music Network performance and touring award. His seventh album, I Have Been Loved, was released in 2013.

In 2019, Wolfe released a compilation of earlier songs, Melody Bright and the Favourite Sparrow. In 2020, Music Network commissioned him to write and perform new work for its online Butterfly Sessions series. His ninth album, The Morning Star, followed in 2020.

In 2025, Wolfe released Songs from Freeman's Ballyvourney Collection, twelve songs selected from material collected in the Muskerry Gaeltacht by the English scholar A. Martin Freeman in 1913 and 1914. Wolfe had begun researching the region's sean-nós singing tradition through Acadamh Fódhla and worked on Freeman's transcriptions during the COVID-19 pandemic. The album included songs learned from Freeman's phonetic transcriptions and was accompanied by musicians including Paul Frost, Edel Sullivan, Mick O'Brien, Richard Lucey and Kevin Murphy.

== Musical style and songwriting ==
Wolfe's music has been described as understated contemporary folk. Reviewing I Have Been Loved, Colm O'Hare of Hot Press described his style as combining gentle folk melodies with an easy-going vocal style and carefully constructed lyrical vignettes. The Daily Mirror described his lyrics as having "illuminating insights into everyday life". His recordings frequently use restrained acoustic arrangements; the magazine's review of No Bird Sang noted that much of the album centered on Wolfe's voice and acoustic guitar.

His songwriting often draws upon ordinary experience, relationships, and the natural world. Critics have identified themes including love, regret, hope, homelessness and seasonal change, together with recurring imagery of birds, rivers, rain, flowers and the landscape. Wolfe has described his songs as dealing with the contrasting experiences of life, including joy and sorrow and loss and gain.

Wolfe's songs often evoke a sense of place, particularly the landscape and Muskerry Gaeltacht, he used stories and recollections gathered from local residents as the basis for new works. He writes songs in both English and Irish, and he has drawn upon the sean-nós tradition of Muskerry. Wolfe has distinguished his interpretations from inherited traditional practice, describing himself as a student of the tradition rather than a sean-nós singer by upbringing.

Wolfe's musical influences include Bob Dylan, Neil Young, Bert Jansch, reggae and Irish traditional music. He has particularly praised Young's melodic writing and understated treatment of social subjects, and Jansch's approach to fingerstyle guitar.

== Discography ==
=== Albums ===
- Word & Rhyme (1998)
- Ragged Ground (2002)
- Heaven Paints Her Holy Mantle Blue (2004)
- The Velvet Earth (2006)
- No Bird Sang (2009)
- Fréamh: Root (2011)
- I Have Been Loved (2013)
- Melody Bright and the Favourite Sparrow (2019) – compilation
- The Morning Star (2020)
- Songs from Freeman's Ballyvourney Collection (2025)
