= Strathcarron, Highland =

Coordinates: 57.42384°N 5.42754°W

Strathcarron: Scottish Gaelic: Srath Carrann
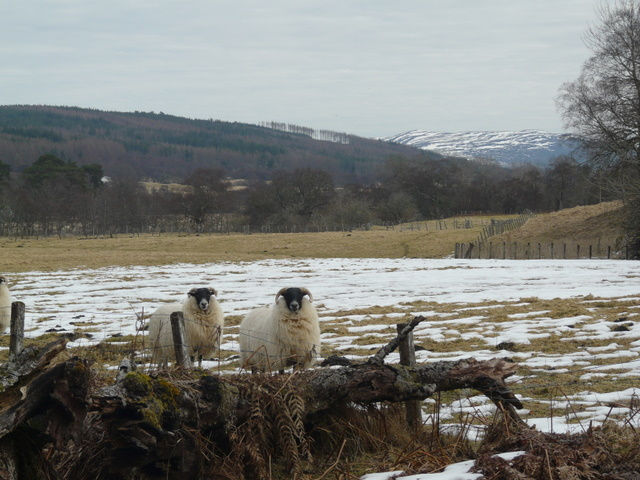
- Curious sheep, Gruinards, Strathcarron

- Location within the Ross and Cromarty area
- OS grid reference: NG943422
- Council area: Highland
- Country: Scotland
- Sovereign state: United Kingdom
- Post town: STRATHCARRON
- Postcode district: IV54 8
- Police: Scotland
- Fire: Scottish
- Ambulance: Scottish
- UK Parliament: Ross, Skye and Lochaber
- Scottish Parliament: Caithness, Sutherland and Ross

Strathcarron (Scottish Gaelic: Srath Carrann) is a hamlet, in the Highland council area of Scotland.

== Geography ==
It is situated at the head of the sea loch, Loch Carron, between the rivers, River Carron and River Taodail, in Wester Ross, Scottish Highlands.

=== Climate ===
Climate data for Bealach na Bà, Elevation: 773 m (2,536 ft), 1991–2020
Month	Jan	Feb	Mar	Apr	May	Jun	Jul	Aug	Sep	Oct	Nov	Dec	Year
Mean daily maximum °C (°F)	2.0 (35.6)	1.7 (35.1)	2.6 (36.7)	5.1 (41.2)	10.0 (50.0)	11.7 (53.1)	12.9 (55.2)	12.6 (54.7)	9.3 (48.7)	6.6 (43.9)	4.0 (39.2)	2.4 (36.3)	6.8 (44.2)
Daily mean °C (°F)	0.2 (32.4)	−0.1 (31.8)	0.6 (33.1)	2.7 (36.9)	6.2 (43.2)	8.4 (47.1)	9.9 (49.8)	9.8 (49.6)	7.4 (45.3)	4.7 (40.5)	2.2 (36.0)	0.6 (33.1)	4.4 (39.9)
Mean daily minimum °C (°F)	−1.7 (28.9)	−2.0 (28.4)	−1.4 (29.5)	0.3 (32.5)	2.5 (36.5)	5.0 (41.0)	6.9 (44.4)	7.0 (44.6)	5.6 (42.1)	2.9 (37.2)	0.4 (32.7)	−1.2 (29.8)	2.1 (35.8)
Source: Met Office

== Amenities ==
It has a hotel called the Strathcarron Hotel and the Strathcarron railway station.

== History ==
The following account is not disputed, but it refers to a different Strathcarron located to the west of Bonar Bridge, about 20 miles north west of Tain. The Strathcarron of this page is some 72 miles west of Tain. In 1854 (before the railway) travel would have been very challenging.

In the spring of 1854, one of the most notorious incidents of resistance to the Highland Clearances took place at Greenyards in Strathcarron, when Major Robertson of Kindeace attempted to evict his tenants to make way for more profitable sheep farming. It was reported by The Inverness Courier that the Sheriff Taylor at the head of about thirty-five men traveled from Tain and arrived at Greenyards at about dawn. Their arrival was expected and they were met by a crowd of about 300 people, two thirds of whom were women. They were all apparently prepared to resist the execution of the law. The women lined up at the front armed with stones and the men at the rear armed with sticks. The Sheriff tried to persuade them not to resist, as did Cummings who was the superintendent of the Ross-shire police. The sheriff reluctantly then had to use force and the police attacked the crowd and dispersed them. However, during the violence, fifteen or sixteen women were seriously hurt, some requiring medical treatment, as the police appeared to have used their batons with great force. The sheriff had served summonses on four tenants. The police tried to capture some of the men, but only captured five women. Sheriff Mackenzie later gave an account in which he said that the large number of people who had arrived to resist had been signaled to the spot by gun-shots. The women who had been captured were taken to the prison at Tain but they were released on bail the next day. The incident, which took place on 31 March 1854, became known as "The Massacre of the Rosses". There was afterwards universal feeling among the people of Ross-shire and Sutherlandshire that the sheriff's conduct was reckless and there was indignation and disgust at the brutality of the policemen on the women which had left pools of blood on the ground. One woman was reported to have died in this encounter.

== Trivia ==
Strathcarron is home to indie-folk musicians The Ramisco Maki Maki Rocking Horse and Oak Hero.
