= The Chapters =

- Origin: Dublin, Ireland
- Genres: Country, folk ensemble
- Label: Loose Windscreen
- Members: Ross McNally; Ciaran Fortune; Michael Murphy; NC Lawlor; Aoife Ruth; Biggles Flys Sgain
- Past members: Turlough Gunawardhana; Simon Eustace
- Website: http://www.thechapters.com/

The Chapters are a six-nine piece band from Dublin, Ireland. The band are composed of Ross McNally, Michael Murphy, Ciaran Fortune, NC Lawlor, Aoife Ruth and Biggles Flys Again. Additional string, brass and guest players join the band on occasion.

The Chapters have featured on a number of radio and television stations in Ireland, including Dublin's 98, Today FM RTÉ 2fm and Phantom FM since the release of their album and have performed at several festivals such as Castlepalooza, Indie-pendence and Oxegen. They also performed at the Arthur's Day celebrations. In 2008, they supported more established musicians such as Chuck Berry, Cathy Davey and Neil Young. Their music has been used by RTÉ as well as by UK broadcaster ITV in its soap opera Emmerdale.

== Style ==
The Chapters have been compared to several artists and bands by the Irish media, including The Blue Nile, Bruce Springsteen, The Frames, and The Hold Steady. The voice of vocalist McNally has been likened to Guy Garvey and Peter Gabriel.

== History ==
Several EPs and singles were released early in the band's career, including "The Indecision of Arthur Molloy" whilst they were signed with Smart As Records. Hot Press heralded the single as "further proof" of "the middle of a new dawn for the Dublin music scene".

The arrival of more difficult financial times almost finished the band off before they had gotten round to recording their debut album. After recording approximately thirty demos of their work, they submitted them to a company which wished to invest in a new record label in Ireland. Contact had been made with internationally recognised producers such as Ethan Johns, with the band hoping to work with producers who had worked with acts such as Kings of Leon or Ryan Adams. However, following the collapse of a bank elsewhere, the company pulled out of the deal, putting the debut album of The Chapters in jeopardy. The band were saved by fellow band The Coronas, with contact being made by Turlough Gunawardhana with lead singer Danny O'Reilly prompting a meeting with their record label 3ú Records who signed them immediately.

Signed by 3ú Records, the lead single, titled "Videotapes", from their debut album was released on 1 May 2009 and launched at The Academy music venue in Dublin the previous night. The Chapters released their debut album Perfect Stranger on 3ú Records, on 5 June 2009. Hot Press praised the album for its "irresistibly catchy tracks" and singled out "Videotapes"—released as a download single— for its "glorious blend of Fleetwood Mac and The Blue Nile". entertainment.ie gave the album three and a half stars out of five, saying that it was "at ease with itself, traversing timelines to be modern without trying to be hip, trendy or cool".

The Chapters played several festivals around Ireland during the summer of 2009. They performed on the Hot Press New Bands Stage at Oxegen 2009 at Punchestown Racecourse in County Kildare on 12 July. They performed at Castlepalooza in Tullamore and Indie-pendence at Mitchelstown in County Cork in early August.

On 23 July 2009, alongside artists and comedians such as Jerry Fish and the Mudbug Club, David Kitt and Eric Lalor, The Chapters performed at a special free event witnessed by two hundred people on board a train as part of the twenty-fifth anniversary celebrations of the Dublin Area Rapid Transit (DART).

Debut single "Videotapes" was played on radio. "Trying to Get Ahead", the second single from Perfect Stranger, was released on 24 July 2009. 3ú Records anticipated that there would be four more singles from that album, a claim which Turlough Gunawardhana has described as "crazy but cool".

The Chapters participated in the Arthur's Day events in Dublin on 24 September 2009. The band performed a half-time show at a Celtic League match between Leinster and Munster and appeared at The Music Show in the RDS. "Moving" was the third single released from the album. They then toured with The Coronas and performed a six-date tour which ended with a show in The Academy on 20 November 2009. They performed at some of the fundraising shows which were organised in the aftermath of the 2010 Haiti earthquake. "Black Room", the fourth single from Perfect Stranger, was released as a digital download on March 5, 2010, accompanied by a national Spring Tour. On March 19, 2010, the band were announced as one of the first acts expected to perform at that year's Indie-pendence. They performed at Livestock in Kells, County Meath on 5 June 2010.

In 2013, after a brief hiatus, The Chapters returned with a change of line-up and musical direction. Their second album, Blood feels warm, had a shift towards simple, heartwarming songwriting and understated but mature musicianship. The current line-up swelled in size for recording and live purposes, adding both grunt and texture with pedal steel, accordion, harp, strings and vocal arrangements to the fore.

== Reviews ==
"Their competent mastery over instruments makes them a pleasure to listen to, they’re accomplished but are never excessive. The songs are the star of the show".

"The Chapters are no newbies on the scene and have spent the last few years honing their aesthetic. Expect something different and more self-assured this time around."

"On a night that highlighted the sonic sea change the Chapters have undergone with their new album Blood feels Warm the group’s ability to capture and expand this change cannot be overstated in a performance of communication and expression."

"The Chapters command the stage like no other drawing the audience in with every note and lyric sung. With each song the listener escapes the world in which they live and enter a new world in which the song is sung. Songs performed with harmonicas to violins to guitars leaves us only wanting more as each one is irresistibly catchy and the harmonies between Ross and Aoife are something to be remembered and cherished as they sing each one flawlessly."

"‘Blood Feels Warm’ sets The Chapters apart from their Indie Pop rock contemporaries, and sees them embrace a more learned style, with more considered songs and overall upping of their game.

== Discography ==
=== Albums ===
- The Indecision of Arthur Molloy (EP)
- Four Thorns EP
- Perfect Stranger Album
- Blood feels warm - April 2013

=== Singles ===
- "Videotapes"
- "Trying to Get Ahead"
- "Moving"
- "Black Room"
