= Majella Murphy =

Majella Murphy is a Kilkenny born singer–songwriter with critical acclaim. Born in 1973 she released one album in 2007 "Brave new world", the first album globally to be released on a mobile phone by Sony Ericsson.

== Music ==
She has played at some of Ireland's biggest festivals including Electric Picnic and has appeared on many TV shows including the 2009 edition of The Raw Sessions

Her style is eclectic and includes many influences including Bob Dylan, Irish Trad, Jimmy MacCarthy and Christy Moore. Often likened to Mary Black she has carved out a niche spot on the Irish music scene. She is a regular contributor to the RTE 1 radio show, the Joe Duffy show. Majella has also been one of the first artists to speak in public of the sexual abuse she endured as a child, taking the perpetrator to court and winning her cases, both criminally and civil in court. She chose to go public to quash the mis-placed shame that is slapped on victims of sexual abuse. She is now working on her second album and first book, which she describes as a thriller, more of the mind than anything else. She is a recovering alcoholic and anorexic/bulimic and lives to sing and play music, to write and be herself. It's a weird story, but one that might be worth listening to, if she's willing to tell it. She appeared on 'The Late Late Show', on 14 January 2011.

Majella has been concentrating on writing stories for the last year. She has just completed a novel called 'The Story So Far' and is in preparation for her next album 'Sublime'. It's a play on words.

On a sporting front, Majella has two All Ireland medals. One for the javelin as a teenager and another gold All Ireland medal for the long puck. She could hit a sliotar (Irish hurling ball) further than any other girl of her age in Ireland. At one stage she played for four Camogie teams at the same time.
