= Alphastates =

Irish electro music band

- Origin: Dublin, Ireland
- Genres: Electro music, electropop
- Years active: 2001–2010
- Label: Magi Records
- Members: Gerry Horan; Stevie Kavanagh; Graham Gilligan
- Past members: Mike O'Dowd; Catherine "Cat" Dowling
- Website: http://www.alphastates.com/

Alphastates were an Irish electro band from Dublin. The band consisted of lead vocalist and guitarist Catherine "Cat" Dowling, guitarist Gerry Horan, bass guitarist Stevie Kavanagh and drummer Graham Gilligan. Former member and drummer Mike O'Dowd departed in 2008.

Alphastates released one extended play called Good Stuff (2003) and two albums: Made From Sand (2004) and Human Nature (2009). Human Nature was rerecorded before its release after the band expressed their unhappiness with the original record. Lead single "Champagne Glass" was a dance hit in New York City. During their existence, they performed in the Phoenix Park and on Other Voices, as well as at music festivals such as Oxegen, Electric Picnic, Indie-pendence and the IMRO Showcase Tour.

Alphastates remained active until 2010 before being "pulled in different directions".

== Style ==
The band's style was described in such terms as "dark", "delicious" and "grand". Their influences included Édith Piaf, Joy Division, Billie Holiday, Portishead, Nina Simone, Tom Waits and Sonic Youth. Vocalist Cat Dowling has been compared to both Beth Gibbons and Shirley Manson and called "a lady with the most evocative vocals in Irish music". Each member contributed to the songwriting process during the band's existence.

== History ==
The band formed in 2001, beginning their existence as Babelfish. They changed their name to Alphastates in June 2003, with one of their first shows under that name occurring at that year's Witnness. As Babelfish they appeared on EmBraces, a 2003 double album of acoustic tracks featuring various Irish and international artists. As Alphastates, they toured with The Beta Band, Deus, Cat Power, Mercury Rev, Sinéad O'Connor and Zero 7. They performed at major European music festivals, including Electric Picnic and Oxegen in their native country. Their music has also featured in films, including one from Belgium.

A July 2003 Hot Press review of a live performance observed how Alphastates "manage to pull off a small triumph" with Dowling's vocals "still remain[ing] their most unique selling point, but they refuse to let themselves become dwarfed by the expanse of the space and even manage a stab at dry-ice-assisted dramatics". In December that year, they released the Good Stuff EP, with Hot Press noting "the attention to detail. Every sound has been meticulously, lovingly crafted; every twist, turn, modulation and crescendo plotted with extreme precision, and, in places, to startling effect". The band's debut album, titled Made From Sand, was released in 2004. RTÉ reviewer Ray Donoghue noted their "ability to incorporate electronic music seamlessly into a mix that will please most ears", while Hot Press said: "It's as sexy as fuck". The song Angel Kiss was a huge internet hit. At this time critics considered Alphastates "one of the most underrated bands on the Irish music scene" as the scene was not as interested in their electronic sound at this time, a contrast to when they released their second album. They performed on Oxegen's Green Room stage in July 2004, and on 11 December 2004 Alphastates recorded a performance for the third series of Other Voices in Dingle which was broadcast on RTÉ Two early the following year. On 4 September 2004, the band performed at the sellout 02 In The Park event held in the Phoenix Park.

The band performed during the IMRO Showcase Tour in Dublin on 4 April 2008. That year also saw the departure of their drummer Mike O'Dowd after the birth of a baby. They played at several music festivals such as that year's Indie-pendence and Electric Picnic 2008 and their music featured on Hot Press's free 16-track Un-Laoised: Irish Acts At Electric Picnic 2008 CD.

After recording their second album Human Nature, Alphastates were not happy and began working on it again from the beginning. During this process Dowling obtained a node in her larynx and subsequently lost her voice for a time. Glen Hansard assisted by directing the band to his voice coach who restored the missing voice. The completed album was released in April 2009. entertainment.ie's Jenny Mulligan gave Human Nature four out of five stars and said it showed the band could "delve further into the realm of danceable pop music [...] If only more Irish bands had this kind of range". Alan Jacques of the Limerick Independent described Human Nature as "one of the best albums of the year". Hot Press called it "an inventive respite from blog-standard guitar-driven formulaic rock". Human Nature was included in Joe Kavanagh's "Top Twenty Irish Albums Of 2009" compiled for The Irish Examiner USA. The band planned to release the record to markets in the UK and US. The singles "Champagne Glass", "Human Nature" and "You Talked I Can Tell" were released from the album. Lead single "Champagne Glass" attracted much interest from dancers in New York City and Arveene and Misk offered to remix it after hearing it.

Alphastates performed their final show at Whelan's in Dublin on 18 February 2010. They later talked about their decision to split in an interview with Hot Press, saying "we're all being pulled in different directions now [...] We all need to express ourselves through our music and were always passionate about what we did. In the end, we didn't feel so passionate and felt it only fair and right to send the angel to bed".

Dowling was absorbed with taking care of her newly born daughter, although expressed interest in releasing a solo album in future. During the final months of the band's existence, she had been heavily pregnant during performances. Horan contributed to numerous soundtracks. Kavanagh still plays music with The Rags.

== Members ==
- Gerry Horan — Guitar, keys
- Stevie Kavanagh — Bass guitar, keys
- Graham Gilligan — Drums

=== Former members ===
- Mike O'Dowd — Drums
- Catherine "Cat" Dowling — Vocals, guitar, keys

== Discography ==
Alphastates released one extended play and two albums.

- Good Stuff EP (2003)
- Made From Sand (2004)
- Human Nature (2009)
