= A. Martin Freeman =

British scholar (1878–1959)

Alexander Martin Freeman (1878 in Tooting, London – 18 December 1959) was a scholar of medieval Irish texts and collector of Irish music. A native of Surrey, he was educated at Bedford Grammar School and Lincoln College, Oxford. He married a lady from Donegal.

He collected traditional songs from older generations of singers in the West Cork Gaeltacht (Irish-speaking area) of Ballyvourney, County Cork, during 1913/14, which became the Ballyvourney Collection.His Ballyvourney collection featured as numbers 23–25 of the Journal of the Folk Song Society, 1920–21. This collection consists of almost a hundred songs, with original texts, prose translations and annotations, constituting incomparably the finest collection published in our time of Irish songs noted from oral tradition.

His other works of scholarship are varied, and includes his edition of Annals of Connacht (1944), his magnum opus.

He was on the Publication Committee for the Irish Folk Song Society from 1920 until 1939, when the society was dissolved. He contributed songs and texts occasionally to the Journal of the English Folk Dance and Song Society. He sat on the editorial board of the Society as a member.

A lecture was given by Iarla Ó Lionáird on his Muskery Collection in Cork University on 30 January 2014.

== Works ==
- Freeman, A. Martin (1920–1921). "Ballyvourney Collection (Irish songs)". Journal of the Folk-Song Society. 6 (23, 24, 25): xiii–xxvii, index, p. 355. JSTOR 4434091
