= Trees Dream in Algebra =

Studio album by Codes
- Released: 18 September 2009
- Recorded: November 2008
- Studio: Modern World Studios, Gloucestershire
- Genre: Alternative rock; new prog; space rock; progressive metal
- Length: 51:41
- Label: Independent
- Producer: Greg Haver, Codes

Singles from Trees Dream in Algebra
- 1. "This Is Goodbye"; 2. "Starry Eyed"

Trees Dream in Algebra is the first studio album from Irish alternative-rock group Codes.

== Track listing ==
All tracks are written by Codes.

Original edition
No.	Title	Length
1.	"Malfunctions"	2:30
2.	"This Is Goodbye"	3:05
3.	"Guided By Ghosts"	2:50
4.	"Our Mysteries (Missed Histories)"	4:21
5.	"In Algebra"	3:55
6.	"Telos"	3:12
7.	"Memorial"	4:18
8.	"Starry Eyed"	4:31
9.	"Truer Words"	4:47
10.	"Cities"	3:37
11.	"Magnetic North"	4:56
12.	"You Are Here"	4:35
13.	"4 Winters"	6:34
Total length:		53:21

Bonus Track iTunes
No.	Title	Length
14.	"Threadbare"	3:42

=== Peak positions ===
Chart	Peak position
Irish Albums Chart	18
