= Rapal =

Rapal is a BBC Alba music television programme and radio show on BBC Radio nan Gàidheal recorded at BBC Scotland's Pacific Quay HQ. Rapal broadcast its first programme on the radio on 28 May 2001, presented by Niall Iain McDonald. It expanded to TV in 2007, and added Anndra Robasdan and Michelle NicDhomhnaill to the presenting team. In 2007, Rapal launched a contest for the best new Gaelic song, and in 2008 the show was added to the roster of programmes to be broadcast on the new Gaelic Digital TV channel, BBC Alba.

The Rapal TV show featured a strong selection of Scotland's up-and-coming acts, with presenter Vic Galloway showcasing a section featuring his favourites. Acts featured on Rapal included The Amazing Snakeheads, The Moon Kids and Frightened Rabbit.

As of 2021, The BBC Radio show is presented by Emma NicAonghais (now NicLaomainn) and Coinneach Mac a' Ghobhainn.

== Winners of the Rapal Gaelic song contest ==
- 2007: The Picturebooks – "Rockonica Bhearonica"
- 2008: Na Gathan – "Ruigidh Sinn Màrs"
- 2009: Niteworks – "Nam aonar 's a Fonn"
- 2010: Dòl Eoin – "An Gairm" (The Calling)
- 2012: The Ramisco Maki Maki Rocking Horse – "Seas Air Do Chorra-bhiod"
