= R.S.A.G. =

- Also known as: Rarely Seen Above Ground (R.S.A.G.)
- Born: Jeremy Michael Hickey
- Origin: Kilkenny, Ireland
- Occupation: Musician
- Instruments: Drums, vocals, bass, guitar, synths, percussion
- Years active: 2007–present
- Label: Reckless Records
- Formerly of: Blue Ghost

Jeremy Hickey (also known as Rarely Seen Above Ground—abbreviated as R.S.A.G.—) is an Irish multi-instrumentalist and producer from Kilkenny. He has released four albums and one EP. Rarely Seen Above Ground (2007) Organic Sampler (2008) Be It Right Or Wrong (2010)Rotate EP (2013) and Chroma (2020).

R.S.A.G released his debut double album Organic Sampler which received a Choice Music Prize nomination for Irish Album of the Year 2008 along with a 5 star review from the Irish Times. His follow up "Be It Right Or Wrong" was also received with critical acclaimed and earned him 5 stars in the RTE ten magazine. 2013's "Rotate EP" was named as one Nialler 9's top 10 EP's that year. His latest album "Chroma" which is hailed as his finest piece of work to date was released on 29 May. The Irish Times calling it 'One of the best Irish albums of 2020'. His live show has been a staple of the Irish Festival scene for years. He has performed at several festivals, including Castlepalooza, Electric Picnic and Body & Soul

== Style ==
Hickey is influenced by bands such as Joy Division, Talking Heads, Primal Scream, Jon Hopkins and Tony Allen. As R.S.A.G., he is a solo drummer performer but alongside a virtual band who are projected onto a screen in a manner which has been likened to Gorillaz. Jeremy Hickey appears as the guitarist and bassist on screen in the background, although they are controlled by another Kilkenny man, Paul Mahon.

== Career ==
Hickey began his musical career as the drummer in a Kilkenny band called Blue Ghost. He headlined the Body and Soul Area at Electric Picnic 2008, 2009, 2013.

== Discography ==
=== Studio albums ===
Year	Album details	Peak chart positions	
Year	Album details	IRL	UK
2008	Organic Sampler: Released: 2008; Label: Formats: CD, Download	—	—
2010	Be It Right Or Wrong: Released: 11 June 2010; Label: A Rare Production; Formats: CD, Download	—	—
2013	Rotate EP: Released 12 July 2013; Label: Independent release; Formats: CD, download	—	
"—" denotes releases that did not chart.

== Organic Sampler ==
Hickey's debut album as R.S.A.G., Organic Sampler which was launched in 2008, had a bonus disc of "mostly instrumental doodles" which was effectively an album Hickey had previously released. Analogue commented that the best part of the album featured Hickey's "heavy bass and dominant percussion [...] nicely complimented [sic] by his sometimes guttural voice". entertainment.ie gave the album four out of five stars, saying it was an "extraordinary" and "wondrous debut album" and remarking that "there's a magic about Organic Sampler that means every listen will unearth new surprises". Jim Carroll, writing in The Irish Times, said Organic Sampler was "such a wow", its songs were "compelling, dramatic and exciting" and that the artist's "sense of scale and ambition is remarkable" and "his grooves are extraordinary". Una Mullally, writing in the Sunday Tribune, also gave Organic Sampler four out of five stars and remarked on the "mazes of bass jams, resourceful rhythms and malleable vocals [which] create an intriguing, occasionally creepy, whirlpool of sound". R.S.A.G. appeared on the television series Other Voices.

R.S.A.G. appeared on The Raw Sessions, an interactive music television programme broadcast on RTÉ Two in 2009. Hickey described the show as "great thing" and made his debut on the first episode which was broadcast on 12 May 2009. R.S.A.G. recorded "All Along That Road", whilst Sweet Jane who also appeared in that episode, recorded "Black Eyes", both at Sun Studios. R.S.A.G. won the first heat and a prize of recording an original track at Grouse Lodge, County Westmeath. He next appeared in the sixth episode of the series which was broadcast on 16 June 2009. He recorded the track "Movement" whilst Dirty Epics recorded "White Out", both with producers Leo Pearson and Ken McHugh at Grouse Lodge. Both acts had eighteen hours to record an original song. The three acts with the most votes (and downloads) progressed to the final. The final was recorded live at the Button Factory music venue in Dublin on 26 June 2009, before being broadcast on 30 June 2009. It featured performances from the top three artists; Dirty Epics, The Infomatics and R.S.A.G. The winner, The Infomatics, was announced on 4 July 2009.

R.S.A.G. performed on the Red Bull Music Academy Stage at Oxegen 2009, arriving on stage half an hour late. Jim Carroll called the performance "a robust, beaty and meaty fare, a fabulous mash-up from the Marble City which is one part hardcore-punk to three parts heavyweight funk". He also performed at Castlepalooza several weeks later. He is currently working on a new album.

R.S.A.G. has also worked with Super Extra Bonus Party.

== Be It Right Or Wrong ==
Be It Right Or Wrong, R.S.A.G.'s third album was released 11 June 2010 release, preceded by the single "The Roamer".

== Awards ==
Organic Sampler received a Choice Music Prize nomination for the Irish Album of the Year 2008 on 14 January 2009. The award was won by Jape for the album Ritual on 4 March 2009. R.S.A.G. was amongst six of the nominees who performed during the live ceremony in Vicar Street, Dublin.

Year	Nominee / work	Award	Result
2009	Organic Sampler	Irish Album of the Year 2008	Nominated
