= The Botanic Inn =

Coordinates: 54°34′52″N 5°56′19″W

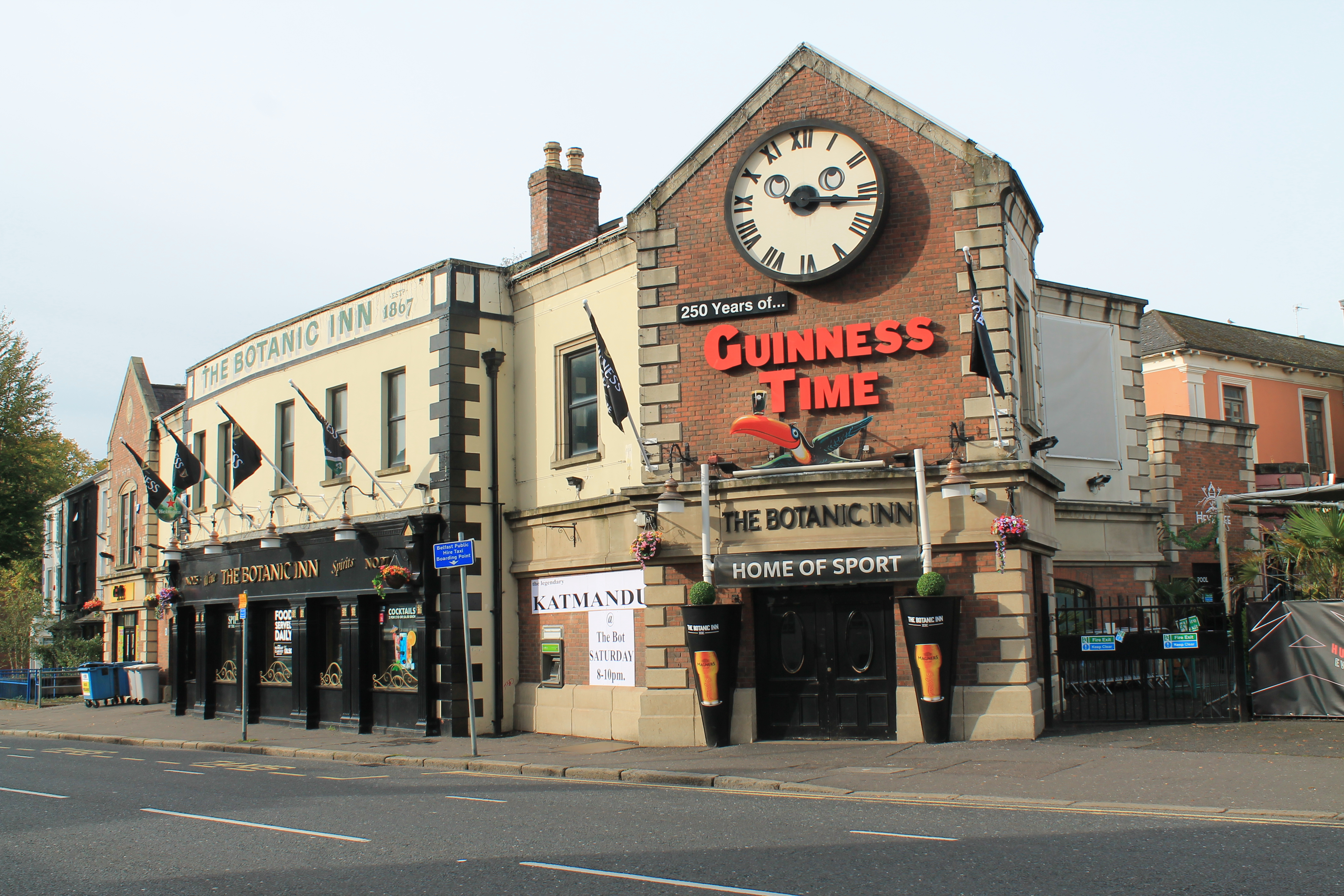
The Botanic Inn

The Botanic Inn, affectionately known as "The Bot", is a bar/nightclub situated near Botanic Gardens in the Queen's Quarter of Belfast, Northern Ireland. Owned by the Moony Hotel Group, formerly the Botanic Inn Group as of 2016.

It has been noted as an example of Victorian architecture in Northern Ireland.

A writer for the Sunday Mirror in London wrote: "If I could own any bar in Belfast, purely for profit, it would be this one."
