= Codes (band) =

Irish indie electronic band

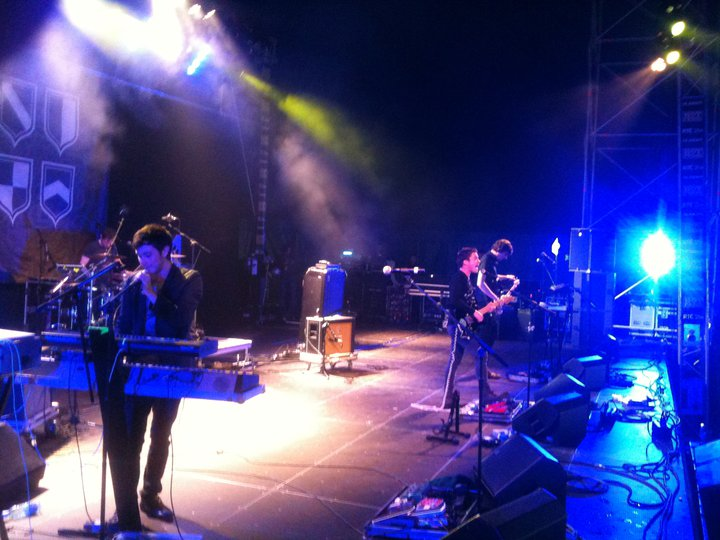
- Codes performing at Electric Picnic 2011 in Ireland. From left to right: Paul Reilly, Raymond Hogge, Daragh Anderson and Eoin Stephens

Background information
- Origin: Dublin, Ireland
- Genres: Indie Rock; Electronica
- Years active: 2007–present
- Labels: Interior Records 2008 – 2009; EMI Ireland 2009 – 2010
- Members: Daragh Anderson; Eoin Stephens; Raymond Hogge; Alex Mummery
- Past members: Paul Reilly; Niall Woods; Stephen Burke
- Website: codes.ie

Codes are an Irish indie electronic quartet from Dublin, consisting of Daragh Anderson, Eoin Stephens, Niall Woods and Raymond Hogge. Their debut album Trees Dream in Algebra was nominated for the 2010 Choice Music Prize.

== History ==
=== Formation ===
Codes formed in late 2007 when all members – who had been friends for several years – found themselves available to compose and play music together. Previously, Daragh and former member Paul Reilly had played in an early version of the group, alongside Alan Greene and Stephen Burke. Raymond – who had just recently moved to Dublin left a band that he was involved with.

=== Debut album (2008–2010) ===
In early 2008, they released two independent singles –"This is Goodbye" and "Guided by Ghosts", that both entered the Irish top 50 at number 32 and number 43 respectively. Both singles were well received critically, helped towards a growing fan base and secured the band their first major shows, including a slot on the IMRO Showcase Tour and the Oxegen music festival in Ireland.

In late 2008, the band began to demo songs for their debut album. Not content with waiting for a record label to pick them up they decided to go ahead and record and finance their debut album themselves, resulting in each member taking out a loan to fund the recording. The album was recorded in November 2008 at Modern World Studios in Gloucestershire, UK, with Manic Street Preachers producer Greg Haver.

In early 2009, the band secured a short touring support slot with UK group Keane, culminating at the O2 Arena in Dublin. The band still cites these shows as the biggest they've played at the time, with over 10,000 people seeing them each night. The group had also begun to play their first headline shows in small venues in London shortly after.

Around the same time, the band were pitching their album 'Trees Dream in Algebra' to several labels before finally licensing it to EMI Ireland for a 1-year period in May 2009. Shortly after, it was announced that Codes' debut album 'Trees Dream in Algebra' would be released on 18 September 2009. Upon its release, the album was met with acclaim from critics and fans alike. It was nominated for the 2010 Choice Music Prize in Ireland, voted best Irish album of 2009 by Phantom FM and helped the band get noted as one of HMVs' "Next Big Thing for 2010".

=== Touring (2010–present) ===
Throughout 2010 the band toured extensively, playing festivals such as Oxegen, Castlepalooza, Sea Sessions as well as their first series of headline shows across Ireland, while also securing support slots with L.A. indie group The Airborne Toxic Event, in both the UK and Ireland. While promoting Trees Dream in Algebra in the United Kingdom, the group were also busy writing new material for their second album with some songs already being showcased at current shows.

Summer 2012 saw a change in the line-up of the band with the departure of Paul Reilly, for personal reasons, and the joining of Niall Woods.

In February 2013, the group uploaded a live version of a new track called "Triangulum" to their website. This new track showcased the groups' dramatic change from an alternative rock sound to one far more aggressive.

== Awards ==
Codes's debut album Trees Dream in Algebra was nominated for the Choice Music Prize for Irish Album of the Year 2009 in January 2010.

| Year | Nominee / work | Award | Result |
|---|---|---|---|
| 2010 | Trees Dream in Algebra | Choice Music Prize: Irish Album of the Year 2009 | Nominated |
| 2010 | Trees Dream in Algebra | Phantom FM Best Irish Album 2009 | Won |
| 2010 | Codes | entertainment.ie Awards, Best Irish Band of 2009 | Won |
| 2011 | Codes | Irish Festival Awards, Best Irish Band 2010 | Nominated |

== Discography ==
=== Studio albums ===
| Year | Album details | Peak chart positions |
| Year | Album details | IRL |
|---|---|---|
| 2009 | Trees Dream in Algebra: Released: 18 September 2009; Label: EMI; Formats: CD, Download; Produced By: Greg Haver and Codes | 18 |
| 2015 | AALTARS: Released: 18 September 2015; Label: Independent; Formats: CD, Download; Produced By: Codes | 27 |

=== Singles ===
| Year | Single | Peak chart positions | | | Album |
| Year | Single | IRL | UK | UK Indie | Album |
|---|---|---|---|---|---|
| 2007 | "Edith" | 39 | — | — | Independent Single |
| 2008 | "This Is Goodbye" | 32 | — | — | Independent Single |
| 2008 | "Guided By Ghosts" | 43 | — | — | Independent Single |
| 2009 | "This is Goodbye" | — | — | — | Trees Dream in Algebra |
| 2010 | "Starry Eyed" | — | — | — | Trees Dream in Algebra |
| 2014 | "Astraea" | — | — | — | TBA |
