= Niall Iain MacDonald =

Scottish Gaelic-language radio and television producer

Niall Iain MacDonald (Scottish Gaelic: Niall Iain Dòmhnallach) is a Scottish Gaelic-language radio and television producer for BBC Scotland, and presenter of the popular rock and indie music program, Rapal, for BBC Radio nan Gàidheal.

== Early life ==
He was born in Aberdeen and educated at Millburn Academy in Inverness.

== Media career ==
He joined BBC Scotland in 1998. He was the 2005 winner of the Radio Personality of the Year at the Celtic Film and Television Festival.

== Personal life ==
A missing persons search for MacDonald began on 17 May 2007. He had been seen leaving Stornoway but hadn't been in contact with relatives or colleagues. He had spent some time alone on the hills. After two weeks he returned home.

To raise awareness of mental health issues, MacDonald undertook a solo row of the Minch between Stornoway and Ullapool on 16 July 2008 and completed the 43-mile row in 26 hours. In November 2011 he was rescued half-way through a 100-mile row from Barra to Lewis after an oar snapped. In June 2014 he embarked upon a solo row from New York to Stornoway in a 24-foot rowing boat that was expected to take three months. He was forced to abandon the attempt after nine days, having sustained injuries in stormy conditions. The boat was later salvaged and he appealed for help with the cost of this.

MacDonald was also a shinty player and was signed for Lewis Camanachd in Lewis. He is now retired but retains an interest in the sport, presenting the trophy at the Hebridean Celtic Festival Cup in 2009.
