= State (magazine) =

Irish website and former monthly music magazine

- State Issue #1 (April 2008)
- Editor: Phil Udell
- Categories: Music
- Frequency: 12 per year
- Publisher: Roger Woolman
- Founded: 2008
- First issue: April 2008
- Final issue: January 2009 (print); January 2020 (web)
- Country: Ireland
- Language: English
- Website: www.state.ie
- ISSN: 2009-0897

State.ie (formerly State Magazine) was an Irish website and, before, a monthly music magazine. It launched in April 2008 and switched to online-only distribution in January 2009 after having published a total of ten issues. The magazine continued online until 2020, when that year's edition of its Faces series prominently mentioned the website having ceased publication.

It enjoyed a good run and was voted Best Music Site in 2008 and Best Web Publication in 2010 in the Irish Web Awards. Originally, the concept of the magazine involved a hard copy of which there was a charge to purchase. However after six issues it was decided to make the magazine's content free both online and in print. The first issue, April 2008, appeared on Irish shelves on 6 March 2008 and featured Michael Stipe of R.E.M. on the cover. This immediately garnered comparisons between the new magazine's similarities with Hot Press who featured Stipe on their cover at the same time, a move widely thought to be an attempt by Hot Press to stifle State's status as a serious 'alternative' to the more established local magazine. At a price of €5.50, State charged €2 more than Hot Press.

State was published by Roger Woolman and edited by Hot Press alumni Phil Udell. Contributors included Evening Herald columnist, The Irish Times reviewer and blogger Sinéad Gleeson, Rolling Stone writer Kara Manning, award-winning blogger Niall Byrne (a.k.a. Nialler9), Event Guide writer David O'Mahony and The Star feature writer Tanya Sweeney. The magazine's art director, Simon Roche, was named designer of the year by the Periodical Publishers Association of Ireland in December 2008.

From October 2008 until January 2009 the magazine was made available for free of charge from a number of venues around Ireland's major cities and online from the magazine's website, following a number of other magazines such as Mongrel, Connected and Analogue Magazine in providing their print content free of charge. The first freely distributed issue of State featured Kings of Leon on the cover. After January 2009, the magazine was only available online from its website.

== Issues ==
The first six issues were available for a fee.

#	Date of publication	Cover star	Details	Link
1	6 March 2008	Michael Stipe	Goldfrapp, The Jimmy Cake, Cadence Weapon, Stiff Little Fingers, The Kooks	
2	3 April 2008	Muse	Portishead, Jape, SXSW	
3	1 May 2008	Gemma Hayes	Republic of Loose, The National, Mick Jagger	
4	5 June 2008	Iggy Pop	Damien Dempsey, Alanis Morissette & Martha Wainwright, The Ting Tings	
5	3 July 2008	Interpol	Tricky, The Hold Steady, Pendulum, Justin Timberlake	
6	7 August 2008	ABBA	Electric Picnic 2008: Tinariwen, David Holmes, Oppenheimer, Tindersticks, That Petrol Emotion, Bodytonic, Pivot	

== Cross-border collaborations ==
State.ie linked up with AU magazine of Belfast in 2009 to co-host what was described as "a series of cross-border gigs" designed to promote Northern Irish musicians in Ireland. Alphastates, And So I Watch You From Afar and Conor O'Brien of Villagers and The Immediate all featured.
