= Reemo (band) =

Irish rock band

- Origin: Dublin, Ireland
- Genre: Rock
- Years active: 2004–2009
- Label: Reekus
- Past members: Igor Biasini; Alan Connolly; Steven Connolly; Conleth Dunne; Paul McGlue; David Reardon

Reemo were an Irish rock band who had two hit singles in Ireland in 2007.

== History ==
Formed in Dublin in 2004 by Steven Connolly and David Reardon, the band expanded to include guitarist Paul McGlue, Conleth Dunne, and Steven's brother Alan Connolly. Later based in Sallins, County Kildare, Reardon left the band and Reemo won the 'Best International Band' award at the New York International Music Festival in November 2004. In 2005 they toured with The Revs and released the Music Box EP.

Their first single "Who you Are"/"Line" reached number 35 on the IRMA Chart, while second single "Rushin Man" spent five weeks on the chart, peaking at number 33.

Italian keyboard player/guitarist Igor Biasini joined in 2008. Debut album Colours was released in 2009. to both critical acclaim and criticism. Working with producers on the album such as Martin Quinn of JAM Studios (Turn, Koda Kid, Audio Fires) and Marc Carolan of Suite studios (Muse, Snow Patrol, the Cure) the album was described as "a mature energetic collection, that bristles with fun, whilst encapsulating the trials and tribulations of life. It captures the mind and gives us a new view on the rock genre with melodic songs driven by dance beats and memorable hooks that stick in your head".

Sinéad Gleeson, reviewing the album for the Irish Times, called it "jaded and dated" However the majority of critics received the album quite highly. Singles, "Chocolate Covered Gorgeous, "Sometimes", and "Cuba part 1 – The story so far" preceded the album. 'Chocolate Covered Gorgeous', was championed by cool rock radio Phantom, and received extensive airplay, and the band clocked up a number of memorable live shows.

== Members ==
- Steven Connolly – vocals, rhythm guitar
- Paul McGlue – backing vocals, lead guitar
- Alan Connolly – backing vocals, percussion
- Conleth Dunne – backing vocals, bass guitar
- David Reardon (left 2004)
- Igor Biasini – keyboards, guitar

== Discography ==
=== Albums ===
- Colours (2009), Reekus

1. "Run"
2. "Holocoust"
3. "One Day"
4. "Chocolate Covered Gorgeous"
5. "Cuba part 1 – the Story So Far"
6. "Circus"
7. "Vampires – a Song for Amy"
8. "Sometimes"
9. "Dancing lights – the Ballad of JC"
10. "Cuba part 2 – the Prequel"
11. "Tsunami"

=== EPs ===
- Music Box EP (2005)

1. "Another Day"
2. "Beautiful You"
3. "Circus"
4. "Superman"
5. "Feather (Tell Me)"

=== Singles ===
- "Rushin' Man"/"Too Late Too Far" (2007)
- "Who You Are"/"Line"/"Turn" (2007)
- "Sometimes" (2009)
- "Chocolate Covered Gorgeous" (2009)
