= Lilygreen & Maguire =

- Origin: Newport / Blackwood
- Genres: Pop Rock
- Years active: 2011–January 2014
- Labels: Warner Bros. Records / Warner Music Group (2011-2013)
- Members: Jon Lilygreen; Jon Maguire
- Website: lilygreenandmaguire.com

Lilygreen & Maguire are a Welsh pop rock duo formed in 2011. Jon Lilygreen and Jon Maguire signed with Warner Bros. Records in 2011 and have since released three singles, Given Up Giving Up, Ain't Love Crazy and Come On Get Higher.

== Music career ==
=== 2011: Formation ===
Before forming Lilygreen & Maguire both members were heavily involved in music. Lilygreen was Cyprus' 2010 entry to the Eurovision Song Contest in Oslo and Jon Maguire was producing music and a former member of Pop Punk band The Story So Far. Also, they were both in the band Editions. The pair met while Lilygreen was performing covers at an open mic night at the Kama Lounge in Newport.

=== 2012-2014: Have a Good Time All the Time ===
In 2012 Lilygreen & Maguire have supported Olly Murs and Westlife on their UK arena tours. The duo also did an open-air busking tour of Wales, stopping at Bangor, Wrexham, Aberystwyth, Carmarthen, Swansea, Barry, Caerleon, Caerphilly, Cardiff and Newport. In October 2012 they have supported Scouting For Girls on tour also. In November 2012, Lilygreen & Maguire announced via Twitter that they would be releasing a new single in 2013 called "Dear Photograph". The song was inspired by the popular blog Dear Photograph. They have teamed up with Taylor Jones who runs DearPhotograph.com to construct the music video. They were due to release their debut studio album Have a Good Time All the Time on 4 November 2013, including previous singles, B-Sides and brand new songs.

=== 2014: Breakup ===
Lilygreen and Maguire announced in January 2014 on their Facebook page that they are splitting up because '2013 was a tough year'. In June 2014 they announced that they were reforming, and soon released the single 'Counting Cars'.

=== Songwriting ===
As songwriters the duo have worked alongside writers such as Gregg Alexander, Roy Stride, Peter Vettese, Ricky Ross and Karen Poole.

== Discography ==
=== Studio albums ===
Title	Album details
Have a Good Time All the Time	Released: 4 November 2013; Label: Self-released; Formats: Digital download, CD

=== Extended plays ===
Title	Album details
Roll On	Released: 4 March 2013; Label: Self-released; Formats: Digital download

=== Singles ===
Year	Title	Peak chart positions	Album
Year	Title	UK	Album
2012	"Come On Get Higher"	—	Non-album single
2012	"Ain't Love Crazy"	66	Have a Good Time All the Time
2012	"Given Up, Giving Up"	141	Have a Good Time All the Time
"—" denotes single that did not chart or was not released.
