= The Music Show (Ireland) =

- Dates: First weekend in October
- Locations: RDS, Dublin, Ireland
- Website: www.themusicshow.ie

The Music Show was an annual event which took place in the RDS, Dublin on the first weekend of October each year. The event combined live performances, music workshops and talks given by professionals within the music industry. It had several high-profile sponsors, including Hot Press, RTÉ 2fm, the Irish Independent and the Sunday Independent. RTÉ 2fm provided live radio coverage of the event.

The 2009 event was the largest music event ever staged in Ireland.

== History ==
=== 2008 event ===
The 2008 event took place on 4–5 October. There were performances throughout the weekend from The Blizzards, The Coronas, Cathy Davey, Damien Dempsey, Ham Sandwich, Dispatches, Declan O'Rourke, Fionn Regan and Republic of Loose. The Coronas were "mobbed by crowds of fans" according to Colin Bartley in the Irish Independent, and had to be assisted in leaving the event. Mike Terrana performed solo on the drums. An award for Live Music Venue of the Year was presented to Vicar Street, believed by Hot Press readers to be most deserving, whilst Cork's Cypress Avenue and Mullingar's The Stables were also given consolation prizes. A panel discussion on the topic "Songs Should Have Some Bloody Meaning!" featured contributions from Sharon Corr, Ronan Hardiman, Dave Odlum and Mick Pyro, with hundreds of people being refused entry such was its popularity. Other attendees included Julie Feeney and Neil Jordan.

=== 2009 event ===
The 2009 event took place on 3–4 October. It was launched on 26 August by The Script in Westin Hotel, Dublin. Irish Minister for Arts, Sport and Tourism Martin Cullen commented "the popularity of all kinds of music produced in this country also has a very positive impact in promoting Ireland as a tourist location and enhancing further the reputation of our country's creative endeavours", saying "The Music Show provides a contemporary showcase to display all that is great about music in Ireland".

The 2009 event featured the global premiere of some new musical equipment, such as the iPad touchscreen and the MA amplifier. Some guitars owned by Rory Gallagher were on show throughout the weekend. Performers included The Blizzards, The Chapters, The Coronas, Delorentos, Director, David Kitt, Imelda May, Republic of Loose and Villagers. Interviewees included Glen Hansard and Christy Moore. Other professionals to attend include Nick Angel, David Arnold, Jim Kerr, MayKay, Nick Seymour, Jim Sheridan and Liberty Global Vice-president Shane O'Neill. Camille O'Sullivan criticised television talent shows, saying those who participate are "being treated like guinea pigs" and that "somebody wins and has a hit and everybody gets bored with them after two months". Theo Dorgan criticised An Bord Snip on their "fucking arrogance", saying that "a 12-year-old retarded child on speed wouldn't come up with this nonsense".

MayKay was also announced to DJ at an "After Dark" showcase to follow the first day of the main event.

=== 2010 event ===
The 2010 event took place on 2–3 October. It featured, among other things, the premiere of the music promo for Killing Bono, a discussion on the state of broadcasting, and Andy Gill talk on music and technology, songwriting tips from Brian Kennedy and Andy Cairns of Therapy?, a debate between the music industry and the government, calls for an improvement in funding, and a discussion on "The Crisis in Music".

== See also ==
- IMRO Live Music Venue of the Year Awards – first awarded here in 2008
