= Yngve Wieland =

German-English musician

Yngve Wieland (born 9 November 1983) is a musician, singer, and songwriter, based in London, United Kingdom. Born in Kaiserslautern, Germany and originally based in Cliffony in County Sligo, Yngve began working as a solo artist in Ireland, releasing two EPs and one album between 2006 and 2009. Album track "Little Boy" from second EP Tell Men This was nominated in the "Best Solo Male" category at the inaugural Irish Music Television Awards in 2009, following its selection by Irish music magazine Hot Press to have a video made for it by Kellye Carnahan, a student at New York Tisch School of the Arts.

Following the 2008 release of Tell Men This Yngve, he moved from Dublin to Clapton in London and formed his band "The Innocent" with his brother Demian Wieland, pianist Ned Cartwright and bass player Palmi Gunnlaugur Hjaltason. 2009 EP Have You No Love features most of "The Innocent". Releases from 2010 onwards have been credited to "Yngve & The Innocent", signifying the increasing influence of the band on Yngve's work.

In January 2010, Palmi Hjaltason left "The Innocent", having recorded the material for new EP release Nothing Was Delivered Palmi was replaced by Simon Brown on bass. The band appeared at Secret Garden Party and BBC Blast as well as touring Ireland extensively. 2011 saw the release of the single "Draw A Line" and further touring. Festival appearances included slots at Barn on the Farm, Aeon Festival and Navan Live; they have also featured regularly at The Windmill, Brixton and at The Elgin pub on Ladbroke Grove. Yngve has made over 300 appearances as an artist.
