= The Kazoo Funk Orchestra =

- The Kazoo Funk Orchestra performing at the Queen Margaret Union, Glasgow, Scotland

Background information
- Origin: Glasgow, Scotland
- Genres: Indie, Pop, Experimental rock
- Years active: 2005–present
- Labels: Planet Groucho Records
- Members: Big Beard, Boyce, Mr Bruff, Part-Time Dave, Glowstick Girl
- Website: www.kazoofunk.co.uk

The Kazoo Funk Orchestra are a music collective from Glasgow, Scotland.

== Biography ==
The Kazoo Funk Orchestra formed in Scotland at the end of 2005, as a pre-apocalyptic merry-go-round collective, featuring musicians, anti-poets, dancers and finger painters. Building their melodies at a DIY project studio in producer Ray McCartney's living room, the band exchanged influences and took inspiration from various genres to create their eclectic mix-tape sound.

In May 2006, the band released their 25-track debut album, Midnight Finger Painter, in which the first 500 copies included a unique finger painting created by fans and band members. This was followed by a handful of local gigs, before Adventures in Fuzzy Felt Land was released as a thirteen track EP in January 2007.

In the summer of 2007, the collective undertook their first UK tour, including a couple of festival dates. The latter included a slot in the Solus Tent at the 2008 Wickerman Festival.

During the winter of 2007–2008, the band released This Album is Self Titled, their second LP.

A recorded session was aired on BBC Alba in January 2009.

== Achievements ==
- Received radio airplay on XFM Scotland and BBC Radio.
- Nominated for an Indy Award in 2008.
- Interviewed on Greek TV show, Art Uber Alles.
- Featured on King Tut's Wah Wah Hut's YourSound compilation album, Best of Term One.

== Discography ==
- Midnight Finger Painter (2006)
- Santa's Dead (2006)
- Adventures in Fuzzy Felt Land (2007)
- This Album is Self Titled (2008)
- Motion Sickness (2008)
- Defunked (2011)

== Members ==
=== Current members ===
- Big Beard
- Boyce
- Mr Bruff
- Part-Time Dave
- Glowstick Girl

=== Past members ===
- Little Beard
- Country Bumkin
- Mia Funkyslice
- Loop de Loop
- Herbal
- Mechanical
- Smalls
- El Baterista
- Blunder
- Grum
- Krash Slaughta (II Tone Committee, All Time High, Monkey Mafia)
- Jim 'N' Tonic
- T-Bone (aka Nunny Boy of All Time High)
- Lozzi Kazoo
