= This Club =

Music band

This Club are an indie rock band from Dublin formed in 2006 under the name Hoarsebox and consists of Johnny Holden (Keyboards & Vocals), Philip Broadbery (Guitar & Vocals), Kieran Walkin (Bass & Vocals) and Max Carpio (Drums & Vocals).

== Discography ==
In 2008 the band released the 5-track EP Cuckooland on the independent Roseland Music label which garnered a good review from online music magazine Drop D. Notably, the band have put much effort into their videos and were nominated for "Best Newcomer" at the first Irish Music Video Awards in October 2009 for the video for the song All I Need Now from Cuckooland.

This Club released a double A-side of the tracks Work Party and Inside Out in late 2009. Work Party featured in an episode of the US TV show The Lazy Environmentalist.
