= 3Arena =

3Arena may refer to the following:

- 3Arena (Dublin), an indoor entertainment venue in Dublin, Ireland
- 3Arena (Stockholm), a stadium in Stockholm, Sweden
