= Dirty Epics =

Irish band

- Origin: Greystones; County Wicklow; Ireland
- Genres: Pop, punk rock, new wave
- Years active: 2006–2014
- Label: SCAR Records
- Members: Sarah Jane "SJ" Wai; Richie Power; Darren McCoy; Gary Nethaway
- Past members: Cormac Farrell; Vince Lim; Alan Delaney
- Website: MySpace

Dirty Epics were a four-piece Irish new wave band formed in Greystones, County Wicklow, before relocating to Dublin. They were composed of vocalist Sarah Jane "SJ" Wai, bassist Richie Power, guitarist Darren McCoy and drummer Alan Delaney and were managed by Nadine O'Flynn. They have performed at numerous festivals and on television shows.

Dirty Epics are best known for songs such as "The Cure", "We're Coming Up" and "White Out". Their debut album, Straight In No Kissing, was released in 2008 and the band signed a distribution deal with Universal Music Group for it. In 2009, they competed in The Raw Sessions, progressing to the final. In 2010, one of their songs featured in British teen drama Skins and the band returned to SXSW.

== Musical style ==
The sound of Dirty Epics has been described as "a mix of the New York Dolls, Joy Division and the Pixies with Bob Dylan". They are known for their "buzzing guitars, powerful vocals, and a driving drum and bass section". The Irish Independent described the effect on the pulse of a combination of "urgent drums and guitars" alongside the "scattergun screech" of Sarah Jane Wai O'Flynn. SJ Wai counts her stylistic influences as including Debbie Harry of Blondie, describing her as "a true original who perfectly balanced a punk rock image with glamorous beauty".

== Career ==
=== Foundations ===
The band formed during their school days, when Wai, Farrell and Power first made collective use of their skills as musicians and songwriters. Delaney resided in a town "far far away" but met his three future bandmates and after which Dirty Epics were formed. New Yorker Vince Lim joined the band in late 2009 as guitarist. Darren McCoy joined then in late 2010 as guitarist. Darren, an old friend of the bands from Roundwood, County Wicklow.

Dirty Epics started writing and recording in 2005 where a demo of "The Cure" was reviewed in Hot Press by Jackie Hayden. They had their "Launch Gig" at Crawdaddy in April 2007. This was voted “Gig of the Week” by The Irish Times's weekly music supplement The Ticket. They have also supported The Rapture at Tripod in Dublin and performed with Republic of Loose in The Academy, as well as The Coronas at the same venue. In early 2009 the band embarked on a tour of the United States, performing in destinations such as New York City, Texas and Los Angeles. In a piece for independent.ie, the band perhaps jokingly said that they have used several cost-saving initiatives, including buying less batteries for their guitar effects pedals, less guitar strings and have also stated that they have restricted themselves to two strippers each per show.

=== Festival appearances ===
Dirty Epics performed as the second act (between myokhotel and The Milk Teeth) on the New Bands Tent at Oxegen on 7 July 2007. They returned the following year where they opened the Green Room Stage at 17:00 on 11 July 2008 just before The Kinetiks. Dirty Epics performed at Indie-pendence in August 2008. On 16 August 2008, the band played the Solas Stage at Solas Festival in County Carlow. They have also played Hard Working Class Heroes and Miss Ireland. They participated in the Arthur's Day events in Dublin on 24 September 2009 and in 2011 they played an open venue concert in Dublin to celebrate Chinese New Year.

On 19 March 2010, Dirty Epics performed at the Irish Breakfast Showcase held at SXSW. It was around this time that the single "I Heart You" was released and new guitarist Vince Lim joined the band. They returned to Dublin to support OneRepublic.

Dirty Epics performed at Guinness Arthur's Day 2010 in Whelans with Brandon Flowers and in The George Pub with the Hoosiers.

Dirty Epics also appeared at Electric Picnic in 2013, playing in the little big tent

=== Media appearances ===
On 29 March 2008, Dirty Epics appeared on The Once a Week Show alongside guests Leanne Moore, singer and Pamela Flood, model and television presenter. They performed "The Cure". On 30 October 2008 the band appeared on The Cafe alongside guests George Lee, economist and Lucy Kennedy, television presenter. They performed the song "Way Too Pretty". On 17 December the band performed at Whelan's as part of Alison Curtis's Christmas Special on Today FM. On Monday 9 February 2009 they performed on the podge and rodge show, taking part in their competition Rocin' Roulette. They also performed on UTV's Live at the Limelight on 25 February 2009. Dirty Epics also appeared on RTÉ Two's The Raw Sessions, progressing to the final with their song "All Time Favourite".

The song "We're Coming Up" featured in the final episode of the fourth series of British teen drama Skins on E4 on 18 March 2010.

== Members ==
SJ Wai - vocals
Darren McCoy - guitars
Richie Power - bass
Alan Delaney - drums

== Discography ==
Dirty Epics released the singles "The Cure" (released 7 March 2008) and "Way Too Pretty" (released 3 October 2008). They also garnered recognition through their songs "Overrated" and "Pony". Their debut album, Straight In No Kissing (produced by Dave Morgan and Gareth Mannix) was released on 31 October 2008.

They contributed to the 2009 charity album, Sparks n' Mind, released in aid of Aware, performing a cover version of the Portishead song, "Glory Box".

They also played at Presentation College, Terenure's Fashion Show and Design Competition in February 2009 for the Marie Keating Foundation for breast cancer.

=== Studio albums ===
Year	Album details	Peak chart positions	
Year	Album details	IRL	UK
2008	Straight In No Kissing: Released: 31 October 2008; Formats: CD, Digital Download	—	—
2013	One-Way Mirror: Released: 22 March 2013; Formats: CD, Digital Download	—	—
