= Indiependence =

Music festival in Ireland

Coordinates: 52.276607°N 8.264401°W

INDIEPENDENCE
- Indiependence Logo
- Genre: Indie Rock
- Dates: August Bank Holiday Weekend
- Locations: Mitchelstown, County Cork, Ireland
- Years active: 2006 to 2023
- Website: www.indiependencefestival.com

INDIEPENDENCE is a music festival which takes place on the outskirts of Mitchelstown in northern County Cork, Ireland, typically on the August Bank Holiday weekend. The festival typically features a variety of artists as well as comedy, spoken word, a small cinema and other attractions. INDIE, as it is known, has been shortlisted as one of the best small festivals in Europe several times, as well as winning awards within Ireland.

== Background ==
INDIEPENDENCE first started as a free festival in the town square in Mitchelstown, running as such in 2006, 2007 and 2008. Over these years, artists such as The Frank & Walters, Gemma Hayes, The Republic of Loose, The Sultans of Ping, Delorentos, Director and The Blizzards performed at the single-stage event. After capacity crowds in 2008, the festival moved to a green field site at O'Connell Park in 2009 and charged entry for the first time. This event featured The Super Furry Animals, Ocean Colour Scene, Villagers, The Blizzards and others. Despite poor weather, it was a success, and the festival moved to Deer Farm in 2010.

In 2025, the festival was again cancelled, having not run in 2020, 2021 or 2024. Although not ruling out a future return, festival promoter Shane Dunne said the fans would need to manage their expectations as he did not believe they could return to previous levels, such as in 2019 when the festival sold 15,000 tickets.

== Line-up headliners ==
=== 2006 ===
- The Sultans of Ping
- The Frank & Walters
- Fight Like Apes
- The Aftermath

=== 2007 ===
- Gemma Hayes
- Cathy Davey
- Republic of Loose

=== 2008 ===
- The Blizzards
- Director
- Delorentos
- Fight Like Apes
- Ham Sandwich

=== 2009 ===
- Ocean Colour Scene
- Super Furry Animals
- Mundy
- The Blizzards
- The Chapters
- Fight Like Apes
- Villagers

=== 2010 ===
- Alabama 3
- Reverend & The Makers
- White Lies
- The Coronas

=== 2011 ===
- Editors
- Ash
- Therapy
- The Coronas

=== 2012 ===
- 2manydjs
- The Coronas
- Feeder
- British Sea Power
- Maverick Sabre
- Beardyman
- Scroobius Pip
- Jape
- Japanese Popstars
- Delorentos

=== 2013 ===
- De La Soul
- Bell X1
- Bastille
- We Are Scientists
- Kodaline
- Ryan Sheridan
- Hudson Taylor
- The Fratellis
- Funeral for a Friend
- And So I Watch You From Afar
- Bosnian Rainbows

=== 2014 ===
- Public Enemy
- Tom Odell
- White Lies
- Hozier
- Dan le Sac vs Scroobius Pip
- Damien Dempsey
- David Holmes
- Delorentos
- Hudson Taylor
- The Minutes
- Walking on Cars
- The Sultans of Ping
- The Coronas

=== 2015 ===
- Kodaline
- Basement Jaxx
- The Dandy Warhols
- Ash
- Ham Sandwich
- Embrace
- Roisin O
- Hermitage Green
- The Academic
- Jape
- Mark Lanegan Band
- The Young Folk
- The Original Rudeboys

=== 2016 ===
- Bell X1
- Editors
- Ash
- The Kooks
- Walking on Cars

=== 2017 ===
- The Coronas
- Tom Odell
- Manic Street Preachers
- Wild Beasts

=== 2018 ===
- Walking on Cars
- Jake Bugg
- Primal Scream

=== 2019 ===
- Bastille
- Catfish and the Bottlemen
- Biffy Clyro

=== 2022 ===
- Fatboy Slim
- Bastille
- Rudimental

=== 2023 ===
- The Coronas
- Anne-Marie
- Two Door Cinema Club
