= Oxegen 2008 =

2008 music festival in Ireland

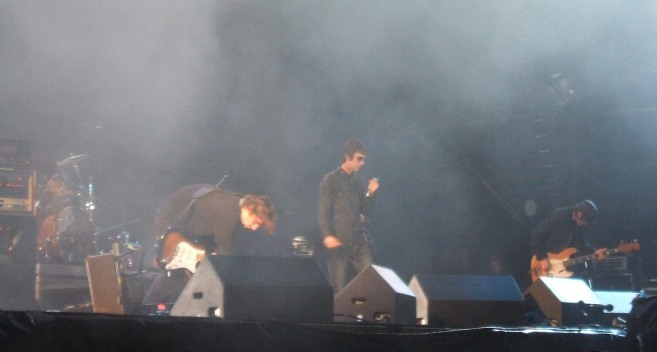
- The Verve headlining Oxegen '08
- Genre: Rock; Pop; Electronic and Dance
- Dates: 11 – 13 July 2008
- Locations: Punchestown Racecourse, County Kildare, Ireland
- Previous event: Oxegen 2007
- Next event: Oxegen 2009
- Website: oxegen.ie

Oxegen '08 was the fifth Oxegen festival to take place, following the dissolution of its predecessor Witnness in 2004. It took place on the weekend of Friday 11 July, Saturday 12 July and Sunday 13 July at Punchestown Racecourse near Naas in County Kildare, Ireland. For the first time the festival was a three-day event.

The festival was headlined by Kings of Leon on the Friday, The Verve and R.E.M. on the Saturday and Rage Against the Machine on the Sunday. The festival featured a lineup of over 250 acts across multiple stages, attracting approximately 80,000 attendees. Amy Winehouse performed for 70 minutes despite a recent 14-day stay in hospital and performed hits like Back to Black and Rehab, although her performance was widely debated. Rage Against the Machine concluded the festival, fighting through sound issues during their set.

The festival incorporated environmental initiatives, introducing reusable eco-cups and aiming for carbon neutrality in collaboration with The Carbon Neutral Company. However, the event also faced challenges, including a significant undercover drug operation resulting in numerous arrests and an incident involving a bus fire en route to the festival. Despite these issues, Oxegen 2008 earned accolades such as the Best European Festival at the UK Festival Awards

== Build-up ==
=== Tickets ===
Presale tickets went on sale at 8 a.m. on Friday 30 November 2007 at a cost of €197. Actual sale tickets went on sale at 8 a.m. on Friday 7 March 2008, with 4-day camping tickets priced at €244.50 and 3-day camping tickets priced at €224.50. Thursday camping passes cost €20 extra. Three-day weekend camping and four-day weekend camping tickets along with day tickets for Saturday 12 July were sold out by Monday 10 March 2008. A limited number of three-day (no camping) tickets and day tickets for Friday 11 July and Sunday 13 July were still available for a period after going sale, before the Oxegen website announced at 14:09 on Wednesday 7 May 2008 that all tickets were sold out. On Friday 13 June, in what they described as "a move to combat touting", MCD put a limited number of extra weekend tickets on sale for Oxegen 2008. The tickets were made available from the official website and Ticketmaster from Friday 20 June.

=== Line-up confirmation timetable ===
==== November ====
On 27 November 2007 at 17:00, Kings of Leon became the first band to be announced to play Oxegen. The band topped an online poll which asked festival-goers for their dream line-up and so the band were immediately asked and confirmed. Vocalist Caleb Followill said: "We love playing in Ireland, the fans are brilliant and we can't wait to play Oxegen 2008". They headlined the opening night (Friday) of the festival.

==== February ====
On 15 February 2008, R.E.M. were confirmed for Oxegen 2008, the second act to be announced and joining Kings of Leon. Meanwhile, Kaiser Chiefs confirmed themselves and Rage Against the Machine as Sunday night headliners on their official website; however this announcement was edited on 18 February to bear no mention of Rage Against the Machine who had yet to be officially confirmed. The words "directly before headliners Rage Against The Machine" were removed from the page. Tim Burgess also revealed that The Charlatans would be appearing although that too was hushed up soon afterwards. The Pogues too confirmed themselves online.

On 19 February at 16:29, Kaiser Chiefs, The Raconteurs and Ian Brown were announced on the official website, followed by The Fratellis, Interpol and Counting Crows the next day. 21 February saw Hot Chip, Justice, The Chemical Brothers, Aphex Twin and Alabama 3 added to the line-up. Finally, at 09:14 on 22 February, Rage Against the Machine were confirmed as headliners by the organisers. On Sunday 24 February, The Verve were confirmed on the official website for an appearance at Oxegen 2008. Stereophonics, Band of Horses, Seasick Steve, The Courteeners and Future Kings of Spain were all confirmed by the official website on 25 February, with official confirmation of The Prodigy, Panic! at the Disco, The Feeling, DJ Koze, Kaz James (BodyRockers) and Crookers on the following day.

==== March ====
The e-mail sent out with pre-sale ticket information to those registered on the official site confirmed that Bowling for Soup, Kate Nash, Editors, The Hoosiers, Newton Faulkner, Pendulum, Scouting for Girls, The Zutons, Battles, Róisín Murphy, Lightspeed Champion and David Jordan would also be playing. These twelve and Richard Hawley were confirmed by the official website on Monday 3 March. On Thursday 6 March, Tom Dunne's Pet Sounds show on Today FM broadcast an Oxegen Special previewing this year's line-up alongside festival highlights from previous years. Meanwhile, Hot Press was amongst the first news outlets to confirm that Amy Winehouse would again be scheduled to finally appear at Oxegen. Several bands and musicians such as Echo & the Bunnymen, The Wombats, The Pigeon Detectives, The Subways, Ben Folds, Delays, The Script, Kavinsky, Mindless Self Indulgence, and Boys Noize also confirmed themselves to play Oxegen '08 on their own websites before later being confirmed by the official Oxegen website.

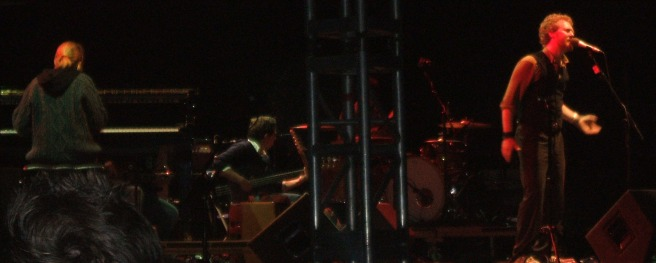
Markéta Irglová and Glen Hansard headlining Pet Sounds at Oxegen '08

On Wednesday 5 March in the late evening, the Oxegen website began a revamp for the release of the tickets on Friday 7 March. On Thursday 6 March, Oxegen 2008 was officially launched with the confirmation of appearances by Amy Winehouse, The Pogues, The Charlatans and The Swell Season, featuring Academy Award for Best Original Song winners Glen Hansard and Markéta Irglová. A breakdown of the acts was also revealed for the first time. A spokesman for promoters MCD said: "This year's line-up is one of the strongest ever. Music fans have quite literally the most diverse and strongest line-up of bands we have seen in Ireland. We are expecting tickets to sell very quickly." Glen Hansard told the Irish Daily Mirror: "I think Oxegen is just as exciting as appearing at the Oscars", saying "it's a dream come true for any Irish musician". The festival line-up was widely praised by the print media. The Irish Examiner called it a "fairytale line up for a festival", adding that "the fairytale of Naas will come alive this summer".

==== May ====
On Tuesday 6 May, Tom Dunne confirmed a host of other acts on his Pet Sounds show on Today FM. These included Manic Street Preachers, Feeder, Echo & the Bunnymen, The Ting Tings, Black Kids, MGMT, Bell X1, The Coronas, Concerto for Constantine and Delorentos. These and others including The Kooks and Groove Armada were confirmed by the Oxegen website the following day, along with details of the Dance Stage. The headliners were confirmed to be Unkle, Justice and David Guetta respectively for the three days. Also confirmed for the Dance Stage on the Friday were Calvin Harris and Annie Mac amongst others, for the Saturday were Boys Noize, Mylo, Kavinsky and The Japanese Popstars amongst others and for the Sunday were Luciano, Kaz James, Crookers and Does It Offend You, Yeah? amongst others. On Friday 16 May at 09:36, more acts were announced; these were The National, Tricky, The Go! Team, Feeder (again), The Pigeon Detectives, The Enemy, One Night Only and The Whigs.

==== June ====
On Monday 9 June at 11:00, forty new acts as well as the full stage line-up was announced on the official Oxegen website. New acts confirmed included Mundy, Aslan, Captain and Sugababes for the Friday and Eddy Grant, Flogging Molly and Fight Like Apes for the Sunday.

==== July ====
In early July, the showtimes for Oxegen 2008 were released. The line-up for the Bacardi B-Live Arena was also announced.

=== Cannabis controversy ===
On 27 February, there were calls from the Catholic anti-drugs agency, Crosscare, which runs counselling programmes in the Dublin Archdiocese for teenagers caught with weed at Oxegen not to be arrested. They claimed: "Our time is being wasted every year by mostly Leaving Cert students who don't have an addiction problem but have been arrested for a smoking a joint". Justice minister, Brian Lenihan rejected the proposal saying that it would amount to the legalisation of cannabis, of which Lenihan was severely intolerant.

=== Events ===
==== Platform III ====
Bands with Kildare connections were invited to compete in 2008's Platform III competition to win a slot on the Oxegen bill, in which two winning groups were selected to perform on the New Band Stage at Oxegen '08. Editors and The Killers have previously made their Oxegen debuts on that stage. Platform III Project Manager, Susan Boyle said that at least one band member should have Kildare connections. The winners were Kill City Defectors and Schmackey and the Salads.

==== Red Bull Local Hero Skate Tour ====
Red Bull Vert Ramp (in reality a skaterboarder's half-pipe) as seen at Oxegen '08

Four Irish bands playing at Oxegen '08 played free live outdoor performances as part of the Red Bull Local Hero Skate Tour. On Wednesday 18 June, Future Kings of Spain played in Waterford. On Thursday 19 June, The Kinetiks played in Ennis. On Friday 20 June, Concerto for Constantine played in Letterkenny and on Saturday 21 June, they played in Belfast. On Monday 23 June, The Coronas played in Dublin.

Local skaters were invited to skate with the Red Bull pro skate team who then selected the best skater from each venue crowning him or her the 'Red Bull Local Hero'. The 'Local Heroes' from each venue then attended the Red Bull Vert Ramp Camp at Oxegen where they received coaching from some of the world's top skaters including leading European Vert skater Mack McKelton from Germany and European Street Skating champion Philipp Schuster from Austria. The Local Hero's prize also included weekend festival passes to Oxegen '08.

Some of the world's best skaters were invited by Red Bull to perform a series of demonstrations throughout Oxegen '08. The riders performed on the Red Bull Vert Ramp (a skateboarder's Half-pipe) which has been used for professional Skateboarders in such events as X Games and the World Skateboarding Championships. This structure has proved daunting to the world's best riders standing 10m high, 15m wide and 14.2m in length, completely covered over with clear 'window' panels and open on both sides for public viewing.

=== Production ===
==== Riders ====
Parsnip crisps, onion rings, energy tablets and "organic ground coffee sourced in Dundalk" were just some of the whimsical desires of the world's biggest music acts, reported the Irish Independent. Organic foods were top of the menu including a selection of organic chocolates and smoked fish. Bands such as R.E.M., Kaiser Chiefs and Stereophonics were very precise in listing their requirements down to the finest detail, such as "Wrigley's Extra Blue Menthol eucalyptus chewing gum". Amy Winehouse's dressing room was stocked up with Kosher foods and crackers. Several acts asked for a steady flow of Red Bull and energy tablets. United States bands such as Rage Against the Machine and Interpol had a basket of American-style crisps "specifically New York Cheese flavour" taking up a corner of their changing area.

The VIP welcome area had an alpine theme with exotic plants, including very rare kangaroo paw plants as well as the exclusive Bluetooth cafe, Xbox area and Wi-Fi cafe. The luxurious dressing rooms were described as "comfortable and stylish with very ambient lighting and comfortable couches". The drinks cabinets contained a selection of world beers in the hope of having something to suit everybody's taste. However, some artists were a little bit pickier, ordering fine wines not by name, but by grape.

=== Publications ===
- Hot Press ran a special issue in the lead-up to Oxegen '08. It featured interviews with Kings of Leon, Interpol, Tricky, The Hold Steady, Vampire Weekend and The Ting Tings. Issues were available for sale at the Hot Press Signing Tent throughout the festival.
- On Friday 4 July, Day and Night (a supplement of the Irish Independent) ran a special issue, featuring a site map plus interviews with Groove Armada, White Denim, Echo & the Bunnymen and The Hold Steady. It also featured a run down of some of the lesser known acts such as Lightspeed Champion, Vampire Weekend, Yeasayer, Battles, Kavinsky and Noah and the Whale. An article on the Friday 11 July edition advised fans which other bands were similar in sound and style to Kings of Leon, Interpol, R.E.M., The Verve, Rage Against the Machine and The Chemical Brothers.
- On Monday 7 July, the Oxegen 08 Guide was published on the official website and made available for download.
- The Irish Daily Star has published two magazines. On Friday 11 July, a special edition of The Star includes a bumper 40-page The Scene Oxegen '08 special featuring interviews, celebrity tips, stage-by-stage features on the event, the ultimate festival survival guide and a full colour pull-out site map. On Monday 14 July, The Star' had a 16-page Oxegen '08 picture special.

=== Problems ===
- There was some difficulty selling all available tickets for Oxegen 2008 but they eventually sold out in May.
- Planners for Oxegen 2008 want to cut the parking facilities by one quarter, despite massive problems last year when a downpour saw the parking facilities shut and transferred to another area away from the site. Because an estimated 70% of emissions at Oxegen are associated with travel, festival goers were strongly urged to consider one of the public transport options to get to Punchestown for the festival. Bus Éireann ran express services from destinations around the country and Dublin Bus operated a shuttle service from Parnell Square. Car drivers were urged to use the Oxegen Park and Ride site, and take the free shuttle bus to Oxegen. Those wishing to drive were encouraged to car share and as an incentive a free parking ticket was provided when four camping tickets were presented at any Ticketmaster outlet.

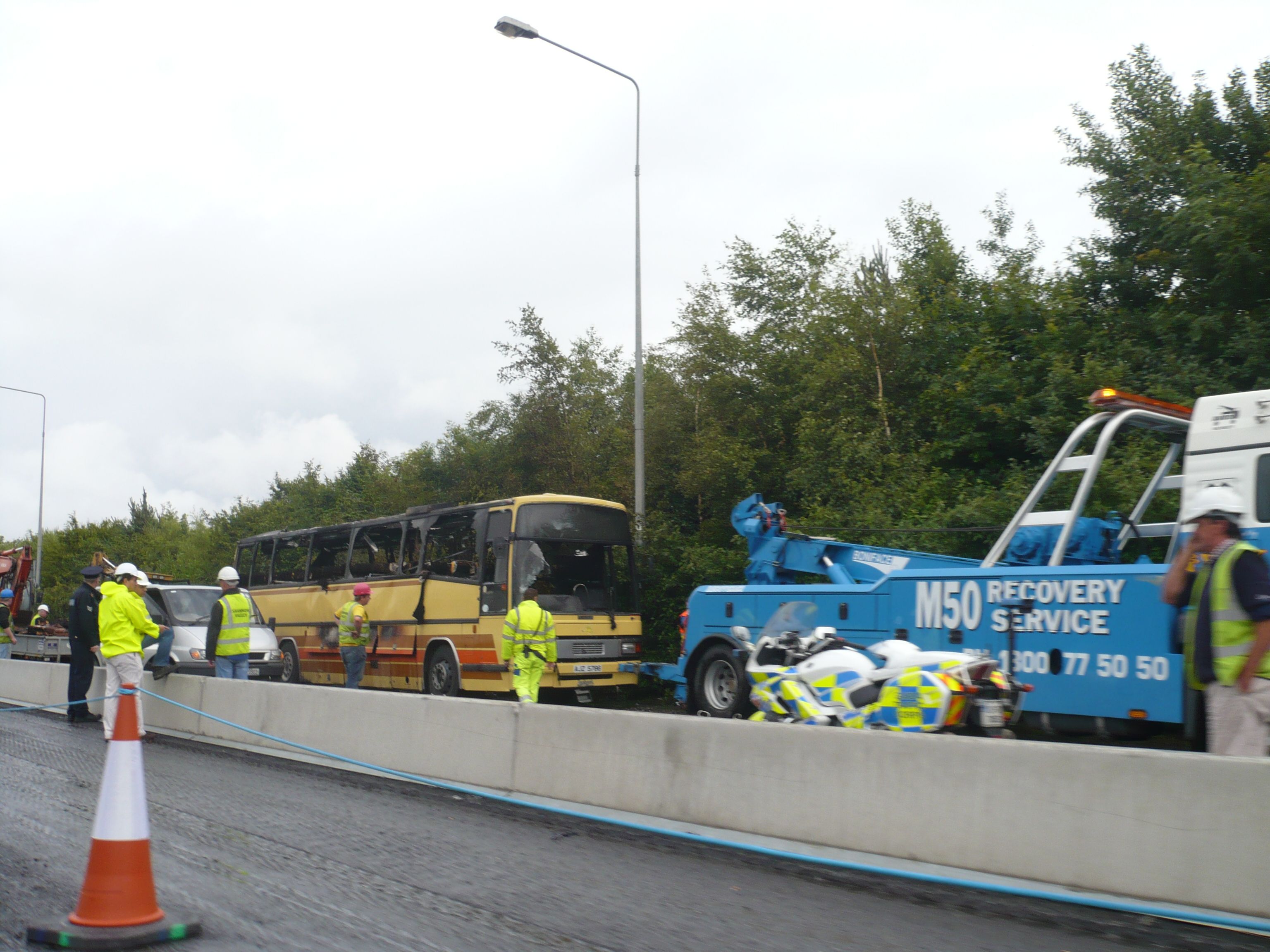
Burnt out bus on M50 – causing traffic jams

- On Thursday 10 July, a bus of forty festival-goers from Newry caught fire on a Dublin motorway en route to Oxegen. No one was seriously injured although food, clothes, tickets and camping equipment were burned in the blaze and the southbound lane of the M50 motorway had to be shut down with diversions put into place at Finglas and Ballymun, causing further traffic delays. Those involved in the incident arrived at Punchestown in time for kick off on Friday evening, with festival organisers MCD dispatching a new bus, replacing their tickets and camping equipment and supplying food vouchers.

== Festival ==
=== New additions ===
- Campers at Oxegen '08 were in for some environment-friendly changes to the year's sites and camping gear.
  - Oxegen '08 was awarded Carbon Neutral status, making it Ireland's biggest ever Carbon Neutral event. In keeping with World Environment Day (5 June), organisers announced that they have been working closely with The Carbon Neutral Company to look at ways to reduce carbon dioxide emissions produced from the festival.
  - The reusable Eco-cup was introduced to reduce the 10% of CO2 emissions attributed to waste that is unrecycled, i.e. landfill emissions. Festival-goers purchasing a drink at any of the bars could pay a €3 deposit for the Eco-cup for their first drink. When buying further drinks the customer exchanged their old cup for a new one at no extra cost and at the end of the night (from 10 p.m. onwards), they could either be exchanged for a full refund or taken home. Irish owned company Earthstream Bio Packaging also offered all Oxegen food vendors the opportunity to use bio-degradable packaging.
- The Hot Press Signing Tent made an appearance at Oxegen '08 and ran throughout the three days. On Friday, Tricky, Editors, Paddy Casey, Mundy and Interpol were amongst the artists who appeared. On the Saturday Feeder, The Hoosiers, The Wombats, Scouting for Girls, Justice, The Coronas and The Charlatans made appearances. On the Sunday, The Blizzards, Alabama 3 and Republic of Loose were present. Free gifts distributed to those in the queue included CDs, smoking papers, a competition to win 1000 CDs and three-month subscription cards to hotpress.com.
- The IMRO New Sounds Stage debuted at Oxegen '08, with Blood Red Shoes headlining on the Saturday night and Dry County headlining on the Sunday night.
- The Xbox Live Stage made its first ever European appearance at Oxegen '08. Boasting a massive 46 sq m, high-quality LED cinema screen, the Xbox Live Stage featured live performances and VJ sets from the likes of MTV's Eclectic Method. The Xbox Live Stage kicked off proceedings at 12 noon on Thursday, and ran from 10 am each day of the festival until late.
- An Post were present at Oxegen '08, allowing festival-goers the opportunity to mail home their passports and driving licences used for identification purposes upon entry. Festival-goers could also top up their mobile phones, post special commemorative Oxegen postcards and buy lottery tickets. Money could even also sent from home via Western Union.
- Stage 2/NME (formerly The NME Stage and previously The Ticket Stage) was renamed yet again and was, for the 2008 festival, known as the O2 Stage.

=== Weather ===
Weather conditions were considerably better than at the 2007 festival which was marred by mud and rain. Friday and Saturday were relatively cool whilst the warmest day was Sunday. The Blizzards frontman Niall Breslin, again performing on the Main Stage on the Sunday, noted the difference in the weather conditions from the previous year. In a change from 2007, grass was still visible by the end of the weekend.

=== Performances ===
The Zutons, on the O2 Stage, performed the original version of "Valerie" following Amy Winehouse's earlier effort at Oxegen '08.

Oxegen 2008 was notable for the number of covers performed by the participating artists. On the Friday, Amy Macdonald began proceedings with a cover of "When You Were Young" whilst The Saw Doctors performed "About You Now" as seen on The Podge and Rodge Show plus Beastie Boys song "(You Gotta) Fight for Your Right (To Party!)", Tricky performed "The Lovecats", Ben Folds performed a cover of The Postal Service's "Such Great Heights", Bell X1 closed their Green Room headlining set with a version of The Flaming Lips song "Do You Realize??" and Cat Power's performance included a version of Smokey Robinson's "The Tracks of My Tears". On Saturday, Bowling For Soup performed the intro to "Paranoid" and then merged it into "I Wanna Be Sedated" by The Ramones, Newton Faulkner performed covers of "Bohemian Rhapsody" and "You Spin Me Round (Like A Record)", Hot Chip performed a version of "Nothing Compares 2 U", Feeder did a verse of "Monkey Gone to Heaven" and "Best of You" whilst Manic Street Preachers performed Nirvana's "Pennyroyal Tea" and their cover of Rihanna's "Umbrella" which was reprised in the Green Room the following night when Ian Brown tested his microphone with a quick "Ella ella, eh eh eh". "Valerie" was performed twice on the Saturday, first on the Main Stage by Amy Winehouse and later, on the O2 Stage, the original version was performed by The Zutons. On the Sunday, The Feeling performed two covers – "Video Killed the Radio Star" and "Take On Me" – whilst The Blizzards performed a cover of "Black and Gold", Republic of Loose funkified Akon's "Locked Up" and The Raconteurs covered Jape's "Floating". The Hoosiers performed Billy Joel's "We Didn't Start the Fire".

==== Thursday ====
The Stone Roses Experience entertaining Thursday night campers, 9 July 2008

For the first ever Thursday night at Oxegen a number of entertainments were supplied. There was a circus, a silent disco, a banjo orchestra and a couple of tribute bands. The red camping site hosted the Swamp Circus Theatre. The Cloghoppers, the smallest banjo orchestra in the world, performed on unicycles, alongside the aerial artistry of Emily Rose. At the silent disco, dancers had a choice of two DJs on their FM headsets. Unfortunately, the silent disco was cancelled on Thursday night due to a small scale riot in which several festival goers were slightly injured due to being crushed against steel fencing surrounding the tent. The Rocking Back The Clock Stage featured tribute acts such as The Stone Roses Experience, and AC/DC cover band, Hells Bells.

==== Friday ====
"Guess Again" was the first song performed on the O2 Stage by Future Kings of Spain whilst Amy Macdonald opened the Main Stage. Making her Oxegen debut, she commented:

"It's really cool to open a festival because everyone is in such high spirits, but it's especially great to open this one. Us Scots and Irish are always in the mood to party."

The Kinetiks followed Dirty Epics onto the Green Room stage. Nominated for the "Hope For 2008" at the Meteor Awards, The Kinetiks said beforehand they relished the prospects of playing in front of their biggest audience to date. Lead singer Gaz Harding (23) said:

"We're not nervous, just looking forward to it. Obviously the tent is massive. We're going to go and do what we do and hope that everyone will be blown away and we can go out and have a great night afterwards."

Following an appearance on the New Band Stage on the Friday, Liam Finn uniquely performed again on the Saturday on the same stage as a last minute replacement for Ida Maria who cancelled her set due to illness.

Sugababes made an appearance on the O2 Stage following a much publicised last minute cancellation of an Irish show supporting Boyzone the previous week. They entered the stage to Rihanna's "Don't Stop the Music", opening with "Hole in the Head" and continuing with the likes of "Round Round", "Freak like Me" and "Push the Button". At one point there was some sound difficulty and the show had to be stopped until one of the Sugababes was handed a replacement microphone by someone called Darren from backstage whose name the audience repeatedly chanted for a period.

Editors appeared on the Main Stage on Friday evening.

Editors made their fourth consecutive appearance at Oxegen on the Friday evening. Following stints on the New Band Stage, NME Stage and Green Room they this year appeared on the Main Stage. Opening with "Bones" – a song first performed at Oxegen in 2006 – the band's set also included "An End Has a Start", "Escape the Nest", "The Racing Rats", "All Sparks", "Bullets", "Blood", "Munich", "Fingers in the Factories" and "Smokers Outside the Hospital Doors".

Interpol, having previously second headlined the Green Room at Oxegen 2005 and second headlined Stage 2/NME at Oxegen 2007, second headlined the Main Stage on the Friday night of Oxegen 2008.

==== Saturday ====
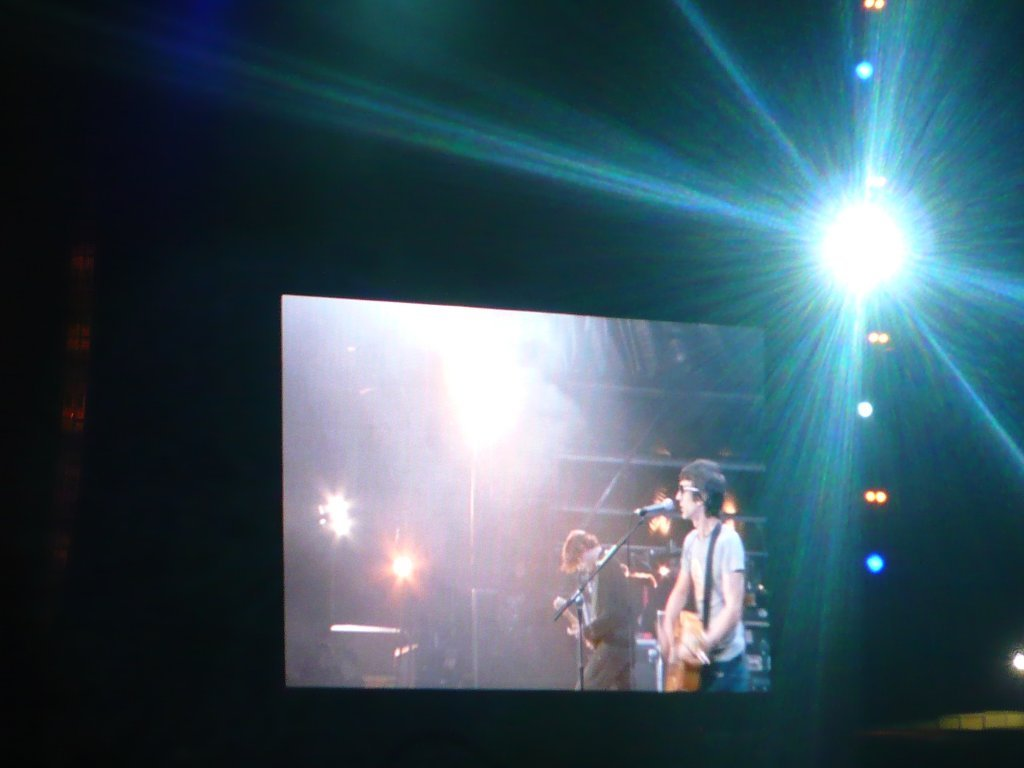
The Verve performing on the Main Stage on Saturday, 12 July 2008.

The Verve headlined the Main Stage on the Saturday night, opening with "This Is Music" and completing their set with "The Drugs Don't Work", "Lucky Man", "Bitter Sweet Symphony" and "Love Is Noise". Richard Ashcroft referred to the area's main use as a racecourse when he informed the crowd:

"The dressing rooms are dead good, they've got pictures of the jockeys and the champions on the walls [the site is usually a racecourse]. The funny thing is all the trainers have got all the same name over here. I guess if you've got the look... Anyway this if for Tony Soprano, Tony Montana and all 'The Rolling People'."

He then politicised "Bitter Sweet Symphony" by criticizing the United Nations – "Shame on the United Nations, shame on the United Nations, the people of Zimbabwe need you" – and dedicating it to Zimbabwe and all the slaves (including Cristiano Ronaldo who was only earning £120,000 per week). Days later, Ashcroft was struck down by severe pharyngitis and a chest infection, forcing the band to cancel another festival appearance at the Italia Wave Festival in Livorno. At the end of The Verve's set at Oxegen, The Prodigy were still performing over on the O2 Stage whilst Manic Street Preachers had just finished headlining the Green Room. They opened with "Motorcycle Emptiness" and "You Stole the Sun from My Heart" and ended with "If You Tolerate This Your Children Will Be Next" in a set which also included "The Masses Against The Classes", "Autumnsong", "Your Love Alone Is Not Enough" and "Nicky Wire's favourite pop song of 2007", "Umbrella". A Welsh flag was draped across the stage throughout their set. "A Design for Life" was introduced with the following statement from frontman James Dean Bradfield:

"How many drinking songs do you think we have here? One, two, four or five? Well, give me a fiver and I'll buy you a drink. This is a Welsh international drinking song".

Michael Stipe of R.E.M. on the Main Stage at Oxegen '08

R.E.M. played a crowd-pleasing marathon set of 21 songs on the Main Stage, including favourites "Orange Crush", "The One I Love", "What's the Frequency, Kenneth?", "Bad Day", "Imitation of Life", "Losing My Religion", "Man-Sized Wreath", "Hollow Man" (before which the sharply suited Michael Stipe alluded to the song's first live performance at the Olympia Theatre, Dublin) and encore songs, "Supernatural Superserious", "It's the End of the World as We Know It (And I Feel Fine)" and "Man on the Moon". Throughout their set a wall of Warholian images were displayed in the background and on the big screens on either side of the stage.

Amy Winehouse on the Main Stage at Oxegen '08.

Amy Winehouse took to the Main Stage before 7 pm just two hours after flying in by private plane. She swigged from a glass of vodka and coke whilst she sang along to anthems including "Back to Black" before finishing her set with "Rehab" and "Valerie". A backstage source revealed:

"Amy was looking very frail but she was determined to have a couple of drinks even if it was against doctors' orders. She came in and left straight after the gig and caused very little fuss."

Winehouse gave a taste of her new material, which carried obvious Caribbean influences, supported by her choice of a tropical-printed mini-dress. Despite fumbling over the words to "You Know I'm No Good", a happy-looking Amy performed an upbeat set of crowd-pleasers, enhanced by her energetic backing singers. Speaking only to introduce the band and to dedicate a song to her husband Blake, Winehouse appeared well and in good spirits. She was paid nearly €100,000 for her 70-minute performance. Medical staff had been ordered to be on standby at the stage over fears that she could collapse after her recent 14-day stint in hospital.

Little Man Tate were forced to cancel their appearances at T in the Park and Oxegen 2008 after a night out in Brighton on the previous Wednesday left singer Jon Windle with a broken jaw. The quartet were celebrating signing to local label Skint Records when in an unprovoked attack Windle was set upon by a group of thugs. They were due to open the 02 Stage on the Saturday. Also cancelling on the Saturday was Ida Maria who was due to make her Irish debut appearance on the New Bands Stage but was unable to perform due to an "acute lymph infection". She was replaced on the bill by Liam Finn, the eldest son of Crowded House frontman Neil Finn, who performed a second set on the same stage.

In the Green Room, The Ting Tings second ever Irish appearance was timed with a downturn in the weather, with heavy rain prompting a large crowd into the marquee to witness a set that opened with "Great DJ" and closed with "Shut Up and Let Me Go" and "That's Not My Name". Gardaí closed off all entrances to stem the huge crowd, although the situation was not quite as serious as at MGMT in the Pet Sounds tent the following day.

Camille O'Sullivan arrived on the Pet Sounds Stage in a kimono and a trilby and stripped down to a dress and Wizard of Oz style sequined stilettos for "In These Shoes", which she performed in an array of pin-up poses. She miaowed and purred her way through the set, crawling onto the speaker to fondle security. A burlesque show, Camille ended up stripping down to just a corset and fishnets teamed with a pair of wellies. Her band, complete with a mini brass section, were the accompaniment to the singer, following her lead throughout. In a final number, she cocked her tail and flaunted her curves, winking at lucky audience members and ignoring the "get them off you"s from one eager gentleman in the crowd. She gave a final thank you to her band, before leaving while clutching a bottle of wine in one hand and her dress in the other.

Seasick Steve told the crowd at the Pet Sounds Stage:

"Man I like coming up here – y'all special. Ireland got me started when I thought I was all done. God damn you rock – y'all gold."

Following a session with his Three Stringed Tranz Wonder he moved onto his one-string Diddley bow. During "Thunderbird" he selected a rain-soaked poncho-clad female member of the audience, brought her up on stage, put her on a chair and dedicated the song to her and all the women in the audience. He then embraced her at the end.

==== Sunday ====
Rage Against the Machine headlined the Oxegen '08 Main Stage.

Rage Against the Machine were the Sunday night headliners on the Main Stage. The band, who arrived onstage 15 minutes late, sparked mass mosh pits in the crowd as they blasted through their back catalogue. Frontman Zack de la Rocha greeted the crowd with: "Good evening. We are Rage Against The Machine from Los Angeles." Despite the sound cutting out briefly on a number of occasions, the band drew huge cheers for the likes of "Bombtrack" and "Bullet in the Head" as De La Rocha strutted across the stage and guitarist Tom Morello riffed through a number of tracks. Unlike their T in the Park performance the previous night, the band said very little throughout their performance. Rage wrapped up their show with a two-song encore that ended at approximately midnight with "Freedom" leading into their biggest hit "Killing in the Name".

Ricky Wilson of Kaiser Chiefs on the Main Stage at Oxegen '08

Earlier Kaiser Chiefs took to the Main Stage with frontman Ricky Wilson diving head-first into the crowd before his band had played a single note. He reminded the crowd that Rage Against the Machine would follow them, saying that they would play "Killing in the Name" last. Wilson then delivered a raucous performance by climbing the stage rigging, repeatedly diving into the crowd during the first songs before later running around the security area behind the mosh pit and leaning into the crowd. Kaiser Chiefs opened their set with "Everything Is Average Nowadays", "Everyday I Love You Less and Less" and "Heat Dies Down", ending with "Oh My God". Three new songs – "Never Miss A Beat", "You Want History" and "Half The Truth" were also performed live. The Blizzards frontman Niall Breslin also referenced Rage by announcing to the Main Stage crowd that they would be "reliving our youth tonight" when they would be in the mosh pit with the crowd for the band's performance. They thanked fans for the Meteor Award they won for their previous year's performance at Punchestown and performed a cover of the Sam Sparro song "Black and Gold". Later The Kooks frontman Luke Pritchard was embarrassed after having his trousers pulled down as he disappeared into the crowd during the band's final song. The crowd laughed as his rear end was displayed on the large screens by the Main Stage and Pritchard exited the stage with an expression of irritation on his face.

The Pigeon Detectives on the O2 Stage at Oxegen '08

The Feeling were second on the Main Stage and played up their roots with frontman Dan Gillespie Sells referring to his Irish mother who could not be there to witness his performance unlike in 2006, telling the crowd he used to go to Féile as a boy and at one point saying the Irish drinking phrase "Sláinte" to the bemused crowd who witnessed covers of "Video Killed the Radio Star" and "Take On Me". The band opened with "I Thought It Was Over" and "Fill My Little World" and ended with "Love It When You Call" in a set that included "Never Be Lonely", "Turn It Up", "Join With Us" and "Sewn". Eddy Grant opened the Main Stage with his song "Killer on the Rampage" and caused consternation amongst crowd members by repeatedly saying he was in Dublin until one crowd member yelled, "You're not in Dublin" to laughter from the stewards and surrounding festival-goers.

On the O2 Stage, The Pigeon Detectives frontman Matt Bowman engaged in some raucous antics with the crowd, pouring bottles of water over himself throughout the band's energetic performance and throwing them into the crowd still half full. At one point he climbed onto a pile of five amps before diving back down onto the stage and apologised for the band having to cancel a performance at Bud Rising in April due to a broken wrist sustained performing a similar stunt. The band opened with "This Is An Emergency" and finished their high octane set with "Take Her Back" and "I'm Not Sorry".

Republic of Loose brought Styles P to Oxegen to assist in their set on the O2 Stage whilst Isobel Reyes-Feeney was also present to provide vocals for "The Steady Song" and "Break". Frontman Mick Pyro informed the crowd about having the flu and asked the audience to sing along to "Comeback Girl". The Chemical Brothers headlined the O2 Stage beginning with "Galvanize". Before the band took to the O2 Stage there was an onstage marriage proposal, with Belfast girl Michaela Murphy (23) popping the question to her boyfriend Paddy McBride (27) after arriving on stage on a motorbike. Paddy said "Yes". The engagement saw Michaela present Paddy with a bass guitar and a plectrum instead of a wedding ring. It was arranged by Franc of Weddings by Franc from BBC Television who will include Michaela and Paul in his new BBC series.

Kate Nash on the O2 Stage at Oxegen '08

Kate Nash closed her mermaid-themed set with "Foundations" and squeaked as she was bombarded with fruit when she sang the line: "You said I must eat so many lemons...". The Subways made their Oxegen debut by opening the O2 Stage on the Sunday afternoon and delivered a powerful set which ended with a bare-chested Billy Lunn screeching the lyrics to "Rock & Roll Queen".

Meanwhile, at the Pet Sounds Stage thousands packed into the marquee to witness MGMT's set, with many more queueing outside. Extra stewards had to be called in to deal with the sudden crowd surge and many trying to escape the heat inside the tent found themselves trapped by the crowds and security cordons. MGMT finished with the track "Kids" after a twenty-minute delay midset following one errant female punter's decision to scale all 20–25 feet of one of the tent's lattice support towers after "4th Dimensional Transition". This triggered a spate of copycat climbing, with the band continuing performing "Pieces of What" until security had to shut down the show. In the midst of the commotion, frontman Andrew VanWyngarden was heard to say: "I guess they're gonna stop the show unless you guys get down, I'm sorry" to widespread booing from audience members.

Fight Like Apes on the 2FM Stage at Oxegen '08

Ian Brown brought the Green Room to a close with "F.E.A.R.". Taking to the stage with a lone trumpeter playing The Godfather theme, Brown treated the crowd to a version of The Stone Roses song "Waterfall". He asked the crowd: "You been drinking a lot?" to loud cheers before he tested his microphone with a verse of Rihanna's "Umbrella" a cappella.

Tom Baxter spent the weekend trying to avoid his idol Shane MacGowan, this despite the British folk singer performing in the Green Room just before MacGowan's band The Pogues, performing at their first Irish festival since Féile in 1991. Bypassing the opportunity of meeting MacGowan up close and personal, the singer of chart hit "Better" opted to mingle among the crowds. Baxter told the Herald:

"I haven't met them (The Pogues) before but I don't like to meet people like that. I don't know whether meeting your idols actually enlightens you that much. I just bought their album Rum Sodomy & the Lash because I'd lost it years ago. I've been listening to that so I've really wanted to go see them live. I never think it's worth meeting these people. I've met a few of my idols and I never know what to say to them."

=== VIP guests ===
Notable attendees at Oxegen 2008 included singer Lily Allen, The Chemical Brothers' Ed Simons, Neil Hannon of Divine Comedy, Communications Minister Eamon Ryan, supermodel Helena Christensen, Interpol lead singer Paul Banks, Rolling Stones guitarist Ronnie Wood, Chris Pontius of Jackass, musician Newton Faulkner, Reverend and The Makers frontman Jon McClure, Henry Mountcharles and his wife Iona, Miss World 2003 Rosanna Davison and Wesley Quirke. Media personalities such as RTÉ's Pat Kenny, Rick O'Shea and Jenny Huston were also present.

=== Safe sex ===
The Crisis Pregnancy Agency was at Punchestown to distribute safe sex packs. The group's Caroline Spillane said they were handing out safe sex tins providing information and a condom, "So people will have information about practising safe sex, but also they will have a condom if they choose to have sex."

=== Crime ===
Over two hundred gardaí were on duty daily at the 2008 festival, according to the Garda Press Office.

- Gardaí carried out a major undercover drugs operation at Oxegen 2008, arresting hundreds of attendees and fifty suspected drug dealers. The operation had been planned for months and focused on disrupting organised dealing activity. Arrested individuals were taken to Naas Garda Station; those found in possession were cautioned.
- On Friday 11 July, a juvenile male festival worker was arrested in connection with an alleged sexual assault in the staff camping area. He was later released without charge. The alleged victim was treated at the Rotunda Hospital in Dublin.
- Gardaí also investigated a second reported sexual assault on the Friday night, alleged to have occurred in one of the campsites. The Union of Students in Ireland issued a warning after date rape drugs were reported stolen from a Dublin pharmacy, urging caution among festival attendees.
- A female attendee sustained first-degree burns on the Friday night after being accidentally injured with a makeshift blow torch. She was treated at Naas General Hospital and later discharged. Gardaí launched an investigation into the incident.

== Aftermath ==
=== Reaction ===
The Belfast Telegraph described Oxegen 2008 as "a huge success, with no repeat of the mud-bath that marked last year's event". The Japanese Popstars remixed The Ting Tings's music following a backstage meeting at the event.

=== Publications ===
Hot Press published a special issue reviewing Oxegen which was made available from Thursday 17 July.

=== Returning bands ===
Within a week of playing sets at Oxegen 2008, a number of international bands announced they would be returning to play other Irish shows before the end of the year.

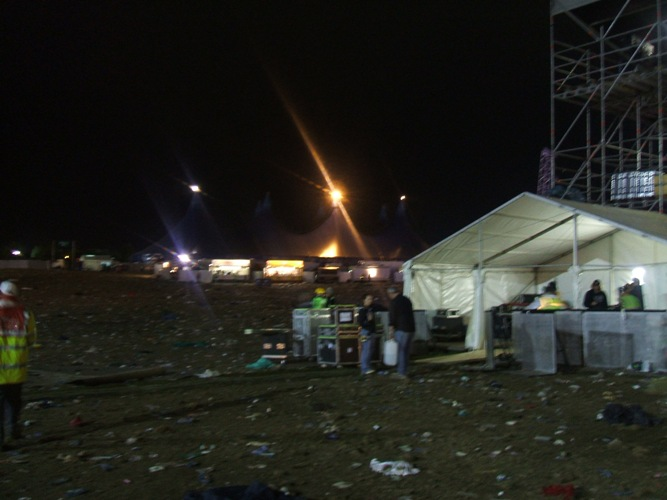
The end of Oxegen '08 (Background: Pet Sounds)

On 14 July, MGMT announced a 3 November date at the Ambassador Theatre which had sold out by 18 July. Also on 14 July, Black Kids announced two Irish dates in – 20 October October in Mandela Hall and 21 October in The Academy. On 16 July, Scouting for Girls announced a 14 December date in the Ambassador Theatre. On 17 July, Flogging Molly announced a 7 November date at the Ambassador as part of the Eastpak Antidote Tour 2008.

=== Thanks ===
On Friday 18 July, the official Oxegen website issued "A BIG THANK YOU!", thanking fans for making 2008 the greenest Oxegen yet, with 70% using public transport and the amount of waste being dramatically reduced by the Oxegen Eco Cup.

== Awards ==
In late 2008, Oxegen '08 won the Best European Festival at the UK Festival Awards which was voted for by members of the public from across Europe and the "Yourope Award for Best European Festival", the first Irish festival to receive this award and one of only 18 worldwide.

Republic of Loose's set was named third best gig of 2008 by RTÉ. Other honourable mentions went to Scouting for Girls, Róisín Murphy and R.E.M.

And, for the second consecutive year, The Blizzards's Sunday Main Stage performance was nominated for Best Irish Live Performance at the 2009 Meteor Awards. They won this award for the second consecutive year at the ceremony on 17 March 2009.

== Broadcasting rights ==
MTV was the official live broadcast partner for Oxegen '08. MTV's coverage of Oxegen '08 premiered with the OXEGEN Festival Weekend on 2 August – 3 with over fifty hours of programming across MTV's portfolio of channels, including MTV Two, VH1, MTV Hits, MTV One and TMF as well as support from http://www.mtv.co.uk .

2fm and 2XM broadcast over fifty hours of music during the three days of the festival. Jenny Huston, Jenny Greene, Cormac Battle, Dan Hegarty, Dave Fanning and Mr Spring presented radio coverage of the event. RTÉ 2xm WebTV also made a debut at Oxegen.

Other broadcasters present at Punchestown included SPIN 1038, FM104 and Phantom (now TXFM).

== Stages ==
Oxegen 2008 had at least eight stages. These included the Main Stage, the 02 Stage, the Pet Sounds Arena, the Green Room, the Dance Arena, the New Bands/Futures Stage, the Bacardi B-Live Arena and one new addition, the IMRO New Sounds Stage.

- The Main Stage was headlined by Kings of Leon, The Verve/R.E.M. and Rage Against the Machine.
- The O2 Stage was headlined by Groove Armada, The Prodigy and The Chemical Brothers.
- The Pet Sounds Arena was headlined by Cat Power, The National and The Swell Season – featuring Glen Hansard and Markéta Irglová.
- The Green Room was headlined by Bell X1, Manic Street Preachers and Ian Brown.
- The Dance Arena was headlined by Calvin Harris, Justice and David Guetta.
- The New Bands/Futures Stage was headlined by White Denim, Elliot Minor and Los Campesinos!.
- The IMRO New Sounds Stage was headlined by Blood Red Shoes and Dry County.

=== 2008 Line-up ===
The acts that played the festival:

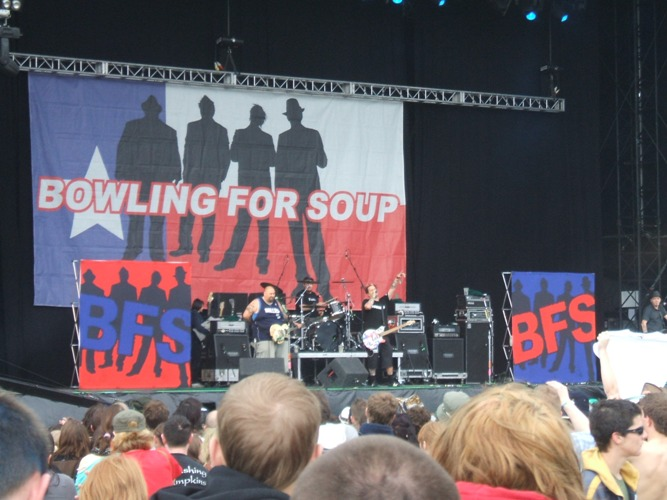
Bowling for Soup opened the Main Stage on the Saturday of Oxegen '08.

The Raconteurs on the O2 Stage at Oxegen '08

Friday 11 July	Saturday 12 July	Sunday 13 July
Main Stage: Kings of Leon; Interpol; Editors; Paddy Casey; The Coronas; Amy Macdonald	Main Stage: The Verve; R.E.M.; Stereophonics; Amy Winehouse; Counting Crows; Newton Faulkner; Scouting for Girls; Bowling for Soup	Main Stage: Rage Against the Machine; Kaiser Chiefs; The Fratellis; The Kooks; The Blizzards; The Feeling; Eddy Grant

Friday 11 July	Saturday 12 July	Sunday 13 July
The O2 Stage: Groove Armada; The Go! Team; Ben Folds; dEUS; Sugababes; Future Kings of Spain	The O2 Stage: The Prodigy; The Zutons; Feeder; Panic! at the Disco; The Enemy; The Hoosiers; The Wombats; Powderfinger; One Night Only; ~~Little Man Tate~~*	The O2 Stage: The Chemical Brothers; The Raconteurs^{feat. Styles P}^{Isobel Reyes-Feeney}: Kate Nash; The Pigeon Detectives; We Are Scientists; The Courteeners; The Subways

_{* cancelled due to a broken jaw}

Ian Brown headlining the Green Room at Oxegen '08

Friday 11 July	Saturday 12 July	Sunday 13 July
Green Room: Bell X1; Mundy^{feat. Sharon Shannon}: Aslan; The Saw Doctors; The Kinetiks; Dirty Epics	Green Room: Manic Street Preachers; The Charlatans; Pendulum; Echo & the Bunnymen; Vampire Weekend; British Sea Power; The Ting Tings; The Brian Jonestown Massacre; Delays; Concerto for Constantine	Green Room: Ian Brown; The Pogues; Tom Baxter; Reverend and The Makers; Jack Peñate; Alabama 3; The Stranglers; The Hold Steady; The Whigs

Friday 11 July	Saturday 12 July	Sunday 13 July
Pet Sounds: Cat Power; Aphex Twin; Tricky; Battles; God Is an Astronaut	Pet Sounds: The National; Hot Chip; Richard Hawley; Seasick Steve; Declan O'Rourke; Paul Heaton; My Morning Jacket; The Music; Camille O'Sullivan; Jack McManus	Pet Sounds: Glen Hansard & Markéta Irglová; Róisín Murphy; Band of Horses; MGMT; Delorentos; Lightspeed Champion; David Jordan; Ryan Bingham

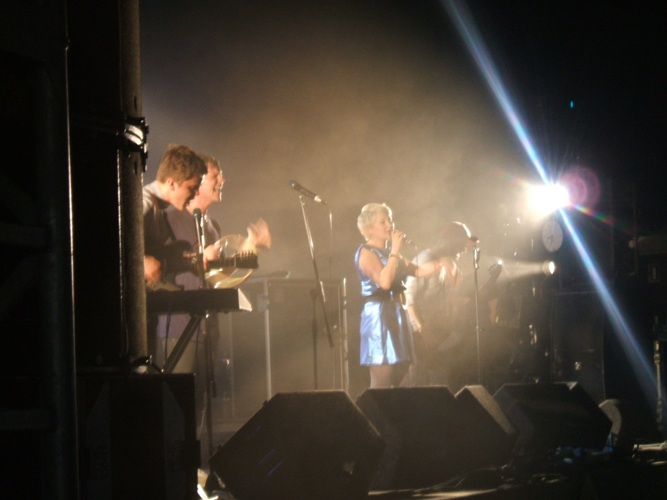
Alphabeat in the New Bands Tent at Oxegen '08

Fight Like Apes in the New Bands Tent at Oxegen '08

Friday 11 July	Saturday 12 July	Sunday 13 July
Dance Arena: Calvin Harris; Unkle; Annie Mac; MSTRKRFT; DJ Koze; Kosheen; Burns	Dance Arena: Justice; Boys Noize; Mylo; Slam; Michael Mayer; Kavinsky; The Japanese Popstars; Chemistry DJs	Dance Arena: David Guetta; Luciano; Kaz James; Crookers; Radioslave; Quiet Village; Does It Offend You, Yeah?; Carl Craig

Friday 11 July	Saturday 12 July	Sunday 13 July
New Band Stage/Futures: White Denim; Friendly Fires; The Metros; Noah and the Whale; Sparkadia; Bryn Christopher; Liam Finn; Leopold	New Band Stage/Futures: Elliot Minor; Royworld; Joe Lean & The Jing Jang Jong; Black Kids; Alphabeat; ~~Ida Maria~~*; Yeasayer; Holy Fuck; Mindless Self Indulgence; Sergeant; Offshore; Kill City Defectors	New Band Stage/Futures: Los Campesinos!; Cajun Dance Party; Flogging Molly; Fight Like Apes; Glasvegas; The Script; Twisted Wheel; In Case of Fire; Jaguar Love; White Lies; Schmackey and the Salads

_{* cancelled due to "acute lymph infection" and replaced with Liam Finn}

The stage entrance to the IMRO New Sounds Stage at Oxegen '08

Saturday 12 July	Sunday 13 July
IMRO New Sounds Stage: Blood Red Shoes; Codes; Gary Go; Oppenheimer; Sons of Albion; New Amusement; Golden Silvers; The Cades; The Red Labels; Future Chaser	IMRO New Sounds Stage: Dry County; Team Waterpolo; Halves; Crayonsmith; The Rocket Summer; Brothers Movement; The Hazy Janes; Fighting with Wire; Arno Carstens; The Television Room

Friday 11 July	Saturday 12 July	Sunday 13 July
Bacardi B-Live Arena: DJ Askillz; Mikki Dee; Shortie	Bacardi B-Live Arena: Rob Wilder; La Bamba Sound System; Beardyman; Cian Ó'Cíobháin; A$$Quake; Chewy	Bacardi B-Live Arena: Secret Sundaze; Spontaneous Construction; Ben Westbeech; Tu-Ki; Kormac

Preceded by Oxegen '07	Oxegen '08	Succeeded by Oxegen '09
