= Bounce at the Devil =

Republic of Loose album

Studio album by Republic of Loose
- Released: October 8, 2010
- Studio: Wrightway Studios in Baltimore; Mule Studios in Dublin
- Label: Fish don't fear nets records

Republic of Loose chronology
Vol IV: Johnny Pyro and the Dance of Evil (2008)	Bounce at the Devil (2010)

Bounce at the Devil (or volume 5 Johnny Defeats Satan) is the fourth studio album by Dublin band Republic of Loose. It was released on October 8, 2010, on Fish don't fear nets records. It was recorded at Wrightway Studios in Baltimore, Maryland, and the additional recordings were done at Mule Studios, Dublin. The album received critical acclaim. They also received an IMRO award for Bounce at the Devil going to number one in the Irish Independent Chart. The album peaked at number 10 in the Irish music charts. Bo Starks made an appearance on the song "99". "The Man", "99" and "The Blah Bounce" were released as singles.

== Track listing ==
1. The Lamp
2. I Love the Police
3. How Is Your Brain?
4. Is This Not What You Wanted?
5. Ded Prostitutes
6. My Heroez
7. The Blah Bounce
8. Satan Bounce (Waltz with Satan and the Mechanical Prostitute)
9. She's So Evil
10. Mezmefried
11. Golf With Satan
12. 99 (featuring Bo Starks)
13. The Man
14. Deludable
15. What Kinda Man Would I Be?
