= This Is the Tomb of the Juice =

This is the Tomb of The Juice

Studio album by Republic of Loose
- Released: June 21, 2004
- Recorded: Apollo Studios, Dublin; Grouse Lodge, Co. Westmeath
- Genre: Rock
- Length: 61:32
- Label: Big Cat Records (UK)
- Producer: Johnny Pyro, Paul Thomas, Gareth Mannix

Republic of Loose chronology
This is the Tomb of The Juice (2004)	Aaagh! (2006)

This is the Tomb of the Juice is the debut album of Irish funk-rock band Republic of Loose; it was released in June 2004. The album contains three singles; "Girl I'm Gonna Fuck You Up", "Hold Up" and "Tell More Lies".

== Track listing ==
1. "Intro" - 0.35
2. "Kiodin Man" - 3.53
3. "Hold Up!" - 4.07
4. "Girl I'm Gonna Fuck You Up" - 5.44
5. "Goofy Love" - 4.35
6. "Something in the Water" - 3.07
7. "Tell More Lies" - 4.24
8. "Slow Down" - 6.57
9. "Sweet Cola of Mercy" - 4.35
10. "Six Sober Sounds" - 4.32
11. "Fuck Everybody" - 2.10
12. "Ride with Us" - 4.17
13. "Dial Jesus for Sweetness" - 3.42
14. "Black Bread" - 4.07
15. "Lawn Child" - 4.57
