= Oxegen 2009 =

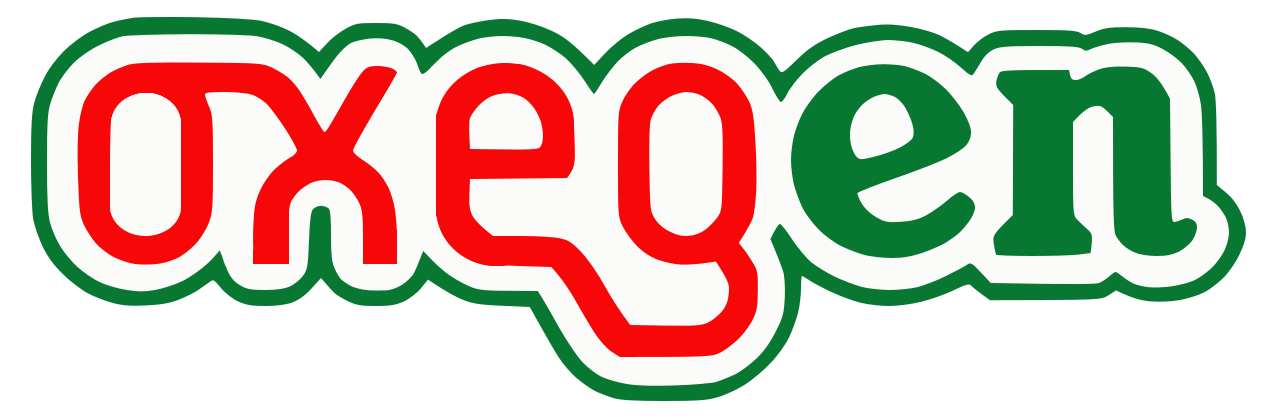

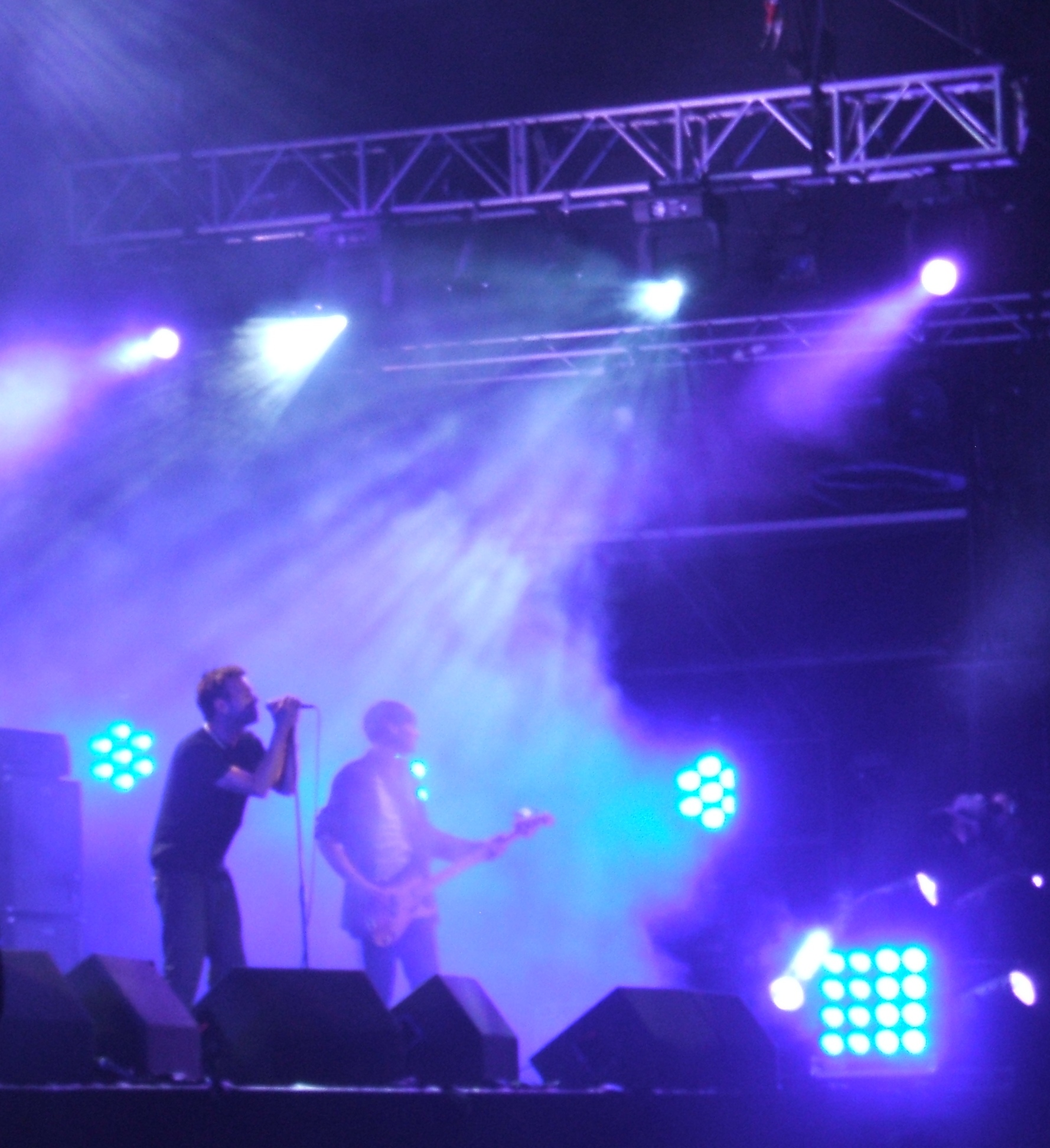
- Blur's Damon Albarn and Alex James on stage as the band headline Oxegen '09.
- Genre: Rock
- Dates: 9–12 July 2009
- Locations: Punchestown Racecourse, County Kildare, Ireland
- Previous event: Oxegen 2008
- Next event: Oxegen 2010
- Website: www.OXEGEN.ie

Oxegen 2009 was the sixth Oxegen festival to take place since 2004. It took place on the weekend of Friday 10 July, Saturday, 11 July and Sunday, 12 July at Punchestown Racecourse near Naas in County Kildare, Ireland. Kings of Leon, Snow Patrol, Blur and The Killers headlined.

The festival took place over three days, with reports of a four-day festival proving unconfirmed as did rumours, described as "ridiculous", that a 6 pm curfew would be imposed on the Sunday.

The festival slot was the only Irish performance by Kings of Leon in 2009. It also featured the only Irish live performance of Blur in 2009. The Killers were voted most popular band in an official poll conducted on the Oxegen website after the event. The band later used footage from the festival on their live DVD Live from the Royal Albert Hall, released on 6 November that year. Oxegen 2009 was officially opened by the Artane Band on 10 July at 14:00. The festival was heralded as "a marvel of organisation" when compared to the Woodstock Festival held in the United States in 1969.

Oxegen 2009 was also the first European music festival to have an X-ray machine onsite. It was also praised for its greenness and recognised as the largest 100% CarbonNeutral event in Ireland.

== Build-up ==
=== Tickets ===
Tickets for the festival were on offer as prizes to those who filled in an online survey won by Kings of Leon, the first headliner announced for the second consecutive year on 28 January 2009. A similar survey led to them being booked for the 2008 festival. Early Bird tickets went on sale to registered online users on Friday 8 August, and to all-comers on Friday 15 August at the 2008 price of €224.50 (including booking fee). These were limited to four per person, with a free car park space with every four tickets. Tickets went on general release on 6 March 2009 at 08:00. Once again, it was possible to buy an additional Thursday Camping Pass for €20. As of 23 April, Oxegen 2009 had not yet sold out. It had not sold out by 20 June either. It eventually sold out on 12 July after a sudden rush for day tickets. As with the 2008 festival, the campsite opened on the Thursday evening to prevent traffic queues forming on the Friday.

The popularity of a ticket deposit scheme introduced in March 2009 was confirmed when it returned in May.

=== Early reports ===
On Thursday 17 July 2008, just days after the 2008 festival had ended, Phantom FM published a report suggesting that organisers of T in the Park, Oxegen's sister festival which traditionally shares many of the same bands as Oxegen, were reportedly seeking David Bowie to headline the 2009 festival which took place on the same weekend. The 62-year-old was previously due to headline both T and Oxegen in 2004, but had to pull out due to illness. Klaxons put themselves in contention to play at Oxegen 2009 after announcing that they will "play every festival possible" in 2009. But they didn't.

=== Official announcements ===
Kings of Leon were again the first band to be confirmed for Oxegen in 2009, with their announcement coming on 28 January 2009. They headlined for the second consecutive year, having won the approval of fans in an online vote for a second consecutive year as well. Hot Press then announced what they claimed was a "world exclusive" late on 28 January 2009 that Snow Patrol and The Killers, headliners in 2007, would be co-headliners in 2009. An appearance by Snow Patrol was confirmed by the organisers within two days, with Katy Perry, Bloc Party and The Script also being confirmed on 30 January 2009. Kings of Leon played Oxegen's sister festival T in the Park on its Friday whilst Snow Patrol played T on its Sunday night. Also from T in the Park persistent rumours have forced the organisers to deny that AC/DC are the other headliners.

On 5 February, the reformed Blur were announced as the remaining headliners in what was their only Irish appearance of the year and their first in Ireland since three shows in the Olympia Theatre, Dublin in 2003. It will also be only the third time that all the original members will be together since 2000, with the second occurring a week earlier in Hyde Park, London at a 55,000 sell-out show which followed an appearance at Glastonbury 2009. The Killers were named as headliners on 18 February.

On 12 February, The Irish Times announced that Pete Doherty would be playing the festival. Doherty was confirmed within twenty-four hours alongside nine other acts: Razorlight, Nick Cave and the Bad Seeds, Elbow, Yeah Yeah Yeahs, The Ting Tings, White Lies, Fight Like Apes, Pendulum and Jason Mraz. On 24 February, Keane, Lily Allen, The Specials, Paolo Nutini, Wallis Bird, Digitalism, The Mars Volta, Swedish House Mafia, Miss Kittin/The Hacker, Crookers, and Hockey were confirmed by MCD. The Specials were announced after they reformed to celebrate thirty years in the music business, although it was unclear at the time if founding member Jerry Dammers would be included. The Truffle Shuffles learned of their invitation to perform whilst live on Rick O'Shea's RTÉ 2fm radio show on 25 February. On 3 March, eleven new acts were added to the line-up for Oxegen 2009. These were Lady Gaga, Manic Street Preachers, Florence and the Machine, TV on the Radio, The Game, Ladyhawke, James, Foals, Of Montreal, Friendly Fires and Squeeze. James will play a warm-up show in The Academy on 8 July. On 5 March, Oxegen 2009 was officially launched by the organisers, with an initial stage breakdown unveiled and a number of new acts announced. These included Nine Inch Nails, Jane's Addiction, Pet Shop Boys, Glasvegas, The Saturdays, Doves, Eagles of Death Metal and God Is an Astronaut.

Techno/electronica musicians Niall "Mano le Tough" Mannion and Ruairi Donohue of the Red Bull Music Academy also performed at Oxegen in 2009. On 8 April, 202s announced they would be performing on the Friday of the festival. Calvin Harris, Noisettes, The Saw Doctors, The Coronas, The Blizzards, The Answer, The Horrors, Iglu & Hartly, Starsailor and Spinnerette were added to the line-up on 28 April. La Roux cancelled citing "touring commitments". One DJ or VJ was offered a half-hour slot at the festival in association with Xbox. More dance acts, including Felix da Housecat and The Japanese Popstars, were announced on 7 May 2009. On 14 May 2009, Therapy?, Tinchy Stryder, Boys Noize and Fever Ray (Karin Dreijer Andersson of The Knife) were all announced.

MCD announced the stage breakdown on 18 May 2009. The return of the Hot Press Signing Tent was confirmed on 21 May 2009. The line-up for the Red Bull Music Academy was confirmed on 22 May 2009. The Hot Press New Band Stage line-up was announced on 27 May 2009. On 3 June 2009, the IMRO New Sounds Stage line-up was announced, with David Kitt, Director and Villagers confirmed as headliners. Also performing on that stage are C O D E S, Heathers, Blood or Whiskey, Juno Award winners Wintersleep, Broken Record from Scotland, Home Star Runner and Concerto For Constantine.

On 12 June 2009, the entertainment line-up and further details of facilities for campers was announced. The campsite remained open until 18:00 on the Monday after the festival. The Thursday night entertainment featured bands such as Snakes of Desire, The Stone Roses Experience, Definitely Might Be and Hells Bells. The Xbox Live Stage was located to the Blue Campsite and ran each day of the festival from 14:00 until late into the night and the Headphone Disco is available to a maximum 2,500 campers per night. A funfair was present in each campsite (the previous year had one shared between all the campsites) and other features included barbecue areas for those with disposable barbecues, the Pull Parlour Salon and better facilities for phone charging. Scouting Ireland returned to offer their free tent pitching service.

Several acts were added to the Bacardi Arena on 25 June 2009. The return of Heineken Greenspace was announced on 29 June 2009. The stage times were released on 1 July 2009.

=== Related events ===
The Blizzards performed a live online show on their website in association with Xbox on 27 May 2009. The webcast preceded appearances by the band and the return of the Xbox Live Stage to Oxegen 2009. Xbox also ran a competition with a top prize of a half-hour DJ set on the Xbox Live Stage at Oxegen 2009.

The Irish Minister for Communications, Energy and Natural Resources Eamon Ryan endorsed a "Rock the Environment" competition designed to promote Oxegen 2009 as being a "green festival". Ryan said the festival was "sustainable, green and fun". Competitors were asked to send in their environmentally-friendly videos to the Oxegen Muzu TV channel. Winners will have their entries broadcast in the green Ecogen area.

Two acts from County Kildare featured at Oxegen in 2009; these were decided via the annual Platform V contest. Box Social, Colin Scallan, I Phoenix, The J-Walkers, The Resistance and Seven Days were the six finalists; two were selected in Naas, County Kildare on 19 June.

The Road Safety Authority (RSA), Kildare County Council and MCD used youth radio stations to front a road safety campaign throughout Oxegen 2009. Billboards of four young persons from County Kildare who died in 2005 and 2007 were on display onsite. Mobile messages and the big stage screens were also used to promote road safety.

The Irish Society of Chartered Physiotherapists and the Chartered Society of Physiotherapy Northern Ireland jointly produced a festival guide aimed at fans, issuing advice on walking, camping and how to dance appropriately and pain-free.

=== Publications ===
Several newspapers and magazines issued special editions for Oxegen 2009.

Hot Press featured the Ultimate Guide to Oxegen '09 prior to the festival. It included the favourite Oxegen moments of six Irish musicians and interviews with Brody Dalle of Spinnerette and Dave Keuning of headliners The Killers. They also made several music videos of artists performing on the New Bands Stage available on their website.

One week before the festival, Gary Lightbody of Oxegen headliners Snow Patrol was chosen as guest editor of The Ticket, The Irish Times's weekly music supplement. Lightbody selected two musicians whose performances were covered in that week's edition—he chose Lisa Hannigan and Josh Ritter—and also chose which bands Jim Carroll would write about in his column about new music. Lightbody also wrote a guide to surviving festivals, interviewed Glenn Moule of the band Howling Bells and wrote a piece on which artists he intended to see perform at Oxegen, including Lily Allen, Republic of Loose, Patrick Wolf, TV on the Radio, Annie Mac, Elbow, Friendly Fires and Crystal Castles.

The Irish Independent featured numerous Oxegen-related articles on 3 July 2009. These included reports on Blur, Fight Like Apes, Snow Patrol, The Ting Tings, Jerry Fish, a piece on Northern Irish acts such as David Holmes, That Petrol Emotion, Therapy?, Duke Special and The Answer, a piece on newer acts, twenty selected facts and an A–Z of festival fashion. Gary Lightbody talked of his first time when Snow Patrol were in their early twenties and spent the night drinking and "being silly".

=== Traffic ===
Traffic delays were encountered by fans on their way to the festival on 9 July. MCD suggested fans ought to expect an additional three hours of travel time. Buses in Limerick and Waterford were full since that morning, whilst those in Cork and Galway were said to be "meeting demand". Northern Ireland also experienced what was described by media as "a mass exodus" of fans to Oxegen 2009. Dublin Bus, which operates public transport from Parnell Square to Punchestown, said its journeys were running at one hour and ten minutes, a "good" time according to the company. 30,000 campers were on site by the Thursday night.

The campsite opened at noon, with 35,000 campers having arrived by the Thursday night. These were entertained by AC/DC, Oasis and The Stone Roses cover bands on the Thursday Night Live Stage.

Traffic after the festival was reported to be "moving well on all routes".

== Festival ==
=== Weather ===
Festival-goers and musicians alike experienced rain and mud at Oxegen 2009. Hours of heavy torrential rain fell throughout the Saturday but, whilst wellies and raincoats were seen throughout the Saturday, the Sunday weather was sunnier.

Jason Mraz described the weather as "perfect", saying that "going in and out of rain and sun [...] is a great way to celebrate." He then claimed: "I've never experiences [sic] torrential rain in my life." MC Double D of Sneaky Sound System described the differing tolerance for rain in Ireland and his native country. "You like it wet over here. I'm from Australia and we don't like it wet over there. You guys get a bit annoyed if it's too sunny I think. [...] We're playing in a tent so I can't complain."

=== Performances ===
The Artane Boys Band, described as "one of the most famous warm-up acts in the country", opened Oxegen 2009 in an appearance described as "unlikely" by the Irish Independent. The first band to appear on the Hot Press New Band Stage on the Friday were The Truffle Shuffles, winners of RTÉ 2fm's School of Rock competition. The band later met Main Stage performers The Script, giving Danny O'Donoghue a CD of their music. The Script themselves announced a five-night residency in Dublin's Olympia Theatre, beginning on 25 August 2009. Onstage they described the place as "crazy" and spoke of how they had been in the audience two years previously. James warmed up for their Friday performance with a show at The Academy in Dublin the night before.

Lily Allen mingled with fans and had a song dedicated to her by Snow Patrol following her Main Stage performance (above).

Lily Allen altered lyrics to one of her songs due to having a young Irish cousin in the audience. She had flown in from Belgrade and her performance included a cover version of "Womanizer" by Britney Spears and "Fuck You", her ode to George W. Bush, which had the crowd raising their middle fingers during the chorus. She also performed her cover version of the Kaiser Chiefs song "Oh My God" but bemoaned the crowd's reaction to some of her songs, yelling: "Oh, you guys are like women. C'mon you lot!" She later wandered around talking to fans alongside two bodyguards.

Snow Patrol flew from Italy to perform at Oxegen 2009, interrupting their time spent touring with U2. They dedicated "Shut Your Eyes" to Lily Allen in their Main Stage performance before Blur. Blur were said to have been paid €500,000 to perform at Oxegen 2009, headlining on the Friday night from 23:00. They played songs from three decades and paid tribute to an Irish music journalist who had assisted in their rise to fame, dedicating "There's No Other Way" to him, with lead singer Damon Albarn saying: "The first time we were here [in Ireland] was back in 1990. We played at a wedding for Leo Finlay, who has since passed away." Albarn also said it had been "a fantastic couple of weeks after not doing much for 10 years.". They also dedicated "The Universal" to Joe Dolan who had covered the song before his death.

Fred were the first band on the Green Spheres stage on the Saturday, playing to a large crowd and ending with singles "Running" and "Skyscrapers". Squeeze attracted increasing crowds throughout their time on the Main Stage, performing just before The Blizzards played to an even more significant sized crowd. Guy Garvey of Elbow thanked fans watching them despite the bad weather on the Saturday evening. Doves drew a large crowd to the O2 Stage despite performing at the same time as Bloc Party on the Main Stage. Nick Cave and the Bad Seeds, however, attracted a small enough crowd to the same stage, with several fans leaving to see headliners Kings of Leon on the Main Stage.

Kings of Leon headlined Oxegen from 23:30 on the Saturday despite threatening to withdraw from the festival after encountering serious sound problems at their T in the Park show in Scotland the day before. The sound problems frustrated vocalist Caleb Followill and led him to destroy his guitar before hurling the shattered remnants into the crowd. The band's tour manager intervened, with the band ultimately deciding to travel to Ireland. A source explained that the band's anger was due to their desire for "every show to be perfect". Several international celebrities watched Kings of Leon perform at Oxegen 2009; Pete Doherty and Stereophonics frontman Kelly Jones watched from the side of the stage, whilst actress Natalie Portman "disappeared down into the mosh pit" where she was seen "every now and then jumping up and down and belting out her favourite songs". The band said Oxegen was "the gig we've been looking forward to most this year".

Lady Gaga underwent a wardrobe malfunction live on stage during her Sunday performance when one of her breasts slid from beneath her metallic dress. After a breakdown during her second song, Gaga expressed her frustrations at her production team: "I can't hear myself for a moment there. That was close there for a minute. It's my worst nightmare not being able to hear. I'd rather cut my fucking feet off rather than not be able to hear" and praised Irish fans for their battles against the weather: "You all suffer for your love of music, like Jesus" as well as saying: "If you told me this time last year I’d be playing in front of 100,000 people, I’d probably have told you to fuck off". She also had several costume changes, at one point appearing on a blue Vespa scooter and, during her single "Poker Face", writhing around on board a piano. Prior to the performance she had attracted attention for requesting underwear from festival organisers and was overheard asking about how to pronounce Naas.

The Horrors cancelled their appearance at Oxegen 2009 when frontman Faris Badwan was struck down with bronchitis. Foals saw an increased crowd to their Heineken Green Spheres performance when rain drew festival-goers inside. The Ting Tings also drew large numbers to the O2 Stage. Perry Farrell of Jane's Addiction referenced Guinness, Jameson and cocaine during his band's performance. Villagers "set alight a sparsely populated tent with a performance bordering on perfection", according to the Irish Independent. Sunday night headliners The Killers attracted large crowds to the main arena but attendance at Manic Street Preachers and Nine Inch Nails suffered from those bands performing at the same time on other stages.

=== Signing tent ===
The first part of the line-up for the Hot Press signing tent was announced on 7 July 2009, with acts including Paolo Nutini, Razorlight, The Virgins, Fun Lovin' Criminals, The Blizzards, Hockey, Duke Special, Republic of Loose, The Coronas, Spinnerette, Friendly Fires and Therapy?. Other acts were later announced, including Noisettes (Sunday), Jerry Fish (Saturday), Doves (Saturday), Maxïmo Park (Saturday), Squeeze (Saturday) The Airborne Toxic Event (Saturday), and That Petrol Emotion (Sunday). A timetable was released on the Hot Press website on 10 July.

Republic of Loose, represented by all the band's members, were the first act to appear in the signing tent at around 18:00 on the Friday evening. Fans of The Coronas sang their "San Diego Song" whilst queueing, with the band also revealing the title of the second album for the first time, saying they had only decided on the title that day. Duke Special was greeted by several males in superhero costumes, whilst one fan who received an autograph from Brody Dalle of Spinnerette claimed she would have it tattooed onto her.

Hockey were the first band to appear in the signing tent on the Saturday.

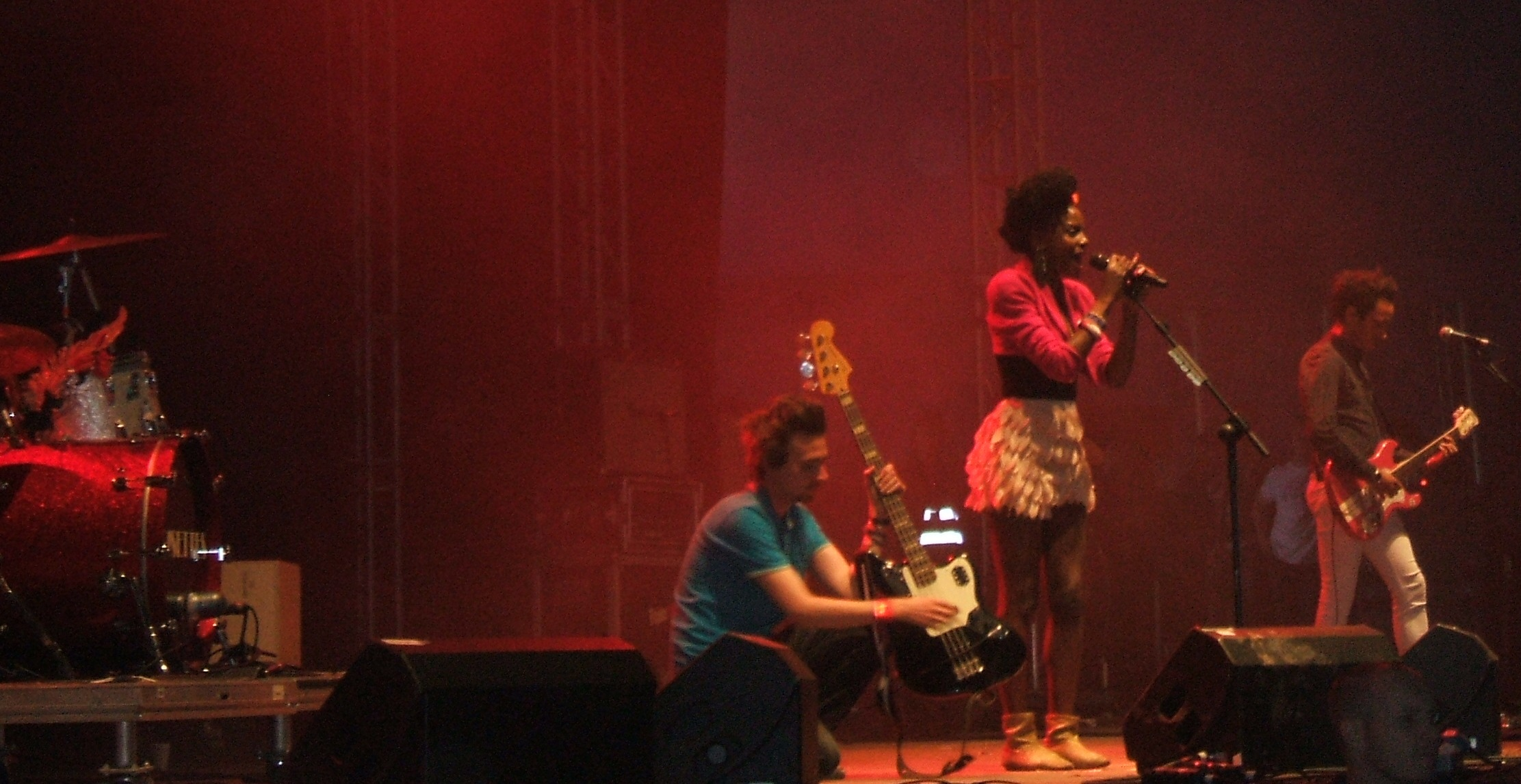
Noisettes on the Green Spheres Stage at Oxegen '09.

Friendly Fires were the first band to appear in the signing tent on the Sunday. One fan signed the bicep of lead singer Ed Macfarlane. Noisettes supplied lollipops and were dabbed with face paints by fans. Paolo Nutini signed autographs for twenty-five minutes longer than originally intended and shared wine gums with fans.

=== Backstage ===
A black and pink "chill-out area" decorated with black leather sofas was filled with fruits and flowers for the headlining bands. Performers were able to access areas with pool tables, bean bags and a bar.

One member of The Saturdays was nearly struck with a cue ball by an unidentified person playing pool. "She looked at him like he had two heads. There's better things to do than throw a cue ball at a girl. Maybe I'm not good at this but I don't claim to chat up girls by throwing cue balls at them... I throw the black at them!" said Niall Breslin of The Blizzards who witnessed the incident.

Danny O'Reilly of The Coronas described his band's performance as "so amazing" with "a really great atmosphere [...] the best gig we've done in a long time".

Members of Republic of Loose reported that they were "stalked" repeatedly by Lily Allen.

Max Grahn of Carolina Liar described meeting Irish fans for the first time, saying: "We got here for the first time in our lives yesterday. They know the songs and they know our names. It's crazy. We hope to be back in August."

Jason Mraz said Ireland had "always a very appreciative crowd, always a very vocal crowd, a singing bunch. I love them."

=== VIP guests ===
Rugby union player Brian O'Driscoll and his actress friend Amy Huberman were in attendance, camping in a Winnebago. Upon trying to view Kings of Leon on a platform he was turned back by security as he did not have the correct wristband. Annoyed at this rejection, O'Driscoll left the festival early and flew to Dublin's RDS venue for a Bruce Springsteen concert, where he had a much more enjoyable time and cried when Springsteen complimented him on stage on his sporting prowess. Pete Doherty, Kelly Jones and Natalie Portman also attended the Kings of Leon show at Oxegen 2009.

MTV presenter Laura Whitmore was seen backstage with Dan & Becs actress Holly White as well as actor Colin Morgan and actress Katie McGrath, of the BBC television series Merlin. Whitmore was also subject to speculation in the media when she was seen snuggling against TG4's Eoghan McDermott and walking around hand in hand with him. She moved to deny reports of romance, claiming they were "merely keeping each other company as they shot their respective footage of the festival" and said she had most enjoyed Blur.

=== Crime ===
Gardaí arrested 114 people throughout Oxegen 2009, mainly for offences relating to public order, traffic, assault and drugs. 100 of these arrests had been reported by the Sunday evening. 77 of the arrests occurred between the Thursday afternoon and the Saturday. 12 of the arrests had been made by the Friday. There were less arrests at Oxegen 2009 than at Oxegen 2008 when 140 arrests were made.

In one serious incident, a man in his twenties was left in a stable condition after being stabbed with a glass bottle in a car park close to midnight on the Friday. He was sent to Naas General Hospital before being taken to Saint James's Hospital, Dublin. One man was arrested in relation to the incident but was not charged and later released.

== Aftermath ==
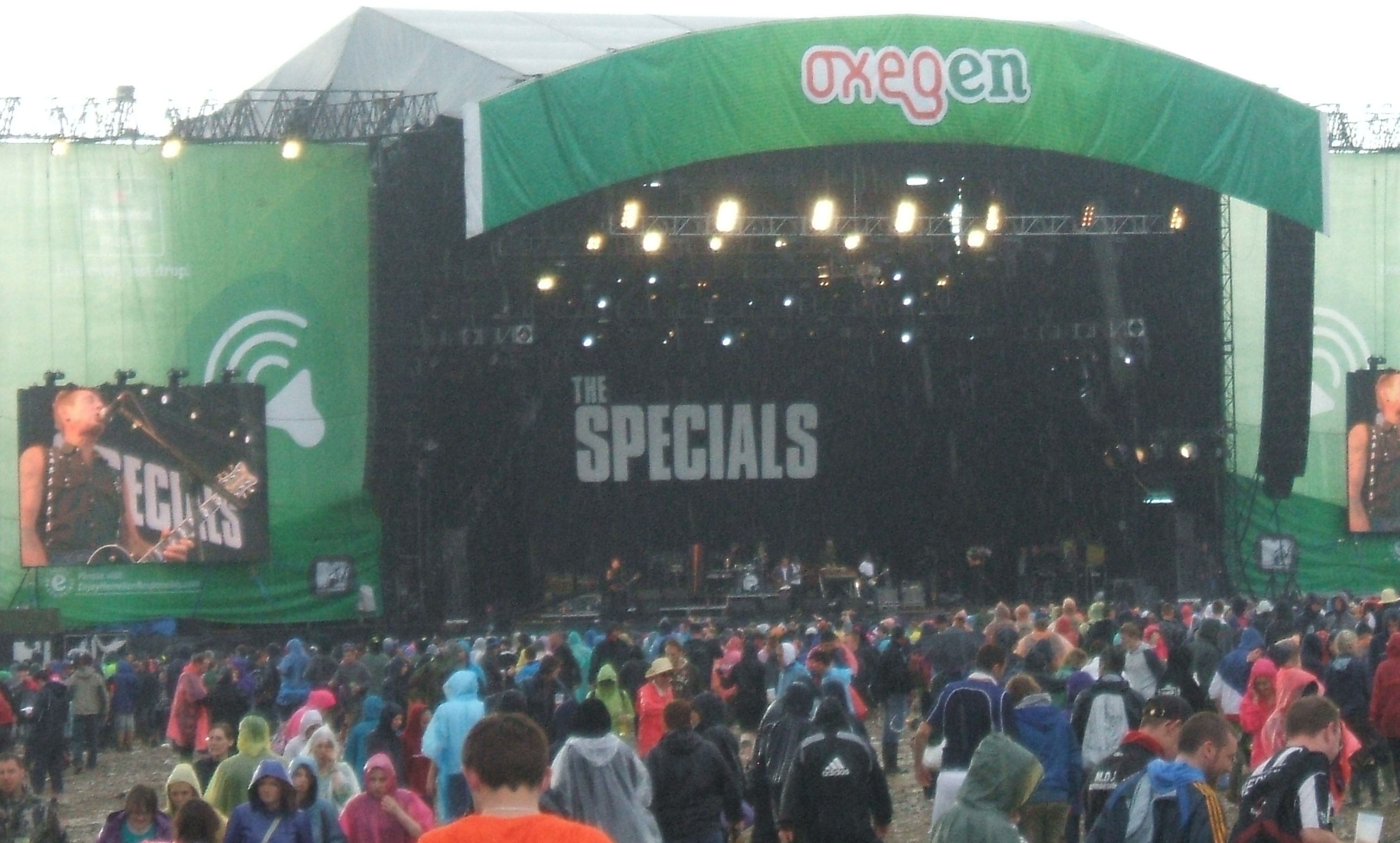
The Specials entertained a wet and muddy crowd on the Main Stage, later announcing further Irish shows in Belfast and Dublin.

=== Cleanup ===
The site was described as resembling "a massive swamp" by the Evening Herald on the Sunday morning. Approximately 1,000 personnel and Scout volunteers were clearing the site of stage equipment, litter and abandoned tents by Monday afternoon. The Irish Independent reported that Punchestown Racecourse resembled "a scene from the World War I battle trenches" after being battered by heavy rain, whilst the Irish Examiner suggested that the Ploughing Championships had arrived in Dublin the day after the festival so noticeable were the "wellie-wearing punters [who] stepped off buses, full of cheer, bearing muddy rain jackets and laden with picnic and camping equipment". Buses deposited fans on Dublin's quays "where muddy wellies and bits of tents lay abandoned on the paths".

=== Returning bands ===
Several international acts announced future Irish dates during and in the immediate aftermath of Oxegen 2009. Yeah Yeah Yeahs will play a show in Belfast on 26 August 2009. The Specials will play shows in Dublin's Olympia Theatre and in Belfast as part of their 30th Anniversary Tour on 15 and 16 November respectively. Carolina Liar also announced their headlining Irish debut at The Academy in Dublin for 18 August 2009. Noisettes moved their 10 October show from The Button Factory to Vicar Street due to increased demand.

== Broadcasting rights ==
MTV was the Oxegen 2009 official broadcasting partner, with Laura Whitmore amongst the presenting team. The highlights will be shown in late July–early August on MTV, MTV HITS, MTV TWO and VH1 channels across one weekend.

RTÉ 2fm and RTÉ 2XM broadcast a total of 21 hours of live coverage throughout Oxegen 2009. Dan Hegarty presented a special Oxegen IMRO Tasters Show in the week before the festival. Festival broadcasts began from 06:00 on 10 July during that morning's The Colm & Jim-Jim Breakfast Show. Jenny Green and Jenny Huston broadcast live music from 19:00 that evening, whilst Hegarty, Cormac Battle and Mr. Spring conducted acoustic sessions and interviews. RTÉ 2fm also recorded all the acts from the IMRO New Sounds Stage.

Phantom FM aired a three-hour Oxegen 2009 special programme at 15:00 on 19 July 2009.

== Stages ==
Oxegen 2009 had at least seven stages. There was at least one new stage, the Red Bull Music Academy. The Green Room was renamed Heineken Green Spheres.

- The Main Stage was headlined by Blur, Snow Patrol, Kings of Leon and The Killers.
- The O2 Stage was headlined by Keane, Nick Cave and the Bad Seeds and Nine Inch Nails.
- Heineken Green Spheres was headlined by 2 Many DJs, Pet Shop Boys and (jointly) Manic Street Preachers/Glasvegas.
- The Red Bull Music Academy was headlined by Ladyhawke, Of Montreal and Florence and the Machine.
- The IMRO New Sounds Stage was headlined by David Kitt, Director and Villagers.
- The Oxegen Dance Arena was headlined by Deadmau5, Tiga and Felix Da Housecat.

== 2009 Line-up ==
Headliners: Blur / Kings of Leon / The Killers Line-up and stage breakdown.

=== Main Stage ===
Friday 10 July	Saturday 11 July	Sunday 12 July
Blur; Snow Patrol; The Script; Lily Allen; James; The Coronas; The Artane Boys Band & The Brilliant Things	Kings of Leon; Bloc Party; Elbow; Yeah Yeah Yeahs; James Morrison; The Blizzards; Squeeze; The Saw Doctors	The Killers; Razorlight; The Specials; Paolo Nutini; Lady Gaga; Calvin Harris; Ocean Color Scene

=== The O2 Stage ===
Friday 10 July	Saturday 11 July	Sunday 12 July
Keane; Pendulum; Fun Lovin' Criminals; Duke Special; Therapy?; The Answer; Telegraphs	Nick Cave & The Bad Seeds; Doves; The Mars Volta; Maxïmo Park; Eagles Of Death Metal; The Game; The Gaslight Anthem; Red Light Company	Nine Inch Nails; Jane's Addiction; The Ting Tings; Katy Perry; White Lies; Starsailor; You Me At Six; The Horrors

=== Heineken Green Spheres ===
Friday 10 July	Saturday 11 July	Sunday 12 July
2 Many DJ's; Republic of Loose; Mogwai; Fight Like Apes; Dreadzone; God Is An Astronaut; Dirty Epics	Jerry Fish & The Mudbug Club; Pet Shop Boys; TV on the Radio; Pete Doherty; Regina Spektor; The Saturdays; Daniel Merriweather; Gary Go; Fred	Manic Street Preachers; Glasvegas; Jason Mraz; Foals; Friendly Fires; That Petrol Emotion; Noisettes; Iglu & Hartly

=== Hot Press New Bands Stage ===
Friday 10 July	Saturday 11 July	Sunday 12 July
O Emperor; Pulled Apart by Horses; Spinnerette; Metronomy; Iain Archer; The Hours; Carolina Liar; Dinosaur Pile-Up; Mumford & Sons; Carolina Liar; Priscilla Ahn; The Truffle Shuffles	The Airborne Toxic Event; Go Audio; Patrick Wolf; Sneaky Sound System; Little Boots; Hockey; Passion Pit; In Case of Fire; Howling Bells; Will and the People; Seven Days	The Twang; Camera Obscura; The Chapters; Wild Beasts; The Virgins; The Maccabees; Wallis Bird; Bombay Bicycle Club; The Phenomenal Handclap Band; Box Social

=== Oxegen Dance Arena ===
Friday 10 July	Saturday 11 July	Sunday 12 July
Deadmau5; Swedish House Mafia; Crookers; Aeroplane (DJ Set); Frankmusik; Evil 9; The Japanese Popstars; Burns; Gordo; Tom Middleton	Tiga; Boys Noize; Annie Mac; Digitalism; Dr Lektroluv; Popof; Don Romini; DJ Philth; Bitches With Wolves; Louis Osbourne	Felix Da Housecat; Miss Kittin & The Hacker (Live); MSTRKRFT; The Bloody Beetroots; Yusek; Kissy Sell Out; Fever Ray; Nialler 9; Hudson Mohawke; Scott McNaughton

=== IMRO New Sounds Stage ===
Friday 10 July	Saturday 11 July	Sunday 12 July
The Mighty Stef; Yes Cadets; The Flaws; David Kitt; Heathers; The Joy Formidable; Cashier No. 9; Ruth Anne Cunningham; The Brilliant Things; Home Star Runner; Stone Motion; Silverbird	Cap Pas Cap; And So I Watch You From Afar; C O D E S .; Director; General Fiasco; St. Vincent; Joe Echo; Nightbox; Angel Pier; Carosel; Jenna Toro; Distractors	Concerto For Constantine; Dark Room Notes; Villagers; Wintersleep; Broken Records; The Chakras; The Jades; Andrew Hozier-Byrne; Bone; Susie Soho

=== Red Bull Music Academy Tent ===
Friday 10 July	Saturday 11 July	Sunday 12 July
Arveene; David Holmes; Chloe; ~~Ladyhawke~~; M83; Johnny Moy; Jape; Lukid; 202's	DJ Tu-Ki; Mano Le Tough; Crystal Castles; Tinchy Stryder; Colm K; Messiah J and the Expert; Defcon; Rizm; Jamie Woon	Mikki Dee & Mystro; Onra; Florence and the Machine; Of Montreal; Casio Kids; Telepathe; Goldielocks; R.S.A.G.; Ruairi Donohue

=== Bicardi B-Live Arena ===
Friday 10 July	Saturday 11 July	Sunday 12 July
Krafty Kuts; Beardyman; Disco Bloodbath; Dublin Streets	Filthy Dukes; Idiot Proof; Horsemeat Disco; Sound Check	A Skillz; Slammin Boys; Unabombers; Remedy Ireland

- The Stone Roses Experience have also confirmed that they appeared on the Thursday night.

Preceded by Oxegen '08	Oxegen; 2009	Succeeded by Oxegen '10
