= Mick Pyro =

Irish musician

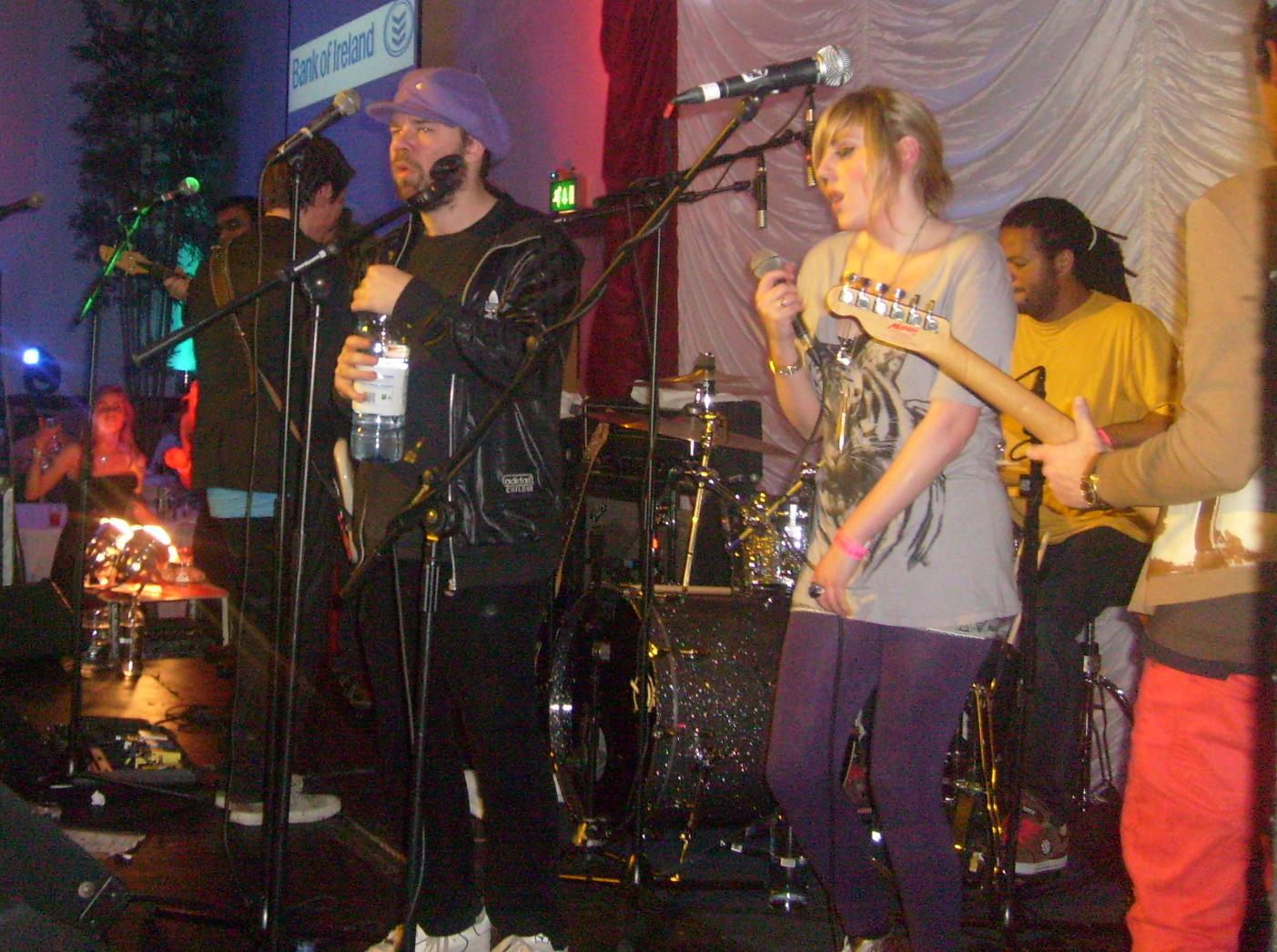
- Mick Pyro (left) on stage with Republic of Loose

Background information
- Born: Michael Tierney
- Genres: Funk rock, hip hop, soul, blues
- Occupations: Musician, singer-songwriter
- Instrument: Vocals

Michael Tierney, better known as Mick Pyro, is an Irish musician. He is best known as the frontman of the Dublin funk rock band Republic of Loose. He has also participated in other independent work with Irish and international musicians. He has also written for the Irish Independent. He released his first solo album, Exit Pyro, in 2023.

== Education and influences ==
Pyro has an MA in Renaissance literature and is an avid reader. He is known for his diverse musical tastes and likes hip hop, soul and blues. He has described hip hop as "one of the most innovative art-forms around and it's constantly capable of shocking and surprising me". Pyro cites Cee-Lo Green's 2004 album Cee-Lo Green... Is the Soul Machine as his favorite album. Pyro has also cited 1980s soul and funk artists Alexander O'Neal and Rick James as his heroes. He also likes metal and listens to blues and jazz such as Howlin' Wolf, John Lee Hooker, Mahalia Jackson and soul singers such as Al Green and Solomon Burke.

== Style ==
Pyro is known for his excessive stage antics, with The Irish Times describing him as having "cajoled, provoked, teased, screamed, shouted, stomped and flirted away" through an entire set with Republic of Loose, whilst the Irish Independent has compared him to "an insane rock version of Robbie Williams, with the voice of a young and drunk James Brown". John Meagher, writing in the Irish Independent, described Pyro as "the focal and vocal point of Republic of Loose" who "works his stage like a Joshua Tree-era Bono" During Republic of Loose's 2008 residency at the Dublin Academy, Pyro's stage presence was described by Ed Power in the Irish Independent as "more wedding-dance flap than Harlem shuffle, but he carries his shtick off with so much charisma you find yourself applauding instead of guffawing". His battles with alcoholism are chronicled in the song "Poquito" which features on the Republic of Loose album Vol IV: Johnny Pyro and the Dance of Evil and he also wrote the song "Comeback Girl" whilst drunk.

== Career ==
Mick Pyro performed with self-described "rubbish rock bands" for several years before the formation of Republic of Loose. Experiencing what he termed "a huge metaphysical overturning of my value system", Pyro developed a fascination with musicians such as James Brown and The Rolling Stones. This change of musical interest prompted him to create Johnny Pyro, an alter-ego, who, according to Pyro, "disassociated himself from the normal lifestyle of an Irish bourgeois kid". This alter-ego later developed into Republic of Loose. With this band, Pyro has performed at numerous music festivals, including Glastonbury Festival and Reading and Leeds Festivals in England. However the band sell most of their records in Ireland, where they have been regulars on the festival circuit for many years.

In 2008, Pyro was part of a collaboration of Irish and international musicians who combined to celebrate the life of Ronnie Drew by recording "The Ballad of Ronnie Drew" at Windmill Lane Studios in Dublin. During this recording he met Sinéad O'Connor, who asked him if they could perform a duet. O'Connor and Republic of Loose performed a cover of the Curtis Mayfield song "We People Who Are Darker Than Blue" during the Meteor Music Awards in 2007.

== Personal life ==
Pyro's sister, Annie, from Tieranniesaur and Yeh Deadlies was previously in a band called Chicks and Pyro helped write some of the songs. Pyro lives in the basement pad of a 1960s Swedish-style house in residential Dublin suburb of Terenure. Pyro has spoken about his battles with alcoholism.
