= I Like Music =

Single by Republic of Loose

from the album Vol IV: Johnny Pyro and the Dance of Evil
- Released: 2008
- Label: Loaded Dice Records
- Producer(s): Gareth Mannix

Republic of Loose singles chronology
"I Like Music" (2008)	"The Steady Song" (2008)

"I Like Music" (2008)
From the 2008 album Vol IV: Johnny Pyro and the Dance of Evil.

"I Like Music" is a 2008 single by the Irish musical ensemble Republic of Loose. It features on the album Vol IV: Johnny Pyro and the Dance of Evil, being the first single released from it. The band performed it on The Once a Week Show on 5 April 2008.

The Irish Independent's John Meagher, after witnessing a performance in April 2008, singled out "I Like Music" along with "23 Things I Don't Like" as songs likely to match or exceed tracks from their previous album.
