= Republic of Loose =

Irish rock band

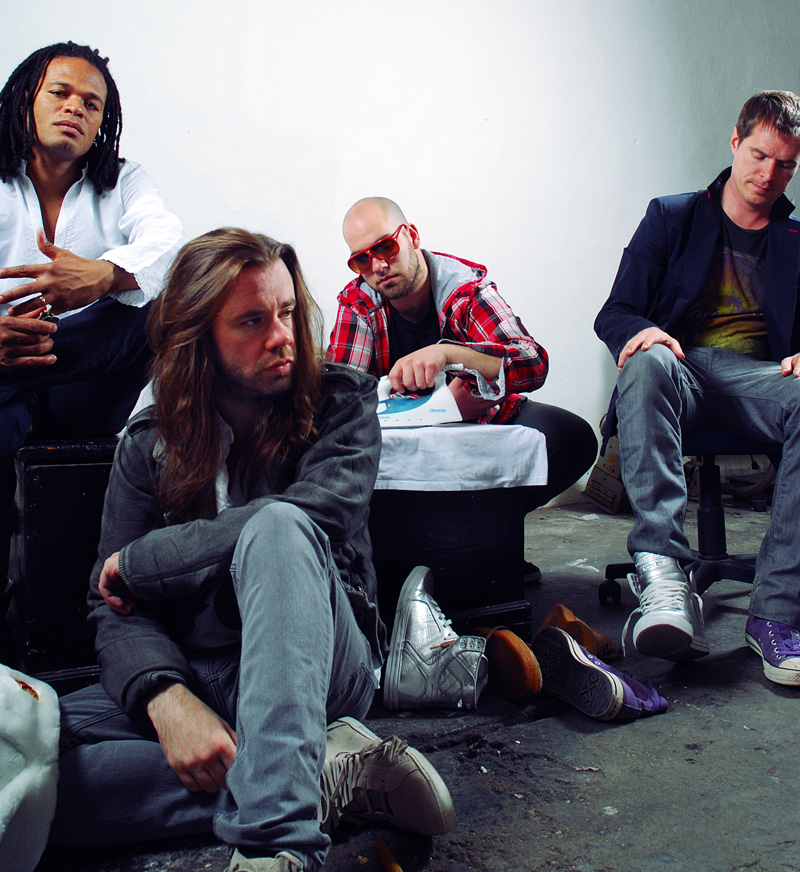
- Left to right: Andre Lopes, Mick Pyro, Benjamin Loose, Dave Pyro

Background information
- Origin: Dublin, Ireland
- Genres: Rock, blues, funk, soul
- Years active: 2001–2014
- Labels: Loaded Dice Records, Big Cat [UK]
- Members: Mick Pyro; Benjamin Loose; Deco; Dave Pyro; Brez; Coz Nolan; Andre Lopes; Darach O'Laoire
- Website: www.republicofloose.com

Republic of Loose were an Irish funk and soul band from Dublin. Formed in 2001, the band formerly consisted of lead vocalist Mick Pyro, bassist and vocalist Benjamin Loose, keyboardist Deco, guitarists and vocalists Dave Pyro and Brez, and drummer Coz Nolan.

With a self-described musical style of "the stuff your dad likes", the band signed to Big Cat Records in 2003, recording their debut album This is the Tomb of the Juice which was released in 2004. They were named "Hope for 2004" at the 2004 Meteor Awards. In 2005, the singles "Comeback Girl" and "You Know It" received significant airplay on Irish radio. Republic of Loose's second album Aaagh!, released in April 2006, reached number two in the Irish Albums Chart, achieving platinum sales and a Choice Music Prize nomination in the process. It spawned several more successful singles, including "Break" which achieved notoriety in South Africa where a radio station banned it following complaints regarding its allegedly explicit lyrics. Vol IV: Johnny Pyro and the Dance of Evil, Republic of Loose's third album, was released in 2008. That album produced their highest chart performer to date, "The Steady Song", which peaked at number twelve and stayed in the Irish Singles Chart for thirteen weeks. Bounce at the Devil, the band's fourth album, was released in 2010.

Having earned the admiration of several musicians, including members of Snow Patrol and U2, as well as Sinéad O'Connor—with whom they recorded, released and performed a duet at the 2008 Meteor Awards—the band have had their music played on radio stations in Africa, Asia, Europe and North America. The Irish Times placed them at number thirty-seven in a list of "The 50 Best Irish Acts Right Now" published in April 2009, referring to them as "one of Ireland's most original bands" led by "the gruff singer with the extraordinary soul voice [...] simultaneously channelling the spirits of James Brown and James Joyce in one fell swoop." Aside from U2 and Bell X1, they are the Irish band with the most airplay in their native country. In August 2014, vocalist Mick Pyro confirmed that the band had split.

== History ==
=== Formation ===
Mick Pyro performed with self-described "rubbish rock bands" for several years before the formation of The Republic of Loose. During this time, he was, according to himself, "depressed out of my brains" and listened to artists such as Manic Street Preachers. Experiencing what he termed "a huge metaphysical overturning of my value system", Pyro had developed a fascination with musicians such as James Brown and The Rolling Stones, or "the stuff your Dad likes". This change of musical interest prompted him to create Johnny Pyro, an alter-ego, who, according to Pyro, "disassociated himself from the normal lifestyle of an Irish bourgeois kid". This alter-ego would later develop into Johnny Pyro And The Rock Coma (Mick Pyro, Dave Pyro, Coz Nolan, Mark Dennehy and Emmet Cole). The band recorded an EP, which featured four of the songs that later appeared on the Republic of Loose's first album, 'This Is The Tomb Of The Juice.' Following the departure of guitarist Emmet Cole (who wrote the song "Black Bread") and bassist Mark Dennehey "To Texas and Ringsend," respectively, Johnny Pyro and Rock Coma split.

About a year later the Republic of Loose was formed. Benjamin Loose studied theology in Trinity College Dublin before performing in a country band with Mick Pyro. Dave Pyro used to play guitar with Brez and Deco joined them to play keys. The name Republic of Loose was settled upon in 2001 when Dave and Mick, combined with Brez, Deco, Coz Nolan, who had been Mick's schoolfriend, and Benjamin Loose.

=== This is the Tomb of the Juice ===
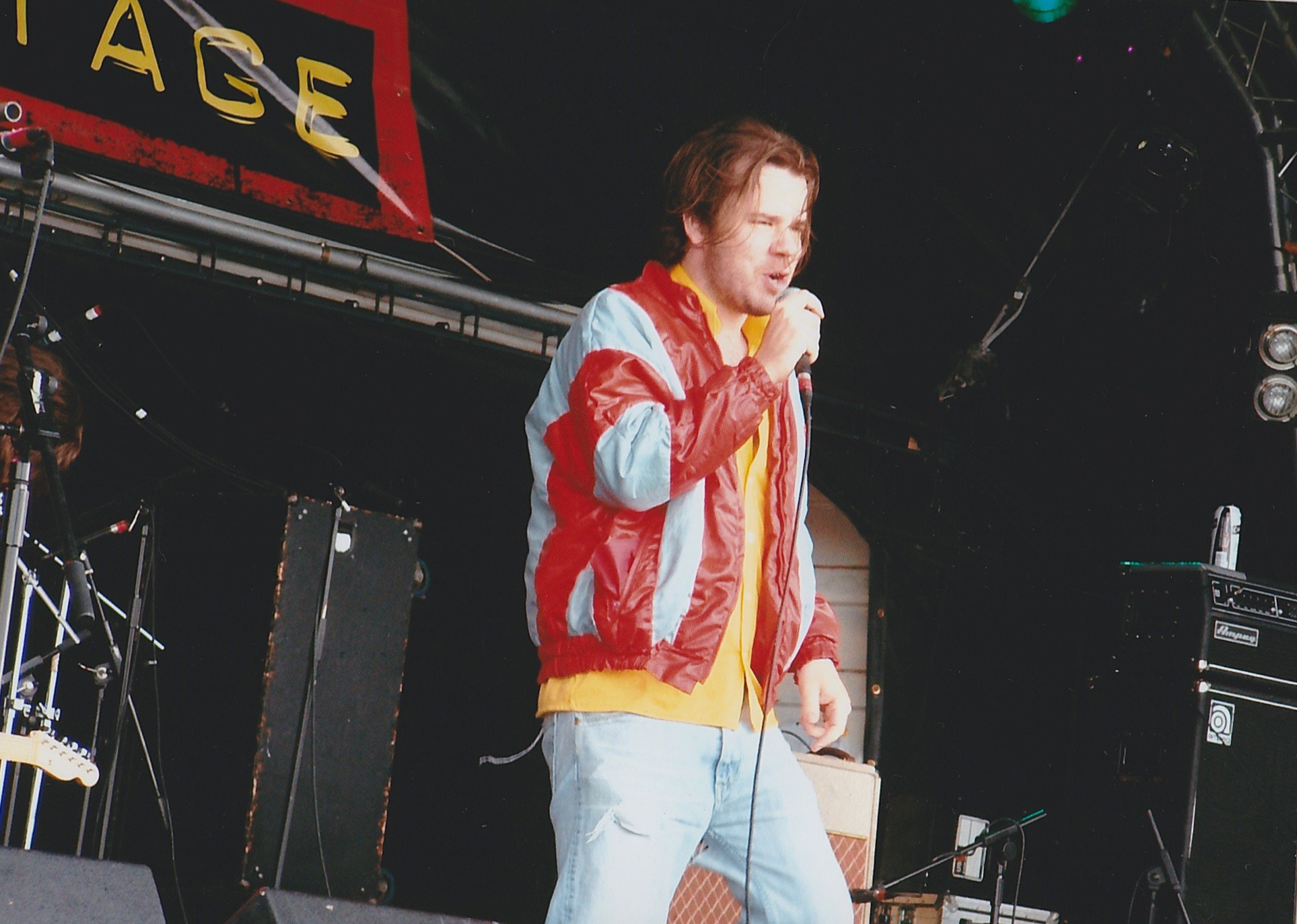
Republic of Loose performing at Guilfest 2004, promoting This Is the Tomb of the Juice

The band's break, according to Mick Pyro, came as a result of ten days recording time they won in "some competition or something, some fucking battle of the bands". In 2003, Republic of Loose signed to Big Cat Records. The single "Girl I'm Gonna Fuck You Up", released in late 2003, was largely ignored by daytime radio in Ireland, with Mick Pyro commenting in an early Hot Press interview: "We were never going to be the type of band that Larry Gogan or Ian Dempsey would play anyway, regardless of the lyric". The band's debut album, This is the Tomb of the Juice, was partially recorded in the ten days studio time they had won in the aforementioned competition. This is the Tomb of the Juice was recorded in 2003 then released in 2004. 2004 was also the year in which Republic of Loose débuted at Oxegen (on the New Band Stage), a festival at which they have since regularly performed. Singles "Comeback Girl" and "You Know It" were released in July and October 2005 respectively, both achieving significant airplay on Irish radio and entering the top thirty of the Irish Singles Chart. By 2006 the band had toured Ireland, the United Kingdom, where they performed at festivals such as Glastonbury and T in the Park, and France, where they performed at Furia Sound Festival, Nice Jazz Festival and Les Transmusicales. They also performed alongside veteran rock band Lir at Vicar Street in January 2006.

=== Aaagh! ===
At a cost of €70,000 to make, the band's second album, Aaagh! was released in 2006. Sunday Tribune journalist Una Mullally called it "one of the most original and progressive Irish albums ever made". Aaagh! reached number two in the Irish Albums Chart, going platinum in the process, received regular airplay on Irish radio and produced five singles, including "The Idiots", a song about Mick Pyro's former girlfriend which also features her on vocals. "Break", a top ten single in Ireland and top forty single in South Africa, was temporarily banned by South African radio station 5fm when a female DJ declared on air that it promoted anal sex without contraception, a comment which led to several complaints from listeners. The band's 2006 summer tour included a performance where fans danced outside despite "the lashing rain" at Oxegen 2006, with the Irish Independent's Larissa Nolan saying "their scheduling on the main stage was a testament to just how big their army of fans is", and Castlepalooza. In 2007, Republic of Loose performed at several festivals in Ireland and the United Kingdom, including Reading and Leeds Festivals, Cois Fharraige and a headline slot at Indie-pendence. Aaagh! was released in the United Kingdom on 15 October 2007. In January 2008, Republic of Loose were one of the acts who recorded "The Ballad of Ronnie Drew" at Dublin's Windmill Lane Studios; the sessions led to a meeting with Sinéad O'Connor, with whom the band recorded and released a duet which was then performed live at the 2008 Meteor Awards the following month.

=== Vol IV: Johnny Pyro and the Dance of Evil ===
"The Steady Song" (2008)
Sample of "The Steady Song"—taken from the 2008 album Vol IV: Johnny Pyro and the Dance of Evil, this is the band's most successful and highest impacting release in the Irish Singles Chart to date.

On 27 March 2008, Republic of Loose announced the track list and title for their third album. Vol IV: Johnny Pyro and the Dance of Evil was released in May 2008, featuring contributions from Sinéad O'Connor, rapper Styles P and hip hoppers Millionaire Boyz. In the run-up to the release, the band uploaded free downloadable songs to their MySpace profile, including b-sides, live tracks and songs from Aaagh!. Vol IV: Johnny Pyro and the Dance of Evil spent more than three months in the top thirty of the Irish Albums Chart, spawning the successful singles, "I Like Music" and "The Steady Song", the latter their highest chart performer to date, having peaked at number twelve and stayed in the charts for thirteen weeks. Mick Pyro has described Vol IV: Johnny Pyro and the Dance of Evil as the first album the band feel proud of.

In support of the album's release, the band embarked on a small national tour and received an invitation to perform a sell-out month-long residency at The Dublin Academy for four consecutive Fridays, thus ending their habit of playing Dublin only once per year. This involved two-hour sets featuring new material and duets with Sinéad O'Connor—on her song "Nothing Compares 2 U"—and Damien Dempsey—on the Thin Lizzy song "Dancing in the Moonlight". The Academy residency led to a Meteor Award nomination for Best Irish Live Performance the following year and they would return for another performance at the same venue that September. A couple were engaged as part of a BBC television series prior to the Sunday evening appearance of Republic of Loose on the O2 Stage at Oxegen 2008— a performance which also featured collaborator Styles P— whilst the band also performed for several journalists backstage. They performed a DJ set at Castlepalooza before headlining Solas Festival on 17 August 2008. Republic of Loose featured on Today FM's The Ray D'Arcy Show's charity album Even Better Than the Disco Thing released in December 2008, finishing off the year with three shows in Cork.

Republic of Loose were one of several acts to perform cover versions at a show in The Academy titled "Inspirations", held in honour of the actor Paul Newman's Irish charity in February 2009. In June 2009, the band were part of a collaboration of musicians calling themselves The Troublemakers who recorded a cover version of the Horslips song "Trouble with a Capital T" for charity. The recording session was part of The Raw Sessions and the song was performed by The Troublemakers on The Late Late Show. The band performed on the Heineken Green Spheres Stage at Oxegen 2009 before supporting U2 during one of their U2 360° Tour concert dates at Croke Park in July 2009. Republic of Loose participated in the international celebration of the 250th birthday of Guinness—known as Arthur's Day— which took place on 24 September 2009.

=== Bounce at the Devil ===
In 2009 Brez and Deco left the band and were replaced by Da'Rock and Da'ragh. July 2010, Republic of Loose returned to Oxegen. Their fourth album, Bounce at the Devil, was released later that year and led to an appearance on The Late Late Show. The album, recorded in Baltimore, "blends a myriad of influences -- from plastic soul to the sort of 'big hair' rock of the 80s", according to Irish Independent reviewer John Meagher. Entertainment.ie's Jenny Mulligan describes it as good craic but occasionally bordering on obnoxious.

== Influences, praise and style ==
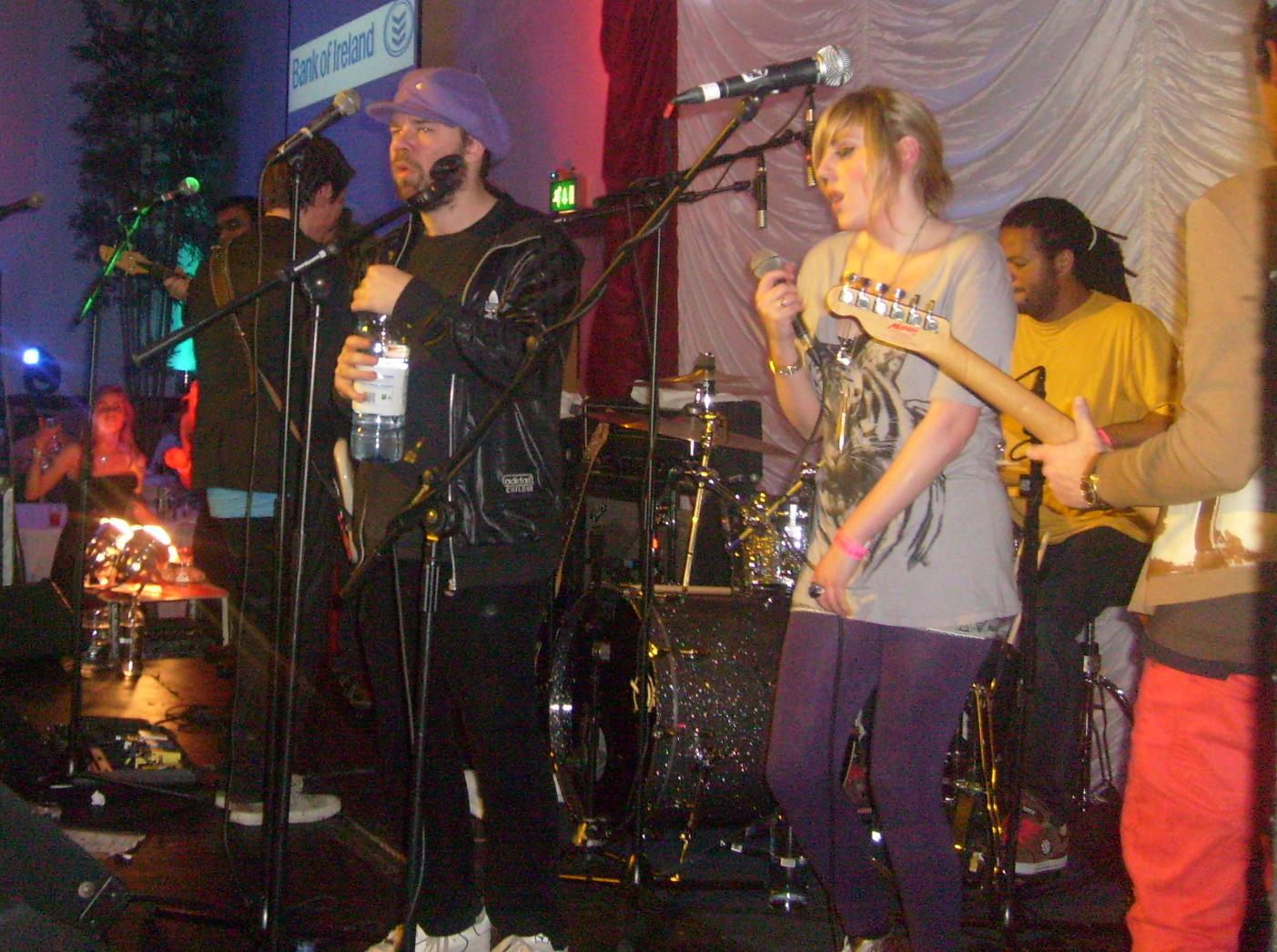
Republic of Loose in Galway, Ireland

Republic of Loose's genre has been defined by various sources as blues, funk, metal, R'n'B, pop, rock and soul. They are influenced by acts such as Bobby Brown, James Brown, Al Green, Howlin' Wolf, Michael Jackson, Prince and The Rolling Stones. They perform as a six-piece band complete with backing singers. The chant, "Loose! Loose Loose!", is commonly heard from the crowd during their performances.

Republic of Loose have earned the admiration of several musicians. Damien Dempsey called them the "best band in Ireland" after performing alongside them. Sinéad O'Connor, in an e-mail to the Irish Independent, asked to become a member of what she described as "simply the best Irish band ever". Bono has described them as "sophisticated soul bootboys", "trailblazers" and proclaimed that "the Celtic Twilight turned into Celtic soul with Van Morrison, then Republic of Loose grabbed the Celtic Tiger by the tail, swung it around their heads and threw it out the window into the cosmos". Snow Patrol's Gary Lightbody, who called them "the best band in the country this year [2007] and for many years to come". Snow Patrol have also remixed "Comeback Girl". Praise has come from other musicians too, including Jake Shears of Scissor Sisters. Marcus Russell, manager of Oasis, is reported as having called Republic of Loose the "most exciting new band" since Oasis. Novelist Irvine Welsh has referred to "Comeback Girl" as "one of the greatest songs ever recorded". Actress Mischa Barton is also a fan.

Paul Lester, writing in British newspaper The Guardian in July 2007, described Republic of Loose as an "Irish OutKast" to be filed next to Danny Wilson, Hall & Oates and N.E.R.D and least likely to be compared to The Pogues. John Meagher, writing in the Irish Independent in April 2008, said the band were "out of step entirely with prevailing trends [...] almost like they stopped listening to music after hearing the young Prince and early Dexys Midnight Runners". Vocalist Mick Pyro has commented that there are very few musicians performing "authentic modern soul" and that the band's aim is to "combine the energy of the New York Dolls with the funk and soul qualities of The Roots". When writing a piece on The Script in August 2008, Brian Boyd of The Irish Times claimed that they were "as un-Irish sounding as The Republic of Loose [sic]". Internationally, they have established fan bases in London and New York City and have achieved regular airplay on Los Angeles radio in the United States, as well as France, Indonesia and the Philippines. Bunim/Murray Productions has licensed their music for use on American television. They have, however, refused several indie contracts in the United States.

== Discography ==
=== Albums ===
Year	Album details	Chart peaks		Certifications (sales thresholds)
Year	Album details	IRL	UK	Certifications (sales thresholds)
2004	This is the Tomb of the Juice: Released: 21 June 2004; Label: Big Cat Records	35	—	
2006	Aaagh!: Released: 7 April 2006; Label: Loaded Dice Records	2	—	
2008	Vol IV: Johnny Pyro and the Dance of Evil: Released: 2 May 2008; Label: Loaded Dice Records	6	—	IRL Gold
2010	Bounce at the Devil: Released: 8 October 2010; Label: Fish Don't Fear Nets Records	10	—	
"—" denotes a release that did not chart.

=== Singles ===
From "This Is The Tomb of the Juice"

- Girl I'm Gonna Fuck You Up
- Hold Up
- Tell More Lies

From "Aaagh!"

- Comeback Girl (IRE #19)
- You Know It (IRE #22)
- Shame (IRE #20)
- Break / The Translation (IRE #29)
- The Idiots

From "Vol IV: Johnny Pyro and the Dance of Evil"

- I Like Music (IRE #41)
- The Steady Song (IRE #12)
- The Ritual
- Awful Cold

From "Bounce At the Devil"

- The Man
- 99 (feat. Bo Starks)
- The Blah Bounce

Non-album singles

- They Pay For Love (2012)
- Thinking of You (2013) IRE #16
- The Punishment (2013)

== Awards ==
=== Choice Music Prize ===
Republic of Loose's second album Aaagh! was nominated for the Choice Music Prize, an award won by The Divine Comedy for the album Victory for the Comic Muse. The band performed at the award ceremony in Vicar Street on 28 February 2007. Surprise was expressed within the industry when they were not nominated again for the 2009 award.

Year	Nominee / work	Award	Result
2007	Aaagh!	Irish Album of the Year 2006	Nominated

=== Meteor Music Awards ===
Republic of Loose won the Hope for 2004 award at the 2004 Meteor Awards. They were nominated in the Best Irish Band category at 2007 Meteor Awards.

Republic of Loose were nominated in the Best Irish Band and Best Irish Live Performance categories at the 2009 Meteor Awards. They lost to The Script and The Blizzards in those respective categories.

In addition to this, they have performed at both the 2006 and 2008 awards ceremonies, the latter of which involved a duet with Sinéad O'Connor on the Curtis Mayfield song "We People Who Are Darker Than Blue".

Year	Nominee / work	Award	Result
2004	Republic of Loose	Hope for 2004	Won
2007	Republic of Loose	Best Irish Band	Nominated
2009	Republic of Loose	Best Irish Band	Nominated
2009	The Academy	Best Irish Live Performance	Nominated
