= Aaagh! =

Studio album by Republic of Loose
- Released: 7 April 2006
- Recorded: Apollo Studios, Dublin; Grouse Lodge Co. Westmeath
- Genre: Rock, Funk
- Length: 55:20
- Label: Loaded Dice Records
- Producer: Gareth Mannix

Republic of Loose chronology
This is the Tomb of the Juice (2004)	Aaagh! (2006)	Vol IV: Johnny Pyro and the Dance of Evil (2008)

Professional ratings
Review scores
Source	Rating
Rocklouder	3/5 stars
AllMusic	4.5/5 stars
Entertainment.ie	4/5 stars
Sputnikmusic	4.5/5 stars

Aaagh! is the second album by the Irish funk-rock band Republic of Loose. It was released on 7 April 2006. At a cost of €70,000 to make, it was their most expensive album to date. Sunday Tribune journalist Una Mullally called it "one of the most original and progressive Irish albums ever made". Aaagh! reached number two in the Irish Albums Chart, going platinum in the process, it received regular airplay on Irish radio and produced five singles, including "The Idiots", a song about Mick Pyro's former girlfriend which also features her on vocals. "Break" made top forty singles chart in South Africa, and was temporarily banned by South African radio station 5fm, when a female DJ declared on air that it promoted anal sex without contraception, a comment which led to several complaints from listeners.

The band's 2006 summer tour included a performance where fans danced outside despite "the lashing rain" at Oxegen 2006, with the Irish Independent's Larissa Nolan saying "their scheduling on the main stage was a testament to just how big their army of fans is", and Castlepalooza. In 2007, Republic of Loose performed at several festivals in Ireland and the United Kingdom, including Reading and Leeds Festivals, Cois Fharraige and a headline slot at Indie-pendence. Aaagh! was released in the United Kingdom on 15 October 2007. In January 2008, the singles "Comeback Girl" (July 2005) and "You Know It" (October 2005) had become Irish radio hits some months prior to the album's release. "Shame" (released in late February 2006) also pre-dated the album.

"The Idiots" and the double A-Side of "The Translation / Break" were the other tracks that were released as singles. The album was nominated for the Choice Music Prize in 2007.

== Track listing ==
1. "Intro" – 1.29
2. "Aaagh!" – 3.50
3. "The Translation" – 3.34
4. "Comeback Girl" – 3.58
5. "Rubberbands" – 0.12
6. "Break!" – 3.53
7. "I'm Greedy" – 3.31
8. "Somebody Screamed" – 3.51
9. "All Mine" – 3.42
10. "Mary Caine" – 3.57
11. "Shame" – 3.52
12. "The Idiots" – 4.54
13. "Ya Know" – 0.46
14. "You Know It" – 3.22
15. "Na Na Na Na Na Na" – 2.49
16. "Parasite" – 4.03
17. "The Evening" – 3.46
