= Vol IV: Johnny Pyro and the Dance of Evil =

Studio album by Republic of Loose
- Released: May 2, 2008
- Genres: Rock, funk
- Length: 77:07
- Label: Loaded Dice Records
- Producer: Gareth Mannix

Republic of Loose chronology
Aaagh! (2006)	Vol IV: Johnny Pyro and the Dance of Evil (2008)	Bounce at the Devil (2010)

Professional ratings
Review scores
Source	Rating
AllMusic	3/5 stars
Sputnikmusic	3/5 stars

Vol IV: Johnny Pyro and the Dance of Evil is the third album by the Irish funk-rock band Republic of Loose. Released on May 2, 2008, it had achieved gold status in the band's native Ireland by the end of the year.

The album spawned four singles : "I Like Music", "The Steady Song" (the band's biggest hit to date), "The Ritual" and "Awful Cold".

== Track listing ==
1. "Got" - 6.00
2. "Poquito" - 4.04
3. "The Steady Song" feat. Isabel Reyes-Feeney - 3.13
4. "23 Things I Don't Like" - 4.28
5. "13 Shots" - 5.43
6. "I.R.I.I.S.H." feat. The Millionaire Boyz and The Mighty Stef - 5.26
7. "You Do Me" - 3.49
8. "The Ritual" feat. Annie Tierney - 4.17
9. "Awful Cold" feat. Isabel Reyes-Feeney - 6.07
10. "Drop" feat. Emily Rose - 3.25
11. "I Like Music" feat. Styles P - 5.02
12. "When I'm Gone" - 4.37
13. "The Telephone" feat. Sinéad O'Connor - 5.50
14. "The Telephone Part 2 (Reprise)" feat. Eve Ill Jones, Tara McCormick and Annie Tierney - 3.39
15. "My Brain" - 6.53
16. "I Like Music" - 4.33

"The Steady Song"
