= The Academy (music venue) =

Music venue in Dublin, Ireland

Coordinates: 53.348028°N 6.262°W

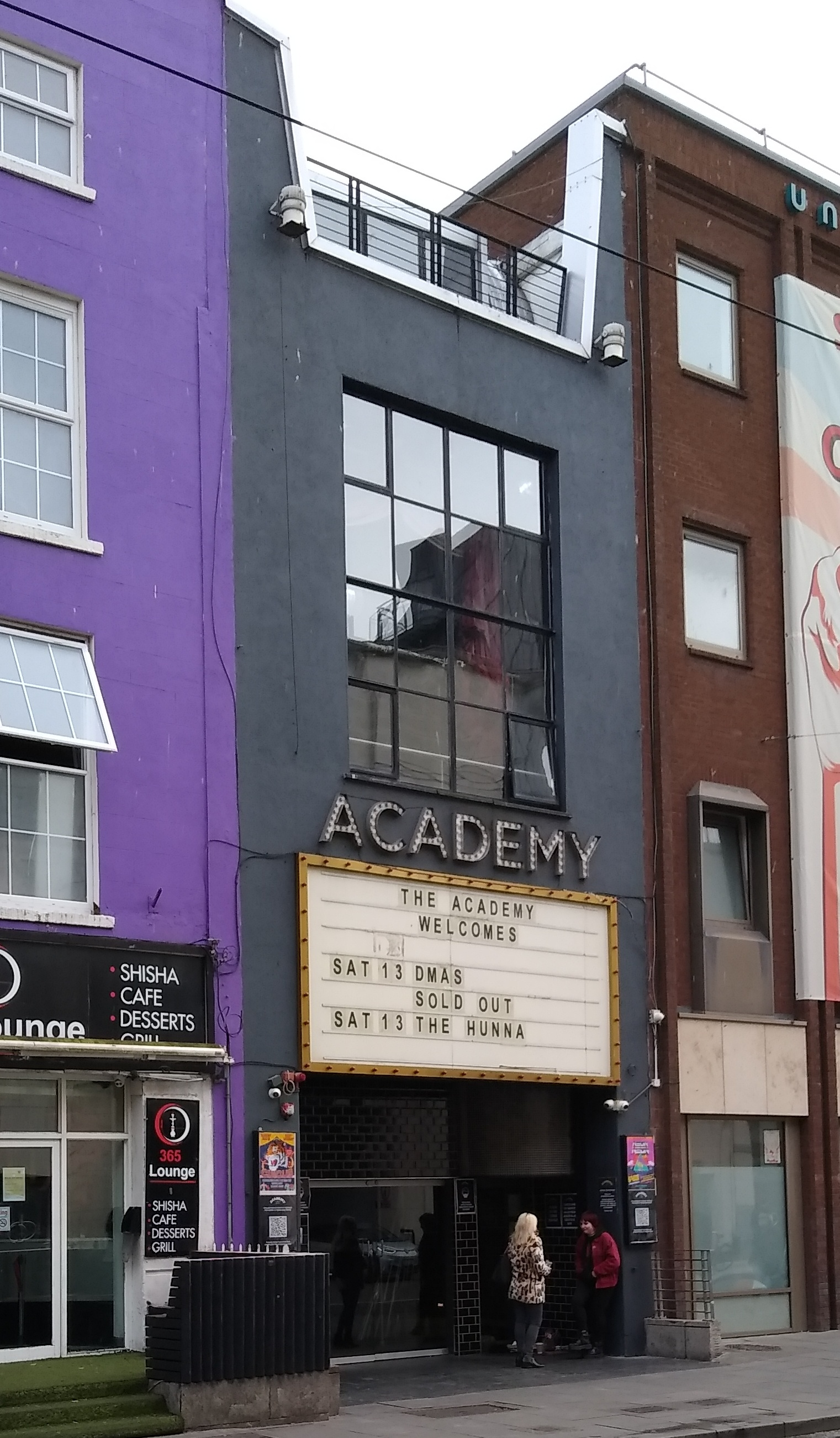
The Academy

Logo of The Academy in Dublin

The Academy is a music venue located in Dublin, Ireland. It consists of four floors, each for differing music tastes. The Academy was the venue where The Killers performed an intimate show in August 2008, one night before a performance in Marlay Park. Others to have played the venue in 2008 include Black Kids, Sam Sparro, The Futureheads and Stereophonics. Staind, Lily Allen, Maxïmo Park, Gomez, The Cribs, Buzzcocks, and Calvin Harris played in 2009.

The venue screened the 2009 UEFA Champions League Final before a performance by The Maccabees on 27 May 2009. The Coronas played the venue on 4 June, with support acts being Dirty Epics and The Chakras. James played an Oxegen 2009 warm-up show in The Academy on 8 July. Fight Like Apes performed inside a specially constructed wrestling ring at an end of year show in 2009.

== Design ==
The Main Room has a standing capacity of 650 people with capacity for additional 200 people on the upper balcony.

The Green Room is located on The Academy's ground floor and has a capacity of 550 people. It has a low slung ceiling and is used for live performances from electronic acts and DJs.

The Academy 2 is found in the basement. It is a live room for smaller bands, comedy shows and record launches, with a capacity of 250.

The Chamber is a private VIP room which is available on request.

== Awards ==
=== Meteor Music Awards ===
A performance by the band Republic of Loose at The Academy was nominated in the Best Irish Live Performance at the Meteor Music Awards in 2009.

| Year | Nominee / work | Award | Result |
|---|---|---|---|
| 2009 | Republic of Loose | Best Irish Live Performance | Nominated |
