= Irish Music Rights Organisation =

Irish copyright collection and performing rights society

- Founded: 1988
- Headquarters: Ireland
- Key people: Eleanor McEvoy (chairperson since 2017)
- Website: https://www.imro.ie/

The Irish Music Rights Organisation (IMRO) is a national performance rights organisation based in Ireland. It administers the performing right in copyright music on behalf of its members (who are Irish songwriters, composers and music publishers) and on behalf of the songwriters, composers and music publishers of the international overseas societies that are affiliated to it. As of December 2022, IMRO had over 17,000 members.

== History ==
IMRO was founded in 1988, initially as a subsidiary of the Performing Right Society (PRS) in the UK. It became independent of PRS in 1996.

During 1996, IMRO was described as described as being engaged in a "dogged pursuit of performance royalties in relation to primary schools". IMRO stated that the use of copyrighted music in public schools for events like plays, concerts, or dances meant that each school should pay a licensing fee. Following the controversy, a compromise was reached with reduced fees to be paid.

IMRO is also involved in the promotion of music in Ireland, and it sponsors a number of song contests, music festivals, performances, seminars, workshops, research projects and awards. The IMRO Radio Awards, for example, have taken place every year since 2000.

As of January 2016, IMRO handled the collection and distribution of royalties covered by the repertoire of PPI (Phonographic Performance Ireland) through a joint licensing scheme.

A 2019 article in Hot Press stated that in "advocating and campaigning for Irish music creators, IMRO plays an essential role not just in the domestic music industry, but in Irish culture as a whole".

In January 2026, IMRO partnered with The Ivors Academy to establish an Irish branch of the Academy with former Arts Minister Catherine Martin as its Head of Policy.

== Operation ==
A public performance of copyright music takes place when that music is used anywhere outside of the domestic environment. IMRO's function is to collect and distribute royalties arising from the public performance of copyright works. Music users such as broadcasters, venues and businesses must pay for their use of copyright music by way of a blanket licence fee. IMRO collects these monies and distributes them to the songwriters, composers and music publishers who created the songs. The monies earned by copyright owners in this way are known as public performance royalties. IMRO itself is a not-for-profit organisation.
