= Aoife Scott =

Irish singer songwriter

- Origin: Dublin, Ireland
- Partner: Andy Meaney
- Website: aoifescott.com
- Mother: Frances Black

Aoife Scott is an Irish singer-songwriter from Dublin, Ireland. She was a finalist in the Liet International song contest for minority languages in 2011.

== Career ==
Scott's first album was released in 2016 and entitled Carry The Day. Scott has performed on RTÉ's The Late Late Show. She has toured in the US and UK.

Her recording of "Grace" with cousins Danny O'Reilly and Róisín O, as part of the Centenary concert, topped the Irish iTunes chart in 2016. Her solo single "All Along the Wild Atlantic Way" also topped the chart.

Her album Homebird, a Radio 1 "Album of the week", was released in January 2020.

Scott was a guest judge on TG4's Réalta agus Gaolta talent show.

== Personal life ==
Aoife is a Gaeilgeoir (Irish language speaker).

A part of the extended Black Family singers, Scott is the daughter of singer Frances Black and the sister of solo artist and producer Eoghan Scott. As of July 2023, Scott has been in a relationship with musician Andy Meaney since 2014.
