= 2010 Meteor Awards =

Irish music awards

- Date: 19 February 2010
- Location: RDS Simmonscourt
- Presented by: Amanda Byram
- Website: www.themeteors.ie

Television/radio coverage
- Network: RTÉ Two

The 2010 Meteor Music Awards ceremony took place on Friday 19 February 2010 in Dublin. They were presented by Amanda Byram. The launch took place in La Stampa on 7 January 2010, and was attended by The Coronas and Danny O'Donoghue from The Script.

Bell X1, Christy Moore, Florence and the Machine and U2 each received three nominations. U2 received no awards to the surprise of The Coronas and The Script who beat them in two of the three categories. Westlife won Best Irish Pop Act for the tenth consecutive year. The list of performing artists on the night included international acts such as Dizzee Rascal, Pixie Lott, Paolo Nutini, The Script, The Temper Trap and Westlife. Snow Patrol were also announced but later cancelled their scheduled performance.

The event had sold out by early February. It was broadcast on RTÉ Two on 21 February 2010, at 21:00.

== Performances ==
The first announcements were:

- The Coronas
- Florence and the Machine
- Pixie Lott
- Paolo Nutini
- The Script
- ~~Snow Patrol~~
- Westlife

Later announcements included:

- Brian Kennedy and the Dublin Gospel Choir
- Bell X1
- The Temper Trap
- Dizzee Rascal

=== Cancelled performance ===
Snow Patrol announced an inability to perform at the 2010 Meteor Awards after frontman Gary Lightbody broke his jaw.

== Winners and nominees ==
The nominations were announced on January 7, 2010.

=== Public voting categories ===
==== Best Radio DJ – National ====
- Ray Foley – Today FM
  - Ian Dempsey – Today FM
  - Damien Farrelly – RTÉ 2fm
  - Tony Fenton – Today FM
  - Larry Gogan – RTÉ 2fm
  - Dan Hegarty – RTÉ 2fm

==== Best Radio DJ – Regional ====
- Leigh Doyle – BEAT
  - Jim & Niamh – FM104
  - KC & Lenny – Red FM
  - Michelle McMahon – Spin South West
  - Jon Richards – Galway Bay FM
  - Shona Ryan – SPIN 1038

==== Best Irish Band ====
- Snow Patrol
  - Bell X1
  - The Coronas
  - Delorentos
  - U2

==== Best Irish Male ====
- Christy Moore
  - Colin Devlin
  - Jerry Fish
  - Jack L
  - Mundy

==== Best Irish Female ====
- Wallis Bird
  - Julie Feeney
  - Valerie Francis
  - Laura Izibor
  - Dolores O'Riordan

==== Best Irish Pop Act ====
- Westlife
  - Delorentos
  - Laura Izibor
  - The Blizzards
  - The Script

==== Best Irish Album ====
- The Coronas – Tony Was an Ex-Con
  - Bell X1 – Blue Lights on the Runway
  - The Duckworth Lewis Method – The Duckworth Lewis Method
  - Snow Patrol – Up to Now
  - U2 – No Line on the Horizon

==== Best Irish Live Performance ====
- The Script – Oxegen 2009
  - Bell X1
  - Christy Moore
  - Snow Patrol
  - U2

=== Non-Public voting categories ===
==== Best Folk/Traditional ====
- Sharon Shannon
  - Kathleen Loughnane
  - Kíla with Bruno Coulais
  - Christy Moore
  - Mairéad Ní Mhaonaigh

==== Best International Band ====
- Florence and the Machine
  - The Black Eyed Peas
  - Green Day
  - Kasabian
  - Muse

==== Best International Male ====
- Michael Bublé
  - Jay Z
  - Morrissey
  - Paolo Nutini
  - Bruce Springsteen

==== Best International Female ====
- Lady Gaga
  - Lily Allen
  - Little Boots
  - Pixie Lott
  - Taylor Swift

==== Best International Album ====
- Paolo Nutini – Sunny Side Up
  - Kasabian – West Ryder Pauper Lunatic Asylum
  - Florence and the Machine – Lungs
  - Mumford & Sons – Sigh No More
  - Lady Gaga – The Fame Monster

==== Best International Live Performance ====
- Leonard Cohen
  - Coldplay
  - Florence and the Machine
  - Bruce Springsteen
  - Take That

== Special awards ==
=== Lifetime achievement award ===
- Brian Kennedy

=== Humanitarian Award ===
- Niall Mellon

=== Industry Award ===
- The Marquess Conyngham, organiser of the concerts at Slane Castle.
  - Presented by Adam Clayton

== Most Promising New Artist of the Year ==
As part of the 2010 Meteor Ireland Music Awards organisers developed a new award called Most Promising New Artist of 2010. This new award was designed for any up-and-coming artist or band who were unsigned. The award itself is differentiated from the Hope of 2010 award in that the Hope award is given to an artist or band already signed to a mainstream or independent record label. An artist or band who would like to be part of the Most Promising New Artist of 2010 nominations had to submit relevant particulars before January 11, 2010. The winner of the award is expected to perform at the event, appear at Oxegen 2010 and have 150 copies of their debut single released, including artwork.

Nominations announced on February 5, 2010:

- Amasis
  - Ever27
  - Jody Has A Hitlist
  - Colm Lynch
  - Susie Soho
  - Three Plus Me
  - Sean Dempsey

== Multiple nominations ==
Bell X1, Christy Moore, Florence and the Machine (from the UK), Snow Patrol and U2 received three nominations each.

3 nominations

- Bell X1
- Christy Moore
- Florence and the Machine
- Snow Patrol
- U2

2 nominations

- Bruce Springsteen
- The Coronas
- Delorentos
- Kasabian
- Lady Gaga
- Laura Izibor
- Paolo Nutini
