= Holy Ground =

Holy ground is a location which is deemed to be sacred or hallowed.

Holy Ground may refer to:

== Music ==
=== Albums ===
- Holy Ground: NYC Live with the Wordless Music Orchestra, by Mono, 2010
- The Holy Ground (album), a 1993 album by Mary Black
- Holy Ground, a 2021 album by The Dead Daisies

=== Songs ===
- "Holy Ground" (BigXthaPlug and Jessie Murph song), 2025
- "Holy Ground" (Taylor Swift song), 2012
- "The Holy Ground", a traditional Irish song
- "Holy Ground", a song by a-ha from the 2005 album Analogue
- "Holy Ground", a song by Davido from the album A Better Time
- "Holy Ground", a song by DJ Khaled from the 2019 album Father of Asahd
- "Holy Ground", a 1994 song by Geron Davis

== Other uses ==
- Hibernian Park, a Scottish stadium nicknamed "The Holy Ground"
- Easter Road, a Scottish stadium nicknamed "The Holy Ground"

== See also ==
- Battle of Holy Ground, or Battle of Econochaca, between the United States militia and the Red Stick Creek Indians during the Creek War 1813
