= Alcoholic Beverage Federation of Ireland =

The Alcoholic Beverage Federation of Ireland is an Irish trade association group based in Dublin. It is a member of Ibec.

It includes:

- Irish Brewers Association
- Irish Cider Association
- Irish Spirits Association
- Irish Whiskey Association
- Irish Wine Association

It extends to Northern Ireland and lobbies the British government.

It lobbies on behalf of the drink industry. In October 2018 it complained that cancer warnings on alcohol labels would have a “devastating” impact on visitor centres, after the passing of the Public Health (Alcohol) Bill through the Dáil and that the Minister for Health Simon Harris had failed to engage with the drinks industry.

It says that a 'no deal' Brexit would be disastrous for the drinks industry.
