= Centenary (concert) =

Centenary was a concert for television produced by RTÉ to mark the 100-year anniversary of Ireland's 1916 Rising. It was directed by Cillian Fennell.

== Overview ==
The 85-minute-long show, which was broadcast live from the Bord Gáis Energy Theatre in Dublin, told the story of Ireland's centenary in 18 chapters of song, dance and poetry. In total 600 people – 21 choirs, 18 dancers, 10 actors, six aerial dancers, the RTÉ Concert Orchestra and 80 crew members were involved in the production. The show had a budget €2.5 Million.

The show featured performances by Imelda May, Jack L, Gavin James, The High Kings, Colm Wilkinson, Danny O'Reilly of the Coronas, Aoife Scott, Iarla Ó Lionáird, Sibéal Ní Chasaide, Sharon Shannon, Dónal Lunny, John Sheahan, Celine Byrne, Seo Linn and dance troupes Fidget Feet and CoisCéim. As well as the main venue, there were musical performances from the historically significant locations of Kilmainham Gaol and the Garden of Remembrance.

== Video Graphics ==
The various performances that took place during the concert were each accompanied by video graphics throughout. The video graphics featured during the concert were created and displayed by a French company called Cosmo Audio/ Visual (AV). During the sections of the concert that took place in the Bord Gais Energy Theatre, these graphics were displayed on the floor and back wall of the stage. This was through the use of Light-Emitting Diode (LED) technology.

The graphics shown during the concert served a similar purpose to the stage’s lighting – establishing the colour scheme and reflecting the thematic aspect of each segment. As such, the contents of these graphics varied widely throughout the 18 chapters of the concert. Abstract moving designs would display on the LED screens during the concert’s dance sequences, before changing to theatrical set backgrounds during scenes of historical re-enactment. The graphics also at times featured video footage, photographs, and politically driven artwork sourced from early 20th-century Ireland.

== Reception ==
The show was overwhelmingly positively received, with the Irish Independent calling it 'the finest of what we are – tremendously entertaining and genuinely affecting', describing reaction to ni Chasaide's performance as 'phenomenal'. The Irish Examiner described 'breathtaking performances from Danny O'Reilly, Roisin O and Imelda May as well as Seo Linn [sic]' and that 'viewers felt goosebumps', comparing the show with Riverdance.

The show was praised in many reviews for its demonstration of patriotism. Website Entertainment.ie noted in its review that Centenary featured "immense national pride". The website’s review also applauded the inclusion of Irish President Michael D. Higgins in the event, calling his speech "powerful, emotive". President Higgins' speech is further praised by the Irish Film & Television Network (IFTN), as he chose to pay tribute to "all the Irish rebels who died during the Rising in both Irish and English".
