= Frances Black =

Irish singer and politician (born 1960)

Senator Frances Black
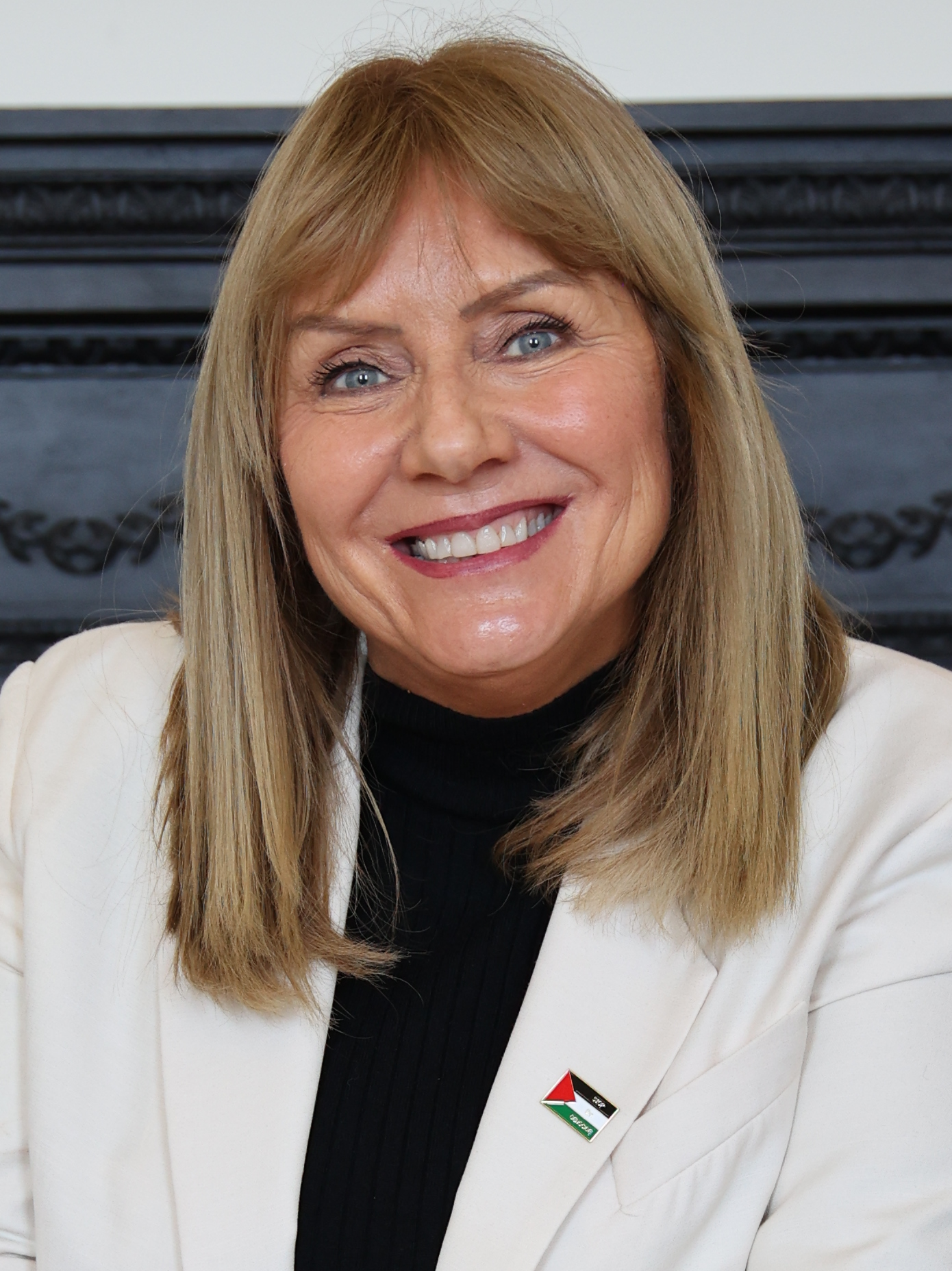
- Black in 2025

Senator
- Incumbent
- Assumed office 8 June 2016
- Constituency: Industrial and Commercial Panel

Personal details
- Born: 25 June 1960 (age 66) Dublin, Ireland
- Party: Independent
- Other political affiliations: Civil Engagement group
- Spouse: Brian Allen
- Children: 2, including Aoife Scott
- Relatives: Mary Black (sister)
- Education: All Hallows College
- Website: Official site – Politics

Frances Black
- Genres: Celtic; folk
- Occupations: Singer, addiction counsellor
- Years active: 1988–present
- Website: Official site

Frances Patricia Black (born 25 June 1960) is an Irish singer and politician. She came to prominence in the late 1980s when she began to play with her family's traditional and contemporary Irish music band, the Black Family.

Black was elected to Seanad Éireann as an independent senator in 2016 for the Industrial and Commercial Panel.

== Background ==
Black was born in Charlemont Street, Dublin in 1960 into a musical family. She was educated at St Louis High School, Rathmines. Her father Kevin was a keen fiddle player and mandolinist, a plasterer by trade and a native of Rathlin Island, County Antrim. Her mother Patty (from Dublin) used to sing in local dance halls. She is the youngest of five children, having three brothers Shay, Michael and Martin, and one sister, Mary Black, who is also a well-known singer.

== Musical career ==
=== Pre-solo ===
Black's musical career began at 17, when she began singing with her siblings, in her family group, known as The Black Family. She gained confidence in her singing abilities and enhanced her performing skills by joining the band Arcady in 1988 (with De Dannan's Johnny McDonagh, Brendan Larrissey, Patsy Broderick, Seán Keane, Cathal Hayden, Sharon Shannon, and Paul Doyle). They had successes such as "After the Ball". Due to her young family, the gruelling touring schedule was too much for Black, so she decided to leave the group. Black last toured the US with Arcady in August 1992.

Black teamed up with the Newry singer Kieran Goss, and the pair recorded the album Frances Black and Kieran Goss in 1992. One of the songs on the album, "Wall of Tears", was featured on the compilation album A Woman's Heart, which went on to become the biggest-selling Irish album ever, and this, along with the subsequent tour, advanced Black's career in the music industry. Other artists on A Woman's Heart included Eleanor McEvoy, Sharon Shannon, Maura O'Connell, Dolores Keane, and her sister Mary Black, who had achieved international success by then.

=== Solo career ===
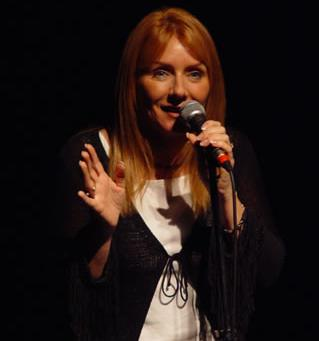
Black in November 2003

Black received rave reviews while on tour in Australia and New Zealand in March 1993 with 20 other Irish artists, in a Guinness celebration of Irish music. This resulted in a record deal from the Irish label Dara Records. She released her first solo album in 1994, Talk to Me. It became an instant hit, selling over 100,000 copies and spending eight weeks at number one in her native Ireland. The album contained four Nanci Griffith-penned songs, one Vince Gill song and John Lennon's "Intuition". However, it was her cover of the Christie Hennessy song, "All the Lies That You Told Me", that received the most attention. Talk to Me was released in the UK and United States also, where she toured in 1994.

Black released her second solo album, The Sky Road, in 1995. She was the recipient of the 'Best Album by a Female' award, by the IRMA. Due to her rising popularity in America, she embarked on her second solo tour there in 1995. Among Ms. Black's most successful singles are re-recordings of Acker Bilk's "Stranger on the Shore" in 1996 and 1997, the Yvonne Elliman-popularized tune "Love Me, Please". 1997 saw the release of Black's album The Smile on Your Face. It contained songs written by numerous Irish, English and American songwriters. The follow-up album was 1998's Don't Get Me Wrong, which was released in the UK under Sony Records and was her fourth solo effort. It once again cemented Ms. Black's reputation as an international performer, becoming as revered as her older sister Mary.

A compilation, The Best of Frances Black, was released in 2001 by Dara-Dolphin Records. The album included 16 tracks from her throughout her career. Her two most recent albums How High the Moon (2003) and This Love Will Carry (2006) have also sold well in Ireland and Black toured the United States in support of the recordings. Her latest compilation, The Essential Frances Black (2008), went platinum, and contained 40 of her most popular songs.

== Addiction and charity work ==
A recovering alcoholic, Black returned to college as a mature student in 2004 and qualified as an addiction counsellor, and did some counselling work at the Rutland Addiction Treatment Centre in Dublin. She established a charity called the Rise Foundation in 2009 which supports family members who have a loved one with an alcohol, drug or gambling problem. Rise runs a number of 10-week family programmes around the country and a one-to-one counselling service for family members who are suffering from stress and anxiety living with a loved one with an addiction problem.

== Political career ==
Black was elected to Seanad Éireann in 2016 in her first political campaign as an independent candidate. She received her nomination from the Independent Broadcasters of Ireland and ran on the Industrial and Commercial Panel. She was a member of the Civil Engagement group in the 25th Seanad. During the 25th Seanad, Black was a member of the Seanad Brexit Committee and the Good Friday Implementation Committee.

In July 2017, Black co-proposed a new bill that proposed to alter the law in Ireland to enable more refugee families to be reunited. The law proposed that "family" in Irish legal terms should include the following when reunifying refugees: grandparent, parent, brother, sister, child, grandchild, ward or guardian of the refugee.

She has called for alcohol not to be sold next to nappies in supermarkets, and helped draft the Public Health (Alcohol) Act 2018 which introduced minimum pricing on Alcohol in Ireland. In January 2018 Black proposed the Occupied Territories Bill, a private member's bill which she described as seeking "to prohibit the import and sales of goods, services and natural resources originating in illegal settlements in occupied territories".

In 2018, Black visited the Gaza Strip and the West Bank. As part of her visit to the West Bank, she travelled with Breaking the Silence, an organisation consisting of former members of the Israeli Defence Forces who are opposed to Israeli settlements there.

In April 2018, NBC's Vivian Salama, on behalf of the politician George Mitchell, personally presented the Arab American Institute Foundation (AAIF)'s Award for Individual Achievement to Black at the 20th annual Kahlil Gibran Spirit of Humanity Awards in Washington. Mitchell made a special video message in praise of Black. The award was in recognition of her work as founder of RISE Foundation and her "tireless efforts on behalf of those struggling with addiction and their families".

She was re-elected at the 2020 Seanad election, and at the 2025 Seanad election.

In March 2025, Black was named among the bookies' favourites as a possible candidate in the 2025 presidential election. Black said she was "open to the conversation".

== Political views ==
As the Chairperson of the Ireland's Future organisation, Black is an advocate for Irish reunification.

Black advocates for Palestinian nationalism and supports the Boycott, Divestment and Sanctions movement against Israel. In January 2018 she tabled the Occupied Territories Bill in the Seanad, to place into Irish law a ban on "trade with and economic support for illegal settlements in territories deemed occupied under international law". The Bill was not enacted before the Seanad was dissolved. A watered-down version of the Bill was included in the subsequent programme for government.

In a 2019 interview, Black cited Clare Daly as someone she admired politically.

== Personal life ==
Black had her first child, Eoghan, when she was 19, and her second child Aoife, when she was 21. Her first marriage ended shortly afterwards, and she is now married to her second husband, Brian Allen. Her daughter Aoife Scott recorded a track on Black's album This Love Will Carry. Aoife is now also a well-known singer and songwriter herself in Ireland after releasing her first solo album Carry the Day. Her son, Eoghan Scott, is also a well-known musician, songwriter and producer in the Irish music scene and holds a degree and doctorate in psychology from DCU.

== Discography ==
- Frances Black and Kieran Goss (1992)
- Talk to Me (1994)
- The Sky Road (1995)
- The Smile on Your Face (1996)
- Don't Get Me Wrong (1998)
- The Best of Frances Black (2000)
- How High the Moon (2003)
- This Love Will Carry (2006)
- The Essential Frances Black (2008)
- Stronger (2013)
