= Far from Here =

Far from Here may refer to:

- "Far from Here", a 2006 song by Marianas Trench from Fix Me
- "Far from Here", a 2009 song by Kendrick Lamar from his self-titled EP
- "Far from Here", a 2009 song by The Coronas from Tony Was an Ex-Con
