= Nessa O'Mahony =

Poet and a freelance teacher and writer

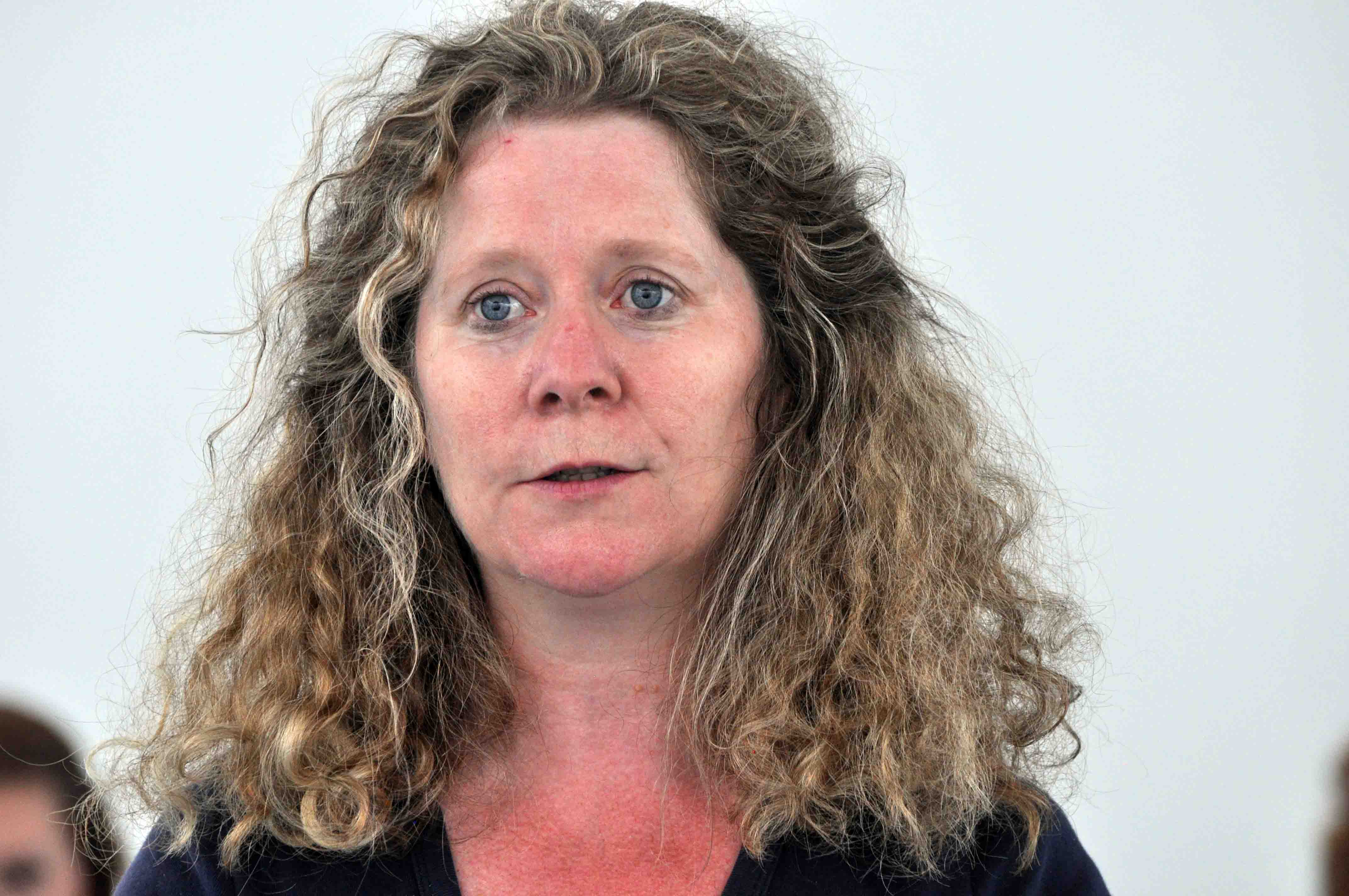
- O'Mahony in 2012
- Born: Dublin, Ireland
- Education: University College Dublin; University of East Anglia; University of Wales Bangor
- Occupations: Poet, novelist, writer, teacher
- Writing career
- Years active: 1994–present
- Genres: Poetry, fiction
- Notable works: Bar Talk; Trapping a Ghost; In Sight of Home; Her Father's Daughter; The Branchman; The Hollow Woman on the Island; Dodder Daughter
- Notable awards: National Women's Poetry Competition (1997); Arts Council of Ireland literature bursary (2004, 2011, 2018)
- Website: nessaomahony.com

Nessa O'Mahony is an Irish poet and a freelance teacher and writer.

== Life and work ==
Born in Dublin, she was educated in St Louis High School, Rathmines before going on to University College Dublin to study English. She was a recipient of the Mary Colum Award for being the highest-placed female student in English Literature for the BA in 1984. O'Mahony worked as a journalist in RTÉ Aertel and Lafferty Publications, before switching to public relations with roles in the Irish Insurance Federation and Arts Council (Ireland), where she was Head of Public Affairs (1999-2002).

She began writing poetry in 1994. She published her first collection of poems, Bar Talk, in 1999, and was a regular presenter on the radio show Writers Inc. Anna Livia FM from 1997 to 1999. She returned to full-time education in 2002, completing a master's in creative writing at the University of East Anglia (2003) and a PhD in creative and critical writing at the University of Wales Bangor in 2006.

Since then she has won awards for her poetry, worked as assistant editor of the UK literary journal Orbis, and teaches workshops on poetry and writing through a number of venues including the Open University.

Her works have been translated into several languages and published across the world. She lives in Rathfarnham.

== Awards and bursaries ==
- 1996 Joint winner of the Kerry International Summer School Poetry Competition
- 1997 National Women's Poetry Competition
- shortlisted Patrick Kavanagh Prize
- shortlisted Hennessy Literature Awards
- 2004, 2011 and 2018 Awarded an Arts Council of Ireland literature bursary
- 2005 Simba Gill Fellowship
- 2007 Artists’ bursary from South Dublin County Council
- Artist in residence at the John Hume Institute for Global Irish Studies at University College Dublin

== Criticism ==
Novelist Joseph O'Connor (In Sight of Home) :

‘a moving, powerful and richly pleasurable read, audaciously imagined and achieved’

Poet Tess Gallagher (Her Father’s Daughter) :

‘words are her witching sticks and she employs them with beautiful, engaging intent, the better to make present what has preceded and what approaches.’

== Bibliography ==
- Bar Talk (Italics Press, 1999)
- Trapping a Ghost (Bluechrome, 2005)
- In Sight of Home(Salmon, 2009)
- Her Father's Daughter (Salmon, 2014)
- The Branchman (Arlen House, 2018)
- The Hollow Woman on the Island (Salmon, 2019)
- Dodder Daughter (Salmon, 2026)

Co-editions

- Eavan Boland. Inside History (with Dr. Siobhán Campbell) (Arlen House 2016)
- Metamorphic. 21st century poets respond to Ovid (with Paul Munden) (Recent Work Press 2017)
