= Closer to You (The Coronas album) =

Closer To You

Studio album by The Coronas
- Released: 11 November 2011
- Genre: Indie rock, Pop rock
- Producer: Tony Hoffer

The Coronas chronology
Tony Was an Ex-Con (2009)	Closer To You (2011)	The Long Way (2014)

Singles from Closer To You
- 1. "Addicted To Progress" Released: 4 November 2011; 2. "Mark My Words" Released: 4 February 2012; 3. "Dreaming Again" Released: 10 September 2012; 4. "Closer To You" Released: June 29, 2012

Closer To You is the third album by the Irish indie act The Coronas, released in November 2011. It went straight into the Irish Indie Chart at number one, making number three in the overall chart. The album was produced by Tony Hoffer. Its lead single "Addicted to Progress" received more radio play in Ireland than any of the band's previous singles, topping Today FM's playlist chart for three consecutive weeks in December 2011.

== Track listing ==
All tracks are written by The Coronas

No.	Title	Length
1.	"What You Think You Know"	3:17
2.	"Mark My Words"	3:41
3.	"Closer to You"	3:47
4.	"Dreaming Again"	3:27
5.	"Blind Wil Lead the Blind"	3:53
6.	"Addicted to Progress"	2:53
7.	"My God"	4:13
8.	"Dreaming Again, pt.2 (Wait for You)"	4:17
9.	"Write to Me"	3:49
10.	"Different Ending"	3:41
11.	"Make It Happen"	3:51
Total length:		40:55

== Chart positions ==
Chart (2011)	Peak position
Irish Independent Albums Chart	1
