= Ita Daly =

Irish novelist

- Born: 1945 (age 80–81); County Leitrim, Ireland
- Education: University College Dublin
- Occupation: Writer
- Spouse: David Marcus
- Children: 1

Ita Daly (born 1945) is an Irish author of five novels for adults, two for children and a collection of short stories.

== Biography ==
Ita Daly was born in 1945 in Drumshanbo, County Leitrim, Ireland. She was the daughter of a civil servant. She was educated in the St Louis High School, Rathmines, Dublin and then went on to study English and Spanish at University College Dublin. She graduated with a Bachelor of Arts, Master of Arts and Higher Diploma in Education. She worked as a teacher for eleven years at a secondary school in Dublin.

Daly was married to writer David Marcus and in 2016 published a memoir of their life together, I'll Drop You a Line: A Life With David Marcus. She has one daughter. She left teaching when her daughter was born. She lives in Dublin.

She is a member of Aosdána.

== Awards ==
- In both 1972 and 1976 she was awarded the Hennessy Literary Award
- In 1975 she won the short story contest in The Irish Times

== Bibliography ==
- The Lady with the Red Shoes (1980)
- Ellen (1986)
- A Singular Attraction (1987)
- Candy on the Dart (1989)
- Candy and Sharon Olé (1991)
- Dangerous Fictions (1991)
- All Fall Down (1992)
- Unholy Ghosts (2000)
- Irish Myths & Legends (2000)
- We Were Happy There: A Hundred Years of St Louis High School Rathmines (2014)
- I'll Drop You a Line: A Life With David Marcus (2016)
