= Mary Black =

Irish folk singer

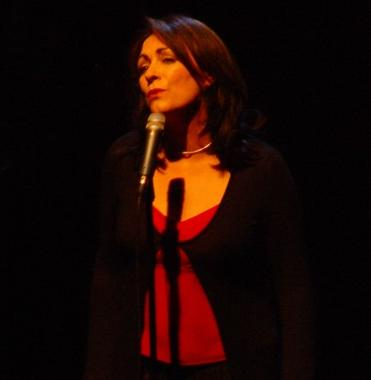
- Black performing at the Olympia Theatre, Dublin in 2005

Background information
- Born: 23 May 1955 (age 71); Dublin, Ireland
- Genres: Celtic, folk, country
- Occupation: Singer
- Years active: 1975–present
- Website: www.mary-black.net

Mary Black (born 23 May 1955) is an Irish folk singer. She is well known as an interpreter of both traditional folk and modern material which has made her a major recording artist in her native Ireland.

== Background ==
Mary Black was born into a musical family on Charlemont Street in Dublin, Ireland, and had four siblings. She was educated at St Louis High School, Rathmines. Her father was a fiddler, who came from Rathlin Island off the coast of Northern Ireland, and her mother was a singer. Her brothers Shay and Michael Black have their own musical group called the Black Brothers and her younger sister Frances would go on to achieve great success as a singer in the 1990s. From this musical background, Mary began singing traditional Irish songs at the age of eight. As she grew older, she began to perform with her siblings (Shay, Michael and Martin Black) in small clubs around Dublin.

== Musical career ==
=== 1980s ===
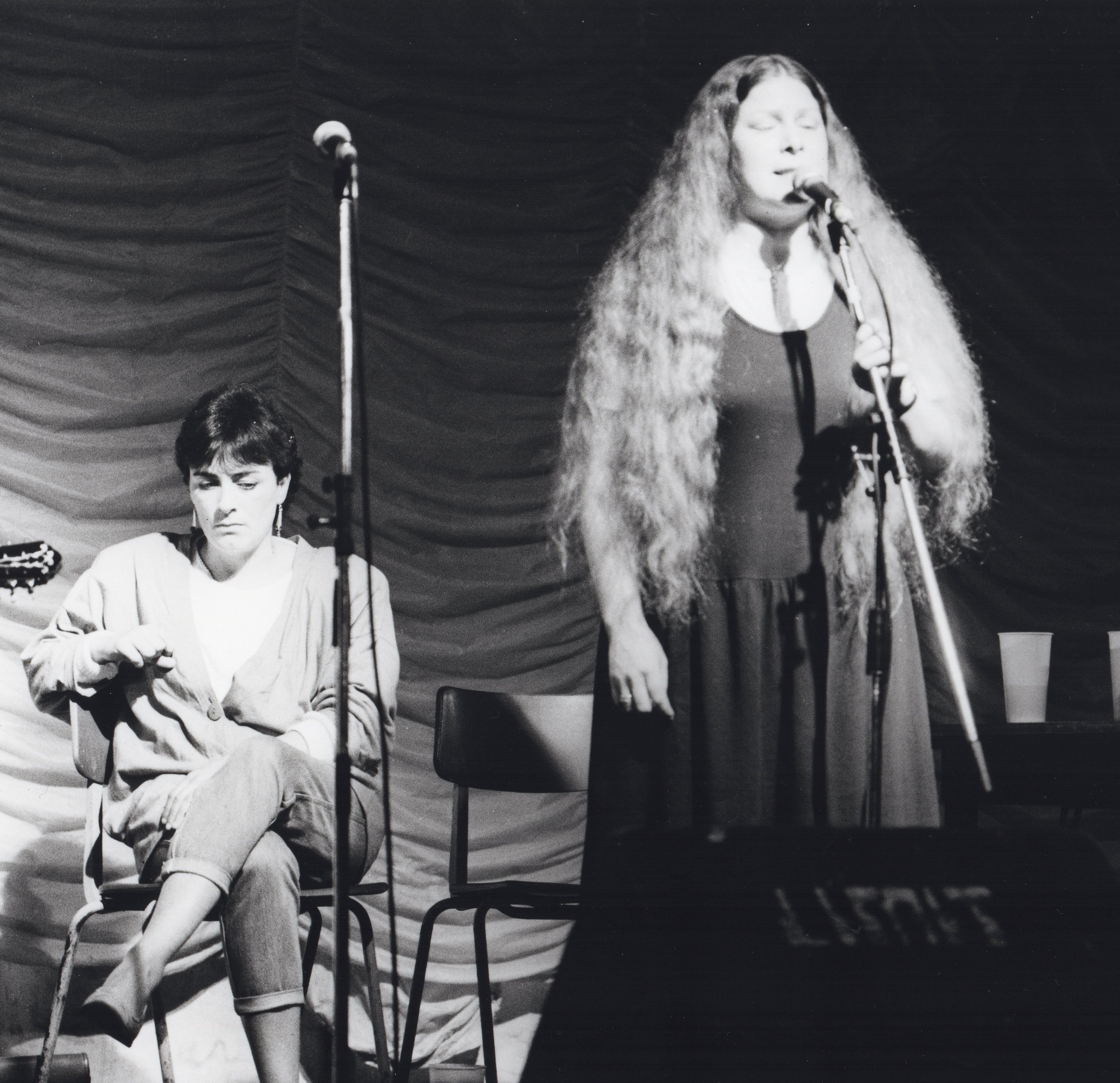
Black on stage with Dolores Keane at the Trowbridge Folk Festival 1985

Black joined a small folk band in 1975 called General Humbert, with whom she toured Europe and released two albums, in 1975 and 1978. In 1982 she developed a professional relationship with musician/producer Declan Sinnott and recorded her first solo album, Mary Black. The album performed well in the Irish charts and it went gold. In 1983 it was honoured by the Irish Independent and it is still referred to as one of the best Irish albums of the 1980s. Black ventured into traditional Irish music with the band De Dannan and toured with them around Europe and in the US. The album she recorded with them, Anthem, won the Irish Album of the Year award. During her time with De Dannan, Black also continued with her solo career with albums such as Collected (1984) and Without the Fanfare (1985). These recordings took Black into a more modern musical direction. Along with the success of these releases, IRMA named her Entertainer of the Year in 1986 and Best Female Artist in 1987 and 1988.

For much of her early solo career, Sinnott acted as her producer, guitarist and musical director. This partnership lasted until 1995 when they parted amicably.

Black departed from De Dannan in 1986, and 1987 saw the release of her first multi-platinum Irish album, By the Time it Gets Dark. However, her popularity reached new heights with the release of the ground-breaking album, No Frontiers, in August 1989. It rocketed to the top of the Irish album charts (it stayed in the Top 30 for over a year), and achieved triple-platinum status. Mary's popularity grew in the United States, due to several tours and widespread radio exposure.

=== 1990s ===
Following the success of No Frontiers in the United States, and the extensive airplay received by the lead track "Columbus", Black became a hit NAC recording artist. In spring 1991, she embarked on an American tour. Her 1991 release, Babes in the Wood, entered the Irish charts at No.1 once again and remained there for six weeks. Her single "The Thorn Upon the Rose" reached No.8 on the Japanese singles chart after it was used in a national railroad television advert. Babes in the Wood performed well in the US and it was voted one of the top 10 albums of the year in the United Kingdom by Today newspaper. The album release brought about a sell-out tour and her first concert at the Royal Albert Hall in January 1992, which was broadcast on Channel 4 a year later. She was once again named Best Female Artist by the IRMA.

Mary was featured on the cover of Billboard magazine in a story hailing her as "a firm favorite to join the heavy-hitting ranks of such Irish artists as Enya, Sinéad O'Connor and Clannad's Máire Brennan in the international marketplace". Her next album The Holy Ground once again reached the top of the Irish album chart. She also toured the US during October/November 1993, in support of the album. The next project saw Mary join forces with six Irish female artists to record the compilation album, A Woman's Heart. Other artists here included her sister Frances Black, Eleanor McEvoy, Dolores Keane, Sharon Shannon and Maura O'Connell. Its good sales success spawned another album, A Woman's Heart 2.

Black recorded two duets with American folk singer Joan Baez in the spring of 1995, for Baez's album Ring Them Bells. A greatest hits album of Mary's work, Looking Back, was released and she went touring mainly in the US, Germany and Scandinavia, to support the release. Black released three more albums in the 1990s, Circus, Shine, and Speaking with the Angel. She was named "Best Female Artist" in 1994 and 1996 for the fourth and fifth time.

=== 2000–present ===
Black released her first live album in 2003, Mary Black Live. She also released her only studio album of the 2000s decade, Full Tide. Although it was successful, she has kept a low musical profile in the last few years. In 2008, Black released a compilation album called "Twenty Five Years – Twenty Five Songs" celebrating her career in the music business. It contains 4 remixed tracks, fully remastered songs and 2 brand new recordings. In 2008, Black was invited to sing a duet on Christie Hennessy's posthumous album "The Two of Us" called "If You Were To Fall". She also made a guest appearance on Liam Clancy's album "The Wheels of Life" on the track "Talk To Me of Mendocino". In 2009 she is featured on one track of Steve Martin's album The Crow: New Songs for the 5-String Banjo. In 2011, she released a new album titled Stories from the Steeples. She has sung a duet live with Irish pop band Westlife entitled "Walking in the Air".

A 2014–2015 "Last Call" tour with her daughter Róisín O was billed as Black's final international tour although she intended to continue singing after this. Her autobiography Down the Crooked Road (ISBN 9781848271876) was published in October 2014.

In 2017, Black released a remastered version of her 1987 album, "By The Time It Gets Dark", to celebrate its 30th anniversary. The remastered album contains fully remixed and digitally remastered versions of the album's tracks, a brand new song recorded especially for the re-issue called "Wounded Heart" and a rare b-side called "Copper Kettle". Later in the year, Black released a brand new compilation album called "Mary Black Sings Jimmy MacCarthy" containing 6 previously recorded songs, four new tracks and one live duet with MacCarthy. Black toured in 2018 promoting the new album.

== Musical style ==
For a number of years, What Hi-Fi? magazine considered Black's voice to be so pure, that it was used as an audiophile benchmark for comparing the sound quality of different high fidelity systems. Music critic and lyricist Michael Leahy once said: "Over the years, Mary Black has come to define what many people see as the essence of Irish woman singers: profound, slightly ethereal and beyond the reaches of trends." Today, Black is held in high esteem in her native Ireland and beyond and is regarded as one of the most important Irish vocalists of her generation.

== Personal life ==
Mary is married to Joe O'Reilly, of Dara Records (established 1983), and they have two sons (Conor and Danny) and a daughter (Róisín). Her son Danny is a member of the Irish rock band The Coronas, while Róisín is performing under the name Róisín O. They reside in Dublin, but spend much time in County Kerry.

== Discography ==
=== Studio albums ===
- Mary Black (1982)
- Collected (1984)
- Without the Fanfare (1985)
- By the Time It Gets Dark (1987)
- No Frontiers (1989)
- Babes in the Wood (1991)
- The Holy Ground (1993)
- Circus (1995)
- Shine (1997)
- Speaking with the Angel (1999)
- Full Tide (2005)
- Stories from the Steeples (deluxe edition contains 3 bonus tracks, 2011)
- By The Time It Gets Dark – 30th Anniversary Edition (fully remastered album containing a newly recorded song and bonus material, 2017)

=== Compilation albums ===
- The Best of Mary Black (1990)
- The Collection (1992)
- Looking Back (1995)
- Song for Ireland [USA] (1998)
- The Best of Mary Black 1991-2001 & Hidden Harvest (2001)
- Twenty Five Years, Twenty Five Songs (compilation with new and re-recorded material, 2008)
- Down The Crooked Road – The Soundtrack (soundtrack accompanying Mary's autobiography of the same name, 2014)
- Mary Black Sings Jimmy MacCarthy (compilation including new and previously recorded material of Jimmy MacCarthy songs, 2017)
- Mary Black Orchestrated (2019)
