= Heroes or Ghosts =

Studio album by The Coronas
- Released: 5 October 2007
- Recorded: Cauldron Studios, Dublin
- Genre: Indie rock, Pop rock
- Length: 46:31
- Label: 3ú Records
- Producer: Joe Chester

The Coronas chronology
Heroes or Ghosts (2007)	Tony Was an Ex-Con (2009)

Singles from Heroes Or Ghosts
- 1. "San Diego Song" Released: 11 May 2007; 2. "Heroes or Ghosts" Released: 5 September 2007

Heroes or Ghosts is the debut album by the Irish indie act The Coronas, released in October 2007 by 3ú Records and published by Little Rox Music. An Irish language version of the titular song was also recorded called "Taibhsí nó Laoich".

== Track listing ==
"San Diego Song"

All tracks are written by Danny O'Reilly, except where noted.

No.	Title	Writer(s)	Length
1.	"Grace Don't Wait"	Dave McPhillips	3:25
2.	"Make a Change"		3:41
3.	"San Diego Song"		2:51
4.	"Heroes or Ghosts"	Dave McPhillips	4:33
5.	"The Talk"		3:55
6.	"The Great Divide"		3:28
7.	"I Choose Love"		4:24
8.	"Decision Time"		3:29
9.	"Filtho"		2:48
10.	"Real World"		3:44
11.	"The Joker"		10:13
Total length:			46:36

Japanese bonus tracks
No.	Title	Length
12.	"Three Years Too Late"
13.	"Take Your Lies" (Live At The Button Factory)
