= Sibéal Ní Chasaide =

Irish singer specializing in the Irish singing style of sean-nós

- Born: 1998 (age 27–28); Ireland
- Origin: Ráth Chairn
- Genre: Irish Folk
- Years active: 2016–present
- Website: www.sibealofficial.com

Sibéal Ní Chasaide (Irish pronunciation: [ʃɪˈbʲeːlˠ n̠ʲiː ˈxasˠədʲə]; born 1998), known mononymously as Sibéal, is an Irish singer from the Ráth Chairn Gaeltacht, County Meath, specializing in the centuries-old melismatic Irish singing style of sean-nós. She is best known for singing Mise Éire by composer Patrick Cassidy who composed music to the poem of Patrick Pearse's Mise Éire at the official government commemorations of the 1916 Rising.

== Personal life ==
Her father Odhrán is a member of Irish traditional group Na Casaidigh.

== Discography ==
=== Albums ===
- Clapsholas (2022)
- Sibéal (2019) No. 6 Irish Albums Chart

=== Live albums ===
- Sibéal – Live at Abbey Road Studios (2019)

=== Songs ===
- "The Parting Glass" (2018)
- "Human" (2019)
- Traditional: "Carrickfergus" (arr. Pacey) (2019)
- "Fuarú" - with The Cranberries (Irish-language cover of Linger)

=== Filmography ===
- "1916" (2016) - 3 episodes
- "1916 Centenary" (2016)
- "Ooops! The Adventure Continues" (2020)
