= St Louis High School, Rathmines =

St. Louis High School, Rathmines Ardscoil San Lughaidh,

Location
- Charleville Road, Rathmines; Dublin; Ireland; 53.3214°N 6.2701°W

Information
- Type: Secondary School
- Motto: "Dieu Le Veult", "Ut Sint Unum"
- Established: 1913
- Principal: Louise Stenson
- Staff: 60
- Gender: female
- Age: 11 to 19
- Enrollment: 700
- Colour
- Website: www.stlouishighschool.ie

St. Louis High School is an all-girls secondary school located in Rathmines, Dublin.

== History ==
The school was founded in 1913 by the Sisters of St. Louis, a religious community of nuns which was founded in post-revolutionary France in 1842. The school crest symbolises loyalty to the French crown.

An edited collection entitled We were happy there: Hundred Years of St Louis High School Rathmines by Ita Daly describes the experiences of being a pupil at the school.

The school and others originally established by the Sisters of St. Louis are now under the trusteeship of The Le Cheile Schools Trust. Le Chéile formally came into being on 1 September 2009 and offers a network of support for all St. Louis schools and staff.

The school is a 3 story building.

There are two school mottoes. The primary motto 'Dieu le Veult' which is old French for 'God Wills It' - the rallying cry of the Crusaders. The second motto is 'Ut sint unum' - for 'that they may be one'.

== Academics ==
In 2018, the school was ranked fourth in Ireland in terms of the number of students who progressed to third level and by the types of institutions to which the students progressed.

== Notable people ==
- Frances Black - singer.
- Mary Black - singer
- Ita Daly - writer
- Anne Enright - writer
- Stacey Flood - Irish international rugby player
- Betty Ann Norton - acting teacher
- Nessa O'Mahony - poet and writer
- Marian Richardson - broadcaster, actor, and producer
- Ann Riordan - first general manager of Microsoft Ireland.
- Kelly Thornton, actress
- Éilís Ní Bhrádaigh, writer and lexicographer
- Órla Slattery, ceramicist
