= David Marcus (writer) =

Irish writer

David Marcus (21 August 1924 in County Cork – 9 May 2009) was an Irish Jewish editor and writer who was a lifelong advocate for and editor of Irish fiction.

== Life and times ==
Born in County Cork in 1924, Marcus was the much-loved editor of numerous anthologies of Irish fiction and poetry, including the Phoenix Irish Short Stories collections.

Other notable projects included the page New Irish Writing for the Irish Press, which provided a forum for aspiring Irish authors, publishing most of the most important names in Irish fiction, many for the first time, including Dermot Bolger, Ita Daly, Anne Enright, Neil Jordan, Claire Keegan, John McGahern, Michael Feeney Callan, Bernard MacLaverty, Eilis Ni Dhuibhne, Joseph O'Connor, Colm Tóibín, Colum McCann and William Wall. He was, in the words of Fintan O'Toole "the single most important literary editor in Ireland in the second half of the 20th century".

His 1986 novel, A Land Not Theirs, a fictionalized account of the experiences of the Cork Jewish community during the Irish War of Independence was a bestseller. In 1986, his second novel, which drew on his experiences among the Cork Jewish community, A Land in Flames was also a popular success.

In 2001, Marcus published Oughtobiography – Leaves from the diary of a hyphenated Jew, an autobiographical review of his life as an Irish Jew and as an important figure in Irish literature.

On 3 June 2005, he was awarded an honorary Degree of Doctor of Literature by the National University of Ireland, University College, Cork.

Marcus was married to fellow Irish novelist Ita Daly and lived in Rathgar in Dublin. In 2016 she published a memoir of their life together, I'll Drop You a Line: A Life With David Marcus.

== Bibliography ==
- Marcus, David (1998). Phoenix Irish Short Stories 1998. Weidenfeld & Nicolson. ISBN 1-86159-130-6.
- Marcus, David (2003). Phoenix Irish Short Stories 2003. London: Weidenfeld and Nicolson. p. 213. ISBN 0-7538-1717-9.
