= Ann Riordan =

First general manager of Microsoft Ireland (1947–2021)

- Born: Ann Kelly; 17 July 1947; Dublin
- Died: 5 March 2021 (aged 73); Dublin

Ann Riordan (17 July 1947 – 5 March 2021) was the first woman to become the first general manager of Microsoft Ireland.

== Biography ==
Born Ann Kelly on 17 July 1947 Riordan was the daughter of a CIÉ mechanic, Joe Kelly, and seamstress Lillie Kelly. Lillie taught in The Grafton Academy. Riordan had six siblings. The family grew up in Dublin in Rathfarnham. Riordan attended the St. Louis High School but left at sixteen before sitting her Leaving Certificate.

Riordan left school to get a job with the Gas Company in Dublin. However, almost immediately she discovered that the women in Alliance and Dublin Consumers Gas Company were not being paid the backdated cost-of-living increase which had been agreed with the Irish Transport and General Workers Union. She discovered first-hand the attitude to women as workers. She was a leader in compelling management to give an equal increase to the women employees. Her next move was to apply for a job as a central heating designer. Again she faced obstacles when told the role was a man's job. Aged nineteen she objected to that and was given the position.

When she married Frank Riordan, she faced her next challenge. There was a ban on married women in the workplace. Riordan's employer told her they would be happy to see her back but that the unions this time were preventing it. The union granted her a six-month compromise and Riordan returned to work. However, in 1974 Riordan moved to London. There she got a role with L'Oréal and began her UK career. She first started in the tech industry with a position in Wordplex in 1976. Since Wordplex was a start-up, Riordan was exposed to every aspect of business and soon returned to Ireland as the managing director of the company.

In 1991 Riordan was selected to be the Microsoft country manager for Ireland. By 1996 she had won the company's 'Chairman's award' for what she had achieved in both Ireland and Europe. Riordan retired in 2000. She got involved in various organizations and was President of the Institute of Directors In Ireland, Chair of the Science Foundation Ireland, Chair of the National Standards Authority of Ireland and Tourism Ireland.
