= The Black Family (band) =

Celtic music ensemble

- Origin: Dublin, Ireland
- Years active: 1965–1977, 1986, 1989, 1995, 2004—present
- Members: Mary Black; Frances Black; Martin Black
- Past members: Shay Black; Michael Black
- Website: Black Family biography

The Black Family are a Celtic music ensemble, composed of Mary and Frances Black and their siblings, Shay, Michael, and Martin. The family has been called "one of the most important musical clans in Ireland".

== History ==
The five were born into a musical family; their father, who hailed from Rathlin Island, was a fiddle player, and their mother was a music hall singer. The siblings perform together as a quintet in Dublin from the 1970s to the present day, and in 1977, Mary continued to play solo and with the groups General Humbert and De Dannan. Both Mary and Frances went on to become highly successful solo artists. The five siblings recorded a self-titled album, released in 1986. In 1989, they recorded again, with Mary producing the album for her four siblings. They reunited in 2004 for a third album, which also features their mother, Patty, singing on one tune. They continue to reunite for occasional live performances.

Shay and Michael moved to California in the early 1990s and continue to have successful musical careers performing as The Black Brothers. The brothers released What a Time in 1995. Michael released his first solo and self-titled CD, Michael Black, produced by John Doyle, in 2006. Michael and Shay Black continue to tour as a band, The Black Brothers, throughout the United States and Canada. Martin lives in Dublin, and although family commitments have reduced his music commitment, he still plays small gigs in Dublin.

== Dynasty ==
Mary's son Danny O'Reilly is the lead singer of The Coronas and her daughter Róisín O is a singer-songwriter, while Frances' daughter Aoife Scott was a finalist in the Liet International song contest for minority languages in 2011, and her son Eoghan Scott is also a solo artist and producer.

== Discography ==
- The Black Family (Dara Records, 1986)
- Time for Touching Home (Dara, 1989)
- What a Time (Dara, 1995)
- Our Time Together (Dara, 2004)

== See also ==
- The Coronas - the band led by Danny O'Reilly, the son of Mary Black
