= Éilís Ní Bhrádaigh =

Irish writer and lexicographer (1927–2007)

- Born: Éilís Ní Bhrádaigh; 1 April 1927; Dublin
- Died: 17 May 2007 (aged 80); Dublin
- Known for: Irish language lexicographer

Éilís Ní Bhrádaigh (1 April 1927 – 17 May 2007), writer and lexicographer was involved in the creation of three major Irish-language dictionaries.

== Biography ==
Éilís Ní Bhrádaigh was born Alice Brady to Francis Brady and Elena Nolan in Fairview, Dublin, on 1 April 1927. She was one of four, with a brother Christy, and two sisters, Áine and Margaret. Her father was involved in 1916 Easter Rising and her uncle Christopher printed the Proclamation of the Irish Republic. Ní Bhrádaigh got her education, first in St. Mary's School, Marlborough Street, Dublin near where the family lived before they moved to Cabra, Dublin. She then attended St Louis High School, Rathmines. After winning the Coiste na bPáistí Gaeltacht Scholarship Ní Bhrádaigh spent time in Connemara, County Galway to study Irish. Ní Bhrádaigh went on to join the civil service where she got a position in the dictionary section in 1945. There Ní Bhrádaigh worked with Tomás de Bhaldraithe and became friends with him and his wife Vivienne. Through her work on the dictionary Ní Bhrádaigh met a significant number of pivotal people in the Irish language including Máire Mhac an tSaoi, Séamus Ó Saothraí, Seán an Cóta Caomhánach, Pádraig Ua Maoileoin and others.

Ní Bhrádaigh worked on the street games of Cabra and a book was published on the subject in 1975 by the Irish Folklore Commission. She collected the speech and words of Dublin city and donated her collection to the Department of Irish Folklore at University College, Dublin. Her intention had been to publish the collection in a book. She died on 17 May 2007. Ní Bhrádaigh was a member of the Old Dublin Society and treasurer of the Merriman Society.

== Bibliography ==
- English-Irish dictionary (1959)
- English-Irish Dictionary (1977)
- Foclóir na Nua-Ghaeilge ' (Royal Irish Academy)
- Foclóir Póca (1986)
- All in, all in: A selection of Dublin Children's traditional Street Games with Rhymes and Music (1975)
