= Time Stopped =

Studio album by The Coronas
- Released: 7 October 2022
- Studio: Eastcote Studios
- Genres: Indie pop, pop rock
- Length: 41:21
- Label: So Far So Good
- Producer: George Murphy

The Coronas chronology
True Love Waits (2020)	Time Stopped (2022)

Singles from Time Stopped
- 1. "Write Our Own Soundtrack" Released: 22 October 2021; 2. "Strive" Released: 20 May 2022; 3. "Don't You Say You're In Love" Released: 29 June 2022; 4. "At Least We'll Always Have LA" Released: 12 August 2022; 5. "If You Let Me" Released: 7 September 2022

Time Stopped is the seventh studio album released by the Irish indie band The Coronas. It was released on 7 October 2022 via the band's own independent label So Far So Good. A deluxe edition of the album was released on 2 June 2023 with two additional tracks "The Lakes And Sometimes Heroes" along with "I’ll Regain Composure" This album marks the band's first release without guitarist Dave McPhillips, who departed from the band at the end of 2019.

== Background ==
The album was announced in October 2021 with the release of the lead single "Write Our Own Soundtrack" on streaming platforms and an accompanying music video on social media.

Lead singer Danny O'Reilly stated in an interview: "After the two years of the pandemic, it felt so good to be back in the studio, locked away from the world, and just being a band again. Relationships and our place in the world are given a new perspective. Even though it came together in an uncertain time, Time Stopped is a positive album about togetherness and support.”

The album was written in late 2021 during lockdown, O'Reilly explained: "The album was written during the lockdowns in late 2021, but I wouldn’t call it a lockdown album. The songs are personal snapshots of what was going on in our lives, and most of them make reference to the pandemic in some small way without being directly about it. It’s an honest record, filled with gratitude and optimism, and sonically, it’s our most ambitious album yet"

The track "At Least We'll Always Have LA" was originally designated as "LA at Knight pt.2" during its inception, serving as a nod to a song featured on the album "True Love Waits", released in 2020.

== Release and promotion ==
A second single "Strive" was released on 20 May 2022. This was followed by "Don't You Say You're In Love" on 29 June 2022. "At Least We'll Always Have LA" was released 12 August 2022. The final single "If You Let Me" was released on 7 September 2022.

To promote the album, The Coronas appeared on the Irish talk show The Late Late Show to perform "If You Let Me"

== Track listing ==
All tracks are written by The Coronas.

Time Stopped track listing
No.	Title	Length
1.	"Intro (DYSIL)"	1:34
2.	"Don't You Say You're In Love"	3:14
3.	"Write Our Own Soundtrack"	3:53
4.	"If You Let Me"	3:19
5.	"The Best Worrier"	3:53
6.	"Strive"	3:22
7.	"Karma"	3:28
8.	"At Least We'll Always Have LA"	3:48
9.	"Take Me With You if You're Leaving"	4:44
10.	"Getaway Car"	2:58
11.	"Blessed To Call You My Own"	3:22
12.	"Time Stopped"	3:50
Total length:		41:20

Deluxe edition bonus tracks
No.	Title	Length
13.	"The Lakes And Sometimes Heroes"	3:32
14.	"I’ll Regain Composure"	3:12
Total length:		48:05

== Critical reception ==
Time Stopped received acclaim for its depth and variety. Hot Press highlighted its successful blend of sounds, noting introspective tracks like "Blessed To Call You My Own" and "Karma" for their complexity and awarded the album an 8.5 out of 10. The title track was praised for its contemplation of life's priorities amid uncertainty.

== Personnel ==
The Coronas

- Danny O'Reilly – lead vocals, guitar
- Graham Knox – bass guitar
- Conor Egan – drums

Additional musicians

- Alma Kelliher – backing vocals
- Róisín O – backing vocals

Production

- George Murphy – producer
- Peter Katis – mixing
- Gearoid O'Dea – artwork
- Daire Bourke Boyle – design
- Seán Mongey – design
- Cian MacSweeny – mastering
