= The Holy Ground (album) =

Studio album by Mary Black
- Released: 1993
- Studio: Windmill Lane Studios, Dublin
- Genre: Celtic
- Label: The Grapeline Label
- Producer: Declan Sinnott

Mary Black chronology
Babes in the Wood (1991)	The Holy Ground (1993)	Circus (1995)

The Holy Ground is a 1993 album by Mary Black. The album went platinum in Ireland on the day of its release and reached number one on the Irish albums chart.

== Track listing ==
1. "Summer Sent You" (Noel Brazil) - 3:17
2. "Flesh and Blood" (Shane Howard) - 4:01
3. "The Loving Time" (Noel Brazil) - 4:26
4. "Golden Thread" (Thom Moore) - 4:10
5. "The Holy Ground" (Traditional; arranged by Mary Black and Jimmy Crowley) - 4:29
6. "Treasure Island" (John Gorka) - 3:12
7. "The Holy Ground" (Gerry O'Beirne) - 3:20
8. "One Way Donkey Ride" (Sandy Denny) - 3:26
9. "Dockland" (Noel Brazil) - 4:22
10. "Lay Down Your Burden" (Jesse Winchester) - 3:06
11. "Paper Friends" (Noel Brazil) - 4:00
12. "Poison Words" (Paul Doran) - 4:28

== Personnel ==
- Mary Black - vocals, harmony vocals
- Declan Sinnott - acoustic guitar, electric guitar, Spanish guitar, lap steel guitar, mandola, synthesizer, harmony vocals
- Garvan Gallagher - double bass, electric bass
- Frank Gallagher - fiddle, synthesizer, whistle, string arrangement on "Poison Words"
- Pat Crowley - keyboards, electric piano, piano, accordion, harmony vocals
- Dave Early - drums, percussion, congas
- Carl Geraghty - tenor and soprano saxophone
- Mel Mercier - tabla on "Golden Thread"
- Mairéad Ní Mhaonaigh - additional vocals on "The Holy Ground"
- The Vanbrugh String Quartet - strings on "Poison Words"
