= Róisín O =

Irish singer, songwriter, musician

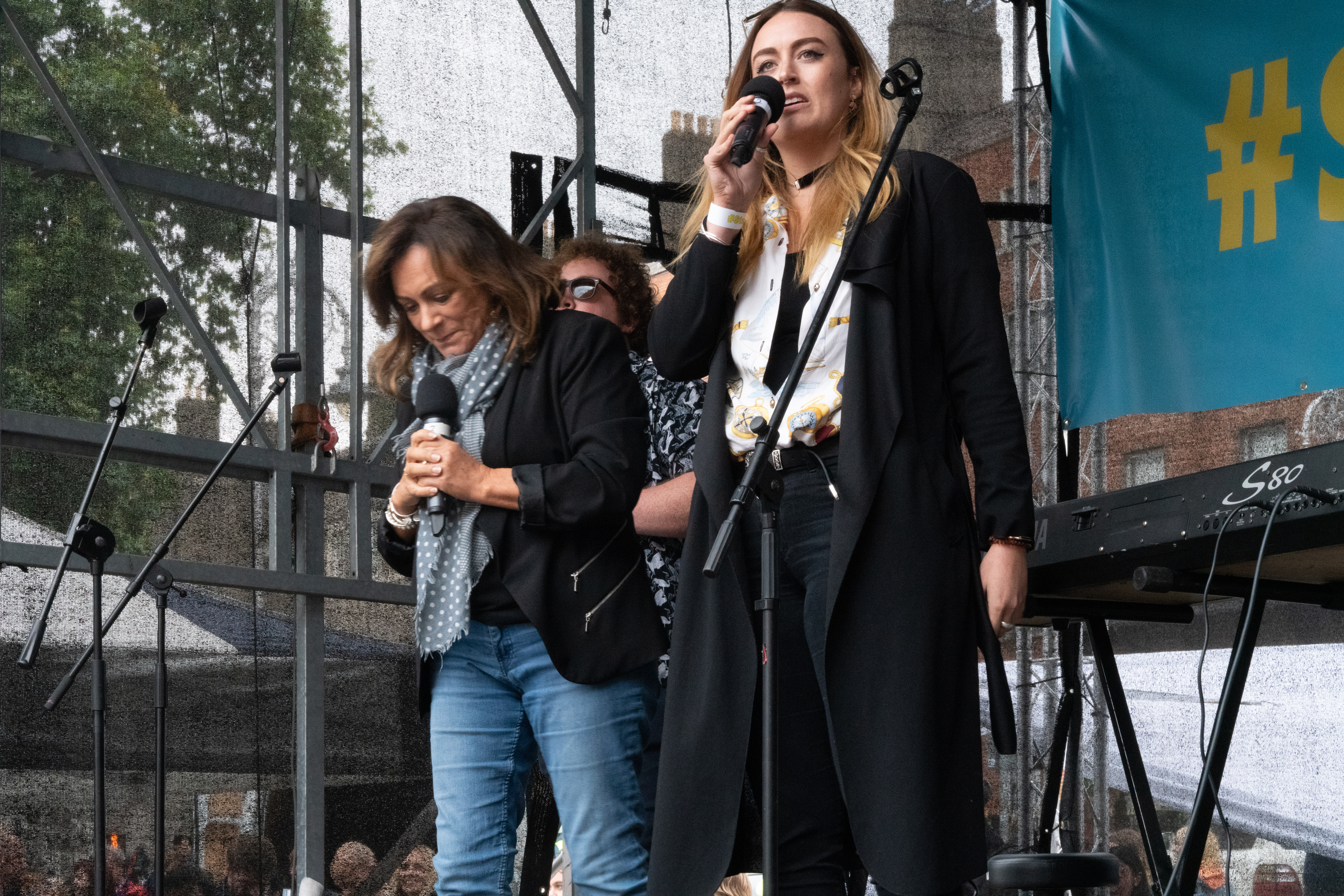
- Róisín O in 2018

Background information
- Origin: Kimmage, Dublin, Ireland
- Genres: Folk
- Years active: 2007 – present
- Label: 3ú
- Website: www.roisino.com

Róisín O is an Irish singer, songwriter, and musician. She is signed to independent label 3ú Records. She released her debut album The Secret Life of Blue in 2012, and it entered the Irish charts at number 21. The album was produced by David Odlum, and was described by the Sunday Times as "evoking the likes of Joni Mitchell, Joanna Newsom and Kate Bush". The daughter of Mary Black, she has performed with members of the Black Family band.

== Discography ==
=== Studio albums ===
| Year | Album details | Peak chart positions |
| Year | Album details | IRL |
|---|---|---|
| 2012 | The Secret Life of Blue: Released: 21 September 2012; Label: 3ú Records; Formats: CD, Download | 21 |
| 2022 | Courageous: Released: 29 April 2022; Label: 3ú Records; Formats: Download | 3 |

== Notable appearances ==
Róisín has performed on RTÉ's The Late Late Show, TV3's The 7 O'Clock Show, and Ireland AM.

Róisín O performed at Electric Picnic in 2012, the festival which inspired her first single "Here We Go".

In December 2012, Róisín O supported Lionel Richie on his Irish tour. In the same month, Róisín O also supported The Coronas in The O2. Ryan Sheridan also supported. Róisín was invited back out to sing Mic Christopher's song "Heyday" as an encore with The Coronas.

Róisín performed on The John Murray Show on RTÉ Radio 1 in January 2013.

Róisín supported Mary Black on her world tour with dates in the UK, the Netherlands, the US, Sweden, Germany, and Australia

Róisín O performed in a special Saint Patrick's Day 2013 programme from Áras an Uachtaráin for President Michael D Higgins, alongside other Irish performers such as Bono, Christy Moore, Glen Hansard, Imelda May, The Script, and Lisa Hannigan.

In 2020, Róisín was part of an Irish collective of female singers and musicians called "Irish Women in Harmony", that recorded a version of the song "Dreams" in aid of the charity Safe Ireland, which deals with domestic abuse which had reportedly risen significantly during the COVID-19 lockdown.

== Personal life ==
Róisín O is the daughter of Irish singer Mary Black, and the sister of Danny O'Reilly of The Coronas.
