= Public Health (Alcohol) Act 2018 =

Irish law

Oireachtas
- Long title: An Act to provide for the minimum price per gram of alcohol, to confer the power on the Minister for Health to, by order, increase that price, to provide for the labelling of alcohol products including the inclusion of health warnings and the alcohol content and energy content of alcohol products on alcohol product containers, to provide that an applicant for the grant or renewal of a licence under the Licensing Acts 1833 to 2011 and an applicant for the grant or renewal of a licence under the Registration of Clubs Acts 1904 to 2008 shall notify the Health Service Executive of the application, to provide for restrictions in relation to the advertising and sponsorship of alcohol products, generally and in relation to children, to provide procedures in relation to the exposure for sale and advertising of alcohol products in specified licensed premises, to confer power on the Minister for Health to make regulations for the purpose of prohibiting or restricting the sale of alcohol products in certain circumstances, to provide for enforcement measures, to provide for the repeal of certain provisions of the Intoxicating Liquor Act 2003 and the Intoxicating Liquor Act 2008, and to provide for related matters.
- Citation: No. 24 of 2018
- Territorial extent: Ireland
- Considered by: Dáil
- Passed: 3 October 2018
- Considered by: Seanad
- Passed: 3 October 2018
- Signed by: President Michael D. Higgins
- Signed: 17 October 2018
- Commenced: Commenced in part: 6 November 2018; 14 May 2021; 2023; 2023

Legislative history

Initiating chamber: Dáil
- Bill title: Public Health (Alcohol) Bill 2015
- Bill citation: No. 120 of 2015
- Introduced by: Minister for Health (Leo Varadkar)
- Introduced: 10 December 2015
- Committee responsible: Health
- First reading: 17 December 2015
- Second reading: 26 October 2016
- Considered by the Health Committee: 8 November 2017
- Report and Final Stage: 15 December 2017

Revising chamber: Seanad
- Member(s) in charge: Minister for Health (Deputy Simon Harris)
- Second reading: 6 March 2018
- Considered in committee: 3 October 2018
- Report and Final Stage: 3 October 2018

Final stages
- Seanad amendments considered by the Dáil: 3 October 2018
- Finally passed both chambers: 3 October 2018

Summary
- Restricts advertising by alcohol companies and introduces a statutory minimum price for alcohol.
- Status: Not fully in force

The Public Health (Alcohol) Act 2018 (Act No. 24 of 2018) is an Act of the Oireachtas.

It was first published in 2015 and agreed on by the Dáil in October 2018. It is intended to reduce alcohol consumption and the harms caused by the misuse of alcohol. It provides for statutory minimum prices on alcohol, restrictions on advertising, stark warning labels on alcohol products, and the separation and reduced visibility of alcohol products in mixed trading outlets.

== Background ==
Alcohol has historically been a major contributory factor for injuries presented to emergency departments, road traffic fatalities, house fires and domestic abuse and there was an increase of hospital discharges related to alcohol of 92% between 1992 and 2005.

Inaccurate statements regarding the safety of drinking small amounts of alcohol were observed in several different textbooks used in Irish universities.

The alcohol industry has held economic and political influence and capital for 'centuries', challenging bills and other actions of the Department of Health to promote public health. Many TDs hold constituency meetings in pubs, the alcohol industry secured an extra hour of opening times and further liberalisation of licensing laws.

Before the implementation of minimum unit pricing, it was expected that the policy would reduce alcohol-attributable mortality among heavy drinkers, men and those on low income.

Before the implementation of the cancer warning rule, there was a general lack of awareness of the risks of cancer associated with alcohol.

== Commencement of the law ==
The Minister for Health Simon Harris brought 23 sections of the Bill into operation in November 2018. Alcohol advertising is to be banned within 200 metres of a school, crèche, or local authority playground and in or on public service vehicles, at public transport stops or stations from 2019. From 12 November 2020 alcohol products must be separated by a 1.2 metres (3 ft 11 in) high barrier from other goods. From 2021 various measures come into force to ensure that children are protected from alcohol advertising.

From 2026, alcoholic drinks will have to have warnings describing the cancer risks associated with alcohol.

== Impact ==
Increased sales of alcohol in border areas in Northern Ireland were noticed, but this has not been scientifically verified and cross-border purchases were found to be minimal across England and Scotland.

Across all demographic groups in Ireland, there has been support for further evidence-based alcohol policies for promoting public health.
