= Tony Was an Ex-Con =

Studio album by The Coronas
- Released: 25 September 2009
- Genre: Indie rock, Pop rock
- Label: 3ú Records

The Coronas chronology
Heroes or Ghosts (2007)	Tony Was an Ex-Con (2009)	Closer to You (2011)

Tony Was An Ex-Con is the second studio album by the Irish indie act The Coronas, released 25 September 2009 by 3ú Records. A version of "Listen Dear" in Irish was also released, entitled "Éist a Ghrá".

== Track listing ==
1. "Won't Leave You Alone" - 3:54
2. "Far From Here" - 4:14
3. "Someone Else's Hands" - 4:26
4. "Listen Dear" - 3:31
5. "This Is Not A Test" - 4:11
6. "Warm" - 3:53
7. "Tony Was An Ex-Con" - 3:09
8. "Point Me Towards The Sky" - 3:00
9. "Sandy" - 2:47
10. "Faith In Fate" - 4:34
11. "All The Luck In The World" - 4:13
