= Always =

Always may refer to:

== Film and television ==
- Always (1985 film), an American comedy-drama directed by Henry Jaglom
- Always (1989 film), an American romantic comedy-drama directed by Steven Spielberg
- Always (2011 film), a South Korean romantic drama directed by Song Il-gon
- Always: Sunset on Third Street, a 2005 Japanese drama, and two sequels
- "Always" (Castle), a 2012 TV episode
- "Always" (Chicago Fire), a 2014 TV episode
- "Always" (Dead Like Me), a 2004 TV episode
- "Always" (Friday Night Lights), a 2011 TV episode
- "Always" (NASCAR Racers), a 2000 TV episode

== Music ==
=== Albums ===
- Always (Aziza Mustafa Zadeh album) or the title instrumental, 1993
- Always (Chris Tomlin album) or the title song (see below), 2022
- Always (Gabrielle album) or the title song, 2007
- Always (The Gathering album) or the title song, 1992
- Always (Hazell Dean album), 1988
- Always (Matana Roberts album), 2015
- Always (Patsy Cline album), 1980
- Always (Pebbles album) or the title song, 1990
- Always (Willie Nelson album), 1980
- Always (Xiu Xiu album), 2012
- Always: The Very Best of Erasure or the 1994 title song (see below), 2015
- Always, by June Tabor, 2005
- Always, by Kelli O'Hara, 2011
- Always, by Michael Ball, 1993
- Always, by Tin Tin Out, 1998

=== EPs ===
- Always (BigBang EP) or the title song, 2007
- Always (Panama EP) or the title song, 2013

=== Songs ===
- "Always" (Atlantic Starr song), 1987
- "Always" (Aysel and Arash song), 2009
- "Always" (Blink-182 song), 2004
- "Always" (Bon Jovi song), 1994
- "Always" (Chris Tomlin song), 2022
- "Always" (Erasure song), 1994
- "Always" (Irving Berlin song), 1925; recorded by many and used in the plot of Blithe Spirit
- "Always" (James Ingram song), 1986
- "Always" (Killswitch Engage song), 2013
- "Always" (Mai Kuraki song), 2001
- "Always" (Mika Nakashima song), 2010
- "Always" (MK song), 1992
- "Always" (Saliva song), 2002
- "Always" (Samantha Jade song), 2016
- "Always" (Switchfoot song), 2009
- "Always" (Trina song), 2010
- "Always", by Above & Beyond from Common Ground
- "Always", by Air Supply from News from Nowhere
- "Always", by Amon Tobin from Foley Room
- "Always", by Andy Grammer from The Good Parts
- "Always", by Apink from Pink Up
- "Always", by Bag Raiders from Bag Raiders
- "Always", by Bent from Programmed to Love
- "Always", by BT from These Hopeful Machines
- "Always", by Comeback Kid from Turn It Around
- "Always", by Corey Hart from Attitude & Virtue
- "Always", by David Guetta from Pop Life
- "Always", by Dennis Kamakahi from the soundtrack of the film Lilo & Stitch 2: Stitch Has a Glitch
- "Always", by Dope from American Apathy
- "Always", by Dreamcatcher from Apocalypse: Save Us
- "Always", by Gavin James
- "Always", by Julian Lennon from Everything Changes
- "Always", by Kana Nishino
- "Always", by Madeline Kenney from Night Night at the First Landing
- "Always", by Maurice Williams and the Zodiacs from Stay with Maurice Williams & The Zodiacs
- "Always", by the Mighty Lemon Drops from Sound ... Goodbye to Your Standards
- "Always", by Misia from Kiss in the Sky
- "Always", by Panic! at the Disco from Vices & Virtues
- "Always", by Pet Shop Boys, a B-side of the single "Home and Dry"
- "Always", by Plumb from Blink
- "Always", by Real Life from Heartland
- "Always", by Rex Orange County from Pony
- "Always", by Seventh Day Slumber from Finally Awake
- "Always", by Shin Ji for the MMORPG Yogurting
- "Always", by Suede from Bloodsports
- "Always", by Sum 41 from All the Good Shit
- "Always", by Toni Braxton from More Than a Woman
- "Always", by U2, a B-side of the single "Beautiful Day"
- "Always", by the Veronicas from The Veronicas
- "Always (Outro)", by Bryson Tiller from True to Self

== Other uses ==
- Always (brand), a brand of feminine hygiene products
- "Always" (short story), a 2007 short story by Karen Joy Fowler

== See also ==
- Always, Always, a 1969 album by Porter Wagoner and Dolly Parton, and the title song
- Alvvays, a Canadian band
  - Alvvays (album), a 2014 album by Alvvays
- Alway (disambiguation)
- "Always Somewhere", a 1979 song by Scorpions from Lovedrive
- Always on My Mind (disambiguation)
- Always Was (disambiguation)
- Forever and Always (disambiguation)
