= On My Mind =

On My Mind may refer to:

- "On My Mind" (Alex Warren and Rosé song), 2025
- "On My Mind" (Cody Simpson song), 2011
- "On My Mind" (Diplo and Sidepiece song), 2019
- "On My Mind" (Disciples song), 2017
- "On My Mind" (Ellie Goulding song), 2015
- On My Mind, a 2015 EP by Bend Sinister
- "On My Mind", a song by Jeff Lynne's ELO from the 2015 album Alone in the Universe
- "On My Mind", a 2021 song by Mashd N Kutcher
- "On My Mind", a song by New Found Glory from the 2006 album Coming Home
- "On My Mind", a 2015 single by Don Diablo
- On My Mind (film), a 2021 short film

== Other uses ==
- "(Baby I've Got You) On My Mind", a 2003 song by Powderfinger

== See also ==
- Always on My Mind (disambiguation)
- In My Mind (disambiguation)
- My Mind (disambiguation)
