= Alway (disambiguation) =

Alway is a suburb of Newport, Wales, UK

Alway may also refer to:

== People ==
- Jackie Alway (born 1966), British music publishing executive
- Renee Alway (born 1986), American model
- Richard Alway, Canadian educator and religious layman
- Robert Alway (1790–1840), Upper Canada politician
- James Alway Ross (1869–1945), Canadian politician

== See also ==
- Allway (disambiguation)
- Always (disambiguation)
- Elway (disambiguation)
- Way (disambiguation)
- All (disambiguation)
- Al (disambiguation)
