= Always and Forever =

Always and Forever may refer to:

== Books ==
- Always and Forever, a children's book illustrated by Debi Gliori

== Film and TV ==
- Always & Forever (film), a 1991 Swiss film
- To All the Boys: Always and Forever, a 2021 American film
- "Always and Forever", an episode of the TV series The Jamie Foxx Show

== Music ==
=== Albums ===
- Always & Forever (Eternal album)
- Always & Forever (Randy Travis album)
- Always and Forever (Silk album), or the title song (see below)
- Always and Forever (Alien Ant Farm album)
- Always & Forever: The Classics an album by Luther Vandross, or the title song (see below)
- Always and Forever, an album by Planetshakers, or the title song
- Always and Forever Volume 1, and Always and Forever Volume 2, by Funker Vogt
- Always and Forever, by Mr. Capone-E

=== Songs ===
- "Always and Forever" (Heatwave song), also covered by Luther Vandross, Silk and other artists
- "Always and Forever" (Kostas Martakis song)
- "Always and Forever", a song by JJ72 from I to Sky
- "Always and Forever (BFF)", a song by Raze from That's the Way
- "Always And Forever", a song by Röyksopp

== See also ==
- Always and Forever, Lara Jean, a 2017 novel
- "Always Forever", a song by Bryson Tiller
- Forever and Always (disambiguation)
