= Elwy =

Elwy may refer to:

- the River Elwy, in Wales
- Elwy Yost, Canadian film historian and television host
- Laila Elwi, Egyptian actress sometimes credited as "Laila Elwy"

== See also ==
- Elway (disambiguation)
