= In My Mind =

In My Mind may refer to:

== Films ==
- In My Mind (film), a 2017 British documentary by Chris Rodley

== Music ==
=== Albums ===
- In My Mind (BJ the Chicago Kid album), 2016
- In My Mind (Heather Headley album), 2006
- In My Mind (Pharrell Williams album), 2006
- In My Mind 1997–2007 the Best of Bertine Zetlitz, 2007
- In My Mind (Is a Different World – A Cheeky One), a 2007 album by The Cheeky Girls

=== Songs ===
- "In My Mind" (Antiloop song), 1997
- "In My Mind" (Heather Headley song), 2005
- "In My Mind" (Maty Noyes song), 2016
- "In My Mind" (Ivan Gough and Feenixpawl song), covered by Axwell, and by Dynoro and Gigi D'Agostino
- "In My Mind", a song by Amanda Palmer from the 2011 album Amanda Palmer Goes Down Under
- "In My Mind", a song by Walk the Moon from the 2017 album What If Nothing
- "In My Mind", a song by Illenium, Excision, and Haliene from the album Fallen Embers

== See also ==
- My Mind (disambiguation)
- On My Mind (disambiguation)
