= At Hope's Ravine =

Studio album by Holy Esque
- Released: 26 February 2016
- Genres: Indie rock; Goth rock; Stadium rock
- Length: 45:22
- Label: Beyond The Frequency

Holy Esque chronology
Submission (2015)	At Hope's Ravine (2016)	Television / Sweet (2018)

Singles from At Hope's Ravine
- 1. "Hexx" Released: 2015; 2. "Silences" Released: 2015; 3. "Tear" Released: 12 January 2016

At Hope's Ravine is the debut album by the Scottish rock band Holy Esque. Released on 26 February 2016 through the band's self-created label Beyond The Frequency, the album was received positively by critics, although some reviews were more mixed; Pat Hynes' vocals were particularly discussed. The sound of the album has been compared to U2, The Jesus and Mary Chain, and JJ72. It was preceded by the singles "Hexx", "Silences", and "Tear".

== Background and release ==
Holy Esque began in 2011, after vocalist Pat Hynes met Keir Reid in East Kilbride the previous year. After releasing "Tear" – a track that would later be a single for At Hope's Ravine – in 2012, they released their debut self-titled EP in 2013, and the EP Submission in 2015.

At Hope's Ravine was released on 26 February 2016. It was preceded by the singles "Hexx", "Silences", and "Tear"; "Hexx" and "Silences" were released in late 2015, while "Tear" was released on 12 January 2016. The album was released on the record label Beyond The Frequency, which Holy Esque created.

== Musical style ==
At Hope's Ravine is an indie rock album, with influences from goth rock, stadium rock, and post-punk. Reviewers said that its musical style reflects the brutalist architecture of Lanarkshire and Glasgow. The album's overall sound has been compared to JJ72, The Jesus and Mary Chain, Nirvana's "Come As You Are", and U2's work from the early 1980s.

== Reception ==
Professional ratings
Aggregate scores
Source	Rating
AnyDecentMusic?	7.2/10
Review scores
Source	Rating
Clash	8/10
God Is In The TV	8/10
PopMatters	6/10
Q	3/5 stars
The Line of Best Fit	8/10
The Skinny	4/5 stars
Uncut	7/10

At Hope's Ravine was generally received positively by critics, although some reviews were more mixed. In his review for The Line of Best Fit, Ian Paterson described the track "Tear" as "the kind of shout-a-long moment groups of horrifically drunk friends share sentimentally at the end of a great night out", and concluded that "the heavens are the limit" for the band. Writing for Clash, Dave Beech described At Hope's Ravine as a "staggering, cathartic album"; in his review for DIY, he praised its juxtaposition of light and darkness and its "blistering intensity". Duncan Harman of The Skinny also praised the differences between light and dark aspects of the album, and compared Holy Esque to The Twilight Sad, Echo & the Bunnymen, and Simple Minds. Both Harman and Phil Mongredien of Q described the album as "muscular", although Mongredien was more critical; he stated that the first five tracks opened the album "in spectacular fashion", but that as a full album it was flawed and inconsistent. Evan Sawdey of PopMatters praised tracks such as "Rose" and "Hexx" for their merging of dark subject matter and catchy hooks, but criticised tracks like "Tear" and "My Wilderness" for being unimaginative and "like something Robert Smith scrawled on a napkin before throwing it away". Jason Anderson, writing for Uncut, also criticised some songs for being "too close to conventional power-balladry or Joy Division karaoke", but was happy that the band followed the adage of "go big or go home".

Many critics discussed the vocals on At Hope's Ravine. Dean Mason of God Is In The TV described them as "trembling [and] caterwauling", writing that "vocalist Pat Hynes has a unique style which makes him sound like he's being unbearably tortured whilst holding a pneumatic drill"; he concluded that the overall effect was "beautifully unsettling". Writing for PopMatters, Evan Sawdey recognised that Hynes' vocals could repel possible fans, but praised the distinctiveness the vocals gave At Hope's Ravine. Phil Mongredien of Q praised Hynes' "despairing roar" in the first five tracks, but believed that the vocals became more one-dimensional and overwrought towards the end of the album.

== Track listing ==
At Hope's Ravine track listing
No.	Title	Length
1.	"Prism"	3:09
2.	"Rose"	4:27
3.	"Hexx"	3:54
4.	"Covenant - (Ill)"	4:37
5.	"Silences"	3:42
6.	"Strange"	3:01
7.	"Doll House"	5:33
8.	"Tear"	3:16
9.	"My Wilderness"	4:47
10.	"St."	3:35
11.	"At Hope's Ravine"	5:21
Total length:		45:22
