= Andrew Jenkins =

Andrew Jenkins may refer to:

- Andrew Jenkins (songwriter) (1885–1957), American country, folk, and gospel composer
- Andrew Jenkins (actor) (born 1988), Canadian actor
- Andrew Jenkins (politician) (born 1941), American politician from New York
- Andrew Jenkins (music executive), British music-publishing executive
- Andy Jenkins (born 1971), English darts player
