= Mark Greaney =

Irish musician (born 1980)

- Born: 23 June 1980 (age 46)
- Origin: Republic of Ireland
- Genres: Alternative rock
- Instruments: Vocals, guitar, piano
- Years active: 1996–present
- Label: Lakota Records

Mark Greaney (born 23 June 1980) is an Irish musician. He is best known as the singer and guitarist in the alternative rock band JJ72, which he fronted from 1996 until 2006. He was later the frontman of Concerto for Constantine. Greaney is the former head of education at the British and Irish Modern Music Institute.

== Playing career ==
=== Beginnings and influences ===
Greaney played violin as a child and into his teens. After a brief period as a footballer with Everton's Dublin-based youth academy in his mid-teens, he began playing guitar and writing songs. He counts music artists Joy Division, Nirvana, Smashing Pumpkins, Igor Stravinsky, Depeche Mode, Nick Drake, Thom Yorke, Niccolo Paganini and authors Wallace Stevens and James Joyce amongst his influences.

=== JJ72 ===
==== JJ72 ====
Greaney met drummer Fergal Matthews while studying at Belvedere College in Dublin, Ireland, forming a friendship due to their mutual love of Joy Division, Nirvana and Smashing Pumpkins. With Greaney assuming vocal and guitar duties, the duo formed JJ72 with bassist Garvan Smith. After Smith's departure, fellow student Hilary Woods, who had previously shared the stage with Greaney as part of a string quartet, was added as the band's bassist. Greaney was serious about the band and received support from his mother. Woods later described that the band's songwriting process stemmed from Greaney "coming in with the melody and lyrics and basically the three of us then evolve it into a JJ72 song". After saving their money, the band recorded demos and posted them to the offices of Select, Melody Maker, NME and BBC Radio 1 in the UK, which won them attention. They ignored the Irish music press, with Greaney later stating "we thought there were a lot more people in Britain, so let's try there". The band quickly began playing live (while studying for their Leaving Certs) and self-released their first single, "Pillows (Oxygen)" in 1999. JJ72 signed with Lakota Records (a subsidiary of Sony) in the summer of 1999 and released their first single on the label, "October Swimmer", in November. The re-released "Oxygen" single (released in August 2000) gave the band its first Top 40 hit in the UK. The band's self-titled debut album followed "Oxygen" on 23 August 2000 and charted at no. 7 in Ireland and no. 16 in the UK, going on to sell in excess of 500,000 copies. The band performed their own headline tours and supported U2, Coldplay, Muse, My Vitriol, Embrace, Manic Street Preachers and The Dandy Warhols, wrapping their touring campaign supporting JJ72 in February 2002.

The band's sudden success came as a shock to Greaney. Looking back in 2010 on the whirlwind time around the release of JJ72, he said:

I think it's more with hindsight, as with most things, that you realise what a big deal it was. Because I think, like most people, when you're that age, when you're young, kind of late-teens, you want to take on the world, and you expect the world to listen to you a lot. I suppose it's a real exuberance, when you're in your teens you can have that kind of naivety. And that's why, at the time it was just like, this is meant to happen, you know?

==== I to Sky ====
The band began playing new Greaney compositions "Formulae", "City" and "Brother Sleep" live during 2001 and recorded their second album with former Smashing Pumpkins producers Flood and Alan Moulder in early 2002. Greaney used his Jesuit schooling as inspiration for the religious imagery present in the album's lyrics and was determined to make an album which wasn't "hit after hit". The album title I to Sky came about because Greaney wanted to capture the place which he wanted people to be transported to while listening to the album. In addition to singing and guitar, Greaney performed piano on the album's opening track "Nameless". I to Sky was released on 11 October 2002 to critical acclaim, but with lower sales than JJ72. The band embarked on a UK and European tour, which Greaney later admitted they shouldn't have undertaken, later saying "it was a horrible time because at the start of that tour, when we released the album, someone really close to me died as well". Bassist Hilary Woods departed the band in March 2003, which brought an end to the I to Sky era.

==== Unreleased third album ====
Greaney creatively "almost hit a wall" and "just stopped writing" in the period after the release of I to Sky, at a time when he thought the band should have been moving forward creatively. Canadian bassist Sarah Fox (from Dublin band The Valves) joined JJ72 in May 2003. Despite Greaney's songwriting problems, the band began playing new songs live throughout 2003, including "Coming Home", "Everything", "Nothing in This World", "Maria", and "Rainfalls". The band pressed on with writing and recording their third album throughout 2003 and 2004, before sending the album off for mastering in the spring of 2005. The album was recorded during a period of uncertainty for the band, as the man at Sony who had championed them in their early days moved to a different job and Lakota Records' funding from Sony was cut after the corporation merged with BMG. JJ72 headed out on a UK and Ireland tour in May 2005 (their first in two and a half years) and the limited edition "She's Gone" single followed in June. The band toured the UK and Ireland again in July and played the Download, Wireless and Electric Picnic festivals in the UK and Ireland over the summer. The band released the "Coming Home" single in late August (which stumbled to no. 52 in the UK charts) and went on what would be their final UK tour in September 2005, with Greaney often venting his frustrations from the stage. JJ72 played their final gig on 8 December 2005 at the Shepherd's Bush Empire in London, as support to Mercury Rev. After continuing frustrations with Lakota Records, JJ72 split in June 2006. The third album went unreleased, but many of the songs were released on the internet, some by Greaney himself. Greaney later said "It's a good record, a pop kind of record, but I don't think it had the emotional punch of some of the songs on the first or second record. I don't think it was any bad thing that it was never released".

=== Solo career (2007–present) ===
Greaney played his first solo gigs during his time in JJ72 when logistical problems and injuries prevented the trio from performing as a full band. He performed solo acoustic at the first date of the 2001 NME Awards Tour at Glasgow QMU, due to Fergal Matthews suffering an injury after the previous night's gig at Derby University. He appeared at a Jeff Buckley tribute gig at the Garage in London on 17 December 2003. Greaney embarked on his first solo tour in May 2007 (supporting Simple Kid in the UK) and uploaded two new songs to his MySpace page, "Falling" and "Lost and Found". He also spent time recording in New York City. Greaney made a live appearance in 2009, playing alongside My Vitriol, Frank Turner and Get Cape. Wear Cape. Fly at the Demolition Ball at the Astoria in London on 14 January, the final gig to take place at the venue. Greaney spent time recording at the Manic Street Preachers' Faster Studios in Cardiff with producer Dave Eringa in 2010 and the sessions yielded a new song, "Animal". Greaney reemerged towards the end of 2010, playing sporadic acoustic gigs around Dublin. He uploaded new songs "Drums and Violins", "Own Worst Enemy" and "History as a Cannibal" to his website. Greaney played his first solo headlining gig in the UK at Mr Kyps in Poole on 13 April 2011. He continued to play occasional acoustic gigs throughout 2011. Regarding his lack of output, Greaney said he has "so many songs that I'm happy to write or record and not give them to anyone".

=== Concerto for Constantine (2007–2009) ===
Greaney and bassist Gavin Fox (ex-Idlewild, Turn and Vega4) had been friends for years and always talked about forming a band when their schedules allowed. In 2007, Fox left Vega4 and suggested to Greaney that they form a rock band. Rounding out the band with drummer Paul "Binzer" Brennan (Mundy, The Frames, Bell X1), the trio began writing material. The band's first live performances were as part of the RTÉ 2fm 2moro 2our across Ireland in November 2007, with the band later admitting that they still hadn't named themselves when the offer came through for the tour. The band's first recordings surfaced on their Myspace page in 2008, demos of "Minsk", "Gaps", "Killing Fields", "Wasps", and "Cat's Cradle". Greaney achieved a childhood dream when Concerto for Constantine were picked to support the Smashing Pumpkins on the Dublin and Belfast dates of their Zeitgeist tour in February 2008. The band also supported The Futureheads in Sligo and gigged in Dublin throughout the year. New songs emerged at the gigs, including "The Last Swim", "Knife", "Silver", former JJ72 song "Everything", and Greaney's solo song "Falling". The band played two high-profile support slots to Snow Patrol in Dublin and London in early 2009 and an untitled EP was released on the band's MySpace page towards the end of the year, featuring "Minsk", "Cat's Cradle", "Killing Fields", "Gaps", and new songs "Vox Humana" and "Last Swim". The band has been inactive since 2009.

=== Other projects ===
Greaney formed a new band towards the end of 2012 and described its influences as Manic Street Preachers, The Raconteurs and Smashing Pumpkins. Nothing has been heard of the project since November 2012. Greaney teamed up with Dublin band Cronin to record and release a cover of Gene Pitney's Something's Gotten Hold of My Heart in December 2013. Greaney surfaced with a new band in February 2015, Kollaps1, which made its live debut at the Mercantile in Dublin on 4 February.

== Personal life ==
Greaney grew up in Dublin, Ireland to a businessman father and an artist mother. Greaney received a Jesuit schooling at Belvedere College in Dublin, which later influenced his lyric-writing. He is the former Head of Education at the British and Irish Modern Music Institute.

== Discography ==
=== Albums ===
with JJ72

- JJ72 (2000)
- I to Sky (2002)

=== EPs ===
with Concerto for Constantine

- Minsk (2009)

=== Collaborations ===
- Cronin & Mark Greaney – Something's Gotten Hold of My Heart (single, 2013)
