= Morbid Latenight Show =

Studio album by Bertine Zetlitz
- Released: March 2, 1998
- Genre: Electronica, synthpop, acid jazz
- Length: 39:10
- Label: EMI
- Producer: Jan Bang

Bertine Zetlitz chronology
Morbid Latenight Show (1998)	Morbid Remix Show (1998)

Singles from Morbid Latenight Show
- 1. "Getting Out" Released: 1997; 2. "Snow on a Hot Day" Released: 1997; 3. "Apples and Diamonds" Released: 1997; 4. "Abigail" Released: 1998

Morbid Latenight Show is the first studio album by Norwegian singer-songwriter Bertine Zetlitz and was released on March 2, 1998. Japan was pre-release on January 28, 1998.

== Track listing ==
No.	Title	Length
1.	"Abigail"	3:46
2.	"Snow on a Hot Day"	4:06
3.	"Apples and Diamonds"	4:11
4.	"Getting Out"	4:15
5.	"Pop Goes the Weasel"	4:33
6.	"Little Rosie"	2:44
7.	"Butcher's Son"	3:18
8.	"Colour Me"	4:18
9.	"Morbid Latenight Show"	4:49
10.	"In My Mind"	3:10
11.	"Apples and Diamonds ( Tee Productions Remix ) [ Japan only bouns track ]"	4:43

== Chart positions ==
Chart (1998)	Peak position
Norwegian Albums Chart	27
