= My Mind =

My Mind may refer to:

- "My Mind", a 2007 song by Portugal. The Man from the album, Church Mouth
- "My Mind", a 2017 song by Yebba
- "My Mind", a 2021 song by Baker Boy featuring G Flip from the album, Gela

== See also ==
- In My Mind (disambiguation)
- On My Mind (disambiguation)
- "Piece of My Mind", a 2021 song by Broods
- "Where Is My Mind?", a 1988 song by Pixies
