= Acts of Light =

Studio album by Hilary Woods
- Released: 3 November 2023
- Genre: Avant-garde; drone
- Length: 31:13
- Label: Sacred Bones
- Producer: Hilary Woods

Hilary Woods chronology
Birthmarks (2020)	Acts of Light (2023)

Acts of Light is the fourth solo studio album by Irish singer Hilary Woods, released on 3 November 2023 through Sacred Bones Records. Woods worked on the album for two years, writing, producing and mixing it herself. It received positive reviews from critics.

== Background ==
Woods wrote, recorded, produced and mixed the album herself over a period of two years, which marks a shift from her previous work into drone-based compositions. It also contains field recordings made in Spain and Ireland, contributions from the Galway City Chamber Choir and Palestrina Choir, and strings by Norwegian musician Jo Berger Myhre.

== Critical reception ==
Professional ratings
Aggregate scores
Source	Rating
Metacritic	76/100
Review scores
Source	Rating
AllMusic	3.5/5 stars
Clash	8/10
The Line of Best Fit	8/10
Uncut	3.5/5 stars
The Wire	4/5 stars

Acts of Light received a score of 76 out of 100 on review aggregator Metacritic based on six critics' reviews, indicating "generally favorable" reception. Marcy Donelson of AllMusic called it "compellingly constructed minimalist music", "gloomy yet suspenseful" and "definitely music for dourer days, although there's also an alluring elegance in play that can make it feel more mysterious than dispiriting". The Wire felt that "listened in sequence, the nine cuts are like chapters of a hike through a black pine forest, where the air is sharp and time stands still. A sense of foreboding makes way for desolation, ultimately unearthing liminal pockets of awe".

Kate Crudgington of The Line of Best Fit described the tracks as "nine shadowy fugues that flicker and fascinate the senses, gripping listeners with her instinctive, ominous sounds" but concluded that it is still "a hopeful record, rooted in intense feeling, nostalgia and desire to connect the past with the present". Clash's Nick Roseblade found it to be "an album to play when the curtains are pulled, and the rain is lashing at the windows. It's an album to get lost in and to find the pockets of light that punctuate the sublime melodies and dank instrumentation. It feels like Hilary is just getting started and we're not out of the woods yet". Uncut stated that "it all seems to emerge from some vast, long-abandoned cistern, though the astonishing degree of detail contained in 'Awakening' and 'Vigil' rewards listeners willing to be fully immersed".

== Track listing ==
All tracks are written by Hilary Woods.

Acts of Light track listing
No.	Title	Length
1.	"Burial Rites"	2:47
2.	"Wife Mother Lover Crow"	3:25
3.	"Where the Bough Has Broken"	5:03
4.	"Acts of Light"	3:54
5.	"Ochre"	2:30
6.	"Awakening"	2:49
7.	"Blood Orange"	4:28
8.	"The Foot of Love"	2:51
9.	"Vigil"	3:26
Total length:		31:13
