= Electric Feet =

Studio album by Bertine Zetlitz
- Released: March 16, 2012
- Genre: Electronica, synthpop
- Length: 40:49
- Label: Capitol, Sony Music
- Producer: Fred Ball

Bertine Zetlitz chronology
In My Mind 1997–2007 the Best of Bertine Zetlitz (2007)	Electric Feet (2012)

Singles from Electric Feet
- 1. "Electric Feet (feat. Samsaya)" Released: February 3, 2012; 2. "Starlight" Released: November 2, 2012

Electric Feet is the sixth studio album by Norwegian singer-songwriter Bertine Zetlitz and was released on March 16, 2012. The first single, "Electric Feet" (feat. Svenska Beat), was released one month prior. "Starlight" was released as second single on November 2, 2012. Both singles were released digitally, but the Starlight EP is in contrast to the first single available outside Scandinavia. The album entered the Norwegian album charts on no. 6.

== Track listing ==
No.	Title	Writer(s)	Length
1.	"One in a Million"	Martin Sjolie, Bertine Zetlitz	4:10
2.	"Electric Feet (feat. Samsaya)"		3:52
3.	"Pop Pop Pop"	Wiik Larsen William, Zetlitz	3:20
4.	"Get Me Out of Bed"		4:20
5.	"Bittersweet Embrace"		3:27
6.	"Stuck in Reverse"		3:20
7.	"Starlight"		4:03
8.	"Pretend to Dance"		3:22
9.	"Wrap Me 'round Your Finger"		3:02
10.	"Wrong"		3:58
11.	"For All That Is Lost"		3:37

== Chart positions ==
Year	List	Peak
2012	Norwegian Albums Chart	6
