= Sweet Injections =

2003 studio album by Bertine Zetlitz

Studio album by Bertine Zetlitz
- Released: April 28, 2003
- Genre: Electronica, synthpop
- Length: 46:41
- Label: Capitol
- Producer: Howie B, Magnus Fiennes, Richard X, Yoad Nevo

Bertine Zetlitz chronology
Beautiful So Far (2000)	Sweet Injections (2003)	Rollerskating (2004)

Singles from Sweet Injections
- 1. "Girl Like You" Released: 2002; 2. "For Fun" Released: 2003; 3. "Twisted Little Star" Released: 2003

Sweet Injections is the third studio album by Norwegian singer-songwriter Bertine Zetlitz. The album was released on April 28, 2003, and produced by Howie B, Magnus Fiennes, Richard X and Yoad Nevo.

== Track listing ==
No.	Title	Length
1.	"For Fun"	3:24
2.	"Sickest Girl"	3:26
3.	"Twisted Little Star"	4:07
4.	"Blow Over"	4:00
5.	"Girl Like You"	5:13
6.	"Wild Kisses"	3:17
7.	"Piper Piper"	3:58
8.	"Chainsaw"	4:03
9.	"So Beautiful"	3:48
10.	"Death in Her Room"	3:48
11.	"Let Armies Loose"	4:32
12.	"Slowly"	3:05

== Album artwork ==
The album artwork was by Martin Kvamme and received the Mark of Good Design from the Norwegian Design Council in 2003, the first CD cover to win the award.

== Chart positions ==
Year	List	Peak	Ref.
2003	Norwegian Albums Chart	1	
