= They Don't Know (Disciples song) =

Single by Disciples
- Released: 20 February 2015
- Recorded: 2014
- Length: 2:41 (radio edit)
- Label: FFRR
- Songwriters: Nathan Duvall; Gavin Koolman; Luke McDermott

Disciples singles chronology
"Poison Arrow" (2014)	"They Don't Know" (2015)	"How Deep Is Your Love" (2015)

"They Don't Know" is a song by English production trio Disciples. The song was released in the United Kingdom as a digital download on 20 February 2015 through FFRR Records. The song peaked at number 24 on the UK Singles Chart.

== Music video ==
A music video to accompany the release of "They Don't Know" was first released onto YouTube on 16 January 2015 at a total length of five minutes and four seconds.

The video, set on the coast and surrounding countryside of Pembrokeshire, opens with two teenage boys, Dylan (Daf Thomas) and Jake (Ifan Price), out shooting rabbits at night. While walking, they arrive at a campsite to find a drug dealer, the Leader (Fred Schmidt), attempting to assault a girl, Cerys (Lily Newmark). While the Leader is distracted, Cerys grabs a holdall from the back of his car and hides it underneath. After briefly tormenting Dylan and Jake, the Leader leaves, while Cerys finds substances and cash in the holdall. After Dylan offers her his coat, Cerys bonds with the two boys as they sit and drink by a fire, the trio setting off hiking together at daybreak.

Some distance away, the Leader discovers his supply stolen, and furiously drives back with his accomplices (Maribe Lehmkühler and Luke Shepperd). As they return, the gang discover the campsite deserted, much to their frustration. However, the Leader catches a glimpse of the trio walking across the fields in the distance.

Arriving at a beach, the three teenagers all relax and play together by the sea, with Dylan and Cerys appearing to grow closer. After they leave, they are caught by the Leader walking through a field, and run as him and his men give chase. After the Leader tackles Cerys and attacks Jake, Dylan fires a warning shot above his head, allowing him and Jake to hold the Leader and his accomplices at gunpoint. Cerys, meanwhile, spikes her bottle of whisky with some of the stolen narcotics, before forcing it down the Leader's throat.

As his accomplices flee, the three teenagers hitch a ride on the back of a farmer (Nicholas McGaughey)'s tractor, while the Leader attempts to pursue them, but eventually collapses in a field and starts hallucinating. That evening, as the trio release the drugs into the wind, Dylan attempts to kiss Cerys but she runs away. Dylan follows after her, leaving Jake behind, and the two eventually come together in a romantic embrace on top of a cliff, before they both catch up with Jake and continue onwards.

The video ends as the farmer unknowingly drinks Cerys' spiked whisky, while the Leader wakes up in the field to find himself surrounded by horses.

== Track listing ==
Digital download
No.	Title	Length
1.	"They Don't Know" (radio edit)	2:41

== Charts ==
Chart (2015)	Peak position
Belgium (Ultratip Bubbling Under Flanders)	44
Scottish Singles Sales (Official Charts)	26
UK Singles (Official Charts)	24

== Certifications ==
Region	Certification	Certified units/sales
United Kingdom (BPI)	Silver	200,000^{‡}
^{‡} Sales+streaming figures based on certification alone.

== Release history ==
Region	Date	Format	Label
United Kingdom	20 February 2015	Digital download	FFRR
