= Rollerskating (album) =

Studio album by Bertine Zetlitz
- Released: November 1, 2004
- Genre: Electronica, synthpop
- Length: 39:37
- Label: EMI
- Producer: Fred Ball

Bertine Zetlitz chronology
Sweet Injections (2003)	Rollerskating (2004)	My Italian Greyhound (2006)

Singles from Rollerskating
- 1. "Fake Your Beauty" Released: 2004; 2. "Ah-Ah" Released: 2004

Rollerskating is the fourth studio album by Norwegian singer-songwriter Bertine Zetlitz. The album was released on November 1, 2004, and produced by Fred Ball.

== Track listing ==
No.	Title	Length
1.	"Ah-Ah"	2:44
2.	"Fake Your Beauty"	3:37
3.	"Want You"	3:23
4.	"If You Buy the Blue One"	3:58
5.	"Kiss Me Harder"	3:52
6.	"Candy"	3:22
7.	"Rollerskating"	2:47
8.	"Broken"	3:58
9.	"Wicked Wonderboys"	4:12
10.	"Back Where I Belong"	3:11
11.	"If You Were Mine"	4:33

== Chart positions ==
Year	List	Peak	Ref.
2004	Norwegian Albums Chart	2	
