= Disciples (production team) =

English music group

- Origin: South London, England
- Genres: House; deep house
- Years active: 2013–present
- Labels: Parlophone; FFRR
- Members: Nathan Vincent Duvall; Gavin Koolmon; Luke McDermott
- Website: disciplesldn.com

Disciples (stylised as DISCIPLΞS) are an English production trio made up of Nathan Vincent Duvall, Gavin Koolmon, and Luke McDermott based in South London.

== Career ==
=== 2013–14: Early career ===
Disciples released their debut EP Remedy in 2013 on New State Music. It was picked up by DJ Target who introduced it to the mainstream on his 100% HomeGrown show on BBC Radio 1Xtra, a BBC radio channel. They also released the track "Catwalk" picked by Pete Tong, a British DJ on BBC and record label owner FFRR Records. Disciples's first major hit was "They Don't Know", released once again on FFRR Records in February 2015. BBC Radio 1 picked it as its "Track of the Day" and Tong highlighted it in his BBC Radio 1 programme Essential Mix.

=== 2015–present ===
The trio gained international recognition through their collaboration with Scottish record producer Calvin Harris on "How Deep Is Your Love", which peaked at No. 2 on the UK Singles Chart and No. 27 on the US Billboard Hot 100. The group released their EP The Following through FFRR Records on 24 October 2015. "How Deep Is Your Love" was nominated for British Artist Video of the Year and British Single at the 2016 Brit Awards. Later in the year, on 12 August, the trio released 'Daylight' which became Annie Mac's Hottest Record In The World. The song was added to Pete Tong's Essential Tune playlist and Danny Howard's Dance Anthems.

On 17 February 2017, Disciples released "On My Mind" which peaked at No. 15 in the UK Singles chart. The track went gold and stayed in the charts for a total of 22 weeks. It also featured as Radio 1's Hottest Record In The World and Tune Of The Week. Later on that year, on 29 September, Disciples released the track "Jealousy" which gained radio success and became Radio 1's Tune Of The Week.

== Discography ==
=== Extended plays ===
List of extended plays
Title	Details
Remedy	Released: 13 October 2013; Label: New State Music; Format: Digital download
The Following	Released: 7 November 2015; Label: Parlophone, Warner Music Group; Format: Digital download

=== Singles ===
List of singles, with selected chart positions and certifications, showing year released and album name
Title	Year	Peak chart positions										Certifications	Album
Title	Year	UK	AUS	BEL (FL)	CAN	FRA	GER	NLD	SWE	SWI	US	Certifications	Album
"Catwalk"	2014	—	—	—	—	—	—	—	—	—	—		Non-album singles
"Poison Arrow"	2014	—	—	—	—	—	—	—	—	—	—		Non-album singles
"They Don't Know"	2015	24	—	94	—	—	—	—	—	—	—	BPI: Silver	Non-album singles
"How Deep Is Your Love" (with Calvin Harris)	2015	2	1	2	16	2	4	2	6	4	27	BPI: 4× Platinum; ARIA: 8× Platinum; BEA: Platinum; BVMI: Platinum; GLF: Platinum; IFPI SWI: 2× Platinum; MC: Platinum	96 Months
"Mastermind"	2015	—	—	—	—	—	—	—	—	—	—		The Following
"No Worries" (with David Guetta)	2016	—	90	—	—	—	—	—	—	—	—		Non-album singles
"Daylight"	2016	—	—	—	—	—	—	—	—	—	—	BPI: Silver	Non-album singles
"On My Mind"	2017	15	—	10	—	—	—	63	—	96	—	BPI: Platinum; BEA: Gold	Non-album singles
"Jealousy"	2017	—	—	87	—	—	—	—	—	—	—		Non-album singles
"48Hrs"	2018	—	—	71	—	—	—	—	—	—	—		Non-album singles
"Atheist"	2018	—	—	—	—	—	—	—	—	—	—		Non-album singles
"No Ties"	2019	—	—	—	—	—	—	—	—	—	—		Non-album singles
"All Mine" (with Eyelar)	2019	—	—	—	—	—	—	—	—	—	—		Non-album singles
"Only the Gods" (with Lee Foss featuring Anabel Englund)	2020	—	—	—	—	—	—	—	—	—	—		Non-album singles
"Better on My Own" (featuring Anabel Englund)	2020	—	—	—	—	—	—	—	—	—	—		Non-album singles
"I Got You"	2020	—	—	—	—	—	—	—	—	—	—		Non-album singles
"Solid Gold" (featuring Bshp)	2021	—	—	—	—	—	—	—	—	—	—		Non-album singles
"—" denotes a recording that did not chart or was not released in that territory.

=== Other appearances ===
List of non-single guest appearances, with other performing artists, showing year released and album name
Title	Year	Other artist(s)	Album
"Yellow"	2015	Robin Schulz	Sugar
"Promise Land"	2017	Pete Tong, Jules Buckley, Heritage Orchestra	Ibiza Classics

=== Remixes ===
- 2019: Ella Eyre — "Mama" (Disciples Remix)

== Songwriting and Production Credits ==
Title	Year	Artist	Album	Contributed Member(s)	Songwriter	Producer			
Title	Year	Artist	Album	Contributed Member(s)	Songwriter	Primary	Secondary	Additional	Vocal
"Materialize!"	2010	Infernal	Fall from Grace	Nathan Duvall	check				
"Let's Get Naughty"	2011	Jesse & the Toy Boys	This is How Rumours Start	Nathan Duvall, Gavin Koolman	check	check			
"Move"	2013	Little Mix	Salute	Nathan Duvall	check	check			
"Sweater & Jeans"	2015	SJ-D&E	The Beat Goes On EP	Nathan Duvall	check				
"Sing It Out Loud"	2015	OMI	Me 4 U	Nathan Duvall	check				
"A.D.I.D.A.S."	2015	Little Mix	Get Weird	Nathan Duvall	check	check			
"Crew" (with Ray BLK and Kojo Funds)	2018	Raye	Side Tape EP	Gavin Koolman		check			
"Anyone I Want to Be"	2018	Roksana Węgiel	Roksana Węgiel	Nathan Duvall	check				
"Forgive or Forget"	2019	Ina Wroldsen	TBA	Gavin Koolman	check	check			
