= How Deep Is Your Love (Calvin Harris and Disciples song) =

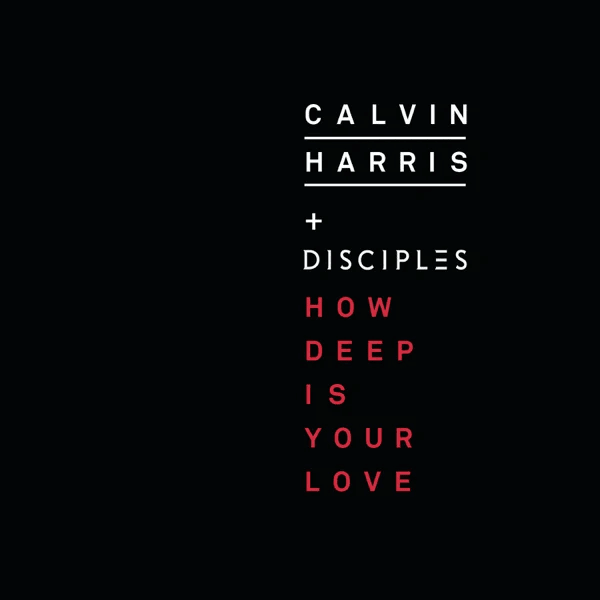

Single by Calvin Harris and Disciples
- Released: 17 July 2015
- Recorded: 2015
- Genre: Deep house
- Length: 3:32
- Label: Deconstruction; Fly Eye; Columbia
- Songwriters: Calvin Harris; Nathan Duvall; Gavin Koolmon; Luke McDermott; Ina Wroldsen
- Producers: Calvin Harris; Disciples

Calvin Harris singles chronology
"Pray to God" (2015)	"How Deep Is Your Love" (2015)	"This Is What You Came For" (2016)

Disciples singles chronology
"They Don't Know" (2015)	"How Deep Is Your Love" (2015)	"Mastermind" (2015)

Music video
- "How Deep Is Your Love" on YouTube

"How Deep Is Your Love" is a song by Scottish DJ and record producer Calvin Harris and English production trio Disciples. It was released on 17 July 2015 and included on Harris' first compilation album, 96 Months (2024). It features uncredited vocals by Norwegian singer and songwriter Ina Wroldsen. The single received generally positive reviews, and was commercially successful, reaching the top ten in 22 countries, including number two on the UK Singles Chart and number one in Australia, Belgium, Greece, and the Netherlands.

== Background and composition ==
On 3 June 2015, Harris announced an upcoming collaboration with London-based production trio Disciples. The song leaked on 15 July 2015, two days prior to its official release.

The song first materialised when London-based band Disciples and Norwegian singer-songwriter Ina Wroldsen co-wrote it in early 2014. They recorded the vocals of Wroldsen in one take for the demo. Two of the artists from Disciples who are published by Fly-Eye (Harris's publishing company) decided to send him the rough demonstration for feedback and pointers. Harris loved the track and eventually proposed collaborating on it together.

Harris told KISS-FM that following the release of Motion, he wanted to "do something else, something a bit different." He wanted a single out for the summer because it had been so long since it had happened:Up "I missed the feeling of having a new song out in the summer."

"How Deep Is Your Love" is a deep house song. It is written in the key of E minor with a tempo of 122 beats per minute, with Wroldsen's vocals ranging from B_{3} to C_{5}. Your EDM described it as an "upbeat tune", containing "bass-y plucks and piano chords". For Hayden Manders of Nylon, the track is influenced by 90s Euro house and compared it to Disclosure's music.

== Critical reception ==
Billboard called the song "another dance club anthem from the reliable hitmaker." Hayden Manders of Nylon felt Harris returned to form thanks to "How Deep Is Your Love". Writing for Jezebel, Jia Tolentino described it as "a straightforward, minimalist full-on heater with a contagious playfulness in its three main hooks" and credited Disciples for "the subtlety in this track". Daniel Cha from Your EDM opined that the song is "an ideal soundtrack to an oceanside drive".

Lewis Corner of Digital Spy wrote: "Calvin Harris is ready to soundtrack the rest of your summer with his new deep house banger." Time's Nolan Feeney wrote: "'How Deep Is Your Love' doesn’t evoke the pummeling build-ups and synthesizer onslaughts of Rihanna's 'We Found Love' or Cheryl Cole's 'Call My Name'. Instead, [Harris] opts for some slow-burning house. If his next album sounds this fresh, the love will go pretty deep, actually."

== Commercial performance ==
"How Deep Is Your Love" entered at number seven on the UK Singles Chart, giving Harris his 19th top-ten hit on the chart. The song eventually peaked at number two. The song debuted at number five on the US Hot Dance/Electronic Songs. It sold 41,000 downloads and captured two million U.S. streams (the bulk of which, 74 per cent, came from Spotify) in its first week. It marked Harris' eighth top ten since the chart's launch, making it the most of any act (previously, he was tied with Zedd at seven each).

Additionally, the song debuted at number four on Dance/Electronic Digital Songs and at number six on the Dance/Electronic Streaming Songs. On its tenth week, it has hit number three on both the Hot Dance/Electronic Songs and the Dance/Electronic Streaming Songs and reached number two on the Dance/Electronic Digital Songs and the Dance Club Songs. The song also debuted on Dance/Mix Show Airplay at number 24. It eventually reached number one on the chart after 10 weeks, giving Harris his ninth number one on this chart. Since the chart began in 2003, only Rihanna has racked up more number ones (11 hits). The single also debuted on the Billboard Hot 100 at number 60. and has since peaked at number 27.

In the Australian ARIA Singles Chart, the song debuted at number eight and in its sixth week on the chart, reached number one. It is Harris' first number-one single there.

== Music video ==
The accompanying music video for "How Deep Is Your Love", directed by Emil Nava, premiered on Tidal on 4 August 2015 and was released elsewhere on 6 August 2015. It features American model Gigi Hadid. Filming took place in Malibu, California in late June 2015. The video begins with Gigi laying on a table which she gets up on and walks down a hall into a party with bikinied women. Other scenes include Gigi flashing in different colours in a black background. Gigi then finds herself on a seaboat with water bikers. She then is transported to a pool where she dives into and walks out and takes off her clothes and hops in a shower and moves into another party room. Next, she is shown with motorcycles swarming around her. The video ends with Gigi walking out of the party room. It won Best Electronic Video at the 2016 MTV Video Music Awards.

== Covers ==
In September 2015, American singer-songwriter Charlie Puth covered the song on BBC Radio 1 and the version was included in the compilation BBC Radio 1's Live Lounge. Mitski covered the song in 2016 live at SXSW and has performed it live at various live sessions over the years. Slovenian duo Maraaya also covered the song, their cover can be found on their YouTube channel. Rihanna samples the song on her Anti World Tour while performing "We Found Love". Zara Larsson also covered the song in 2026, as part of her Spotify Live Room Set. Wretched Blessing and Genital Shame released a "gloomy, atmospheric version" of the song on Bandcamp in February 2026.

== Track listing ==
Digital download
No.	Title	Length
1.	"How Deep Is Your Love"	3:32

Digital download – Remixes EP
No.	Title	Length
1.	"How Deep Is Your Love" (Extended Mix)	5:56
2.	"How Deep Is Your Love" (Calvin Harris and R3hab Remix)	4:18
3.	"How Deep Is Your Love" (Chris Lake Remix)	5:08
4.	"How Deep Is Your Love" (Disciples and Unorthodox Remix)	6:04
5.	"How Deep Is Your Love" (DJ Snake Remix)	3:42

== Charts ==
=== Weekly charts ===
2015–2026 Weekly chart performance for "How Deep Is Your Love"
Chart (2015–2026)	Peak position
Australia (ARIA)	1
Austria (Ö3 Austria Top 40)	5
Belgium (Ultratop 50 Flanders)	2
Belgium Dance (Ultratop Flanders)	1
Belgium (Ultratop 50 Wallonia)	1
Belgium Dance (Ultratop Wallonia)	1
Canada Hot 100 (Billboard)	16
CIS Airplay (TopHit)	1
Czech Republic Airplay (ČNS IFPI)	4
Czech Republic Singles Digital (ČNS IFPI)	3
Denmark (Tracklisten)	5
Finland (Suomen virallinen lista)	4
France (SNEP)	2
France Airplay (SNEP)	1
Germany (GfK)	4
Greece Digital (Billboard)	1
Guatemala Airplay (Monitor Latino)	3
Hungary (Dance Top 40)	1
Hungary (Rádiós Top 40)	31
Hungary (Single Top 40)	3
Hungary (Stream Top 40)	3
Ireland (IRMA)	2
Israel International Airplay (Media Forest)	1
Italy (FIMI)	10
Lebanon (Lebanese Top 20)	1
Mexico Airplay (Billboard)	1
Mexico Airplay (Monitor Latino)	14
Netherlands (Dutch Top 40)	1
Netherlands (Single Top 100)	2
New Zealand (Recorded Music NZ)	2
Norway (VG-lista)	9
Poland Airplay (ZPAV)	4
Poland Dance (ZPAV)	5
Portugal (AFP)	11
Romania (Airplay 100)	1
Russia Airplay (TopHit)	1
Scottish Singles Sales (Official Charts)	2
Slovakia Airplay (ČNS IFPI)	8
Slovakia Singles Digital (ČNS IFPI)	4
Slovenia Airplay (SloTop50)	10
South Africa Airplay (EMA)	4
South Korea International (Gaon)	48
Spain (Promusicae)	10
Sweden (Sverigetopplistan)	6
Switzerland (Schweizer Hitparade)	4
Ukraine Airplay (TopHit)	1
UK Singles (Official Charts)	2
UK Dance (Official Charts)	1
US Billboard Hot 100	27
US Hot Dance/Electronic Songs (Billboard)	2
US Dance Club Songs (Billboard)	2
US Pop Airplay (Billboard)	16
US Rhythmic Airplay (Billboard)	30

2017 Weekly chart performance for "How Deep Is Your Love"
Chart (2017)	Peak position
CIS Airplay (TopHit)	81
Russia Airplay (TopHit)	92
Ukraine Airplay (TopHit)	4

2018 Weekly chart performance for "How Deep Is Your Love"
Chart (2018)	Peak position
CIS Airplay (TopHit)	101
Russia Airplay (TopHit)	178
Ukraine Airplay (TopHit)	58

2019 Weekly chart performance for "How Deep Is Your Love"
Chart (2019)	Peak position
CIS Airplay (TopHit)	166
Ukraine Airplay (TopHit)	67

2021 Weekly chart performance for "How Deep Is Your Love"
Chart (2021)	Peak position
CIS Airplay (TopHit)	192
Ukraine Airplay (TopHit)	191

2022 Weekly chart performance for "How Deep Is Your Love"
Chart (2022)	Peak position
CIS Airplay (TopHit)	179
Ukraine Airplay (TopHit)	134

2023 Weekly chart performance for "How Deep Is Your Love"
Chart (2023)	Peak position
Belarus Airplay (TopHit)	151
CIS Airplay (TopHit)	194
Lithuania Airplay (TopHit)	125
Romania Airplay (TopHit)	132
Ukraine Airplay (TopHit)	154

2024 Weekly chart performance for "How Deep Is Your Love"
Chart (2024)	Peak position
Belarus Airplay (TopHit)	173
CIS Airplay (TopHit)	187
Greece International (IFPI)	47
Lithuania Airplay (TopHit)	111
Moldova Airplay (TopHit)	74
Romania Airplay (TopHit)	124
Ukraine Airplay (TopHit)	104

=== Monthly charts ===
2015 Monthly chart performance for "How Deep Is Your Love"
Chart (2015)	Peak position
CIS Airplay (TopHit)	1
Russia Airplay (TopHit)	1
Ukraine Airplay (TopHit)	13

2016 Monthly chart performance for "How Deep Is Your Love"
Chart (2016)	Peak position
CIS Airplay (TopHit)	3
Russia Airplay (TopHit)	3
Ukraine Airplay (TopHit)	9

2017 Monthly chart performance for "How Deep Is Your Love"
Chart (2017)	Position
CIS Airplay (TopHit)	97
Ukraine Airplay (TopHit)	25

2018 Monthly chart performance for "How Deep Is Your Love"
Chart (2018)	Position
Ukraine Airplay (TopHit)	87

=== Year-end charts ===
2015 year-end chart performance for "How Deep Is Your Love"
Chart (2015)	Position
Australia (ARIA)	29
Austria (Ö3 Austria Top 40)	43
Belgium (Ultratop Flanders)	22
Belgium (Ultratop Wallonia)	36
Canada (Canadian Hot 100)	65
CIS Airplay (TopHit)	23
France (SNEP)	45
Germany (Official German Charts)	28
Hungary (Dance Top 40)	24
Hungary (Single Top 40)	27
Israel International Airplay (Media Forest)	9
Italy (FIMI)	46
Netherlands (Dutch Top 40)	11
Netherlands (Single Top 100)	23
New Zealand (Recorded Music NZ)	27
Poland (Polish Airplay Top 100)	24
Russia Airplay (TopHit)	23
Sweden (Sverigetopplistan)	54
Spain (PROMUSICAE)	40
Switzerland (Schweizer Hitparade)	23
Ukraine Airplay (TopHit)	48
UK Singles (OCC)	20
US Billboard Hot 100	100
US Hot Dance/Electronic Songs (Billboard)	9

2016 year-end chart performance for "How Deep Is Your Love"
Chart (2016)	Position
Argentina (Monitor Latino)	78
Canada (Canadian Hot 100)	100
CIS Airplay (TopHit)	19
France (SNEP)	131
Hungary (Dance Top 40)	10
Hungary (Single Top 40)	88
Italy (FIMI)	76
Russia Airplay (TopHit)	23
Spain (PROMUSICAE)	83
Switzerland (Schweizer Hitparade)	89
Ukraine Airplay (TopHit)	21
UK Singles (OCC)	82
US Hot Dance/Electronic Songs (Billboard)	17

2017 year-end chart performance for "How Deep Is Your Love"
Chart (2017)	Position
CIS Airplay (TopHit)	146
Hungary (Rádiós Top 40)	100
Ukraine Airplay (TopHit)	55

2018 year-end chart performance for "How Deep Is Your Love"
Chart (2018)	Position
Ukraine Airplay (TopHit)	178

2019 year-end chart performance for "How Deep Is Your Love"
Chart (2019)	Position
Ukraine Airplay (TopHit)	183

2024 year-end chart performance for "How Deep Is Your Love"
Chart (2024)	Position
Lithuania Airplay (TopHit)	148

2025 year-end chart performance for "How Deep Is Your Love"
Chart (2025)	Position
Lithuania Airplay (TopHit)	122

=== Decade-end charts ===
10s Decade-end chart performance for "How Deep Is Your Love"
Chart (2010–2019)	Position
CIS Airplay (TopHit)	11
Russia Airplay (TopHit)	22
Ukraine Airplay (TopHit)	30
UK Singles (OCC)	89
US Hot Dance/Electronic Songs (Billboard)	34

20s Decade-end chart performance for "How Deep Is Your Love"
Chart (2020–2025)	Position
Belarus Airplay (TopHit)	185

== Certifications ==
Certifications and sales for "How Deep Is Your Love"
Region	Certification	Certified units/sales
Australia (ARIA)	8× Platinum	560,000^{‡}
Austria (IFPI Austria)	Gold	15,000^{‡}
Belgium (BRMA)	Platinum	20,000^{‡}
Brazil (Pro-Música Brasil)	2× Diamond	500,000^{‡}
Canada (Music Canada)	Platinum	80,000^{*}
Denmark (IFPI Danmark)	2× Platinum	180,000^{‡}
Germany (BVMI)	3× Gold	600,000^{‡}
Italy (FIMI)	3× Platinum	150,000^{‡}
Mexico (AMPROFON)	Diamond+4× Platinum+Gold	570,000^{‡}
New Zealand (RMNZ)	5× Platinum	150,000^{‡}
Poland (ZPAV)	3× Diamond	300,000^{‡}
Portugal (AFP)	Platinum	20,000^{‡}
Spain (Promusicae)	2× Platinum	80,000^{‡}
Sweden (GLF)	Platinum	40,000^{‡}
Switzerland (IFPI Switzerland)	2× Platinum	60,000^{‡}
United Kingdom (BPI)	4× Platinum	2,400,000^{‡}
United States (RIAA)	4× Platinum	4,000,000^{‡}
Streaming
Greece (IFPI Greece)	2× Platinum	4,000,000^{†}
^{*} Sales figures based on certification alone.^{‡} Sales+streaming figures based on certification alone.^{†} Streaming-only figures based on certification alone.

== Release history ==
Release dates for "How Deep Is Your Love"
Country	Date	Format	Label
Italy	17 July 2015	Contemporary hit radio	Sony
Various	18 September 2015	Digital download	Deconstruction; Fly Eye; Columbia

== See also ==
- List of Airplay 100 number ones of the 2010s
