= You're Always on My Mind =

You're Always on My Mind may refer to:

- You're Always On My Mind (Barbara Jones album), a 1984 album by Jamaican singer Barbara Jones
- You're Always on My Mind (A Great Big Pile of Leaves album), a 2013 album by American band A Great Big Pile of Leaves
- "You're Always on My Mind", a 1972 song by American band Gallery
- "You're Always on My Mind", a song written by J. W. Alexander, published in 1961 on Sam Cooke's album My Kind of Blues
- "You're Always on My Mind", a song by SWV from It's About Time, 1992

== See also ==
- Always on My Mind (disambiguation) including for the song covered by Elvis, Willie Nelson, Pet Shop Boys et al.
