= Hilary Woods =

Irish musician

- Origin: Dublin, Ireland
- Genres: Alternative
- Occupation: Singer
- Instruments: Vocals, bass, piano
- Years active: 1996–present
- Label: Sacred Bones
- Formerly of: JJ72

Hilary Woods is an Irish musician born in Dublin. She is a solo artist, previously a member of the alternative rock band JJ72, with which she played bass guitar from 1996 until 2003. JJ72 had success with two Top 20 albums in the early 2000s with Woods as the bassist. She quit the music industry until 2013, returning with her first solo album, The River Cry, and the EP Night the following year.

Woods' solo albums have a gentle, ambient folk sound with "nocturnal keyboard-based songs". Her musical inspiration comes from filmmakers, electronic artists, experimental noise, and folk music traditions. She is currently signed to Sacred Bones Records and has released 5 albums and 3 EPs.

== Biography ==
Woods was raised in Dublin by parents that fostered a musical environment, playing classical, folk and rock LPs in the home. Her parents encouraged her to play music, and she began learning her main instrument, the piano. Her brother was encouraged to play instruments as well. As an 18-year-old, Woods joined the band JJ72 with singer/guitarist Mark Greaney and drummer Fergal Matthews. Woods played bass in the band from the late 90's to the early 2000's.

JJ72 was signed to Sony imprint Lakota Records and released their debut self-titled album in 2000, followed by their second album in 2002. Both albums were successful and reached Top 20 charts in the UK and Ireland. The group toured for a total of four years, after which Woods left the band and did not return to the music industry for more than a decade.

A year after leaving JJ72, Woods started a family and focused on raising her daughter.

Before returning to the music industry, Woods took college courses that sparked creativity and compelled her to continue making music. Notably, she was inspired by filmmakers such as Wong Kar-wai and Chris Marker. She also expanded her musical horizons by listening to electronic artists such as Jon Hopkins and Vincent Gallo.

After her spell in fine art school and having studied literature and film in college, she returned to music under the name The River Cry for one confidential self-titled album in 2013, then started to release EPs under her own name (Night in 2014 and Heartbox in 2016); leading to her debut solo record Colt in 2018 as a Sacred Bones artist. After releasing her debut solo EP Night, Woods began touring again. The album, Acts of Light, was released in 2023.

In 2025 Woods returned with the album Night CRIÚ.

== Discography ==
=== Albums ===
==== With JJ72 ====
- JJ72 (2000)
- I to Sky (2002)

==== Solo ====
- The River Cry (2013)
- Colt (2018)
- Birthmarks (2020)
- Acts of Light (2023)
- Night CRIÚ (2025)

=== EPs ===
- Night (2014)
- Heartbox (2016)
- Feral Hymns (2021)

=== Singles ===
- "N.I.B." (2021)
- "In Heaven" (2022)
