= Holy Esque =

Scottish rock band

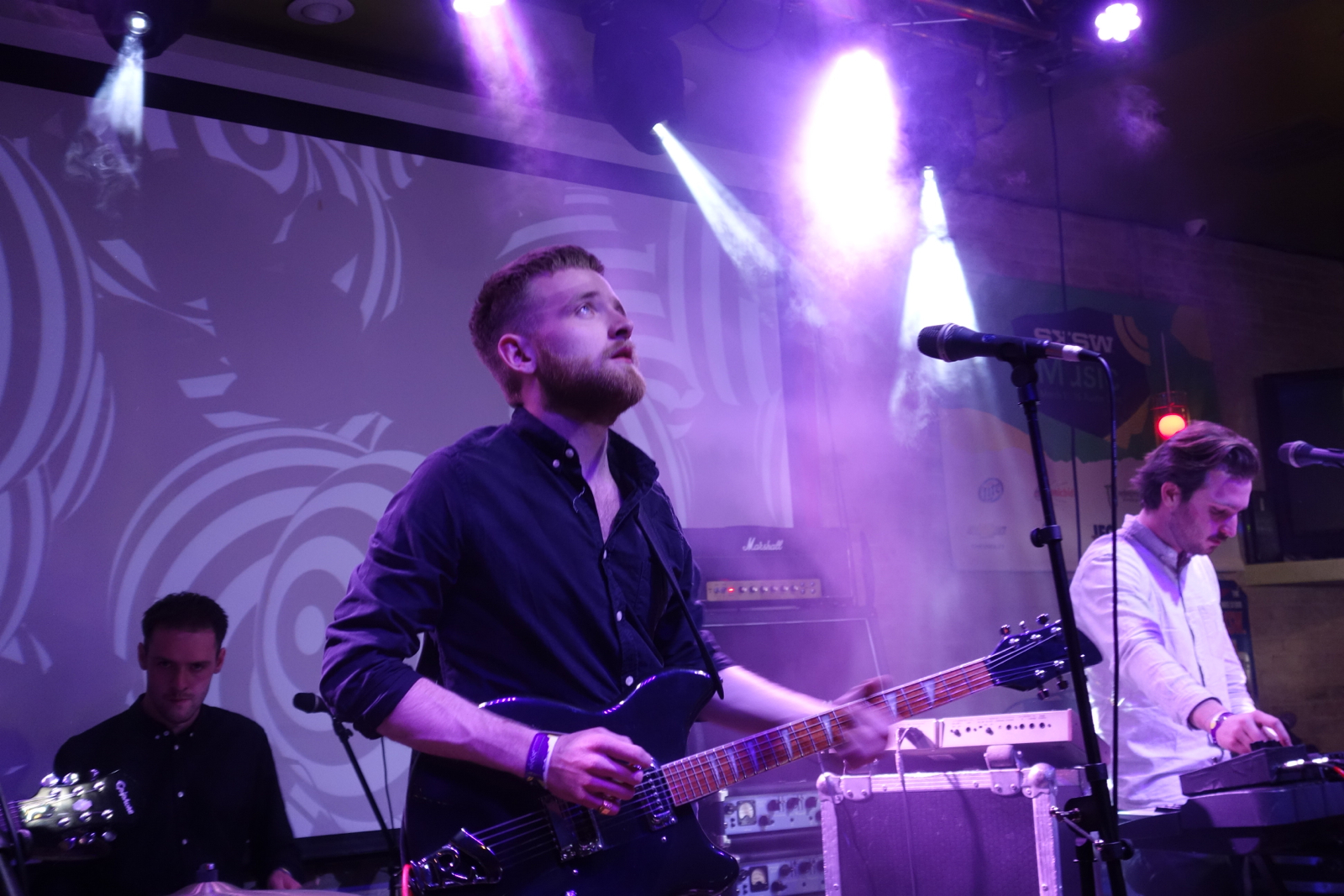
- Holy Esque in 2014

Background information
- Genres: Indie rock; Goth rock
- Years active: 2011–2024
- Website: www.facebook.com/HolyEsque/

Holy Esque were a rock band from Glasgow, Scotland. They released three albums from 2011 to 2024 - At Hope's Ravine, Television/Sweet, and Lay My Head Down Slow.

== History ==
Holy Esque began in 2011, after vocalist Pat Hynes met Keir Reid in East Kilbride the previous year. Their debut self-titled EP was released in 2013, followed by the EP Submission in 2015.

Holy Esque's debut album, At Hope's Ravine, was released on 26 February 2016. It was received positively, although some reviews were more mixed.

Television/Sweet, Holy Esque's second album, was released in June 2018.

In March 2024, Holy Esque released their final album, Lay My Head Down Slow.
