= Colt (Hilary Woods album) =

Studio album by Hilary Woods
- Released: 8 June 2018
- Length: 37:35
- Label: Sacred Bones
- Producer: James Kelly

Hilary Woods chronology
Night (2014)	Colt (2018)	Birthmarks (2020)

Colt is the debut studio album by Irish musician Hilary Woods. It was released on June 8, 2018, under Sacred Bones Records.

== Critical reception ==
Professional ratings
Aggregate scores
Source	Rating
Metacritic	71/100
Review scores
Source	Rating
AllMusic	3/5 stars
DIY	3/5 stars
The Line of Best Fit	8/10
Loud and Quiet	8/10
PopMatters	7/10

Colt was met with "generally favorable" reviews from critics. On Metacritic, which assigns a weighted average rating out of 100 to reviews from mainstream publications, this release received an average score of 71, based on 9 reviews. Music aggregator Album of the Year gave the release a score of 67 out of 100 based on a critical consensus of 7 reviews.

=== Listicles ===
Listicles for Colt
Publication	Accolade	Rank
Bandcamp	Bandcamp's 100 Best Albums of 2018	34
Fact	Fact's 50 Best Albums of 2018	26

== Track listing ==
All tracks are written by Hilary Woods.

Colt track listing
No.	Title	Length
1.	"Inhaler"	5:13
2.	"Prodigal Dog"	4:59
3.	"Take Him In"	4:11
4.	"Kith"	5:36
5.	"Jesus Said"	5:43
6.	"Sever"	2:52
7.	"Black Rainbow"	4:14
8.	"Limbs"	4:47
