= JJ72 (album) =

Studio album by JJ72
- Released: 28 August 2000
- Length: 48:51
- Label: Lakota Records
- Producer: Ian Caple

JJ72 chronology
JJ72 (2000)	I to Sky (2002)

Singles from JJ72
- 1. "October Swimmer" Released: 1 November 1999; 2. "Snow" Released: 21 February 2000; 3. "Long Way South" Released: 22 May 2000; 4. "Oxygen" Released: 14 August 2000; 5. "October Swimmer (re-issue)" Released: 23 October 2000; 6. "Snow (re-issue)" Released: 29 January 2001; 7. "Algeria" Released: 16 April 2001

Professional ratings
Review scores
Source	Rating
Allmusic	link
NME	3.5/5 stars

JJ72 is the self-titled debut album by Dublin indie rock trio JJ72. It was released on 28 August 2000.

== Track listing ==
1. "October Swimmer" – 3:21
2. "Undercover Angel" – 3:44
3. "Oxygen" – 3:42
4. "Willow" – 4:23
5. "Surrender" – 4:11
6. "Long Way South" – 2:51
7. "Snow" – 3:20
8. "Broken Down" – 5:09
9. "Improv" – 2:52
10. "Not Like You" – 3:36
11. "Algeria" – 3:21
12. "Bumble Bee" – 8:14

== Personnel ==
=== JJ72 ===
- Mark Greaney – vocals, guitar, songwriting
- Hilary Woods – bass, vocals
- Fergal Matthews – drums, percussion
