= My Italian Greyhound =

2006 studio album by Bertine Zetlitz

Studio album by Bertine Zetlitz
- Released: 18 September 2006
- Genre: Electronica, synthpop
- Length: 37:52
- Label: Capitol, EMI
- Producer: Fred Ball

Bertine Zetlitz chronology
Rollerskating (2004)	My Italian Greyhound (2006)	In My Mind 1997–2007 the Best of Bertine Zetlitz (2007)

Singles from Rollerskating
- 1. "500" Released: 2006; 2. "Midnight" Released: 2006

My Italian Greyhound is the fifth studio album by Norwegian singer-songwriter Bertine Zetlitz and was released on 18 September 2006.

== Track listing ==
No.	Title	Length
1.	"Draggin' Me Down"	3:10
2.	"500"	3:47
3.	"Obsession"	3:54
4.	"Get What You Deserve"	3:45
5.	"This Time"	4:48
6.	"Midnight"	4:11
7.	"This Moment"	3:34
8.	"Never Let You Go"	3:17
9.	"Sleep Through the Storm"	3:36
10.	"I'll Be Fine"	3:50

== Personnel ==
Album artwork by Martin Kvamme.

== Chart positions ==
Year	List	Peak	Ref.
2006	Norwegian Albums Chart	6	
