= Morbid Remix Show =

EP by Bertine Zetlitz
- Released: September 1998
- Genre: Electronica, synthpop
- Length: 30:09
- Label: EMI

Bertine Zetlitz chronology
Morbid Latenight Show (1998)	Morbid Remix Show (1998)	Beautiful So Far (2000)

Morbid Remix Show is an EP by Norwegian singer-songwriter Bertine Zetlitz. It was released in 1998 by EMI.

== Track listing ==
No.	Title	Length
1.	"Colour Me" (Tee Prod. Remix)	4:07
2.	"Apples and Diamonds" (Pierre J's Radio Mix)	3:14
3.	"Morbid Latenight Show" (Pierre J's Radio Mix)	3:58
4.	"Apples and Diamonds" (Tee Prod. Remix)	4:44
5.	"Snow on a Hot Day" (Erot Remix)	7:38
6.	"Getting Out" (Bjørn Torske Remix)	6:28
