= Bertine Zetlitz =

Norwegian pop singer (born 1975)

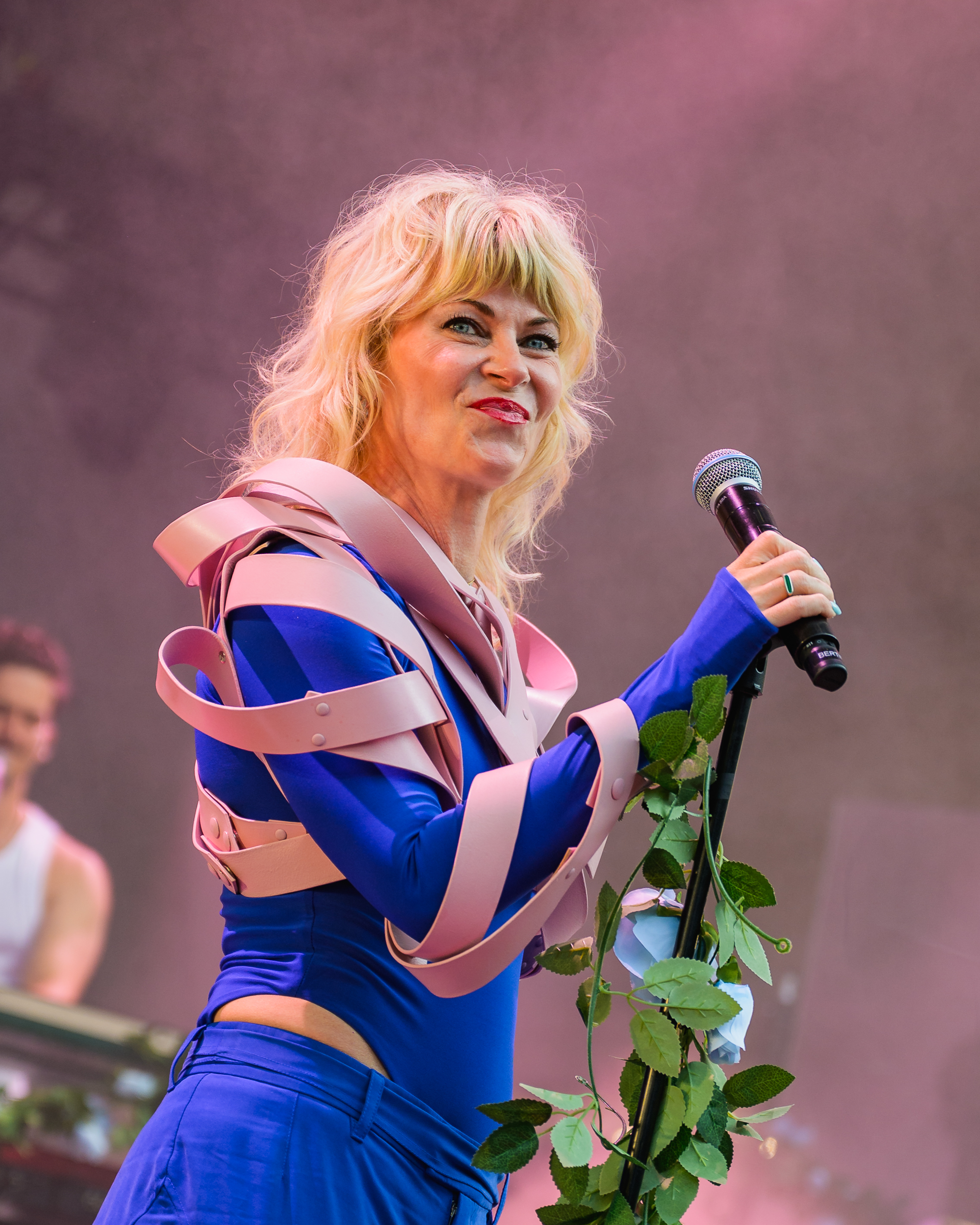
- Zetlitz performs in Kristiansand, Norway, in 2026.

Background information
- Born: Bertine Axeliane Robberstad Zetlitz; 9 April 1975 (age 51); Oslo, Norway
- Genres: Electropop, bubblegum pop, electronica
- Occupation: Musician
- Years active: 1998–present
- Label: EMI
- Website: bertine.com

Bertine Axeliane Robberstad Zetlitz (born 9 April 1975) is a Norwegian pop singer.

== Career ==
Bertine Zetlitz began her musical journey at a young age, penning her first numbers aged just 12. After gaining a background in classical music, Zetlitz began to experiment. Her debut album Morbid Latenight Show was released in 1998 and spawned several successful singles. In 1999 she toured in USA with Lilith Fair. It was followed by the Tore Johansson produced Beautiful So Far in 2000. Her third album, Sweet Injections, was released in 2003, helmed by electronic experts Howie B, Magnus Fiennes and Richard X (Sugababes, Rachel Stevens). Lead single "Girl Like You" signalled a change of direction for the singer.

Her fourth album Rollerskating was released in late 2006. EMI describes the release as a "fascinating and unique blend of pulsing electro, classic Disco nouveaux, twisted pop melodies and good old fashioned catchy choruses. It's Bertine as you know and love her, but with a new even more addictive sting in her tail." Lead single "Fake Your Beauty" was a radio hit and reached the top spot in the Norwegian charts. Its follow-up "Ah-Ah" was remixed on release and was a sizeable hit. Zetlitz released her fifth album My Italian Greyhound in September 2006. She described the album as "like its namesake: elegant, humorous, fit and well scented - with a charming hint of neurosis."

Zetlitz gave birth to her first child in 2007 and temporarily retired from show-business to become a full-time mother. Later that year she released the greatest hits album In My Mind 1997–2007 the Best of Bertine Zetlitz, which featured two new songs. She released her sixth studio album Electric Feet on 16 March 2012. She collaborated with Norwegian singer Samsaya on the title track.

== Personal life ==
Bertine Zetlitz is married with two children. She is a niece of Francis Sejersted and a descendant of Jens Zetlitz.

== Discography ==
=== Studio albums ===
Year	Album	Peak positions	Certification
Year	Album	NOR	Certification
1998	Morbid Latenight Show	27	
2000	Beautiful So Far	2	
2003	Sweet Injections	1	
2004	Rollerskating	2	
2006	My Italian Greyhound	6	
2012	Electric Feet	6	
2015	Tikamp	7	

=== Compilation albums ===
Year	Album	Peak positions	Certification
Year	Album	NOR	Certification
2007	In My Mind 1997–2007 the Best of Bertine Zetlitz	10	

=== Extended plays ===
Year	Album	Peak positions	Certification
Year	Album	NOR	Certification
1998	Morbid Remix Show	–	

=== Singles ===
Charting in VG-lista

Year	Single	Peak positions	Album
Year	Single	NOR	Album
2003	"Girl Like You"	2	
2003	"Fake Your Beauty"	1	
2005	"Ah-Ah"	13	
2006	"500"	11	
2007	"Ashamed"	4	

Other singles

- 1997: "Getting Out"
- 1997: "Snow on a Hot Day"
- 1997: "Apples and Diamonds"
- 1998: "Abigail"
- 1998: "Fi Fy Fo Fum" (with Marte Krogh)
- 2000: "Adore Me"
- 2000: "Cruel"
- 2001: "Fate"
- 2003: "For Fun"
- 2003: "Twisted Little Star"
- 2006: "Islands in the Stream" (with Thom Hell)
- 2006: "Midnight"
- 2007: "Bubble Bursts"
- 2012: "Electric Feet"
- 2012: "Starlight"
- 2015: "Sett at vi sier det sånn" (feat. Prepple Houmb)

== Awards ==
- Spellemannprisen (1998): 'Newcomer of the Year' and 'Pop Artist of the Year'
- Hitawards (1998): 'Female Artist of the Year'
- Hitawards (2000): 'Female Artist of the Year'
- Spellemannprisen (2000): 'Pop Artist of the Year'
- Spellemannprisen (2003): 'Female Pop Artist of the Year'

Awards
Preceded by Espen Lind	Recipient of the best Pop Solo Artist Spellemannprisen; 1998	Succeeded by Lene Marlin
Preceded by Locomotives	Recipient of the Newcomer of the year Spellemannprisen; 1998	Succeeded by Lene Marlin
Preceded by Lene Marlin	Recipient of the best Pop Solo Artist Spellemannprisen; 2000	Succeeded by Morten Abel
Preceded by No Female pop solo Artist award	Recipient of the best Female pop solo Artist Spellemannprisen; 2003	Succeeded by Sissy Wish
