= Beautiful So Far =

Studio album by Bertine Zetlitz
- Released: September 4, 2000
- Recorded: 44:04
- Genres: Electronica, synthpop, acid jazz
- Label: EMI
- Producer: Tore Johansson

Bertine Zetlitz chronology
Morbid Remix Show (1998)	Beautiful So Far (2000)	Sweet Injections (2003)

Singles from Beautiful So Far
- 1. "Adore Me" Released: 2000; 2. "Cruel" Released: 2000; 3. "Fate" Released: 2001

Beautiful So Far is the second studio album by Norwegian singer-songwriter Bertine Zetlitz and was released on September 4, 2000.

== Track listing ==
No.	Title	Length
1.	"Adore Me"	3:15
2.	"Certain"	4:05
3.	"Sick Communication"	2:54
4.	"Spitfire"	3:19
5.	"Tigerlilly"	3:21
6.	"Cruel"	4:37
7.	"Fate"	4:44
8.	"Everything I Want"	3:50
9.	"Uncomfortable"	3:17
10.	"Closer"	3:35
11.	"Lovers Do"	3:17
12.	"Beautiful So Far"	3:50

== Chart positions ==
Chart (2000)	Peak position
Norwegian Albums Chart	2
