= Elway =

Elway may refer to:

- John Elway, a former American football player
  - John Elway Stadium, a stadium in California named for Elway
  - John Elway's Quarterback, a football-themed video game named for Elway
- Jack Elway, a former American football player and coach, and father of John
- Jacob Elway, a character from Dexter
- Elway Research, a public-opinion firm.
- ELWAY (a backronym for "Elo with Lineup Weights and Adjusted Yardage", the statistical model used on Nate Silver's blog Silver Bulletin to rate and forecast the performance of National Football League teams

== See also ==
- Alway (disambiguation)
- Way (disambiguation)
- El (disambiguation)
