= Jackie Alway =

British music publishing executive

Jackie Alway OBE
- Born: February 1966 (age 60)
- Occupation: Music executive
- Years active: 1992–present

Jacqueline Alway OBE, professionally known as Jackie Alway, is a British-born music publishing executive. In 2019, she was appointed an OBE in the Queen’s Birthday Honours.

Alway is the executive vice-president international legal and industry affairs of Universal Music Publishing Group. She is the Chair of the ICMP representing the interest of the music publishing community internationally, former chair and a current board member of the UK Music Publishers Association, a member of the board of PRS for Music, the MCPS, Print Music Licensing Limited, the International Music Publishers Association, a board director of MCPS Ireland, and a member of the Council of the Music Publishers Association of Ireland.

== Education and career ==
Alway is an alumna of Christ's College Cambridge. She graduated in law from Cambridge University.

Alway began her career as a music lawyer in private practice at The Simkins Partnership. She joined Bertelsmann Music Group in 1992 working for the recording and publishing divisions, before joining BMG Music Publishing full-time. In 2007, Alway joined Universal Music Publishing Group when BMG was acquired. As executive vice-president international legal and industry affairs, her role includes multi-territory digital licensing, public policy and society relations.

Alway represented UK Music and the MPA at the UK Government's Creative Industries Sector Advisory Group for Trade and is a member of UK Music’s Legal and Rights Committee.

In 2021, Always was appointed the Chair of the International Confederation of Music Publishers. She is the first woman to hold the role of chair at the ICMP.

== Recognition ==
Alway was listed in the Billboard International Power Players lists in 2018 and 2019, along with the UMPG executives Andrew Jenkins, Alexandra Lioutikoff and Mike McCormack.

In 2019, in recognition of her contribution to the music industry and her efforts on behalf of creators and rights holders, Alway was appointed an Officer of the Most Excellent Order of the British Empire (OBE) in the Queen's Birthday Honours. Upon receiving the OBE, she was quoted as saying: "This is so unexpected and truly wonderful. To have one's peers secretly make the case for me to receive an honour is humbling and reflects the importance of the issues we are advocating for on behalf of creators and rights holders."

In December 2019, the UK Music Publishers Association awarded Alway its Gold Badge.

Alway was one of 24 women on the 2020 Music Week Women In Music Roll of Honour.
