= On My Mind (Disciples song) =

Single by Disciples
- Released: 17 February 2017
- Recorded: 2016
- Genre: House
- Length: 3:07
- Label: Parlophone; Warner
- Songwriters: Nathan Duvall; Gavin Koolmon; Luke McDermott; Kiris Houston
- Producers: Disciples; Kiris Houston (add.)

Disciples singles chronology
"Daylight" (2016)	"On My Mind" (2017)	"Jealousy" (2017)

Music video
- "On My Mind" on YouTube

"On My Mind" is a song performed by English production trio Disciples. The song was released in the United Kingdom as a digital download on 17 February 2017 through Parlophone and Warner Music Group. The song peaked at number 15 on the UK Singles Chart.

== Music video ==
A music video to accompany the release of "On My Mind" was first released onto YouTube on 3 April 2017 at a total length of three minutes and twenty seconds.

== Track listing ==
Digital download
No.	Title	Length
1.	"On My Mind"	3:07

== Charts ==
=== Weekly charts ===
Chart (2017)	Peak position
Belgium (Ultratop 50 Flanders)	10
Belgium Dance (Ultratop Flanders)	1
Belgium (Ultratip Bubbling Under Wallonia)	6
Czech Republic Airplay (ČNS IFPI)	34
Croatia International Airplay (Top lista)	38
Germany Urban (Deutsche Black Charts)	50
Ireland (IRMA)	19
Latvia (Latvijas Top 40)	16
Netherlands (Dutch Top 40)	28
Netherlands (Mega Top 50)	28
Netherlands (Single Top 100)	63
Poland Airplay (ZPAV)	2
Poland Dance (ZPAV)	13
Scottish Singles Sales (Official Charts)	7
Switzerland (Schweizer Hitparade)	96
UK Singles (Official Charts)	15

=== Year-end charts ===
Chart (2017)	Position
Belgium (Ultratop Flanders)	38
Latvia Airplay (LaIPA)	41
Poland (ZPAV)	20
UK Singles (Official Charts Company)	63

== Certifications ==
Region	Certification	Certified units/sales
Belgium (BRMA)	Gold	10,000^{‡}
Netherlands (NVPI)	Gold	20,000^{‡}
Poland (ZPAV)	Gold	25,000^{‡}
United Kingdom (BPI)	Platinum	600,000^{‡}
^{‡} Sales+streaming figures based on certification alone.

== Release history ==
Region	Date	Format	Label	Ref.
United Kingdom	17 February 2017	Digital download	Parlophone; Warner	
United Kingdom	26 May 2017	Contemporary hit radio	Parlophone; Warner	
