= Andrew Jenkins (music executive) =

British-born music publishing executive

- Occupations: President, Australia and Asia Pacific Region of Universal Music Publishing Group, music executive
- Years active: 1981–present

Andrew Jenkins is a British-born music publishing executive and the President, Australia and Asia Pacific Region of Universal Music Publishing Group. He is responsible for Universal Music Publishing activities in Australia, Asia, Africa, the Middle East, and global society and industry matters. Jenkins served as Chair of the International Confederation of Music Publishers and on the board of directors at AMPAL. He was elected to the board at APRA, Australia's music publishers association, in 2019. Jenkins is a board member of the ICMP representing interest of the music publishing community internationally.

Married to Australian Lynette Laming, former Miss Australia, high profile Property consultant and mother of 3 including Natasha Oakley, influencer and Co-founder of Monday Swimwear.

== Career ==
Andrew Jenkins began working for Polygram in the UK in 1981. He became general manager and senior director of Polydor Records until 1993. Jenkins worked with BMG-published artists Bee Gees and the Cure during that time.

=== BMG Music Publishing International ===
Jenkins joined BMG Music Publishing International in 1993 as vice president. He was promoted to president, BMG Music Publishing International in 2005. His signings included Alanis Morissette, Mosaic, Pete Townshend/The Who, The Cure, Robert Plant, Leiber & Stoller and Tom Waits.

=== Recognition ===
Andrew Jenkins was listed in the Billboard 2018 International Power Players, along with UMPG executives Alexandra Lioutikoff, Mike McCormack, and Jackie Alway. Jenkins was recognized for his work with the Chinese company Tencent and re-signed agreements with Tom Waits, Kathleen Brennan, and Bee Gees Robin and Maurice Gibb's estate.

In September 2019, Jenkins was awarded the AMPAL Award for Outstanding Contribution to Music Publishing.

=== Australia and Asia Pacific Region ===
Jenkins responsibilities cover Australasia, Asia, Africa, the Middle East, along with global performing rights organizations' matters. He has covered the Australian offices of BMG Music and subsequently Universal Music Publishing since 1993.

On the November 2, 2021 opening of Universal Music Publishing China's office in Shanghai, attended by Jing'an District Mayor Wang Hua and Shanghai officials, Jenkins was quoted as saying "I look forward to our staff working with the best Chinese talent to create songs that will resonate with people all around the world."

=== Views on copyright ===
Andrew Jenkins is a frequent speaker and attendee at international conferences including MIDEM, All That Matters, Contemporary Music Roundtable conference, and Music Australia. At the MIDEM conference in Cannes, France 2017, he expressed his views on copyright and was quoted saying "Copyright should be forever".

Jenkins proposed changes in Indian and Chinese copyright law to help songwriters exploit their performing rights. He believed that the two markets held huge potential and would be part of the leading markets in music.
