= In My Mind 1997–2007 the Best of Bertine Zetlitz =

Greatest hits album by Bertine Zetlitz
- Released: December 3, 2007
- Recorded: 1997–2007
- Genre: Electronica, synthpop, acid jazz
- Length: 128:03
- Label: Capitol, EMI

Bertine Zetlitz chronology
My Italian Greyhound (2006)	In My Mind 1997–2007 the Best of Bertine Zetlitz (2007)	Electric Feet (2012)

Singles from In My Mind 1997–2007 the Best of Bertine Zetlitz
- 1. "Ashamed" Released: 2007; 2. "Bubble Bursts" Released: 2007

In My Mind 1997–2007 the Best of Bertine Zetlitz is greatest hits compilation by Norwegian singer-songwriter Bertine Zetlitz and was released on December 3, 2007. It comprises one CD of singles and two new songs and a second CD of remixes.

== Track listing ==
CD 1

No.	Title	Length
1.	"Girl Like You"	5:13
2.	"Fate" (Disclab Remake - Radio Version)	4:14
3.	"Ah-Ah"	2:44
4.	"Apples and Diamonds" (1998 Digital Remaster)	4:11
5.	"Twisted Little Star"	4:07
6.	"Midnight"	4:11
7.	"Adore Me" (Radio Edit)	3:15
8.	"Fake Your Beauty"	3:34
9.	"Getting Out" (1998 Digital Remaster)	3:52
10.	"Cruel"	4:37
11.	"Abigail"	3:46
12.	"500"	3:47
13.	"For Fun"	3:24
14.	"Snow on a Hot Day"	4:06
15.	"Ashamed"	3:58
16.	"Bubble Bursts"	3:07

CD 2

No.	Title	Length
1.	"Fate" (Hell session)	5:35
2.	"Islands in the Stream" (with Thom Hell)	4:24
3.	"Snow on a Hot Day" (Erot Remix)	7:38
4.	"Getting Out" (Bjørn Torske remix)	6:28
5.	"Fake Your Beauty" (Pleasure Mix)	4:34
6.	"Apples and Diamonds" (Tee Prod. Remix (1998 Digital Remaster))	4:42
7.	"Ah-Ah" (Deeper Love Mix)	3:56
8.	"Get What You Deserve" (Bjørn Kaarud & John Moss Big Room Mix (2006 Digital Remaster))	7:39
9.	"Fake Your Beauty" (Gaute Drevdal Remix)	6:42
10.	"Fake Your Beauty" (Remix (with Ken Ring))	6:42
11.	"Girl Like You" (Lucky Music Remix By Richard X)	7:37

== Chart positions ==
Year	List	Peak	Ref.
2007	Norwegian Albums Chart	10	
