= Forever and Always =

Forever and Always may refer to:

== Books ==
- Forever and Always, a romantic novel by Jude Deveraux 2003
- Forever and Always, a novel by Cathy Kelly
- Forever and Always, a children's book by Debi Gliori and Alan Durant
- Forever and Always, a novel by Betty Neels

== Film and TV ==
- Forever and Always, a 1978 film directed by George Kuchar
- Forever and Always (Evig Og Altid), film at 2008 CON-CAN Movie Festival

== Music ==
=== Albums ===
- Forever and Always, a 1992 album by Patsy Cline
- Forever and Always, a 1994 album by Priscilla Herdman
- Always and Forever, a 1998 album by Parachute Band
- Forever and Always, a 2006 album by Silk
- Forever and Always, Diana, a 2013 album by The Tridels
- Forever and Always, a concert DVD by Luther Vandross

=== Songs ===
- "Forever & Always", a 2008 song by Taylor Swift
- "Forever and Always", by Poison Idea from the album Blank Blackout Vacant, 1992
- "Forever and Always", by Gabriel Yared from the soundtrack album for The Next Best Thing, 2000
- "Forever and Always", by Bullet for My Valentine from the album Scream Aim Fire, 2008
- "Forever and Always", by Parachute from the album The Way It Was, 2011
- "Forever and Always", by Peter Cincotti from the album Metropolis, 2012
- "Forever (and Always)", a 1952 song by Lefty Frizzell

== See also ==
- "Forever and for Always", a song by Shania Twain
- Always and Forever (disambiguation)
