= I to Sky =

I To Sky

Studio album by JJ72
- Released: 14 October 2002
- Length: 54:11
- Label: Lakota Records
- Producer: Flood, Mark Greaney

JJ72 chronology
JJ72 (2000)	I To Sky (2002)

Singles from JJ72
- 1. "Formulae" Released: 30 September 2002; 2. "Always and Forever" Released: 10 February 2003

Professional ratings
Review scores
Source	Rating
Allmusic	link

I to Sky is the second and final album from Irish indie rock band JJ72, released on Lakota Records in 2002, to much critical acclaim, but lesser commercial success.

== Track listing ==
1. "Nameless" – 2:26
2. "Formulae" – 4:13
3. "I Saw a Prayer" – 4:59
4. "Serpent Sky" – 3:18
5. "Always and Forever" – 4:30
6. "Brother Sleep" – 4:20
7. "Sinking" – 7:15
8. "7th Wave" – 4:00
9. "Half Three" – 4:27
10. "Glimmer" – 4:47
11. "City" – 5:17
12. "Oíche Mhaith" – 4:34

== Personnel ==
=== JJ72 ===
- Mark Greaney - vocals, guitar, piano, songwriting
- Hilary Woods - bass, vocals
- Fergal Matthews - drums, percussion
