= Always Was =

Always Was may refer to:

- Always Was (EP), a 2020 EP by Briggs
- "Always Was" (song), a 2001 song by Aaron Tippin
- "Always was, always will be", a slogan used by Indigenous Australians

== See also ==
- Always Was, Is and Always Shall Be, a 1980 album by GG Allin
- Is and Always Was, a 2009 album by Daniel Johnston
