= JJ72 =

Irish alternative rock band

- Origin: Dublin, Ireland
- Genres: Alternative rock, indie rock
- Years active: 1996–2006
- Label: Lakota Records/Columbia Records
- Past members: Mark Greaney; Fergal Matthews; Garvin Smith; Hilary Woods; Sarah Fox

JJ72 were an alternative rock band from Dublin, Ireland. After forming in 1996, they signed to Lakota Records in 1999 and released two albums before splitting in 2006.

== History ==
=== Formation and early years ===
The band was formed in 1996 by lead singer and songwriter Mark Greaney and drummer Fergal Matthews, while studying at Belvedere College. Greaney grew up in Dublin, where for a time he lived next door to Phil Lynott. Matthews originated from County Meath. The name 'JJ72' derives from a window at Belvedere College made from 72 jam jars. They cited Nirvana, Mudhoney and Joy Division as influences. After auditioning several bassists they recruited their schoolmate Garvin Smith on bass in 1996. After a few early gigs, Smith left, and Greaney and Matthews once again set about auditions for a new bassist. Two bassists had short stints with the band, but in 1997 Greaney and Matthews entered the studio as a duo to record their first demo. They sent it to local record companies and media but with little response. In 1998 they started university courses, but shortly after starting they decided to concentrate on the band; They played a concert at Behan's pub in Dublin, backed by a string quartet, and were asked to appear on local television. They then recruited Hilary Woods, who Greaney had known for several years. Despite having only picked up bass recently, Woods became a member in January 1999. They recorded a second demo and targeted the UK, playing several gigs there and getting a write-up in Select. This led to interest from the Dublin-based Sony sub-label Lakota Records, who signed the band in mid-1999.

=== Commercial success ===
Début single "October Swimmer" was released in November that year, and was named 'Single of the Week' by BBC Radio 1 DJ Mark Radcliffe. They were given support slots with The Dandy Warhols and My Vitriol. The band had their first hit with "Long Way South" in May 2000, which peaked at number 68 in the UK and they played at festivals including Glastonbury, Reading and Leeds later that year.

The band released their eponymously titled debut album in Summer 2000. Produced by Ian Caple, the album was a critical and commercial success and has sold in excess of 500,000 copies in the band's native Ireland and in the United Kingdom, where it reached number 16 on the UK Albums Chart. In Germany, a special 'tour edition' was released, including a second CD-ROM disc. The album spawned the singles "Snow", "October Swimmer", "Long Way South", and "Oxygen", and saw the band perform promotional tours in Europe and the US. "Oxygen" gave the band their first top 30 single in the UK, leading the band to perform on Top of the Pops. After touring with Coldplay and Embrace, they set out on their own headline tour in 2001. They supported Muse on a tour of Europe, headlined the NME Brats tour and played in Japan. Several performances had been cancelled after Greaney lost his voice and there were further cancellations in 2001 after Matthews was knocked off his motorbike, with Kylie Minogue's drummer Bob Knight standing in for a few gigs. Matthews recovered in time for the festival season and support slots with U2. The band received an Irish Music Award for 'Best New Band' later that year. The band continued touring into February 2002.

The band's second album I To Sky followed in October 2002. It contained the singles "Formulae" and "Always and Forever" and reached the Top 5 of the Irish album charts and the Top 20 of the UK Albums Chart. The album was backed by a UK and Europe headlining tour, either side of eight shows supporting Suede in November 2002.

=== Return and split ===
In February 2003, bassist Hilary Woods left the band. Greaney and Matthews recruited Canadian-born bassist Sarah Fox as her replacement. The band played sporadic shows through 2003 and began recording new material with producer Ken Thomas in August that year, for a release expected in January 2004. In December 2004, it was reported that recording for the band's third album had been completed at Parkgate Studios, Catsfield, with producer Ian Caple. A Spring 2005 release was tentatively announced. In May 2005, the band played its first shows since November 2003 and released the download and 7"-only single "She's Gone", which reached 136 in the UK Singles Chart. A second single, "Coming Home" followed in August 2005 and peaked at number 52 in the UK Singles Chart. A tour followed in September 2005, with Greaney expressing from the stage his frustrations regarding the release of the third album, pending an ongoing dispute with their record labels Lakota Records/Sony. An October 2005 release date for the album failed to materialise. Songs rumoured to have been included on the new album: "Take From Me", "Radio", "Everything", "Rainfalls", "Underground", "Maria", "Nothing In This World", "Some Day" (this song, as Demo version, appear as B-side on the "coming Home" 7" vinyl). A promotional CD containing "Coming Home", "Take From Me", "Radio" and "Everything" was circulated in 2005.

However, on 22 June 2006, JJ72 issued a press release announcing they were to split up after 10 years together. They cited a struggle with their record label as their main reason for the split. This press release began by borrowing John Donne's epitaph and read:

Reader, we are to let thee know,

JJ72's body only lies below;
For could the grave JJ's soul comprise,
Earth would be richer than the skies.

JJ72 was born during an Easter many seasons ago; today it dies on the cusp of midsummer eleven years later. Mark Greaney, Fergal Matthews & Sarah Fox wish to express their deepest and darkest gratitude to all of those with impeccable taste who helped and supported the band. We remember everything, from mechanical birds in Japan to angels in arid Arizona, from broken bones and Berlin birthdays to predatory Portsmouth spiders. For those who disliked and perhaps despised (gasp) JJ72, thank you – how did beautiful photographs exist without a negative?! We crafted two monuments of magnificence for the future aural pleasure and pain of all would be JJ believers and doubters....and for those who care not for the passing of the petulant yet powerful pup....shame on you! Thank you to Hilary Woods for being a dazzling damsel and thank you to all who played music in/with the band. You know who you are.

=== Post-JJ72 activities ===
Mark Greaney embarked upon his first tour as a solo artist in May 2007. He subsequently formed a new band called Concerto For Constantine, featuring himself (guitar and vocals), Gavin Fox (ex-Idlewild/Turn/Vega4 on bass) and Binzer (ex-BellX1/Frames/Halite on drums). The band performed live throughout Ireland as part of the "2fm 2moro 2our" in November 2007 and supported Smashing Pumpkins in Belfast and Dublin in Spring 2008. Concerto for Constantine then went on to sell out headline shows in Dublin and London, and also played at the Oxegen Festival in Ireland and at T in the Park in Scotland in July 2008. Post activity with Concerto for Constantine, Greaney returned to academia and is now head of education at the British and Irish Modern Music Institute (BIMM). New musical work includes the project, Vishion Factum, focusing on transhumanism and the aesthetics of succulent plants.

Sarah Fox played bass for a band called Lluther, but has since left the band and is now a London-based graphic designer. Fergal Matthews lives in Norway and plays drums for Blodhevn. Woods returned to visual arts and started a solo project called The River Cry, with a debut self-titled album released on 14 February 2013. She is now recording under her own name on the Sacred Bones label, and recorded two LPs in 2018 and 2020.

== Band members ==
- Mark Greaney (born 23 June 1980) – vocals, guitar, piano
- Fergal Matthews (born 29 January 1980, in Dublin) – drums
- Hilary Woods (born 30 May 1980) – bass, backing vocals
- Sarah Fox – bass (from 2003 onwards)
- Garvin Smith – bass (early line-up)

== Discography ==
=== Albums ===
Year	Details	Peak chart positions			Certifications (sales thresholds)
Year	Details	IRE	UK	FRA	Certifications (sales thresholds)
2000	JJ72: Released: 28 August 2000; Label: Lakota Records	7	16	—	UK: Gold
2002	I to Sky: Released: 11 October 2002; Label: Lakota Records	10	20	124	

=== Singles ===
Year	Title	Peak chart positions			Album
Year	Title	IRE	UK	NED	Album
1999	"Pillows" ("Oxygen") (demo)	—	—	—	
1999	"October Swimmer"	—	—	—	
2000	"Snow"	—	80	—	
2000	"Long Way South"	—	68	—	JJ72
2000	"Oxygen"	42	23	—	JJ72
2000	"October Swimmer"	50	29	86	JJ72
2001	"Snow"	33	21	—	JJ72
2001	"Algeria" (promo only)	—	—	—	JJ72
2002	"Formulae"	24	28	—	I to Sky
2003	"Always and Forever"	—	43	—	I to Sky
2005	"She's Gone"	—	136	—	
2005	"Coming Home"	38	52	—	
"—" denotes releases that did not chart.
