= Allway =

Allway may refer to:

- Allway (constituency), a constituency in Tsuen Wan District
- Allway Gardens, a private housing estate in Tsuen Wan, Hong Kong
- Allway Sync, a backup and file synchronization software
