= Always on My Mind (disambiguation) =

"Always on My Mind" is a 1971 song originally recorded by Brenda Lee, later covered by Elvis Presley, Willie Nelson, Pet Shop Boys and other artists.

Always on My Mind may also refer to:

== Music ==
- Always on My Mind (Willie Nelson album), a 1982 Willie Nelson album that contained, and was named after, the Brenda Lee song
- Always on My Mind (Houston Person album), a 1986 Houston Person that contained, and was named after, the Brenda Lee song
- "Always on My Mind" (Rani song), a 1997 single by Australian singer Rani
- "Always on My Mind" (Tiki Taane song), 2008
- "Always on My Mind" (Adelén song), 2014
- "Always on My Mind", a song by Loverboy from their 1980 album Loverboy
- "Always on My Mind", a song by Brandy from her 1994 album Brandy
- "Always on My Mind", a song by Phantom Planet from their 2002 album The Guest
- "Always on My Mind", a song by Before Dark, from the album Daydreamin'
- "Always on My Mind", a song by Bosson, from the album The Right Time
- "Always on My Mind", a song by Da'Ville
- "Always on My Mind", a song by Alsou
- "Always on My Mind", a song by World Party from their 2000 album Dumbing Up
- "Always on My Mind", a song by Emigrate from their 2021 album The Persistence of Memory

== Other ==
- Always on My Mind (film), a 1993 Michael Hui film
- "Always on My Mind" (Doc Martin), a 2005 television episode

== See also ==
- You're Always on My Mind (disambiguation)
